= James Fairbairn =

Australian politician

The Honourable James Fairbairn
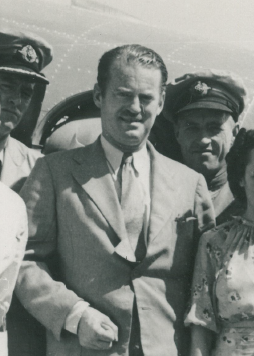

Minister for Air and Civil Aviation
- In office 26 April 1939 – 13 August 1940
- Prime Minister: Robert Menzies
- Preceded by: Harold Thorby (Civil Aviation)
- Succeeded by: Arthur Fadden

Member of the Australian Parliament for Flinders
- In office 11 November 1933 – 13 August 1940
- Preceded by: Stanley Bruce
- Succeeded by: Rupert Ryan

Member of the Victorian Parliament for Warrnambool
- In office May 1932 – October 1933
- Preceded by: Henry Bailey
- Succeeded by: Keith McGarvie

Personal details
- Born: 28 July 1897 Wadhurst, Sussex, England
- Died: 13 August 1940 (aged 43) Canberra, Australian Capital Territory, Australia
- Party: UAP
- Spouse: Daisy Olive Forrester (m. 1923)
- Relations: George Fairbairn (uncle); Steve Fairbairn (uncle)
- Occupation: Grazier

James Valentine Fairbairn (28 July 1897 – 13 August 1940) was an Australian aviator and politician. A World War I fighter pilot, he represented the United Australia Party (UAP) in federal parliament and served as Minister for Air and Civil Aviation from 1939 until his death the following year.

Fairbairn was born in England to Australian parents, and grew up in country Victoria. At the age of 18 he returned to England to enlist in the Royal Flying Corps (RFC). He was shot down behind enemy lines on one of his first missions and received a severe arm injury, subsequently spending over a year as a German prisoner-of-war. Fairbairn subsequently became a grazier in Victoria's Western District. He briefly served in the Victorian Legislative Assembly (1932–1933) before winning a by-election to the House of Representatives. Fairbairn continued flying as a civilian and was recognised as an aviation expert. He was appointed to cabinet in 1939 as a member of the first Menzies Government. He was killed in the 1940 Canberra air disaster along with two of his cabinet colleagues and the head of the army.

== Early life ==
Fairbairn was born on 28 July 1897 at Wadhurst, Sussex, England. He was the third of five children born to Australian parents Elizabeth (née Osborne) and Charles Fairbairn. His father's family had immense pastoral holdings in Queensland and Victoria, which had been accumulated by his Scottish-born grandfather George Fairbairn. His father and five uncles, including George and Steve, took over their management. His maternal grandfather James Osborne was also a pastoralist. When Fairbairn was two years old, his father acquired a property near Skipton in the Western District of Victoria. He was raised there until the age of eleven when he was sent to board at Geelong Grammar School. He represented the school in tennis, athletics and rowing.

== Military service ==
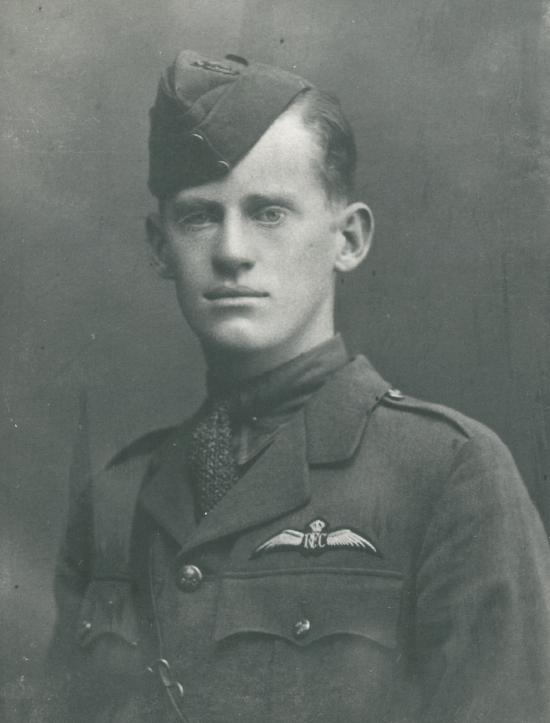
Fairbairn in the uniform of an RFC flying officer

In 1915, after his 18th birthday, Fairbairn sailed to England to enlist in the Royal Flying Corps (RFC), the air arm of the British Army. His older brother Osborne was already a member of the RFC, having been a student at Jesus College, Cambridge, when the war broke out. He was admitted to officer training and sent to Scotland for instruction in June 1916, flying out of Turnhouse and Stirling. He completed his training in Croydon and Netheravon, practising on Bristol Scouts. After being commissioned as a flying officer, Fairbairn left for France in late December 1916 as a fighter pilot with No. 54 Squadron, the first RFC unit to fly Sopwith Pups. The squadron began operations the following month.

On 14 February 1917, Fairbairn and nine others were assigned to escort a reconnaissance mission over the German lines between Cambrai and Saint-Quentin. He broke off from the formation due to an engine failure and was pursued by German planes, eventually being forced into a crash landing. He had attempted an Immelmann turn but was unable to regain lateral control, forcing the aircraft into a spiralling vertical descent. Upon landing, Fairbairn immediately set the plane on fire to avoid capture, but was unable to free himself and had to be rescued by German troops. He sustained severe facial burns from the fire, in addition to a bullet wound to the right elbow that was assessed as inoperable and left him permanently impaired. Taken as a prisoner-of-war, Fairbairn spent time in France and the Netherlands before being sent to Switzerland to convalesce. He was exchanged for a German prisoner in April 1918 and continued his recovery at a hospital in London. His injuries entitled him to a small Royal Air Force pension.

== Post-war life and early political involvement ==
Fairbairn returned to Australia in December 1919. He moved to Central Queensland to run his family's station at Peak Downs. He married Daisy Olive "Peggy" Forrest in Melbourne in 1923, and the following year they acquired a grazing property, Mount Elephant, in the Western District near Derrinallum. The couple had one son and one daughter together. Their property of 4,000 acres (1,600 ha) initially carried 3,000 sheep, but by 1934 had expanded to 10,000 sheep and 350 cattle, which Fairbairn attributed to the introduction of superphosphate. He was one of the first to cross Southdowns with Corriedales and represented the local district with the Graziers' Association of Victoria.

Through family and school connections, Fairbairn acquired seats on the boards of the Union Trustee Company of Australia and the Commercial Banking Company of Sydney. He stood unsuccessfully for the Hampden Shire Council in 1924, losing to his future cabinet colleague Geoffrey Street. He was successful in a second attempt in 1930, but served only a single term before retiring. Fairbairn retained a keen interest in aviation, building a private airstrip on his property. In April 1931 he purchased a secondhand de Havilland DH.60 Moth, which he crash-landed near Camperdown in March 1932 while returning from a council meeting.

In 1932 Fairbairn was elected to the Victorian Legislative Assembly as the member for Warrnambool, representing the United Australia Party.

== Federal politics ==
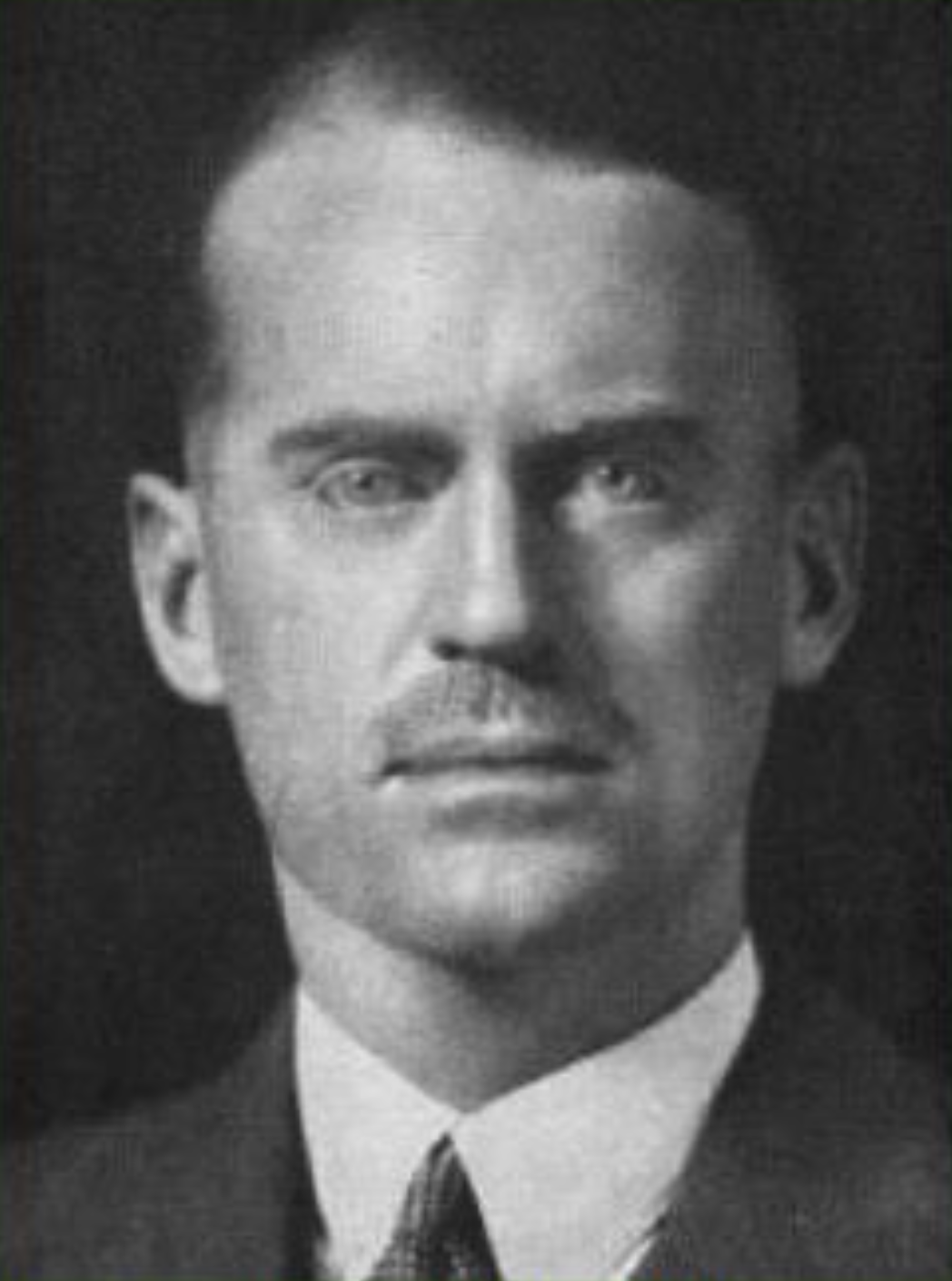
Undated photo

In 1933, Fairbairn resigned his state seat to contest the House of Representatives seat of Flinders at a by-election following the resignation of former prime minister Stanley Bruce. He was successful, and held the seat until his death. He regularly flew between his property and Canberra and was recognised as an authority on aviation. He flew around Australia in 1935, and in 1936 he bought a De Havilland Dragonfly in England and flew it back to Australia. Fairbairn's family were known as the "Flying Fairbairns". In 1935 his younger brother George Patrick Fairbairn and sister-in-law Mary (née Murray) were killed when a plane piloted by Mary crashed at Essendon North.

On 26 April 1939 he was appointed to the first Menzies Ministry as Minister for Civil Aviation, and Vice-President of the Executive Council; he also assisted the Minister for Defence. On the outbreak of war in September 1939, he travelled to Canada to help establish the British Commonwealth Air Training Plan. On 13 November 1939 he was sworn in there as the first Minister for Air by the Governor General of Canada, John Buchan, 1st Baron Tweedsmuir.

He resigned as Vice-President of the Executive Council on 26 January 1940. On 14 March 1940 he was appointed to the second Menzies Ministry as Minister for Civil Aviation and Minister for Air. In July 1940 he flew himself around Australia in his Dragonfly to review all RAAF stations.

== Death and legacy ==
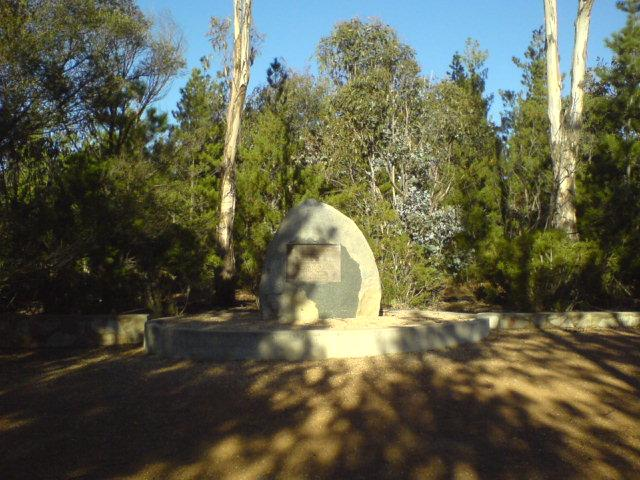
Memorial opened by Sir Robert Menzies in 1960 (20th anniversary).

On 13 August 1940, in what became known as the Canberra air disaster, a RAAF Lockheed Hudson flying from Melbourne to Canberra crashed during its landing approach into a small hill to the east of the airport. Four crew and six passengers, including the Chief of the General Staff and three Federal Government ministers, including Fairbairn, were killed in the accident. Prime Minister Robert Menzies said in parliament, next day,

His mind and character were strong, and he displayed an unusual combination of cheerful fellowship with, perhaps, a hint of Scottish dourness. He was slow to speech, but, once engaged, he was gifted in exposition and resolute in advocacy of what he believed to be true.

He was survived by his wife, a daughter, and a son, Geoffrey Forrester (1924–1980) who lectured in history at the Australian National University.

Fairbairn Airbase, (the eastern component of what is now known as Canberra Airport), was named after him in 1953. In 1962 the military side of the Airport was renamed RAAF Base Fairbairn. The RAAF base has now been decommissioned, but the North-East quadrant of the Airport still retains the Fairbairn name.

Sir David Fairbairn, his first cousin once removed, was also a federal politician.

Political offices
Preceded by Harold Thorby	Minister for Civil Aviation; 1939–1940	Succeeded by Arthur Fadden
New title	Minister for Air; 1939–1940	Succeeded by Arthur Fadden
Preceded by George McLeay	Vice-President of the Executive Council; 1939–1940	Succeeded by Percy Spender
Parliament of Australia
Preceded by Stanley Bruce	Member for Flinders; 1933–1940	Succeeded by Rupert Ryan
