= George Fairbairn (politician) =

Australian politician and pastoralist

Sir George Fairbairn
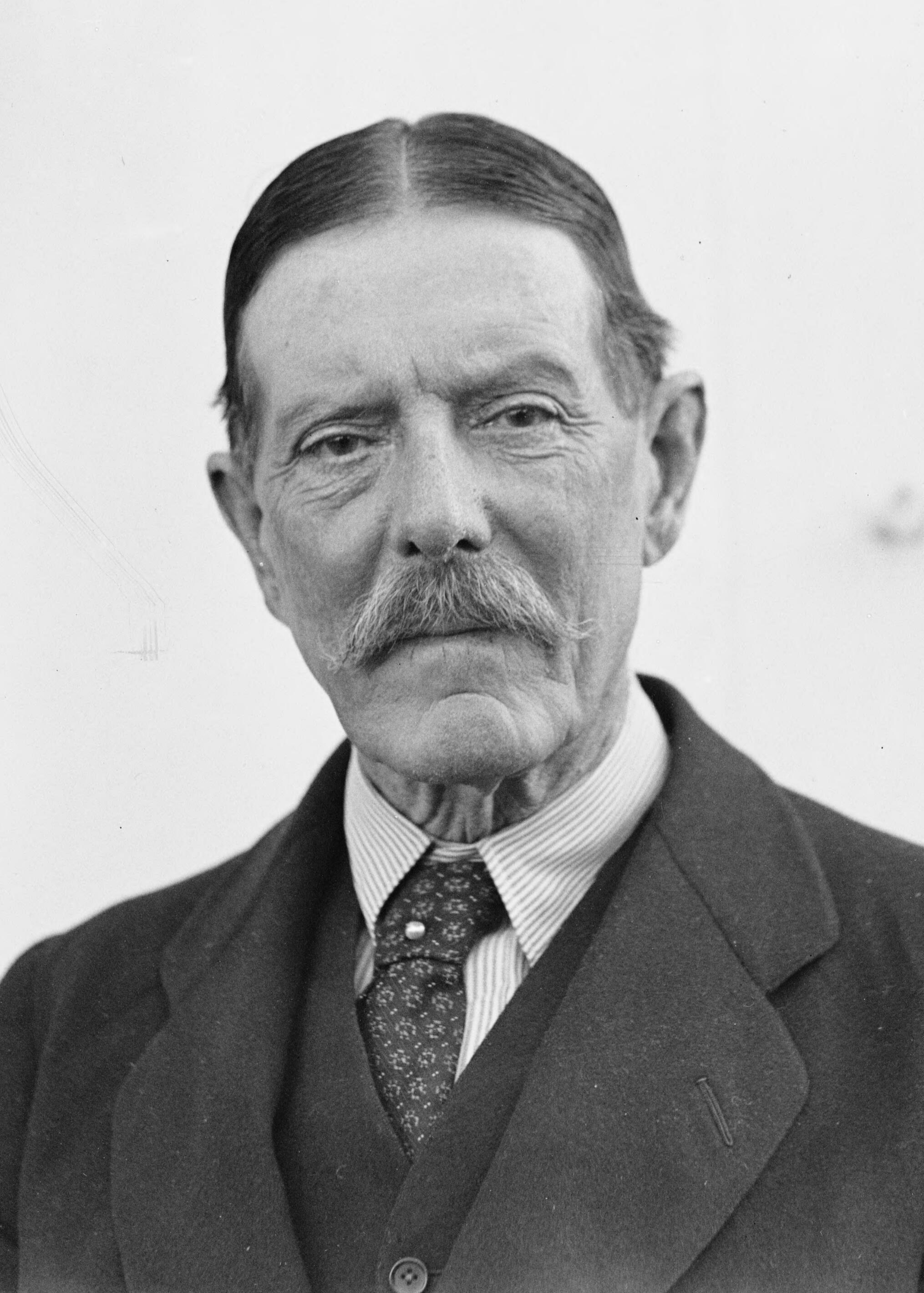
- Fairbairn in 1927

Member of the Australian Parliament for Fawkner
- In office 12 December 1906 – 31 May 1913
- Preceded by: New seat
- Succeeded by: Joseph Hannan

Senator for Victoria
- In office 1 July 1917 – 30 June 1923

Personal details
- Born: 23 March 1855 Geelong, Victoria
- Died: 23 October 1943 (aged 88) Melbourne, Victoria
- Party: Independent (1906–09); Liberal (1909–17); Nationalist (1917–22)
- Spouse(s): 1) Jessie Kate Prell; 2) Lorna Bessie
- Relations: David Fairbairn (grandson); James Fairbairn (nephew); Steve Fairbairn (brother)
- Education: Cambridge University
- Occupation: Farmer

Sir George Fairbairn (23 March 1855 – 23 October 1943) was an Australian pastoralist and politician. He was a member of the House of Representatives from 1906 to 1913, representing the Victorian seat of Fawkner, and later served as a Senator for Victoria from 1917 to 1923.

== Early life ==
Fairbairn was born on 23 March 1855 in New Town, Victoria. He was one of seven children (including six sons) born to Virginia Charlotte (née Armytage) and George Fairbairn. His father was a Scottish immigrant who amassed substantial landholdings in Australia and married the daughter of one of his business partners George Armytage. Fairbairn commenced his education at Geelong Grammar School, and later spent time in Edinburgh where he was taught by his uncle Patrick Fairbairn.

In 1874 Fairbairn went up to Jesus College, Cambridge. He rowed for Jesus College Boat Club in 1875 and 1876, the first two years of an 11-year stretch up to 1885 when it won the Cambridge head of the river races. His younger brother Steve went on to become an influential rowing coach at the club. Fairbairn returned to Australia in 1876 and in the following years managed Peak Downs and Barcaldine stations in Queensland. He married Jessie Kate Prell in November 1880 and they had a son and a daughter. In 1890, he took over the family farm at Lara, Victoria and subsequently acquired other farms in Victoria and New South Wales and developed numerous business interests. He was president of the Employers' Federation of Australia for six years.

== Politics ==
In 1903 Fairbairn was elected to the Victorian Legislative Assembly seat of Toorak which he held until 1906 when he resigned to contest the newly created seat of Fawkner in the Australian House of Representatives. Fairbairn won Fawkner at the 1906 election. Fairbairn was endorsed by the Anti-Socialists, but campaigned as an independent Protectionist. He did not sit with the Anti-Socialists.

In 1909, he helped create the union of the non-Labor parties into the "fusion" He lost Fawkner in the 1913 election, following an adverse electoral redistribution, but he was elected to the Senate from 1917 election, but did not stand for re-election at the 1922 election.

== Personal life ==
Fairbairn's first wife died in 1921 and he married Lorna Bessie in 1924. He was Agent-General for Victoria in London from 1924 to 1927. He was knighted in the 1926 Birthday Honours. He was survived by his second wife and his son, Clive Prell Fairbairn. He was grandfather of David Fairbairn, member for Farrer from 1949 to 1975 and government minister from 1962 to 1972. He was uncle of James Fairbairn, a Minister for Civil Aviation from 1939 until his death in a plane crash in 1940.

== The 'Senator George' ==
In 1923, Fairbairn funded the construction of a rowing eight for Thames Rowing Club, where his brother Steve was then Captain. As such it was named the 'Senator George'. The boat was designed by Oxford zoologist and rowing coach G.C.Bourne according to his theories about streamlining. The boat won the Grand Challenge Cup at Henley Royal Regatta that year, with Steve's son Ian Fairbairn at stroke, and had a successful subsequent racing career. Its bow now hangs in the Thames RC clubhouse bar in Putney.

Parliament of Australia
New division	Member for Fawkner; 1906 – 1913	Succeeded by Joseph Hannan
