= Christopher Binse =

Australian robber

Christopher Dean "Badness" Binse (born c. 1969) is an Australian armed robber and prison escapee. His crimes include armed robberies, shooting at police and methamphetamine abuse. He has the distinction of being called "Australia's weirdest criminal" by several news publications. Binse is currently incarcerated in HM Barwon Prison in Lara, Victoria, where he is serving a lengthy sentence in complete solitary confinement.

In 1992, two Victoria Police detectives were charged with taking a $19,750 bribe to organise bail for Binse.

In 2016 his life story, Mayhem: The Strange and Savage Saga of Christopher 'Badness' Binse by Matthew Thompson was published. In 2018, The Age documented some of Binse's experiences.
