= George Fairbairn (pastoralist) =

Australian pastoralist and politician

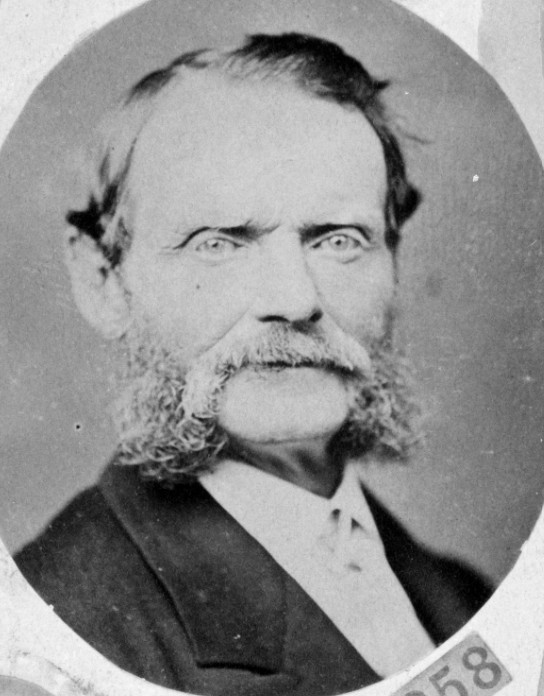
- George Fairbairn c. 1872

Member of the Victorian Legislative Assembly
- In office 1 November 1864 – 1 December 1865
- Preceded by: William Mollison
- Succeeded by: John MacPherson
- Constituency: Dundas and Follett

Personal details
- Born: 28 April 1816 Berwickshire, Scotland
- Died: 18 July 1895 (aged 79) Queenscliff, Victoria, Australia
- Spouse: Virginia Armytage (m. 1854)
- Relatives: Patrick Fairbairn (brother); George Fairbairn (son); Steve Fairbairn (son)
- Occupation: Pastoralist

George Fairbairn (28 April 1816 – 18 July 1895) was an Australian pastoralist and politician. He was born in Scotland and arrived in Australia in 1839.

== Early life ==
Fairbairn was born on 28 April 1816 in Berwickshire, Scotland, the son of Jessie (née Johnston) and John Fairbairn. His father was a sheep farmer. His brother Patrick became a minister in the Free Church of Scotland.

== Pastoral holdings ==
Fairbairn arrived in the Colony of South Australia in January 1839, together with five Scottish companions. On their arrival they camped near Glenelg, living on salt pork and damper and occasionally shooting parrots and turkeys. (Note: The source, a contemporaneous obituary, does not describe what "turkey" is meant. There are several Australian bird species known as bush (or brush) turkeys, but none are common in South Australia. It may not be possible to determine what bird is referred to.) After two months they moved to the Port Phillip District, where they established a sheep run on the Werribee River near Ballan.

In September 1842, Fairbairn was appointed manager of a sheep station on the Glenelg River in the Western District. He came into conflict with the local Indigenous population, who killed or captured hundreds of sheep. There was a violent confrontation between the groups on at least one occasion which ended with two Indigenous people being shot. By 1846, Fairbairn had acquired 2,000 sheep and had capital of £1,000 (equivalent to $160,000 in 2022).

Fairbairn ultimately held "several million acres" of land across multiple colonies. A member of the so-called "squattocracy", he was known as one of the "shepherd kings" and was reputedly the first man in Australia to own over a million sheep. His properties included Eli Elwah in the Riverina, Kongbool and Lal Lal in Victoria, Illilawa, Peak Downs, Logan Downs, Magenta, and Barcaldine Downs. He was also a director of a number of businesses related to his pastoral leases, including the Australian Frozen Meat Export Company.

== Politics ==
A long-serving member of the Corio Shire Council, Fairbairn was elected to the Victorian Legislative Assembly at the 1864 general election, representing the seat of Dundas and Follett. He did not speak regularly in parliament but was a supporter of James McCulloch's government. He resigned from parliament on 1 December 1865.

== Personal life ==
In February 1854, Fairbairn married Virginia Charlotte Armytage, the daughter of his business partner George Armytage. The couple had six sons and a daughter, including federal MP George Fairbairn and prominent rowing coach Steve Fairbairn. His grandson James Fairbairn and great-grandson David Fairbairn were both federal government ministers.

Fairbairn retired to his Pirra Homestead near Lara, Victoria. He died on 18 July 1895 in Queenscliff, Victoria.
