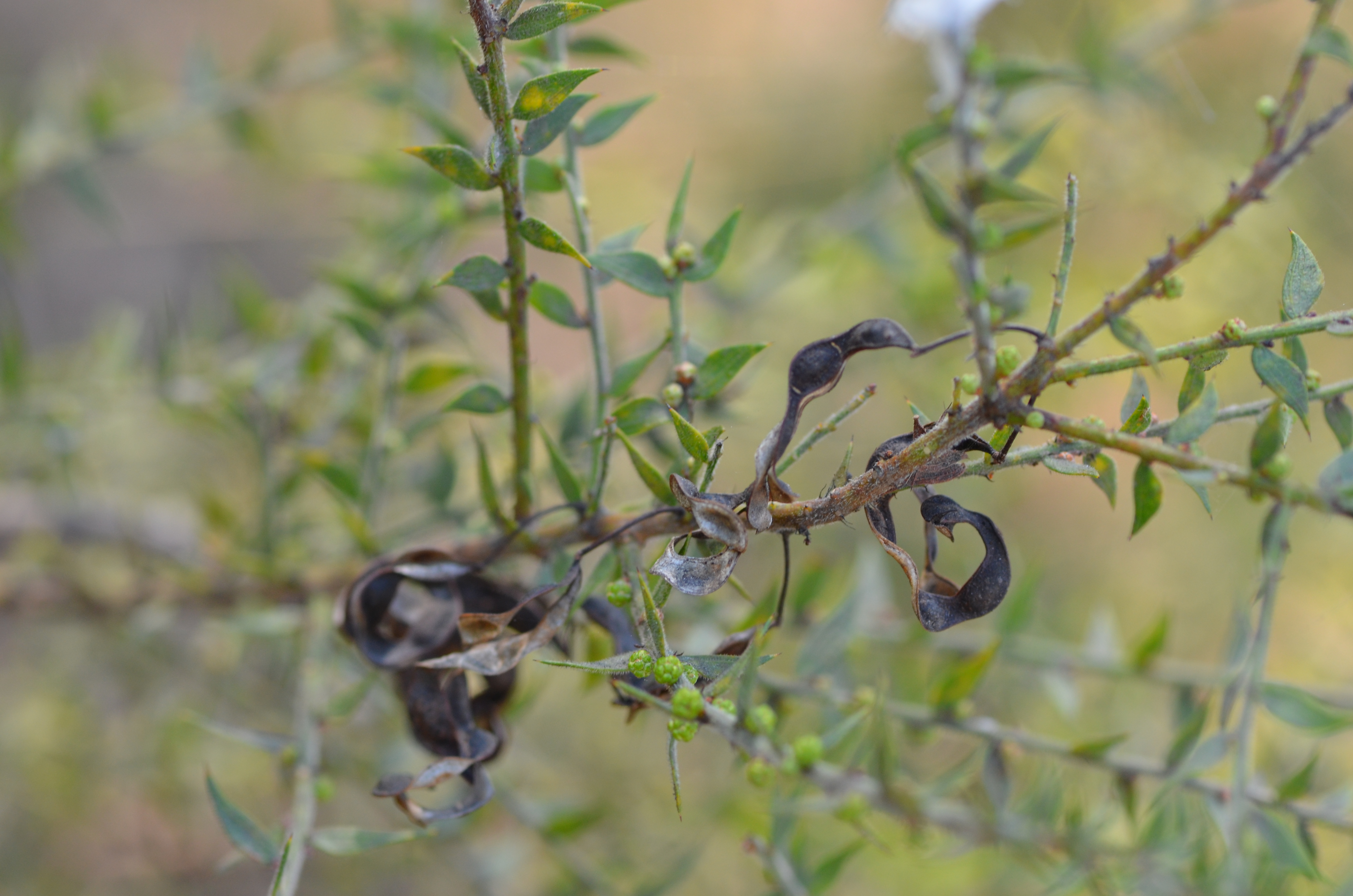

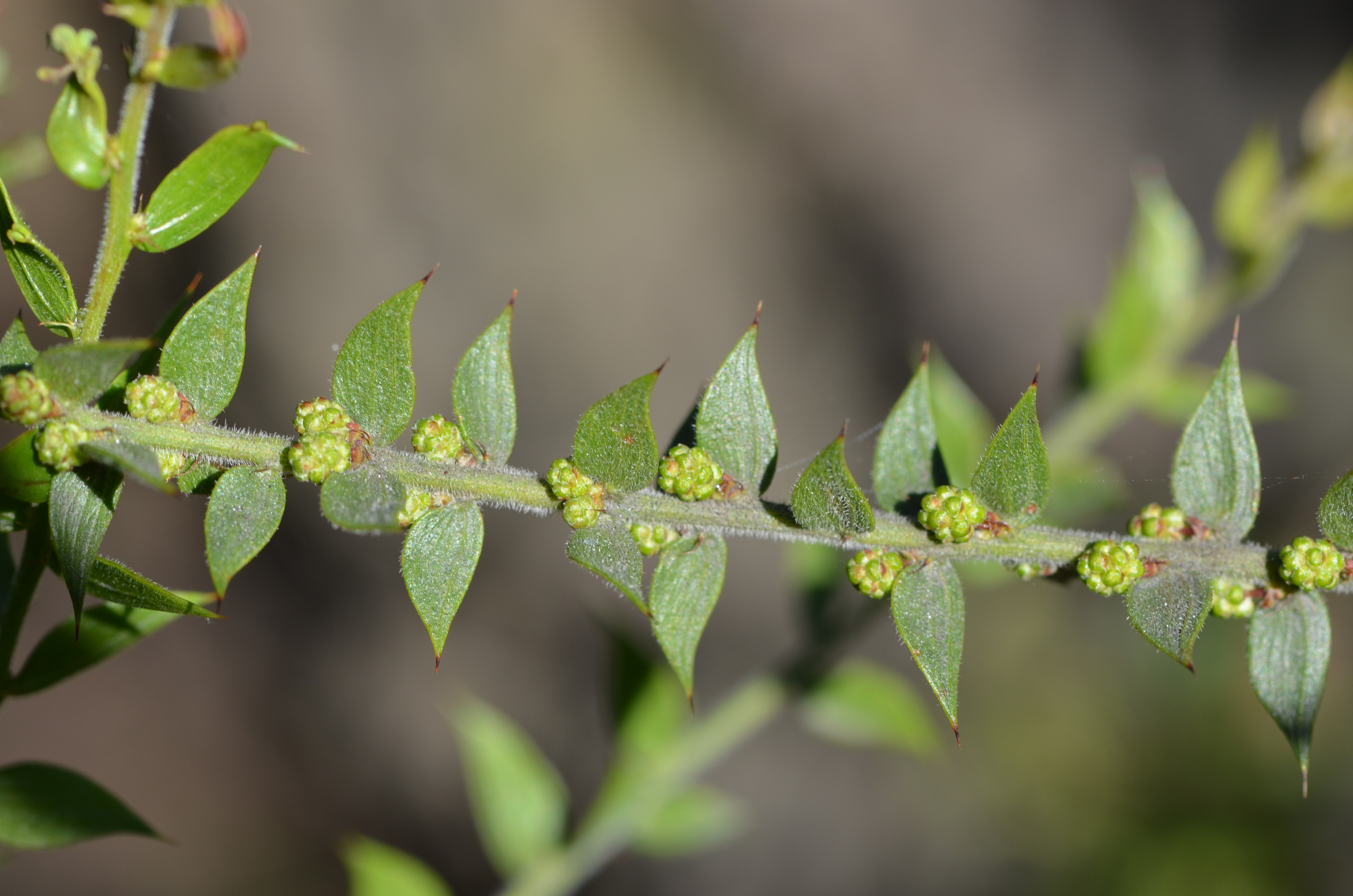

Scientific classification
- Kingdom: Plantae
- Clade: Tracheophytes
- Clade: Angiosperms
- Clade: Eudicots
- Clade: Rosids
- Order: Fabales
- Family: Fabaceae
- Subfamily: Caesalpinioideae
- Clade: Mimosoid clade
- Genus: Acacia
- Species: A. amblygona

Binomial name
- Acacia amblygona A.Cunn. ex Benth.
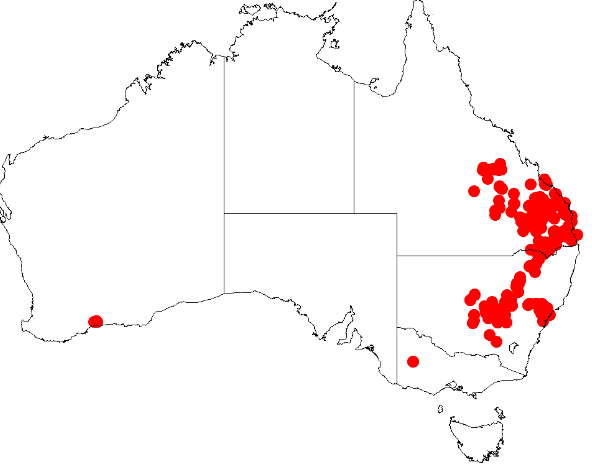
- Occurrence data from AVH

Synonyms
- Acacia nernstii F.Muell.; Racosperma amblygonum (Benth.) Pedley; Acacia pravifolia auct. non F.Muell.: Lebler, B.A. (1981)

= Acacia amblygona =

Fan wattle

Species of legume

Acacia amblygona, commonly known as fan wattle or fan leaf wattle, is a species of flowering plant in the family Fabaceae and is endemic to continental Australia. It is a sprawling, sometimes prostrate shrub with sharply-pointed, lance-shaped, tapering phyllodes, golden-yellow flowers arranged in a spherical head of 10 to 18 in the axils of phyllodes, and curved, coiled or twisted pods up to 70 mm (2.8 in) long.

== Description ==
Acacia amblygona is a sprawling, sometimes prostrate shrub that typically grows to a height of 0.4–1 m (1 ft 4 in – 3 ft 3 in), its branchlets usually hairy. Its phyllodes are sessile, egg-shaped to lance-shaped or elliptic,8–15 mm (0.31–0.59 in) long and 2–4 mm (0.079–0.157 in) with and tapered to a sharply-pointed tip. The flowers are golden-yellow and arranged in groups of 10 to 18 in a more or less spherical head 4.0–6.5 mm (0.16–0.26 in) wide, on a peduncle 6–12 mm (0.24–0.47 in) long. Flowering occurs from July to October and the pods are curved, coiled or twisted, constricted over the seeds, 30–70 mm (1.2–2.8 in) long and 3–5 mm (0.12–0.20 in) wide containing seeds 3–7 mm (0.12–0.28 in) long and 3–5 mm (0.12–0.20 in) wide.

== Taxonomy ==
Acacia amblygona was first formally described in 1842 by the botanist George Bentham from an unpublished manuscript by Allan Cunningham, in William Jackson Hooker's London Journal of Botany.

== Distribution and habitat ==
Fan wattle grows in forest or mallee communities, often on stony soils. In Western Australia it is native to an area along the south coast near Ravensthorpe in the Esperance Plains bioregion. In eastern Australia it is found in coastal and inland parts of New South Wales north from Lake Cargelligo and extends as far as the Expedition Range and Peak Downs in Queensland.

== See also ==
- List of Acacia species
