= Sharon Taylor (disambiguation) =

Sharon Taylor (born 1981) is a Canadian actress.

Sharon Taylor may also refer to:

- Sharon Taylor (murder victim)
- Sharon Taylor, Baroness Taylor of Stevenage (born 1956), British politician and life peer
- Sharon Taylor, co-owner of Bracknell Bees
