= Ashley Coulston =

Australian murderer

Ashley Mervyn Coulston
- Born: 10 October 1956
- Status: Imprisoned
- Convictions: Murder (3 counts); Armed robbery (2 counts); False imprisonment (2 counts); Reckless conduct endangering life (2 counts); Intentionally causing serious injury Common assault Using a firearm with intention to avoid lawful apprehension
- Penalty: 3 life sentences with 7 years without parole

Ashley Mervyn Coulston is an Australian triple murderer serving three consecutive sentences of life imprisonment for a 1992 triple murder in Burwood in the eastern suburbs of Melbourne. He also attempted to abduct and rob a couple on St Kilda Road in inner Melbourne several months later. The failed abduction attempt led police to his involvement in the triple murder.

== Early life ==
Coulston grew up on his family's dairy farm in Tangambalanga. His family were described as law abiding. On 19 April 1971, Coulston, aged 14 years and armed with a .22 rifle, abducted two female school teachers from a house next to the Tangambalanga school. He had planned the abduction in advance, keeping the teachers, Halinka Watson (20) and Carol Scott (21), under surveillance prior to the abduction. He stole some money and forced the two women into one of their cars and made them drive him interstate towards Sydney. At 5am the next day, the vehicle stopped at a Gundagai roadhouse for food. The women escaped and attracted attention to their situation. Arrested, Coulston was sent by the Children's Court to Turana Youth Training Centre. Publicity following the abductions made his family sell the farm a year or so later and move interstate to New South Wales, buying a dairy in Kyogle. Later his father retired, selling the dairy and moving to a property on Brisbane's southern outskirts. Coulston joined his family in Brisbane in 1979.

== Trans-Tasman voyages ==
In 1988, Coulston came to media attention when he attempted to sail his custom built 2.4-metre (8 ft) vessel which he named G'Day 88 from Australia to New Zealand across the Tasman Sea. On 26 January 1988, Coulston left Port Stephens in G'Day 88, a vessel he designed and built himself however he ran into troubles following Cyclone Bola and on 12 March 1988, activated his vessel's emergency beacon. He was rescued by a passing tanker just north of New Zealand's North Island after spending 46 days at sea in stormy weather. The remains of his vessel washed up on the New Zealand shore several months later. He was dubbed "Captain Bathtub".

On 25 October 1988, Coulston attempted his voyage once again sailing from New Zealand to Australia, successfully arriving in Brisbane on 6 January 1989.

== Criminal activities ==
=== Triple murder ===
Coulston returned to live in Victoria in 1989. On 29 July 1992, two students advertised in the Herald Sun newspaper for a tenant to share their home in Burwood after a housemate decided to leave the premises and return home to live with their parents.

Kerryn Henstridge, 22, Anne Smerdon, 22, and Peter Dempsey, 27, the brother-in-law of one of the women, were forced into separate rooms and hogtied using cable ties before Coulston shot them execution style in the back of the head with a sawn-off .22 rifle fitted with a home-made silencer made from an oil filter.

=== Attempted abduction ===
On 1 September 1992, Coulston armed himself with the same weapon used to commit the earlier murders and some cable ties, then drove to St Kilda Road and parked his car near the National Gallery of Victoria. He then approached a couple and attempted to abduct them. The couple offered Coulston their money, which he took. He then proceeded to restrain the couple using the cable ties. Whilst attempting to restrain the female he was overpowered by the male who had grabbed the rifle and threw it aside allowing the couple to escape and raise the alarm with two nearby security guards. The security guards gave chase however Coulston fired at the guards, hitting one in the hip. Coulston was eventually arrested by police at the scene and taken into custody. The rifle used in the abduction attempt would later link Coulston to the triple murders in Burwood several months earlier and in addition the cable ties were the same.

=== Trial ===
He was originally sentenced to three consecutive life sentences with a non-parole period of 30 years, but was granted a retrial on the murder charges after appeal; he was re-sentenced to seven years on appeal, increased from four years six months, by the Crown on the remaining nine charges. Coulston did not speak at all during either trial, and was sentenced to three consecutive life sentences, to be served cumulatively with the seven-year sentence for the remaining offences; Justice Norman O'Bryan refused to fix a non-parole period, calling the murders "cold-blooded", "heinous" and "wicked", and telling Coulston that "you have forfeited forever your entitlement to live outside the confines of a prison". No motive was established for the murders as Coulston exercised his right to remain silent and both a defence psychologist and psychiatrist found normal intelligence and no psychological disturbance or personality disorder with Coulston.

=== Prison life ===
Detained at HM Prison Barwon, in 2005 it was reported that Coulston had collected fifteen television images of the assault of a fully clothed woman. The images were stored on his personal computer.

== Suspect in other crimes ==
In 2000, the Australian Police Journal published an article on Coulston regarding the forthcoming creation of the National Criminal Investigation DNA Database (NCIDD) and that the Queensland Police Service and the New South Wales Police Force were seeking to recover DNA samples from the "Balaclava Killer" and the "Sutherland Rapist" cases to compare with Coulston's DNA. Coulston shared the same rare blood type of group A secretor with the "Balaclava Killer" and the "Sutherland Rapist".

The "Balaclava Killer" had raped several women armed with a sawn-off .22 rifle often while their bound male partner watched in the Gold Coast, Queensland between December 1979 and October 1980. The attacker used a motorbike to leave the scene of one attack. In February 1980, an attack occurred at Tweed Heads, a male partner Jeffrey Parkinson fought back and was shot dead allowing his unharmed female companion to flee. Coulston had lived with his family in nearby Brisbane since 1979 and in late 1980 Coulston moved from Brisbane to southern Sydney in Cronulla and at times lived in Bexley, Kingsgrove and Oatley between 1980 and 1987.

In the 1980s, in Sydney's southern suburbs women were attacked by an attacker dubbed the "Sutherland Rapist" and which is now understood by police to be at least two separate attackers. One of whom had the blood type of group A secretor who committed offences between 1985 and 1987 in the Sutherland Shire and Hurstville including targeting couples in lovers' lanes bounding their male partners armed with a sawn-off shotgun wearing several disguises. In 1986, Coulston was sacked from the company he had worked for since 1980 and he spent most of 1987 and his savings of $10,000 constructing the yacht, G'day 88, in a backyard in southern Sydney.
