= Patrick Fairbairn =

Scottish minister and theologian

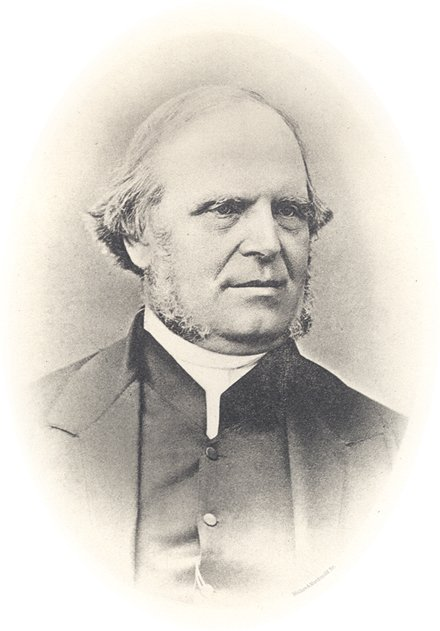
- Patrick Fairbairn from Memoirs and portraits of one hundred Glasgow men

Personal details
- Born: 28 January 1805
- Died: 6 August 1874 (aged 69)
- Education: University of Edinburgh

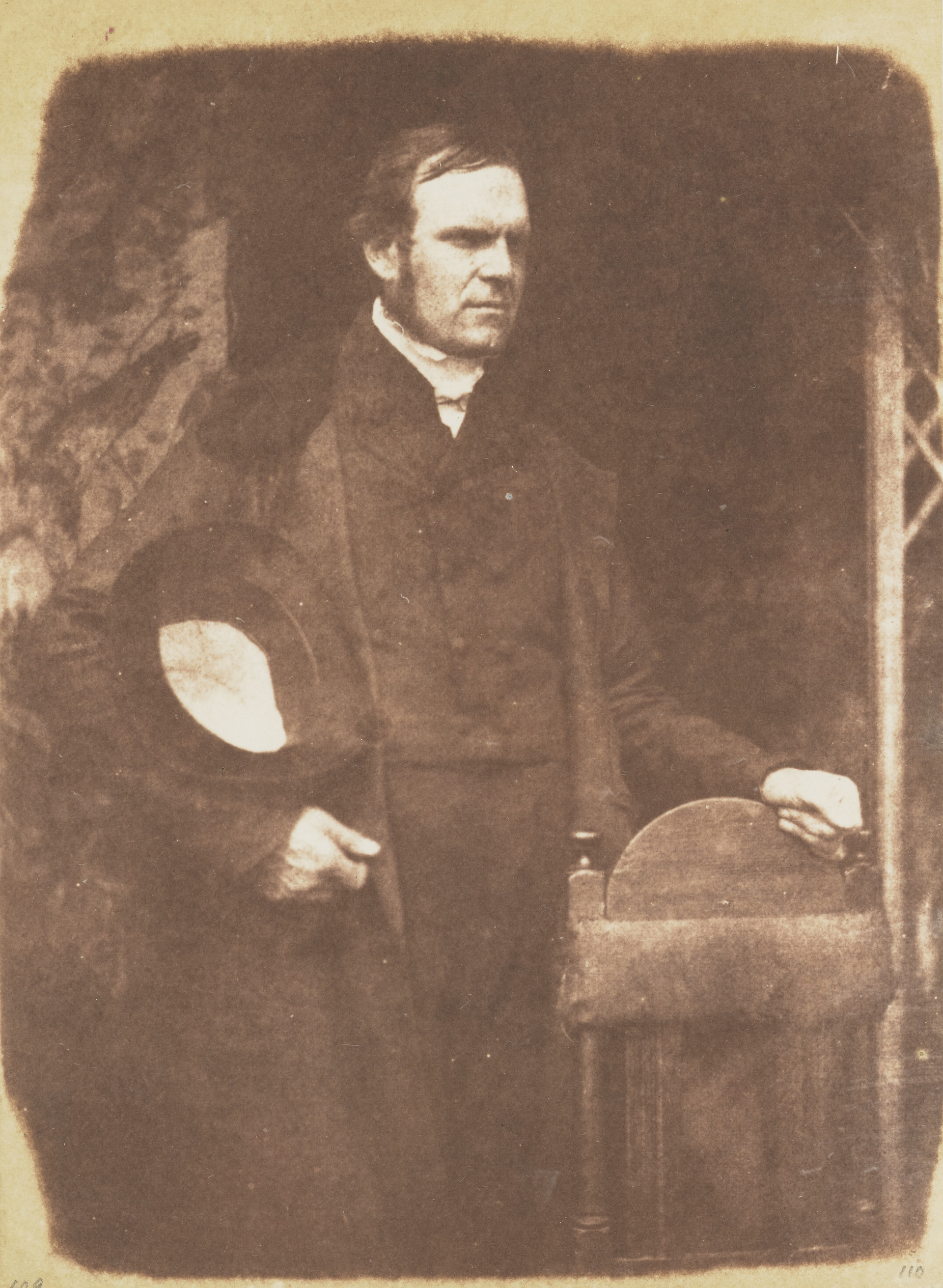
Patrick Fairbairn by David Octavius Hill and Robert Adamson

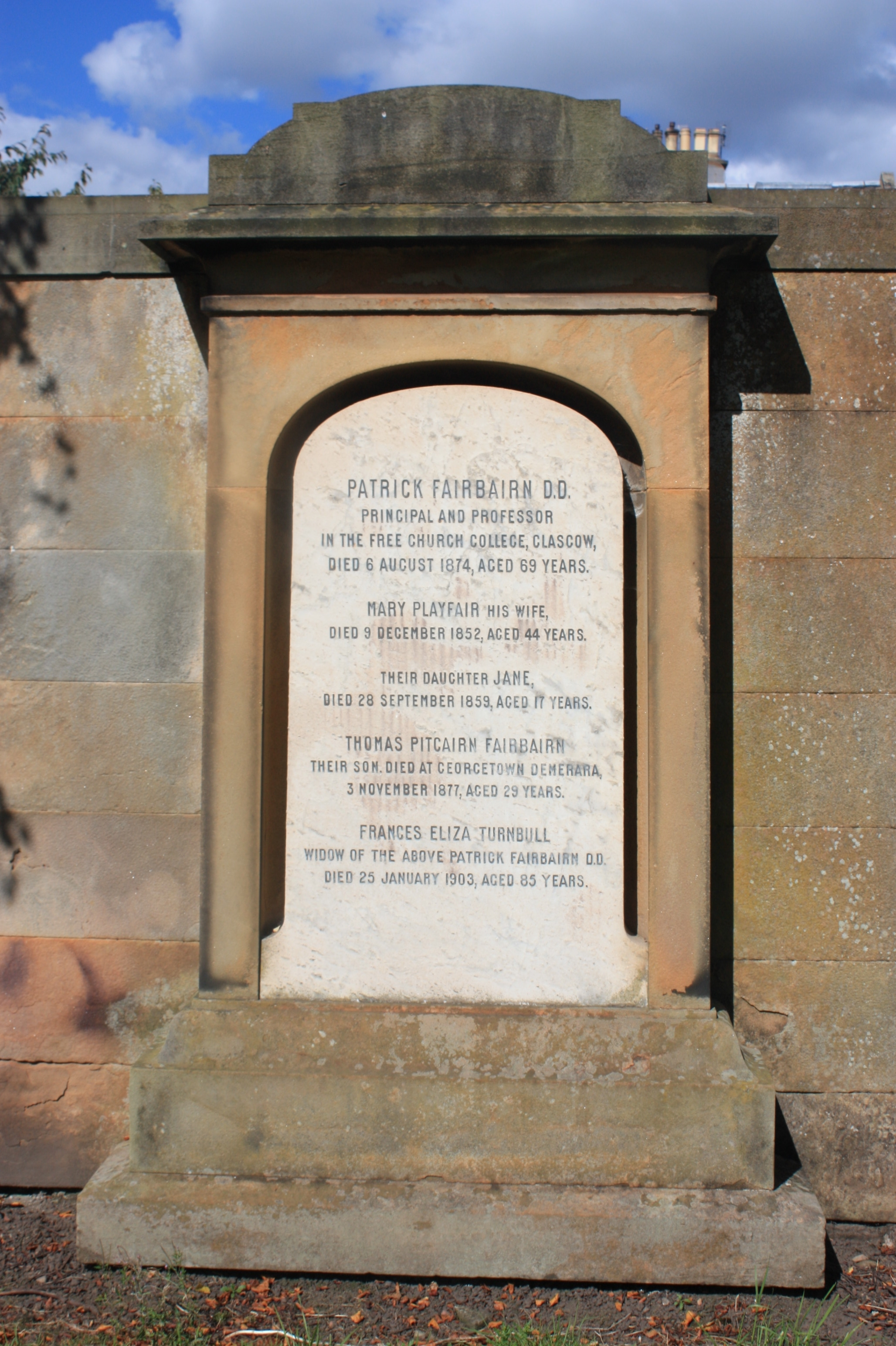
Fairbairn's grave, Grange Cemetery

Patrick Fairbairn (28 January 1805 – 6 August 1874) was a Scottish Free Church minister and theologian. He was Moderator of the General Assembly 1864/65.

== Early life and career ==
He was born in Halyburton, Greenlaw, Berwickshire, on 28 January 1805. Patrick was the second son of John Fairbairn, farmer, and Jessie Johnston, Middlestots. He was educated at Greenlaw School and studied at the University of Edinburgh at the age of 13. He graduated in 1826 and was licensed to preach by Presbytery of Duns on 3 October 1826. He began employment as a tutor in the family of Captain Balfour of Balfour and was ordained to Ringansay in Orkney on 28 July 1830 and remained there for six years. He translated to the Extension Church at Bridgeton, Glasgow on 16 March 1837. Fairbairn translated, and admitted to Salton, East Lothian on 25 June 1840.

== After the Disruption ==
After the Disruption of 1843, Fairbairn joined the Free Church of Scotland. In 1852 he became assistant to Prof Maclagan at the Free Church Theological College in Aberdeen and in 1853, the General Assembly appointed him as successor to Maclagan as Professor of Theology. He then lived at 25 Bon Accord Terrace in Aberdeen.

When the Free Church College was founded in Glasgow in 1856, Fairbairn became Professor of Church History and Exegesis, and was made Principal the following year. He held these positions until his death in 1874. He was elected Moderator of the General Assembly in 1864, succeeding Rev Roderick McLeod, and was succeeded in turn in 1865 by Rev James Begg.

In 1845, Fairbairn published The Typology of Scripture. MacLehose (1886) noted that this was "one of the most important theological works of its day," and suggested that it "appeared at a time when Scotland was singularly barren in theological scholarship, and gained for its author a great reputation, not only in his own country but also in England and America."

Fairbairn's work on typology was followed by Prophecy viewed in its Distinctive Nature, its Special Functions, and Proper Interpretation (1856) and Hermeneutical Manual; or, Introduction to the exegetical study of the Scriptures of the New Testament (1858). He also wrote commentaries on Ezekiel and the Pastoral epistles, and edited the Imperial Bible Dictionary.

Fairbairn was "large and imposing in appearance," but "modest and retiring in his habits and feelings." He was married three times, but little is known of his private life because Fairbairn "asked his friends not to allow his biography to be written, and destroyed letters and other documents which might have led them to a disregard of his wish."

Walker (1964) suggested that Fairbairn's "zeal for ascertaining and propagating the truth of God ... continued steadfastly with all the vigour of his powerful intellect until the closing days of his life."

He died at home, 13 Elmbank Crescent, in west Glasgow.

He is buried against the north wall of the Grange Cemetery in Edinburgh with his wives Mary Playfair (1808-1852) and Frances Eliza Turnbull (1828-1903).

His Glasgow home was demolished in the late 20th century.

== Works ==
- The Typology of Scripture, 2 vols. (Edinburgh, 1845–7, and various editions)
- Jonah, his Life, Character, and Mission (1849)
- Ezekiel and the Book of his Prophecy (Edinburgh, 1851)
- Opinions of Reformers regarding the Sabbath (Edinburgh, 1852)
- The Christian Ministry (Edinburgh, 1852)
- Prophecy, its Nature, Function, and Interpretation (Edinburgh, 1856)
- Hermeneutical Manual (Edinburgh, 1858)
- The Revelation of Law in Scripture (Cunningham Lectures; Edinburgh, 1869)
- The Pastoral Epistles of St Paul (Edinburgh, 1874)
- Pastoral Theology (Edinburgh, 1875) which was published posthumously and contained a Memoir by James Dodds.
- He edited The Imperial Bible Dictionary (London, 1864–6, 2 vols.), contributing many important articles, and for Clark's Biblical Cabinet and Foreign Theol. Library he translated in whole or in part several works from the German — Hengstenberg's Commentary on the Psalms and Commentary on the Revelation, etc.

== Family ==
He married:

- (1) 27 March 1833, Margaret (died 4 May 1837), daughter of Alexander Pitcairn, merchant, Edinburgh, and had issue —
  - John, born 22 January 1834, died in Australia 1874
  - Alexander, born 7 October 1836, died 21 May 1837
  - Margaret, born 27 April 1837, died 22 May 1837
- (2) 23 July 1839, Mary (died 9 December 1852), daughter of Patrick Playfair, merchant, Glasgow, and had issue —
  - Patrick, born 21 Sept. 1840, died at Demerara, 20 March 1910
  - Jane Jessie, born 27 September 1842, died 28 September 1859
  - Thomas Pitcairn, born 16 March 1848, died 3 November 1877
  - Marian, born 9 December 1852 (married Alexander Guthrie, merchant, Liverpool, son of Thomas Guthrie)
- (3) 21 September 1861, Frances Eliza Turnbull, Eyemouth, who died 25 Jan. 1903, aged 85.

His nephews via his brother George, who became a wealthy grazier in Australia, included politician Sir George and prominent rowing coach Steve.
