= Melbourne Youth Justice Centre =

Australian custodial facility for young offenders

- Location in Victoria
- Location: Parkville, Victoria, Australia; 37°46′37″S 144°56′43″E
- Status: Operational
- Capacity: 84
- Opened: 1993
- Managed by: Department of Justice and Community Safety

Melbourne Youth Justice Centre (formerly Melbourne Juvenile Justice Centre and Turana Youth Training Centre) is a youth corrections facility located in Parkville, Victoria, Australia.

The facility is designed to accommodate 15-to-17-year-old males through four units and a separate multi-purpose unit that house young people on remand. Some of those housed are slightly older if they were under 18 at the time of their offence. The facility also houses 10-to-17-year-old females (remanded or sentenced) and 18-to-21-year-old women sentenced to a Youth Justice Centre Order. Young people have access to a variety of social, vocational and educational programs through Parkville College, as well as day and weekend leaves. Young people housed at the centre also have TVs in their rooms. The facility is one of Australia's most hazardous workplaces.

== History ==
Turana

Until the mid-1950s, Turana (then the Children's Welfare Department Receiving Depot for Girls and Boys) "processed" all children from infancy to 18 coming into the care of the State Government, whether offenders or under the then equivalent of care and protection orders. Children were sent from Turana to various institutions (government and non-government) throughout the state. Children who were deemed "difficult" to handle or who required psychiatric treatment or were due for court appearances in Melbourne were returned to Turana.

The opening of Winlaton Youth Training Centre (also known as Winlaton Juvenile School and Nunawading Residential Facility) in 1956 meant that young women aged 14–18 were moved out of Turana. The opening in 1960 of Pirra Children's Home (aka Pirra Girls' Home) and Allambie Reception Centre meant that young children under the care of the Family Welfare Division of the Social Welfare Department, were also moved out of Turana which could then accommodate young males only.

The name "Turana" was chosen in the late 1950s by the wife of Arthur Rylah, then Chief Secretary of Victoria. The word was believed to be Koori for "Rainbow". Ilya Nikkolai designed and remodelled the Turana Youth Remand and Classification Centre, introducing laminated tempered glass in galvanised high-tensile steel frames, solving long-standing security and maintenance problems.

== Riots ==
13–14 November 2016

The riot at the Melbourne Youth Justice Centre lasted 17 hours, ending peacefully at 6:45 p.m. Over 40 inmates were involved, with property damage and fire alarms activated. Emergency services ensured no injuries, and all youths were accounted for. Following the incident, a "significant number" of inmates were temporarily transferred to an adult prison. Victorian Minister for Families and Children, Jenny Mikakos, cited infrastructure issues, pledging redevelopment for enhanced security and safety measures.
