= HM Prison Geelong =

Former maximum security prison in central Geelong

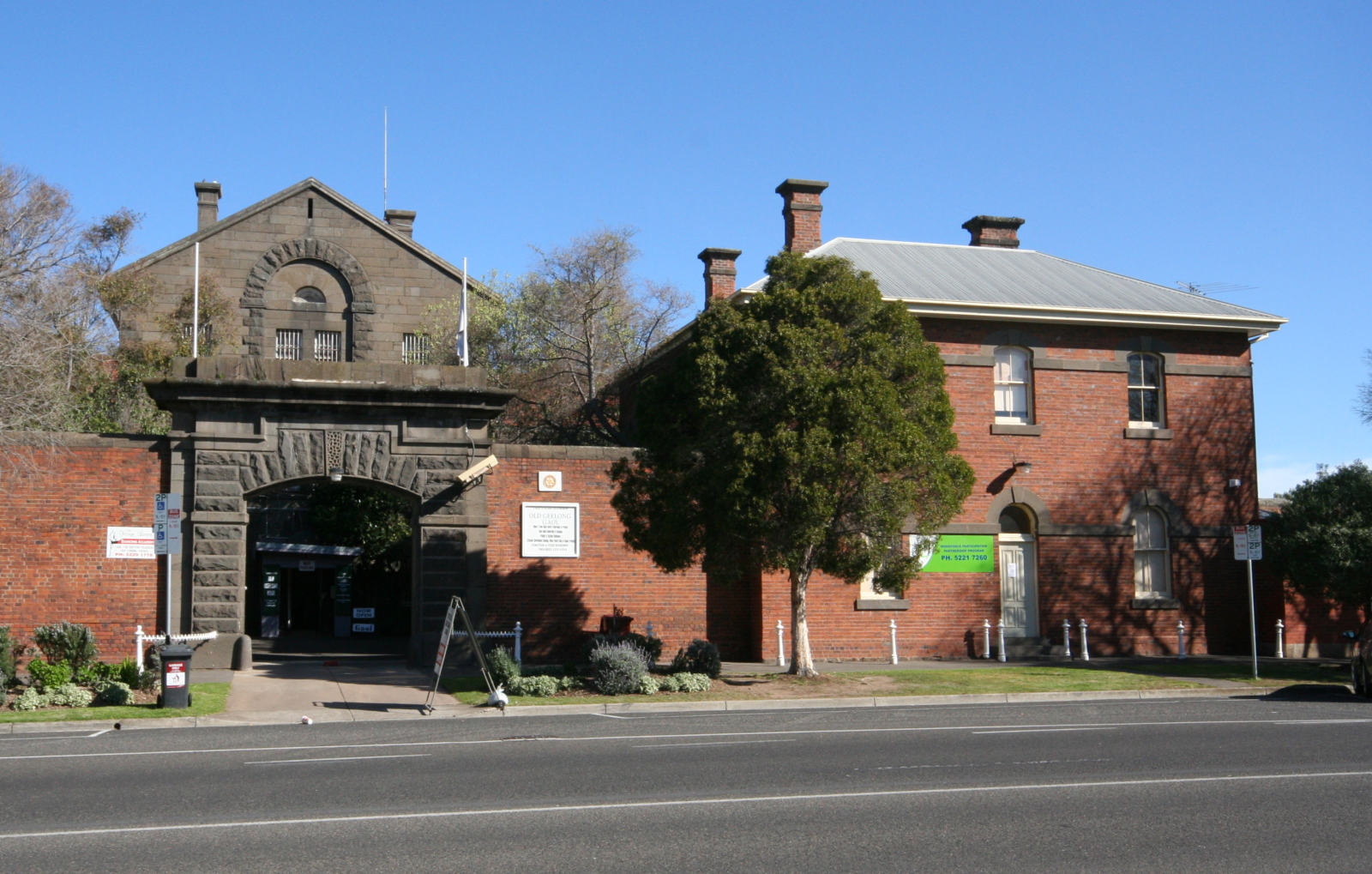
- Interactive map of HM Prison Geelong
- Location: Geelong, Victoria; 38°9′14″S 144°21′56″E
- Status: Closed
- Security class: Maximum (male)
- Capacity: 86
- Opened: 1864
- Closed: 1991
- Managed by: Corrections Victoria

HM Prison Geelong was a maximum security Australia prison located on the corner of Myers Street and Swanston Street in Geelong, Victoria, Australia. The prison was built in stages from 1849 to 1864. Its panopticon design is based on Pentonville Prison in England. The prison was officially closed in 1991 and prisoners were moved to the newly built HM Prison Barwon in Lara. The building now functions as a museum for the history of the prison.

== History ==
The gaol was built by prisoners who slept on high security barges on Corio Bay during construction. The three-storey central block is cruciform with east and west wings serving as cells, the north wing as an administration block, and the southern wing as a kitchen, hospital and a tailoring workshop. The Australian Army used the prison as a detention barracks during, and for a few years after, World War II.

The government closed the gaol in 1991 and the site now operates as a museum. It is open to the public on Saturdays, Sundays and daily during public and school holidays. The gaol remains mostly unchanged. A gallows exhibit recreates the 1863 hanging of James Murphy, who battered Constable Daniel O'Boyle to death at the Warrnambool court house. Cell 47 is of special interest as it contains a mural painted on a wall by a prisoner, titled Window of Freedom. In 2021, buildings constructed in the 1970s were removed to restore the site to a more historic look. The prison has also operated ghost tours, which have been critiqued by academics for minimizing the actions that took place at the prison.

As of 2025, the museum operates a virtual reality experience, End of the Rope: Shadows of Capital Punishment, showcasing a simulated historic execution.

=== Timeline ===
- 1853–1865: Gaol for convicts and prisoners
- 1865–1872: Industrial school for girls (typically those convicted of vagrancy)
- 1877–1940: Hospital gaol
- 1940–1947: Army detention barracks during World War II
- 1947–1958: Hospital gaol
- 1958–1991: Training prison
- 2011–current: Guided tours.

== Notable prisoners ==
- Frank McCallum (alias Captain Melville) – Australian bushranger
- Mark "Chopper" Read
- Angus Murray – an associate of gangster Squizzy Taylor who escaped in 1923 only to be executed for his role in a murder in Melbourne shortly after. He was in cell 74 and the hole in the floor that was caused when he dropped a brick upon leaving still remains.

== Executions ==
Name	Date of Execution	Crime
George Roberts	16 December 1854	Poisoned George Scott
John Gunn	9 November 1854	Murder
James Ross	22 April 1856	Murder of Elizabeth Sayer and his infant son
Owen McQueeny	20 October 1858	Murder of Elizabeth Lowe, aka the "Green Tent Murder"
James Murphy	6 November 1863	Murder of a policeman at Warrnambool Court House
Thomas Menard	28 October 1865	Murder of an Irishman named Sweeney

== In media ==
The 1994 film Everynight ... Everynight was shot at the prison. In 2015, the prison also served as a location for Total Drama Presents: The Ridonculous Race.

== See also ==
- Marngoneet Correctional Centre, 300 bed prison in Lara, Victoria, opened in 2006.
- Pirra Homestead
