= Matthew Charles Johnson =

Australian criminal and murderer (born 1973)

- Johnson in 2010
- Born: 9 August 1973 (age 53)
- Other name: The General
- Known for: Murder of Carl Williams
- Status: Imprisoned
- Allegiance: Leader, Prisoners of War
- Criminal charges: Murder; Armed robbery and aggravated burglary
- Penalty: Life with a 32-year non-parole period (2011)

Details
- Victims: Carl Williams
- Imprisoned at: HM Prison Barwon

Matthew Charles Johnson (born 9 August 1973) is an Australian criminal who is known for his extreme acts of violence, including the murder of Carl Williams, a drug dealer and serial killer. Johnson was raised in Dandenong, Melbourne, Victoria; during his childhood, he experienced familial challenges and was expelled from school in year seven. As a child, Johnson became involved in criminal activity and substance use, both of which continued into his adulthood.

Johnson has a decades-long criminal history that includes convictions for burglary, armed robbery, serious violent offences, and murder. His best-known crime is the murder of Williams in 2010, which he committed using the stem of an exercise-bike seat in Barwon Prison's Acacia Unit, where both men were imprisoned. During his trial for the murder, Johnson claimed the act was in self-defence but he was found guilty and sentenced to life imprisonment with a non-parole period of 37 years.

== Early life ==
Matthew Charles Johnson was born on 9 August 1973 to Carol Hogg and his father who died early in Johnson's childhood. Johnson was raised in Dandenong, a suburb of Melbourne, Victoria. Johnson's family life was difficult; his stepfather was described as an "aggressive alcoholic and a cruel drunk who would abuse [Johnson]". Johnson's mother described Johnson as a child who "loved sport and was a bright student", and channelled his frustrations at school through misbehaviour. Johnson's schooling was difficult: he was expelled from Lyndale Secondary College in year seven due to misbehaviour, after which his mother enrolled him in St Kilda Community High School, which catered for students from troubled backgrounds. Johnson completed his education up to a year-ten level. He became involved in minor offences and substance use, and found himself in the company of similarly troubled youths. At age 15, Johnson became involved in the use of amphetamines, marijuana, and prescription medication.

== Criminal history ==
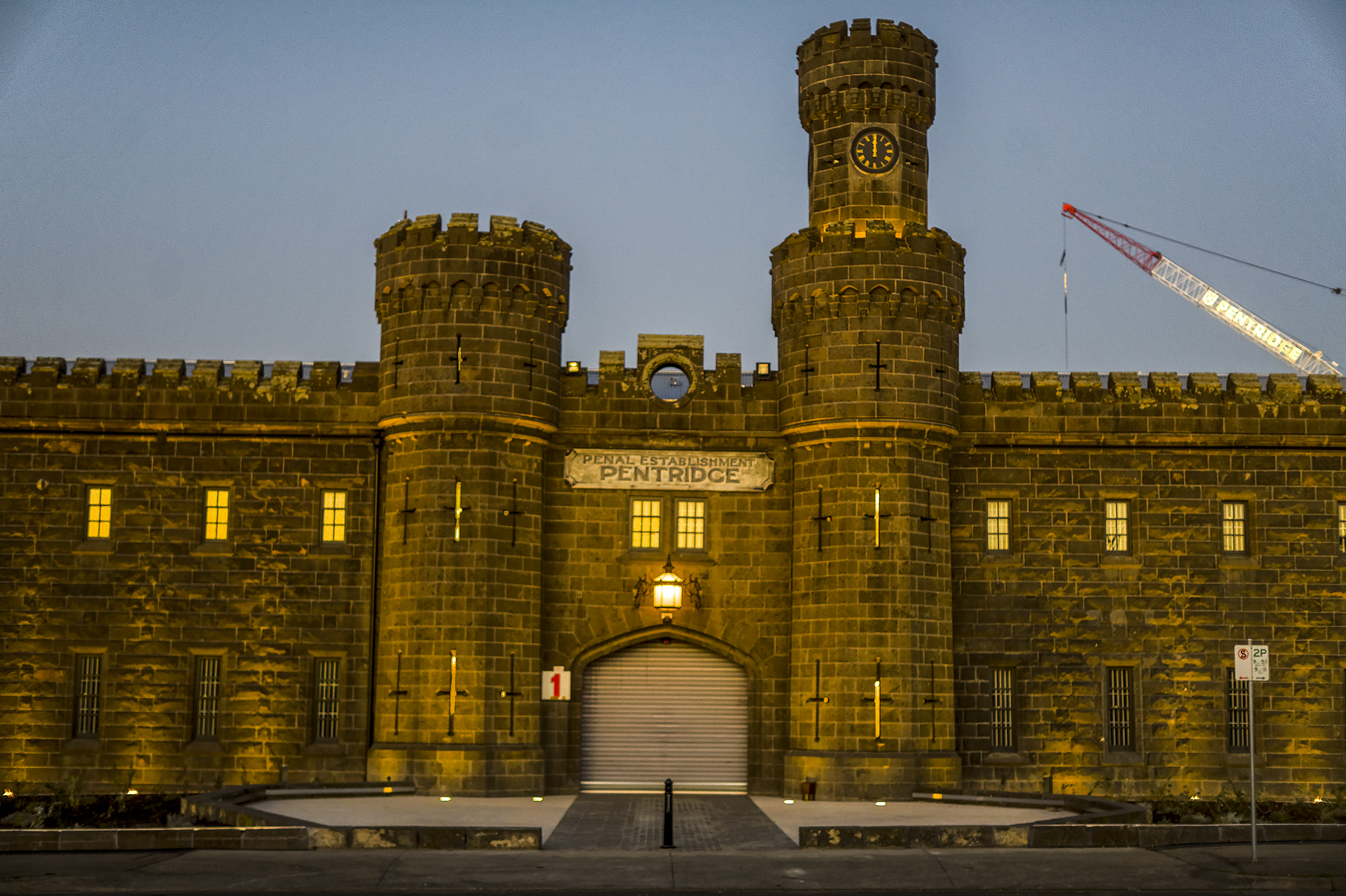
HM Prison Pentridge, where Johnson served jail time as a teenager.

Starting at age 15, Matthew Charles Johnson attended multiple youth-training centres and was jailed for burglary, motor vehicle theft, and weapons offences. As a teenager, he served three separate terms at HM Prison Pentridge, and at 18, he was imprisoned for serious theft and drug offences.

In his 20s, after his release from Pentridge, Johnson secured employment as a concreter and was able to stay out of trouble until he suffered a workplace injury. In January 1998, Johnson was involved in a series of armed robberies; during one incident, Johnson entered an elderly couple's home at Safety Beach, Victoria, with a knife. In another instance, he entered a house and held a knife to a man's throat, and threatened to "start cutting" unless he was given money. For these crimes, Johnson was given a six-year prison sentence with a four-year non-parole period.

After several prison sentences, Johnson gained a reputation in Victoria's prison system for his violent behaviour. In May 1999, Johnson was sentenced for his participation in an attack on a protected inmate in Barwon Prison, for which he received a 20-month prison sentence. In September the following year, Johnson was tried for an attack on serial killer Gregory Brazel in Barwon Prison's Acacia unit. During this trial, which was labelled the "trial from hell", Johnson and his four co-accused relentlessly abused the judge Warren Fagan. One defendant threw a bag of human excrement at a member of the jury and two others exposed their buttocks to the court. The trial jury found Johnson and two others guilty of seriously injuring Brazel with the stem of a bike seat and other weapons. Fagan sentenced them to serve an additional six years on top of their existing prison sentences. On appeal, Johnson and his co-convicted were granted a retrial, pled guilty to a lesser crime, and received a 12-month prison sentence to be served concurrently with their existing sentences. All five defendants in that trial received extra jail time for multiple counts of contempt of court.

In 2007, Johnson and an unknown accomplice stole a car while the occupants, three females – two of whom were 15 years old – were eating in a car park at a McDonald's restaurant in Doveton. With a pistol, Johnson threatened to kill the occupants if they did not get out of their car and pressed the gun to the woman's head. His accomplice punched one of the 15-year-olds twice and dragged her out of the car. Johnson and his accomplice then committed an aggravated burglary at the home of a supposed drug dealer in Craigieburn. Johnson and his accomplice broke into the house while the occupants were asleep. Johnson pointed a loaded gun at one of the occupants before the pair, who were intoxicated with drugs, realised they had robbed the wrong house. The pair stole $25,000 worth of property from the house and fled. Johnson and his accomplice were charged with and pled guilty to the offences. The sentencing judge Geoffrey Chettle called Johnson a "real menace to society" with no prospects of rehabilitation. Johnson was sentenced to a 13-year term of imprisonment. As of 2018, Johnson's criminal record listed 167 criminal convictions.

== Conyers' trial ==
In 2009, Johnson was put on trial for the murder of 18-year-old Bryan Conyers. It was alleged on 22 May 2007, Johnson and his co-accused Mark Morgan shot and killed Conyers over a A$50 drug debt at the victim's home in Berwick. It was then alleged the pair cut open Conyers' abdomen and poured petrol into the wound. Two days later, while police were searching Johnson and Morgan at Glen Iris railway station, the murder weapon, a 9 mm Luger pistol, fell out of Johnson's pants. After three months, Johnson was charged with murder, and Morgan was charged as an accessory. The jury found them both not guilty after deliberating for 27 hours.

== Murder of Carl Williams ==
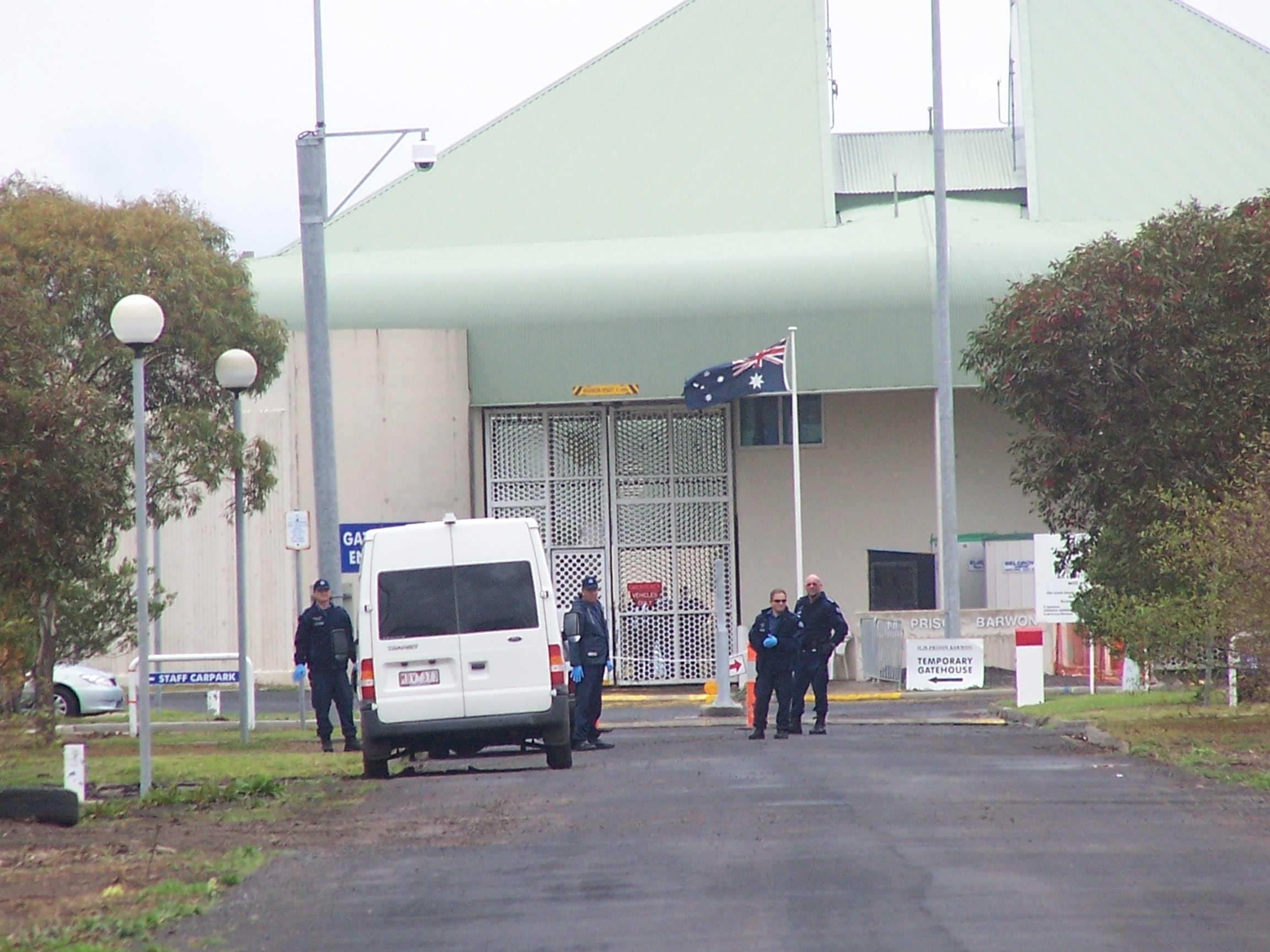
HM Prison Barwon, the location of the murder.

During his time at Barwon Prison, Johnson had formed a friendship with Carl Williams and his father George Williams. By 2010, Johnson and Williams had known each other for about 10 years. While incarcerated in Barwon, Williams was assisting Victoria Police in connection with the murders of Terrence and Christine Hodson, and had made two statements implicating himself, the former police officer Paul Dale, and hitman Rodney Collins, who was also incarcerated in Barwon.

In 2008, both Williams and Johnson had made requests to Corrections Victoria to be accommodated with one another. Many prison staff and top-level Victorian government bureaucrats had expressed concerns about Williams' safety due to Johnson's violent history and Williams' status as a police informant. On 20 January 2009, Corrections Victoria decided to accommodate Williams and Johnson together, trusting Williams' wishes and belief the pair were friends. They were placed in Unit One of the Acacia Unit, the state's highest-security prison unit. Later that year, Williams' father was released on parole and Thomas Ivanovic, a murderer and the godfather of Williams' daughter, moved into the prison unit with Williams and Johnson.

On 19 April 2010, in maximum security, Johnson murdered Carl Williams. At 12:48 pm, Johnson approached Williams from behind as he was sitting at a table reading a newspaper. Using a metal bar from the seat of an exercise bike, Johnson struck Williams on the head, causing him to fall off the chair on which he was sitting. Johnson struck Williams with the bar another seven times, then covered Williams' head with a towel, and dragged Williams' body into his cell. Prison guards did not realise Williams was dead until thirty minutes later.

=== Trial ===
In September 2011, Johnson was put on trial for the murder of Carl Williams. During the trial, Johnson said the killing was an act of self-defence and that Williams had planned to kill Johnson with a sock filled with billiard balls. The judge Lex Lasry called this claim "fanciful" and during sentencing, he found the more-likely reason for the killing was that Williams was assisting police with their case against Dale and Rodney Collins for the Hodson murders.

Lasry found Johnson showed no remorse, quoting him as saying: "What's the big deal? People die every day. What are you making a fuss about it for?" At the time of sentencing, Johnson was already serving a 16-year prison term with a 13-year non-parole period for a number of offences. With the murder taken into account, Johnson's effective new sentence was life imprisonment with a 32-year non-parole period.

== Life inside prison ==
In prison, Johnson is known by his nickname "The General". He is a leader of a gang named "Prisoners of War" and writes poetry about his time in jail.

In 2017, police investigated Johnson for issuing death threats to Williams' ex-wife Roberta Williams. It was alleged members of Prisoners of War were pressuring her to make a statement to Johnson's lawyer saying Carl Williams was planning to kill Johnson. This would have enabled Johnson to launch an appeal on the grounds his killing of Williams was an act of self-defence.

In 2021, Johnson launched an appeal against his conviction for murdering Williams based on supposed findings in the Royal Commission into the Management of Police Informants. He abandoned his appeal bid the following year. According to Herald Sun, this was because he had difficulty "obtain[ing] relevant documents from Victoria Police".

== Sources ==
- Lasry, Lex (8 December 2011). "R v Johnson [2011] VSC 633". BarNet Jade. Supreme Court of Victoria. Archived from the original on 16 March 2024.
- Brouwer, George (17 April 2012). "The death of Mr Carl Williams at HM Barwon Prison – investigation into Corrections Victoria". Victorian Ombudsman. Victorian government printer. Archived from the original on 8 April 2024.
