= Matthew Thompson =

Matthew or Matt Thompson may refer to:

== Entertainment ==
- Matthew Thompson (actor), American actor
- Matthew Thompson (writer), American-born Australian writer
- Matt Thompson (animator), American producer, writer, and voice actor in animation
- Matt Thompson (film director) (born 1984), American film director, producer, screenwriter and actor

== Sports ==
- Matthew Thompson (cricketer) (born 1974), English cricketer
- Matt Thompson (soccer) (born 1982), Australian footballer
- Matt Thompson (rugby union) (born 1982), English rugby union player

== Other ==
- Matthew William Thompson (1820–1891), British MP for Bradford, West Yorkshire, 1867–1868
- Matt Thompson (priest) (born 1968), British Anglican priest
- Matt Thompson (journalist) (born 1980), American journalist and member of the Center for Investigative Reporting

== See also ==
- Mat Roy Thompson (1874–1962), civil engineer and builder of Scotty's Castle
- Matthew Thomson (disambiguation)
