= Winlaton (disambiguation) =

Winlaton may refer to:

- Winlaton, a village in County Durham, England
- Winlaton, Victoria, a village in Victoria, Australia
- Winlaton Youth Training Centre, a youth correctional facility in Victoria, Australia
