= Victoria College, Melbourne =

College of Advanced Education in Melbourne

Victoria College was a College of Advanced Education (CAE) in Melbourne, Australia, most of which became part of Deakin University in January 1992. The Burwood, Toorak, and dual-location Rusden campuses merged with Deakin, while the Prahran campus, along with Prahran College of TAFE, were absorbed by Swinburne Institute of Technology. At its foundation in 1981, it was primarily a teachers college. At its end, it had a diverse range of courses in a broad range of subjects.

== History ==
Victoria College was created as a result of the merger on 23 December 1981 of the State College of Victoria colleges at Burwood, Rusden, and Toorak with the Prahran College of Advanced Education. In doing so, it became the largest College of Advanced Education in eastern Melbourne. For ten years, it was a large multi-campus college of advanced education, which taught a varied range of programs.

All the founding institutions had a single campus with the exception of Rusden which had two campuses: one in Clayton (known as "Rusden"), the other in Armadale.

In the beginning, it was expected by the State Government that the Prahran campus would close, with its facilities going to the TAFE college and its courses to other Victoria campuses. However, this did not occur, in part because of that campus's extensive specialist facilities.

At its founding in 1981, 75% of the college's students were enrolled in teaching courses. It diversified during its ten years, taking on many language, business and nursing course students. In 1988, only 65% of students were studying teaching. In 1991, the figure was 42%.

In 1983, the Armadale campus closed.

In 1990, the college purchased the Allambie children's home from the Victoria State Government. It was adjacent to the Burwood campus.

Research in 1990 found that the college's students mainly lived in eastern and southern Melbourne, and on the Mornington Peninsula. Students residing in the outer east found it particularly popular. It was suggested that this was due to their relative disadvantaged socio-economic backgrounds.

=== The end ===
In 1988, the Dawkins higher education reforms by the Commonwealth Government meant that just seven years after its establishment, Victoria College was to become part of a university. Which university was a matter for major debate between 1988 and 1991.

One of the rules was that all institutions on the same site were to merge. This meant that in almost all proposals, Rusden would become part of Monash University. However, the most supported of the early floated plans was a merger of all the other campuses with Swinburne Institute of Technology. A sticking point was that Swinburne required the Victoria campuses to almost completely stop teaching humanities, and focus on science and technology courses. Victoria College refused this condition in May 1989, and the deal fell apart.

After this proposal waned, a complete merger with Monash was strongly mooted and supported by the university. A Commonwealth task force in April 1989 supported this move, but with the Prahran campus transferring to TAFE and the Toorak campus closing. In 1990, State Education Minister Joan Kirner expressed that a Monash merger was what the State and Commonwealth had always wanted. However, by 1990, Monash appeared lukewarm about a merger.

At this point, the option of Deakin arose. Deakin, with its two campuses at Geelong and Warrnambool (in process), was concerned that it would become by far the smallest university in Victoria, less than half the size of the next smallest one in Swinburne. It suggested a deal with Victoria College. In July 1990, a state government report still preferred a Monash merger, but thought a Deakin deal would also be appropriate.

The final deal approved by Victoria College was to lose Rusden to Monash, and merge with Deakin. However the parliament decided instead to keep Rusden, move Prahran's Fine Arts courses to the Victorian College of the Arts, move the business and finance courses to Deakin, and give the Prahran campus to Swinburne, with the only tertiary courses, Graphics and Industrial Design, remaining on the campus, while the Furniture Studies department of Prahran TAFE moved to Holmesglen Institute in 1992.

So in the end, on 31 December 1991, the Burwood, Rusden and Toorak campuses (plus the college's corporate body) merged with Deakin University.

The Prahran campus, along with Prahran College of TAFE (co-located with the Prahran campus), were absorbed by Swinburne Institute of Technology on 1 January 1992. Six months later, this became Swinburne University of Technology.

== Campuses post merger ==
The Rusden campus, while initially part of Deakin, became part of Monash University's Clayton campus in 2004. The site now offers student accommodation. The courses at Rusden were transferred to Deakin's Burwood campus.

The Toorak campus ceased operations in 2007. Like Rusden, its courses were relocated to Deakin's Burwood campus and the property was sold to developers. In August 2007 the 1.3-hectare site, comprising the mansion, gatehouse and 3 acres (12,000 m^{2}), were conditionally sold to art dealer Rodney Menzies for about $18 million, as a private residence.

In June 2008 the remaining 1.7-hectare garden site was acquired for $45 million by Sydney-based developer and fund manager Ashington. In March 2009 the mansion's former stables, and until September 2007 Deakin University's Stonington Stables Museum of Art, were sold separately by Ashington for about $4 million. In February 2018, Rod Menzies sold the mansion for $52 million to a Chinese buyer, making it the most expensive house in the state.

== Antecedents ==
The Prahran Mechanics' Institute was established in 1854. An offshoot of this became the Prahran Technical Art School in 1915. This in turn became the Prahran Technical School in 1950 and the Prahran College of Technology in 1967. This then became the Prahran College of Advanced Education in 1974. It offered a wide range of higher education and TAFE courses (including degrees), with a focus on art and design. On 9 December 1981, the TAFE component was spun off as the Prahran College of TAFE.

The Associated Teachers Training Institute was founded in Melbourne's CBD in 1921. It moved to Mercer House in Malvern in 1946, and soon took its name (it was also known as "Mercer College"). It was a small private teachers college that trained teachers for independent schools.

Larnook Domestic Arts Teachers' College at the Larnook mansion, Armadale, was founded in 1950. It later became Larnook Teachers College, but retained the domestic arts specialisation.

In 1951, Toorak Teachers' College was established in Toorak. It moved to the Stonington mansion in Malvern in 1957. This later became the State College of Victoria at Toorak. This institution focused on primary teaching.

The Training Centre for Teachers of the Deaf was based in Kew. It was opened in 1952.

The Glendonald School for Deaf Children was a school for the deaf in Kew. One of its functions was to train teachers for the deaf. This aspect was known as Glendonald Teachers College, and was established in 1954.

Burwood Teachers College began at the Box Hill Methodist Church in 1954 while waiting for its buildings to be ready. It moved to the current Burwood campus site in late 1954.

Monash Teachers' College was a secondary teachers' college on the Rusden campus site in Clayton, founded in 1961. It was founded because Monash University's initial enrolment for teaching was greater than its facilities could support, and establishing a separate college on an adjacent site was more cost effective for the state government than enlarging facilities at the university.

The constituent colleges of the State College of Victoria were formed on 31 July 1973. The Larnook and Monash colleges merged to become the two-campus State College of Victoria at Rusden. Glendonald joined in 1975.

In 1975, Mercer House joined SCV Toorak.

The State College of Victoria at Burwood was formed in 1976 by the merger of Burwood Teachers College with two deaf-serving teachers colleges (Training Centre for Teachers of the Deaf, and the ex-Glendonald component of Rusden). The result was mainly a primary teaching college, with a special unit for disabled student teaching.

== Archive ==
The most extensive archive of records of Victoria College and its predecessors (Burwood, Toorak, Rusden and Prahran) is collected on the site of the former Allambie Reception Centre, adjacent to the Burwood campus of Deakin University, while some are held in the Public Records Office of Victoria.
