= 1933 Flinders by-election =

Australian federal by-election

11 November 1933
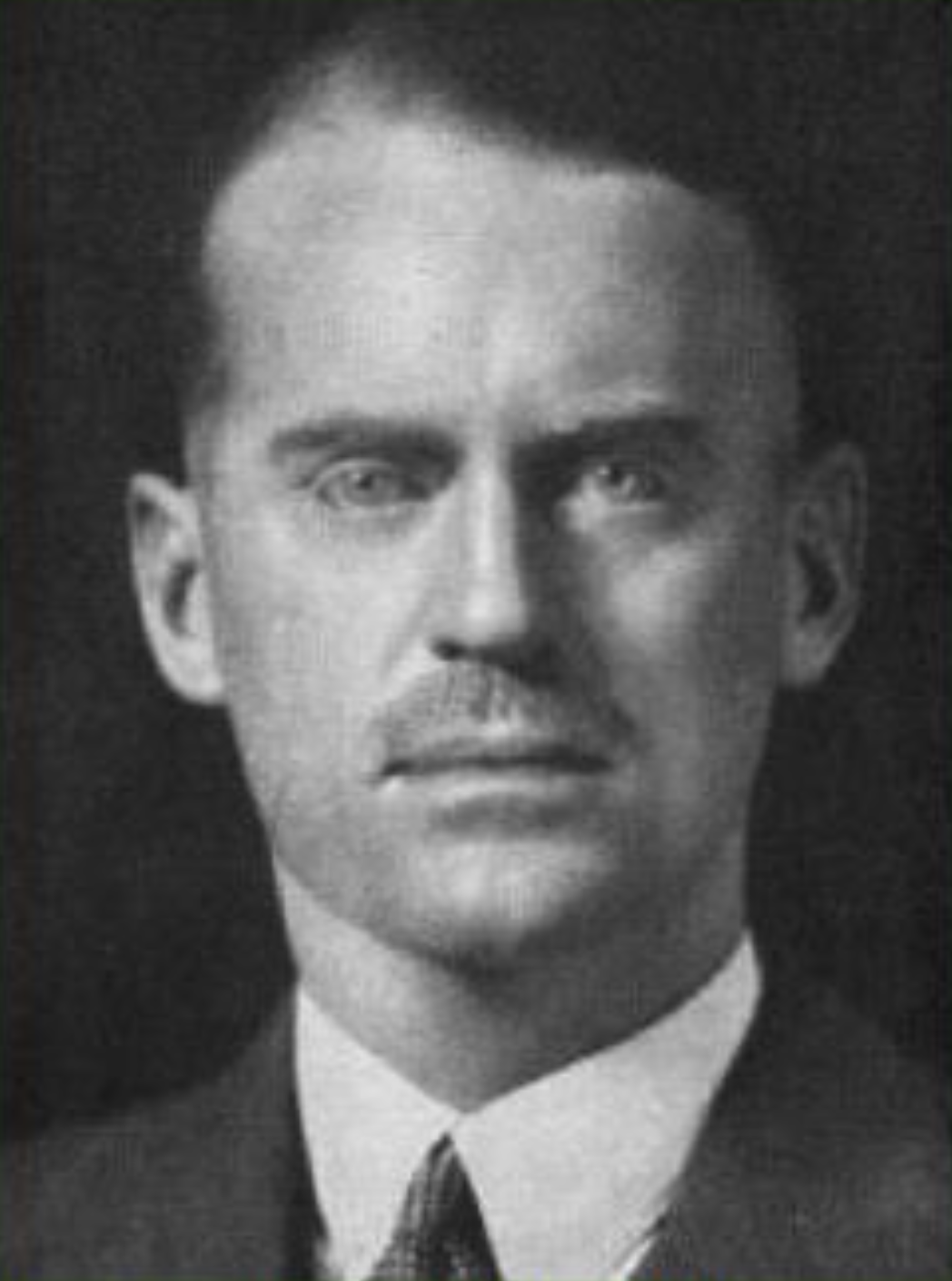
	First party	Second party
		ALP
Candidate	James Fairbairn	Arthur Haywood
Party	United Australia	Labor
Popular vote	36,773	22,454
Percentage	59.0%	36.0%
Swing	▼9.3pp	▲4.3pp
TPP	59.5%	40.5%
TPP swing	▼8.8pp	▲8.8pp
MP before election
Stanley Bruce
United Australia
Elected MP
James Fairbairn
United Australia

A by-election was held for the Australian House of Representatives seat of Flinders on 11 November 1933. This was triggered by the resignation of United Australia Party (UAP) MP and former Prime Minister Stanley Bruce to become Australian High Commissioner to the United Kingdom.

The by-election was won by UAP candidate James Fairbairn.

== Results ==
Flinders by-election, 1933
Party	Candidate	Votes	%	±%
United Australia	James Fairbairn	36,773	59.0	−9.3
Labor	Arthur Haywood	22,454	36.0	+4.3
Communist	Ralph Gibson	3,124	5.0	+5.0
Total formal votes		62,351	97.3	
Informal votes		1,747	2.7	
Turnout		64,098	89.2	
Two-party-preferred result
United Australia	James Fairbairn		59.5	−8.8
Labor	Arthur Haywood		40.5	+8.8
United Australia hold		Swing	−8.8	
