= Pirra Homestead =

Homestead in Victoria, Australia

Coordinates: 38.0094°S 144.4105°E

- Pirra Homestead, 1970
- Interactive map of Pirra Homestead
- Location: Lara, Victoria
- Capacity: Children's Homes Section, Family Welfare Division, Social Welfare Department
- Closed: 1983

Pirra Homestead, in Windermere Road, Lara, Victoria, was built in the mid-1860s by George Fairbairn, one of Australia's most prosperous pastoralists and a pioneer of Australia's frozen meat export trade, who established the property as a premier sheep stud. The homestead was originally called 'Woodlands', but by 1880 the name of the property had changed to 'Windermere'.

In the first decade of the twentieth century, the property was sold to the Victorian Government for closer settlement, but the homestead and 637 acres (258 hectares) were taken over by the Lara Inebriates' Institution. After the Inebriates' Institution closed in 1930, the property was sold to James McDonald in 1938, who turned it into a mixed farm. In 1946, he leased the former Inebriates' dormitory building to the States Tobacco Company.

After the Tobacco Company folded in 1948, the property was sold to Oscar and Edna Mendelsohn. The Tobacco Company workers were employed by the clothing manufacturer Pelaco, which operated a factory in the former Inebriates' dormitory. The Mendelsohns renamed the property 'Serendip' and established a commercial almond orchard. The water reservoir was proclaimed a sanctuary for the protection of the local bird life. Oscar Mendelsohn was also appointed as an assistant inspector of the government Fisheries and Game Department. In 1959, the Mendelsohns sold to the Department of Fisheries and Wildlife who assumed control of the 600 acres (240 hectares) surrounding the wildlife sanctuary.

The immediate homestead, reduced to 37 acres (15 hectares), was taken over by the Victorian Government Social Welfare Department, and the two-storey mansion house and nearby buildings became the Pirra Girls' Home in 1961. 'Pirra' is an aboriginal word for moon, being a symbol of happiness. Pirra accommodated female wards of the state aged from 10 – 14 years who had come under State wardship for being "in moral danger" or for "lapsing or (being) likely to lapse into a life of vice and crime".

The Girls' Home closed in 1983 and Pirra was leased to Rex Keogh and Geoff Dombrain. It became an accommodation and community establishment for the lessees and invited artists. In 1996, the property, then reduced to 6.665 hectares (16.469 acres), was sold to Rex Keogh, who continued running it as a home for artists, and as community‐based accommodation for a limited number of disabled persons. In 2006 the property was sold to the Bisinella family who undertook a $2 million+ restoration of the homestead.

== See also ==
- HM Prison Barwon
- HM Prison Geelong
- Marngoneet Correctional Centre
