= Francesco Mangione =

Australian murderer

- Born: 23 July 1957 (age 69); Sicily, Italy
- Occupations: Electrical apprentice; Ice cream van operator
- Conviction: Murder
- Penalty: 22 years' imprisonment, 18 years' non-parole period

Francesco Mangione is an Italian-born Australian, convicted of the 2002 murder of his 26-year-old cousin, Denis Giunta, in his Williamstown home.

== Early life ==
Mangione, of Moonee Ponds, Victoria was born 23 July 1957 in Sicily. In 1969 he came to Australia. Apprenticed to the former State Electricity Commission of Victoria, he was in 1978 named by the Industrial Training Commission of Victoria as the outstanding radio tradesman apprentice of that year. He departed the SECV in 1989 and began operating an ice cream van. In 1992 Mangione was arrested and detained, but he was later released due to there being no evidence to support charges over a missing six-year-old girl found in his ice cream van. In 1993 an incident occurred between his family and that of Giunta, also an ice cream van operator, escalating a turf war which included a violent fight between Mangione and Giunta.

== Criminal history ==
On 5 February 2002 Giunta returned home from work. After showering he stepped naked into the bedroom where his wife lay sleeping and Mangione lay in wait. Mangione then attacked Giunta slashing, stabbing, and hacking at him with a homemade sword. Giunta's wife, Laura, awakened by her husband's screams, escaped via the bedroom's balcony leading to the outside garage roof where she leaped to the ground, breaking her leg, requiring further hospitalization for 21 days and in need of a wheelchair and crutches upon her release. Giunta died at the scene from massive injuries. Mangione fled the scene dropping the weapon as he did. His DNA was later found on the handle of the sword and tools were found in his home which were forensically linked to the making of the weapon.

=== Trial ===
The trial lasted for ten days. On 13 February 2004 Mangione was found guilty by a jury. He was sentenced by Judge David Harper to 22 years imprisonment, with a non-parole period of 18 years. On 21 February 2006 the Supreme Court of Victoria Court of Appeal dismissed Mangione's appeal against the severity of his sentence. Mangione continues to maintain his innocence. In 2010 it was reported that Mangione was imprisoned in Barwon Prison.
