= Lyndale Secondary College =

Location
- Gladstone Road, Dandenong North; Melbourne, Victoria; Australia; 37.9574°S 145.2063°E

Information
- Type: State school
- Motto: Strength, Pride, Success
- Established: 1961
- Principal: Pam Robinson
- Teaching staff: 110
- Years: 7 to 12
- Enrollment: 1253
- Colours: Maroon, yellow
- Yearbook: MENSANA
- Website: www.lyndale.vic.edu.au

Lyndale Secondary College is a co-educational government secondary school located in Dandenong North, Victoria, Australia. It has a student enrolment of approximately 1,200, and is known as one of the largest single campus schools in Victoria.

The school is divided into two sub-schools—a middle school and a senior school. Its principal is Pam Robinson, and there are also three vice principals.

The principal features of the campus are the Hugh McRae Hall, a Resource Centre (Library), a Senior Studies Wing, a Language Centre (West Wing), the well-equipped Graeme Fox Stadium, a STEM Centre, and recently completed Performing Arts centre.

== Headstart Program ==
The Headstart Program is a new initiative that the college has launched where students from Year 7 to 11 commence the new school year late in November (25 November in 2013). The program lasts for 3 weeks with studies resulting in an assessment task/outcome.

A feature of the school is the SEAL (Select Entry Accelerated Learning) program.

The highest ATAR score of Lyndale Secondary College was achieved by Jin (Sam) Shan in 2011, with an ATAR of 99.15.

== Notable former students ==
- Adam Collins, cricket journalist
- John Farnham, singer
- Cassandra Fernando, member of the Australian Parliament for Holt
- James Gwilt, AFL player for St Kilda and Essendon
- Hu Heming, table tennis player and Olympian
- Jack Hingert, soccer player for Brisbane Roar FC and the Sri Lanka national football team
- Harvey James, rock guitarist
- Matthew Charles Johnson, convicted murderer, expelled in year 7
- Toby McLean, AFL player for the Western Bulldogs
