= Matthew Thomson =

Matthew Thomson may refer to:

- Matthew Thomson (sport shooter)
- Matthew Thomson (tennis)
- Matthew Sydney Thomson, British dermatologist

== See also ==
- Matthew Thompson (disambiguation)
