= Marngoneet Correctional Centre =

Medium security prison in Victoria, Australia

- Interactive map of Marngoneet Correctional Centre
- Location: Lara, Victoria, Australia; 37°58′55″S 144°21′7″E
- Status: Operational
- Security class: Medium security
- Capacity: 559
- Opened: 3 March 2006 (20 years ago)
- Managed by: Corrections Victoria
- Website: Official website

Marngoneet Correctional Centre is a 559-bed medium security Australian prison in Lara, Victoria, Australia, located adjacent to maximum security HM Prison Barwon. Marngoneet Correctional Centre officially opened on 3 March 2006.

The Marngoneet Correctional Centre is designed to reduce offenders chance of re-offending offering a number of rehabilitation programs including:

- Sex Offender Treatment Programs;
- Violent Offender Treatment Programs;
- Drug and Alcohol Treatment Programs.

The Marngoneet Correctional Centre also offers vocational services that increase the chance of prisoners employment upon release including:

- TAFE accredited training;
- A Good Lives Reintegration Service that coordinates a range of programs, including those that relate to release preparation, personal development and recreation programs;
- Education service targeting employment preparation and general and adult basic education.

== See also ==
- HM Prison Geelong
- Pirra Homestead
