= Ilya Nikkolai =

- Born: 25 September 1939 (age 86); Kyiv, Ukraine
- Education: Early Auto-CAD developer, largely self taught
- Known for: Visual music

Ilya Nikkolai (born 25 September 1939) is an Australian visual music artist and architectural designer. Nikkolai is known for what he calls "Liquid Music," which has been broadcast in Australia (Channel 31 (Australia), in Melbourne and Perth, and CTV Perth) and America (Harmony Channel) as well as on Floating Worlds.

== Liquid Music ==
Liquid Music is a form of visual music which Ilya Nikkolai began developing in 1992. It is characterized by flowing, organic shapes and patterns and involves simultaneously occurring layers of music.

Ilya has said of Liquid Music that he feels

"...as if I have landed on a new and unexplored Continent full of exciting possibilities. The Continent is within. The language is not of The Word and Ideas and Beliefs, but that of Light, Colour and the Eternal Movement of Creation."
