= Winlaton Youth Training Centre =

Winlanton correction & training centre

Coordinates: 37°49′18″S 145°10′29″E

- Interactive map of Winlaton Youth Training Centre
- Location: Victoria
- Status: Closed
- Security class: Remand to Maximum Security
- Capacity: 45 - Actual 100 +
- Opened: 1956
- Closed: 1993
- Managed by: Youth Welfare Division, Social Welfare Department Victoria (later Community Services Victoria)

Winlaton Youth Training Centre was a Government owned and run female youth correctional facility located on 18 acres (73,000 m^{2}) at 186 Springvale Road Nunawading, Victoria, Australia. The facility was designed to accommodate 14- to 18-year-old wards of the state. It opened in 1956 as the Winlaton Juvenile School, and closed in 1993 as the Nunawading Youth Residential Facility. A housing estate (Candlebark Estate) now occupies the site.

== History ==
The centre was established in 1956 on land purchased from the Health Department. The name, "Winlaton" came from the English town where the land's previous owner Mr Tweddle had been born. The Health Department had intended the site as a venereal disease clinic but sold it to the then Department of Reformatory School for Boys and Girls.

The opening of Winlaton signalled the end to accommodating young women in the overcrowded "Turana" Youth Training Centre in Parkville, Victoria which, in 1956 accommodated children of both sexes from infancy to aged 18. Winlaton was intended as a maximum security centre for young women under sentence (i.e. those who had been committed to the care of the state for criminal offences). As such Winlaton was built to accommodate 45 inmates in private rooms in three residential sections.

== Internal organisation ==
There were three sections: Karingal also known as Kooringal (low security), Warrina (medium security) and Goonyah (maximum security). Winbirra Remand centre was opened on the site in 1960 and acted as the remand facility for female juvenile offenders and young girls awaiting court appearances in Victoria. A hostel, Leawarra, was opened in December 1959 to provide accommodation for inmates who were close to release and were attending outside schools or employment. Leawarra was actually the original farmhouse which had been left on the site when the government purchased it from Mr Tweddle. Coincidentally, the address of Winlaton Youth Training centre was 186 Springvale Road whereas the address for both Leawarra and Winbirra was 208 Springvale Road. The three institutions were run as separate facilities but came under the supervision of the one superintendent. Many former inmates recall their time in Winbirra as time in Winlaton. However, pretty much every female state ward in Victoria spent time in Winbirra between 1960 and the 1970s whether or not they were then committed to Winlaton

== Administration ==
There was a special school on site which was administered and staffed by the Department of Education and was not under the control of the Winlaton superintendent. During the 1950s and 1960s, many State wards had been taken into care because of truancy; attending school which was compulsory until the age of 15 at the time. However, once in care, children were commonly denied access to education. For example, at one point in the late 1960s, despite the population of Winbirra Remand Centre reaching about 40, the school took only eight girls for classes. The centre had a permanent medical nurse on staff but called in doctors from outside to treat illness.

For most of the centre's history the superintendent was female as was the majority of the staff. From the 1980s onwards, the superintendents of Winlaton were referred to as 'managers' and the residents as 'students'.

Due to changes in child welfare legislation and, fundamentally, moral and control panics about juvenile delinquency in the 1950s and 1960s, the number of girls increased throughout the 1950s and 1960s. However, the suitability of new inmates for a maximum security facility declined. Increasingly, the young women and girls sent to Winlaton had been detained not for criminal offences but had been made wards of the state under the Children's Welfare Act for either being "exposed to moral danger" or "likely to lapse into a life of vice or crime". Young women who had been made wards of the state to protect them from abuse at home soon found themselves living in overcrowded facilities with young women under sentence from the courts.

Winlaton did not exist in a vacuum, nor was it the first attempt by the Victorian government to address the needs of young people and the community. Winlaton represented a new chapter in the larger history of Victorian welfare. Of particular significance are the decades immediately preceding the opening of Winlaton. Changes to legislation, accommodation facilities and approaches to juvenile care and juvenile justice which occurred in the 1950s set the scene for the opening of Winlaton and defined the parameters within which Winlaton functioned.

== Changes in legislation ==
In 1954, the Children's Welfare Department and the Department for Reformatory Schools acted under the jurisdiction of several Acts of Parliament including the Children's Welfare Act 1928 (Vic), the Crimes Act 1928 (Vic), a section of the Children's Welfare Act 1933 (Vic), and parts of the Maintenance (Widowed Mothers) Acts 1937 and 1941 (Vic). In 1954 the relevance of these Acts to welfare were altered with the ascension of the Children's Welfare Act 1954 (Vic) which coincided with a change of name to the Children's Welfare Department (CWD). This legislation remained largely unchanged until 1960 when the Social Welfare Act 1960 (Vic) was passed.

By 1956, the Government of Victoria had accepted the need for institutional change spurred on by earlier legislative amendments and broader definitions of those children who could be taken into care and made wards of the state. Institutional change was necessary insofar as newer institutions were required to accommodate the increasing number of children taken into care under the new legislation. The state also took on the task of providing care for those for whom private and church accommodation was unavailable due to overcrowding or unsuitability. Meanwhile, new developments in theories of caring for and reforming delinquent youth led to a reappraisal of current institutional methods. By the 1950s the emphasis in reforming delinquents had moved from the eugenic and environmental to the educational, therefore creating a greater emphasis on education and methods by which the school system could prevent delinquency while juvenile justice systems incorporated school lessons and activities as part of their rehabilitation programmes. Education was identified as the best possible means by which to address and minimise delinquent behaviour.

== Redundancy ==
When it was founded in 1956, Winlaton was promoted as a solution to female juvenile delinquency of all kinds: criminality, sexual promiscuity, homelessness or parental neglect. By the 1970s and 1980s, Winlaton, like other congregate institutions, was becoming peripheral to the philosophy of juvenile justice and welfare in Victoria; it became an anachronism. By the 1990s Winlaton was redundant and irrelevant to a new era of government policy compared with its pre-eminence in the 1950s when it was central to the then policies of institutionalised reform and protection of youth. At worst, it was seen as part of the problem of female juvenile justice in Victoria and protection rather than as the solution it was meant to be.

Given its primary function as a maximum security facility for youth offenders Winlaton was, by all accounts from former residents, a harsh place and, in keeping with the thinking of the day, was unmistakably institutional. Throughout its history experimental programmes were introduced. These ranged from the very fact that a specialist education based maximum security facility was in itself experimental in the 1950s to radical "triad" therapy in the 1980s. The Triad therapy was based on the theory of having a person with the problem, a person who had had the problem and a person that had never had the problem. Other programs included tattoo removal, and controversial usage of the contraceptive drug Depo-Provera on girls as young as 13 in the 1970s and 1980s, at a time when the drug was supposed to be restricted to research and development.

In the late 1980s-early 1990s the centre was renamed the "Nunawading Youth Residential Facility" and began accommodating boys aged 10 to 14 years.

The centre closed in 1993. Former residents have few formal avenues for recognition and there are no commercially published histories of the centre.
