= Ian Fairbairn (rower) =

British rower and financier (1896–1968)

- Born: Stephen Ian Fairbairn; 14 April 1896; Melbourne, Australia
- Died: 5 December 1968 (aged 72); Chelsea, London, Great Britain
- Organization: Thames Rowing Club
- Known for: Rowing
- Spouse: Cynthia Isabelle Theresa Arbuthnot (divorced 1941)
- Children: 2
- Relatives: Steve Fairbairn (father); Gerald Arbuthnot (father-in-law)

Stephen Ian Fairbairn (14 April 1896 – 5 December 1968) was a British financier and rower who competed in the 1924 Summer Olympics, and later rose to the position of chairman of the M&G fund management company.

== Personal life ==
Fairbairn was the son of Steve Fairbairn and his wife Eleanor née Sharwood. He went to school at Eton.

Fairbairn married Cynthia Isabelle Theresa Arbuthnot, daughter of Gerald Arbuthnot, MP for Burnley on 27 July 1925. They had two children and were divorced in 1941. He was married a second time in 1941, to Esmée V. H. Bethell (also known as Esmée Stobart from her earlier marriage, from which she had two sons). She was killed in an air-raid by a flying bomb in 1944.

In 1961 he created the Esmée Fairbairn Foundation as a memorial to his second wife, transferring his personal holding in M&G Group plc to the trust. This endowment allowed it to become one of the larger charities in the UK.

== Career ==
=== Military ===
After leaving school, Fairbairn attended Royal Military College Sandhurst, and was commissioned as a second lieutenant in the Royal Horse Guards on 11 November 1914. He was posted to France on 19 May 1915, having just been promoted to lieutenant on 14 May. He transferred to the Guards Machine Gun Regiment on 12 August 1918, and was promoted captain on 18 October 1918. He ceased to be employed with the Guards Machine Gun Regiment on 31 January 1919, and resigned his commission on 1 May 1919. He was badly wounded during the war.

Fairbairn appears to have held a reserve commission during the Second World War.

=== Rowing ===
He was a member of Thames Rowing Club, as was his father, taking part in a race on the Thames at Putney on 12 April 1919. In 1920 he was runner up in Silver Goblets at Henley Royal Regatta in a coxless pair with Bruce Logan. In 1923 Fairbairn stroked the Thames crew which won the Grand Challenge Cup, and was again stroke in the Thames crew that made up the eight rowing for Great Britain at the 1924 Summer Olympics, finishing fourth. He was Captain of Thames (again following his father) in 1933, a vice president from 1927 to 1967 and President from 1967 until his death a year later. He was a Steward of Henley Royal Regatta from 1948 until his death.

=== Finance ===
After the First World War, Fairbairn worked at the London Stock Exchange and in Paris for several years. He also studied at the London School of Economics. He pioneered the unit trust industry at M&G Investments which he joined in 1935 as an investment manager. From 1943 he was chair of M&G. He believed that investments in equities should be available to everyone so that there was a wider ownership of stakes in the nation's economy. In 1955 he became chair of the parent group, White Drummond. He resigned as chair of both organisations in 1967.

=== Politics ===
Fairbairn was the Unionist candidate for Burnley (his first father-in-law's old constituency) in the 1924 and 1929 general elections; on both occasions he came second behind Labour's Arthur Henderson.
