= HM Prison Barwon =

Maximum security prison in Lara, Victoria, Australia

Barwon Prison
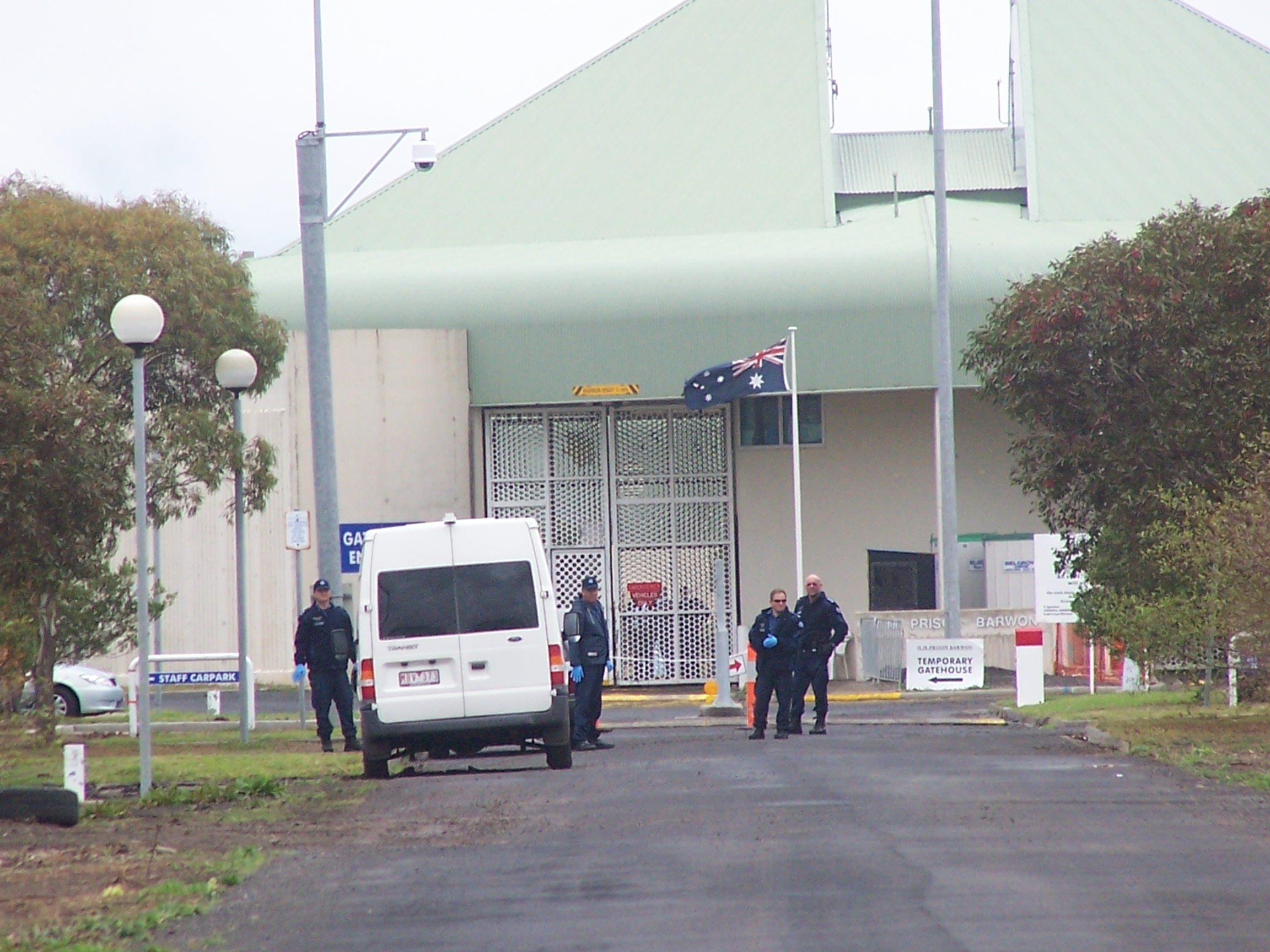
- Interactive map of Barwon Prison
- Location: Lara, Victoria, Australia; 37°59′5″S 144°21′9″E
- Status: Operational
- Security class: Maximum
- Capacity: 478
- Opened: January 1990 (36 years ago)
- Managed by: Corrections Victoria
- Website: Official website

HM Prison Barwon or informally Barwon Prison, an Australian high risk and maximum security prison for males, is located 6 kilometres (3.7 mi) from the township of Lara, near Geelong, Victoria, Australia. The facility is operated by Corrections Victoria. The prison provides accommodation and services for remand and sentenced prisoners detained under Victorian and Federal legislation.

Barwon Prison is located adjacent to the 559-bed medium security Marngoneet Correctional Centre, opened in 2006.

== History ==
Barwon was built to cater for demand due to the upcoming closures of HM Prison Geelong in 1991 and HM Prison Pentridge in 1997.

Construction of the prison commenced in 1986. The works were carried out by Thiess Contractors. It was completed in October 1989 and the first prisoners were received in January 1990.

== Accommodation units ==
Barwon provides accommodation and services for maximum security mainstream prisoners including a 20-bed facility for high security prisoners and a 60-bed facility for maximum security protection prisoners. A campus of the Box Hill Institute of TAFE operates at the prison providing a corrections education program.

The prison is split into many separate units including:

- Acacia – a high security management unit that is used to accommodate high risk prisoners. This unit can hold up to 24 prisoners in 4 separate areas, and is the oldest management unit within the prison.
- Banksia – a management unit for prisoners requiring close supervision or protection. All cells in this unit are single cells.
- Hoya – a protection unit which houses prisoners who, due to the nature of their crimes, are considered as at risk being housed alongside mainstream prisoners. Initially built as a demountable structure, this unit has remained as a permanent structure and is separated from all the other units.
- Cassia – a mainstream unit which is classed as the reception unit for mainstream prisoners. This unit features both single and double cells and can house up to 80 prisoners.
- Diosma – a mainstream unit which is seen as a first stop after Cassia, and houses prisoners who don't have lengthy sentences.
- Eucalypt – a mainstream unit used to house older, more settled long term prisoners.
- Grevillea – opened in April 2003, housing segregation prisoners. This unit housed protection prisoners until mid 2015, when its prisoners were transferred to make way for the incoming prisoners involved in the Metropolitan Remand Centre Riots. In early 2016 it was classified as a restricted regime unit, a stepping stone for prisoners transitioning out of high security units into mainstream units. In late 2016 it was again reclassified as a youth justice centre, to house 16 and 17 year olds after the loss of half of the Melbourne Youth Justice Precinct at Parkville.
- Illawarra – was initially a mainstream unit for prisoners classified as Medium Security. Since 2016 has been used as a remand unit, housing prisoners yet to be convicted or sentenced, and as such offering more incentives such as longer let out hours and facilities. This unit is also a demountable building that has remained permanent and has the ability to be separated from the mainstream units because it is internally fenced and gated.
- Melaleuca – a high security unit that is used to accommodate high risk prisoners. This unit was opened in 2007 and can accommodate 24 prisoners in single cells, separated into 4 different areas.
- Olearia – the newest High Security unit at the prison, officially opened on 10 August 2016 and accepting prisoners from 22 August 2016. The 36 million dollar expansion is officially a prison within a prison, separated from the rest of Barwon and housing its own visits centre and medical wing. The maximum security unit can hold up to 40 prisoners in single cells, including 20 that have their own small exercise yards for prisoners who cannot mix with others.

== Notable prisoners ==
- Pasquale Barbaro – convicted drug dealer
- Abdul Nacer Benbrika – convicted terrorist
- Christopher 'Badness' Binse – convicted armed robber who has spent the majority of his life in custody
- Gregory Brazel – convicted serial killer, sentenced to triple life imprisonment
- Leslie Camilleri – convicted serial killer, sentenced to life imprisonment
- Mario Condello – convicted drug trafficker and underworld figure; subsequently released and murdered
- Ashley Coulston – convicted triple murderer
- Bandali Debs – convicted serial killer
- Paul Denyer – convicted serial killer
- Peter Dupas – convicted multiple murderer and rapist
- Keith Faure – convicted murderer
- Domenic Gatto – a Melbourne businessman, detailed under bail and acquitted of all charges
- Evangelos Goussis – convicted murderer
- Matthew Charles Johnson – self-titled 'general' of prison gang, Prisoners of War; murdered Carl Williams in Barwon
- Brian Keith Jones – convicted of the abduction and sexual assault of six children (released; later jailed indefinitely for breaches of parole)
- Julian Knight – convicted of the 1987 Hoddle Street massacre
- Peter James Knight – convicted murderer and anti-abortion activist
- Francesco Mangione – convicted murderer in Mr Whippy turf war
- Craig Minogue – the Russell Street bomber
- Tony Mokbel – Melbourne underworld figure
- George Pell – convicted child sex offender until his conviction was quashed on 7 April 2020
- Hugo Rich – convicted of armed robbery and murder
- John Sharpe – convicted of the 2004 double spear gun murders of his wife and child
- Matthew Wales – convicted of the 2002 Society Murders in Glen Iris
- Carl Williams – convicted murderer, drug dealer and manufacturer; murdered in custody at Barwon

== See also ==
- List of prisons in Victoria
