= Allambie Reception Centre =

Centre for children in state care in Victoria, Australia 1961 to 1990

Coordinates: 37°50′55.80″S 145°6′52.68″E

- Interactive map of Allambie Reception Centre
- Location: Burwood, Victoria
- Status: Closed
- Capacity: 100 (at peak)
- Opened: 1961
- Closed: June 1990 r
- Managed by: Family Welfare Division, Social Welfare Department, later Community Services Victoria

Allambie Reception Centre was a former reception, treatment, classification and transit centre for children admitted to the care of the Victorian Government in Australia. The centre operated between 1961 and 1990 and was initially managed by the Family Welfare Division of the Social Welfare Department, later the Department of Community Welfare Services and Community Services Victoria. Located at 70 Elgar Road, Burwood, Victoria, the centre was designed to accommodate up to 100 children following a breakdown in home release, foster care or a children's home placement.

== History and facilities ==
Initially called Kildonan and managed by the Presbyterian Church, the Victorian Government purchased the institution in 1960 and managed it under the agency of the Family Welfare Division of the Social Welfare Department. The Department had responsibility for young people under two separate divisions; the Youth Welfare Division (children aged 14 to 18 years and juvenile offenders) and the Family Welfare Division (children aged 0–14 years). Opened with 90 beds for children of both sexes, Allambie was expanded to accommodate babies and toddlers when the nursery was opened in 1964. Prior to its opening, children had been housed at Turana Youth Training Centre in Parkville. The move to Allambie meant that young children of both sexes could be accommodated together.

The Education Department operated a school in the grounds of Allambie, although some children attended schools in the community.

By the mid-1970s the number of children placed at Allambie reached an all-time high. Overcrowding decreased as alternative reception and care programs were implemented by the Department. During the 1970s, changes in the structure of state-run facilities, including regionalisation of services, reduced the need for large-scale centralised reception centre like Allambie. By the early 1980s, Allambie accommodated about 100 children. A review in 1985 recommended the closure of Allambie, and the redirection of funding to regional reception centres. The nursery at Allambie closed in 1986. Allambie Reception Centre closed in June 1990.

Adjacent to Allambie was the Orana children's home, which was a private children's home run along a cottage system under the ownership and management of the Methodist Church.

== Current use ==
The old Allambie site is now part of the Burwood campus of Deakin University.
