= Steve Fairbairn =

British-Australian rower and coach

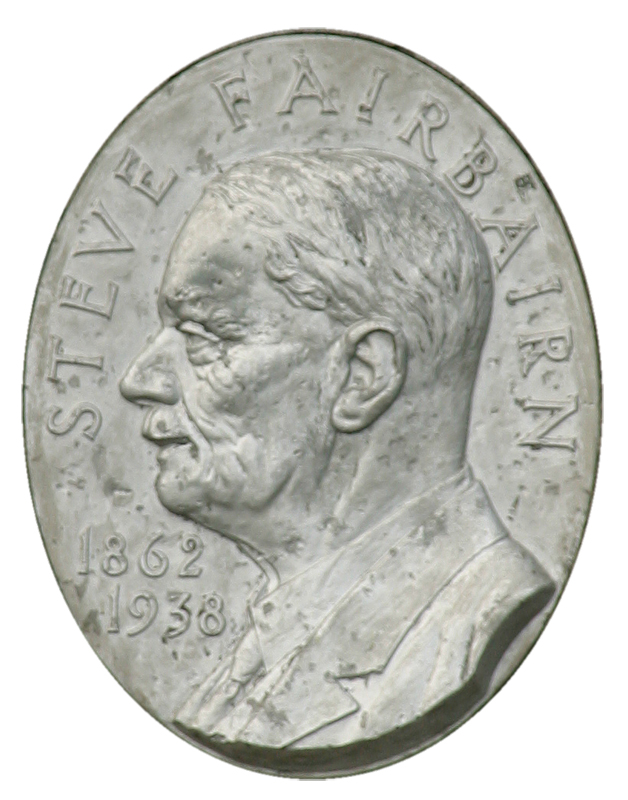
- Steve Fairbairn memorial bust on the Mile Post

Personal information
- Full name: Stephen Fairbairn
- Nationality: British
- Born: 31 July 1862 Geelong, Victoria, Australia
- Died: 16 May 1938 (aged 75) London, England

Sport
- Sport: Rowing
- Club: Jesus College Boat Club; Cambridge University Boat Club; Thames Rowing Club

Stephen Fairbairn (25 August 1862 – 16 May 1938) was a rower and an influential rowing coach at Jesus College Boat Club, Cambridge University, Thames Rowing Club and London Rowing Club in the early decades of the 20th century, and founded the prestigious Head of the River Race in 1925.

== Early life ==
Fairbairn was born on 25 August 1862 in Toorak, Victoria. He was the son of Virginia (née Armytage) and George Fairbairn. His father, born in Scotland, was a wealthy grazier with significant pastoral holdings and married the daughter of his business partner George Armytage.

Fairbairn was educated at Wesley College, Melbourne, and Geelong Grammar School, where he took up rowing and was regarded a good Australian rules footballer and cricketer. He topped his leaving year in mathematics and was a senior school prefect.

Five of Fairbairn's brothers, including future Australian MP George, had attended Jesus College, Cambridge, and Steve followed them to read Law from 1882.

== Rowing career ==
Fairbairn rowed for Jesus College Boat Club, like his brothers and six of his cousins had done. In Jesus College crews, he rowed to success in the Cambridge University bumps races and Henley Royal Regatta, where they won the 1885 Grand Challenge Cup. He also won the hammer throwing and putting the weight at the Freshmen's sports for Jesus College. He rowed for Cambridge in the Boat Race, in 1882 and 1883 and later while conducting post-graduate studies in 1886 and 1887.

After university Fairbairn's senior club rowing was from the Thames Rowing Club in London.

== Coaching career ==
=== Philosophy ===
Fairbairn was an early proponent of training his crews to slide in their seats to facilitate leg-drive. He had realised that the secret to world-champion sculler Ned Hanlan's uncanny successes was not that he rowed a longer stroke, but rather that he used his legs to great effect during the stroke. He was also an advocate of fitting longer slides into boats to better allow the use of the legs. Fairbairn's observations led him to develop a revolutionary rowing style featuring concurrent use of the legs, back and arms at the catch.

He also coached that crews should not focus unduly on positioning their bodies according to rigid rules but should instead concentrate on the movement of the blade, creating an easy, flowing movement. His philosophy was that rowing, when done well, should be a sublimely enjoyable experience.

All of these features of his coaching are referred to as "Fairbairnism". There is continuing debate among rowing coaches and historians as to whether Fairbairnism better describes a style of rowing or philosophy of coaching.

=== Influence ===
Fairbairn was an iconoclast with strong views and great charisma. Opinions of him and his methods tended to be extreme. Fairbairn corresponded widely and wrote four volumes on coaching, and his views were therefore adopted by many coaches across the globe. In the 1920s and 1930s, many coaches followed his lead completely. However, others felt Fairbairnism to be anathema to the principles of the "English Orthodox" style. To those observers, Fairbairn's crews rowed sloppily. The schism between "Orthodoxy" and "Fairbairnism" had largely disappeared from rowing by the 1940s. Fairbairn's books were collected, and reprinted in 1951 and again in 1990.

=== Training methodology ===
Fairbairn was a strong believer in the benefits of distance training; part of his philosophy was that "mileage makes champions". As such he developed the concept of the head race, a long-distance race against the clock to mark the end of winter training, thus encouraging crews to train over longer distances.

In 1926 he founded the Head of the River Race, for men's eights held annually since on The Championship Course on the River Thames in London. Similarly he donated a trophy for a head race to be held annually on the River Cam. "The Fairbairn Cup" (known colloquially as "Fairbairns") is the annual race held on the first Thursday and Friday after the end of the University of Cambridge's Michaelmas Full Term (typically early in December). The race is organised by Jesus College Boat Club in Cambridge.

== Memorial ==
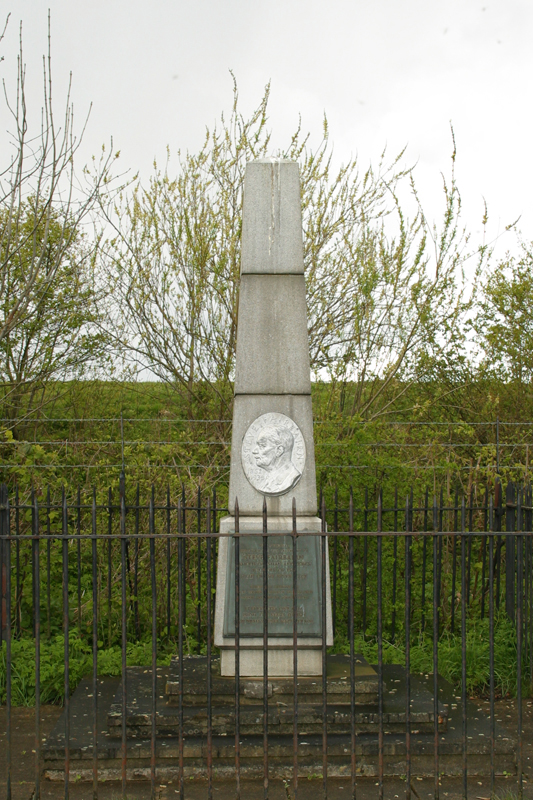
Mile Post commemorating Steve Fairbairn on the Championship Course

Fairbairn died in London, 16 May 1938. His ashes rest beneath the shadow of Jesus College chapel. A portrait by James Quinn hangs in the college. A duplicate of the Quinn portrait hangs in Thames Rowing Club's Putney clubhouse.

A memorial to Fairbairn is situated on the southern bank of the Thames between Putney and Hammersmith. This memorial, a stone obelisk popularly known as the Mile Post, is exactly one mile from the Putney end of the Championship Course. In the Boat Race and Wingfield Sculls, the Mile Post is a formal intermediate timing point, and it marks one mile from the finish of the Head of the River Race.

A bronze bust of Fairbairn by George Drinkwater is the winner's trophy for the Head of the River Race. In 2010 Fairbairn was inducted into the Rowing Victoria Hall of Fame.

== Personal life ==
Fairbairn married Eleanor Sharwood daughter of Sydney Sharwood, on 18 November 1891 at Toorak, Melbourne, Victoria.

Their eldest son Ian Fairbairn competed as a rower in the 1924 Summer Olympics and was a financier who originated the unit trust. Their second son, Sydney Fairbairn, was a cricketer and British Army officer. Steve Fairbairn's nephew George Eric Fairbairn won a silver medal in the 1908 Summer Olympics.

== Bibliography ==
- Rowing Notes, 1926.
- Slowly Forward, 1929.
- Some Secrets of Successful Rowing, 1930.
- Fairbairn of Jesus (autobiography), 1931.
- Chats on Rowing, 1934.

== See also ==
- List of Cambridge University Boat Race crews
