= Gregory Brazel =

Australian serial killer

Gregory John Brazel
- Born: Gregory John Brazel; 17 November 1954 (age 71); Blacktown, New South Wales, Australia
- Convictions: Contempt of court Armed robbery Murder x3 Arson; Bribery
- Penalty: Life imprisonment x3, non-parole period of 30 years

Details
- Victims: 3
- Span of crimes: 1982–1990
- Country: Australia
- State: Victoria
- Date apprehended: 26 September 1990

Gregory John 'Bluey' Brazel (born 17 November 1954) is a convicted Australian serial killer, arsonist, and armed robber currently serving three consecutive life sentences for the murders of sex workers Sharon Taylor and Roslyn Hayward in 1990, and the murder of Mordialloc hardware store owner Mildred Hanmer during an armed robbery in 1982 to which he confessed some eighteen years later.

Brazel is often described as one of the most manipulative and violent prisoners in Victoria's prison system, and was estimated to be worth more than A$500,000 in 2000. He became eligible for parole in 2020, however as of 2024 he is still incarcerated at HM Prison Barwon.

== Early life ==
Brazel enlisted in the Australian Army in 1974 and trained at 1RTB (Kapooka), 14 Platoon B Company, and in September was posted to the Australian Army Medical Training School in Healesville, Victoria.

In 1976, Brazel took five privates hostage during an army medical corps exercise in Healesville. Shots were fired before Brazel was persuaded to release the hostages. He was later dishonorably discharged.

== Murders ==
=== Sharon Taylor ===
On 28 May 1990, while on early release from prison, Brazel murdered sex worker Sharon Taylor. Her body was found in a shallow grave at Barongarook, Victoria, south of Colac on 23 September 1990.

=== Roslyn Hayward ===
On 13 September 1990, Brazel murdered sex worker Roslyn Hayward at Sorrento. Her body was not discovered until 1 October 1990.

=== Mildred Hanmer ===
Mildred Teresa Hanmer was shot in the chest on 20 September 1982 during an armed robbery at her Mordialloc hardware and gift store. She later died in the Alfred Hospital from her injuries. Her murder remained unsolved until August 2000.

On 18 August 2000, Brazel voluntarily confessed to the 1982 murder, seeking to make a deal with police officers that no life term would be imposed before agreeing to make a statement.

== Prison life ==
Brazel has continued to regularly offend while imprisoned and is often described as being manipulative and violent. In November 1991, Brazel took a staff member hostage while imprisoned at the HM Melbourne Assessment Prison when he learned of his impending transfer to HM Prison Pentridge.

In 2006, Brazel was awarded A$12,000 in damages in an out of court settlement after suffering a violent attack with a broken bottle while imprisoned at Melbourne's privately operated Port Phillip Correctional Centre in Laverton in May 2001. In October 2006, Brazel was caught collecting personal information relating to senior prison staff.

Brazel was assaulted by fellow inmates whilst detailed in the high security unit of HM Prison Barwon. Brazel sought County Court approval and, on appeal, was granted access to documents including a prison map and an incident report so he could sue the Victorian Government for failure to exercise reasonable care to protect him.

In 2022, Brazel accused prison officers of interfering with his mail and destroying his USB flash drive, claiming 99% of all his legal documents were lost. His case against the state was set for August 2023.

== Summary of criminal convictions ==
During the period of March 1983 until August 2000 Brazel was convicted of 37 offences from fifteen court appearances. Offences since 1992 occurred while Brazel was in prison custody apart from the 2005 conviction for murder which occurred in 1982.

| Date | Conviction | Sentence | Notes |
|---|---|---|---|
| June 1983 | Contempt of court | Sentenced to 2 years imprisonment | |
| November 1987 | Armed robbery | Sentenced to 6 years imprisonment | |
| August 1992 | Murder | Sentenced to 20 years imprisonment Reduced to 17 years on appeal | |
| May 1993 | Murder | Sentenced to 20 years imprisonment | |
| October 1994 | False imprisonment Threatening to kill | Sentenced to 7 years imprisonment | |
| June 1997 | Arson | Sentenced to 2 years imprisonment | |
| December 1998 | Bribery | Sentenced to 2 years imprisonment | |
| 22 March 2005 | Murder | Sentenced to life imprisonment | |

== See also ==
- List of serial killers by country
