= Matthew Thompson (writer) =

American-born Australian writer

Matthew Thompson is an American-born Australian writer. He has written a number of books, including Mayhem: The Strange and Savage Saga of Christopher 'Badness' Binse, My Colombian Death and Running with the Blood God.
