= Peak Downs =

Coordinates: 22°19′30″S 148°0′0″E

Peak Downs is a geographic area, and formerly a station, in the vicinity of Clermont, Central Queensland. In the 1860s and 1870s the area was known as "the Peak Downs".

The morphology of this region consisted of numerous distinct peaks of basalt-capped sandstone erupting from a plane, and the area has been worked for copper and gold extraction since as far back as the 1870s, when it was the primary source for material exported via nearby St. Lawrence, and perhaps earlier. At least one such peak remains, Wolfgang Peak, part of the Peak Range between Moranbah, Clermont, and Dysart, first surveyed on 18 January 1845, by Leichhardt's expedition. Many of the peaks so mapped were named for members or supporters of this expedition. Much of that geography has been removed by open-cut mining, including that at the large Peak Downs Mine.

The Shire of Peak Downs, was formerly defined in this area, but has since been amalgamated with neighbouring shires to form the Central Highlands Region shire.
