= Lara, Victoria =

Lara
- Suburb
- Interactive map of Lara
- Coordinates: 38°01′0″S 144°25′0″E
- Country: Australia
- State: Victoria
- City: Geelong
- LGA: City of Greater Geelong

Government
  - State electorate: Lara
  - Federal division: Corio

Area
  - Total: 14.5 km^{2} (5.6 sq mi)

Population
  - Total: 19,014 (2021 census)
  - Density: 1,311/km^{2} (3,396/sq mi)
- Postcode: 3212
Suburbs around Lara
Anakie	Little River	Little River
Anakie	Lara	Avalon
Lovely Banks	Corio	Avalon

Lara is a town in Victoria, 18 km north-east of the Geelong CBD. Situated inland from the Princes Freeway to Melbourne, it lies 6 km south of the You Yangs. Its population at the 2021 census was 19,014.

The name "Lara" derives from a Wadawurrung word laa, laarr or larra, meaning "stone" or "building made of stone". It was first assigned by Europeans to the cadastral parish of Lara, situated to the west of the You Yangs, before being applied to the town in 1874.

== History ==
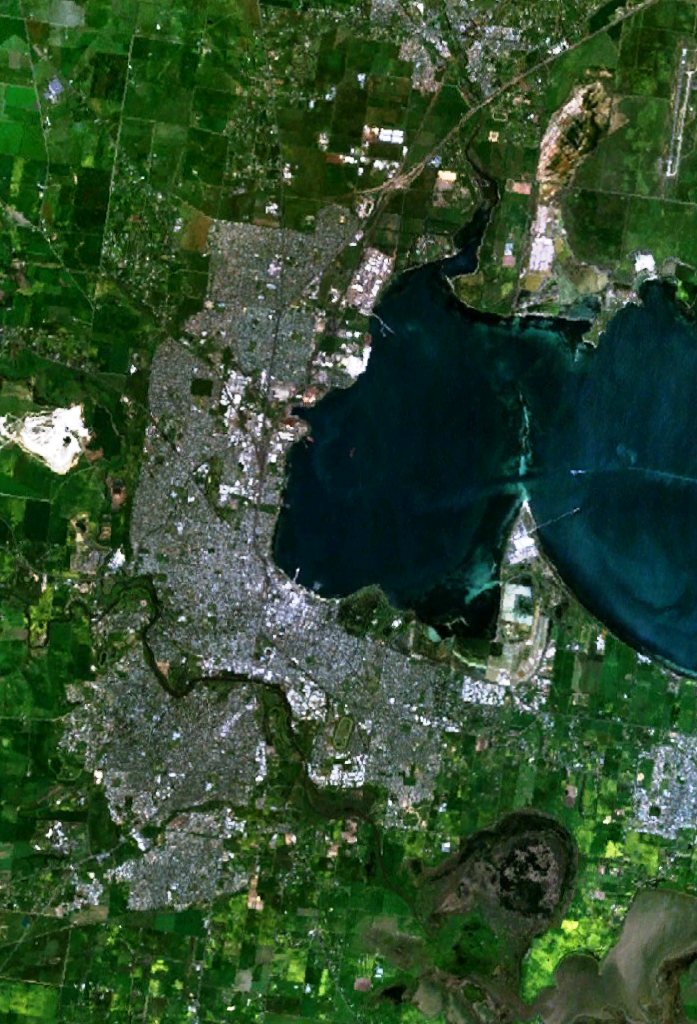
Landsat 7 image of the Greater Geelong area. Lara is visible at the top of the photo

Lara and its surrounding land was occupied for tens of thousands of years before European colonisation by the Wadawurrung people.

The explorers Hume and Hovell arrived at Lara on 16 December 1824, believing that they had reached Westernport Bay.

The area was originally named Kennedy's Creek, but by the time the railway through the town was opened in 1857 (along with the local railway station), it was known as Duck Ponds. Several residential subdivisions were then announced, including one in the area now known as Lara Lake, the "Cheddar" estate to its west, and the "Swindon" estate to the south-east of the modern town centre. The Duck Ponds Post Office opened on 1 March 1858.

In 1864, the Shire of Corio set up its base in Duck Ponds. The town's name was seen as undignified for a Shire seat, so the council asked the Government to rename the town "Grantham", after the then-Minister for Lands James Macpherson Grant. The request was rejected, but in 1872 the town was renamed "Hovell's Creek" by Grant's successor James Casey. The new name was deeply unpopular among locals. For two years Casey stood firm, but in 1874 he relented and allowed the Shire council to choose a new name for the town, from the options "Corio", "Lara" and "Grantham". On 21 August 1874, the Township of Lara was proclaimed.

The station was renamed Lara in 1875; the Post Office, having been renamed Hovell's Creek in 1872, was finally renamed Lara in 1884.

The population had grown to a few hundred by 1890, and several facilities such as schools and churches were built, although a water supply was not provided until 1947.

In January 1969, 17 people were killed in a bushfire which ravaged Lara. Most of the victims were trapped in or near their cars by a fast-moving grass fire, while travelling on the Princes Highway.

Several scenes from the 1979 feature film, Mad Max, were shot on location around Lara, as well as several scenes from the ABC mockumentary, We Can Be Heroes: Finding The Australian of the Year, in which the town carried the fictional name "Dunt".

The town's history is being preserved at the Lara Museum and Historical Centre on the corner of Forest and Canterbury roads. It is housed in an historic property, formerly the Lake Bank Hotel (circa 1860), which was renovated by local businessman, Lino Bisinella, and handed over in 2013 to the community group which runs the museum, Lara Heritage and Historical Society Inc.

=== Heritage listed sites ===
Lara contains a number of heritage listed sites, including:

- 605 Bacchus Marsh Road, Elcho Homestead
- Princes Highway, Hume and Hovell Monument
- 108 Windermere Road, Pirra Homestead

== Population ==
According to the 2021 census, there were 19,014 people in Lara. The 2021 Australian census data breaks down Lara's demographics as:

- Aboriginal and Torres Strait Islander people made up 2.1% of the population.
- 79.5% of people were born in Australia. The next most common countries of birth were England 3.6%, India 1.9%, Philippines 1.7% and New Zealand 1.2%.
- 80.2% of people spoke only English at home. Other languages spoken at home included Punjabi 1.4%, Tagalog 0.9%, Croatian 0.6%, and Italian 0.5%.
- The most common responses for religion were No Religion 41.5% and Catholic 22.6%.

== Geography ==
Hovell's Creek runs through Lara and ends at Limeburners Bay, a small inlet of Corio Bay. Owing to the poor soils and low runoff inherent in Australian streams, along with the fact the region is the driest in southern Victoria because of the Otway Ranges’ rain shadow (receiving about 425 millimetres (17 in) per year), the creek is ephemeral and is not useful as a water source. Granite peaks known as the You Yangs, 4 kilometres north of Lara, rise dramatically to a height of 352m and can be seen from most areas of Geelong.

== Education ==
Lara offers education through its three primary schools; St. Anthony's Primary School, Lara Lake Primary School and Lara Primary School. Lara Secondary College, which accommodates years 7 - 12 and the VCE, opened in 2004. Lara is also home to Avalon College, a school for International Students preparing them for traditional schools.

== Industry ==
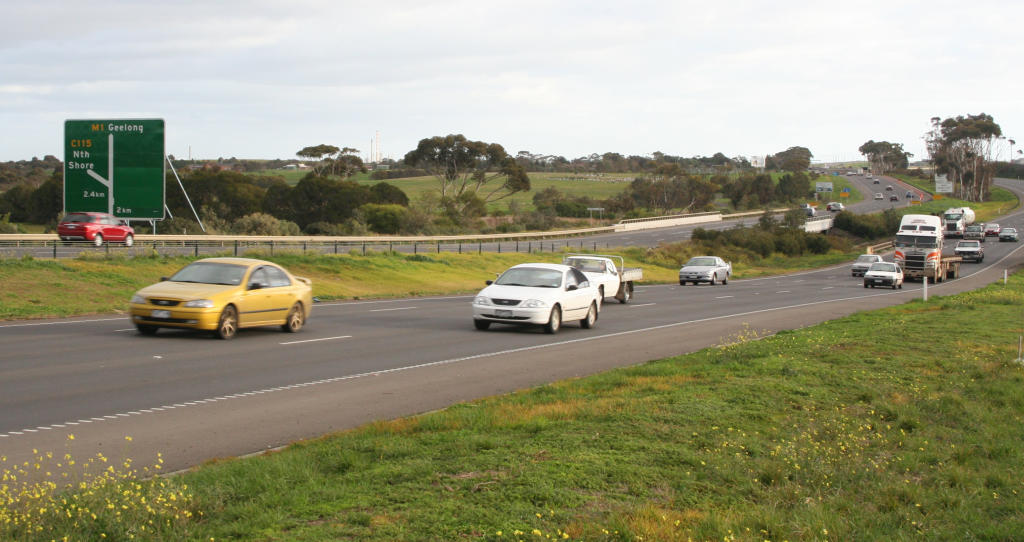
Princes Freeway at Lara

On Lara's outskirts are industry parks and three prisons – the maximum security HM Prison Barwon, opened in January 1990, the medium security Marngoneet Correctional Centre, opened in March 2006, and the maximum security Western Plains Correctional Centre, opened in 2025. The former Pirra Homestead served as a home for girls age 13 to 18, part of the Victorian youth welfare system, until the 1980s.

Lara is home to St Laurence Park retirement village, which is set on 42 acres (170,000 m^{2}) of parkland near the centre of the town. It includes 119 fully self-contained units, 17 apartments and a holiday unit. A more recent development on the eastern edge of Lara is Lakeside Lara, "a retirement or over 55's lifestyle community" with more than 200 cottages.

Ford Australia operates a proving grounds for automotive testing and evaluation at the north end of the You Yangs.

== Transport ==
Lara has regular V/Line passenger train services on the Geelong line to Melbourne and Geelong to cater for the many residents who commute to work each day via Lara railway station. Lara has become a popular place to live for those wishing to work in Melbourne and have ties to Geelong. After the extension of Myki ticketing to the Geelong line in 2013, Lara became a Myki Zone 2, 3 & 4 station. Following the introduction of 20-minute off-peak services in 2015, there has been an increase in passenger traffic by train between Geelong and Lara.

Under contract to Public Transport Victoria, CDC Geelong operates bus services in the Lara area on routes 10 and 12, running to and from Lara station. Taxis are also available.

Avalon Airport is nearby. On 15 March 2026, bus Route 18 was introduced between Lara Station and Avalon Airport. Bus route 11 was removed at this time.

== Amenities ==
Lara has a post office, a Bendigo Bank Community Bank branch, several hairdressers and barbers, a travel agency, a butcher, a greengrocer, a Woolworths (opened in 2016) and a Coles supermarket. The Coles supermarket opened in December 2014 as part of the town centre expansion on the site of Austin Park, as well as a re-alignment of Waverley Road to create a more spacious site for the supermarket and the re-configuration of the park. There are four real estate agencies and one newsagency. The Lara Library opened in 2011.

There are several eat-in bakery/coffee/cake shops, three Thai restaurants, two Indian restaurants, three pizza shops, three fish-and-chip shops, McDonald's, Subway, three Chinese and noodle shops and other take-aways. There are two petrol stations, one of which is open for business 24 hours a day, seven days a week.

Lodging and entertainment are provided by a pub/hotel, sports club, and a lawn bowls club.

== Sport ==
Lara has an Australian rules football team competing in the Geelong Football League. There are two soccer clubs in Lara: North Geelong Warriors FC play in the National Premier Leagues Victoria 2 and Lara United FC play in division 5 of the Victorian State League. Lara is also home to the Lara Giants Basketball club that was established in 1992 and competes in Geelong United Basketball association.

Lara Golf Club (known as Elcho Park Golf Club until 2014) is an 18 hole course and driving range on Elcho Road.

== Environmental issues ==
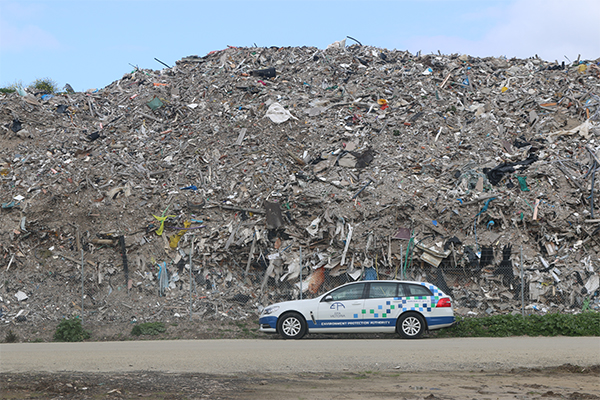
EPA car in front of stockpiles at the recycling facility in Lara

C&D recycling, a recycling facility on Broderick Road, failed to comply with its permit conditions for several years before going into liquidation in 2019. EPA Victoria estimated that 286,200m3 of waste was stockpiled at the site, creating a high fire risk. The cleaning-up started in September 2019 and ended in June 2022, contractors handling large amounts of timber and soil as well as concrete, bricks, plaster, plastic, glass and ceramics. Soil contaminated with asbestos was also removed. The Victorian state government provided $30 million to the operation in order to minimise fire risk.

== See also ==
- Avalon Airport
- Avalon Raceway
- Serendip Sanctuary
