= Dino Dibra =

Australian suspected murderer and victim of the Melbourne gangland killings

- Born: April 18, 1975; Melbourne
- Died: October 14, 2000 (aged 25); Sunshine West, Victoria
- Occupation: Drug Dealer
- Known for: Participant in the Melbourne gangland killings
- Status: Deceased
- Allegiance: The Sunshine Crew

Dino Dibra (18 April 1975 – 14 October 2000), also known as The Sunshine Boy, was an Australian suspected murderer and a victim of the Melbourne gangland killings.

== Imprisonments ==
Dibra was born to Albanian parents. Between the ages of 15 and 18, Dibra was charged with a number of petty offences, including possession of drugs (marijuana). At the age of 19, he was charged with threatening to kill, threatening to inflict serious injury and unlawful drug possession. He was jailed and fined for these offences. On 15 October 1996, Dibra was imprisoned again, this time for 18 months for serious reckless driving offences.

During his sentencing, the judge noted that Dibra had "the worst driving record I have ever seen".

== Drug dealer ==
Police believe that Dibra and an old friend Rocco Arico, were partners in selling and distributing cocaine, ecstasy and amphetamines. They were regular faces at the Dome nightclub in Prahran, Melbourne, as well as a Crown Casino nightclub. The Purana Taskforce have stated on numerous occasions that Dibra was associated with several Melbourne underworld figures, including Mark Moran, Jason Moran, Andrew Veniamin, Carl Williams and Nik Radev at different times, and it is believed that these associations pertained to high-volume drug supply.

In 1998, a bouncer was shot outside the Dome Nightclub in Prahran. Dibra was the principal suspect in the shooting and it is believed that the shooting followed a dispute relating to drug supply.

== Kidnapping ==
On 2 August 1999, Dibra and friend Rocco Arico were among several men charged over the assault and kidnapping of an associate of Arico, Richard 'Mad Richard' Mladenich. At the time, police had bugged Dibra's house and car, seeking information in relation to the Dome bouncer shooting. The police subsequently raided Dibra's Taylors Lakes house, where Mladenich was still locked inside the boot. Dibra and Arico were charged with a variety of offences over the incident.

== Implication in underworld murders ==
On 23 November 1998 Charles Hegyalji, known as "Mad Charlie", was killed at his Caulfield home. Dibra was implicated in the murder and it is believed that it was drug-debt-related. Hegyalji's close friend, Mark Brandon "Chopper" Read, in the documentary film Fat Belly: Chopper Unchopped, revealed that he believes Dibra was the perpetrator.

Whilst it had been believed that underworld figure "Mad" Richard Mladenich was also shot dead by Dino Dibra in a room in the seedy St Kilda Esquire Hotel on 16 May 2000, Mark Moran and Rocco Arico were also suspects, and on 30 October 2019 Victoria Police arrested Thomas “Little Thommy” Ivanovic for Mladenich’s murder.

== Murder ==
Dibra was shot dead outside his Krambruk Street home in Sunshine West on 14 October 2000 at approximately 9:15 pm. Police suspect that Dibra's murder was payback.

The Purana Taskforce stated publicly that Dibra was murdered by Andrew Veniamin, though they never charged Veniamin over Dibra's murder. Veniamin and Paul Kallipolitis are suspected of having shot Dibra.

== Underbelly ==
Dino Dibra, as portrayed by Daniel Amalm in the TV series, Underbelly.

The character of Dino Dibra is portrayed in the Nine Network's television series Underbelly by Daniel Amalm. He first appeared in episode four (Cocksure) and in his opening scene, Dibra was shown shooting a character named Bruno Bolotzi, who later died, outside a nightclub.
