= Fat Tony & Co. =

Australian television limited series

- Genre: Crime; Drama
- Directed by: Peter Andrikidis; Andrew Prowse; Mitchell Sariovski; Bethany Chinn; Karl Zwicky; Shirley Barrett
- Starring: Robert Mammone; Gyton Grantley; Madeleine West; Hollie Andrew; Richard Cawthorne; Shane Jacobson
- Country of origin: Australia
- Original language: English
- No. of series: 1
- No. of episodes: 9

Production
- Executive producers: Des Monaghan; Greg Haddrick
- Producers: Jo Rooney; Andy Ryan; Peter Gawler; Elisa Argenzio
- Production location: Melbourne
- Running time: 48 minutes
- Production company: Screentime

Original release
- Network: Nine Network
- Release: 23 February – 6 April 2014

Fat Tony & Co. is a nine-episode Australian television series focusing on Tony Mokbel and covers the manhunt which lasted 18 months and dismantled a drug empire. It premiered on 23 February 2014 and concluded on 6 April 2014 on the Nine Network. It is part of the Underbelly franchise, with various actors reprising their role from previous series.

== Production ==
=== Conception ===
Fat Tony & Co. has been marketed as a sequel to the first series of Underbelly, however due to changes in funding with Screen Australia it was not branded as an Underbelly series. Fat Tony and Co actually runs chronologically alongside of Underbelly, with the storyline being told from the point of view of Mokbel. The first few episodes chronicle his rise while the "Melbourne gangland war" is taking place, but the later episodes focus on his disappearance and arrest in Greece, and other events that unfolded after the original series of Underbelly concluded.

After a rumour in November 2012, Fat Tony & Co. was officially announced on 3 August 2013. Production for the series began on 5 August 2013.

Fat Tony & Co. was directed by Peter Andrikidis, Andrew Prowse and Karl Zwicky, with Jo Rooney, Andy Ryan, Peter Gawler and Elisa Argenzio Lambert serving as producers.

While most of Fat Tony & Co. was shot in Melbourne, some sequences were filmed in Athens, Greece.

=== Plot ===
Tony Mokbel, runs a criminal enterprise, flees Melbourne to go to Greece. He is captured and returned home.

=== Casting ===
Most of the cast from the first series of Underbelly return to play the same characters, although some were unavailable to reprise their signature roles, such as Kat Stewart who played Roberta Williams, (replaced by Hollie Andrew), Caroline Gillmer who played Judy Moran (replaced by Debra Byrne) and Callan Mulvey who played Mark Moran (replaced by Jake Ryan).

== Cast ==
=== Regular ===
- Robert Mammone as Tony Mokbel
- Madeleine West as Danielle McGuire
- Gyton Grantley as Carl Williams
- Hollie Andrew as Roberta Williams
- Shane Jacobson as Det. Insp. Jim 'Big Kahuna' O'Brien
- Stephen Curry as Det. Sgt. Jim Coghlan
- Richard Cawthorne as Australian Federal Police agent Jarrod Ragg

=== Recurring and guest ===
- Vince Colosimo as Alphonse Gangitano
- Les Hill as Jason Moran
- Simon Westaway as Mick Gatto
- Kevin Harrington as Lewis Moran
- Gerard Kennedy as Graham Kinniburgh
- Debra Byrne as Judy Moran
- Rich Davine as Pasquale Barbaro
- Louise Mandylor as Laura Mokbel
- Jake Ryan as Mark Moran
- Jeremy Kewley as Des 'Tuppence' Moran
- Frank Sweet as Billy Fischer
- Brian Vriends as Det. Sgt. Malcolm Rosenes
- David Brown as Det. Sam Martone
- Nick Simpson-Deeks as Bruno Rich
- Simone Kessell as Tamara Chippindall
- Steve Bastoni as Homicide Det. Charlie Bezzina
- Nicholas Bishop as Det. Sgt. Paul Dale
- Louisa Mignone as Maria Tomasetti
- Mat Stevenson as Prosecutor
- Tom Wren as Willie Thompson
- Alex Tsitsopoulos as Milad Mokbel
- Vince Poletto as Horty Mokbel
- Samantha Tolj as Renee Mokbel
- Odette Joannidis as Carmel Mokbel
- Maria Mercedes as Agape Makrakanis
- Steve Mouzakis as Major George Kastanis
- Jason Gianginis as Incorruptible Police Detective
- Tony Nikolakopoulos as Stavros Makrakanis
- Robert Rabiah as Dario Mancini
- Costas Kilias as Head of Hellenic Anti Drug Dept
- James Chalas as Yiannis Vlahos Lawyer
- Zoe Cramond as Lawyer Zarah Garde-Wilson
- Alan King as Sean Grant
- Dean Cartmel as Phil Costa
- Lester Ellis Jr. as Johnny Tedesco
- Eddie Baroo as Scrooge
- Ian Bliss as Bernie Edwards
- Costas Kilias as George Saxionis (1 episode)
- Jodie Dry as Petria Knight (1 episode)
- Kym Valentine as Peg Mancini (1 episode)
- Paul Denny as Hippy Paul (1 episode)
- John Brumpton as Reuben Fox (2 episodes)

== Episodes ==
No.	Title	Directed by	Written by	Original release date	Prod. code	Aus. viewers (millions)
1	"The Tony Special"	Peter Andrikidis	Peter Gawler	23 February 2014	235400-1	1.621
In the opener of this series dramatizing the manhunt of drug kingpin Tony Mokbel, Detective Inspector Jim O'Brien observes Mokbel as the Carlton Crew contend with internal affairs. Meanwhile, Carl Williams vows revenge on the Morans after being injured in a skirmish with them.
2	"The Mexican Job"	Peter Andrikidis	Peter Gawler	23 February 2014	235400-2	1.401
Tony and the Carlton Crew import a huge hash shipment; the Victoria Drug Squad shares intelligence with Australian Federal Police agent Jarrod Ragg in a bid to bring down Mokbel and the Carlton Crew.
3	"When the Dogs Bark"	Andrew Prowse	Adam Todd	2 March 2014	235400-3	1.275
Tony fears for his own safety as mate Carl Williams ramps up his campaign of underworld murders. After being released from prison, Tony considers going straight as a property developer. Jason Moran has a final showdown with Carl Williams.
4	"Killers, Thieves & Lawyers"	Andrew Prowse	Adam Todd	9 March 2014	235400-4	1.095
When a hitman alleges Tony is involved in murder, Tony decides to skip bail and become Australia's most wanted man. Tony takes a massive gamble when he recruits a pair of cleanskins to run his drug empire while he is on the run.
5	"Where's Tony?"	Karl Zwicky	Adam Todd	16 March 2014	235400-5	1.153
After skipping bail, Tony hatches a risky plan to flee Australia and start a new life in Greece. With Tony on the run, the fight is on for control of his drug empire. The police face a wall of silence in their search for Fat Tony.
6	"A New Life"	Karl Zwicky	Jeff Truman	23 March 2014	235400-6	1.106
Tony fights sea-sickness as he sails from Perth to Athens to avoid capture by the police. Tony's pregnant girlfriend is followed by police as she travels through Europe to meet him. The police manhunt finally gets a break-through.
7	"The Incorruptibles"	Peter Andrikidis	Jeff Truman	30 March 2014	235400-7	0.601
Tony attempts to create a new drug empire whilst hiding in Athens, unaware that Detective Sergeant Jim Coghlan and Australian Federal Police agent Jarrod Ragg have arrived in Greece to work with the local Athens police – known as The Incorruptibles – to arrest Tony and return him to face justice in Australia.
8	"A Chip & a Chair"	Peter Andrikidis	Michaeley O'Brien	30 March 2014	235400-8	1.177
While Tony fights extradition in Athens, police swoop on his drug operations in Australia.
9	"Drawing Dead"	Peter Andrikidis	Michaeley O'Brien	6 April 2014	235400-9	0.631
Tony has a major victory against the police, but suspects his former mate Carl Williams has betrayed him. Carl's double-dealings with the police backfire when he is brutally murdered by a fellow inmate. Judy Moran takes revenge on Des 'Tuppence' Moran with disastrous consequences. Tony plays his final hand as the police close in, but it looks like he is 'drawing dead'.

== Series ratings ==
TV Season	No. of Episodes	Season Premiere	Season Final	Average Audience (millions)	Most Watched Episode	
TV Season	No. of Episodes	Season Premiere	Season Final	Average Audience (millions)	Episode	Viewers (millions)
2014	9	23 February 2014	6 April 2014	1.206	"The Tony Special"	1.621

== See also ==
- List of Australian television series
- Underbelly: A Tale of Two Cities
