= Betty King =

Australian judge

The Honourable Betty June King KC

Judge of the Supreme Court of Victoria
- In office 21 June 2005 – 14 August 2015

Judge of the County Court of Victoria
- In office 1 March 2000 – 21 June 2005

Personal details
- Education: University of Melbourne

Betty June King KC (c. 1951–) is an Australian jurist. She is a former judge of the Supreme Court of Victoria, in the Australian state of Victoria. She has served as a judge in the County Court of Victoria. She served as a member of the National Crime Authority in the 1990s.

== Education ==
King started her schooling at Westgarth Central School and then attended high school at University High School. She later studied law at Melbourne University, graduating in 1974.

== Early legal career ==
After completing her articles, she joined the Victorian Bar in 1975 at the age of 24, becoming only the twenty-fourth female barrister.

King was in 1986 the first female Prosecutor in Victoria, later becoming the first female Commonwealth prosecutor.

In 1992 King was one of the first Victorian women to be promoted to Queen's Counsel.

During the late 1990s King was a member of the National Crime Authority at one point acting as chair of the authority.

== Judicial career ==
=== County Court ===
In 2000 King was appointed a judge of the County Court, serving until her appointment as a judge of the Supreme Court of Victoria in 2005.

=== Supreme Court ===
King was sworn in as a judge of the Supreme Court of Victoria on 21 June 2005 and served until 14 August 2015.

==== Melbourne gangland trials ====
King presided over the prominent cases involving Melbourne criminal figure Carl Williams and his associates arising from the Melbourne gangland killings. In 2008 King ruled that the Underbelly television series could not be shown in the state of Victoria during Williams' murder trial. During the trial of Evangelos Goussis for the murder of Lewis Moran she banned a proposed television showdown on Today Tonight between Judy Moran and Williams' mother. While instructing the jury during Goussis' trial she referred to herself as the "queen of banning things".

==== Public statements ====
In May 2010 she spoke out against prominent defendants, their family members, and judges being treated as celebrities. King claimed to have had a Wikipedia article about her deleted. In 2008 a fake Facebook profile bearing her name was removed after a complaint.
