= Danielle McGuire =

Australian criminal (born 1973)

Danielle McGuire (born 1973) is a member of the Melbourne criminal underworld best known as the former girlfriend of Australian drug lord Tony Mokbel. Before her relationship with Mokbel, McGuire had an affair with drug dealer Mark Moran.

McGuire saw the opportunities that lay in supplying ecstasy and amphetamine tablets to young club patrons, and as early as 1997 was importing them to Australia. She later went on to pressing her own, an operation that was later picked up on by the likes of Mokbel, Moran and Carl Williams who created drug empires off the back of pill production, distribution and sales.

In March 2012, McGuire was the victim of an assault by an unidentified assailant.

== See also ==
- Jason Moran
- Melbourne gangland killings
