= Leslie Herbert Kane =

Australian gangster

- Born: 1 January 1945; Australia
- Died: 19 October 1978 (aged 33); Wantirna, Victoria, Australia
- Spouse(s): Trish, Judy
- Children: 3
- Convictions: Theft, assault

Leslie Herbert Kane (1 January 1945 – 19 October 1978) was an Australian gangster who lived in Melbourne, Australia. He became a member of the Federated Union of Painters and Dockers at the age of fourteen. By the time of Kane's death, he had appeared in court 27 times as the accused.

== Life ==
Kane was one of three brothers who also were in the same line of business, but Les was considered the most violent and unpredictable of the three. His brothers were Brian Kane and Raymond Kane. All eventually killed others: Les killed a fellow Painter and Docker, Brian killed Ray Bennett and Ray killed his estranged girlfriend.

Kane left school and became a member of the Painters and Dockers Union at the age of fourteen. He was married twice. Through Trish, his first wife, he had a son and two daughters, Suzanne and Trish. Trish later married Jason Moran, a member of the criminal Moran family, who was shot dead during the Melbourne's gangland war in June 2003.

== Murder ==
Kane's second wife was Judy. On the night of 19 October 1978, Kane, Judy and the children returned home to their Wantirna unit after visiting family. Judy found three gunmen lying in wait in her bedroom armed with silenced machine guns. Les Kane was in the bathroom when Judy was dragged to another room by one of the gunmen and the other two opened fire. The body of Les Kane was loaded into the boot of his distinctive pink Ford Futura by a fourth man believed to be hitman Rodney "The Duke" Collins who was outside during the murder. Kane's body was never found.

It is believed that the murder took place to eliminate the Kane brothers, following a fight between Brian Kane and Vincent Mikkleson in a Richmond pub, in which Brian was beaten and suffered the ignominy of having a chunk of an ear bitten off. Believing the Kane family would come after him, Mikkleson and his friends decided to strike first.

After the murders, Judy Kane observed the Painters and Dockers' code of silence and did not make contact with police. Rumours circulated among criminal and police circle alike, and the police eventually queried Judy about the whereabouts of Les Kane.

The three suspected gunmen were Raymond Patrick "Ray Chuck" Bennett, Mikkleson, and Laurence Pendergast. They were charged, but were acquitted in September 1979, primarily because Kane's body was not found. One, Ray Bennett, was shot the following year inside a courthouse where he was to face an armed robbery charge, by a man police believe to have been Brian Kane. Brian Kane was himself murdered on 26 November 1982, believed to be in revenge for Bennett's death.

== Daughter's conviction ==
In 2009, Kane's daughter, Suzanne was arrested and charged with being an accessory after the fact of murder, for her involvement in the murder of Desmond "Tuppence" Moran in Ascot Vale in June 2009, for which Judy Moran was convicted in March 2011. Suzanne Kane was sentenced on 2 February 2011 to two years' jail, suspended for two years.

== In popular culture ==
Leslie Kane was portrayed by Australian actor Martin Dingle-Wall in the television series Underbelly: A Tale of Two Cities in 2009.

== Books ==
- John Silverster and Andrew Rule, Tough - 101 Australian Gangsters, Floridale Productions and Sly Ink, 2002 ISBN 0-9579121-2-9
