= Fat Tony =

Fat Tony may refer to:

- Anthony Salerno, New York mobster also known as "Fat Tony"
- Fat Tony (The Simpsons), a recurring gangster character in the animated sitcom The Simpsons
- Fat Tony (rapper), American rapper from Houston, Texas
- Fat Tony & Co., Australian television series
- Tony Mokbel, Australian crime figure
