= Tony Mokbel =

Australian criminal (born 1965)

- Mokbel, wearing a wig, after his arrest in Greece
- Born: Antonios Sajih Mokbel; 11 August 1965 (age 61); Kuwait
- Status: Released on bail (4 April 2025)
- Convictions: Drug trafficking, drug importation
- Penalty: 30 years imprisonment (reduced to 26 years in 2023/further reduced to time served in 2025)

Mokbel Network
- Years active: 1997 - 2006
- Territory: Melbourne
- Ethnicity: Lebanese, Greeks
- Membership: c. 10 members
- Activities: drug trafficking
- Allies: Sunshine Crew, Lebanese mafia, Greek mafia
- Rivals: Radev Gang

Antonios Sajih Mokbel (Arabic: طوني مقبل; born 11 August 1965) is an Australian criminal who has been convicted of a number of offences, most prominently commercial drug trafficking. He has spent most of his life in Melbourne, Australia. Operation Purana alleged that he is the mastermind behind the Melbourne amphetamine trade. He has been linked to Carl Williams, and charged but not convicted of two murders in the Melbourne gangland war. He disappeared from Melbourne while on trial in March 2006, and was arrested by Greek police in Athens on 5 June 2007. He remained incarcerated until 4 April 2025 when he was bailed in the aftermath of the gangland Lawyer X scandal.

== Early life ==
Mokbel was born in Kuwait, where his Lebanese parents were expatriate workers. The family soon returned to their small village in Lebanon. His family were part of the country's Christian minority and chose to leave the country following sectarian conflict in the lead-up to the Lebanese Civil War.

Mokbel and his family moved to Melbourne when he was eight years old. They settled in the suburb of Brunswick, with his father working at the Ford factory and his mother at a meat factory. He spoke no English upon arrival in Australia and struggled at school, attending St Margaret Mary's Primary School, Brunswick High School and Moreland High School but was a keen Australian rules football player.

Mokbel's father drowned at Bondi Beach in Sydney on Mokbel's 16th birthday. Mokbel would later reflect that this left him "dirty on the world" and led to him dropping out of school. He had no criminal record prior to his father's death; a psychological profile completed following his incarceration concluded that this was a defining moment in his life.

== Career ==
Having left school, Mokbel began working as a dishwasher at a nightclub. He took various other jobs in the next years, before purchasing a milk bar with his wife at age 19. Together with his brother, he bought a pizza shop three years later, and would own and operate many other businesses throughout his career.

Mokbel was first arrested for a street brawl aged 18, and first incarcerated in 1992, having been caught attempting to bribe a judge. It was after this imprisonment that Mokbel became increasingly involved in the trafficking of drugs in Melbourne, in part to fund his accelerating gambling habit. He initially dealt in marijuana, then moved in to speed and later ecstasy pills as well. Mokbel found success in this trade, and rapidly gained wealth and notoriety throughout the next decade, forming an enterprise known as The Company.

In 1997, Mokbel luckily escaped injury and charges when one of his drug labs, worth 78 million dollars, exploded with him in it. This did not stymie the growth of his wealth in these years; by 2000, Mokbel owned a Ferrari car, expensive property, and racehorses. Indicating the scale of his operations at this time, it is known that Mokbel organised and received a shipment of ephedrine great enough to make two billion dollars of street drugs in late 2000.

It has been alleged that in late 2002 there was a meeting of more than ten Melbourne organised crime figures in Carlton. At that meeting, it is said that Mokbel was beaten, nearly to death, by Nik Radev's bodyguard, Western Australian Troy Mercanti, who was a member of the Coffin Cheaters motorcycle gang. Andrew Veniamin was ordered by his then close associate, Mick Gatto, to take Mokbel to a doctor. In the following couple of weeks, Mick Gatto was told that Veniamin and Mokbel became close allies.

Mokbel was alleged to have laundered over $2 million through At the Top of the Town, a high-profile Melbourne CBD brothel which he purchased through a business associate. One of Mokbel's amphetamine producers also ran a brothel in the Melbourne south-eastern suburbs while another Mokbel gang member who trafficked large amounts of drugs for Mokbel also ran a brothel.

=== Arrests, flight, and extradition ===
By the end of the 1990s, police had become increasingly aware of the scale of Mokbel's drugs trafficking operations. Nicola Gobbo (see Lawyer X scandal) used her position to illegally gather evidence on Mokbel's importations between October 2000 and August 2001. Mokbel was arrested in August 2001 for a small importation of cocaine of the previous year. He was bailed in 2002, but while on bail, he was caught attempting to organise an importation of drugs chemicals through an undercover AFP officer. He was arrested on associated charges in September 2005, but again was granted bail.

While still awaiting trial in early 2006, Mokbel received intelligence that Operation Purana officers intended to charge him with murder for his alleged role in two of the Melbourne gangland killings. He therefore skipped bail and fled after 19 March. Mokbel first hid himself at a friend's house in Bonnie Doon, Victoria, while an associate made preparations for a maritime escape to Greece. A team of Greek sailors were recruited, and a yacht was purchased and transported to Fremantle, Western Australia, where Mokbel was then driven in two hired vehicles. He set sail on November 11, and arrived in Greece on 24 December 2006.

While Mokbel was in hiding in Greece, police laid the murder charge that had provoked his flight. Mokbel was charged with Lewis Moran's murder on 28 February 2007. Police alleged that he and Carl Williams paid Keith Faure and Evangelos Goussis $150,000 for the March 2004 murder of Lewis Moran. Faure and Goussis were both convicted of the murder, but Mokbel was acquitted in September 2009. He was also charged in 2007 with the October 2003 murder of suspected drug dealer Michael Marshall, but prosecutors later withdrew this charge.

Mokbel became Australia's most wanted fugitive, until his eventual arrest by Greek police in Athens on 5 June 2007. Prior to his arrest, there was a $1 million bounty for information leading to his capture.

On 5 July 2007, Australia made a formal request to Greece for Mokbel's extradition. Mokbel made appeals against the extradition in three Australian courts, as well as the Athens Court of Appeal, Greek Supreme Court and the European Court of Human Rights (ECHR). These attempts were all unsuccessful, and on 8 May 2008, the Greek justice minister finally ratified the Greek Supreme Court's decision thus enabling Mokbel's extradition. Lebanon had also made a simultaneous request to Greece for Mokbel's extradition, which an international law expert described as "strange", leading to reported speculation that Mokbel had bribed Lebanese authorities to make the request. Lebanon would not extradite Mokbel to Australia, as he is a Lebanese citizen, and so successful extradition to Lebanon would have enabled his permanent escape.

On 17 May 2008, Mokbel arrived at Melbourne Airport aboard a Gulfstream jet along with eight Lebanese men. The cost of the $450,000 jet trip drew some criticism, but the Victorian state said they intended to regain the costs by seizure of Mokbel's criminal earnings.

=== Incarceration and appeals ===
Upon his return to Australia, Mokbel immediately began serving a twelve year prison sentence, having been convicted in absentia for a 2000 importation of Mexican cocaine. In July 2012, Mokbel was further sentenced to 30 years with a minimum term of 22 years in the Supreme Court of Victoria, having pleaded guilty to three charges(Quills and Orbital involving MDMA and Magnum involving methylamphetamine) associated with his role in The Company drug syndicate.

On 27 February 2012, Mokbel suffered a mild heart attack. On 11 February 2019, Mokbel was stabbed in Barwon Prison.

Mokbel appealed his convictions on the basis that his barrister, Nicola Gobbo, was simultaneously acting as a police informant (see Lawyer X scandal). His appeal of his 2006 conviction for cocaine importation was successful, although he had already entirely served that sentence. In 2023, Mokbel's sentence was reduced from 30 years with a non-parole period of 22 years to a 26-year sentence with a 20-year non-parole period. The appeals judge announced that there were several factors that were also considered in reducing the sentence, including a 2019 prison yard assault and the impact COVID-19 had on the prison system. The reduced sentence meant that Mokbel was to be eligible for parole by 2031. Mokbel was released on bail on 4 April 2025, pending an appeal on the other three charges. On 3 October 2025, Mokbel won his appeal on the MDMA charges. The Quills charge was acquited and the Orbital charge was forced to be retrialed. Afterward, in November, Mokbel's sentence for Magnum was reduced to time served, but still under bail conditions pending the retrial. On 6 February 2026, Mokbel was released after prosecutors withdrew the planned retrial.

== Personal life ==
Mokbel married Carmel DeLorenzo in 1989. They had worked alongside each other before their marriage at Mokbel's milk bar, and continued to work together for several years at his pizza restaurant. Mokbel and DeLorenzo had two children together, named Sajih and Susan Mokbel. Mokbel had numerous affairs during his marriage to Carmel, and in late 2000 left his wife and began a long-term relationship with Danielle McGuire (although Carmel and Mokbel's divorce was only finalised in 2006). Mokbel and McGuire had one child together, born in 2006 and named Renate after Mokbel's sister-in-law. McGuire separated from Mokbel in 2007 while he was incarcerated.

== Court cases ==
- R v Moran & Mokbel [1998] VSCA 64 (9 October 1998), Court of Appeal (Vic).
- DPP v Mokbel [2001] VSC 403 (19 October 2001), Supreme Court (Vic).
- Mokbel v DPP [2002] VSC 127 (26 April 2002), Supreme Court (Vic).
- Mokbel v DPP (No 2) [2002] VSC 312 (9 August 2002), Supreme Court (Vic).
- Mokbel v DPP (No 3) [2002] VSC 393 (4 September 2002), Supreme Court (Vic).
- R v Mokbel [2005] VSC 410 (4 November 2005), Supreme Court (Vic).
- Mokbel v DPP [2005] VSC 476 (13 December 2005), Supreme Court (Vic).
- R v Mokbel (No 2) [2005] VSC 502 (19 December 2005), Supreme Court (Vic).
- R v Mokbel [2006] VSC 119 (31 March 2006), Supreme Court (Vic).
- Mokbel v Attorney-General for the Commonwealth of Australia [2007] FCA 1536 (5 October 2007), Federal Court.
- Mokbel v Attorney-General for the Commonwealth of Australia [2007] FCAFC 161 (12 October 2007), Federal Court (Full Court).
- R v Mokbel [2010] VSCA 11 (11 February 2010), Court of Appeal (Vic).
- News Digital Media Pty Ltd v Mokbel [2010] VSCA 51 (18 March 2010), Court of Appeal (Vic).
- R v Mokbel [2012] VSC 255 (3 July 2012), Supreme Court (Vic).
- Mokbel v R [2013] VSCA 118 (17 May 2013), Court of Appeal (Vic).
- Mokbel v R [2022] VSCA 83 (5 June 2022), Court of Appeal (Vic).
- Mokbel v R [2023] VSCA 40 (7 March 2023), Court of Appeal (Vic).
- Mokbel v R [2025] VSCA 62 (4 April 2025), Court of Appeal (Vic).
- Mokbel v R [2025] VSCA 243 (3 October 2025), Court of Appeal (Vic).
- Mokbel v R [No.2] [2025] VSCA 291 (6 November 2025), Court of Appeal (Vic).

== In popular culture ==
Mokbel is played by actor Robert Mammone in the Australian drama TV series Underbelly and Fat Tony & Co. Mokbel was the main character of the latter series.

Robert Mammome reprised his role as Tony in Channel 9's 2020 series Informer 3838.
