= Harry M. Miller =

New Zealand Australian promoter (1934–2018)

- Born: Harry Maurice Millar; 6 January 1934; Auckland, New Zealand
- Died: 4 July 2018 (aged 84); Sydney, New South Wales, Australia
- Occupations: Promotor, publicist, media agent
- Years active: 1957−2011
- Known for: Pan Pacific Productions, Computicket, The Harry M.Miller Group

Harry Maurice Miller (6 January 1934 – 4 July 2018) was a New Zealand Australian promoter, publicist and media agent.

== Life and career ==
Born on 6 January 1934 in New Zealand, Miller grew up in the Auckland suburb of Grey Lynn. He moved to Australia in 1963, where he established a company called Pan Pacific Productions with Keith and Dennis Wong, owners of the noted Sydney nightclub Chequers.

During the 1960s, Pan Pacific promoted many concert and theatrical tours of Australia and New Zealand, including Louis Armstrong, Del Shannon, the Everly Brothers, Arthur Rubinstein, Herman's Hermits, the Rolling Stones, the Beach Boys (during the surfing 1964 tour), Judy Garland, Sammy Davis Jr., Sarah Vaughan, Dizzy Gillespie, Ella Fitzgerald, Chubby Checker, Eartha Kitt and Shirley Bassey During the mid-1960s, Pan Pacific was in competition in the pop tour market with rival promoter Aztec Services Ltd in Melbourne headed by promoter Kenn Brodziak, but by the late 1960s Miller and Brodziak had become friends and colleagues and subsequently collaborated on many concert and theatrical promotions. During this period Miller also expanded into personal management; his first client was pioneering TV chef Graham Kerr, already a household name in New Zealand, who became a national TV star in Australia before launching a successful international career.

As a talent manager, Miller served as the manager of numerous Australian personalities including Barry Humphries, Graham Kennedy, Maggie Tabberer, Stuart Wagstaff and Carmen Duncan.

In 1969, Miller discovered 16-year-old American singer Marcia Hines in Boston, Massachusetts, while casting African-American performers for the Australian stage version of Hair, which he was producing. Hines flew to Australia, unaware that she was already six months pregnant, and Miller acted as her legal guardian in Australia until she turned 21. Miller went on to produce the Australian productions of Jesus Christ Superstar in 1972 and The Rocky Horror Show in 1974, both of which used many of the production staff from Hair including director Jim Sharman.

In 1970, Miller joined the council of the Art Gallery of New South Wales, and was elected chairman of the gallery's society.

== Legal issues ==
In 1978, Miller started a ticketing company called Computicket, which went into receivership within six months. On 30 April 1982, Miller was found guilty of aiding and abetting the misappropriation of $728,000 in funds and sentenced to three years in jail. The verdict led to the collapse of the company, and he served ten months in prison at Long Bay and Cessnock Correctional Centres.

== Celebrity agent and manager ==
Miller was the founder and director of the Harry M. Miller Group, based in Moore Park, Sydney. His agency represented a varied client base of well-known figures in Australia, including all contestants on Big Brother, Lindy Chamberlain, Stuart Diver (the only survivor of the 1997 Thredbo landslide), Judy Moran (wife of slain Melbourne underworld figure Lewis Moran), and Gai Waterhouse (a horseracing trainer). Miller gave advice and managed communication, negotiations and media attention surrounding individuals or companies that found themselves under intense public spotlight.

== Family ==
Miller had four wives and five children. He had a relationship with Deborah Hutton, 27 years his junior from the 1980s for 10 years.

== Death ==
Miller died at age 84 in Sydney, Australia, on 4 July 2018, after a vascular dementia diagnosis in 2011. He died with his long-term partner Simmone Logue, daughters Justine, Brook and Lauren, and their mother Wendy by his side.
