= Alphonse Gangitano =

Australian criminal

- Born: Alphonse John Gangitano; 22 April 1957; Melbourne, Victoria, Australia
- Died: 16 January 1998 (aged 40); Templestowe, Victoria, Australia
- Other name: Black Prince of Lygon Street
- Occupations: Mobster, Extortionist
- Known for: Participant in the Melbourne gangland killings
- Spouse: Virginia Gangitano
- Children: 2
- Status: Deceased (homicide)
- Allegiance: The Carlton Crew

Alphonse John Gangitano (22 April 1957 – 16 January 1998) was an Australian criminal from Melbourne, Victoria. Nicknamed the "Black Prince of Lygon Street", Gangitano was the face of an underground organisation known as the Carlton Crew. He was also an associate of alleged organised crime bosses Tom Domican (Sydney) and John Kizon (Perth).

Gangitano is considered to be the second of the thirty Melbourne gangland killings between 1998 and 2010, when he was murdered in 1998. Gangitano was portrayed by Vince Colosimo in the 2008 TV series Underbelly and Fat Tony & Co, and by Elan Zavelsky in the 2009 TV series Underbelly: A Tale of Two Cities.

== Early life ==
Gangitano was born on 22 April 1957. He attended De La Salle College and Marcellin College. In later years through the 1980s and 1990s, it was later alleged that he was a co-owner of a King Street nightclub and numerous fight promotions and other ventures that went on to include horse racing and protection rackets. At the height of Gangitano's criminal career, he was earning an estimated $125,000–$200,000 a month as a high-profile member of the Carlton Crew. Unlike other criminals, Gangitano purely wanted to be a criminal from a young age.

== King Street nightclub attack ==
Alphonse Gangitano, Jason Moran and associate Tony Rapasarda were charged over serious assaults on several patrons at the Sports Bar nightclub in King Street, Melbourne on 19 December 1995.

Moran later said of Gangitano: "He's a fucking lulu ... if you smash five pool cues and an iron bar over someone's head ... you're a fucking lulu". The attack was portrayed on Underbelly.

== Murder ==
On the day of his death, 16 January 1998, Gangitano was reported to have had a telephone conversation with Kizon. That same day, Graham Kinniburgh drank at the Laurel Hotel in Ascot Vale with associate Lou Cozzo before driving to Gangitano's home in Templestowe. At a subsequent coroner's inquest, evidence was presented that Kinniburgh and Jason Moran were in Gangitano's home that night.

Kinniburgh left Gangitano's house shortly after 11 pm to purchase cigarettes at a 7-Eleven. Upon his return 30 minutes later, he found that Gangitano had been shot several times in the head while in the laundry. Gangitano's de facto wife, Virginia, was with the body. Traces of Kinniburgh's blood were later discovered on the back flyscreen door at Gangitano's home.

Kinniburgh reportedly respected the code of silence, frustrating police investigating the murder. Gangitano's pallbearers included suspected underworld figures Mick Gatto and John Kizon. Gangitano is survived by his wife and two daughters, and was widely believed to have had another child - with whom he had no contact - to an unidentified woman.

Moran allegedly pulled out a gun after an argument with Gangitano and shot him in the arm and head as he fled towards the laundry. The murder may have led to as many as 75 revenge assaults on underworld members. In 1995, Gangitano was charged with shooting dead petty criminal Gregory John Workman at 1 Wando Grove, St Kilda East; however, Gangitano never went to trial over the shooting after two witnesses retracted their statements.

Kinniburgh and Moran themselves were both later murdered.

== See also ==
- List of unsolved murders (1980–1999)
