= Jason Moran =

Jason Moran may refer to:

- Jason Moran (criminal) (1967–2003), Australian mobster
- Jason Moran (musician) (born 1975), American jazz pianist
