= Robert Mammone =

Australian actor

- Born: Adelaide, Australia
- Occupation: Actor
- Years active: 1985–present
- Known for: Underbelly, Fat Tony & Co; Informer 3838; Home And Away

Robert Mammone is an Australian actor. He is best known for his portrayal of drug baron Tony Mokbel in the television series Underbelly and its sequels.

== Early life and education ==
Robert Mammome was born in Adelaide, South Australia.

== Career ==
Mammone played the main villain opposite former WWE wrestler Stone Cold Steve Austin in the WWE Films action movie The Condemned, and portrayed Carlos 'Charlie' Blanka in Street Fighter, opposite Jean-Claude Van Damme and Raul Julia.

He is best known for his portrayal of convicted drug baron Tony Mokbel (Note: As of April 2025, Mokbel was released from prison after the collapse of his case due to the Lawyer X scandal.) in the Australian television series Underbelly and its sequels, Fat Tony & Co and Informer 3838.

Mammone also played AK in The Matrix movies, Sid Walker in the soap opera Home and Away, and Tim Palmer in Sons and Daughters.

He has also appeared in Janet King, Brock and Reckoning.

== Filmography ==
=== Television ===
Year	Title	Role	Notes	Ref
2025	Darby and Joan	Vince Sipala	Guest: 1 episode	
2024	Troppo	Max	3 episodes	
2019–2020	Reckoning	Chief Randy Sosa	TV series, 9 episodes	
2020	Informer 3838	Tony Mokbel	TV miniseries, 2 episodes	
2019	Total Control	Bill (voice)	TV series, 1 episode	
2019	Blue Water Empire	Major	TV miniseries	
2018	Smart Street	Vince	TV series, 1 episode	
2017	Blue Murder: Killer Cop	James Kinch	TV miniseries, 1 episode	
2017	Janet King	Darren Foulkes	TV series, 4 episodes	
2016	No Activity	Additional voices	TV series, 3 episodes	
2016	Brock	Eric 'Rick' Dowker	TV miniseries, 1 episode	
2015	The Principal	Dino Abbadelli	TV miniseries, 4 episodes	
2015	Miss Fisher's Murder Mysteries	Guido Lupinacci	TV series, 1 episode	
2014	Fat Tony & Co	Tony Mokbel	TV miniseries, 9 episodes	.
2009–2013	Home and Away	Sid Walker	736 episodes	
2011	East West 101	Oliver Troy	TV series, 6 episodes	
2009	Neighbours	Phil Andrews	TV series, 5 episodes	
2009	Carla Cametti PD	Tony Cametti	TV miniseries, 6 episodes	
2007–2008	Satisfaction	Nick	TV series, 11 episodes	
2008	Underbelly	Tony Mokbel	TV series, 9 episodes	
2007	The Starter Wife	Bob	TV miniseries, 2 episodes	
2007	Dangerous	Craig Lukovic	TV series, 8 episodes	
2006	Nightmares & Dreamscapes	Peter Jennings / Jagger	TV anthology series, 2 episodes	
2005–2006	The Alice	Simon	TV series, 3 episodes	
2004–2005	The Cooks	Michael	TV series, 5 episodes	
2004	Salem's Lot	Dr. James Cody	TV miniseries, 2 episodes	
2002	Beastmaster	Arnath	TV series, 1 episode	
2002	The Lost World	Prof Campbell	TV miniseries, 1 episode	
2001	Water Rats	Detective Agi Fatseas	TV series, 5 episodes	
2001	Outriders	Fenech	TV series, 4 episodes	
2000	Tales of the South Seas		TV series, 2 episodes	
2000	Blue Heelers	Bernie	TV series, 2 episodes	
1999	Stingers	Dino	TV series, 6 episodes	
1996–1998	Flipper	Mitch Phelps / CIA Agent	TV series, 2 episodes	
1998	Wildside	Jimmy Jago	TV series, 3 episodes	
1998	Good Guys, Bad Guys	Cosimo	TV series, 1 episode	
1996	Twisted Tales	Steven Gaines	TV series, 1 episode	
1991–1996	G.P.	Peter Fowler / Gerald Ferguson / Toby Carmichael	TV series, 4 episodes	
1996	The Beast	Ensign Raines	TV series, 2 episodes	
1995	Bordertown	Cesere	TV miniseries, 2 episodes	
1993	Time Trax	Zach Elliot	TV series, 1 episode	
1992	Police Rescue	Truck Driver	TV series, 1 episode	
1992	Bony		TV series, 1 episode	
1991	The Flying Doctors	Sam	TV series, 1 episode	
1990	Embassy	Rashid	TV series, 1 episode	
1987–1989	Rafferty's Rules	Craig / Brad	2 episodes	
1988	Emma: Queen of the South Seas	John Coe (age 20)	TV miniseries, 3 episodes	
1988	All the Way	Mr Bianchi	TV series, 3 episodes	
1985–1986	Sons and Daughters	Tim Palmer	TV series, 61 episodes	

=== Film ===
Year	Title	Role	Notes
2014	The Water Diviner	Colonel Demergelis	Feature film
2013	Mystery Road	Constable Roberts	Feature film
2011	Swerve	Logan	Feature film
2011	The Dragon Pearl	Philip Dukas	Feature film
2010	Arctic Blast	Charlie Barker	Film
2009	Storage	Francis	Feature film
2008	Bleeders	Lenny	Short film
2008	Eleven	Jake	Short film
2007	The Condemned	Ian 'Breck' Breckel	Feature film
2006	Blackjack: At the Gates	Tom Lyndon	TV novie
2006	The Caterpillar Wish	Stephen Knight	Feature film
2005	The Great Raid	Captain Jimmy Fisher	Feature film
2005	Man-Thing	Mike Ploog	TV movie
2004	Small Claims	Todd Fehlers	TV movie
2003	Future Tense	Philip	TV movie
2003	The Policy	Peter Walker	Short film
2003	The Matrix Revolutions	AK	Feature film
2003	Enter the Matrix	AK	Video game
2003	The Matrix Reloaded	AK	Feature film
2002	The Pact	Wilga Roberts	
2001	Echo	Ed	
2001	Jet Set	Frank	
2000	Green Sails	Craig	TV movie
2000	Vertical Limit	Brian Maki	Feature film
1997	Wanted	Su-Ming	
1997	Heaven's Burning	Mahood	Feature film
1996	Cody: Fall from Grace	Fiorelli	TV movie
1996	The Territorians	Terry	TV movie
1996	McLeod's Daughters	Patrick Devlin	TV movie
1996	Offspring	Ben King / Carlo	Feature film
1996	Cody:The Burnout	Fiorelli	TV movie
1994	Cody: Bad Love	Fiorelli	TV movie
1994	Street Fighter	Carlos ‘Charlie’ Blanka	Feature film
1994	Cody: A Family Affair	Fiorelli	TV movie
1994	Cody: The Tip Off	Fiorelli	TV movie
1993	Official Denial	Michael Novado	TV movie
1993	The Flood	Pilot #1	TV movie
1991	When Ships Draw Near	Sailor	Short film
1990	The Crossing	Sam	Feature film
1989	Luigi's Ladies	Tony	Feature film
1989	The Hijacking of the Achille Lauro	Aldo	TV movie

== Theatre ==
Year	Title	Role	Notes
1997	Rosencrantz and Guildenstern are Dead		Comedy Theatre, Melbourne
2009	Baghdad Wedding		Belvoir Street Theatre
