= Graham Kinniburgh =

Australian organised crime figure

- Born: Graham Allen Kinniburgh; 20 October 1942
- Died: 13 December 2003 (aged 61); Kew, Victoria
- Other name: The Munster
- Allegiance: The Carlton Crew

Graham Allen Kinniburgh (20 October 1942 – 13 December 2003) was an Australian organised crime figure from Kew, a suburb of Melbourne. He became a victim of the Melbourne gangland killings, which were dramatised in the drama series Underbelly.

== Early life ==
Kinniburgh's criminal record consisted of charges of wounding with intent to cause murder, escaping legal custody, dishonesty, racketeering, extortion, bribery, possession of firearms, escape, resisting arrest and assaulting police. Kinniburgh met with members of the Moran family while working on Melbourne's waterside. A member of the Painters and Dockers Union, Kinniburgh was one of the most influential gangsters in Australia.

== Death ==
Kinniburgh garnered notoriety for his role in the Melbourne gangland killings. On 13 December 2003, Kinniburgh himself was murdered outside his home in Kew on Belmont Avenue. Two members of a rival criminal gang, or a two-man operation, was suspected of involvement in his death; Carl Williams was questioned, and Andrew Veniamin was treated as a suspect. In 2004, Mick Gatto claimed that Veniamin had implicated himself in Kinniburgh's death prior to himself being killed, but it was later shown that Veniamin had been on the other side of town at the time of the murder. This was deduced by tracking his mobile phone at the time of the murder. However, this in turn has been disputed as a case of the mobile phone and not Veniamin having an alibi. If Veniamin had been one of the two gunmen who killed Kinniburgh, then the identity of the other has never been established.

In November 2015, police charged Stephen John Asling with Kinniburgh's murder alleging that he and Terrence Blewitt were hired to murder Kinniburgh. On 18 March 2017, Asling was found guilty of Kinniburgh's murder.

In 2020 Nicola Gobbo said she had information in one of her notebooks that may help Asling, currently serving a 27 year sentence in Barwon prison. The notes, containing information Gobbo says proves the main witness against Asling was a liar, were seized by police during a raid in 2006 but not provided to Aslings' defence team in response to a request for evidence relating to the case denying them the opportunity to use it to challenge the witness.

== Alphonse Gangitano murder ==
Kinniburgh was a long-term associate of Alphonse Gangitano. On 16 January 1998, Kinniburgh had been drinking with associate, Lou Cozzo, at the Laurel Hotel in Ascot Vale before driving to the home of Alphonse Gangitano.

Kinniburgh left the house shortly after 11 pm to purchase cigarettes from a local store. Upon his return 30 minutes later, Kinniburgh found Gangitano had been shot several times to the head. Gangitano's de facto wife, Virginia, was with the body of her husband who had died in the laundry. Kinniburgh adopted a code of silence, frustrating police investigating the murder. Evidence was presented at an inquest that showed both Kinniburgh and Jason Moran were at the home of Gangitano on the night of his murder. Both were exempted from giving evidence at the inquest on the grounds their evidence may incriminate them. Kinniburgh's blood was discovered at the murder scene and a witness had seen Moran leaving Gangitano's house.

== In television ==
In the drama series Underbelly he is portrayed by actor Gerard Kennedy and also reprises his role in the 2014 direct sequel Fat Tony & Co..

== See also ==
- List of Australian criminals
- Crime in Melbourne
