= Judy Moran =

Australian criminal

- Born: Judith Maryanne Brooks; 18 December 1944 (age 81); Victoria, Australia
- Spouse(s): Leslie John "Johnny" Cole (1963–1982); Lewis Moran (1966–1995)
- Children: Mark Moran (son); Jason Moran (son)
- Status: Incarcerated
- Criminal charge: Murder
- Penalty: 26 years' jail

Judith Maryanne Moran (née Brooks; born 18 December 1944) is the matriarch of the Moran criminal family of Melbourne, Victoria, Australia, involved in the Melbourne gangland killings.

== Personal life ==
Moran was born in Victoria on 18 December 1944. In 1963, she married Leslie John "Johnny" Cole, who was shot dead in Sydney drug-related gangland conflict in 1982. Cole was the father of their son Mark Cole, born in 1964 (later Mark Moran). Judy began a relationship with Lewis Moran in 1966 and was divorced from Cole at the time of his death. Judy and Lewis Moran had a son Jason Moran in 1967. The Morans separated in 1995.

Mark Moran was murdered in 2000, Jason Moran was murdered in 2003, and Lewis Moran was murdered in 2004.

Desmond Moran, Lewis's brother, was murdered in June 2009. Judy Moran was arrested, charged and subsequently convicted of his murder. In 2011, she was sentenced to 26 years prison, with a non-parole period of 21 years.

== Autobiography ==
Just under two weeks after the death of her de facto husband, Lewis Moran, Judy Moran signed with celebrity agent Harry M. Miller and announced that she was planning to write a book of her experiences, intending to "clear her estranged partner's name." The announcement immediately brought criticism: both police and the leader of the Victorian Opposition, Robert Doyle, were reported to be "outraged" at the news, and a victims of crimes group called for new legislation to prevent the book from being published. However, while Victorian law prohibits people convicted of a crime from writing or selling stories about those actions, Judy Moran had never been convicted or charged in relation to her family's activities.

Although the book was delayed in October 2004, it was released in February 2005 as My Story through Random House, and covered her upbringing in Carlton, the murders of her husbands and two sons, and her relationship with other underworld figures. Less than a week later, Random House recalled the book from sale and pulped 20,000 copies after it was revealed that the book contained false allegations in regard to a deceased Victorian detective, Fred Silvester. At the time Random House stated that the book would be reprinted without the false allegations, and the book was reprinted and returned to book stores in May of that year. As of August 2005 over 4,500 copies of the book had been sold.

In 2007, Moran revealed that she was in the process of writing a second book.

== Murder of Desmond Moran ==
On 15 June 2009 Moran's brother-in-law Des Moran (commonly known as "Tuppence") and brother of Lewis, was shot dead in Ascot Vale. On 16 June, Judy Moran and three others were arrested in connection with his murder. Those arrested include 45-year-old Suzanne Kane, sister-in-law of Moran's deceased son Jason Moran and daughter of Painter and Docker Les Kane, an associate of Lewis Moran who was murdered in his family home on 19 October 1978. Moran and Kane were subsequently charged with being an accessory after the fact and Kane's partner, 43-year-old Geoffrey Amour, was arrested in Portland and charged with murder. The fourth person arrested was later released without charge.

At an out-of-sessions bail hearing in the evening of 16 June, police alleged Moran concealed the getaway car in her garage and later disposed of it in Mincha Street, Brunswick. Police had her under surveillance and she was arrested as she walked back to her home. Police discovered a rifle in the abandoned car and white gloves Moran was allegedly seen wearing while driving the car were found discarded in bushes nearby. On executing a warrant on Moran's home, police allegedly discovered a hidden safe containing three hand guns, two stolen Victorian licence plates, a wig and clothing which police claim matches witness descriptions of clothing worn by the gunmen. Moran was remanded into custody on 16 June and later that night her home in Ascot Vale was set on fire in an apparent arson attack.

On 17 June 2009, Moran and Suzanne Kane appeared in the Melbourne Magistrates' Court. Bail was denied on the grounds that their access to weapons represented a danger to the community and remanded them into custody to reappear on 9 September. On 18 September 2009, Kane's partner, Geoffrey Amour, faced Melbourne Magistrates' Court charged with murder. He was also remanded to reappear on 9 September and magistrate Dan Muling granted his lawyer's application for an order suppressing publication of Amour's image. Amour would later plead guilty. He was sentenced on 10 August 2011 to 26 years' jail, with a minimum of 21.

On 9 March 2011, a jury found Judy Moran guilty of murdering Desmond Moran, and was sentenced on 10 August 2011 to 26 years' jail, with a minimum of 21. Suzanne Kane was sentenced on 2 February 2011 to two years' jail, suspended for two years.

== In popular culture ==
Moran was portrayed by Caroline Gillmer in the 2008 TV series Underbelly and in 2012 by Rowena Wallace in true crime documentary TV series Deadly Women. In 2014, Moran was played by Debra Byrne in the miniseries Fat Tony & Co., and she reprised her role in 2017's Underbelly Files: Chopper.
