= Andrew Veniamin =

Australian criminal (1975–2004)

Andrew "Benji" Veniamin
- Born: 16 November 1975; Sunshine, Victoria, Australia
- Died: 23 March 2004 (aged 28); Carlton, Victoria, Australia
- Other name: Benji
- Occupation: Hitman
- Known for: Participant in the Melbourne gangland killings
- Children: 1 daughter
- Status: Deceased
- Allegiance: The Sunshine Crew; The Williams Family
- Convictions: Theft, assault

Sunshine Crew
- Years active: 2000–2004
- Territory: Melbourne
- Ethnicity: Albanians, Greeks, Maltese
- Membership: ca. 12 members
- Activities: Contract killings, drug trafficking
- Allies: Williams Gang, Albanian mafia, Greek mafia
- Rivals: The Carlton Crew, Moran family

Andrew Benjamin (Benji) Veniamin (16 November 1975 – 23 March 2004) was an Australian criminal from Melbourne, Victoria, Australia. A convicted car thief, Veniamin was a key figure in the Melbourne underworld killings, suspected of both murdering seven underworld figures, and being a hit-man for the Williams crime family. Veniamin was killed by Domenic "Mick" Gatto at the La Porcella Italian restaurant in Carlton. Gatto claimed it was in self-defence following a heated argument.

== Early and personal life ==
Veniamin was born to Greek Cypriot immigrant parents, and was raised in the Western Melbourne suburb of Sunshine. From a child to his early teens, Veniamin was an altar boy at the St Andrew's Greek Orthodox Church in the neighbouring suburb of Sunshine West, where his funeral was later held.

Veniamin worked at the West Melbourne wholesale fruit and vegetable market. A few years before his death, Veniamin fathered a daughter as the result of a casual affair.

Prior to his life of crime, Veniamin was an amateur boxer. Trained by Australian Olympic Boxing Coach Beau Gerring, he was to travel to the 1994 Commonwealth Games in Canada to box for Australia. However, when he took part in a robbery on a cigarette truck, those hopes were quashed. His most notable fight was in 1997 against Ben Serranno, in an event organised by the Carlton Crew. He lost the fight, and never fought again.

He was also a known associate of Dino Dibra, who was murdered at his home in October 2000, and of Paul Kallipolitis, who was shot in similar circumstances two years later. Victoria Police say Veniamin was one of the most dangerous and feared men connected to Melbourne's crime scene, and by the time of his death in 2004, they had connected him with several of Melbourne's underworld murders. The church where he was made an altar boy, and where his funeral was held, was also no more than a block away from the Sunshine West house in front of which Dibra was killed.

Veniamin met with Nik Radev on 15 April 2003, the day Radev was murdered, in Coburg. Veniamin associated with an underworld group known as The Carlton Crew; after 2003 he was connected with the Williams Family, and was a close friend of Carl Williams.

== Relationship with Roberta Williams ==
He was a close friend of Carl Williams and his wife Roberta. Although Roberta had previously rejected claims she and Veniamin were intimate, in early 2009 she admitted that he was her soulmate. She said that every Tuesday he would pick her daughters up and take them to religion classes, bring them home and give them a bath. He said his favourite day of the week was Tuesday and Roberta said her younger daughter, Dhakota, idolised him.

== Death ==
Veniamin died in the La Porcella restaurant in Carlton on 23 March 2004 at around 2.30pm after being shot by former associate Domenic "Mick" Gatto. Gatto was charged with his murder but acquitted on self-defence grounds.

During the trial, Gatto claimed Veniamin had pulled out a .38 pistol and threatened to kill him, when they were together in an enclosed area at the back of the restaurant. There were no witnesses. Gatto claims Veniamin lost his temper after being told that "he'd rather [Veniamin] not come around near [Gatto's group of friends] at all", that Veniamin drew a gun and that during a struggle he was able to turn the gun around on Veniamin and fire one shot into his neck, and one shot into the eye. Gatto also claimed that before Veniamin lost his temper, Veniamin had implicated himself in the deaths of Dino Dibra, Paul Kallipolitis and Graham Kinniburgh; he is also believed to have killed underworld figure Victor Peirce. His funeral was held at the Greek Orthodox Church in Sunshine West, in western Melbourne, the same church where he had been an altar boy.

== In popular culture ==
In the first season of drama series Underbelly, Veniamin was portrayed by actor Damian Walshe-Howling.
