= Lewis Caine =

Australian criminal (1965–2004)

- Born: 22 April 1965
- Died: 8 May 2004 (aged 39); Brunswick, Victoria, Australia
- Other name: Sean Vincent
- Status: Deceased (homicide by firearm)
- Conviction: Murder
- Criminal charge: Murder
- Penalty: 15 years imprisonment 10-year non-parole period

Lewis Caine (22 April 1965 – 8 May 2004), also known by the alias Sean Vincent was an Australian organised crime figure who was murdered on 8 May 2004 during the Melbourne gangland killings.

He was a self-proclaimed martial arts expert, but this was disputed by the police.

== Murder of David Templeton ==
Caine was convicted of the murder of David Templeton outside Lazars nightclub in King Street, Melbourne, in 1988 and was released from prison in June 2000 after serving 10 years of his 15-year sentence.

== Zarah Garde-Wilson ==
Caine was the de facto husband of lawyer Zarah Garde-Wilson at the time of Caine's murder. The couple had lived together for a period of approximately two and a half years before his death. The pair had met while Garde-Wilson was employed with a Melbourne-based law firm and was representing Caine on drunk driving charges.

== Murder ==
On 8 May 2004, Evangelos Goussis and associate Keith Faure travelled to Melbourne from Geelong to meet with Caine at the Plough and Harrow Hotel in Carlton at the invitation of Faure.

Caine's body was found with a single gunshot wound to his head in Katawa Grove, Brunswick, at approximately 11 pm the same night. Caine had been seen dining with convicted murderer and drug importer Carl Williams and his wife Roberta at Melbourne's Windows Restaurant on the night before his murder.

On 19 May 2004, heavily armed members of the Victoria Police Special Operations Group arrested Goussis and Faure in relation to Caine's murder while the pair were walking alongside Geelong's Bay City Plaza shopping centre. Goussis and associate Faure were later convicted of Caine's murder.

== Portrayals ==
Caine was portrayed by Marcus Graham in the television series Underbelly.
