= Charles Hegyalji =

Hungarian born gangland criminal in Melbourne, Australia

- Born: Charlie Peter Hegyaljie; 6 August 1956
- Died: 22 November 1998 (aged 42)
- Other name: Mad Charlie
- Known for: Murder victim

Charles Hegyalji (6 August 1956 – 22 November 1998) also known as Mad Charlie was a Hungarian-born gangland criminal in Melbourne, Australia.

Hegyalji was a key figure in the amphetamine trade. He was charged with attempted murder in 1997 after a gun battle with another criminal associate and subsequently kept in custody for twelve months. Charges were dropped after witnesses refused to testify.

Hegyalji was murdered within months of his release. He was one of a large number of criminals murdered by other criminals who were killed during the Melbourne gangland killings. A major suspect in Hegyali's murder was fellow criminal Dino Dibra.

Hegyalji was best friend of celebrity criminal and convicted standover man Mark "Chopper" Read, whom he had contacted several days before his murder. Hegyalji is buried in Springvale Botanical Cemetery.
