= Melbourne gangland killings =

Series of murders in Melbourne, Victoria, Australia

Melbourne gangs war
Date	1998- 2010
Location	Melbourne

Belligerents
Honored Society	Carlton Crew, Moran family, Pettingill family, Radev Gang	Williams Gang, Sunshine Crew, Mokbel Network

Casualties and losses
- 36 casualties

The Melbourne gangland killings were the murders of 36 underworld figures in Melbourne, Victoria, Australia, between January 1998 and August 2010. The murders and battle were retributive killings involving underworld groups. The deaths caused a power vacuum within Melbourne's criminal community, and rival factions battled for control and influence. Many of the murders remain unsolved, although detectives from the Purana Taskforce believe that Carl Williams was responsible for at least 10 of them. The period culminated in the arrest of Williams, who pleaded guilty on 28 February 2007 to three of the murders.

Since the confession of Williams, the ultimate source of the violence has become public knowledge. On his 29th birthday, while meeting with Jason Moran and his half brother Mark Moran on 13 October 1999 at a suburban park in Gladstone Park, Jason Moran shot Carl Williams in the stomach over a dispute about money relating to their amphetamine trade. Through the period after his run-in with the Moran family, Williams commenced a war with the aim of killing all members of the 'Carlton Crew'.

The murder of former lawyer Mario Condello on 6 February 2006 caused speculation about a possible resurgence in the killings, although this was denied by police.

On 19 April 2010, Carl Williams was murdered by fellow inmate Matthew Johnson while incarcerated at Barwon Prison. Williams would have been 71 before becoming eligible for parole.

== Background ==
The majority of underworld crime figures and major incidents can be traced back to the Painters and Dockers Union that existed on Melbourne's waterfront after World War II. The union had a mafia-like structure, and most criminal activity was centred around control of the Union, and the cut associated with the drugs (primarily heroin and cocaine) that passed through the port. The Melbourne Markets was used as a distribution point for the illegal drugs, because of its close proximity to the docks.

By 1990 the local manufacture of amphetamines had increased to the point where the police described Melbourne as the "amphetamine capital of Australia". As well as drug dealing, criminals received income through protection rackets in King Street nightclubs, as well as in prostitution, illegal gambling, and armed robbery.

The genesis of the underworld conflict can be traced to the 1996 arrest of John Higgs, then Australia's number one trafficker of amphetamines. Higgs was a well-connected criminal with a wide network of contacts both in the underworld and among corrupt police, and it took several years in one of the country's most expensive criminal investigations to finally convict him of drug trafficking charges. The case was controversial and included a major cache of drugs linked to Higgs and his syndicate mysteriously vanishing in the storage depots of Melbourne's drug squad, almost certainly thanks to corrupt police involvement. The downfall of Higgs and his closest associates meant younger criminals became keen to enter the drug trade and fill the vacuum left by Higgs' arrest. This included underworld figures such as Jason Moran and Carl Williams who would become key figures in the Melbourne gangland killings.

The catalyst that ignited the conflict was the 1998 murders of Melbourne gangsters Alphonse Gangitano, shot dead in his own home on 16 January 1998, and Charles Hegyalji known as "Mad Charlie", murdered in front of his house on 23 November of that same year. Both Gangitano and Hegyalji had been major figures in the Melbourne underworld, and Gangitano in particular had been a close ally of Higgs. Following these two deaths many of Gangitano and Hegyalji's former associates suddenly rose to positions of importance in the underworld, and it was several of these figures, such as Vince Mannella and Dimitrios Belias, who became the next victims in Melbourne's underworld war as the fight for power escalated. The conflict was further exacerbated by the 1999 shooting of Carl Williams, who was shot in the stomach by the Moran brothers, Jason and Mark, over a drug-related debt. Williams, who survived the shooting, vowed to exterminate the Moran family and in doing so became the most infamous criminal involved in the killings, as he arranged the murders of most of the Moran family and several of their allies in the Carlton Crew.

=== Groups and factions ===
The following groups of people were connected to the murders. A number of those named below were members of more than one group at the same time.

The Honoured Society
A Calabrian 'Ndrangheta group that has long been linked with control of Melbourne's fruit and vegetable markets.

The Painters and Dockers / Moran family
A loose association of Irish waterfront workers and ex-members of the Painters and Dockers Union. Brian, Les & Ray Kane, Graham Kinniburgh, Victor Peirce, and Lewis, Mark, and Jason Moran were all associated with 'the Dockers'. The Moran family operated jointly with the mostly Italian Carlton Crew.

The Carlton Crew
An independent 'Ndrangheta group created by Alphonse Gangitano. Domenic "Mick" Gatto and Mario Condello were also members. Gatto succeeded Gangitano as leader of the organisation after the latter's death in 1998.

Radev Gang
Led by Nikolai "The Russian" Radev, a convicted drug dealer and career criminal who was shot in Queen Street, Coburg in 2003. No killer has been formally identified, although several possibles have been named.

The Sunshine Crew
Led by Paul "PK" Kallipolitis. Dino Dibra, Andrew "Benji" Veniamin, Rocco Arico, Mark Mallia, Bluey Watkins, Johnny Auciello, Mark Morrison, Michael Dewhirst, Terrence Chimmiri and Jason Kontek were also known associates. All had been friends since childhood. Veniamin took over the group after Kallipolitis was murdered; Veniamin was himself assassinated in 2004.
The Williams Syndicate
Led by Carl Williams, and his father, George Williams. Antonios Mokbel, Andrew Veniamin, and Dino Dibra were known associates.
Pettingill family
Melbourne based criminal family involved in drug trafficking, arms dealing, armed robbery, pimping. Led by Kath Pettingill.

== Investigation ==
The Purana Task Force was established by Victoria Chief Commissioner of Police Christine Nixon in 2003 to investigate the Melbourne gangland killings and major drug syndicates. The taskforce enjoyed success in investigating and halting the killings, despite initially being pushed for staff. In 2008, following the halt in killings, the purview of the task force was expanded.

Investigations were initially hampered by a "code of silence", with few organised crime figures willing to risk their lives to provide details to state and federal authorities but they were able to cultivate informers and protected witnesses from within the criminal community although Victoria's state police have lamented the death of gang figures who were killed before they were able to aid their investigation. The use of one of those informers, barrister Nicola Gobbo, led to multiple court cases including the High Court of Australia decision AB v CD, a Royal Commission and placing hundreds of convictions in doubt.

During the existence of the Purana taskforce it was led by a number of different officers including:

- Jim O'Brien
- Andrew Gustke

In the first three years of the Purana taskforce

- 316 people were investigated
- 6,000 hours of recordings were made from 328,000 telephone conversations
- 39 tracking devices were used which helped the taskforce spend 22,000 hours following suspects

These efforts helped taskforce Purana which was praised for their efforts to stop the killings.

Detective Inspector Andrew Gustke was head of the taskforce in 2016 and stated that if groups like Purana were successful then there would be a reduction in the level of general crime. At the same time it was announced that they would begin investigating firearms trafficking which had caused an increase in shootings in Melbourne. Gustke also wanted international taskforces to be set up to stop drug trafficking before it reaches Australia.

In 2019 it was revealed that, in 2006, Purana detectives hid from the court the fact that they paid money into the prison account of a crown witness. The Court of Appeal ruled this to be a miscarriage of justice and quashed the conviction.

The Purana taskforce was closed after a 2021 review found that the taskforce had achieved what it was set up to do, but a change was required to enable detectives to respond more quickly to changing threats, with a spokesperson saying that whilst "highly successful during this time, the criminal landscape has changed significantly since its inception, which is why we have recommended the operation closes". Whilst the taskforce was in operation it was responsible for the laying of charges in 15 murders with 11 convictions, as well as intervening to prevent six murders. It also seized $70 million in assets information and assisted the Australian Taxation Office in issuing around 1,000 tax demand notices which recouped more than $15 million.

== Timeline of events ==
=== 1995 ===
- 7 February 1995 – Greg Workman shot dead by Alphonse Gangitano over a $50,000 debt in Wando Grove, St Kilda.

=== 1996 ===
- 15 August 1996 – Tim Richards and Les Knowles, two mechanics who also dealt in drugs, were shot dead in their auto-shop by Gerald David Preston. A third mechanic, Kym Traeger, was wounded but survived. The killing was related to drugs and is believed to have been ordered by the Hell's Angel outlaw motorcycle club, of which Preston was an associate. Preston was convicted in 1998 and given a life sentence with a 32-year non-parole period, and the driver for the murder, Kevin Wayne Gillard, was also given a life sentence.

=== 1997 ===
- 20 April 1997 – George Marcus was shot six times in Box Hill North, as he was visiting his partner's home. Marcus, suspected of running a massive counterfeit ring, was involved in foreign business deals in Lebanon and Saudi Arabia, and was connected to the Chaouk crime family in Melbourne. Marcus was shot dead by two gunmen in front of the house's garage, and the killers then sped away in a late-model Holden Commodore or Ford. Police found fake cheques worth between $30,000 and $250,000 in Marcus's briefcase, for a total of more than $16.65 million. Marcus was also suspected of being an informant for the Australian Federal Police. In his books, Chopper Read alleged police involvement in the murder of George Marcus.

=== 1998 ===
- 16 January 1998 – The Melbourne gangland killings are believed to have begun with the murder of 40-year-old Alphonse Gangitano. He was shot and killed in the laundry of his own home, while wearing only his underwear. A coroner's report into his death directly implicated Jason Moran and Graham Kinniburgh. They were both found to be in Gangitano's home in Templestowe when the murder took place; however, it could not be established who pulled the trigger. Kinniburgh's blood was found on a banister inside the house, and his skin was found on a dent on the front security door. Both were excused from giving evidence to the coroner on the grounds they might incriminate themselves. It is widely believed that Jason Moran was the one who shot Gangitano.
- 3 August 1998 – John Furlan, a 48-year-old motor mechanic from Coburg, was killed by a car bomb in his Subaru Liberty in Lorensen Avenue, Merlynston. Domenic "Mick" Gatto was initially treated as a suspect since he had been involved in a payment dispute with the deceased; however, no one has been arrested in connection with his death.
- 23 November 1998 – 42-year-old stand-over man Charles Hegyalji, known as "Mad Charlie", was killed at his Caulfield home. He was an acquaintance of Chopper Read and had been associated with the amphetamine industry.

=== 1999 ===
- 9 January 1999 – Vince Mannella, a former associate of Victor Peirce and Alphonse Gangitano, was ambushed and killed outside his home in Fitzroy North in the evening. Media suspected his death was debt-related or part of an underworld power struggle but no suspects were ever named.
- 21 February 1999 – Phong Dui Nguyen, a heroin dealer, was shot six times with a .357 magnum as he exited his car on Gray Street, Yarraville. The gunman was Tom Scarborough, a major Melbourne heroin trafficker.
- 24 February 1999 – Damian Catania was the victim of a drive-by shooting at about 6.00 am. Catania was waiting outside his home in Hoppers Crossing in Melbourne's western suburbs for a regular lift to work when a white Holden Commodore slowed as it cruised by. A gunman in the car, (suspected to be Andrew Veniamin) opened fire, hitting Catania at least four times in the legs and groin. Catania, a mid-level "player" in the underworld was an ex-boxer who had a string of minor convictions, mostly for violence. Catania almost lost a leg as a result of the shooting and spent 12 months in hospital recovering. Those in the car were never caught. On Monday 22 May 2006 Catania, then 30, was sentenced to a minimum of six years jail for pouring petrol over a man who had annoyed him and setting the victim alight, causing horrific burns. Catania told the court that on his eventual release from jail, he wanted to "pack up and travel out of Melbourne".
- 28 May 1999 – Joseph Quadara, a 57-year-old greengrocer, was ambushed by two people and killed in a Toorak carpark in the early hours as he was about to start work at a Safeway supermarket. The former millionaire was declared bankrupt in 1994. Police believed that his killing was a horrible case of mistaken identity, due to the existence of another Giuseppe "Joe" Quadara involved in Melbourne's fruit and vegetable industry with underworld connections, although Joe himself had connections to the Melbourne's fruit and vegetable markets and it is conspired that the Markets God-Father; Frank Benevenuto hired Andrew "Benji" Veniamin to perform the hit.
- 12 June 1999 - Vicki Jacobs who previously testified against her husband Gerald David Preston in the murder of Tim Richards and Les Knowles was shot dead in her home.
- 9 September 1999 – 38-year-old Brighton businessman Dimitrios Belias was killed with a single shot to the back of the head in an underground carpark on St Kilda road. He had been an associate of Charles Hegyalji and was believed to be heavily in debt. In 2002, a coroner reported that Belias had been trying to use fake diamonds to clear his underworld debts. Police have posted a $100,000 reward for information leading to apprehending Belias's killers. On 22 December 2011, Michael John Henderson was sentenced to 7 and a half years in prison for having stolen more than a million dollars through a fraud scheme, in an effort to help settle the debt owed by Belias prior to his murder.
- 14 September 1999 – 47-year-old criminal Milorad Dapcevic, a friend and business associate of Belias, was last seen alive on the night that he made a statement in the police station at St Kilda Road. He had prior criminal convictions for armed robbery and was suspected to be involved in heroin trafficking prior to his disappearance. He has never been found, and as of 2014 police investigators believed he had been murdered, possibly by the same people that killed Dimitrios Belias.
- 13 October 1999 – Drug dealer Carl Williams, who was 29 at the time, was shot in the stomach and survived in Gladstone Park. Williams told the police he blacked out and could not identify the shooter. Known underworld figures Mark and Jason Moran were present at the time, and police believe there was a dispute related to a failed amphetamines batch and ownership of a pill press. A woman told police she heard a man cry "No, Jason!" moments before a shot was fired.
- 20 October 1999 – Vince Mannella's brother, 31-year-old Gerardo Mannella, was ambushed and killed outside his brother's home, after attempting to flee from two men. The killers of Mannella are also believed to have shot his brother Vince as well as Dimirtrios Belias.
- 25 November 1999 – George and Carl Williams were charged with multiple drug offences after police raided an alleged amphetamine factory in Broadmeadows. Police seized around 25,000 amphetamine tablets, a pill press, a loaded pistol and 6.95 kg of powders containing methamphetamine, ketamine, and pseudoephedrine with a street value up to A$20 million. These charges were never brought to trial because of corruption allegations against former drug squad detectives involved in the raid.

=== 2000–2002 ===
- 8 May 2000 – 52-year-old fruiterer Francesco "Frank" Benvenuto, was fatally shot while sitting in his car in the driveway of his Beaumaris home. Benvenuto was a major underworld figure in Melbourne and the son of Liborio Benvenuto (died 1988), considered to be at one time the "Godfather" of the city's mafia. Phone records show that as Benvenuto lay dying he managed to ring ex-employee and associate Victor Peirce on his mobile phone. Mick Gatto was suspected by some to have ordered the assassination, whereas others suggested the murder could be retribution for the death of Alfonso Muratore, a high ranking Mafia member shot dead on 4 August 1992. Police initially treated Gatto as a suspect but later offered a $100,000 reward for information leading to an arrest. Mark Moran and Andrew Veniamin were later named as chief suspects.
- 16 May 2000 – Richard Mladenich, a 39-year-old parolee, career criminal, and associate of Mark Moran, was killed with a single bullet in the St Kilda Esquire Hotel. He had recently been released from jail where he once shared a cell with Chopper Read. Police named Rocco Arico as a suspect but were unable to interview him whilst he was in prison. They later named Dino Dibra as their primary suspect Mark Moran was also named as a suspect. It has also been reported that Carl Williams was the getaway driver.
- 15 June 2000 – Mark Moran (then 35 years old) was shot and killed by Carl Williams as he was getting out of his white Holden Ute outside his luxury home in Aberfeldie. Moran's murder was initially thought of as retribution for the death of Frank Benvenuto. Some underworld rumours suspected Rodney "The Duke" Collins as one of his killers. Dino Dibra and Rocco Arico were also thought to have carried out the killing. Mark Moran had been under close police surveillance but the surveillance was mysteriously switched off hours before he was shot dead.
- 14 October 2000 – Dino Dibra (25) was killed after leaving his house in Sunshine West. At the time he was facing charges relating to kidnap and assault. At a police press conference, Detective Inspector Andrew Allen said "We are confident that this gunman is a hired hitman and that he, along with another person, ambushed Mr Dibra that night about 9:16 pm and shot him a number of times ... this is not the only murder (the gunman) has committed". This police profile strongly suggested that 'Benji' Veniamin was one of the gunmen. A $100,000 reward was offered by police for information.
- 22 March 2001 – 41 year-old George Germanos, a part-time security guard and nightclub bouncer was found with three bullets in his head and one in his chest at an Armadale Park. Germanos had been fearing for his life, and only two weeks prior to his murder he had tried to borrow $5,000 from a relative in order to purchase a handgun. It is stated that the reason for his killing had to do with an incident where he bashed Ray Mather, son of prominent underworld figure Robert "Bluey Bob" Mather, at a St Kilda nightclub on October 21, 2000. Robert Mather and his gang were believed to be involved in a series of vicious armed robberies as well as considered suspects in the shooting of Dimitrios Belias in 1999, and the murder of Maryanna Lanciana, wife of convicted bank robber Pasquale 'Percy' Lanciana, who was shot dead in her home in 1984. Robert Mather remained a person of interest to police for the three murders but he died of natural causes in 2014.
- 1 May 2002 – 43-year-old Victor Peirce was killed while in a car parked opposite the Coles supermarket in Bay Street, Port Melbourne. A white Holden Commodore pulled up beside Peirce, who exchanged words with the occupants inside the car before being shot four times at close range. Although Pierce was officially employed as a waterfront worker, police believed he was the leader of various drug syndicates in Melbourne and heavily involved with drug trafficking. Peirce was considered a true underworld heavy-weight; he was born into the notorious Pettingill family. It is suspected that this contract killing was organised by Mick Gatto and Vince Benvenuto and executed by Andrew Veniamin; Faruk Orman was initially convicted of the murder, but was acquitted in 2019.
- 10 July 2002 – Alexander Kudryavstev was shot by Michael Goldman. Goldman, 55, said he shot to miss a wounded acquaintance on a suburban nature strip despite orders from psychotic criminal, Nik Radev to "finish him". Goldman said he was "under the gun" and terrified of Radev. Goldman lured Kudryavstev to his Hampton flat and told a Supreme Court jury he was acting like a robot when he shot Kudryavstev in the stomach at the flat. He said Radev told him earlier the same day: "Give him one in the head and I take care of the body." Goldman, of Highett Road, plead not guilty to the attempted murder of Kudryavstev. The jury heard Kudryavstev, a police informer, was wearing a concealed tape recorder when shot in the abdomen and in the head. He secretly recorded his terrifying brush with death. Goldman shot Kudryavstev in the abdomen as he greeted him at the front door. Kudryavstev said he moved his head when Goldman fired at him on a nature strip near Highett Road. Goldman denied during cross-examination that he knew at the time Kudryavstev was a police informer. He said an angry Radev wanted to meet Mr Kudryavstev over a burglary at a friend's warehouse. On 27 May 2004, Goldman was jailed for 14 years. Supreme Court judge Justice Robert Redlich ordered Goldman to serve a minimum non-parole term of 11 years. "Your anger and desire to kill him (Mr Kudryavstev) is evident on listening to the tape recording," said the judge.
- 16 October 2002 – 31 year old drug dealer Paul Kallipolitis was shot dead in his Sunshine West home. He was lying on his bed and had one gunshot wound to the head. Police publicly suspected that his friend Andrew Veniamin was the killer. Veniamin and Kallipolitis had been friends for many years, since they were kids. Kallipolitis shot and killed a man in Deer Park almost a decade earlier after having a gun pulled on him. Angelo Mario Venditti was arrested for this murder on 29 July 2008.
- 28 December 2002 – At approximately 8:30 a.m., while under police surveillance, Mark Anthony Smith, returned to his home after dropping his daughter off at work. Smith parked the car, and as he was getting out was shot in the neck and hand in the driveway of his Keilor home. Recognising the gunmen, Smith sprinted after the shooter, Victor Brincat, but upon realising he was losing a lot of blood, turned back to wait for medical assistance. A convicted murderer, he had been sentenced to 13 years in prison for the murder of a man, John Anset, who was undertaking community service at the local high school in Craigieburn during 1987. Rumours surfaced that the hit against Smith was ordered after he accepted the job to kill Jason Moran. But instead of shooting Jason, he went halves in the cash with Moran. Victor Brincat, after turning on his crew and becoming an informant, revealed that Carl Williams had ordered the killing and had not paid him for the hits that had already taken place. Smith survived the assassination attempt, subsequently moving his family to Queensland and away from the violence before returning to Melbourne.

=== 2003 ===
- 15 April 2003 – 44-year-old Nik Radev, known as "The Bulgarian" (alternately reported as "The Russian" by media outlets, though he was never known by this name. This is suspected to be due to Russia's known links to underworld figures.), was killed in Queen Street Coburg. The known drug dealer and standover man was shot seven times in the head and chest as he sat in his Mercedes-Benz coupé. Victoria Police told The Age that they believed his death was planned by a father and son drug manufacturing team, and a hitman suspected of four other murders carried out the killing in a red sedan. Andrew Veniamin met Radev on the day of the murder and unambiguously fitted the police description of the prime suspect, along with George and Carl Williams. Radev had been warned that he was a marked man but ignored the warnings refusing to believe his friends would turn on him. Damien Cossu and Alfonso Traglia were with Radev at the time of the murder but claimed they could not identify the gunman, and were subsequently named by police as 'persons of interest'
- June 2003 – Taskforce Purana was set up by Victoria Police Assistant Commissioner Simon Overland to investigate Melbourne's underworld.
- 4 June 2003 – 28-year-old male prostitute Shane Chartres-Abbott was fatally shot outside his Reservoir home on his way to a County Court trial for raping and bashing a female client in 2002. In 2007, underworld assassin Keith Faure (known as JP) confessed to this murder and said two corrupt detectives were linked to the murder. The murder sparked a media frenzy. The Briars Task Force was formed to investigate the murder.
- 21 June 2003 – 35-year-old Jason Moran, and his minder, 40-year-old Pasquale Barbaro were fatally shot as they sat in a parked blue van outside an Auskick football clinic in Essendon. Five children were witness to the murder including Moran's six-year-old twin boy and girl. The gunman Victor Brincat ran away across the football oval and over a Moonee Ponds Creek footbridge to a waiting vehicle containing Thomas Hentschel.
- 21 July 2003 – 39-year-old major drug dealer Willie Thompson was killed while sitting in his car after leaving a mixed martial arts club in Chadstone. He had been a close associate of the Moran family. Police say the gunman strolled up to the car and shot Thompson dead before escaping with a second person in a stolen Ford sedan. Some bullets were lodged in nearby shops. Thompson's official occupation was a lollipop vendor inside nightclubs, and a police report said he had recently developed an enmity with Nik Radev. In many rumours Hizir Ferman and Robert Musso are thought to have done this shooting. According to criminals turned testifying witnesses, Carl Williams ordered the death of Thompson to steal a large quantity of drug chemicals from him.
- 18 August 2003 – 36-year-old Mark Mallia's burnt body was found in a suburban storm drain packed inside a green wheelie-bin. Before his murder, Mallia was kidnapped by drug-boss Carl Williams and a team of 7 men (including Benji Veniamin, Damien Cossu, Chris Orfandis, Hizir Ferman and Alfonso Traglia), the seven men took Mallia back to a warehouse where they tortured him into confessing where some laundered money was buried. Little details are known if the torture was successful or not, but not long after Mark Mallia was murdered.
- 9 September 2003 – 32-year-old Housom Zayat was run off the road, forced from his car and repeatedly shot in the head before being found in a paddock in Tarneit with multiple bullet wounds. Zayat was also a close associate of Nik Radev. Nicholas Ibrahim charged with his murder.
- 20 October 2003 – 49-year-old Istvan "Steve" Gulyas and his de facto wife were found executed in their Sunbury home. Together they ran a dating agency, Partner Search Australia, which police suspected was a front for a brothel. Gulyas was also a friend of Nik Radev.
- 25 October 2003 – 38-year-old Michael Ronald Marshall was shot four times in the head outside his luxury South Yarra home in front of his five-year-old son. He was a hot-dog salesman but also sold ecstasy at the street level. He had been suspected by some, including major crime lord Tony Mokbel, of being the one responsible for Willie Thompson's death. Carl Williams, eager to frame Marshall for the Thompson killing, ordered his murder. Victor Brincat and Thomas Hentschel were convicted of killing Michael Marshall. The killing became controversial as Brincat and Hentschel had actually been closely followed and monitored by police, who however at the last minute could not or would not prevent Marshall's murder.
- 17 November 2003 – Carl Williams was arrested and charged with making threats to kill a Purana Taskforce detective and the investigator's girlfriend. The alleged threats were made in a taped phone conversation to Victor Brincat in Barwon Prison. Carl was bailed two weeks later. The arrest was dramatically captured on film by The Age photographer Angela Wylie.
- 13 December 2003 – 61-year-old Graham Kinniburgh, known as "The Munster", was ambushed and shot outside his home in Kew just after midnight. Police said he had been killed in front of family members soon after parking his car. Kinniburgh was carrying a gun and managed to return one shot before being killed. He was considered Melbourne's most influential criminal at the time of his death. Kinniburgh was also a ring leader in the notorious Drill-bit gang that specialised in safe breaking. Mick Gatto was a pallbearer at his funeral, Lewis Moran and many other underworld figures also attended. Andrew Veniamin was treated as a suspect in his murder, and Carl Williams was also questioned. Stephen John Asling was charged with The Munster's murder in 2015.

=== 2004 ===
- February 2004 – Carl Williams went on the record with the news magazine The Bulletin with a denial that he had paid Andrew “Benji" Veniamin A$100,000 for five of the murders.
- March 2004 – Federal Justice Minister Chris Ellison announced the Australian Crime Commission would be investigating the murders.
- 23 March 2004 – Andrew Veniamin (28) was fatally shot by Mick Gatto in the Carlton pizza restaurant "La Porcella" after an argument. Gatto was arrested and charged with his murder, with police alleging that Gatto had set a trap for Veniamin. Veniamin was a close associate of Carl Williams and was suspected of being a hitman involved in as many as seven underworld murders. Gatto was later acquitted on the grounds of self-defence.
- 31 March 2004 – Lewis Moran (62), father of Jason Moran and stepfather of Mark Moran, was shot and killed in broad daylight by two balaclava-clad men in the front bar of the Brunswick Club in Brunswick. Lewis had only recently been released on bail for drug trafficking charges, and police had warned him that his life was in danger. His close friend and fellow Painter and Docker, Bert Wrout, sustained injuries but survived. Graham Kinniburgh and Lewis Moran were notorious for their work on the Melbourne docks. It was later proven that Carl Williams paid for the hit and known hard-man Keith Faure was the driver. His brother Noel Faure and Evangelos Goussis were the executioners.
- 12 April 2004 – Terrence Blewitt, a hitman connected with the Williams syndicate, and believed to be the one who shot Graham Kinniburgh in 2003, disappeared without a trace. He was last seen walking towards a blue Hyundai Excel, the same car model that was used as a getaway car in the Kinniburgh murder. His remains were found over a decade later during a search of a scrapyard in Pelmet Crescent, Thomastown in Melbourne's north with tests determining that he had been shot.
- 8 May 2004 – The body of Lewis Caine was found dumped in Brunswick, after being shot at close range with a shotgun. He was a friend of Carl Williams and had been seen dining with him two nights earlier. This murder was a paid hit by Mario Condello, allegedly in reprisal for the killing of Lewis Moran. In May 2008, Evangelos Goussis was convicted of killing Lewis Moran in March 2004. Goussis was sentenced to a minimum of 15 years for the Caine murder, and in February 2009 he was sentenced to life in prison for the Moran killing. He will be eligible for parole in 2039.
- 16 May 2004 – Terrence and Christine Hodson were found executed in their home in Kew. Terrence Hodson was revealed to be a police informant. A week before the bodies were found ABC radio reported that a leaked document revealing Hodson as an informant was doing the rounds in certain underworld circles. It is also reported that an associate of Lewis Moran hired Hodson to murder Carl Williams in 2001. Police drug squad detective Paul Dale allegedly paid Carl Williams $150,000 to organise the hit, who used gunman Rodney "The Duke" Collins for the murders.
- 9 June 2004 – Purana Taskforce detectives arrested Carl Williams for conspiracy to murder. His associates Sean Sonnet and Gregg Hildebrandt were arrested only metres from the home of Mario Condello. Victoria Police said the raids had "absolutely" saved Mario Condello from becoming the 28th gangland victim.

=== 2006 ===
- 6 February 2006 – On the eve of his murder trial, Mario Condello was shot and killed in his driveway at around 10 pm. Condello had dined with Mick Gatto earlier that night and police warned Gatto that he was under increased risk as this was possibly the resumption of the gangland war. The killer is known to police as Rodney "The Duke" Collins.
- 20 March 2006 – Melbourne business man Tony Mokbel failed to appear in Court during his trial for the importation of cocaine from Mexico in 2000. Mokbel had been granted bail by Magistrate Phillip Goldberg, despite protests from Police. Goldberg had previously dismissed drug cases brought against Mokbel and his brother. A warrant was issued for his arrest, but Mokbel had not been seen since 5 pm on 19 March 2006. His defence team feared for his life. The week before this date, Mokbel raised concerns for his safety, after an incident not related to this case. He was eventually arrested by Greek police in Athens, Greece on 5 June 2007. Mokbel was successfully extradited to Australia on 17 May 2008.
- 26 March 2006 – Lee Patrick Torney's body was found dumped down a mineshaft. He was a violent Melbourne criminal and drug trafficker connected to the Williams family and suspected of being involved in several murders, including the 1982 shooting of his former associate Sidney James Graham. Torney had been killed several months earlier with a shovel by Graham John Holden, following an argument.
- 27 April 2006 - 31-year-old Michael Phillip Dewhirst died after being stabbed following an altercation with two other men in Palmerston St, Melton. Dewhirst had been a close associate of Dino Dibra, Andrew Veniamin and Paul Kallipolitis, all of whom had previously been murdered in the gangland war. He had been present at the 1998 Dome nightclub shooting in Prahran, where two bouncers were shot, with Dibra and Dewhirst being suspects in the attack. A day after Dewhirst's death, Craig Vella was arrested for the fatal stabbing.
- 14 October 2006 – Michael "Eyes" Pastras was shot once in the buttocks and once in the thigh at a house in Albion St, Brunswick. Pastras gave evidence at Mick Gatto's murder trial that he spoke to Andrew Veniamin on 23 March 2004, the day Veniamin was killed by Gatto. He said that Veniamin never mentioned anything to him about wanting to harm Mr Gatto. But after testifying, he approached the Purana gangland killing taskforce and made a statement refuting what he said in the witness box. Pastras told Purana detectives he saw Veniamin with a gun when he went to meet Mr Gatto in Carlton's La Porchetta restaurant and that Veniamin told him he wanted Mr Gatto dead. He claimed Veniamin told him: "I'm fucking dirty on Mick Gatto. He's gotta go." That evidence was not presented to the jury in the Gatto murder trial. Pastras was named in a confidential Victoria Police document that was blamed for prompting the executions of police informer Terrence Hodson and his wife, Christine in 2004. It contained details of what Hodson told police and was leaked to Melbourne's underworld shortly before the Hodsons were fatally shot in their Kew home in 2004. His brother Savas Pastras was an associate of Lewis Moran. Pastras, 39, turned up at Moran's Essendon unit on 25 October 2002, not knowing police were inside raiding it. One of the detectives asked Moran's partner, Virginia Strazdas, who was the man walking up the driveway, and she said he was a friend. Moran's partner ignored a police command not to warn the man and managed to slightly open the door and tell him to go away. A detective, Senior Constable Victor Anastasiadis, said he opened the door, recognised Pastras and said, "Sav, come in." He was taken into Moran's house and a search discovered he had $44,000 in $100 and $50 notes hidden under his jacket in a green plastic bag. After removing the bag, Pastras hunched over and began to shake, he said. Detective Senior Sergeant Marty Allison told the court that Pastras had a look of shock and horror on his face when police confronted him. "He looked as though he had seen a ghost; he couldn't speak. He opened his mouth but words weren't coming out," Senior Sergeant Allison said. Forensic tests revealed the cash showed traces of heroin and cocaine. Savas Pastras was charged with possessing the proceeds of crime. Police alleged the $44,000 was to be paid to Lewis Moran to settle a drug debt. Pastras's lawyer, Stephen Shirrefs, SC, told the court that the warrant used to conduct the raid on Moran's home was illegal. "The search of Mr Pastras and the seizure of the money on him only arose because he was invited into the house by police," Shirrefs said. He said the money could not be deemed proceeds of crime because Moran had not touched the cash and police said it was related to a drug deal "purported to have occurred". Magistrate Ann Collins ruled in April 2004 that Savas Pastras had no case to answer because police could not prove the money was derived from a crime. Collins cleared Pastras in the Broadmeadows Magistrates Court after finding that police could not prove that the money, stashed in a green plastic shopping bag, had anything to do with the sale of drugs. She also found that police could not prove that traces of heroin and cocaine found on the cash did not come from other sources.

=== 2009 ===
- 15 June 2009 – Underworld identity Desmond Moran was shot and killed at Ascot Vale in Melbourne's north-west. Des Moran was the brother of slain underworld figure Lewis Moran, who was murdered in 2004 during Melbourne's gangland war, and uncle to Mark and Jason Moran, who were also killed in gangland disputes. Des Moran originally escaped serious injury in March 2009 when shots were fired outside his Ascot Vale home. He was in his car with a friend when one shot was fired through the front windscreen, narrowly missing the pair. At the time, a Purana Task Force detective said police did not believe that incident was related to the Gangland war. On Tuesday 16 June 2009, his sister-in-law Judy Moran was arrested and charged as the driver, along with two other people in relation to the murder. Judy Moran's house was coincidentally damaged by fire while she was in custody.

=== 2010 ===
- 19 April 2010 – Carl Williams was bashed to death by fellow inmate Matthew Charles Johnson (37) at HM Barwon Prison Johnson was already serving multiple life sentences for unrelated gangland murders.

== Arrests and sentencing ==
Carl Williams was later charged along with Victor Brincat and Thomas Hentschel. He pleaded guilty to drug trafficking charges relating to his arrest in 2001 and in October 2004 was given a seven-year jail sentence, which he was serving in the maximum security Acacia unit of Barwon Prison at the time of his death.

17 September 2004, Alfonso Traglia, Victor Brincat and Carl Williams were charged with the murders of Jason Moran and Pasquale Barbaro. In May 2005 Carl Williams was additionally charged with the murder of Mark Moran, after a former employee agreed to testify that he was Carl's driver on the day of the incident, and drove him to a location near Mark's house at the time of the murder. Zarah Garde-Wilson, the widow of Lewis Caine, is defending all of the men in their court cases.

In May 2005, Keith Faure, brother Noel Faure, 50, and Evangelos Goussis, 37, all of Geelong were charged with the murder of Lewis Moran and the attempted murder of Bert Wrout. Security footage from Moran's murder showed that one of the gunmen had a tattoo identical to one of the accused. Previously Keith and Evangelos been charged with the murder of Lewis Caine. Faure and associate, Evangelos Goussis became the first convicted of murder related to the gangland killings on 3 November 2005.

Known underworld figure Nicholas Ibrahim and Abraham Mokdessi was charged with the murder of Housam Zayat. During the trial in June 2005 an eyewitness to the shooting refused at the last minute to testify against Ibrahim, and was charged with contempt of court.

In June 2005, Mick Gatto was found not guilty of the murder of Andrew Veniamin. During the trial, he claimed he had acted in self-defence after Veniamin pulled out a .38 calibre handgun and threatened to kill him. Gatto claims that during a struggle he was able to turn the gun around on Veniamin and fire one shot into his neck, and one shot in the eye. He also claimed that during the argument, Veniamin had implicated himself in the deaths of Dino Dibra, Paul Kallipolitis and Graham Kinniburgh.

On 3 November 2005, Keith Faure and Evangelos Goussis became the first convicted with murder related to the Melbourne gangland killings. Both have appealed their conviction.

On 14 July 2006, Damien Cossu was arrested at gunpoint while driving in Sydney. He was charged with the murder of Mark Mallia whose tortured body was stuffed in a wheelie bin, dumped in a stormwater drain and set alight. Cossu was also present at the murder of Nik Radev.

On 28 February 2007, Carl Williams pleaded guilty to murdering Jason Moran in June 2003 and his father Lewis Moran in March 2004. He also pleaded guilty to a third murder, but the name of that victim was suppressed until recently when it was announced that it was Mark Mallia.

On 6 June 2007, it was announced that Tony Mokbel had been arrested in a café in Athens. At the time of his arrest, his appearance had changed significantly from when he went missing. Wearing a brown stuff wig and having grown a beard, Mokbel was found carrying a fake Australian passport and driver's licence in the name of Stephen Papas. Mokbel was finally extradited back to Melbourne (and Barwon Prison) on 17 May 2008, from Athens via a heavily guarded, private charter plane. His flight path included refuelling in the Maldives and Port Hedland, before landing at Tullamarine. He was then flown in a police helicopter to Barwon Prison. He appeared via video link to the Melbourne Magistrates Court on 20 May 2008.

On the same night Mokbel was arrested, police carried out a raid on an underworld gang calling themselves 'The Company'. Fourteen other underworld figures were arrested in Melbourne. Drugs, weapons and $790,000 in cash were seized.

Purana Taskforce detectives arrested Angelo Mario Venditti for the murder of Paul Kallipoitis on 29 July 2008.

On 9 March 2011, Judy Moran, the mother of slain sons, Mark and Jason Moran and also the ex-de facto partner of Lewis Moran (who was murdered in 2004) was found guilty of the murder of her brother-in-law Desmond "Tuppence" Moran. Moran claimed that she was visiting her son, Mark's grave at Fawkner cemetery at the time as the date of the murder was also the ninth anniversary of Mark's death. But the real motive for the crime was on ongoing dispute between Judy and Des over the money remaining after the murders of three family members. Judy Moran drove the shooter, Geoffery Armour and also accomplice Michael Farrugia to and from the Ascot Vale deli where Des was eventually shot and killed. It was then revealed that Armour pleaded guilty to the murder of Des Moran with Farrugia pleading guilty to manslaughter months earlier before becoming the prosecution's star witness in the case against Judy Moran in which the jury took seven days to deliberate before finally finding Moran guilty of murder. She will be eligible for parole in 2032 at the age of 88.

== 2019 Royal Commission ==
In December 2018, it was revealed that one of the defence lawyers involved in the prosecutions had become a police informant, prompting a royal commission. The defence lawyer was known by the pseudonym Lawyer X or Informer 3838. On 1 March 2019, the Court of Appeal revealed that former defence barrister Nicola Gobbo was Lawyer X. The Royal Commission into the Management of Police Informants will examine the extent to which cases may have been affected by the conduct of Gobbo, who was registered as an informant with Victoria Police from 1 January 1995 to 13 January 2009.

== In popular culture ==
A drama series detailing the gangland war and the efforts made by the Purana taskforce to contain it, Underbelly, premiered on the Australia local television Nine Network on 13 February 2008. Ongoing legal proceedings in Victoria made Justice Betty King prohibit the Nine Network from airing the show in Victoria and from providing access to the show via their website. An edited version commenced screening in Victoria on 14 September 2008. In 2011, the ban was lifted, and the series aired in an unedited version in Victoria.

The drama series Fat Tony & Co., which detailed the crimes of and specifically the manhunt to catch Tony Mokbel, made regular references to the gangland killings. It aired on the Nine Network from 23 February to 6 April 2014.

In 2020, the mini-series Informer 3838 dramatised how Nicola Gobbo was a police informant through the latter stages of her career as a criminal defence barrister. It focuses on Gobbo informing on her high-profile client Carl Williams.

== See also ==
- Crime in Melbourne
- List of unsolved murders (1980–1999)
- List of unsolved murders (2000–present)
- Underbelly
- Sydney gangland war, a similar series of gangland killings that took place in Sydney during the 1980s

== Sources ==
- Silvester, John (2009). Underbelly : the gangland war. Andrew Rule. London: John Blake. ISBN 978-1-84454-737-1. OCLC 280428353.
- Houlihan, Liam (2015). Once upon a time in Melbourne. Carlton, Victoria. ISBN 978-0-522-86937-8. OCLC 949713472.
- Ford, Justine (2018). The good cop : the true story of Ron Iddles, Australia's greatest detective. Sydney, N.S.W. ISBN 978-1-76055-812-3. OCLC 1031380765.
- Dowsley, Anthony (2020). Lawyer X. Patrick Carlyon. Sydney, N.S.W. ISBN 978-1-4607-5806-9. OCLC 1108822090.
- Dale, Paul (2020). Cops, drugs, Lawyer X and me. Vikki Petraitis. Sydney, N.S.W. ISBN 978-0-7336-4380-4. OCLC 1125971502.
- Nixon, Christine (2012). Fair cop. Jo Chandler. Carlton, Vic.: Victory Books. ISBN 978-0-522-86205-8. OCLC 801841922.
- Illingworth, Simon (2008). Filthy rat : one man's stand against police corruption and Melbourne's gangland war (2nd ed.). Fremantle, W.A.: Fontaine Press. ISBN 978-0-9804170-4-3. OCLC 271761919.
- Shand, Adam (2007). Big shots. Camberwell, Vic.: Viking. ISBN 978-0-670-04071-1. OCLC 174101919.
- Houlihan, Liam (2011). Bigwig : the remarkable rise and fall of Tony Mokbel. Pymble, N.S.W.: HarperCollins. ISBN 978-0-7322-9002-3. OCLC 730004054.
