= Lewis Moran =

Australian criminal

- Born: 7 July 1941
- Died: 31 March 2004 (aged 62); Sydney Road, Brunswick, Victoria, Australia
- Spouse: Judy Moran
- Children: Jason Moran (son); Mark Moran (stepson)
- Status: homicide by firearm
- Allegiance: The Carlton Crew
- Criminal charge: Drug trafficking

Lewis Moran (7 July 1941 – 31 March 2004) was an Australian organised crime figure and patriarch of the infamous Moran family of Melbourne, Victoria, Australia. Notable for his involvement in the Melbourne gangland killings, Moran was shot dead in The Brunswick Club Hotel in Melbourne on 31 March 2004. His murder occurred one week after the funeral of fellow Melbourne underworld criminal and suspected hitman Andrew Veniamin.

Moran, married to Judy Moran, was the father of murdered Melbourne underworld figure Jason Moran, murdered in 2003, and stepfather of Mark Moran, murdered in 2000. Moran was a long-term associate of Graham Kinniburgh after meeting as workers on Melbourne's waterside. Kinniburgh was earlier executed outside his Kew home on 13 December 2003. He was also the brother of underworld figure Desmond "Tuppence" Moran, who was shot dead on 15 June 2009, just outside a cafe on Union Road in Ascot Vale.

== Murder ==
On 31 March 2004, Lewis Moran and Herbert "Bertie" Wrout were at The Brunswick Club Hotel, on Sydney Road, Brunswick, which was their regular drinking place. Both men were on bail and did not carry firearms, which would have been a breach of their bail conditions. Moran was on bail facing serious drug trafficking charges. Two gunmen wearing balaclavas entered the Brunswick Club, at approximately 6:40 p.m. on that day, driving a Ford Falcon EF XR6 station wagon. Moran ran from his place at the bar, over a poker machine, through a glass window before the gunman caught up with him and shot him twice, the fatal bullet being fired into the back of his head from a few centimetres away. Wrout was severely wounded but survived the attack.

Keith Faure, his brother Noel Faure and associate Evangelos Goussis were charged on 13 May 2005 with the murder and shooting. Initially, they all pleaded not guilty. On 3 May 2006, Keith Faure pleaded guilty and was sentenced to life imprisonment with a non-parole period of 19 years for the murders of Moran and Lewis Caine, who was killed two months after Moran. Noel Faure, who was described as a "gun for hire", was convicted of the murder of Moran and of shooting Herbert Wrout and was sentenced to life imprisonment with a non-parole period of 23 years. Former Kickboxing champ Goussis, 40, of Geelong was found guilty of Moran's murder on 29 May 2008 in the Victorian Supreme Court. Goussis had stormed into the Brunswick Club and shot Moran as he cowered in a corner. Goussis and two others reportedly accepted a $150,000 contract from Tony Mokbel to kill Moran, the Victorian Supreme Court heard. After five days deliberation, the jury also found Goussis guilty of intentionally causing serious injury to Wrout, but not guilty of his attempted murder. Goussis was also convicted of murdering Caine. In February 2009, Goussis was sentenced to a minimum of 30 years in prison for Moran's murder. Lewis Moran was suspected of ordering the death of underworld Hitman Dino Dibra.

On 7 May 2007, Carl Williams was convicted of commissioning the murders of four gangland rivals including Jason Moran, Lewis Moran, Mark Mallia and Michael Marshall and for conspiracy to murder a fourth, and sentenced to life imprisonment with a non-parole period of 35 years. Williams died in Barwon prison, on 19 April 2010, as the result of an attack by a fellow inmate.

Noel Faure, who was convicted of the murder of Moran for a fee of A$150,000 and of shooting Herbert Wrout, and was serving a life sentence, died in prison on 8 March 2017, aged 62 after suffering a long illness.

== References in art and popular culture ==
In the local Australian TV drama series Underbelly Lewis Moran was played by actor Kevin Harrington. Moran is also portrayed in the Australian TV drama series Killing Time by actor Colin Friels.

'Lewis in the U' for solo bass, choir and instrumental ensemble depicts the death of Lewis Moran. It is the 5th of Martin Friedel's Underworld Songs and was first performed at the Abbotsford Convent in Melbourne by Astra conducted by John McCaughey on 21 and 22 September 2013.

== See also ==
- Crime in Melbourne
