= Moran family =

Australian-based criminal family

Moran Family
- Founded: 1970s
- Founded by: Lewis Moran
- Founding location: Melbourne, Australia
- Years active: 1970s-present
- Territory: Melbourne
- Ethnicity: Irish Australians
- Membership: 5 members + 10-15 associates (ex-FSPDU)
- Criminal activities: drug trafficking, corruption, money laundering, debt collection
- Allies: Carlton Crew, Federated Ship Painters and Dockers Union/ Irish Mob
- Rivals: Williams Gang

The Moran family is a Melbourne, Australia-based criminal family notable for their involvement in the Melbourne gangland killings. Family matriarch Judy Moran lost two sons, Jason and Mark, estranged husband Lewis, and brother-in-law Des in an underworld feud that resulted in the deaths of over 30 criminals from January 1998 to August 2010.

== Family members ==
Members of the Moran family include:

=== Lewis Moran ===
Lewis Moran
- Born: 7 July 1941
- Died: 31 March 2004 (aged 62); Sydney Road, Brunswick, Victoria, Australia
- Spouse: Judy Moran
- Children: Jason Moran, Mark Moran (stepson)
- Status: Murdered
- Criminal charge: Drug trafficking

Lewis Moran was the patriarch and father of Jason Moran. On 31 March 2004 he was shot dead in a club on Sydney Road, Brunswick. At the time of his death he was on bail facing drug trafficking charges. Police had unsuccessfully attempted to keep Lewis Moran imprisoned due to concerns for his safety.

=== Judy Moran ===
Judy Moran
- Born: Judith Maryanne Brooks; 18 December 1944 (age 81); Victoria, Australia
- Spouse(s): Leslie John "Johnny" Cole (1963–1982); Lewis Moran (1966–1995)
- Children: Mark Moran (son); Jason Moran (son)
- Status: Incarcerated
- Criminal charge: Murder
- Penalty: 26 years jail

Judy Moran is the matriarch of the family. She was first married to Leslie John Cole, who was shot dead in Boronia Street, Kyle Bay, Sydney during a gangland conflict on 10 November 1982. Judy Moran was divorced from Cole at the time of his death and had begun a relationship with Lewis Moran. Though she legally assumed the surname of Moran, she and Lewis Moran were never married.

On 16 June 2009, Judy Moran and three others were arrested in relation to the murder of Desmond Moran, Lewis's brother, in Ascot Vale on 15 June 2009. Judy Moran was subsequently charged with being an accessory after the fact and remanded into custody. On the night of 16 June her home in Ascot Vale was set on fire in an apparent arson attack.

On 9 March 2011, Judy Moran was convicted of the murder of Des 'Tuppence' Moran, and 10 August 2011 she was sentenced to 26 years' imprisonment for the murder.

=== Desmond Moran ===
Desmond "Tuppence" Moran, the brother of Lewis Moran, had publicly claimed to be out of the criminal business. On 17 March 2009 at about 8.50pm, he was the target of an unsuccessful assassination attempt outside his home in Langs Road, Ascot Vale. As he sat in his car, a single bullet struck the steering wheel and was deflected from the driver. Moran was in the passenger seat, and witnesses claim to have seen the would-be killer fleeing immediately after firing the single shot.

At about midday on 15 June 2009, Moran was shot dead outside the Ascot Pasta and Deli Cafe on Union Road in Ascot Vale. On 16 June, Judy Moran and three others were arrested for his murder. The others arrested included Suzie Kane, sister-in-law of Judy Moran's deceased son, Jason Moran. Judy Moran and Kane were subsequently charged with being an accessory after the fact. On 9 March 2011, Judy was found guilty of his murder and 10 August 2011 she was sentenced to 26 years' imprisonment for his murder.

Mark Anthony Moran
- Born: Mark Cole; 4 July 1964
- Died: 15 June 2000 (aged 35); Aberfeldie, Victoria, Australia
- Other name: Mark Anthony John Cole
- Occupations: Personal trainer, pastry cook
- Children: 2
- Parent(s): Leslie Cole (father), Judy Moran (mother); Lewis Moran (stepfather)
- Status: Murdered

=== Mark Moran ===
Mark Moran (born Mark Cole) was the son of Judy Moran and her first husband, Leslie Cole. On 15 June 2000, Mark Moran was killed by two bullets as he was getting into his car outside his luxury home in Aberfeldie.

Jason Matthew Patrick Moran
- Born: 20 September 1967
- Died: 21 June 2003 (aged 35); Essendon, Victoria, Australia
- Spouse: Trish Kane
- Children: 2
- Parent(s): Lewis Moran, Judy Moran
- Status: Murdered

=== Jason Moran ===
Jason Moran was imprisoned on assault-related charges for a brawl in a King Street Nightclub. Alphonse Gangitano was also charged but was murdered before sentencing. Jason Moran was considered a person of interest in Gangitano's murder.

On 21 June 2003, Jason Moran and associate Pasquale Barbaro were shot by a lone gunman whilst watching a Saturday morning Auskick Australian rules football clinic his children were attending. Police feared the murder of Jason Moran would lead to further violence in the Melbourne underworld war.

== References in popular culture ==
The family's activities were the primary plot of the television series Underbelly.
