= Melbourne Markets =

Coordinates: 37°39′14″S 144°59′38″E

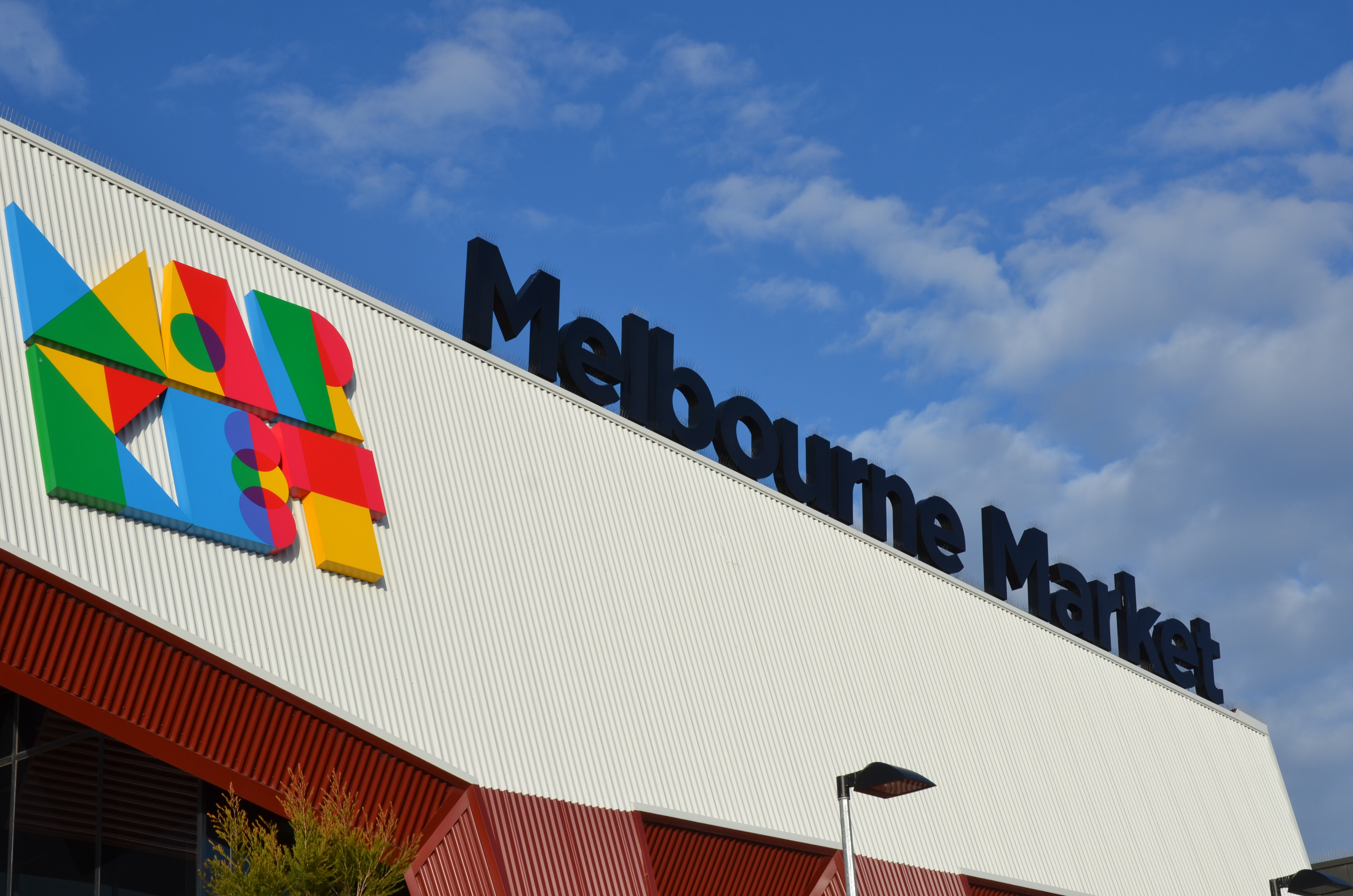

Melbourne Market, more formally the Melbourne Wholesale Fruit & Vegetable Markets, is the main wholesale produce market for Melbourne, and the wider state of Victoria, Australia.

The market is operated by the Melbourne Market Authority (MMA), a statutory authority established by the Melbourne Market Authority Act 1977, under the control of the Department of Energy, Environment and Climate Action.

== Operation ==
Melbourne Market operates six days a week, from its 67-hectare site in Epping. The market provides for the wholesale distribution of fruit, vegetables and flowers to the greater Melbourne region daily.

The market was home to 3000 sellers and buyers in 2016, up to an estimated 5000 in 2021. The number of vendors was estimated at 400 in 2025.

== Location ==
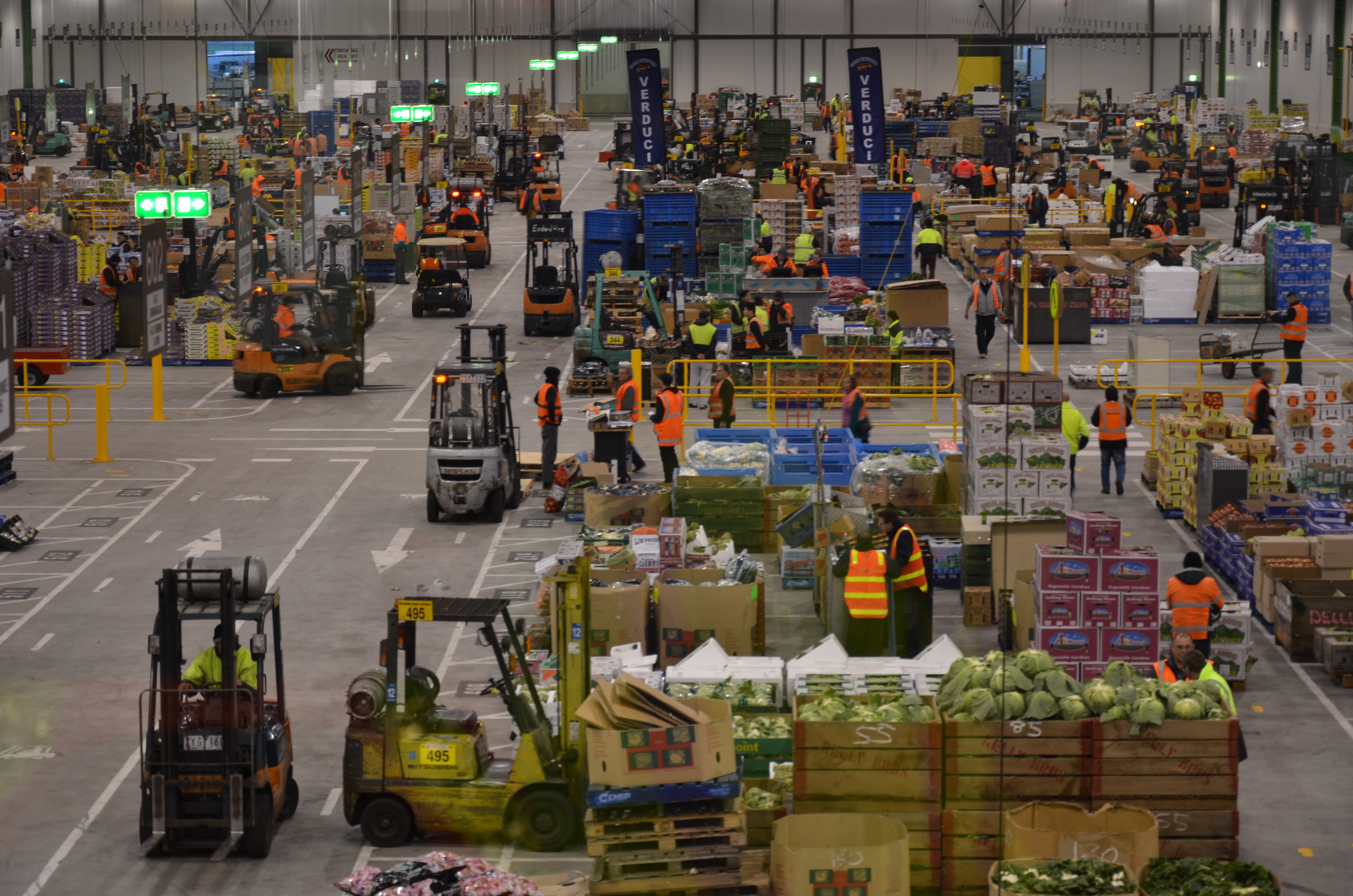
Grower trading area

Melbourne Market is located in the outer-suburb of Epping, 30 kilometres north of the city centre.

The markets were previously located on a 33-hectare site in Footscray Road, West Melbourne, adjacent to the Melbourne Fish Markets, the Port of Melbourne and the South Dynon railway yards but were moved to Epping in 2015.

The move from Footscray to Epping was a protracted one, delivered at least four years behind schedule. In 2014, it was reported that the Footscray site was 14,000 square metres and the Epping site a much smaller 7,500 square metres.

Prior to Footscray, the markets were at the Queen Victoria Market and, before that, the Western Market in Collins Street which opened in 1841.

== Rents ==
After the move from Footscray to Epping, the Supreme Court ruled that "rents needed to remain the same as the old site for a period of time"; the rates were also kept steady during the pandemic.

In 2024, the market announced that it was more than doubling the rent for vendors. The MMA proposed raising the rent annual by 7.6 per cent for 10 years, with the average rent expected to rise from $100,000 to $220,000 per year. The proposed increase led wholesalers to protests and withhold rent and was expected to lead to flow-on increases in the cost of fruits and vegetables in the state.

In April 2025, the MMA countered with a rent increase of 2.4 - 3.6 per cent per year and issued eviction notices to 12 tenants.
