= Jason Moran (criminal) =

Australian criminal

- Born: Jason Matthew Patrick Moran; 22 September 1967; Melbourne, Victoria, Australia
- Died: 21 June 2003 (aged 35); Essendon, Victoria, Australia
- Occupations: Mobster, drug trafficker
- Known for: Participant in the Melbourne gangland killings
- Spouse: Trish Kane
- Children: 2
- Parent(s): Lewis Moran; Judy Moran
- Relatives: Mark Moran (half brother)
- Status: Deceased
- Allegiance: The Carlton Crew

Jason Matthew Patrick Moran (22 September 1967 – 21 June 2003) was an Australian criminal from Melbourne, and one of the leaders of the Moran family, notable for their involvement in the Melbourne gangland killings.

== Early life ==
Moran was the son of Lewis Moran and Judy Moran. Mark Moran was his half-brother. Moran attended Penleigh and Essendon Grammar School. He met his future wife, Trisha Kane, at 15 years of age. She is the daughter of Les Kane, a Melbourne painter and docker and reputed criminal who was murdered in his family home on 19 October 1978.

During the 1990s Moran emerged as one of Melbourne's main dealers in "party" drugs. During this time he had a team of up-and-coming western suburbs gangsters led by Bluey Watkins who has been missing since 1995.

Moran was reported to have shot Carl Williams in the stomach during an argument in Gladstone Park on 13 October 1999, giving rise to lengthy violent turf wars known as the Melbourne gangland killings. Jason Moran had attended the funeral of another slain mobster, Victor Peirce.

Alphonse Gangitano and Moran, along with associate Mark John McNamara, were charged over an attack in the Sports Bar nightclub in King Street, Melbourne, on 19 December 1995, for which Moran received a term of imprisonment.

Moran was considered by many to be a "dead man walking" and when paroled from prison in September 2001 was allowed to leave Australia due to fears for his life. He later returned to give evidence in the inquest into the death of Gangitano on 20 November which began on 14 January 2002. Moran was suspected in Gangitano's murder. Gangitano was found dead in the laundry of his Templestowe house by his wife in 1998. A coroner found that Jason Moran and Graham Kinniburgh were present during Gangitano's murder in January 1998. According to former Moran associate Bertie Wrout, however, it was Kinniburgh who killed Gangitano and it was Mark—not Jason—Moran who was his accomplice.

== Murder ==
Pasquale Barbaro and Moran were gunned down on 21 June 2003 at Cross Keys Reserve in Essendon, where they had been watching Moran's young children play football. On returning to their motor vehicle they were shot dead by a lone gunman. Security footage from a neighbouring hotel showed the van they had driven to the football grounds and a figure running away from the vehicle. Police feared that the murders would lead to further violence in the Melbourne underworld war. Father Joe Giaccobe, a friend of the Moran family, officiated at Moran's funeral. During the service, another priest, Father John Martin, said:

"Any funeral presents a challenge. Obviously, the church does not make judgements about the person. They need the prayers and whatever the church can do for them...They have to answer to God. We will not deny them."

Moran's father, Lewis Moran, was unable to attend the service due to incarceration at Port Phillip Correctional Centre. Authorities refused his request, for security reasons, to be released from prison to attend the service. Lewis Moran was later murdered while drinking in a Brunswick bar.

On 28 February 2007, Carl Williams pleaded guilty in the Supreme Court of Victoria to the murder of Moran (but not of Barbaro). The actual shooting was done by a killer often known as the "Runner" (Victor Brincat) with Williams having organised the killing. Williams was sentenced to life imprisonment, with a minimum of 35 years, on 7 May 2007. He was later murdered while incarcerated at Barwon prison on 19 April 2010.

== References in popular culture ==
In the drama series Underbelly Jason Moran was played by Les Hill. Hill later reprised that role in the 2014 series Fat Tony & Co..
