= Mick Gatto =

Australian boxer (born 1955)

- Born: Domenic Gatto; 6 August 1955 (age 71)
- Occupations: Businessman; mediator; event promoter
- Spouse: Cheryle Gatto

Domenic "Mick" Gatto (born 6 August 1955) is an Australian boxer, debt collector, and professional mediator within the Victorian building industry. He was named as a standover man during the Royal Commission into the Building and Construction Industry. Gatto was involved in Melbourne's illegal gambling scene in the 1980s and 1990s. In 2004, Gatto was given a ten-year gaming ban, subsequently increased to a lifetime ban.

Gatto was raised in Melbourne and commenced working in the fruit and vegetable industry.

== Murder acquittal ==
In 2004, Gatto was charged with the murder of Andrew Veniamin, a suspected underworld hitman. Gatto was remanded in custody for 18 months. He was found not guilty at trial, during which Gatto claimed he had acted in self-defence after Veniamin pulled out a .38 handgun and threatened to kill him. Gatto claimed that during a struggle he was able to turn the gun around on Veniamin and fire one shot into his neck, and one shot in the eye. He also claimed that during the argument, Veniamin had implicated himself in the deaths of Dino Dibra, Paul Kallipolitis and Graham Kinniburgh.

At the time of charging Vince Benvenuto with the 2002 murder of Victor Peirce, it was alleged that Gatto had links to both men and to Faruk Orman, the man later convicted of Peirce's murder and acquitted in 2019. No charges were laid against Gatto.

== Royal Commission ==
In proceedings before the Cole Royal Commission, it was heard that Gatto was involved in resolving certain business disputes. Witnesses attested that Gatto and his business associate, David "the Rock" Hedgcock, had been involved in solving industrial relations problems in the construction industry. One witness, a representative of Baulderstone Hornibrook expressed the fears of a colleague stating, "... he expressed some concerns about his safety, that people associated with this deal were the sorts of people that break legs ..." Gatto and Hedgcock's solicitor rejected any implication they had used threats or intimidation. Appearing before the Royal Commission in 2002, Gatto claimed he was being made a scapegoat by the inquiry and strenuously denied he was a standover man.

I'm not a standover man. I'm not a man of ill repute. Fair enough I've got a chequered past. ... but I paid for ... whatever I have done wrong. I don't appreciate this nonsense that you are looking for someone to blame to justify your existence here today, to justify 300 investigators and teams of lawyers. You won't be justifying your existence with me. I promise you. I will fight you all the way, tooth and nail.

— Mick Gatto, before the Royal Commission into the Building and Construction Industry, 28 February 2002.

== Community involvement concerns ==
When concerns were raised in the media regarding Sydney neurosurgeon Dr Charlie Teo in 2019, the Sydney Morning Herald was contacted by an associate of Gatto. The associate, according to the reporter Kate McClymont, expressed concern to the newspaper at the questions they were raising with Teo, including about alleged sexual harassment of colleagues in Arkansas, United States. Teo denied he had raised the matter of the Herald's questions with Gatto. Gatto had hosted a fundraising dinner for Teo's Cure for Life Foundation in 2012. Gatto stated in 2014 that he had raised over $4.5 million for charity over ten years.

In 2017 it was alleged by former employees of the football club that Gatto had been approached to assist in the resolution of matters involving Stephen Dank and the Essendon Football Club supplements controversy; the club denied this.

== Legal and tax problems ==
A former boxing promoter, the government led by Denis Napthine in Victoria withdrew his fight promotional licence.

In 2016, Gatto was charged with possession of an unregistered firearm and of possession of a firearm and ammunition without a licence. He told the court he kept the loaded sawn-off shotgun in his home because of fears for his life, having been threatened by a criminal cartel. The magistrate accepted his fears were genuinely held. Gatto pleaded guilty to two weapons offences and was fined.

In April 2017 it was reported that Gatto settled a long-running dispute with the Australian Taxation Office (ATO). It was claimed that Gatto and his family owed the ATO $15 million; and both parties agreed to settle the matter for less than $4 million. It was reported that in order to pay the ATO, Gatto sold his Lower Plenty home for $4.1 million. Gatto and his family also own a residence at Mount Martha, on the Mornington Peninsula.

In 2020 Gatto launched a defamation lawsuit against the Australian Broadcasting Corporation (ABC). Gatto claimed the article made him out to be a "murderer" and "one of Australia's most violent criminals". In 2021 Justice Andrew Keogh ruled in favour of the ABC, stating "Far from being distorted, the article was entirely accurate and correlated with what occurred in those parts of the Proceedings which were reported."

In June 2026, Gatto was arrested without charge because of "alleged financial offences".

== Industrial relations and construction industry payments ==
In June 2026, an investigation by The Age and 60 Minutes, based on leaked financial records from an associate, reported that Gatto and his business partners had received millions of dollars in payments from more than a dozen subcontractors working on Victoria's "Big Build" infrastructure program. The leaked documents showed ongoing transactions through 2025 and 2026 to Gatto-controlled consulting entities, including Arbitrations and Mediations Pty Ltd and Bridgeview Consulting.

According to the reports, several subcontractors (including Cycon Civil, Project Labour Solutions, M1 Trades & Labour, and Major Cranes) had paid sums ranging from tens of thousands to over $1 million to Gatto, who operates as a self-styled mediator and arbitrator. Some company owners publicly stated they felt compelled to employ Gatto for "industrial relations services" to resolve blockages by the CFMEU and secure access to state and federally funded construction projects. Gatto declined to comment on the specific details of the leak, but has previously denied receiving payments from Big Build subcontractors or being involved in any wrongdoing.

== Published works ==
- Gatto, Mick; Noble, Tom (2009). I, Mick Gatto. Melbourne University Publishing. ISBN 978-0-522-85701-6.

== In popular culture ==
In the Australian TV drama series Underbelly based on the Melbourne gangland killings, Gatto was portrayed by actor Simon Westaway, and in the second series, by Luke McKenzie.
