= Nik Radev =

Bulgarian criminal and mobster

- Ник Радев
- Born: 29 January 1959; Yambol, Yambol Okrug, People's Republic of Bulgaria
- Died: 15 April 2003 (aged 44); Coburg, Victoria, Australia
- Other name: The Russian
- Occupations: Mob enforcer, extortionist, drug dealer, wrestler (formerly)
- Spouse: Sylvia Bruno
- Children: 1 daughter
- Status: Deceased
- Convictions: Armed robbery, assault, blackmail, extortion and rape
- Penalty: Short prison terms

Nikolai Minev "Nik" Radev (Bulgarian: Николай Минев Радев; 29 January 1959 – 15 April 2003), nicknamed The Russian, Nik the Russian, and Bulgarian Nick, was a Bulgarian career criminal and mobster who was involved in crime in Melbourne, Australia.

== Early life ==
Radev was born in Yambol. In his youth, Radev engaged in wrestling, winning a championship. He also had an extensive criminal record in Bulgaria, having served time in both Bulgarian and Turkish prisons. Radev emigrated to Australia on 3 July 1980, claiming political persecution in Bulgaria. Australian authorities were unaware of Radev's criminal past and granted him refugee status. After settling in Melbourne, he married Sylvia Bruno and in 1981, he was recorded as working at a fish and chips shop. By 1983, he was unemployed.

Author Rochelle Jackson cited an anonymous source in Bulgaria who claimed that Radev had competed as an international wrestler and was made a member of the Communist Party of Bulgaria for his success, trained in the Soviet Union with the KGB and spetsnaz, and served as a bodyguard to Prime Minister of Bulgaria Stanko Todorov and his daughter Lyudmila. The same source also alleged that Radev was involved in drug trafficking and money laundering in Bulgaria. Jackson acknowledged that the claims are unverifiable, but noted that Radev made statements to his wife indicating past involvement as a companion to a "very wealthy woman".

Radev Gang
- Years active: ? - 2003
- Territory: Melbourne
- Ethnicity: Bulgarians, Serbs, Russians, White Australians
- Membership: ca. 15-20
- Activities: drug trafficking, pimping, extortion
- Allies: The Carlton Crew, Bulgarian mafia, Russian mafia, Serbian mafia, Honoured Society
- Rivals: Williams Gang, Sunshine Crew, Mokbel Network

== Criminal activity in Australia ==
Radev had a notoriety for his sadistic and ruthless behavior. He was known to terrorise his extortion clients until they complied with his demands. It was reported that he once raped a man who owed him money in front of the man's own wife and children. In another instance, Radev was acquitted of aggravated burglary, during which he shoved the barrel of a gun in the mouth of a man's daughter. During his life he was jailed for theft assault, blackmail, threats to kill, extortion, firearm offences, armed robbery and drug charges. According to police he was an enforcer for the Melbourne head of the Russian mafia, robbing drug dealers. For a time, Radev was also considered a suspect in the 1998 Silk–Miller police murders.

Radev was shot and killed in Queen St, Coburg on 15 April 2003, as part of a series of similar events that are commonly referred to as the Melbourne gangland killings.

He was shot seven times in the head and chest in front of his bodyguard after he stood out from his black Mercedes-Benz CLK 500 convertible. A third person in Nik Radev's entourage was driving a light green 2000 Toyota Camry CSI sedan parked directly in front of his Mercedes-Benz near the corner of Queen & Reynard Streets, Coburg also witnessed the murder. At the time of his death, Radev was indicted on one charge of illegal firearms possession and two rape charges.

Victoria Police told The Age that they believed his death was planned by a father and son drug manufacturing team, and a hitman suspected of four other murders carried out the killing in a red Ford Falcon XR6 Turbo sedan. His associates Damien Cossu and Alfonso Traglia were with Radev at the time of the murder but claimed they could not identify the gunman, and were subsequently named by police as 'persons of interest'.

Despite only having worked for eight months during the 1980s at a fish and chip shop, Radev was killed wearing Versace clothing and a $20,000 watch, and was buried in a gold-plated coffin. Victorian Police suspect that Andrew Veniamin and Carl Williams were behind the killing.

== Popular culture ==
Radev was portrayed by Don Hany in the Australian TV series Underbelly and the subsequent telemovie Underbelly Files: Tell Them Lucifer was Here.

== See also ==
- List of unsolved murders (2000–present)
