= Federated Ship Painters and Dockers Union =

Australian shipbuilders trade union (1900 – 1993)

FSPDU
- Federated Ship Painters and Dockers Union of Australia
- Deregistered: Members joined MUA and AMWU
- Founded: 1900
- Dissolved: 1 December 1993
- Headquarters: Balmain, New South Wales
- Location: Australia

The Federated Ship Painters and Dockers Union (FSPDU) was an Australian trade union which existed between 1900 and 1993. It represented labourers in the shipbuilding industry, covering "mostly work associated with chipping, painting, scrubbing [and] cleaning [ships], working in every size of tanks, cleaning boilers, docking and undocking vessels, and rigging work".

== History ==
=== Establishment ===
The Painters and Dockers' Union had its origins in the New South Wales Associated Laborers Union, also known as the Balmain Labourers Union, which was established in Balmain in May 1883. The new union was formed to represent all unskilled workers or labourers in the area, but was focussed mainly on shipbuilding and ship repair, the main industry in Balmain. The union gradually grew in stature over the next decade, affiliating with the Trades and Labor Council of Sydney in 1889 and establishing the Balmain Trades and Labor Hall in 1890. The union was involved in the unsuccessful 1890 Maritime Strike. The union was also heavily involved in the formation of the first branch of the Labor Electoral League of New South Wales, the forerunner to the Australian Labor Party, in Balmain in April 1891. The union's finances suffered during the depression of the 1890s and in January 1898 the union's members unanimously voted for its dissolution.

Following the dissolution of the Balmain Labourers' Union its members were reorganised along industrial lines, with the broad coverage of unskilled and semi-skilled workers in the shipbuilding industry split mainly between the Federated Ironworkers' Association and the Federated Ship Painters and Dockers' Union of Port Jackson, the latter being formally established in 1900. The union conducted two successful strikes in the same year, establishing closed shop arrangements in the industry. The union soon expanded out of Balmain to represent painters and dockers working throughout Sydney Harbour, growing rapidly from 449 members in 1902 to 1,954 in 1907. The union achieved its first industrial award in 1903, a collective agreement with employers, registered by consent, before amalgamating with similar unions in other states to form the Federated Ship Painters and Dockers Union of Australia in 1909. The union achieved federal registration in 1916, giving it access to the federal system of arbitration and conciliation courts.

=== Growth ===
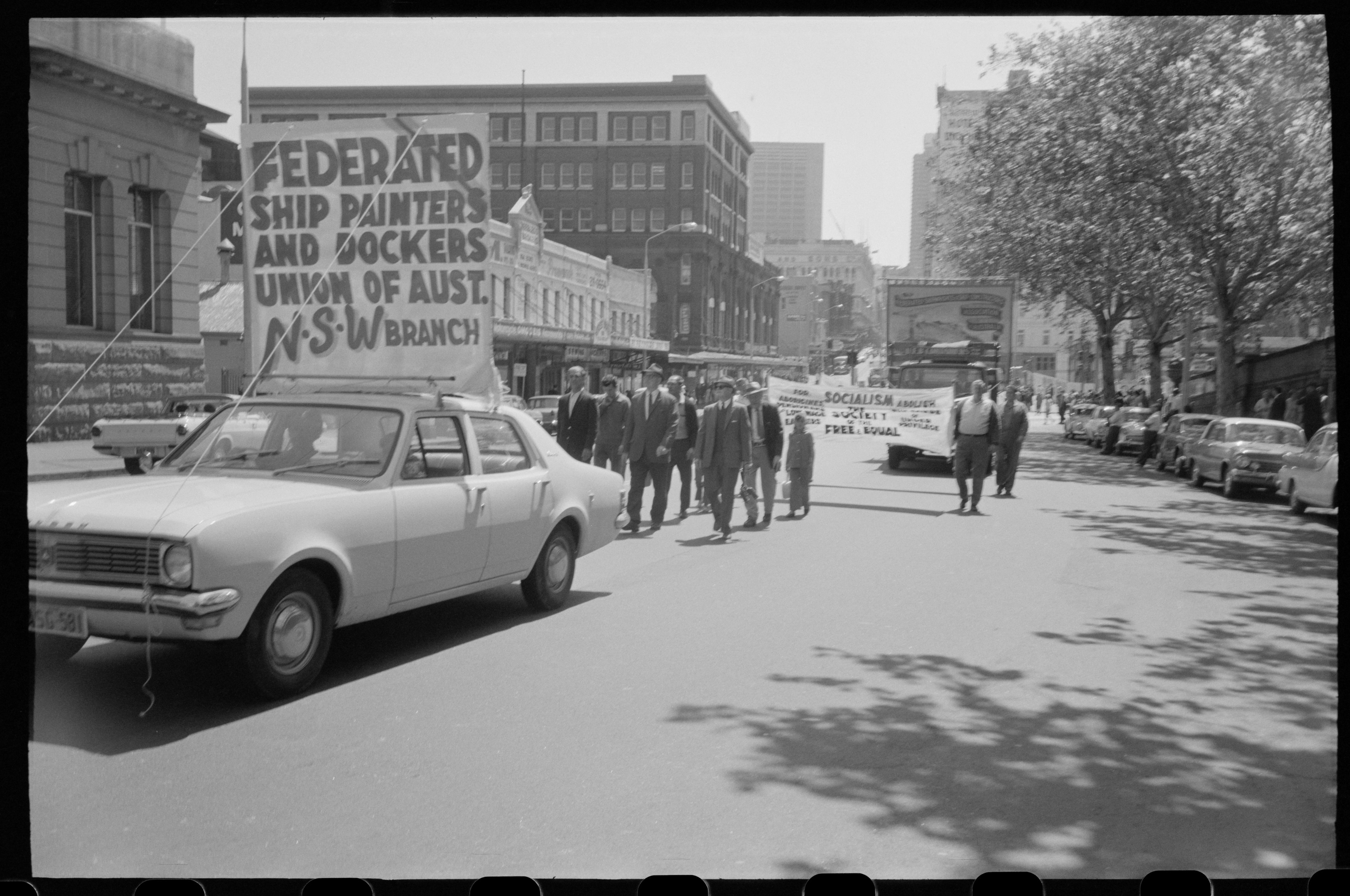
Members in protest march, Sydney, 1969

Working conditions and pay for ship painters and dockers in the early 20th century were poor, with 80 percent of the union's membership in 1939 earning less than the basic wage. Ninety percent of painters and dockers were employed as casuals, under the free selection of labour system. This meant workers had to wait outside shipyards and port workshops, where foremen would choose different men to work each day, depending on the requirements of the employer. The union made significant efforts to regulate this system of hiring, including introducing limits on the minimum length of employment and the number of hours workers would wait each day, but with little success.

Conditions changed dramatically during World War II, as increased demand in the shipbuilding industry led to a labour shortage. The membership of the union grew rapidly, increasing in Sydney from 880 in 1939 to 2792 in 1945. During 1945 the union began operating a roster for painters and dockers, dispatching workers to the various employers as needed. This development was resisted by employers, who launched a lockout of all painters and dockers in the Port of Newcastle, but agreement was reached in the Commonwealth Arbitration Court in 1946 allowing the practice to continue.

The roster was operated out of the branch office of the union in each port, which acted as a hiring hall. Members were allocated jobs each morning based on how long they had been waiting for work. Refusal to accept a job meant the member would lose his position in the allocation order. Employers retained the right to determine the number of workers required, and to reject any workers they thought unsuitable.

The dangerous and difficult nature of the work, as well as the small and close-knit nature of the workforce, encouraged strong union organisation amongst the painters and dockers and the FSPDU developed a reputation for militancy. For example, despite representing only 15 percent of the workforce in the shipbuilding and ship repair industry the FSPDU was involved in 40 percent of all industrial disputes between 1975 and 1978. The FSPDU was also notable for being the only union in Australia after 1976 to have more than 5 percent of its members in the shipbuilding and ship repair industry.

=== Decline ===
The FSPDU faced a decline in membership during the late 20th century as mechanisation (including sandblasting and spray painting) and the decline of Australian commercial shipbuilding reduced the number of jobs available. By the late 1970s membership of the union had fallen to approximately 2000, although the union actively defended the work of its members through competition with other unions over coverage, being involved in a high proportion of all demarcation disputes in the shipbuilding industry. As work declined in the industry, employers began to seek the removal of the union roster system, provoking an eleven-week strike at the Garden Island dockyard in Sydney in 1976 and a sixteen-week dispute in Newcastle in 1978. Both disputes ended with the union retaining the right to operate the roster.

== Alleged criminality and deregistration ==
In the 1960s and 1970s the union was alleged to have criminal connections.

In 1980 the union was subject to the Costigan Commission (officially entitled the Royal Commission on the activities of the Federated Ship Painters and Dockers Union), enquiring into its involvement with organised crime and tax evasion.

The union was de-registered in 1993. Despite widespread allegations of criminality, the reason the union was de-registered was because it had fewer than 1,000 members. After the Industrial Relations Act 1988 was passed by the Hawke Government unions with fewer than 1,000 members had to show why, in the public interest, their existence should continue. Whilst the Dockers opposed the de-registration on principle it could not advance an argument to continue its existence, taking the Act into account. Before de-registration members of the Dockers had been transferred to what are now the Maritime Union of Australia and the AMWU.

Several prominent former members were involved in the Melbourne gangland killings. Lewis Moran and Graham Kinniburgh were both former members and met on the Melbourne waterfront.

== See also ==
- Costigan Commission
- Bottom of the harbour tax avoidance
