= Mark Moran (criminal) =

Australian organized crime figure

- Born: Mark Anthony John Cole; 4 July 1964
- Died: 15 June 2000 (aged 35); Aberfeldie, Victoria, Australia
- Occupations: Mobster, Personal trainer, pastry cook
- Known for: Participant in the Melbourne gangland killings
- Children: 2
- Parent(s): Leslie Cole (father); Judy Moran (mother); Lewis Moran (stepfather)
- Relatives: Jason Moran (half brother)
- Status: Murdered
- Allegiance: The Carlton Crew

Mark Anthony John Moran (né Cole, 4 July 1964 – 15 June 2000) was an Australian organized crime figure of the Moran family from Melbourne, Victoria, notable for its involvement in the illegal drug trade and the Melbourne gangland killings. Moran, aged 35, was shot dead outside his Aberfeldie home, allegedly by Carl Williams, just after 8 pm on 15 June 2000.

== Personal life ==
Mark Moran was the son of Judy Moran and Leslie John "Johnny" Cole,. Cole was shot dead in Sydney on 10 November 1982 during drug-related gangland wars while working for crime boss Frederick "Paddles" Anderson. His stepfather was criminal Lewis Moran and his half-brother was drug trafficker Jason Moran, both of whom were also murdered.

== In popular culture ==
In the local Australian TV drama series Underbelly Mark Moran was played by actor Callan Mulvey.

== See also ==
- List of unsolved murders (2000–present)
