= Carl Williams (criminal) =

Australian murderer and drug trafficker

- Williams leaving the Supreme Court in May 2004
- Born: Carl Anthony Williams; 13 October 1970; Melbourne, Victoria, Australia
- Died: 19 April 2010 (aged 39); HM Prison Barwon, Lara, Victoria, Australia
- Cause of death: Homicide (bludgeoning)
- Occupation: Mobster
- Known for: Participant in the Melbourne gangland killings
- Spouse: Roberta Mercieca (m. 2001)
- Children: 4, including Dhakota Williams
- Parents: George Williams (father); Barbara Williams (mother)
- Status: Deceased; murdered in custody
- Allegiance: The Carlton Crew (Until 2000); The Williams Family (2000-2007)
- Motive: Melbourne gangland killings
- Criminal charges: Murder × 4; Conspiracy to murder
- Penalty: Life imprisonment × 2; 35-year non-parole period

Williams Gang
- Years active: 2000-2007
- Territory: Melbourne
- Ethnicity: White Australians
- Membership: ca.20 members
- Activities: drug trafficking, contract killings
- Allies: Sunshine Crew, Mokbel Network
- Rivals: The Carlton Crew, Moran family, Radev Gang, P.o.W Gang

Carl Anthony Williams (13 October 1970 – 19 April 2010) was an Australian convicted murderer and drug trafficker from Melbourne, Victoria. He was a central figure in the Melbourne gangland killings as well as their final victim.

He was sentenced to life imprisonment with a non-parole period of 35 years for ordering the murders of three people and conspiracy to murder a fourth (which was unsuccessful). On 19 April 2010, while incarcerated at HM Prison Barwon, Williams was beaten to death with the stem of an exercise bike by another inmate, Matthew Charles Johnson.

Williams enlisted the help of others willing to perform the contract killings in exchange for large payments of cash. At the time of his death, he was in the maximum-security Acacia unit of HM Prison Barwon near Geelong. Williams would have been 71 before he was eligible for consideration of parole.

== Early life ==
Williams attended Broadmeadows Technical School, leaving in Year 11. Williams spent much of his childhood in Western Melbourne with his friends and older brother Shane who died of a heroin overdose in 1997. He was married to convicted drug trafficker Roberta Mercieca (born 23 March 1969), with whom he had one daughter, Dhakota Williams born 10 March 2001. Williams held various labouring jobs before opening a children's clothing store in partnership with his wife, which eventually failed.

On 25 November 1999, Williams, along with his father George and another associate, were arrested and charged with drug trafficking after a raid on an illegal drug factory that had been set up in a unit located in Fir Close, Broadmeadows. In excess of 25,000 amphetamine tablets were seized by police, estimated to be worth up to A$20 million.

Williams, who described himself as a semi-professional gambler, was banned from the Crown Casino on 2 April 2004 by police commissioner Christine Nixon under the Casino Control Act.

Williams's mother Barbara Williams was found dead in her Melbourne home on 22 November 2008, having overdosed on unspecified drugs in an act of suicide. She had been suffering from depression.

== Melbourne gangland killings ==
On 13 October 1999, Williams was shot in the abdomen by Jason Moran as he owed the Moran family $80,000. This event sparked a lengthy underworld war known as the Melbourne gangland killings. In 2002, after meeting through a mutual friend, Tony Mokbel, Williams courted the services of the murderer Andrew Veniamin as his right-hand man until early 2004.

=== Mark Moran ===
Mark Moran was shot on 15 June 2000 after arriving at his home in Aberfeldie. Williams was due to stand trial for his murder, but the charge was dropped when he pleaded guilty to other murders.

=== Jason Moran ===
On the Saturday morning of 21 June 2003, Jason Moran and a colleague, Pasquale Barbaro, were fatally shot in the parking lot of the Cross Keys Hotel in Strathmore, Melbourne, where Moran and Barbaro had brought five children to attend an Auskick football clinic.

The clinic had just finished, and many adults and children were standing around. Moran and Barbaro sat in the front seats of Moran's minivan—with the five young children sitting in the rear—a gunman approached and fired both a shotgun and a handgun into the vehicle. Both men died at the scene. Three years earlier, a shotgun and a handgun had been used to gun down Moran's half-brother Mark. Two of the children in the minivan were Moran's, and all were age 7 or under.

The gunman—nicknamed "The Runner" before he was identified as Victor Brincat—later told police that Carl Williams was the person who paid him to kill Moran and Barbaro, and that Williams had paid him less than the $100,000 fee he was originally promised. Williams later pleaded guilty to the murder of Jason Moran.

=== Mark Mallia ===
Mark Mallia was an associate of murdered underworld criminal, Nik Radev. At 8:05 a.m. on 18 August 2003 a fire was reported in a stormwater drain in Sunshine. Fire brigade members attending to the fire recovered a wheelie bin containing the remains of a charred body inside, later identified as Mallia.

=== Michael Marshall ===
Marshall was shot outside his luxury South Yarra home in front of his five-year-old son on 25 October 2003.

=== Lewis Moran ===
Lewis Moran was fatally shot in the inner-city Brunswick Club on 31 March 2004. Williams pleaded guilty to his murder.

== Arrest and confession ==
On 28 February 2007, Williams pleaded guilty in the Supreme Court of Victoria to the murders of Lewis Moran, his son Jason Moran, and Mark Mallia (whose name was initially suppressed by the court).

Williams also pleaded guilty to conspiracy to murder gangland rival Mario Condello. A suppression order prevented the media from reporting this until the day of sentencing. Under a deal with police, Williams was not charged for his alleged involvement in orchestrating the murder of Mark Moran, Jason Moran's half-brother.

It was also revealed that Williams was serving a sentence of 21 years for the 2003 murder of Michael Marshall. The outcome of this trial had previously been suppressed.

== Summary of criminal convictions ==
Date	Conviction	Sentence	Notes
May 1990	Handling stolen goods; Possession of stolen property; Failing to answer bail	Fined $400	
March 1993	Criminal damage; Throwing a missile	Sentenced to 150 hours' community work	
December 1994	Attempting to traffic in a drug of dependence	Sentenced to 12 months' imprisonment (six months suspended for a period of two years)	
29 October 2004	Drug trafficking	Sentenced to 7 years' imprisonment	
19 July 2006	Murder of Michael Marshall	Sentenced to 27 years' imprisonment; 21-year non-parole period	
7 May 2007	Murder of Jason Moran	Sentenced to life imprisonment	
7 May 2007	Murder of Mark Mallia	Sentenced to life imprisonment	
7 May 2007	Murder of Lewis Moran	Sentenced to 25 years' imprisonment	
7 May 2007	Conspiracy to murder Mario Condello	Sentenced to 25 years' imprisonment	

== School fees revelation ==
On 19 April 2010 News Limited newspapers including the Herald Sun revealed that Victoria Police were paying $8,000 in school fees for Williams's daughter, Dhakota. The reason for the payment was not revealed at the time. Later, during the 2011 murder trial, it was revealed Williams had turned informant and had struck a deal with Assistant Commissioner Simon Overland. Specifically, the belief was that the Victorian Police paid for Dhakota's private schooling on behalf of her father in return for his co-operation as an informant while in prison.

Williams gave information on several unsolved murder cases believed to have involved corrupt officers and it was also revealed his murderer may have been implicated in at least one of those cases. Williams's lawyer Rob Stary said Williams was upset about the publication of the story.

There was speculation that the police may have agreed to pay the school fees in exchange for information and that publication of the story may have led to Williams's death. The Herald Sun defended its publication of the story.

Significant public attention to Dhakota arose from this unusual arrangement between the Victorian Police and her family.

== Family ==
=== Dhakota Williams ===
Dhakota Williams is Williams' daughter, who has become an Australian public figure. Dhakota is often described in the media as a 'gangland heiress'.

In recent years, Dhakota's personal life has been a frequent topic of Australian news media headlines. Her first notable media attention began after an arrangement emerged between the Victorian Police and her family to pay for her private school fees whilst Carl Williams was in prison. In late 2022, she joined the adult website OnlyFans, bringing further media attention to her.

=== Stepchildren ===
Williams had three stepchildren from his marriage to Roberta Mercieca. In September 2024, his stepdaughter Breanane Stephens commenced legal action against the Victorian state government over Williams' death in custody.

== Death ==
On 19 April 2010, Williams died from a head injury while incarcerated at Barwon Prison. He was bludgeoned to death with the stem of an exercise bike seat by another inmate, Matthew Charles Johnson, who was convicted of the murder and sentenced to 32 years in jail in December 2011.

Williams's funeral was held on 30 April 2010 at St Therese's Catholic Church in Essendon. He was buried in a golden coffin. In January 2011 it was reported that Williams's resting place consisted of a nameless plot, without a headstone.

The circumstances of his death were investigated by the Victorian Ombudsman. A report critical of Corrections Victoria (for approving Williams to share a cell with Johnson) was released in April 2012. Two months later in June 2012, the Department of Justice Secretary Penny Armytage resigned and earlier in May the Corrections Victoria Commissioner Bob Hastings had resigned. In 2019, during the Royal Commission into the Management of Police Informants, former Deputy Commissioner (Crime) for Victoria Police Sir Kenneth Lloyd Jones made a written submission stating his belief that prison staff were involved with the death of Williams.

== In popular culture ==
Williams was portrayed by Gyton Grantley in the 2008 Australian television series Underbelly, based on the events surrounding the Melbourne gangland wars from 1995 up to his arrest in 2004. In 2014 Grantley reprised the role in Fat Tony & Co., and again in 2020 in Informer 3838.
