= Royal Commission into the Management of Police Informants =

Victorian Royal Commission

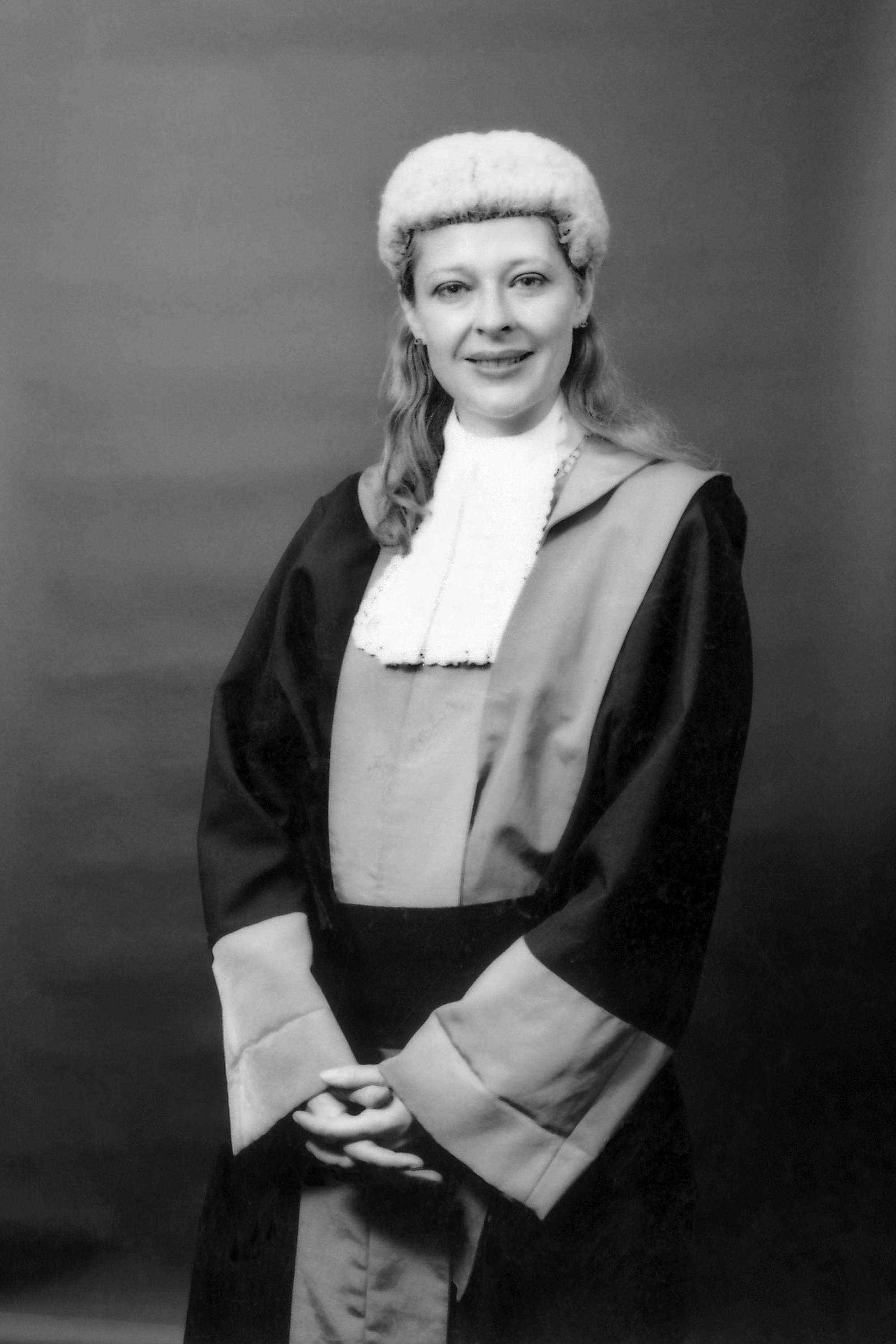
Portrait of Commissioner Judge Margaret McMurdo AC FAAL

The Royal Commission into the Management of Police Informants – An inquiry into Victoria Police's use of Nicola Gobbo as a human source, referred to in the press as Lawyer X Royal Commission, was a royal commission in Victoria, Australia set up to examine the actions of Nicola Gobbo and Victoria Police whilst Gobbo, also referred to as Informer 3838 (Victoria Police), Lawyer X (media), and EF (litigation), was working as a lawyer and acting as a registered informer. It was announced on 3 December 2018, in response to the High Court AB v CD; EF v CD judgement, and was established on 13 December 2018 under Hon Margaret McMurdo to examine the adequacy and effectiveness of the processes of Victoria Police for the recruitment, handling and management of human sources who are subject to legal obligations of confidentiality or privilege and the effect of using such sources on past cases.

The commission delivered its final report and recommendations to the Governor of Victoria on 30 November 2020. In response, the Victorian Government appointed Sir David Carruthers to the role of Royal Commission Implementation Monitor and Geoffrey Nettle, who was one of the High Court justices who had decided AB v CD; EF v CD, to the position of Special Investigator.

== Background ==
On 31 March 2014 an article written by Anthony Dowsley was published in the Herald Sun which outlined, without going into detail, the role of Gobbo, under the pseudonym Lawyer X, in assisting Victoria Police by providing information. This article was followed the next day by a second story which stated that "A police taskforce into multiple murders was shut down to protect a high-profile lawyer used as an informer" and an editorial stating that "Premier Napthine has no alternative but to order a royal commission". Then, on 2 April 2014, a court injunction stopped publication of follow up articles as Victoria Police argued that there was a high risk of Gobbo and her children being killed. The Herald Sun responded to the injunction with a front page editorial article about the efforts of Victoria Police to stop publication of information relating to Gobbo's actions.

The articles that had been published in the Herald Sun helped trigger an internal review within Victoria Police, called Operation Bendigo, which documented "five possible legal conflicts" and remained a secret until December 2018, and a review by the Director of Public Prosecutions. At this time it is estimated that between legal and police personnel several hundred knew at least something about the actions of Gobbo.

=== Kellam Review ===
On 14 July 2014 the Independent Broad-based Anti-corruption Commission (IBAC) appointed former Victorian Supreme Court Justice Murray Kellam AO KC to undertake an enquiry, called Operation Leven, into Victoria Police human source management. After examining 14 witnesses under oath including Gobbo's police handlers, and reviewing more than 5500 documents, but without inviting Gobbo to give evidence, Kellam presented a confidential report to IBAC in February 2015 which found a high order of negligence in the handling of human sources by Victoria Police. The report directed Victoria Police to provide a copy of the report to the Director of Public Prosecutions (DPP) and recommended that Victoria Police and the DPP investigate the impact of Gobbo's actions on criminal convictions. In response to the report acting Chief Commissioner Tim Cartwright said that "There is no evidence at this stage of any threat to any conviction or any evidence of mistrial", however legal arguments in 2016 relating to a Herald Sun article about the appeals of Rob Karam, Victoria Police confirmed that the Kellam review concluded police used information from an informer which may have affected one or more trials, stating:

The use of information provided by a police informer or informers may have compromised the fair trial of criminals such as Rob Karam.

— Kellam Review

In October 2014 Gobbo wrote a letter to Commissioner Ken Lay which was followed by an additional letter to Assistant Commissioner Steve Fontana in June 2015 in which she stated the impact that the case had taken on her "mental, emotional and physical health ... including anxiety, fear, severe depression, PTSD and paranoia".

In 2016 it was claimed that documents had been withheld from the enquiry by Victoria Police but the complaint was dismissed and during the Royal Commission it was stated that IBAC had not looked into the impact of Gobbo's actions on criminal cases as part of their review.

=== Supreme Court case ===
After the completion of the Kellam Review, the DPP concluded that there was an obligation to inform some of Gobbo's former clients of her actions but on 10 June 2016, Victoria Police commenced proceedings in the Victorian Supreme Court to stop those affected by her actions being notified. Victoria Police argued that it was against the public interest for them to be told and would almost certainly cause EF's (i.e. Gobbo's) death. The case was dismissed in June 2017 by Justice Timothy Ginnane.

=== AB v CD; EF v CD judgement and aftermath ===
After Gobbo and Victoria Police lost their case in the Supreme Court they unsuccessfully appealed to the Court of Appeal who dismissed their appeal in November 2017 following which they appealed to the High Court who dismissed the appeal in their November 2018 judgement AB v CD; EF v CD.

In December 2018, in response to the AB v CD; EF v CD judgment, it was revealed that Lawyer X (referred to as EF in the litigation and now known to be Nicola Gobbo) received about $3 million by way of a settlement, after an initial claim of $30 million, plus miscellaneous other payments from Victoria Police for providing information to police about her clients whilst she was representing them. It is generally accepted that this agreement was made in an effort to deal with the Melbourne gangland killings. Gobbo claimed to have helped in the arrest and conviction of 386 people. Chief Commissioner Graham Ashton, himself defended by the Police Minister Lisa Neville, defended the action of police and said that the use of Informer 3838 was a necessary weapon in an escalating war on Melbourne's streets. In March 2019, Ashton said "Over the preceding 12 months, numerous people had been murdered, some in very public locations and high-profile criminals were vying for control of drug operations that were inflicting serious harm on the Victorian community, It was accordingly a desperate and dangerous time".

=== Announcement of Royal Commission ===
Shortly after the release of the judgment prosecutors at the state and federal level contacted an initial 22 people letting them know that grounds may exist for them to appeal their conviction with Premier of Victoria Daniel Andrews saying that the Royal Commission would determine how many convictions might be affected.

Victorian defence lawyer Zarah Garde-Wilson stated that she had been arguing for a Royal Commission since she learnt of the actions of Lawyer X in 2014. After taking 2 years to gather information Garde-Wilson filed an appeal in 2016 leading to the outcome in 2018.

After the suppression orders relating to the judgement were lifted, in which Gobbo informing Victoria Police about her clients was called a "fundamental and appalling breach" of her obligations by the High Court, Premier Andrews announced the Royal Commission shortly afterwards. As well as working with media advisers to keep information about Gobbo out of the spotlight, Victoria Police revealed that they had spent a total of $4.52 million attempting to keep the co-operation with Gobbo secret. In defending the money and effort spent attempting to keep the work of Gobbo secret Ashton stated "At all times when handling these matters our absolute concern has been for the protection of the lawyer and their family, who Victoria Police believed would be murdered if this information was released."

The Premier of Victoria appointed Margaret McMurdo, former president of the Queensland Court of Appeal, and former South Australian Police Commissioner Malcolm Hyde as commissioners with Chris Winneke KC, Andrew Woods and Megan Tittensor as counsel assisting the commission .

== Terms of reference ==
The terms of reference of the Royal Commission were as follows:

The Royal Commission into the Management of Police Informants is appointed to inquire into and report on:

1. The number of, and extent to which, cases may have been affected by the conduct of EF as a human source.
2. The conduct of current and former members of Victoria Police in their disclosures about and recruitment, handling and management of EF as a human source.
3. The current adequacy and effectiveness of Victoria Police's processes for the recruitment, handling and management of human sources who are subject to legal obligations of confidentiality or privilege, including:
  1. whether Victoria Police's practices continue to comply with the recommendations of the Kellam report; and
  2. whether the current practices of Victoria Police in relation to such sources are otherwise appropriate.
4. The current use of human source information in the criminal justice system from human sources who are subject to legal obligations of confidentiality or privilege, subject to section 123 of the Inquiries Act 2014, including:
  1. the appropriateness of Victoria Police's practices around the disclosure or non-disclosure of the use of such human sources to prosecuting authorities; and
  2. whether there are adequate safeguards in the way in which Victoria Police prosecutes summary cases, and the Office of Public Prosecutions prosecutes indictable matters on behalf of the Director of Public Prosecutions, when the investigation has involved human source material.
5. Recommended measures that may be taken to address:
  1. the use of any other human sources who are, or have been, subject to legal obligations of confidentiality or privilege and who come to your attention during the course of your inquiry; and
  2. any systemic or other failures in Victoria Police's processes for its disclosures about and recruitment, handling and management of human sources who are subject to legal obligations of confidentiality or privilege, and in the use of such human source information in the broader criminal justice system, including how those failures may be avoided in future.
6. Any other matters necessary to satisfactorily resolve the matters set out in paragraphs 1-5.

— "Terms of reference of the Royal Commission into the Management of Police Informants" (PDF).

The initial terms of reference were expanded after information provided by Victoria Police indicated that a wider investigation was required.

== Taskforce Landow ==
After the Royal Commission was announced Victoria Police created the 117 person Taskforce Landow which sits under the Specialist Operations executive command which is led by Deputy Commissioner Wendy Steendam. The taskforce was set up to manage the response of Victoria Police to the Royal Commission and was larger than the Purana Taskforce at the peak of the gangland war or the family violence command. One of the responsibilities of the taskforce was to retrieve documents of interest to the Royal Commission from the Archive Services Centre. The taskforce was led by Commander Paul Millet who was awarded the Australian Police Medal (APM) in the 2021 Australia Day Honours.

The resources dedicated to the taskforce caused delays in other cases due to the level of resources that were being assigned.

== Enquiry ==
In February 2019 Malcolm Hyde was disqualified as commissioner, leaving McMurdo as sole commissioner for the length of the enquiry, after it was discovered that Gobbo had been a periodic paid informer for Victoria Police since 1993 which included a period when Hyde was working there. At the same time it was revealed that up to 6 other legal professionals are still acting as informants. Victoria Police also provided information listing court clerks, legal secretaries, solicitors and a non registered self-proclaimed legal professional as people who appeared in their files regarding previous information provided. Details were not, however, provided for an additional practicing lawyer who was providing information to police due as they were a murder suspect at the time.

In addition, former lawyer Joseph Acquaro, who was shot to death in March 2016, had given Victoria Police information on his former client Francesco “Frank” Madafferi. At that time Victoria Police stated that, of these legal professionals, there was only one possible case of unethical behaviour. In May 2020 it was reported that the number of legal professionals being investigated by the Royal Commission was now "at least a dozen", of which 2 were judges, including some that provided information during the period 2014–2016 whilst police were dealing with the consequences of working with Gobbo.

The Victoria Police legal team initially included Brendan Murphy KC, the inaugural Victorian Public Interest Monitor, however Murphy was removed from the role after raising concerns with the extent of public interest immunity claims. Saul Holt KC appeared for Victoria Police.

Due to the importance of the Royal Commission, Victoria Legal Aid created a scheme for those given notice to appear or granted leave to appeal, whereby they would provide for legal fees for appearances before the enquiry but not for the preparation of submissions or for civil or criminal cases arising out of the Royal Commission. Additionally, it was disclosed that Gobbo's legal fees, including Peter Collinson KC, were being paid for by the Victorian Government.

A call for public submissions was made on 7 February 2019 ahead of the inaugural hearing on 15 February 2019. Public hearings into the conduct of Gobbo and Victoria Police occurred over the period 14 March 2019 to 21 February 2020 and hearing into policy and practice over the period 7 May to 13 May 2020.

=== Issues with disclosure and restriction ===
Hearings were complicated by the extensive use of over 100 pseudonyms for informers, criminals and police which, combined with a suppression order, were needed to protect the identity and safety of those involved. During testimony Victoria Police were represented by Justin Hannebery KC and Renee Enbom who frequently called for information to be suppressed with around 370 exclusion or non-disclosure orders in operation. Additionally, lawyers for some of Gobbo's clients were restricted from certain sessions and information was only made available via redacted transcripts vetted by Victoria Police.

The Victorian Inquiries Act, under which Royal Commissions in Victoria are constituted, gives police control over how Public Interest Immunity (or PII) is applied, which complicated an enquiry called after Victoria Police failed in their court bids to keep their interactions with Gobbo secret. In response to the extensive use of public interest immunity claims and the difficulties involved in keeping track of what information was public knowledge and pseudonyms, including those which changed multiple times during the Royal Commission, McMurdo commented that "It is a bit Kafkaesque, isn't it?". One of the reported reasons for introducing multiple pseudonyms was to ensure that there was no connection between allegations against and allegations by certain individuals. The master list of pseudonyms, called Exhibit 81, was distributed to a limited group each morning before being retrieved each evening.

During hearings McMurdo raised concerns about the level of openness shown by Victoria Police as document metadata showed that they had discovered documents several months before providing them.

=== Hearings ===
Hearings began on 15 February 2019 with public hearings beginning on 14 March with the evidence of a Victoria Police officer who appeared under a pseudonym.

==== Neil Paterson ====
Over the period 27-29 March 2019 Assistant Commissioner Neil Paterson testified that as far back as November 1997, before Gobbo's second period as an informer for Victoria Police, she was described by as being too eager and a loose cannon. Regardless of these concerns Gobbo was registered as an informer in May 1999 although her registration did not indicate that she was a lawyer. Patterson also testified that even though handlers raised concern in 2008 and Gobbo was officially deregistered as an informer on 12 January 2009, Victoria Police didn't seek legal advice on the matter until August 2011. During Paterson's testimony it was disclosed that information obtained via Gobbo was still being used even whilst Gobbo was suing Victoria Police. Whilst Paterson was testifying Winneke questioned him regarding the "significant history" of the relationship between Dale and Gobbo which was left out of his statement to the Royal Commission.

Paterson's 71 page written submission was provided to the Royal Commission on 25 March 2019 and contained numerous redactions as did many of the attachments. These redactions, combined with four folders of un-tabled supporting evidence and the confidential Comrie report, caused lawyers for some of those involved to raise concerns about procedural fairness. There was also discussion during Paterson's testimony of the difficulty of only providing information upon request when Victoria Police was responsible for deciding which evidence to present.

==== Paul Dale ====
The Royal Commission heard evidence that whilst Paul Dale, a former friend, lover and client of Gobbo, was facing drugs charges in 2003 he was in constant contact with Gobbo which included providing her with extensive hand written notes which she then passed on to Victoria Police. Paul Dale was later charged with the murder of police informer Terence Hodson based on information provided by Gobbo and Carl Williams but the charges were dropped when Gobbo, known as Witness F by the prosecution, refused to testify and Williams was killed in jail.

Dale testified that he believed that Simon Overland had ordered the use of Gobbo to convict him.

==== Stuart Bateson ====
On 1-2 July, 19-22, 28 November and 2 December 2019, Victoria Police Commander Stuart Bateson appeared before the Royal Commission and responded during questioning that he did not believe the role of representing criminals and being a police informer were incompatible. Although Bateson admitted that it was "a bit murky" being a human source whilst representing someone after previously representing the key witness against them and they have an absolute right to legal representation, he did not agree that people were entitled to independent legal representation.

Bateson also admitted destroying an unsigned draft witness statement after the witness altered what they told police citing security reasons and did not tell the court that their evidence had changed. In response, counsel assisting queried the significance of a witness changing their statement from "I didn't think it was going to be a murder" to "I think there was going to be a murder" after a visit from Gobbo who had been sceptical of the truth of the statement, to which to which Bateson replied "when I'm getting asked questions in the witness box ... it's clear that the final product is the only product."

==== Sandy White (pseudonym) ====
Officer Sandy White, Gobbo's former handler and head of the Source Development Unit appeared under a pseudonym on 30–31 July, 1–2 August and 5–8 August 2019.

During his time in the stand the recording of a phone conversation between Gobbo and White was played to the Royal Commission. The September 2005 conversation was recorded even though Gobbo expressed concern about being recorded and was told that she wasn't being recorded at that time.

White also talked about the mid 2000s case of a client of Gobbo who was arrested for drug trafficking after she provided information that led to their arrest. Due to the conflict of interest Victoria Police ordered Gobbo to stop acting for them. White said that when Gobbo failed to comply, he considered arresting her due to the possibility that she might be perverting the course of justice but felt that there were insufficient grounds.

Gobbo's lawyer Peter Collinson asked White a series of questions about their perspective on her motivation for becoming a police informant. During testimony the 2006 arrest of several of Tony Mokbel's associates who Gobbo provided information on to help in their arrest and whom she planned to represent even though it went against her handler's wishes was discussed. In the weeks following the arrests consideration was given to ending her role as an informer and providing her with a reward along with psychological counselling. This led to a 17 May 2006 meeting between Simon Overland and two of Gobbo's handlers where these options were discussed and noted however in the end her registration as an informer continued until 2009.

It was also disclosed that Gobbo suggested improvements to the deception case against Zaharoula Mokbel after warning that the brief of evidence in the case was weak. In talking about this, White agreed that it was legally privileged and it was not appropriate to be passed on.

In summary White said that "I think the relationship with Victoria Police has been a disaster for her".

==== Gavin Ryan ====
Former Victoria Police detective Gavan Ryan, who headed the investigation into the murders of Terrence and Christine Hodson, appeared before the Royal Commission on 9 and 13-15 August 2019.

==== James (Jim) O’Brien ====
In early September 2019 transcripts from an August 2008 meeting between Gobbo and her handlers were discovered and tabled at the Royal Commission in which she claimed that she had gone into the offices of the Purana Taskforce, headed at that time by former Victoria Police Detective Inspector James (Jim) O’Brien, and changed the statements of an unnamed witness who was integral to multiple convictions including that of Carl Williams and Faruk Orman. Gobbo believed that the changes to statements were done at the request of O'Brien or one of the senior handlers but in testimony on 3–6 and 9–10 September 2019 he both denied any knowledge of the plan and expressed some doubt about Gobbo's account of what happened. O'Brien did not give an opinion on whether the actions amounted to an attempt to pervert the course of justice but admitted that it was wrong, he should have been told and it should never have happened.

==== Boris Buick ====
Inspector Boris Buick of Victoria Police, the policeman who managed the prosecution of Faruk Orman, testified on 29–30 October, 1 and 11–12 November 2019. Buick testified that the Purana task force was concentrating on solving murders rather than being concerned with the ethics.

==== Thomas (Luke) Cornelius ====
Assistant Commissioner Thomas (Luke) Cornelius appeared before the Royal Commission on 12 December 2019 and 23–24, 29–30 January 2020 and answered questions about the $30 million that Gobbo gave as a figure she felt that she deserved whilst she was moving from being an informer to being a witness in the Dale case. She based this figure on the $80 million of seizures that she claimed to be responsible for and tried to get Simon Overland to intervene on her behalf.

==== Graham Ashton ====
When the Royal Commission was first announced the Victorian Premier said that he did not think that Current Victoria Police Commissioner Graham Ashton was involved in handling of Gobbo. In June 2019, in response to criticism by McMurdo relating to the withholding of 1,000 documents that Victoria Police had not deemed relevant, Ashton denied that there was an attempt to frustrate the Royal Commission and mentioned that they were spending $1.5 million per month on legal and support costs. Materials of interest to the Royal Commission were made available by Victoria Police throughout the hearings including 38 hours of phone intercepts, some containing Gobbo, which were provided in late April 2020 after all of the appearances of those directly involved had been completed.

Ashton, like others appearing before the Royal Commission, told the enquiry that he did not keep notes regarding the role of Gobbo. Ashton, who was previously head of the police watchdog, testified over the period 9–11 December 2019 that he would not have wanted to know that Gobbo was an informer whilst working in the watchdog role as it did not relate to misconduct or corruption. Ashton also stated that he first became aware of the role of Gobbo as an informer in 2007 although he was unaware of her earlier periods as an informer until the Royal Commission. Winneke suggested, based on diary notes, that Overland had told actually told Ashton one year earlier. whilst they were about to interview Gobbo about corruption allegations although Ashton had no memory of it. During testimony, the 2011 action of then Deputy Commissioner Ashton in ordering an internal investigation as a response to several court cases involving Gobbo was discussed including the fact that Ashton did not notify prosecutors or defence lawyers. At the Royal Commission Ashton claimed that reporting it to his bosses discharged his responsibilities in the matter.

Whilst in front of the commission Aston denied that the Office of Police Integrity, which he headed at the time, and Victoria Police had a "convenient relationship" to keep Gobbo from appearing before the OPI. He also denied stopping taking diary notes as part of an agreement with Overton. He did however state that Ryan told him that Gobbo was a source in order to prevent that fact becoming public through the work of the OPI, something that Ashton said passed on to OPI director George Brouwer and Tony Fitzgerald who ended up questioning Gobbo.

Before his testimony on 11 December 2019 Ashton spoke to reporters and said that Victoria Police had been keeping Gobbo safe for 12 years and would continue to do so.

Ashton admitted that although the prosecutors from the commonwealth in the Tomato tins ecstasy case would normally have been told of the issues surrounding the case, known to Victoria Police to be tainted by their relationship with Gobbo since at least November 2011, they were not informed of the situation.

==== Christine Nixon ====
Former Victoria Police Commissioner Christine Nixon, who was Commissioner from 2001 to 2009, told the Royal Commission in December 2019 that she accepted broad responsibility for the practices that caused issues but she had no recollection of being told that Gobbo was a human source and only discovered the role of Gobbo when it become public in 2018 after previously thinking that Lawyer X was a different lawyer. Nixon stated that she had kept away from operational matters after the issues with Karry Milte but agreed that she should have been told of the role of Gobbo.

==== Ken Jones ====
During his testimony at the Royal Commission on 13 December 2019, former Deputy Commissioner (Crime) for Victoria Police Sir Kenneth Lloyd Jones who worked under Chief Commissioner Simon Overland, said of the handling of Gobbo that “It began as highly irregular and unethical and deteriorated over a number of years to something that was illegal and chaotic.” When he was initially made aware of the role of Gobbo he approached the Office of Police Integrity, a former Supreme Court justice and the Victorian Ombudsman in a failed attempt to initiate an investigation.

Jones also made a written submission to the Commission stating his belief that prison staff were involved in the Barwon Prison murder of Carl Williams which caused the collapse of the trial of Paul Dale for the murders of Terence and Christine Hodson.

==== Simon Overland ====
Former Victoria Police Commissioner Simon Overland appeared before the Royal Commission for 5 days from 16 December 2019 to 20 December 2019. Ashton headed Taskforce Purana which was set up in 2003 to investigate the Melbourne gangland killings.

Evidence presented prior to his testimony indicated that Overland sanctioned the use of Gobbo. During testimony Overland claimed that although using Gobbo as an informer was dangerous and put her at risk her life was already under threat due to her work acting as lawyer for Tony Mokbel and he was not aware that she was breaching legal requirements.

Overland admitted both that he was the most senior officer who knew about the role of Gobbo and police may have acted illegally in how information from Lawyer X whilst agreeing with the statement from a recording of Gobbo that "the ethics was f---ed".

Whilst Overland was testifying he was presented with the 2006 case of a drug cook who told Gobbo, their close friend and lawyer, the location of a drug lab which Gobbo proceeded to pass on to the police. Gobbo went on to represent the cook and encourage them to provide information on Mokbel whilst also advising police on how to obtain co-operation. In response Overland accepted that, even though he wasn't aware of the details at the time, he should have been due to the potential damage to the investigation.

Whilst in the stand the commission, Overland was presented with a document prepared for a meeting that he attended in January 2009 which detailed the consequences of the role of Gobbo being revealed. After stating that he had no recollection of having seen the document, Overton denied that wider knowledge of the contents, if true, would have had any impact on his upcoming promotion to Commissioner of Victoria Police.

After initially claiming that the Director of Public Prosecutions was kept informed of Gobbo's role in defending three killers who ended up implicating each other Overland admitted that the DPP was not informed of Gobbo's role as an informant. Overland also said that it was a common practice to not make notes about Gobbo due to concerns about the information becoming known. This matched with earlier testimony from Assistant Commissioner Cornelius and Chief Commissioner Graham Ashton who also stated that they did not take any notes relation to discussions about Gobbo. Overton also denied that he had kept work diaries, a fact officially confirmed by Taskforce Landow around the time hearings started, however the discovery of three diaries by taskforce police was announced on 20 December 2019 just hours before the Royal Commission wrapped up hearings for the year. The diaries were found after Overland's former chief of staff Shane Patton heard Overland's testimony and recalled that he had seen diaries whilst packing up Overland's office when he left Victoria Police.

Following the discovery of the diaries at the Archive Services Centre Overland returned to give additional evidence on 21 January 2020 and provided a 32 page statement changing the evidence that he had previously provided to the Royal Commission whilst downplaying the importance of their discovery. Whilst three diaries were discovered, a gap in coverage of October 2006 to November 2007 caused Overland to admit that a fourth diary may exist. Among the other changes presented was the claim that Christine Nixon had been informed of the recruitment of Gobbo on 29 September 2005 which contradicted her earlier evidence. Upon presentation of the new evidence about when Nixon was informed it was unclear if Nixon would be recalled to give additional evidence however Nixon ultimately only ended up appearing before the Royal Commission on 18 December 2019.

During his testimony Overland maintained that he was concerned about the use of Gobbo from the start and he instructed detectives and other staff not to use privileged information obtained by Gobbo even though such evidence appears to have been used.

==== Findlay (Fin) McRae ====
Findlay (Fin) McRae, the Executive Director of Legal Services for Victoria Police, appeared before the Royal Commission on 30–31 January and 3–5 February 2020 and claimed during testimony that within the legal profession the fact that there was a lawyer acting as a registered informer had become "an open secret" in 2010 and there was gossip that Gobbo was assisting police due to the lawsuit that Gobbo filed against Victoria Police over her handling in the Paul Dale case.

McRae stated that then Police Minister Bob Cameron was briefed in 2010 about the settlement given to Gobbo after she sued Victoria Police but may not have been told that she had been an informer. McRae also testified that in 2010 he met with Victorian Government Solicitor John Cain and director of the Office of Police Integrity Michael Strong to discuss the settlement of the civil case that Gobbo had submitted against Victoria Police in which Gobbo's role as an informed was discussed. Cain did not appear before the Royal Commission but said in a submitted statement that he did not have any knowledge of the role of Gobbo whilst he was Victorian Government Solicitor and was astounded when he found out about it in 2015.

McRae initially claimed that he worked "relentlessly" to expose Gobbo's actions before downplaying the claim the next day and also claiming that he was the one who exposed Gobbo's involvement with Victoria Police. McRae also said that he had hoped that IBAC would investigate the effect of Gobbo's actions including providing them with case studies but was told that they did not have a remit to investigate.

McRae stated that although he knew that Gobbo was an informer before then, it was not until 2012 that he discovered that Gobbo provided information on her own clients to Victoria Police when he helped start a review.

==== Nicola Gobbo ====
In August 2019 Gobbo's lawyer Peter Collinson told the commission that Gobbo was motivated to inform on her clients as she wanted "to do the right thing" and help put the Mokbel clan in jail and had no financial incentive to become an informant. This contrasted with the view of Ryan who claimed that Gobbo was motivated by feelings of guilt over the murders of Terrence and Christine Hodson although Officer White expressed scepticism at that theory and when she testified Gobbo summed up her reasoning as "Looking back, I wanted to belong".

After initially expressing a willingness to appear before the Royal Commission Gobbo applied to be excused from giving evidence on mental and physical health grounds. Whilst the application to be excused was waiting adjudication, and shortly after her lawyers said on 4 December 2019 that she was too unwell both physically and mentally, Gobbo, without telling her lawyers, flew overseas and provided an interview for the ABC current affairs program 7.30 which then aired on 10 December 2019. During the interview Gobbo denied betraying her clients and claimed that Victoria Police "fed her to the wolves" and claimed that it would take her "more than 1,000 hours" to provide a statement to the Royal Commission. Giving the interview caused McMurdo to question Gobbo's lawyers about giving the interview whilst arguing to be excused from appearing before the Royal Commission.

The application to be excused was ultimately denied in December 2019 with McMurdo ordering Gobbo to give evidence over the phone on 29 January 2020. McMurdo also said that she had no confidence that Gobbo would present evidence and ordered the release of phone transcripts of lengthy conversations, not taken under oath, between Gobbo and Royal Commission staff from earlier in March, April and June 2019.

After providing a 7 page document before appearing which included that statement that she 'always' wanted to assist the Royal Commission, Gobbo testified from an undisclosed location for 5 days finishing on 11 February 2020 via video link with only McMurdo able to see the video following a confidential submission asking to have her image concealed with some suggesting that she had changed her appearance since her interview with 7:30.

Whilst discussing the aftermath of a drug bust Gobbo admitted that she should have sought advice from the ethics committee of the Victorian Bar about representing both Azzam Ahmed and Abby Haynes whilst working with Haynes to provide information on Ahmed.

During parts of her time on the stand Gobbo was suffering from headaches and took painkillers to mitigate their effect.

Early on her first day of testimony Gobbo admitted to having a "drunken interlude" with a police officer with whom she discussed money laundering with and also stated that, contrary to the promise that she agreed to in an affidavit she swore as part of her application to practice law, she had failed to act with integrity in her actions as a lawyer.

Whilst talking about giving information to a police officer Gobbo argued that Not all those matters that I'm aware of because I'm acting as a lawyer are necessarily privileged.

Gobbo was asked about her interactions with Wayne Strawhorn, a Victoria Police officer who was later convicted of drug charges that she described as manipulative, and agreed that she should have known that it was improper to give him the information that she did but she was scared of him. Gobbo was also asked about the February 2003 arrest of police officer Steve Campbell, someone she had previously been in a relationship with and continued to see, for drug offences whilst representing as a client one of his co-accused who had originally agreed to give evidence against Campbell before changing their mind. Gobbo admitted that she should have disclosed the relationship but didn't because it did not come up.

During testimony Gobbo told the inquiry that she had no recollection of Mark Perry confessing involvement in arranging the murder of Shane Chartres-Abbott or of telling police offices Ron Iddles and Steve Waddell of the confession whilst being interviewed in Bali which led to the creation of an unsigned note from 2009 detailing the confession which was then given to the lawyers prosecuting Mark Perry but was not used during the court case. After initially having no recollection of the conversation even though "It's something you would think would stick in your mind", Gobbo conceded that she had told police after she was shown text messages claiming credit for it.

Gobbo also testified that the Mokbel family would speak openly in front of her including discussing drug deals and one of them vouched for Gobbo to their associates. She also mentioned saying to police that "If you people don't know what you're doing," she said to them, "I'll end up dead, and there will be a royal commission".

Gobbo testified that her handlers had asked for the phone used to contact them to be returned and if arrested or approached by Federal Police she was instructed not to talk to them.

Whilst talking about the fees that she charged those that she was reporting on to Victoria Police, Gobbo conceded that it was ethically wrong but did not concede that she was not entitled to the money or via her actions "obtain financial advantage or obtain money by deception". She also admitted that she had not considered the legality and police would have stopped her from doing it if it was wrong.

In February 2022 it was revealed that during 2020, whilst the Royal Commission was in progress, Victoria Police offered to pay for Gobbo to leave Australia for one of several countries that would allow her to avoid investigation and prosecution. Gobbo did not leave the country and Victoria Police denied that they had done or would do anything that could undermine the Royal Commission.

==== Ken Lay ====
Former Commissioner Ken Lay testified on 10 February 2020.

==== Paul Hollowood ====
On 12 February 2020 Victoria Police Superintendent Paul Hollowood appeared in front of the Royal Commission and claimed that he was excluded from meetings during 2008 once he asked if legal advice on the use of Gobbo had been sought. After being assured during a meeting, members of which included Graham Ashton, Simon Overland and Dannye Moloney, that it was legally sound Hollowood informed Moloney that he was worried that he did not have a full picture of what was being discussed. After speaking of his concerns that the committee was not providing proper oversight Hollowood also informed the Royal Commission that he was given guidance that this information should not be provided to the Royal Commission.

==== Ronald (Ron) Iddles ====
Former Detective Senior Sergeant Ronald (Ron) Iddles appeared before the Royal Commission on 13-14 February 2020. Prior to the start of the Royal Commission Iddles claimed to have no recollection of the unsigned 2009 note by Gobbo detailing the confession of Mark Perry, and then during initial testimony Iddles denied that the confession of Mark Perry was discussed during the Bali meetings even though Steve Waddell earlier expressed no doubt about the existence of the note. When presented evidence by counsel for Victoria Police at the Royal Commission, Iddles admitted that the confession existed.

==== Stephen (Steve) Leane ====
Former Assistant Commissioner Stephen (Steve) Leane of Victoria Police who was head of the professional standards command in 2014 when information about the role of Gobbo started becoming more widely know, appeared in front of the Royal Commission on 8 February 2020. Leane noted that none of the prior reviews of Gobbo's actions, including the one undertaken by IBAC in 2014, had considered what impact her actions would have on criminal convictions meaning that Victoria Police had been given the task of determining which cases had been affected by their actions.

==== Jeffrey (Jeff) Pope ====
During the first appearance of Former Assistant Commissioner Jeffrey (Jeff) Pope on 1-2 April 2019 he denied Gobbo's claim that he had been involved in a sexual relationship with her. Pope also appeared on 19 February 2020 when he denied claims of being the source of the 2014 leak that Gobbo was registered human source called Witness F in the Paul Dale case.

==== Under aliases ====
The following people appeared before the Royal Commission confidentially or under an alias with reports indicating that some people appeared under more than one pseudonym. (Note: Some of these aliases may refer to the same person.) The use of pseudonyms, along with associated redactions, limited the level and detail of public reporting.

- Officer Black (alias) – Victoria Police
- Officer Kruger (alias) – Victoria Police
- Confidential witness – Former Victoria Police
- Confidential witness – Registered GP
- Person 12 (alias) – Former client of Gobbo
- Officer Sandy White (alias) – Victoria Police
- Officer Paige (alias) – Victoria Police
- Officer Peter Smith (alias) – Victoria Police
- Officer Fox (alias) – Victoria Police
- Officer Green (alias) – Victoria Police
- Officer Richards (alias) – Victoria Police
- Mr Cooper (alias) – Former client of Gobbo
- Mr Bickley (alias) – Former client of Gobbo
- Mr Thomas (alias) – Former client of Gobbo

==== Other items for consideration ====
The commission also considered other professions who may have access to confidential information such as parliamentarians, journalists, priests and medical specialists.

==== Current policy and practice ====
On 7 May to 13 May 2020 the Royal Commission heard from Deputy Commissioner Wendy Steendam, Victoria Police and Professor Sir Jonathan (Jon) Murphy, Liverpool John Moores University, United Kingdom on the topic of current policy and practice.

During her testimony Steendam presented the Royal Commission with information on training and documents relating to managing human sources with a focus on those with legal obligations, expressing confidence in the cultural changes taking place within Victoria Police, and claiming that changes to process already implemented would prevent a situation like Gobbo from occurring again.

Murphy discussed the newly implemented policy of requiring lawyers, doctors, journalists or priests, that is those who might come into contact with legally privileged information, to be unanimously approved by the Victoria Police ethics committee before they are registered as an informer with an Assistant Commissioner taking ultimate responsibility for the decision. In particular Murphy was concerned that the new approach would not provide the same level of accountability that would be provided by making an individual responsible.

=== Opportunity for feedback ===
On 26 June 2020 counsel assisting the commission provided a copy of their submissions to those who may be affected to give them a chance to make a response. The submission of counsel assisting included allegations that several current and former members of Victoria Police had acted criminally however information on those involved including the crimes involved were redacted as it would unfairly prejudice the prospects of a fair trial.

Both the submissions and the responses were published on 1 September 2020 followed by the publishing of further submissions ahead of the delivery of the final report to the Victorian Government on 30 November 2020. The submissions released included claims of bias against counsel assisting and a lack of procedural fairness.

During September 2020 submissions from Gobbo and Overland to the Royal Commission were released. Gobbo's submission raised particular concerns around procedural fairness and argued that adverse findings would not be appropriate for any area that she was not questioned on. In Overland's submission, he accepted responsibility for Gobbo but claimed that she had no reason to single him out for attack and drew attention to Gobbo's statement that she was "out of her depth... and out of control."

The Office of Public Prosecutions made a submission which identified that prosecution of those identified by the Royal Commission requires a brief of evidence rather than just the findings of a Royal Commission saying "Any recommendation that an investigative agency consider any such offences is better effected by a direct referral to the agency itself".

There were Police submissions to the Royal Commission challenging the jurisdiction as well as raising the issues of procedural fairness and "hindsight bias" when it came to findings of misconduct against individual police.

=== Summary ===
In total the Royal Commission heard from 82 witnesses, including over 50 police officers, (Note: It is unclear if these numbers reflect the actual number of witnesses who appeared due to the practice of giving people more than one pseudonym.) during 129 days of public and private hearings with the full transcripts, barring redactions, of the Royal Commission published in December 2020 and available online.

After the enquiry finished McMurdo said that the welfare of Gobbo and her children was an item of concern throughout proceedings.

== Report and recommendations ==
Commissioner McMurdo found that the use of Ms Gobbo as a secret informer was a "systemic failure" and said the conduct by some officers could not have happened without "critical failures of leadership and governance in Victoria Police". Evidence of the systemic failure by Victoria Police can be seen in the fact that over 100 people within the organisation were aware of the role of Gobbo.

In her report McMurdo found that Overland didn't seek legal advice as it may have stopped the flow of information from Gobbo.

In particular McMurdo noted the opportunity that was lost to investigate the role of Gobbo when, whilst working at the Office of Police Integrity in 2007, Graham Ashton was aware of the role of Gobbo.

In 2018, a joint parliamentary inquiry report into how claims of police misconduct are investigated made 69 recommendations for reforming police oversight in the state.

The Royal Commission made a total of 111 recommendations. Of the recommendations 54 directed to the Victorian Government, 41 were directed to the Victoria Police with additional recommendations directed towards the Director of Public Prosecutions, Victorian Bar Council, Public Interest Monitor, the Independent Broad-based Anti-corruption Commission (IBAC), Law Institute of Victoria, Law Council of Australia, Legal Services Council, and Victorian Legal Services Board and Commissioner.

Some of the more notable recommendations include:

- If Victoria Police is the subject of a Royal Commission then they would not be in charge of deciding public interest immunity.
- The actions of both Victoria Police and Gobbo should be investigated with a view to disciplinary or criminal charges.
- The Royal Commission referred Findlay McRae, head of legal services for Victoria Police, to Victorian Legal Services Board and Commissioner for persistently failing in his duty to inform the Director of Public Prosecutions of Gobbo's informing due to a focus on the safety of Gobbo and the interests of Victoria Police.
- Mandatory reporting of suspected misconduct by legal professionals.
- An independent person should be appointed to investigate the 11 cases identified by Victoria Police where the source may have obligations with respect to confidentiality or privilege.

== Reaction ==
The information presented about Gobbo at the Royal Commission and elsewhere caused widespread comment with Melbourne University law professor Jeremy Gans declared that "Nothing to this extreme, that we know of, has happened anywhere in the world".

=== Police ===
Current and former Victoria Police acknowledged that Gobbo's informing should not have happened, argued that any failings were systemic, accepted without the reprehensibility of facilitating the actions of Gobbo, calling it a profound failure and indefensible interference whilst promising to provide evidence to appeals courts. Whilst police said "we've been totally been open in our disclosure", this was an issue that McMurdo raised in her closing remarks. Victoria Police also said that McRae "has the full support of Victoria Police" and that he "acquitted himself appropriately in the discharge of his responsibilities".

=== Criminals and their lawyers ===
After their convictions were overturned Orman called Victoria Police a "powerful, dangerous organisation", Cvetanovski described the actions of Gobbo and Victoria Police as "shocking, scandalous and unprecedented". and their attorney Ruth Parker called the actions of Gobbo and Victoria Police "the biggest criminal police-corruption conspiracy in the history of the Western world" and "typical corruption ... you only see in movies".

Lawyers for some of Gobbo's clients described the Royal Commission "the most difficult proceeding he's been a part of" due to the control that Victoria Police had over choosing what information was made available and what was covered by PII, called Gobbo's actions "mind blowing" and wondered why she would do something that "everybody had to know is very wrong".

=== Government and opposition ===
After the release of the report Attorney-General of Victoria Jill Hennessy said "What we've seen and learnt throughout this royal commission over the past two years is truly appalling" and promised to implement all of the recommendations whilst Shadow Attorney-General Edward O'Donohue said that Gobbo put the "integrity of the Victorian justice system at stake" and was described the record keeping of Victoria Police practicing "astounding and unacceptable" and the Victorian Legal Services Board and Commissioner Fiona McLeay noted the damage that Gobbo had done to the reputation of the legal profession and justice system.

=== Others ===
The President of the Victorian Bar, Matt Collins, called the allegations of what happened "wholly aberrant," the President of the Victorian Court of Appeal Justice Maxwell called the actions of Gobbo and others involved in her informing "disgraceful" and a "matter of profound importance" and former crown prosecutor in Victoria, Gavin Silbert, said that "It trashes the whole criminal-justice system" and "If people can't seek legal advice without being turned over, being betrayed by a legal practitioner, it's the fundamental root of the whole system we operate on." Other legal scholars argued that existing rules and restrictions need to be changed.

== Implementation of recommendations ==
Victoria Police established Taskforce Reset under Wendy Steendam to oversee their response to the issues raised in the Royal Commission.

To help with the implementation of the recommendations of the Royal Commission "The Police Informants Royal Commission Implementation Monitor Bill 2021" set up an independent statutory office called the independent Implementation Monitor with the power to oversee and report on the delivery of reforms by agencies responsible. This role is currently held by Sir David Carruthers, a lawyer who served as a judge of the New Zealand family and children's courts and as the chair of the New Zealand Independent Police Conduct Authority (IPCA).

The Attorney-General of Victoria tabled her first report to Parliament on the progress of implementation of the Royal Commission's recommendations for the period 30 November 2020 – 30 June 2021. The Attorney-General is required by legislation to table a progress report annually until implementation of the Royal Commission's recommendations is complete. The Attorney-General's report is informed by advice from the Implementation Monitor, who provided his first report to the Attorney-General in September 2021. The Attorney-General's first progress report focuses on the delivery of recommendations of the Royal Commission directed to government with three-month and six-month indicative delivery timeframes. It also provides an update on work underway by government to deliver longer-term recommendations.

On 20 June 2021 the Victorian Government announced the appointment of High Court justice Geoffrey Nettle, one of the justices who decided AB v CD; EF v CD, to the role of Special Investigator with responsibility for looking at the potential for disciplinary action and criminal charges for Gobbo and police officers past and present starting 19 July 2021. The Special Investigator Bill 2021 to officially create the Office of the Special Investigator (OSI), funded to the tune of provided $13.47 million, was introduced into parliament on 12 October 2021.

== References in popular culture ==
In February 2020 former drug squad detective Paul Dale released the book "Cops, Drugs, Lawyer X and Me" talking about his experiences being caught up in the Melbourne gangland wars for which he blamed corruption within Victoria Police.

Gabbo's story was dramaticized in the Underbelly TV franchise spin-off Informer 3838 which was first aired on 20 and 27 April 2020.

In September 2020 the book "Lawyer X" by Patrick Carlyon and Anthony Dowsley, both reporters from the Herald Sun, was published by HarperCollins presenting the story of the Melbourne Gangland Wars and the role that Gobbo played.

In 2020 Journalist Adam Shand released a 6 part podcast titled Understate: Lawyer X on Apple Podcasts.

The 9 episodes of season two of the ABC investigative podcast Trace covers the actions of Gobbo and includes interviews with her.

== After effects ==
As a consequence of the actions of Gobbo, as disclosed in AB v CD; EF v CD and the Royal Commission, there are multiple people who may have been denied a fair trial, with 124 convictions called tainted, others having their convictions reviewed, and more than 1,000 case possibly affected as Gobbo represented or gave legal advice to 1297 individuals with the Royal Commission putting the number at 1,011.

The actions of Findlay McRae were referred to the Victorian Legal Services Board and Commissioner and on 10 March 2022 it was reported that the actions of McRae "did not constitute unsatisfactory professional conduct or misconduct" and there would be no disciplinary action arising from the submission.

On 21 June 2023, a report by the Special Investigator Geoffrey Nettle was tabled in parliament. Nettle reported that he had made recommendations to the Director of Public Prosecutions Kerri Judd to lay criminal charges against a number of people which was refused by the DPP as there was either "little prospect of conviction" or that "the likely sentence does not justify the effort involved". Nettle recommended that the OSI "be wound up" as he considered that the chances of the DPP laying charges against anyone "were effectively nil". On 2 February 2024, the OSI was abolished.

== Commission publications ==
- McMurdo, Margaret (2019). Royal Commission into the Management of Police Informants : progress report. Royal Commission into the Management of Police Informants. Melbourne: Victorian Government Printer. ISBN 978-0-648-55920-7 – via Trove.
- McMurdo, Margaret (2020). Royal Commission into the Management of Police Informants : Final Report : Summary and Recommendations (PDF). Melbourne, Victoria: Victorian Government Printer. ISBN 978-0-648-55925-2. OCLC 1319066486.

== Scholarly publications ==
- Methven, Elyse (June 2019). "The controversial case of Lawyer X: Should lawyers be prevented from acting as human sources?". Alternative Law Journal. 44 (2): 93–99. doi:10.1177/1037969X19846273. hdl:10453/132857. ISSN 1037-969X. S2CID 151220081.
- Kyrou, Emilios (20 August 2020). A Lawyer's Duty of Confidence (PDF). Hellenic Australian Lawyers’ Association Webinar.
- Smallwood, Paul (December 2020). "Nicola Gobbo and Victoria police: The corruption of Victoria's criminal justice system". Precedent. 161: 14–17. ISSN 1449-7719.
- Bleakley, Paul (2 October 2021). "Cleansing and corridors: assessing the state (and future) of police human source management in Australia". Current Issues in Criminal Justice. 33 (4): 483–497. doi:10.1080/10345329.2021.1949795. ISSN 1034-5329. S2CID 237769606.
- Corns, Christopher (1 January 2022). "Appealing Convictions of Former Clients of Nicola Gobbo in Victoria: Some Issues and Perspectives". Criminal Law Journal. 46 (2): 77–93.
- Corns, Christopher (1 January 2022). "The Legal Regulation of Information to and from the Royal Commission into the Management of Police Informants, and the Use of Public Interest Immunity to Limit Police Disclosure of Information to Appellants in Cases Relating to the Conduct of Nicola Gobbo". Criminal Law Journal. 46 (2): 170–185.
- McCulloch, Jude; Maguire, Michael (2 January 2022). "Reforming police oversight in Victoria: lessons from Northern Ireland". Current Issues in Criminal Justice. 34 (1): 38–57. doi:10.1080/10345329.2021.1970941. ISSN 1034-5329. S2CID 239633976.
