= Kellam Review =

Victorian inquiry into actions of Nicola Gobbo

The Kellem review was an Independent Broad-based Anti-corruption Commission (IBAC) inquiry undertaken by Murray Kellam AO KC from July 2014 to February 2015 into Victoria Police human source management. The review was initiated in response to newspaper reports about the actions of lawyer Nicola Gobbo in providing information to police.

== Enquiry ==
On 14 July 2014 the Independent Broad-based Anti-corruption Commission (IBAC) appointed chief of the Tasmanian Integrity Commission and former Justice of the Supreme Court of Victoria, Murray Kellam AO KC, to undertake an enquiry, called Operation Leven, into Victoria Police human source management under section 32(5) of the IBAC Act (2011).

The review referenced Victorian Bar Rules that state "a barrister must seek to advance and protect the client's interests to the best of the barrister's skill and diligence" and noted that a breach of these rules may constitute professional misconduct as well as perverting the course of justice via denying the court access to important information. In particular Kellam noted that most information provided by a client to a barrister are either confidential or are covered by legal privilege and quoted the Covert human intelligence sources : code of practice from the United Kingdom which was released in 2002.

Where there is any doubt as to the handling and dissemination which may be subject to legal professional privilege, advice should be sought from a legal advisor before any further dissemination of the material takes place.

— Covert human intelligence sources : code of practice via Kellam Review

After examining 14 witnesses under oath including Gobbo's police handlers, and reviewing more than 5500 documents, but without inviting Gobbo to give evidence, Kellam presented a confidential report to IBAC in February 2015 which found that Gobbo was not acting in the best interests of her clients as well as a high order of negligence in the handling of human sources by Victoria Police whilst they left Gobbo to manage her legal and ethical responsibilities.

The serious systemic failure of VicPol in relation to the management of the Source (Note: now known to be Nicola Gobbo) is primarily responsible for the grave risk which has now been created for the personal safety of the Source, for the good reputation and public confidence in VicPol and to the administration of justice in Victoria.

— Kellam Review

The report identified 9 convictions that may have been affected by the actions of Gobbo and directed Victoria Police to provide a copy of the Kellam review to the Director of Public Prosecutions (DPP), John Champion, and recommended that Victoria Police and the DPP investigate the impact of Gobbo's actions on criminal convictions. In response to the report acting Chief Commissioner Tim Cartwright said that "There is no evidence at this stage of any threat to any conviction or any evidence of mistrial".

== Aftermath ==
After the completion of the Kellam Review, the DPP concluded that there was an obligation to inform some of Gobbo's former clients of her actions however Gobbo and Victoria Police launched legal action to keep the information suppressed. This legal case eventually reached the High Court of Australia and became the AB v CD case.

During legal arguments for a 2016 Herald Sun article about the appeals of Rob Karam, Victoria Police confirmed that the Kellam review concluded police used information from an informer which may have affected one or more trials, stating:

The use of information provided by a police informer or informers may have compromised the fair trial of criminals such as Rob Karam.

— Kellam Review

In 2016 it was claimed that documents had been withheld from the enquiry by Victoria Police but the complaint was dismissed and during the Royal Commission into the Management of Police Informants it was stated that IBAC had not looked into the impact of Gobbo's actions on criminal cases as part of their review.
