= Joseph Acquaro =

Melbourne lawyer, businessman

- Born: 1961 or 1962
- Died: March 15, 2016 (aged 54); Brunswick East, Victoria
- Occupations: Lawyer and Businessman
- Known for: Former president of Melbourne's Italian Chamber of Commerce and the Reggio Calabria Club

Joseph Acquaro, also known as Joe Acquaro or Pino, was a Melbourne lawyer, businessman, and former president of Melbourne's Italian Chamber of Commerce and the Reggio Calabria Club. He was shot to death on 15 March 2016 at the age of 54.

Police investigations suggested that Acquaro had been the target of a contract killing allegedly linked to figures in Melbourne’s criminal underworld. He had previously represented clients with suspected mafia associations, but later provided information to law enforcement, which may have made him a target.

== Legal work ==
Acquaro previously represented Francesco Madafferi, including helping overturn his deportation order, before severing ties in recent years.

== Incidents ==
In June 2015, 8 months before he was killed, Acquaro was warned by Victoria Police that his life was in grave danger and needed to ensure his own safety.

On 23 January 2016, about 2 months before he was killed, Acquaro's ice cream and Italian cake shop Gelobar was severely damaged in a suspicious fire which police later stated that they do not believe is related to his murder.

== Death ==
After closing his ice cream and Italian cake shop Gelobar in Brunswick East at about 12:40 in the morning of 15 March 2016 Acquaro was shot whilst walking to his car. His body was found at 3:00 that morning and was described at the time as a targeted attack. Before his murder police suspected that a $200,000 bounty, later increased to $500,000, had been placed on Acquaro's life. After Acquaro's death a suppression order related to a defamation case submitted by Antonio 'Tony' Madafferi against Nick McKenzie and Fairfax was lifted allowing information about Madafferi, Acquaro and the alleged contract to be made public. Madafferi vehemently denied the allegation of a contract on Acquaro.

On 17 March 2017 it was announced that the Homicide squad of Victoria Police would work with the Purana taskforce to investigate Acquaro's murder.

== Role as a police informer ==
Following the release of information about Nicola Gobbo's involvement with Victoria Police and the Royal Commission into the Management of Police Informants it was revealed that up to 6 other legal professionals are still acting as informants. At that time Victoria Police stated that, of these legal professionals, there was only one possible case of unethical behaviour.

It was also revealed that Acquaro, referred to as Lawyer A, had given Victoria Police information on his former client Francesco “Frank” Madafferi without being registered as a human source as Acquaro had been deemed unsuitable for registration. The convictions of Madafferi and Saverio Zirilli for a 2007 drug importation scheme is being appealed as they were represented by both Acquaro and Gobbo.

Victoria Police had attempted to keep their relationship with Acquaro secret by following their standard policy of neither confirming nor denying that he was an informer until they were ordered to release it by the Court of Appeals so that it can be used by Madafferi and Saverio Zirilli in appeals against their convictions.

In January 2021 it was revealed in court documents that Acquaro was never registered as a police informer although he was assessed to become one in 2008 and 2014 and had provided information on Madafferi which may have materially affected his trial.

== See also ==
- AB v CD (Australia)
- Nicola Gobbo
- The Honoured Society
