= Margaret McMurdo =

Australian judge

The Honourable Margaret Anne McMurdo AC FAAL
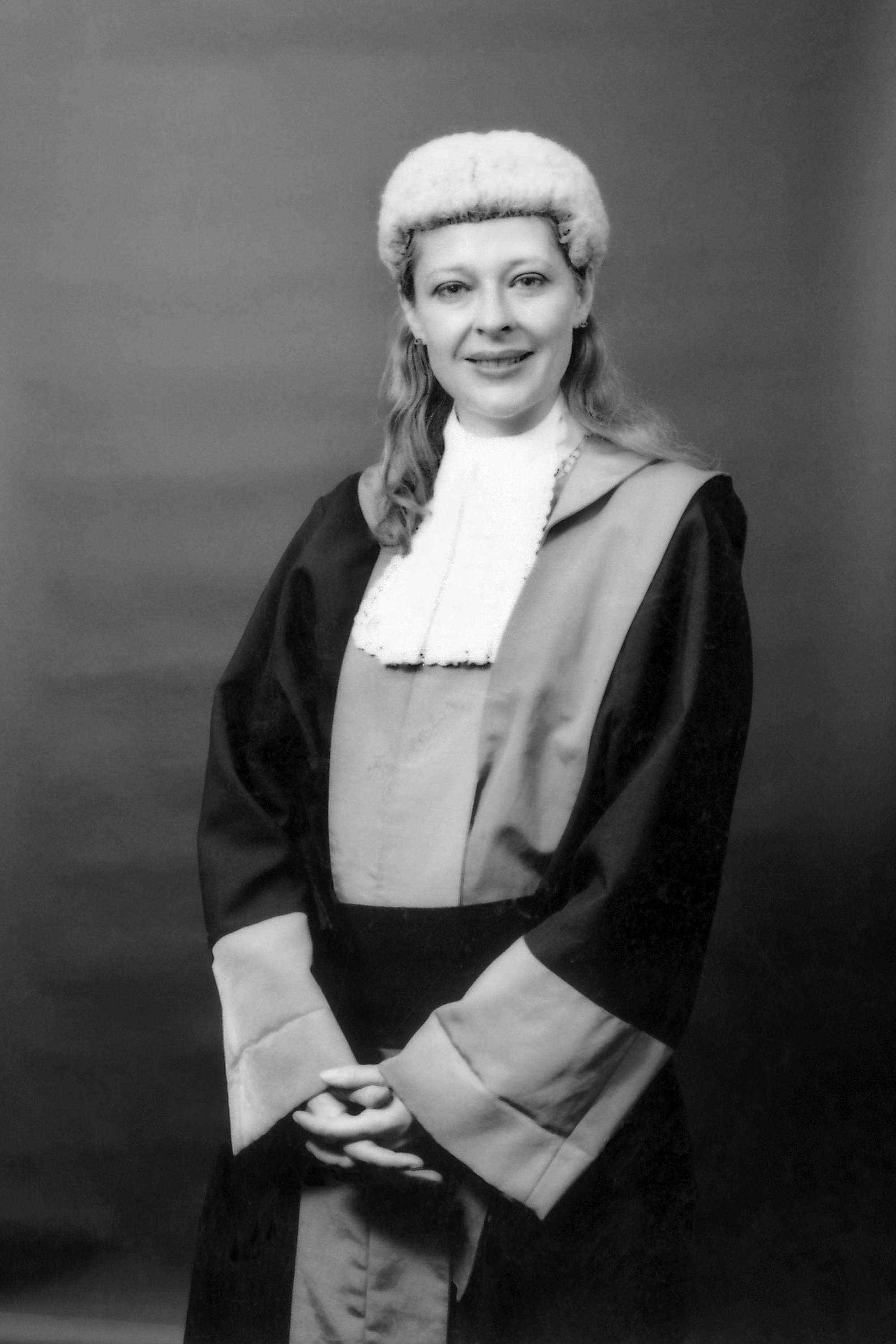

President of the Queensland Court of Appeal
- In office 30 July 1998 – 24 March 2017
- Preceded by: Tony Fitzgerald
- Succeeded by: Walter Sofronoff

Judge of the Children's Court of Queensland
- In office 1993–1998

Judge of the District Court of Queensland
- In office 29 January 1991 – 29 July 1998

Personal details
- Born: Margaret Anne Hoare; 30 August 1954 (age 71) Brisbane
- Spouse: Philip McMurdo
- Education: Brisbane Girls Grammar School; University of Queensland

Margaret Anne McMurdo AC FAAL (born 30 August 1954) is the former president of the Queensland Court of Appeal. Appointed on 30 July 1998, she was the first female president of an appellate court in Australia. She resigned effective 24 March 2017 after more than 18 years as a justice of the Court of Appeal.

== Education ==
McMurdo was educated at Brisbane Girls Grammar School (1967–1971) and then at the University of Queensland. She graduated with a Bachelor of Laws in 1975.

== Career ==
She was admitted as a barrister in 1976 and worked as a public defender from 1976 until 1989. McMurdo briefly worked as a prosecutor and a part-time member of the Criminal Justice Commission Misconduct Tribunal from 1990 until 1991. In 1991, she was the first woman to be appointed as a judge of the District Court of Queensland. She held a simultaneous commission as a judge of the Children's Court of Queensland from 1993 until 1998.

=== Queensland Court of Appeal ===
She was appointed directly as president of the Queensland Court of Appeal, without having previously been a member of the Supreme Court. She served from 30 July 1998 until she resigned in October 2016. She was the first woman appointed to lead an appellate court in Australia.

In April 2015 McMurdo was involved in a dispute with then Chief Justice of Queensland Tim Carmody, which subsequently became public, concerning disclosure of a meeting between Carmody and Hetty Johnson, the founder and executive director of the children protection advocacy group Bravehearts. After McMurdo, Carmody and Justice Hugh Fraser had heard an appeal by Brett Peter Cowan against his conviction for the murder of Daniel Morcombe and before the decision had been handed down. McMurdo sent an email to Carmody stating that:

I am deeply concerned about this. The judgements in R v Cowan are not yet delivered either in his appeal against conviction or in the Attorney-General's appeal against sentence. In the circumstances it is our respectful view that you should disclose immediately the fact of this meeting and what was discussed at it to both parties and afford them an opportunity to make submissions about it if they wish.

Carmody responded five days later was that "Any suggestion that this would be sufficient to give rise to a reasonable apprehension of bias or prejudice ... is unsupported by precedent and utterly preposterous." The response from McMurdo was to advise the Supreme and District Court executive director that she would not sit with Carmody. Carmody disclosed the meeting with Johnson and Cowan made an application that Carmody recuse himself for apprehended bias. Carmody proposed to deal with the recusal application himself, which promoted a further reaction from McMurdo and Fraser that there was a reasonable apprehension that in stating the recusal application was utterly preposterous, Carmody had prejudged the recusal application. Carmody subsequently withdrew from the case "instead of prolonging this bizarre sideshow".

=== Subsequent career ===
McMurdo was appointed Chair of the Legal Aid Board of Queensland in May 2017.

In December 2018 McMurdo was appointed as commissioner for the Royal Commission into the Management of Police Informants which was set up to examine the actions of Nicola Gobbo and Victoria Police whilst Gobbo was working as a lawyer and acting as a registered informer.

In October 2023 McMurdo was appointed to head the Inspector-General of the Australian Defence Force MRH-90 Inquiry into the fatal crash of an Australian Army MRH-90 Taipan helicopter in July 2023 while it was conducting a night-time training exercise.

== Honours ==
On 11 June 2007 McMurdo was made a Companion of the Order of Australia for "For service to the law and judicial administration in Queensland, particularly in the areas of legal education and women's issues, to the support of a range of legal organisations, and to the community."

== Personal life ==
In 1976 McMurdo married Philip McMurdo who would subsequently join her as a judge of the Supreme Court of Queensland. They have four adult children.

Legal offices
Preceded by Tony Fitzgerald	President of the Queensland Court of Appeal; 1998–2017	Succeeded by Walter Sofronoff
