= Murders of Terrence and Christine Hodson =

Double murder in Melbourne, Australia

In 2004 the murders of Terence and Christine Hodson caused the Victorian government to establish the Office of Police Integrity to investigate probable Victoria Police involvement in the murders and to investigate the leaking of sensitive police information to the Melbourne underworld.

Terence Hodson was to have been a police corruption witness and had rejected requests to enter the Witness Protection Program due to fears for his safety. A former police officer and a hitman were charged with their murders.

== Informant ==
Hodson became a police informant in 2002, after he was arrested by Drug Squad detective David Miechel. Miechel was to become Hodson's handler.

On AFL Grand Final weekend in September 2003, Hodson and off-duty Miechel were arrested for burglary on a house in Oakleigh East being used to store approximately $1.3 million in ecstasy pills by criminals and which was soon to be raided by the Drug Squad. As well as previously representing the owner of house burgled, Nicola Gobbo was due to defended Hodson on the burglary charges.

Within 48 hours, Hodson's sensitive blue file, which described the evidence he had given to the Drug Squad as an informant on criminals, was stolen from police headquarters.

Hodson agreed to give evidence for Ethical Standards detectives investigating the robbery on his accomplice detective Miechel and implicated Drug Squad detective sergeant Paul Dale. All three were charged in December 2003.

Hodson's blue file was leaked and circulated around the Melbourne underworld with Ethical Standard detectives suspecting Dale. Tony Mokbel was also suspected of faxing the document to others. Ethical Standard detectives recommended that Hodson and his family enter the Witness Protection Program due to the high risk to his safety. This was declined and they remained in their family home.

== Murder ==
Hodson and his wife were murdered in execution style on May 16, 2004, in their home in Kew, in what The Age described as "'horrific' gangland murders". Their hands were tied behind their backs and had suffered gunshot wounds to the back of their heads in their lounge room. Christine Hodson is believed to have had no involvement in crime and according to Gangland Rules this 'Broke the Code' as you never touch the partners. The bodies were found by two of their children, Mandy Hodson and Andrew Hodson.

The charges against Dale for the robbery were dropped after Hodson's murder. The murders sparked calls for a Royal Commission into Victoria Police with the government establishing the Office of Police Integrity (OPI). The murder was investigated by Charlie Bezzina and the Homicide Squad despite the Ethical Standards detectives requesting a dedicated task force. The Petra Task Force was created in 2007 to investigate and the OPI in Operation Oboe investigated serving police officers associated with Dale for interfering with the murder investigation. Gavan Ryan from the Purana Taskforce was also involved in the investigation.

In 2008, authorities offered a $1 million reward for information leading to the solution of the crime. Miechel was jailed in August 2006 for 12 years for the drugs burglary.

== Trial ==
In 2009, Dale was charged with murder of Terrence Hodson and underworld hitman Rodney Charles Collins charged with the double murder. After a significant crown witness in the case Carl Williams was beaten to death in prison in April 2010, the charges against both men were dropped.

The prosecution was to allege that Dale paid Williams to arrange the murder of Terrence Hodson and that Williams gave the contract of $150,000 to Rodney Collins. Prominent Melbourne criminal barrister Nicola Gobbo, once a person of interest herself, who had worn a wire to record conversations with Dale at the request of detectives, was to give evidence including that she acted as a courier for Dale. The hitman, who had killed the wife who was not part of contract, was charged with the double murder.

Dale remains a person of interest in the case. In 2010, the Petra Task Force was disbanded.

During the Royal Commission into the Management of Police Informants, detectives involved with the investigation said that investigations into the murders were hampered by the desire to protect Gobbo's status as an informer. In 2020 Gobbo stated that she believes that she now knows who is responsible for the murders.

== In popular culture ==
The Hodsons’ murders was dramatised in television series Fat Tony & Co and Informer 3838.

The case was covered in detail in June 2020 by journalist Andrew Rule in his Australian crime podcast Life & Crimes. In the 4-part series, he interviewed two of their children, Mandy Hodson and Andrew Hodson.

== See also ==
- Shirley Finn
- Sallie-Anne Huckstep
