= Zarah Garde-Wilson =

Australian criminal defense lawyer

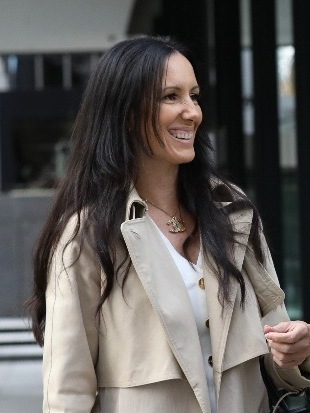
- Zarah Garde-Wilson at Melbourne County Court in 2024
- Born: 1977 or 1978 (age 48–49); Armidale, New South Wales, Australia
- Education: University of Western Australia
- Occupation: Lawyer
- Known for: Criminal Law
- Website: gardewilson.com.au

Zarah Garde-Wilson (born c. 1978) is an Australian criminal defence lawyer and principal partner at Garde Wilson Lawyers. She is known for her role in the Melbourne gangland wars and the subsequent Lawyer X scandal. Throughout her career, she has represented a number of high-profile figures, including Carl Williams, Tony Mokbel, and Fadi Haddara.

Garde-Wilson's legal career became linked with Melbourne's underworld following the murder of her then boyfriend, convicted killer Lewis Caine, in 2004. She was convicted of contempt of court in 2005, after she refused to testify in Caine's murder trial. Her experiences during the Melbourne gangland wars led to her involvement in matters concerning barrister Nicola Gobbo's role as a police informant, known as Lawyer X scandal, and later gave testimony at the subsequent Royal Commission into the Management of Police Informants, which scrutinized the conduct of Victoria Police.

Following the Lawyer X scandal, Garde-Wilson has represented clients who appealed against their convictions in matters linked to the scandal, as well as continuing her criticism of corruption within the Australian criminal justice system and her advocacy for defendants' rights. She has also been involved in defamation proceedings against Google and far-right activist Avi Yemini. Her role in Melbourne's gangland wars was dramatised in the television series Underbelly and Fat Tony & Co.

== Early life and education ==
Garde-Wilson received her secondary education at Fairholme College, in Toowoomba, Queensland. She later moved to Perth, Western Australia, to study law at the University of Western Australia.

== Career ==
Upon finishing university, Garde-Wilson worked as a law clerk for the law firm Pryles & Defteros. After working for Pryles & Defteros, she went into independent practice as principle at Garde Wilson Lawyers.

=== Melbourne gangland killings ===
Garde-Wilson came into the public eye during the Melbourne gangland killings as a legal representative for several persons investigated by the Victoria Police from 1998 to 2006 in relation to the killings, specifically the high-profile trials of Carl Williams and Tony Mokbel. Garde-Wilson was the girlfriend of convicted murderer Lewis Caine, who was murdered in the gangland killings. In 2005, Garde-Wilson was found guilty of contempt of court after refusing to testify against the two men charged with the murder of her boyfriend Lewis Caine, saying that she feared for her life.

In the course of her involvement, she represented several high-profile clients who were unknowingly compromised by their own attorney, Nicola Gobbo, who was secretly acting as a police informant under the codename "Informer 3838" (also known as Lawyer X). Garde-Wilson's concerns about leaks within the legal system and her public questioning of the legal integrity of Victoria Police began to intensify during the late 2000s. However, her calls for broader public and legal scrutiny that eventually exposed Nicola Gobbo's role as "Informer 3838" escalated significantly around 2018 when the media first publicly disclosed Gobbo's role as an informant.

Following the revelations surrounding Nicola Gobbo's dual role as a lawyer and a police informant, the Royal Commission into the Management of Police Informants was established. Garde-Wilson provided testimony during this inquiry, which scrutinized the conduct of Victoria Police and the implications of using a legal professional as an informant. In response to the Commission's findings and the subsequent impact on public trust in the justice system, Garde-Wilson, along with other prominent Australian lawyers, called for significant reforms. In July 2023, following the closure of the Lawyer X Office of the Special Investigator, these legal practitioners, including Garde-Wilson, demanded an official apology from former Victorian Premier Daniel Andrews, emphasizing the need for reforms to restore integrity within the judicial system.

The ABC News report published in December 2025 found that the Victorian Police had been collecting and reviewing evidence collected as part of a secret bugging program in Victoria's high-security prisons, Garde-Wilson likened it to the Lawyer X scandal, stating it was improbable anyone would be held professionally accountable.

=== Other notable cases ===
In 2016, Garde-Wilson filed an appeal for the first Lawyer X case concerning convicted trafficker Rob Karam, who was involved in Australia's largest MDMA importation known as the "Tomato Tins" case. Convicted in 2012, Karam was implicated in smuggling 4.4 tonnes of ecstasy pills, valued at $122 million, hidden in tomato tins – a scheme purportedly orchestrated by the Calabrian Mafia. This case drew significant media attention due to the scale of the drug importation and the controversial involvement of Nicola Gobbo who also provided information to police about Karam.

In 2019, Garde-Wilson represented Athar Almatrah in a case involving an alleged setup to ambush Rocco Curra, a member of the Mongols motorcycle gang, using a fake Instagram account. During the proceedings, Garde-Wilson disputed the evidence against Almatrah, challenging the claims about her client's intent and the credibility of the testimony from co-accused individuals. Garde-Wilson represented Osman El-Houli in the trial held by the Supreme Court of Queensland in 2022, where he was accused of driving from Melbourne to Queensland to collect 400kg cocaine, but the jury found him not guilty after deliberating for four hours and he was acquitted of all charges.

In 2022, Garde-Wilson acted as the defence attorney for Tony Larussa before the Court of Appeal in Western Australia. Larussa, initially sentenced over involvement in a methamphetamine operation, successfully appealed the conviction and was acquitted of all charges. In 2024, Garde-Wilson represented reputed Melbourne underworld boss Fadi Haddara who faced legal proceedings regarding firearms charges. The charges included possession of unregistered firearms and handling a stolen Glock handgun. In 2025 proceedings before the Victorian Magistrates' Court, all firearms-related charges against Fadi Haddara were withdrawn following an assessment of the available evidence. The court then ordered costs against the prosecution amounting to $20,000.

== Civil litigation ==
In 2020, Garde-Wilson initiated legal action against Google, aiming to learn the identity of an anonymous online reviewer she suspected as a rival trying to damage her reputation. In the case, Justice Bernard Murphy had ordered Google, which did not object to the application, to provide reviewer's account registration information along with IP addresses, however it was not enough to identify who was behind the posts. Garde-Wilson tried to get more information including phone numbers and email addresses that were used to verify the account when it was created or recover account when it was lost. Google claimed that due to the length of time since the account was deleted, any relevant data associated with the reviewer had been "permanently deleted". Garde-Wilson said in a statement to The Age newspaper that she would issue proceedings against Google for destroying the account data and failing to save the reviewer's information in a "timely way".

In June 2021, Garde-Wilson initiated a defamation lawsuit against Avi Yemini, a far-right provocateur associated with the Canadian-based far-right website Rebel News. The case was filed in the Federal Court of Australia under the title "ZARAH GARDE-WILSON v AVI YEMINI & ANOR". The proceedings concluded with a settlement in October 2021, although the specific terms of the settlement were not made public.

== In popular culture ==
In 2008, Garde-Wilson was portrayed by Kestie Morassi in the true-crime drama series Underbelly. Later, in 2014, Zoe Cramond played her in Fat Tony & Co.

== Personal life ==
Garde-Wilson was romantically involved with Lewis Caine, a notable figure in Melbourne's underworld, who was murdered on 8 May 2004. Caine, also known by the aliases Sean Vincent and Adrian Bligh, had extensive connections within the Melbourne criminal milieu, which were often highlighted in media reports about his life and death. Zarah Garde-Wilson is a mother to three children. She gave birth to her daughter Samantha in late 2008, and twins Max and Sophie in September 2010.
