= Armed Offenders Squad (Victoria) =

- Active: 1999–2006
- Country: Australia
- Agency: Victoria Police
- Type: Detective unit
- Role: Investigating non-fatal violent crimes, armed robberies, and tactical responses
- Operations jurisdiction: Victoria
- Base station: St Kilda Road Police Station
- Common name: AOS
- Abbreviation: AOS

Structure
- Detectives: 35

Commanders
- Notable commanders: Detective Inspector Bernie Rankin

Notables
- Significant operation(s): Operation Air (OPI investigation)

The Armed Offenders Squad was a unit of Victoria Police in Australia tasked with investigating non-fatal violent crimes. Subject to frequent complaints of police brutality, the squad was disbanded in 2006 following an investigation by the Victorian Office of Police Integrity.

== Formation ==
The predecessor of the Armed Offenders Squad was the Armed Robbery Squad, a unit regularly accused of excessive force and violence. The 1979 Beach Inquiry found that the Armed Robbery Squad had committed "abuses... so grave as to warrant the most prompt institution of safeguarding reforms.". In 1999 the Armed Robbery Squad, the Special Response Squad, and the Prison Squad were amalgamated to form the Armed Offenders Squad. At the time of its dissolution in 2006, the Squad was made up of 35 detectives.

== Internal culture ==
The Armed Offenders Squad had their self-created logo of two golden revolvers with the barrels crossed. When the Squad would submit printed evidence to the Victorian Prosecutor, they superimposed the golden-revolver logo on top of the official Victoria Police badge symbol in contravention of Victorian Police regulations. All Squad members, including the squad's sole female member, adopted a uniform of black suits, white shirts, dark sunglasses and a team-issue black tie featuring the logo. The uniform was based on the clothes worn by the jewel-thieves in the film Reservoir Dogs.

Understaffing meant that the Armed Offenders Squad rarely had a permanent supervisor, operating instead under a succession of acting managers and short-term appointees. The Office of Police Integrity's investigation found that "informal Squad culture ... gained such strength and impenetrability that the chain of command was effectively reversed, to the point where some Squad members considered themselves immune from managerial accountability or authority." When, in 2003, a newly appointed Inspector drew up a comprehensive and detailed action plan to improve the day-to-day operations of the squad, his proposals were ignored until he was transferred out, at which point they were permanently shelved. When interviewed by the Office of Police Integrity, a former Squad manager said: "I’d rather see someone out getting complaints for working... You’re going to accumulate complaints if you work... sure you won’t get any if you just sit around and do nothing."

The Office of Police Integrity found that the Armed Offenders Squad were "contemptuous of the law", "divisive, insular, and exclusionary", and possessed an attitude of "elitist superiority within Victoria Police". Covert surveillance revealed that some members still identified with the disbanded Armed Robbery Squad, with Detective Mark Butterfield saying to a suspect "Welcome to the Armed Robbery Squad" before assaulting him.

Armed Offenders Squad detective Graeme Head crashed his car in Mentone in 2001 after a night of drinking with Squad colleagues. When police arrived and attempted to give him a breathalyser test, Head fled the scene twice and was finally captured with the aid of police dogs. Tests revealed that his blood alcohol level was more than three times the legal limit. When Head was found guilty of drink driving offences two years after the crash, Assistant Commissioner Simon Overland said "a lot has changed in two years" and that the Squad had been reformed since Head's crash.

In October 2005, Detective Inspector Bernie Rankin was appointed to head the Squad. Rankin, former head of the homicide squad and investigator of the Russell Street Bombing, was specifically tasked with reducing the number of complaints the squad was generating. On his appointment, Rankin held a meeting with the Squad members, telling them that their performance had to improve, and that the Inspector had to be notified when prisoners arrived for interrogation. He also warned them that video equipment would be installed in the interview rooms, although this was not arranged for more than two years. Briefings were moved from the informal setting of the Squad kitchen to a new operations room, and new administrative procedures were introduced to make sure that management was informed of the activities of the officers. After this period, there were fewer complaints made against the squad.

== Investigation ==
In July 2005, George Brouwer, the OPI's director, received a letter from a man claiming he had been punched, kicked, elbowed, thrown down a flight of stairs, choked unconscious, and strangled with a plastic bag over his head by three detectives from the Armed Offenders Squad. Later that year the OPI began an investigation into the Squad, codenamed "Operation Air". An initial statistical analysis of complaints indicated an unusually high rate of allegations of violence against the AOS compared to similar squads. Investigators placed covert electronic surveillance equipment in the Armed Offenders Squad's interrogation room at the St Kilda Road Police Station.

== Beating of suspect A100 ==
The resulting secret footage revealed one suspect being told, prior to the commencement of a formal interview, that he was not allowed to request a lawyer and that if he did so, the formal audiotape of the interview would be erased and the interview would start afresh. The suspect was codenamed A100 and has been interrogated about the whereabouts of a shotgun used in robberies. A100 was held for six hours, during which he was not given anything to drink or allowed to use the toilet. During the interrogation, he was dragged from his chair, assaulted by two officers, and punched and kicked until bloody while the officers yelled, between punches, "Fucking... Armed... Robbery... Squad". After the first assault on the suspect had already happened, Inspector Rankin entered the room for a supposed "welfare check". Rankin told the suspect: "It’s going to be a long hard day for you, pal. ... I suggest you listen to some of the advice that the boys are going to give you. It might be a lot less painful."

The six-hour detention yielded only fourteen minutes of formally taped interview. Detective Mark Butterfield was secretly taped punching the suspect in his ear, which began to bleed, and threatening that the ear would "come off" by the end of the interrogation. Towards the conclusion of the interview, the suspect asked whether he could make a telephone call, for which he was beaten with a telephone by Detective Robert Dabb who said: "Here it is, here's your fucking phone call... piece of shit."

== Dissolution and aftermath ==
In June 2006, the Squad's offices were raided by the OPI. At the time of the investigation, the powerful police union, the Police Association, was headed by Paul Mullett, a former Armed Robbery Squad detective. After the raid, he called for the OPI to be disbanded, calling the investigation a "disgrace".

On 13 September 2006, Chief Commissioner Christine Nixon called a meeting with the Squad's members to announce that the unit was being disbanded. The meeting was covertly recorded and its content leaked to the Herald Sun. The leaker also supplied the Herald Sun with a poem written by a Squad detective, "Ode to the Armed Offenders Squad", which ran in part:

They’ve done a good job, the bosses will say, but know that will last but for a day.
Because some have complained a door was broken, a dog was kicked and neighbours awoken.
But the crim is in the A.O.S. say, the bosses are angry; two complainants today.
So long as there’s bad crooks, they’ll need us around, if they’re rid of us then crime will abound.

Six days later, at a public hearing, Squad detectives Robert Lachlan Dabb, Mark Harrison Butterfield and Matthew Adrian Franc were shown videotape of themselves beating A100. Dabb collapsed in the witness stand when the video was shown. All three claimed not to recognise themselves on the video and denied any involvement in the beating. They were suspended the next day. In response, the Police Association led a rally in Batman Park, which was attended by about 300 police and former members of the Squad, including Dabb, Butterfield, and Franc. The gathering passed resolutions calling for the Squad to be reinstated, for Christine Nixon to resign, and for the OPI to be disbanded. Police Association secretary Paul Mullett told the rally that disbanding the squad would lead to "what's currently occurring in NSW: drive-by shootings, ethnic gangs, race gangs, youth gangs, street gangs, gang rapes by the day". Eventually, Victoria Police guaranteed that the Squad members who were not charged would be guaranteed jobs in the Squad's replacement, the Armed Crime Task Force.

In May 2007, Detective Inspector Bernie Rankin was charged with counselling or procuring the commission of an assault. Dabb, Butterfield and Franc were charged with unlawful assault and lying to the OPI. The charges against Rankin were later dropped. Dabb, Butterfield, and Franc initially seemed likely to fight the charges but later pleaded guilty to assaulting the suspect. Dabb and Butterfield received sentences of ten weeks of community service. Franc was sentenced to five weeks.

With the criminal proceedings finalised, the OPI published its report on the Armed Offenders Squad in October 2008. The report found that replacing the Armed Offenders Squad with an Armed Crime Task Force had increased the percentage of crimes solved from 47% to 80%, and reduced the average number of annual complaints from 10 to less than 1. The report also recommended that video cameras be placed in all Victoria Police vehicles, due to numerous allegations of assaults taking place while suspects were being transported, and that suspects be videotaped from the moment of their arrival at the police station. It was concluded that the Squad was a "cultural relic" and that its members had "[drawn] comfort from the strong support they received from the Police Association". Police Association secretary Paul Mullett would later step down after being charged with perjury and attempting to pervert the course of justice following an unrelated OPI investigation.
