= Integrity Commission (Tasmania) =

Anti-corruption commission in Tasmania

Commission overview
- Formed: 1 October 2010; 16 years ago
- Jurisdiction: Tasmania
- Headquarters: Surrey House, Level 2, 199 Macquarie St, Hobart, Tasmania
- Employees: 15.5 (2020–2021); 14.2 (2017–2018)
- Annual budget: $2.7 million (2020–2021); $2.46 million (2017–2018)
- Commission executive: Greg Melick, Chief Commissioner
- Key document: Integrity Commission Act 2009 (Tas)
- Website: www.integrity.tas.gov.au

The Integrity Commission is a Tasmanian integrity agency established in 2010 to deal with complaints about public sector misconduct.

== History ==
In 2009 the Bartlett Labor government passed the "Integrity Commission Act 2009 (Tas)" which established Tasmania's Integrity Commission, with a commencement date of 1 October 2010.

Murray Kellam was chief of the Commission from 2010 to 2015. When he stepped down, Kellam was critical of the Tasmanian Government for failing to create the offence of misconduct in public office.

Kellam was replaced as chief by Greg Melick in August 2015.

The commission reported receiving 126 complaints in their 2016–17 annual report and 193 complaints in their 2017–18 report.

== Reviews ==
In 2015 the Joint Standing Committee on Integrity of the Tasmanian Parliament completed a review of the Commission.

Pursuant to section 107 of the legislation covering the Commission, a 5 year review of the operation of the Commission is required. William Cox, Governor of Tasmania from 2004–2008 and former Chief Justice of the Supreme Court of Tasmania was appointed to conduct the review in November 2015 and it was presented in May 2016. This review made 55 recommendations of which 49 remained unimplemented in March 2022.

== Criticism ==
Responding to the Kellam's comments when he left the commission in 2015, Lara Giddings, the shadow attorney-general noted that their budget had been cut by 20% in the previous year which they saw as showing a lack of support for the Integrity Commission.

In 2018 leader of the Tasmanian Greens, Cassy O'Connor, was critical of the practice of referring complaints back to the relevant department, saying:

The fact that our integrity body, the Integrity Commission, is having to refer complaints back to the department that the complaint is made about will send a shudder down the spine of public servants who want to blow the whistle about potential bad practices or misconduct within their department.

— Cassy O'Connor

In 2019 Geoffrey Watson SC, former council assisting the Independent Commission Against Corruption (ICAC) in New South Wales, argued that it was "disturbing" that the Integrity Commission has never conducted public hearings and criticised the failure to make commission reports public. Watson was also critical of the requirement for complaints to be made in writing, in contrast to other Australian jurisdictions.

In March 2022 The Australia Institute published a report critical of the Commission finding that it ranked poorly in a number of areas and is one of the weakest anti-corruption bodies in Australia. The author of the report argued that public hearings are needed to demonstrate that justice is being done and noted that there had been no public hearings since the founding of the Commission. They also noted that there had been references to the Integrity Commission during the last 2 election campaigns that were unable to be investigated as rules prevent the investigation of elected members once an election campaign is underway.

Kristie Johnston, independent member for the seat of the Division of Clark, said that there is "snowball's chance in hell that this government will move to reform and strengthen the Integrity Commission in Tasmania" and Cassy O'Connor said "It has been in the Gutwein Government's interest to keep the Integrity Commission enfeebled, to make sure that it doesn't bare its teeth"
