= Philip McMurdo =

Australian judge (born 1954)

Philip D. McMurdo (born 19 May 1954) is an Australian judge. He has been a judge of the Queensland Court of Appeal since 2015; he was previously a judge of the Supreme Court of Queensland from 2003 to 2015.

He was born in Brisbane, and studied law at the University of Queensland. He was admitted as a solicitor in 1977 and admitted to the Queensland Bar in 1980. He was a part-time member of the Queensland Law Reform Commission from 1995 to 2001. His wife, Margaret McMurdo, has also served on the court.

He had been long-tipped for a Court of Appeal appointment before his promotion; in 2014, all judges apart from his wife nominated McMurdo as the most suitable choice for a vacancy, in advice that was ignored by then-Attorney-General Jarrod Bleijie. In the same year, he called for changes to judicial appointment processes following the controversy over the appointment of former Chief Justice Tim Carmody.
