= Informer 3838 =

2020 Australian TV series

- Genre: Crime; Drama
- Directed by: Ben Lucas; Geoff Bennett
- Country of origin: Australia
- Original language: English
- No. of episodes: 2

Production
- Executive producer: Rory Callaghan
- Producers: Kerrie Mainwaring; Anna Molyneaux
- Production location: Melbourne
- Production company: Screentime

Original release
- Network: Nine Network
- Release: 20 April – 27 April 2020

Informer 3838 is an Australian television series focusing on criminal barrister-turned police informer Nicola Gobbo (codenamed informer 3838) and her involvement in the Melbourne gangland killings. It is a spin-off of the Underbelly franchise, with various actors reprising their role from previous series. Commissioned by the Nine Network and produced by Screentime, it was broadcast between 20 and 27 April 2020.

== Cast ==
The cast for the series including returning names such as Gyton Grantley, Robert Mammone and Hollie Andrew.:

- Ella Scott Lynch as Nicola Gobbo
- Gyton Grantley as Carl Williams
- Hollie Andrew as Roberta Williams
- Robert Mammone as Tony Mokbel
- Rhys Muldoon as Terrence Hodson
- Jacquie Brennan as Christine Hodson
- Ian Bliss as Simon Overland
- Tim Ross as Gary Berich
- Stephen Peacocke as Paul Dale
- Richard Davies as Kevin 'Juicy' Jucirovic
- Olympia Valance as Emma Darlington
- Jane Harber as Susan Reichert
- Salvatore Coco as Steve Moore
- Luke Lennox as Prison Inmate
- Kaden Hartcher as Matthew Johnson
- Kevin Hofbauer as David Miechel
- Robert Rabiah as P.K.
- Laura Wheelwright as Nikki Hodson

== Plot ==
=== Part 1 ===
Opening during her days studying law at the University of Melbourne, Nicola Gobbo is arrested by police who raided her house and discovered drugs seemingly belonging to her housemate. Under pressure from police, she agrees to provide evidence against her housemate and avoids conviction as a result. Moving forward a few years, the Melbourne gangland killings were in full flight and Gobbo was building a strong reputation as a criminal lawyer.

Her early clients include Tony Mokbel and Carl Williams as well as their associates. On top of her legal successes, Gobbo parties, socialises and becomes involved with her clients and their friends. Around this time Terence Hodson, a person heavily involved in the drug trade, faces a dilemma when his children are arrested and facing prison. He becomes an informant and develops a relationship with detectives within the drug squad, including Paul Dale and David Miechel. A while later, David Miechel (an off duty drug squad detective) and Terence Hodson rob a drug house in Oakleigh containing large amounts of drugs and cash after it is staked out by Paul Dale. They are arrested while fleeing the scene of the robbery and Hodson subsequently agrees to give evidence against Miechel and Paul Dale, the latter of which is subsequently arrested and jailed. During this time, Gobbo speaks to Dale on several occasions, both during and after his incarceration, though is not engaged fully as his attorney at this time. They hold a somewhat friendly, but mutually cautious relationship with each other.

Shortly after, Terence Hodson's informant file is taken from the police station and distributed throughout the criminal underworld. Gobbo becomes aware of this and warns Hodson as well as speaking to the Ethical Standards department in an attempt to have them provide protection, but they state that Hodson has actively rejected all offers of any form of witness protection. Fearful, though remaining at home, Hodson and his wife are visited by their old friend Rodney Charles Collins, who indicates he is there for a friendly visit and manages to convince Hodson to let him in. Once inside, he forces Terence and his wife into their living room at gun point and executes both of them. The episode concludes with Gobbo at the Hodson's house, providing support for his devastated children.

=== Part 2 ===
Reeling from learning about the Hodson's murders and being so devastated that she got so close to them Nicola goes to Reichert and tells her that she can give her and the police Carl Williams as Carl was leading the gangland wars "he was the war", during this time Nicola speaks with Mr L and tries to get him to give up Mokbel and Williams as he refuses to help them, he finally does, but during this time Nicola is asked to turn Informer by Reichert which sets off a chain of events, including Mr L giving evidence to the cops which leads to Carl's arrest and Nicola's stroke.

While recovering Mokbel gives Nicola a client to defend but the client Kipiani is sent to jail which makes Mokbel happy. But as the situation deteriorates even more Nicole meets up with Commissioner Simon Overland who tells Nicola she must meet with Paul Dale to see if he knows anything about the murders.

When Dale denies that he had anything to do with the murders, all blame is placed on Williams' hitman Rodney.

Overland furious that the Hodson murders would be an unsolved Cold Case, he tells his team to instead focus on destroying Mokbel's drug empire.

Later on Carl is killed in prison by an inmate and the Hodson murder case falls apart and Dale is free to go on with his life, the commissioner and the police force comes to terms with Nicola's deal for recompense and agree to it, leaving Berich to tell Reichert if Nicola's informing came out crims would be screaming for release due to tainted evidence.

The episode ends with a show of Carl's death, Mokbel appealing his 30-year sentence, Paul Dale never being charged, the Hodson's murders never being solved and Nicola's whereabouts unknown at the time.

== Controversy ==
During an amendment made on the DVD version of Informer 3838 Simon Overland made a complaint to Channel 9 over his portrayal in the mini series, the end on the DVD includes the removal of the Hodson Murders, and Overland's information placed saying he had not had any contact with Gobbo during the Gangland War.

== Ratings ==
No.	Title	Air date	Timeslot	Overnight ratings		Consolidated ratings		Total viewers	Ref(s)
No.	Title	Air date	Timeslot	Viewers	Rank	Viewers	Rank	Total viewers	Ref(s)
1	Part 1	20 April 2020	Monday 8:45pm	644,000	16	128,000	12	772,000	
2	Part 2	27 April 2020	Monday 8:45pm	574,000	17	188,000	12	762,000	

== See also ==
- Royal Commission into the Management of Police Informants
