= Murray Kellam =

Australian judge

The Honourable Murray Kellam AO KC

Judge of the Supreme Court of Victoria
- In office 28 January 1998 – 15 June 2009

Personal details
- Born: Murray Byron Kellam Melbourne, Victoria, Australia
- Education: Carey Baptist Grammar School
- Alma mater: Monash University; University of Melbourne
- Occupation: Barrister; judge

Murray Byron Kellam AO KC was formerly a judge of the County Court of Victoria in Australia before being appointed as a judge on 28 January 1998 to the Supreme Court of Victoria, the highest ranking court in the Australian State of Victoria. He was also the first President of VCAT. On 16 May 2007 Kellam was appointed a judge of Appeal. He retired from the Supreme Court on 15 June 2009. Kellam also served as a member of the Supreme Court of Samoa. He was appointed an Acting Judge of the Supreme Court of the ACT on 8 March 2017.

In 2005, Kellam was made an Officer of the Order of Australia (AO) for his contributions to the law, and for his support of disadvantaged people in Thailand and Melbourne.

Kellam was appointed as chief of the Tasmanian Integrity Commission from 2010 to 2015. When he stepped down, Kellam was critical of the Tasmanian Government for failing to create the offence of misconduct in public office.

In July 2014 Kellam was appointed by the Independent Broad-based Anti-corruption Commission (IBAC) to conduct the Kellam Review into Victoria Police human source management relating to the role of Nicola Gobbo.

Kellam first studied at Carey Baptist Grammar School, where he was later honoured by the school with the ‘Carey Medal’ in 2008. He holds a Bachelor of Laws and a Bachelor of Jurisprudence from Monash University. He also holds a Master of Laws (LLM) from Melbourne University.

== See also ==
- Judiciary of Australia
- List of Judges of the Supreme Court of Victoria
- Victorian Bar Association
- National Alternative Dispute Resolution Advisory Committee
