= Greg Melick =

Australian army officer

- Military career
- Allegiance: Australia
- Branch: Australian Army Reserve
- Service years: 1966–2018
- Rank: Major General
- Unit: Royal Australian Infantry Corps
- Commands: Head of Cadet, Reserve and Employer Support Division; 8th Brigade; 12th/40th Battalion, Royal Tasmania Regiment
- Awards: Officer of the Order of Australia; Knight of the Order of St John; Reserve Force Decoration; Officer of the National Order of Merit (France)
- Other work: Colonel Commandant of 1st Commando Regiment

Major General Aziz Gregory Melick, AO, RFD was a senior officer in the Australian Army.

== Military career ==
As part of the 2005 Queen's Birthday Honours, Melick was appointed a Member of the Order of Australia (AM) for "exceptional service as Commanding Officer of 12th/40th Royal Tasmania Regiment and as Commander 8th Brigade.", and later that same year on 17 November 2005, he was appointed a Member of the Order of St John.

In 2011, as part of the Australia Day Honours, Melick was advanced as an Officer of the Order of Australia (AO) for "distinguished service as Commander 8th Brigade, Head of Reserve and Employer Support Division, and as Head of Cadet, Reserve and Employer Support Division, Australian Defence Force.", later in the same year he was advanced as a Commander of the Order of St John on 11 November 2011. In 2018, he was again advanced, as a Knight of the Order of St John.

On 25 April 2025, Melick was appointed an Officer of the National Order of Merit by the French President Emmanuel Macron, with the honour being presented by French ambassador to Australia Pierre-André Imbert.

Non-profit organization positions
Preceded by Warrant Officer Robert Dick	National President of the Returned and Services League of Australia; 2019–2025	Incumbent
