= Robert Redlich =

Judge of the Supreme Court of Victoria

The Honourable Robert Redlich AM, KC

Commissioner of the Victorian Independent Broad-based Anti-corruption Commission
- Incumbent
- Assumed office 1 January 2018

Judge of the Supreme Court of Victoria
- In office 11 November 2002 – 3 March 2016

Personal details
- Born: 3 March 1946 (age 80)

Robert Frank Redlich AM, KC (born 3 March 1946) was the commissioner of the Victorian Independent Broad-based Anti-corruption Commission (IBAC) (2018-2022) and is a former judge of the Supreme Court of Victoria's Court of Appeal.

Justice Redlich was appointed to the trial division of the Supreme Court in 2002 and was elevated to the Court of Appeal in 2006.

On 1 January 2018, Justice Redlich commenced a five-year term as Commissioner of the Independent Broad-based Anti-corruption Commission.

In 2026 he became Chair of the Accountability Round Table
