= Chris Maxwell (jurist) =

Australian judge

Christopher Murray Maxwell AC is an Australian jurist. He succeeded Justice John Winneke as President of the Victorian Court of Appeal on 16 July 2005. He retired as President of the Court of Appeal on 15 July 2022, after serving in the role for 17 years.

== Career ==
Maxwell was educated at Melbourne Grammar School and the University of Melbourne where he was resident at Trinity College. He played rugby and Australian rules football at Trinity, where he was the senior student in 1973. After graduating with honours in 1974, he was selected as Victorian Rhodes Scholar for 1975, completing a Bachelor of Philosophy at Oxford University. In 1978, he became a barrister at Lincoln's Inn in London practising briefly at the English Bar. In 1979, he returned to Melbourne working as a solicitor at law firm Phillips Fox. In 1981, he became principal private secretary to ALP Senator Gareth Evans who was appointed as federal Attorney-General in 1983. In 1983, he left to become a barrister in Victoria and was variously reader for Kenneth Hayne QC and reader for Ross Robson QC. He signed the Victorian Bar Roll in 1984 and became a QC in 1998.

Maxwell was a Victorian Legal Aid Commissioner for seven years from 1986 and also a member of the board of Liberty Victoria for six years, two of them as president from 2000. He appeared with Julian Burnside QC in the Tampa refugee case, and was then famously but unsuccessfully countersued (as a board member of Liberty Victoria) by the Commonwealth of Australia for costs. In 1982 he published An Introduction to the Securities Industry Codes (Sydney: Butterworths, 1982) with Robert Baxt and Selwyn Bajada, released in a second edition in 1988 as Stock Markets and the Securities industry: Law and Practice (Sydney: Butterworths, 1988). In 2002, he was later commissioned by the Victorian government to review the Occupational Health and Safety Act 1985.

In 2019, Maxwell heard the high profile County Court appeal of Cardinal George Pell against his conviction for the commission of sexual offences. Maxwell concurred with the Court of Appeal 2-1 majority rejecting the appeal, which was subsequently overruled by the High Court.

During an appeal into a drug importation conviction by Tony Mokbel due to the actions of Nicola Gobbo in providing information to Victoria Police, Maxwell called the actions of Gobbo and others involved in her informing "disgraceful" and a "matter of profound importance".

Maxwell is an adjunct professor at Victoria University. He is married with three children. His wife Sarah is a daughter of Sir Ninian Stephen who was a Governor-General of Australia and High Court Justice.
