= Nicola Gobbo =

Australian lawyer and police informer

- Born: 16 November 1972 (age 53); Melbourne, Australia
- Other names: Nikki Gobbo, Lawyer X, Informer 3838
- Education: University of Melbourne
- Occupation: Former criminal barrister (struck off the Roll of Legal Practitioners)
- Partner: Richard Barkho
- Relatives: Sir James Gobbo (uncle)

Nicola Maree Gobbo, sometimes known as Nikki Gobbo, (born 16 November 1972) is an Australian former criminal defence barrister and police informant.

== Drug charge at law school ==
In 1993, while she was a law student, police raided a house owned by Gobbo and found amphetamines, marijuana, and weapons. Gobbo, her boyfriend, the drug dealer Brian Wilson, and another man were charged with drug possession and pleaded guilty. Gobbo was given a good behaviour bond. Two years later, another raid turned up more amphetamines. Gobbo was concerned that another drug conviction would destroy her law career. No charges were laid, and soon afterwards, she was registered as police informer G395 although she claimed to be unaware of the fact until finding it out through the media.

== 1996 election scandal ==
Gobbo first came to public attention during the 1996 Australian federal election. In the last week of the campaign, Labor Treasurer Ralph Willis used letters purportedly from Jeff Kennett criticising Liberal leader John Howard. The letters were quickly exposed as forgeries. Gobbo, then a Young Labor member, publicly claimed that the forger was then-Liberal staffer and later Senate president Scott Ryan, who had intended for the forgery to pass initial inspection then rebound on Labor. Despite Gobbo's signed statutory declaration, Ryan denied the claim.

== Witness ==
Gobbo, under the pseudonym Witness F, was a witness against Paul Dale, a former policeman accused of corruption. She asserted that Australian authorities have not fulfilled assurances made to her about protecting her safety. The Australian Broadcasting Corporation (ABC) repeated that Gobbo asserted she had received death threats due to her planned testimony. On 16 April 2008, Gobbo's parked car was engulfed in flames. After the death of Carl Williams on 9 April 2010 and Gobbo's refusal to testify, the case was withdrawn. Shortly afterwards Gobbo revealed in an interview with the ABC that she was Witness F in the Paul Dale case.

In February 2019 a 2016 affidavit written by Inspector Brooke Hall stated that Mick Gatto and Horty Mokbel and others had threatened to kill Gobbo if it was proven that she had been providing information to Victoria Police. At the same time it was also revealed that a threat was made against her oldest child.

It was reported in 2019 that Gobbo had declined to enter witness protection as "she feared police more than her former clients" and was using the name Nikki Gobbo.

== Lawyer X scandal ==
Whilst originally understood to be a registered police informant from 2005 to 2009 it was later revealed that Gobbo was recruited as a registered police informant in 1995, 1999 and again in 2005 and was still providing information in 2010 at which time police were instructed that they could no longer accept information from her. Despite this Gobbo continued to offer police information until 2012.

Between September 2005 and January 2009 Gobbo was responsible for more than 5,000 reports and regularly spoke to Purana Taskforce detectives whilst working as a defence lawyer for many of Melbourne's organised crime figures. She passed to Victoria Police information about her clients whilst representing them, leading to the prospect of many convictions being overturned. During media coverage of the scandal in 2018 and 2019, Gobbo's identity was subject to a suppression order, and she was referred to as EF, Lawyer X or Informer 3838. The suppression order was lifted in December 2018 when it was reported that she had represented convicted criminals, Carl Williams and Tony Mokbel. On 3 December 2018, the Premier of Victoria Daniel Andrews ordered the Royal Commission into the Management of Police Informants. As part of its inquiry, the Royal Commission examined the number of, and extent to which, criminal cases may have been affected by the conduct of Gobbo. The commission was due to report to the Government in July 2019; however, as the inquiry proceeded it became clear that this timeline was not achievable. In May 2019 the commission received $20 million in additional funding and a twelve-month extension to July 2020. The commission delivered the final report and recommendations to the Governor on 30 November 2020.

In May 2019, it was reported that some of Gobbo's clients who received criminal convictions could be potentially overturned on appeal, on the basis that Gobbo may have provided information to police that led to the conviction of her clients, whilst at the same time representing her clients as their defence lawyer. At the time of lifting the suppression order to reveal Gobbo's identity, the High Court found that [Gobbo] covertly informing on [her] clients was a "fundamental and appalling breach" of the barrister's obligations. In handing down their decision on appeal from the Supreme Court of Victoria, Appeals Court, the judges commented:

Generally speaking, it is of the utmost importance that assurances of anonymity of the kind that were given to EF [Gobbo] are honoured. If they were not, informers could not be protected and persons would be unwilling to provide information to the police which may assist in the prosecution of offenders. That is why police informer anonymity is ordinarily protected by public interest immunity. But where, as here, the agency of police informer has been so abused as to corrupt the criminal justice system, there arises a greater public interest in disclosure to which the public interest in informer anonymity must yield.

EF's actions in purporting to act as counsel for the Convicted Persons while covertly informing against them were fundamental and appalling breaches of EF's obligations as counsel to her clients and of EF's duties to the court. Likewise, Victoria Police were guilty of reprehensible conduct in knowingly encouraging EF to do as she did and were involved in sanctioning atrocious breaches of the sworn duty of every police officer to discharge all duties imposed on them faithfully and according to law without favour or affection, malice or ill-will. As a result, the prosecution of each Convicted Person was corrupted in a manner which debased fundamental premises of the criminal justice system.

— High Court of Australia

In 2020, whilst the Royal Commission was still in progress, Victoria Police offered to arrange and pay for her to move to a country without an extradition treaty with Australia so that she would not be able to be investigated or prosecuted for her actions in the Lawyer X matter.

After the end of the Royal Commission, Gobbo told the ABC that she was concerned that Victoria Police might attempt to stop her from working with the special investigator appointed to examine if charges should be laid in connection with the matter.

=== Convictions affected ===
The actions of Gobbo in acting as an informant for Victoria Police whilst acting as a lawyer has caused a number of convictions, believed to be over 1,000, to be affected, with several people subsequently set free. Shadow Attorney-General of Victoria Edward O'Donohue said that the Victorian Government must explain how it is going to manage the convictions that are being overturned.

As a consequence of the actions of Gobbo, as disclosed in the AB v CD case and the Royal Commission, there are multiple people who may have been denied a fair trial, with 124 convictions called tainted, others having their convictions reviewed, and more than 1,000 case possibly affected as Gobbo represented or gave legal advice to 1297 individuals with the Royal Commission putting the number at 1,011.

- Tony Mokbel had a conviction for importation of a commercial quantity of cocaine in 2000 quashed by the Victorian Court of Appeal on 15 December 2020 with the President of the Court, Chris Maxwell, calling the actions of Gobbo and those that facilitated her informing "disgraceful". At the time of the ruling Maxwell stated that the court would decide at a later date if the charges would be reinstated but prosecutors of the Commonwealth of Australia noted that they would not continue the matter in that situation.
- Faruk Orman was initially convicted of the 1 May 2002 killing of 43-year-old Victor Peirce but on 26 July 2019, due to what was described as "a substantial miscarriage of justice" in calling Victoria Police to warn them that a key witness against Orman was wavering about giving evidence, the conviction was set aside and a judgement of acquittal was entered. Gobbo, in an interview with ABC, stated that Orman should not have been convicted due to lack of transparency including the possibility that some materials had been withheld from his defence. Even though Chief Commissioner Shane Patton said that "we apologise for getting this wrong", Victoria Police have argued against compensating Faruk as "The miscarriage of justice was due to Gobbo's conduct" and not officers of Victoria Police.
- Zlate Cvetanovski had his conviction for commercial drug trafficking overturned on 30 October 2020 with around 1 year left following 11 years in custody after Gobbo, whilst acting for Zlate, convinced a key witness to co-operate with Victoria Police and testify against him. In quashing the conviction the Court of Appeal justice declared that there had been a "substantial miscarriage of justice" which was followed by prosecutors saying that a retrial of the case would be unjust.

=== Tomato tins ecstasy case ===
On 8 August 2008, Australian Federal Police announced the arrest of 17 people New South Wales, South Australia, Tasmania and Victoria and the seizure of in relation to an attempt to import 4.4 tonnes of ecstasy in what was described by Australian Customs as the world's largest ever ecstasy seizure. The 15-16 million pills were discovered by Customs in Melbourne packed in over 3,000 tomato tins inside a container from Italy on 28 June 2007. This was followed in 2008 by the 24 June 2008 seizure of 150 kg of a white powder that testing indicated was cocaine. By December 2008 the number of people who had been arrested in relation to the attempted importations had reached 26.

At the Royal Commission it was revealed that the drug operation was uncovered due to information provided by Gobbo which she had gotten from her client Rob Karam. Gobbo also provided police with phone numbers which were used to gain additional information on the group. It was also noted that police had concluded that the convictions were tainted in 2011 but even though Chief Commissioner Graham Ashton testified that prosecutors would normally be told, that information was not given to Commonwealth prosecutors.

- Pasquale Barbaro was accused of heading the importation syndicate and, after pleading guilty and agreeing to a deal with prosecutors for a shorter sentence was sentenced to life in prison after the Victorian Supreme Court judge who sentenced him declined to hear the prosecution submission.
- In late 2018 Rob Karam began legal action to challenge his conviction based on the actions of Gobbo including the fact that she had passed on information received from him to Victoria Police.
- After being represented by Gobbo in an early appeal, Saverio Zirilli pleaded guilty to conspiracy to traffic ecstasy pills and cocaine after agreeing to a deal with prosecutors for a shorter sentence and, in 2012, was sentenced to a minimum of 18 years and a maximum of 26 years in jail after the Victorian Supreme Court judge who sentenced him declined to hear the prosecution submission. In 2020 Zirilli applied for leave to appeal his conviction, citing a substantial miscarriage of justice. In applying for bail whilst his appeal was being prepared it was argued that Zirilli would not have pleaded guilty if he had known that Gobbo was an informer, it would likely take at least 12 months for the appeal, and the fact that the Victoria Police would not have known about him without information provided by Gobbo. The application for bail was denied as the prospect of a successful appeal were deemed to be no more than "reasonable".
- John Higgs was sentenced to jail for 18 years for his part in the attempted importation of 15 million pills of ecstasy. In January 2012 Higgs submitted an appeal to the Court of Appeal and in April applied for bail whilst his appeal was being considered arguing that the trail was compromised due to the lack of independence in the advice that Higgs received from Gobbo whilst acting as his solicitor however the bail application was refused based on the likelihood of success of his appeal. Kevin Armstrong who represented the director of public prosecutions argued that there was no disadvantage as Gobbo did not appear in court on behalf of Higgs.
- Salvatore Agresta, who was originally sentenced to 12 years in prison with an 8 year non-parole period, was released on bail on 14 December 2020 by the Victorian Court of Appeal as he had already completed the non-parole period of his sentence. Agresta's appeal is complicated by the fact that he had the sentence combined with that of an additional drug related conviction.

=== Reaction ===
As information was made public before and during the Royal Commission there was widespread discussion in public comment and scholarly publications.

- When the Royal Commission was announced the Independent Broad-based Anti-corruption Commission Commissioner, Robert Redlich, announced support for the enquiry with the broader powers available. Redlich also noted that the outcome of the Royal Commission could be expected to add to the workload of IBAC and consequently require increased funding but it lacks the powers it needs to fully investigate police officers.
- Matt Collins, President of the Victorian Bar expressed the opinion that "It would be wrong, and very unfair to the Victorian legal profession, including the 2,100 practising members of the Victorian Bar, to think that conduct of the kind that has been alleged is anything other than wholly aberrant."
- During a hearing on an appeal by Tony Mokbel, President of the Victorian Court of Appeal Justice Maxwell called the actions of Gobbo and others involved in her informing "disgraceful" and a "matter of profound importance".
- In April 2019 Elyse Methven from the Faculty of Law at the University of Technology Sydney argued in a peer-reviewed article in the Alternative Law Journal that "existing professional rules and common law duties are insufficient to prevent legal advocates from acting as human sources and suggests implications arising from the decision for the application of public interest immunity to human sources".
- Edward O'Donohue, in his role of Shadow Attorney-General in the Parliament of Victoria, said that the behaviour of Gobbo put the "integrity of the Victorian justice system at stake" and was critical of Victoria Police for both their lack of keeping diaries and their failure to provide documents to the Royal Commission, something which he described as "astounding and unacceptable".
- Before the report of the Royal Commission was released, Attorney-General of Victoria Jill Hennessy referred the case of Faruk Orman to the Court of Appeal citing "credible evidence that there may have been a miscarriage of justice in Mr Orman's case arising from Nicola Gobbo's conduct and use as a human source by Victoria Police." After the release of the report she said "What we've seen and learnt throughout this royal commission over the past two years is truly appalling" and promised to implement all of the recommendations.
- Former crown prosecutor in Victoria, Gavin Silbert, said that "It trashes the whole criminal-justice system" and "If people can't seek legal advice without being turned over, being betrayed by a legal practitioner, it's the fundamental root of the whole system we operate on." Silbert also said that charging Gobbo would likely require police officers to also be charged and was of the opinion that the leadership of Victoria Police needed to take responsibility for what happened.
- The Victorian Legal Services Board and Commissioner Fiona McLeay, responded to the final report of the Royal Commission by noting the damage that Gobbo had done to the reputation of the legal profession and justice system and the ethical breaches that she committed whilst undertaking to be involved with implementing the recommendations listed in the report.
- In the early stages of the Royal Commission, Melbourne University law professor Jeremy Gans declared that "Nothing to this extreme, that we know of, has happened anywhere in the world".
- Lawyer Daniel Gurvich KC, supporting the mandatory reporting requirements proposed in the Royal Commission, described the actions of Gobbo as "dispiriting and depressing".

The actions of Gobbo have also prompted a wider discussion of the responsibility that lawyers have to their clients.

==== By those involved ====
- In response to the criticism of Findlay McRae during the Royal Commission, Shane Patton said that McRae "has the full support of Victoria Police" and that he "acquitted himself appropriately in the discharge of his responsibilities".
- Victoria Police said that "it accepts without qualification or reservation" the reprehensibility of facilitating the actions of Gobbo in informing on her clients and blamed systemic failings based on inadequate or misunderstood processes rather than corrupt behaviour by individuals. They also claimed that their intent was for Gobbo to inform on her criminal associates rather than her clients but such an approach became unmanageable due to her actions.
- Victoria Police also noted their dedication to high ethical standards and the obligation of all police to report misconduct.
- During her testimony to the Royal Commission, Deputy Commissioner Wendy Steendam formally acknowledged on behalf of Victoria Police that Gobbo's informing "should not have happened" and argued that any failings were systemic.
- After earlier indicating a willingness to listen to the recommendations of the Royal Commission and stating that "I will take whatever steps are necessary to reform once we get the report", Chief Commissioner Shane Patton called the use of Gobbo a "profound failure by our organisation" and "an indefensible interference in the lawyer-client relationship that is a fundamental requirement for the proper functioning of our criminal justice system". He also promised to provide evidence to appeals courts, an issue that McMurdo raised in her closing remarks whilst saying "we've been totally been open in our disclosure".
- After the release of the recommendations in which McMurdo described some of Ashton's media interviews as suggesting a "desperate times, desperate measures" excuse, former Chief Commissioner Graham Ashton conceded that he should have done more during his time at the OPI including probing more deeply but he "can sleep at night" as he is both satisfied with what he did at the time and is very confident that his conduct was not criminal.
- After being released from prison Faruk Orman called Victoria Police a "powerful, dangerous organisation" and argued for accountability and transparency but stated in an interview with ABC News that he "wouldn't wish jail upon them. I wouldn't wish for them to experience what I've been through, at their hands".
- After having his conviction overturned Zlate Cvetanovski described the actions of Gobbo and Victoria Police as "shocking, scandalous and unprecedented".
- Attorney Ruth Parker for Cvetanovski and Orman noted the damage done to the legal profession and called the actions of Gobbo and Victoria Police "the biggest criminal police-corruption conspiracy in the history of the Western world" and "typical corruption ... you only see in movies".
- A lawyer for two of Gobbo's clients called the Royal Commission "the most difficult proceeding he's been a part of" due to the control that Victoria Police had over choosing what information was made available and what was covered by PII.
- Barrister Con Heliotis who worked with Gobbo on the defending Mokbel on the cocaine importation charge which was later quashed called Gobbo's actions "mind blowing" and wondered why she would do something that "everybody had to know is very wrong".

== Media ==
Gobbo's involvement in the Melbourne gangland killings has been dramatised in the Nine Network Australian television series Informer 3838, produced by Screentime, which premiered on 20 April 2020.

Journalist Adam Shand also hosted a six-part Australian crime podcast series in February–March 2020 about Gobbo called Understate: Lawyer X.

The 9 episodes of season two of the ABC investigative podcast Trace covers the actions of Gobbo and includes interviews with her.

When the TV show Desperate Housewives first premiered in Australia in 2004, Gobbo was one of the Australian women from whom The Age sought a reaction.

== Personal life ==
Gobbo is the cousin of Melbourne barrister Jeremy Gobbo KC. She is also the niece of Sir James Gobbo, a former Governor of Victoria and a former Supreme Court judge.

Gobbo's partner is Richard Barkho. The couple have two children. As of March 2019, Barkho was serving a five-year custodial sentence for drug trafficking.

== See also ==
- AB v CD (Australia)
- Informer 3838
