= Adam Shand =

Australian journalist, writer

- Born: 13 August 1962 (age 63); Melbourne
- Education: Mitchell College of Advanced Education, 1985
- Occupation: Journalist

Adam Shand (born 13 August 1962) is an Australian writer and journalist.

== Journalism ==
Adam Shand started his career in journalism as a cadet on The Australian newspaper in the 1980s covering the rise and fall of entrepreneurs. In 1991, he joined the Nine Network reporting for Business Sunday in Sydney and Melbourne.

In the 1990s Shand worked for three years in Africa as a freelance journalist based in Zimbabwe for media organizations, covering historic events as the rise to power of Nelson Mandela in South Africa, the aftermath of the genocide in Rwanda and the corruption of Zimbabwe's democracy. He returned to Australia in 1997 and worked as a roving reporter for the Nine Network's Today program. Shand also continued to work in the print media, including stints on the Australian Financial Review newspaper in Sydney and Melbourne. In 2003, Shand proposed a unique role writing for The Bulletin magazine while also filing stories for the Nine Network's Sunday program. He held that role until the closure of both the magazine and the show.

He won a Walkley Award in 2007 with Frank McGuire for exposing police corruption in Victoria. During this time he covered Melbourne's bloody ganglands war for the Nine Network and The Bulletin. He also produced exclusive stories on Australia's outlaw biker clubs, Lebanese and Islander gangs in Sydney. He worked full-time for the Nine Network's flagship A Current Affair programme from 2008 until 2010. More recently, Shand has been involved in investigative podcasting.

== Books ==
- Big Shots: The Chilling Inside Story of Carl Williams and the Gangland Wars, 2007, Penguin Books
- The Skull: Informers, Hit Men and Australia's Toughest Cop, 2009, Black Inc Books
- King of Thieves – The Adventures of Arthur Delaney and The Kangaroo Gang, 2010, Allen & Unwin
- Outlaws: Inside The Truth About Australian Bikers, 2011

== Podcasts ==
Shand has hosted several Australian crime podcast series:

- The Trials of The Vampire (2017)
- Adam Shand at Large (2018–2019)
- Real Crime: Australian Detectives (2021–)
- Real Crime: Feature (2021–)
- Real Crime: Interview (2021–)
- State Crime Command (2020–), with the NSW Police
- Understate: Lucille Butterworth (2018)
- Understate: In Plain Sight (2019)
- Understate: Lawyer X (2020)
