= Office of Police Integrity =

The Office of Police Integrity (OPI) was the Australian state of Victoria's independent police oversight and anti-corruption agency established by the Victorian Government in November 2004. OPI ceased operation on 9 February 2013 and was replaced by the Independent Broad-based Anti-corruption Commission (IBAC). OPI's official role was to detect, investigate and prevent police corruption and serious misconduct and to ensure that police members had regard to the human rights set out in the Victorian Charter of Human Rights and Responsibilities.

OPI reported directly to the Victorian Parliament and was led by George Brouwer who was also Victorian Ombudsman. Graham Ashton, later to become Chief Commissioner of Victoria Police, was assistant director.

== History ==
Prior to 2004, criminal investigations in Victoria had exposed alleged links between the underworld and police. OPI was established in response to a widespread concern within the Victorian community about the integrity of its police and the effectiveness of arrangements for oversight and review of police conduct.

Prior to this, the police complaints function belonged with the Ombudsman but it was limited to monitoring and reviewing complaint investigations conducted by police. Only in very limited circumstances could the Ombudsman investigate those complaints. The legislation creating OPI included the power to conduct own motion investigations.

== Oversight ==
OPI performed its oversight function by reviewing police policies and procedures and making recommendations to reform and improve these. For example, OPI conducted large scale reviews the Discipline System and the Management Intervention Model, the Management of High Profile Cases, the Investigative Process Following a Death Associated with Police Contact and Police Use of Stop and Search Powers.

OPI also provided educational activities and programs to promote and support professional and ethical behaviour in Victoria Police members.

== Inefficiency in dealing with Victoria Police corruption ==
In early 2007, Don Stewart, a retired Supreme Court judge, called for a Royal Commission into Victorian police corruption. Stewart alleged that the force is riddled with corruption that the Office of Police Integrity was unable to deal with.

== Investigations ==
OPI's investigative capabilities included phone tapping powers and specialist high tech and covert investigation methods. Investigations were sometimes conducted in conjunction with the Victorian Police Ethical Standards Department. OPI investigators came from a wide variety of backgrounds and have experience with overseas, interstate and federal police forces.

OPI investigations were undertaken for matters ranging from improper relationships, drugs and police and informer management.

The Special Investigations Monitor (now ceased) oversaw responsible and correct use of certain OPI powers, including the exercise of its coercive powers.

== Hearings ==
From the late 1970s commissions of inquiry throughout Australia identified that traditional law enforcement methods were inadequate to address sustained action against either organised crime or corruption. Since then, specialist independently statutory bodies, such as the OPI, have emerged in most states. OPI and other like agencies have non-traditional powers derived from a convergence of legal processes adopted from both inquisitorial and adversarial systems.

OPI conducted a number of public hearings which gained a great amount of media and public attention.

In September 2006, an investigation into physical assault by members of the Armed Offenders Squad (now disbanded) culminated in a public hearing. During the hearing, covertly recorded material of the actual incident was played. members were shown to have committed perjury. This hearing generated strong public debate, with both supportive and critical commentary.

A November 2007 hearing involved matters relating to misconduct in public office, propensity of police witnesses to lie on oath, information leaks and attempts to pervert the course of justice. The OPI investigation that resulted in the hearing involved, amongst others, Victoria Police Assistant Commissioner Noel Ashby (now resigned), Victoria Police Media Director Steve Linnell (now resigned) and Police Association Secretary, Paul Mullett (now suspended). The public interest was immense and media outlets Australia-wide reported the hearing.

== Corruption Prevention & Education ==
In addition to detecting, investigating and exposing serious misconduct or corruption, part of OPI's mandate was to understand the underlying causes of this sort of conduct. This can result in measures that will prevent it from occurring again.

OPI had a dedicated corruption, prevention and education unit. One of the key tasks of the unit was to identify areas of policing or policing systems that are susceptible to the development of corrupt, unethical or unprofessional behaviour. Having identified problem areas, the unit scoped solutions from within Victoria Police or other jurisdictions to strengthen systems, improve ethical and professional standards and reduce the vulnerability of Victoria Police to corruption or serious misconduct.

To engage with rank and file police, the unit conducted information sessions in metropolitan and rural regions. The sessions aimed to give police accurate information about OPI and inform them of their rights and responsibilities in the event of an OPI investigation.

== Independent Broad-based Anti-corruption Commission (IBAC) ==
The functions previously performed by OPI have now been subsumed by the Independent Broad-based Anti-corruption Commission.

== See also ==
- Victoria Police
- Crime in Melbourne

General:

- Police brutality
- Police misconduct
- Police corruption
- Blue code of silence

== OPI Reports ==
- A Fair and Effective Victoria Police Discipline System (Oct 2007)
- Ceja Task Force - Drug Related Corruption (Jul 2007)
- Conditions for persons in custody (Jul 2006)
- Exposing corruption within senior levels of Victoria Police (Feb 2008)
- Investigation into the publication of One Down, One Missing (Sep 2005)
- Investigation into the Victoria Police's Management of the Law Enforcement Assistance Program (LEAP) (Mar 2005)
- Past Patterns, Future Directions: Victoria Police and the problem of corruption and serious misconduct (Feb 2007)
- Report on the 'Kit Walker' investigations (Dec 2007)
- Report on the Leak of a Sensitive Victoria Police Information Report (Feb 2005)
- Review of fatal shootings by Victoria Police (Nov 2005)
- Review of the Victoria Police Witness Protection Program (Jul 2005)
