= George Brouwer =

Australian public servant

George Brouwer was the Ombudsman for the state Victoria for a decade He was appointed to the position in 2004. His term expired in March 2014, and he was succeeded by Deborah Glass. Concurrently with work as Ombudsman, Brouwer was also head of Victoria's Office of Police Integrity.

Mr Brouwer was educated at Aloysius College (Netherlands), Xavier College (Victoria), University of Melbourne and Australian National University.

Mr Brouwer has the following qualifications:

- Master of Laws (Australian National University)
- Bachelor of Laws (University of Melbourne)
- Bachelor of Arts (Hons) (University of Melbourne)
- Graduate of the École Nationale d’Administration (Paris)
- Barrister (Non-practising) (Supreme Court, NSW and ACT; High Court of Australia).

Mr Brouwer has over thirty years experience working in federal and state public service including head of statutory authorities and abroad giving him experience in public policy, strategic development, and change management at senior executive and chief executive levels.

Mr Brouwer has worked in the Commonwealth Department of Prime Minister and Cabinet under Harold Holt, John McEwen, William McMahon, John Gorton, Gough Whitlam and Malcolm Fraser.

At State level, Mr Brouwer has worked as Chief Executive in the Victorian Department of Premier and Cabinet under John Cain and Joan Kirner, and in the Department of Business and Employment under Jeff Kennett.
