= AB v CD (Australia) =

High Court of Australia judgment

AB v CD; EF v CD
- Court: High Court of Australia
- Full case name: AB (a pseudonym) v CD (a pseudonym); EF (a pseudonym) v CD (a pseudonym)
- Decided: 5 November 2018
- Citation: [2018] HCA 58

Court membership
- Judges sitting: Kiefel CJ, Bell, Gageler, Keane, Nettle, Gordon & Edelman JJ

Case opinions
- special leave to appeal revoked (per Kiefel CJ, Bell, Gageler, Keane, Nettle, Gordon & Edelman JJ)

AB v CD; EF v CD is a decision of the High Court of Australia.

The decision is notable for revealing the 'Lawyer X' scandal to the Australian public. At issue was the use of the criminal barrister Nicola Gobbo as a secret informant by the Victorian Police.

Gobbo's assistance as an informant enabled a large number of prosecutions by the Victorian Crown; especially against organised criminals. Her assistance was in breach of numerous legal duties she owed to her clients.

In its reasons, the High Court declared that the public interest in maintaining the anonymity of police informants was outweighed by the public interest in disclosing the details of what had occurred. In its view, the 'agency of police informer' had been 'so abused as to corrupt the criminal justice system'. The High Court therefore revoked special leave and affirmed the Court of Appeal's judgment.

Details of the case became public one month after the judgment. This ignited significant public debate, especially due to concerns that following the judgment, numerous convictions related to the Melbourne gangland killings and other organised crime would be expunged. Following calls for a public inquiry, Daniel Andrews the Premier of Victoria announced in December 2018 the creation of the Royal Commission into the Management of Police Informants to investigate the scandal.

== Facts ==
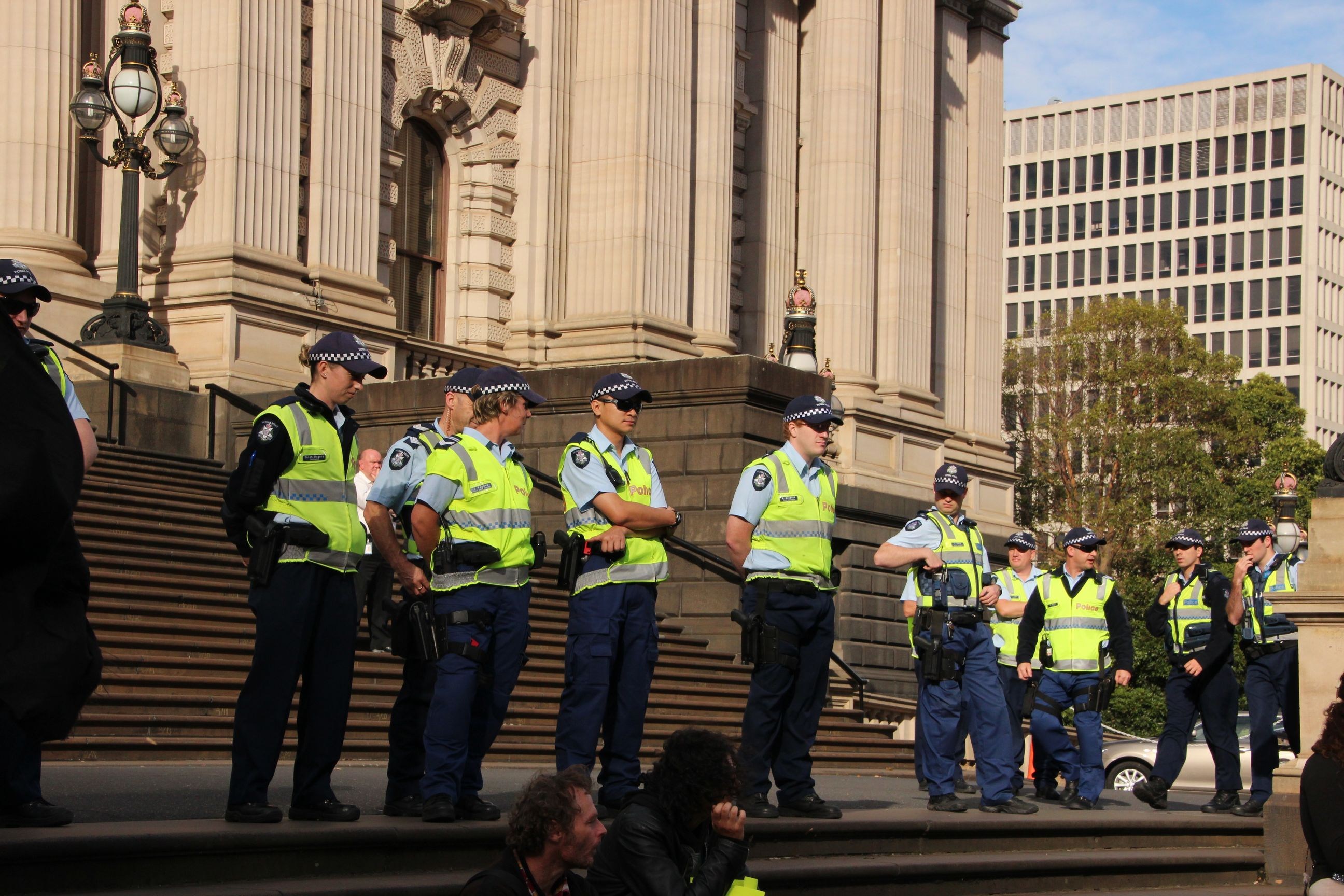
Victoria Police officers

In February 2015 the Victorian IBAC provided a report to the Victorian Police (AB) and Victorian Director of Public Prosecutions (CD). The report concerned the way Victoria Police had deployed Nicola Gobbo (EF) as a police informant in obtaining criminal convictions against Tony Mokbel and six criminal associates. (Note: Gobbo's codename as police informant was 'witness 3838') In the report, it was found that while Gobbo had been purporting to act as counsel for the convicted persons; she had provided information to the Victorian Police which undermined their ability to defend themselves at trial. Following this report, John Champion as Director of Public Prosecutions (DPP) determined that he was under a duty to disclose some of the information contained within the IBAC report to the persons who had been convicted.

In the months which followed, Victoria Police undertook an assessment of the risk to Gobbo if the DPP disclosed the information. They concluded that the risk of death would be 'almost certain'. On 10 June 2016, the police commenced proceedings in the Supreme Court seeking declarations that the information that the Victorian Director of Public Prosecutions proposed to disclose was subject to public interest immunity. On 11 November Gobbo was added as plaintiff. On 15 November Gobbo instituted a separate proceeding on the basis of an equitable obligation of confidence.

Both proceedings were heard together in camera without notice to the convicted persons. Nevertheless, advocates presented arguments on those persons' behalf as amici curiae; the Victorian Equal Opportunity and Human Rights Commission and Commonwealth Director of Public Prosecutions both intervened after being granted leave, and advocated for disclosure.

On 19 June 2017 Ginnane J gave judgment at first instance dismissing the arguments of AB and EF. In his judgment, the public interest in preserving the anonymity of police informers and the welfare of Gobbo and her children was outweighed by those favoring disclosure. Reasons favoring disclosure included the assistance the information might afford to the convicted persons in having their convictions overturned, and the maintenance of public confidence in the integrity of the criminal justice system.

On 21 November 2017 the Court of Appeal (Ferguson CJ, Osborn J, and McLeish JJA) dismissed AB & EF's appeals, on the basis of similar reasons to the trial judge.

On 9 May 2018, AB was granted special leave to appeal to the High Court.

== Judgment ==
After receiving extensive written submissions, the High Court regarded the 'only arguable issue' underpinning the various grounds of appeal was whether 'it was no longer possible adequately to protect the safety of EF and her children in the event of disclosure'. The court invited arguments from the police as to further detailed evidence of what could be done to secure the safety of Gobbo and her children in the event of disclosure. In effect, the police submitted that Gobbo agreeing to enter into a witness protection program would be a possible solution to that issue.

Following that submission, the High Court invited oral arguments, and subsequently delivered a unanimous judgment ordering that special leave be revoked.

The court said of the Lawyer X scandal generally; 'it is greatly to be hoped that it will never be repeated'. They went on to say:

'(Gobbo's) actions in purporting to act as counsel for the Convicted Persons while covertly informing against them were fundamental and appalling breaches of (her) obligations as counsel to her clients and of (her) duties to the court. Likewise, Victoria Police were guilty of reprehensible conduct in knowingly encouraging (Gobbo) to do as she did and were involved in sanctioning atrocious breaches of the sworn duty of every police officer to discharge all duties imposed on them faithfully and according to law without favour or affection, malice or ill-will.

As a result, the prosecution of each Convicted Person was corrupted in a manner which debased fundamental premises of the criminal justice system.'

...

the maintenance of the integrity of the criminal justice system demands that the information be disclosed and that the propriety of each Convicted Person's conviction be re-examined in light of the information. The public interest in preserving EF's anonymity must be subordinated to the integrity of the criminal justice system.

The court then acknowledged the 'grave risk of harm' if Gobbo refused to enter witness protection. It also acknowledged why Gobbo had declined to do so thus far, (Note: Gobbo did not trust the police to maintain her confidentiality. She apparently was more willing to bear the risk of going without protection than subject herself to the limitations and burdens of such a program.) and the 'large measure of responsibility' the Victorian Police had for the whole situation. (Note: Victoria Police were responsible in the words of the court for having 'initially encouraged her to inform against her clients as she did') Nevertheless, the court ordered that it was 'essential in the public interest' for the information to be disclosed.

Speaking generally, the court concluded by saying it is of the 'utmost importance' that anonymity assurances be honoured; and as such be ordinarily protected by public interest immunity. However, 'where ... the agency of police informer has been so abused as to corrupt the criminal justice system, there arises a greater public interest in disclosure to which the informer anonymity must yield'.

The court concluded by commenting that if Gobbo was unwilling to enter the witness protection program, she would be 'bound by the consequences'; and that in the interests of protecting her children, the government could take them away from her.

== Significance and aftermath ==
The judgment was made public one month after the court's decision. Once publicly revealed, the lawyer X scandal generated significant outcry visible across Australian news media. Concerns were raised that due to the revealed police behavior numerous convictions related to the Melbourne gangland killings would be expunged. Estimates as to the number of cases affected by the affair range between 386 and 600.

Prominent silks publicly called for a formal public inquiry following the judgment. On December 5 a royal commission was ordered by the Victorian Government into the scandal. The 'Royal Commission into the Management of Police Informants' is due to deliver its final report in on November 30, 2020.

Nicola Gobbo's name was not formally revealed to the public until 5 February 2019. Nevertheless Melbourne Law School criminal law professor Jeremy Gans described Gobbo's name as a 'theoretical secret'; and it is clear from reporting at the time of the judgment that Gobbo's name was already widely known.

The role that the judiciary played in the 'Lawyer X' scandal has also been criticized by academics. In a contemporaneous blog post hosted by the University of Melbourne, Professor Gans wrote:

'Amidst the many ramifications of the scandal, I hope that Victoria's courts will themselves reflect on two indirect roles they played in these events. First, in the midst of the police's use of EF as an informant against her clients, Victoria's courts (and the High Court) ruled in favour of novel policing methods, despite concerns that their use would override suspects' common law rights and invite police corruption. Second, throughout the aftermath of Melbourne's gangland war, Victoria's courts imposed extensive suppression orders that, while well-intentioned, have largely prevented the public from gaining a full understanding of the methods used by Victoria Police in response.'

Nevertheless, much of the public commentary regarding the case has focused upon the actions of the Victorian Police and Gobbo. It is anticipated that the final report of the royal commission will declare that Tony Mokbel did not receive a fair trial as a result of the affair, and perhaps also Pat Barbaro.

=== Notable quashed convictions ===
On 26 July 2019, Faruk Orman was released from jail after 12 years in prison. He was the first person to have their conviction quashed as a result of the scandal. Orman was found guilty by a jury in 2002 for his role as getaway driver in the killing of Victor Peirce.

On 30 October 2020, Zlate Cvetanovski was released after 11 years in prison. He had been convicted for drug trafficking.
