= Independent Broad-based Anti-corruption Commission =

Integrity agency in Victoria, Australia

Independent Broad-based Anti-corruption Commission (IBAC)
- Abbreviation: IBAC

Agency overview
- Formed: 1 July 2012
- Preceding agency: Office of Police Integrity
- Employees: 200
- Annual budget: A$31 million (2014–2015)

Jurisdictional structure
- Operations jurisdiction: Victoria, Australia
- Governing body: Parliament of Victoria
- Constituting instrument: Independent Broad-based Anti-corruption Commission Act 2011 (Vic)

Operational structure
- Headquarters: Level 1, 459 Collins Street, Melbourne, Victoria, Australia
- Agency executives: Victoria Elliott, Commissioner; Alison Byrne, CEO

Website
- ibac.vic.gov.au

The Independent Broad-based Anti-corruption Commission (IBAC) is Victoria's anti-corruption integrity agency with jurisdiction over the public sector. It does this by:

- investigating serious corruption and police misconduct
- informing the public sector, police and the community about the risks and impacts of corruption and police misconduct.

== Overview ==
IBAC's jurisdiction includes:

- public sector agencies and bodies
- local councils
- members of Parliament, electorate officers and ministerial advisors
- the judiciary
- Victoria Police personnel, including sworn and unsworn staff and Protective Services Officers.

IBAC is one of three key independent authorities in the Victorian integrity system. The other agencies are the Ombudsman of Victoria and the Victorian Auditor-General's Office.

Under the Independent Broad-based Anti-corruption Commission Act 2011 (No. 66 of 2011), IBAC is accountable to the people of Victoria and reports to the state Parliament.

It is also subject to scrutiny through:

- the Victorian Inspectorate
- the IBAC Parliamentary Committee

== History ==
The Independent Broad-based Anti-corruption Commission Act 2011 (IBAC Act) was passed on 29 November 2011, establishing:

- the role of the Commissioner
- the parliamentary committee to oversee IBAC
- IBAC's prevention and education functions.

In 2012, the IBAC Act was amended to grant IBAC certain investigative powers as well as define its main areas of jurisdiction. Further legislation was subsequently introduced to replace the former Whistleblowers Protection Act 2001 with the Protected Disclosure Act 2012 (No. 85 of 2012).

IBAC was formally established on 1 July 2012 and became fully operational in February 2013.

== Powers ==
IBAC has powers to effectively investigate allegations of serious corrupt conduct. These include the power to:

- compel the production of documents and objects
- enter and search premises
- seize documents and objects
- use surveillance devices
- intercept telecommunications
- hold private and public hearings
- require people to give evidence at a hearing.

IBAC must apply to the Supreme Court or other courts and tribunals before exercising some powers. The Public Interest Monitor reviews and makes submissions on IBAC's applications for surveillance device warrants and telecommunications interception warrants.

Prior to its establishment, the powers granted under the IBAC Act were publicly criticised. Following establishment, former Court of Appeal judge and chair of the Accountability Round Table, Stephen Charles QC, said the IBAC legislation was "seriously flawed" and that IBAC required investigatory powers similar to those of the New South Wales Independent Commission Against Corruption.

IBAC's Commissioner Stephen O'Bryan QC stated:

"As with any new and complex legislation, it is not until it is applied in practice over time that areas for improvement are best identified. I am confident that the IBAC Act provides a solid initial framework for Victoria's new integrity regime and that, as with any such legislation, it will transform over time. Certainly, if elements of the Act fall short of what is needed to carry out most effectively its objectives and purposes, I have publicly stated that I will seek appropriate amendment."

After a year of full operation, the commissioner determined some areas of the IBAC Act would benefit from amendment. Detailed in the April 2014 Special report following IBAC's first year of being fully operational, these included:

- the extent to which IBAC must reasonably be satisfied before investigation complaints or allegations of corrupt conduct
- the absence of the common law offence of misconduct in public office as something IBAC can investigate
- the desirability of mandatory reporting of possible corrupt conduct to IBAC by public sector body heads and council CEOs.

In September 2014, the Integrity Legislation Amendment Bill 2014 was introduced to Parliament. The bill proposed amendments to:

- the threshold for conducting investigations
- the inclusion of misconduct in public office
- the ability to conduct preliminary investigations
- the introduction of mandatory reporting for principal officers of public bodies.

The bill was not passed during the final session of Parliament before the November 2014 Victorian state election.

On 1 February 2015, the newly sworn-in Labor government announced it was undertaking a review of the Victorian integrity system, including changes to IBAC's powers. A string of investigations in 2015 renewed public support to bring forward changes to the IBAC Act, with the government confirming its commitment to introduce a bill to state parliament in 2015.

== Investigations ==
=== Operation Leven ===
In July 2014 IBAC appointed former Justice of the Supreme Court of Victoria Murray Kellam to undertake an enquiry into Victoria Police human source management. After examining 14 witnesses under oath and reviewing more than 5500 documents Kellam produced a confidential report to IBAC in February 2015 finding a high order of negligence in the handling of human sources by Victoria Police. In 2016 it was claimed that documents had been withheld from the enquiry by Victoria Police but the complaint was dismissed. After these enquiries concluded that there was an obligation to inform some of Gobbo's former clients of her actions both Gobbo and Victoria Police launched legal action to keep the information suppressed which eventually became the AB v CD case. This in turn led to the Royal Commission into the management of Victoria Police informants.

=== Operation Dunham ===
Operation Dunham examined allegations of serious corruption at the Department of Education and Training (DET) focusing on:

- how contracts around the online learning portal (Ultranet) were tendered for and awarded
- the personal and business connections between department employees and businesses involved in the Ultranet project
- whether current or former department employees released confidential information, or used their position to influence procurement processes
- whether department employees received payments, gifts, travel, employment opportunities or other benefits because they were involved in the Ultranet tender or procurement processes
- department procurement and conflict of interest processes, and organisational culture.

=== Operation Ord ===
Operation Ord examined allegations of serious corruption at the DET focusing on the:

- involvement of current and former DET staff in the establishment of 'banker schools'
- allocation of funds to schools for goods and services that were not always provided
- misuse of department funds.

=== Operation Sandon ===
In late 2019 and early 2020, IBAC conducted public hearings for Operation Sandon, which examined allegations of serious corrupt conduct in relation to planning and property development decisions at the outer suburban City of Casey council. focusing on:

- the transparency and integrity of planning and property development decision making within Victoria
- the improper influence of gifts, hospitality or benefits on public officers involved in planning and property development decision-making
- whether the use of professional lobbyists or planning consultants to lobby State and local government has resulted in undue influence over planning and property development decision making within Victoria.

=== Stuart Bateson ===
In 2019, Victoria Police Commander Stuart Bateson was charged with leaking confidential information from IBAC to a junior police officer contrary. Bateson was found guilty on 25 June 2021 and sentenced in August 2021 when he was fined $6,000 without a conviction being recorded.

=== Wayne Dean ===
In May 2022, IBAC held hearings into Detective Sergeant Wayne Dean from Victoria Police examining allegations of misconduct and the appropriateness of some of his relationships such as Dean's relationship with Mick Gatto which included the gift of tickets with a face value of $4,400 and Dean giving evidence at Gatto's trial for the murder of Andrew "Benji" Veniamin. Dean claimed that he did not know until 2016 that Gatto had an extensive criminal history and admitted that he should have registered Gatto as a "declarable association" indicating that a conflict of interest may arise. Dean admitted to accepting cash from debt collector Bill Meletsis and misusing his position as a police officer to pressure debtors to pay and is being investigated for unauthorised access to and distribution of materials from police systems.

=== Operation Watts ===
In July 2022, IBAC, in collaboration with the Victorian Ombudsman, handed down their final report of their investigation into allegations of misuse of electorate office and ministerial office staff and resources for branch stacking and other party-related activities by members of the Labor Party's Victorian branch.

The findings of the report include:

- Misuse of publicly funded staff for factional work, in particular, by Adem Somyurek and Marlene Kairouz.
- Much of the work that some publicly funded staff were allocated was related to branch stacking, party purposes, and factional matters, in particular, by Adem Somyurek and Marlene Kairouz.
- Publicly funded jobs given to factional allies and operatives in the absence of any official work for them to do. This included more than 15 friends and relatives of MPs being employed in ministerial and electorate offices.
- Factors that lead to these practices which include a culture of branch stacking, limited safeguards or accountability, and an absence of clear legal guidance on use of staff.

The report set out a list of 21 recommendations to address ongoing corruption risks and promote integrity within the Victorian Government.

Among other things, the report found that "unethical practices are embedded in the Victorian branch of the ALP and are systemic to all of the ALP's factions" and "that these practices have been approved or condoned by the party leadership for decades". Shortly after, IBAC Commissioner, The Hon Robert Redlich AM KC, confirmed that in saying "party leadership", he included Daniel Andrews and that Andrews, at a minimum, was aware of the conduct outlined in the investigation.
