= Organised crime in Australia =

Prevalent criminal organisations and activities in Australia

In Australia, organised crime involves the activities of various groups of syndicates or crime families and underworld activities including drug trafficking, contract killing, racketeering and other crimes.

== European-Australian networks ==
=== The Carlton Crew ===
The Carlton Crew, based in Melbourne, is an Italian-Australian criminal organisation from Melbourne, Victoria. It was formed in the late 1970s and was named after the Melbourne suburb in which it is based. The organisation had a strong rivalry with the Honoured Society and the Calabrese Family, both of which were Calabrian 'Ndrangheta groups also based in Melbourne. The Carlton Crew had a strong role in the infamous Melbourne gangland killings.

=== The Honoured Society ===
The Honoured Society is a Calabrian 'Ndrangheta group based in Melbourne. In 1963, it was reportedly involved in the Victoria Market Murders. It was led by gangster Frank Benvenuto until his slaying in 2000. Tony Romeo, another high-ranking member, was shot in 2002. Ndrangheta operating in Australia include the Arena, Italiano, Muratore, Benvenuto and Condello clans.

=== Serbian mafia ===
The first Serbian mafiosi came to Australia in the late '70s, organised in a Yugoslav clan, their headquarters were some 15 kafanas in Sydney, Wollongong and Melbourne. In the '80s the Serbian Mafia was reinforced with the arrival of Serbian immigrants. Milivoje Matović "Miša Kobra", arrived to Sydney in 1986 and became a known gambler who organised big games. His younger brother Braca owed money to the gang of Žorž Stanković, Žorž sent his son Batica for Miša Kobra whose friend Boža Cvetić threw down the street after he had pointed a gun at them. Batica was deported to Serbia and Braca was killed in the meantime. Žorž was killed in 1993 and his son Batica in 1996. In 2005 interviews with Australian Serbs, it was said some 20 Zemun clan members operated in Australia at the time, double the number working prior to Operation Sablja. Serbian boxer Božidar Cvetić who in 2002 was stabbed, now worked as a bouncer in Australia said that Australian police had shown him pictures of some 150 Serbian criminals active in Australia. In May 2007, Australian police saw recruitment to organised crime motorcycle gangs from young Serbs.

=== Albanian mafia ===
Godfather of an Albanian mafia family 'Daut Kadriovski' gained attention of Australian Authorities after creating a drug pipeline through Albanian and Croatian communities in Sydney and Brisbane.

== North Asian networks ==
North Asian networks include the Russian mafia and Yakuza.

In 2024, the Organized Crime and Corruption Reporting Project (OCCRP) and The Age reported on connections between Chinese organised crime figures and drug trafficking in Australia via Fiji.

== Outlaw motorcycle gangs ==
Outlaw motorcycle gangs are present in Australia, with international outlaw clubs like the Bandidos, Hells Angels and Gypsy Jokers as well as other groups that are localised and less widespread. The outlaw bikie scene in Australia is unique in the sense that it avoided the consolidation that occurred elsewhere. In the United States, the four major biker gangs are the Hells Angels, the Outlaws, the Bandidos and Pagans. Elsewhere, the major biker gangs are the local branches of American gangs. The Hells Angels dominate Canada while Europe is divided primarily between the Hells Angels and the Bandidos. The Canadian journalists William Marsden and Julian Sher wrote: "Unlike in Europe or North America, neither the Hells Angels nor the Bandidos succeeded in entirely vanquishing the fiercely independent Australian bikie gangs".

One of the major events in Australian motorcycle gang criminal history was what became known as the Milperra Massacre in 1984, where a fight between two gangs, the Comancheros and the Bandidos in Milperra in the South of Sydney, turned into a gun battle that claimed seven lives - six gang members and a civilian. Despite the shock caused by the Milperra Massacre, bikie gangs increased in number after 1984 due to the profits offered by selling methamphetamine. A consolidation began in 1994 as the larger clubs eliminated the smaller clubs, which caused 35 murders between 1994-2000. The number of clubs was reduced down from 178 in 1994 to 32 in 2000.

While conflict between various clubs has been ever present, in 2008 the gang conflict escalated, with 13 shootings taking place in Sydney in the space of two weeks. Gang violence has become high-profile to the point where various state governments have taken steps to change laws to focus on the problem, and police have set up groups to deal with the threat, including the Crime Gang Task Force in South Australia Bikie gangs in South Australia at least, are involved in drugs, murder, extortion and other forms of intimidation and violence. Bikie gangs in South Australia have diversified their activities into both legal and illegal commercial business enterprises. In Western Australia they are involved in the drug trade Laws to deal with Bikie gangs have been introduced into Northern Territory, South Australia, and are presently being looked at in NSW and Queensland. In early 2009, Comanchero Motorcycle Club and Hells Angels were also believed to be involved in a clash at Sydney Airport. One man was beaten to death in plain view of witnesses at the airport, and police estimated as many as 15 men were involved in the violence. Police documents detail the brawl as a result of a Comanchero gang member and a Hells Angels biker being on the same flight from Melbourne. Four suspects were arrested as a result of the altercation. Including two murders in the capital city, 4 people were killed in the space of a week in Canberra and in Sydney. As a result of heightening violence, New South Wales Premier Nathan Rees announced the state police anti-gang squad would be boosted to 125 members from 50.

Clubs in Australia include:

- Bandidos - The Bandidos are one of the "Big Four" gangs identified by the FBI. They have 19 chapters across Australia and between 250 and 400 members. One of the clubs that has actively recruited from ethnic groups in recent years.
- Coffin Cheaters - They have chapters in Western Australia, Victoria, New South Wales and Queensland, as well as in Norway. They have between 200 and 300 members.
- Comanchero - One of the oldest outlaw clubs in Australia and internationally, its headquarters are in Western Sydney. They have between 300 - 350 members with chapters in NSW, SA, CAN, WA, VIC & QLD.
- Gypsy Joker - The Gypsy Joker MC, an American-formed club, are most notorious for the 2001 car-bomb murders of West Australian police senior investigator Don Hancock and Lawrence Lewis. They have between 200 and 300 members in Australia.
- Hells Angels - Founded in the US but now active worldwide. In Australia, they have 150-250 members and are allied with the Nomads.
- Nomads - The Nomads club has no website and is not as widely known as other clubs, but does have a significant presence in the press as an outlaw motorcycle club engaged in allegedly illegal activities.
- Notorious - The club Notorious, a recent ethnically Middle Eastern based gang, have started competing with existing traditionally Anglo-Celtic bikie gangs, in a turf war for drug sales. Notorious is reportedly using members of the Middle Eastern and Islander communities in Sydney, and are believed to be recruiting members of those backgrounds from other clubs. They have between 150-200 members.
- Rebels - The Rebels are the largest outlaw motorcycle club in Australia, and have 29 chapters. They are a more traditional club and are run by former boxer and founding member, Alex Vella. They are by far the largest club in Australia with around 2,000 members.

== East and southeast Asian gangs ==
In terms of Chinese gang activity, highly organised crime syndicates in Sydney have looked to Chinese youths on student visas for their recruitment drives. Multimillion-dollar prostitution rackets have been operating in Melbourne for several years, one of the largest by Mulgrave woman Xue Di Yan.

In Australia, the major importer of illicit drugs in recent decades has been 'The Company', according to police. This is a conglomerate run by triad bosses which focuses particularly on methamphetamine and cocaine. It has laundered money through junkets for high-stakes gamblers who visit Crown Casinos in Australia and Macau.

Gangs include: Triad; Spider Boys; Sing Wah; Yee Tong,

Operation Illipango, an Australian Crime Commission inquiry, investigated alleged heroin shipments from Cambodia to Australia concealed in loads of timber. Cambodian businessman Hun To, nephew of then-prime minister Hun Sen, was named in connection with the inquiry and denied involvement in trafficking and money laundering.

== Latin and South American cartels ==
The now-defunct Bogota Cartel of Colombia had operations in Australia.

The Mexican drug cartel Sinaloa Cartel has infiltrated Australia.

== Middle Eastern gangs ==
Middle-Eastern gangs rose to prominence around 1995–1996 in Australia, most prominently in Sydney. By 2000, the middle Eastern gangs had gained ground in Sydney, conducting extortion against nightclubs, ram raids, and car theft. More recently, drive-by shootings have become more common, with tit for tat drive by shooting starting as early as 1998, and becoming more common in recent years. including a drive by machine gun attack on a police station in Lakemba, Sydney. In 2006, concerns over the lack of intelligence in the wake of revenge attacks, which included stabbings and assaults, by Middle Eastern youths following the Cronulla riots; led the NSW Police to set up a permanent Middle-Eastern Organised Crime squad similar in vein to the existing Asian Crime Squad.

As of 2024, the ongoing feud between the Alameddine crime network and the Brothers for Life of the Hamzy family has led to at least 11 shooting deaths.

== African gangs ==
In 2016, the Liberal Party began to campaign against what it identified as "South Sudanese gangs" in Melbourne, following riots at the Moomba Festival in the city. This campaign was criticised by local community leaders, and the Australian Greens MP Adam Bandt said it was using "race to win votes and whip up hatred". South Sudanese Australians commit around 1% of crime in Melbourne, which is higher than their share of the population (0.14%), but is not adjusted for the low average age of the South Sudanese-born population, which can account for their over-representation in the statistics.

In 2018, then-Prime Minister Malcolm Turnbull described the supposed presence of South Sudanese gangs in Melbourne as a "real concern", with then-Home Affairs Minister Peter Dutton claiming that Melburnians were afraid to leave their homes at night due to gang-related violence. Then-Victorian Premier Daniel Andrews rejected Turnbull's comments.

The debate on "African gangs" in Melbourne was a key part in the Victorian Liberal Party's campaign for the 2018 state election under then-Opposition Leader Matthew Guy.

Criminologists and the police commissioners of Melbourne say that episodes of youth criminality occurring in Melbourne do not amount to "gang activity" or organised crime, according to the definition used by law enforcement. The debate around so-called "African gangs" was highly racialised and resulted in many examples of racist discourse on social media, leading Anthony Kelly, executive officer of Melbourne's Flemington and Kensington Community Legal Centre, to describe it as a "racialised moral panic". The aftermath of the panic caused black people in Melbourne to fear that they would be arrested simply for congregating in public spaces, with South Sudanese people reporting high levels of targeting by police.

== Prominent individuals ==
- John Wren, controversial Melbourne businessman, who is alleged to have masterminded a large-scale SP bookmaking operation based in Melbourne in the early 1900s, and who was the model for John West, the subject of the famous Frank Hardy novel Power Without Glory.
- Abe Saffron, notorious 20th-century Sydney crime figure.
- Lenny McPherson, notorious 20th-century Sydney crime figure.
- George Freeman, notorious 20th-century Sydney crime figure.
- Percival John (Perce) Galea, notorious 20th-century Sydney crime figure.
- Robert Trimbole, Griffith-based 'Ndrangheta boss and drug trafficker.
- Terry Clark New Zealand-born drug syndicate boss ("Mr Big" of the "Mr Asia" syndicate)
- Melbourne-based drug dealers Tony Mokbel and Dennis Allen
- Chopper Read, Melbourne-based standover man and hitman.
- Kath Pettingill (born 1935), matriarch of the Melbourne-based criminal family, the Pettingill family.
- Dennis Bruce Allen, member of the Melbourne-based criminal family, the Pettingill family.
- Victor George Peirce, member of the Melbourne-based criminal family, the Pettingill family.
- John Ibrahim, member of the Sydney-based Ibrahim criminal family.

== Activities ==
=== Violence ===
==== Homicide ====
Examples of homicide include: Melbourne gangland killings; Sydney Airport bikie killing; John Newman.

==== Terrorism ====
Australia has known acts of modern terrorism since the 1960s, while the federal parliament, since the 1970s, has enacted legislation seeking to specifically target terrorism. In terms of the predictors of and motivations behind such activities, theories of social disorganisation and anomie describe the clear political and social focus. The Australian government's foreign affairs, defence and humanitarian policies are also pertinent to this analysis, justifying the application of cross-cultural conflict.

These include the Sydney Hilton bombing and Turkish consulate bombing, as well as the activities of militant Islamic groups such as Faheem Khalid; Mohammed Abderrahman (aka Willie Brigitte); Joseph T. Thomas; the Sydney Five and 2005 Sydney terrorism plot.; the Benbrika Group in Melbourne (including Abdul Nacer Benbrika); and the Holsworthy Barracks terror plot.

==== Arson ====
An example of arson is the Whiskey Au Go Go fire.

==== Sexual assault ====
An example of sexual assault is the Sydney gang rapes.

==== Protection rackets, extortion and coercion ====
Examples of protection rackets, extortion and coercion include Alphonse Gangitano.

=== Financial crime ===
==== Money laundering ====
Money laundering may be connected with legitimate operations, and has economic impacts.

==== Counterfeiting ====
In relation to counterfeiting, all State, Territory and Federal police are authorised under the Crimes (Currency) Act 1981 to seize and prosecute currency related matters, including domestic and foreign currencies. Counterfeiting can range across films, music, games and other electronic appliances, software, and fashion.

==== Tax Evasion ====
Tax Evasion may be connected with legitimate operations and has an economic impact.

=== Cybercrime ===
Cybercrime has grown significantly as a category of organised crime in Australia. According to the Australian Signals Directorate's ACSC Annual Cyber Threat Report 2024–25, the Australian Cyber Security Centre received over 84,700 cybercrime reports during the 2024–25 financial year — approximately one every six minutes — with the average financial impact per cybercrime report for businesses reaching $80,850, an increase of 50% from the prior year. The Australian Competition and Consumer Commission's National Anti-Scam Centre reported total scam losses of $2.18 billion across all reporting agencies in calendar year 2025, with investment scams accounting for $837.7 million of that figure. Key figures of cybercrime at a glance show $2.18 billions of total reported scam loses in Australia in 2025; 84700+ cybercrime reports received by ACSC between 2024-2025; $80,250 average cost per cybercrime for Australian businesses (up by 50%) and a total of 481,253 scam reports across all agencies in 2025.

==== Copyright infringement ====
In the 2007 Australian federal budget, the AFP was provided with additional funding of $8.3m over two years to strengthen its capability to pursue serious and complex IP crime, particularly where organised or transnational criminal elements are involved (AGD 2007). AFACT has reported that links between organised crime and film piracy were first uncovered following a raid on Malaysia-linked pirates in Sydney in 2002. The Australian Subscription Television and Radio Association (ASTRA) referred to several cases involving pirates who were involved in other criminal activity such as prostitution and drugs possession. Status Investigations and Security Pty Ltd referred to a matter that indicated organised links between copyright offences and importation of prohibited weapons. Trademark Investigation Services (TMIS) argued that 'Recent Police cases suggest such links'. They pointed out that 'To examine high quality goods and packaging it is obvious that a single person could not set up the productions, packaging, export, import, wholesale, etc. alone. There is a network or chain where each party along the way is a part of the ongoing conspiracy to manufacture, package and sell the goods for profits they could not otherwise make from those goods if they were plain, unbranded goods.'

==== Cyberwarfare ====
The most common form of cyberwarfare perpetrated by online criminal organisations is the Denial-of-service attack. Hacking, denial of service, access to and leaking of government (e.g. military) documentation have all been highlighted as key concerns for Australia.

=== White-collar crime and corruption ===
==== Public sector (political corruption) ====
- Royal Commission on the activities of the Federated Ship Painters and Dockers Union ("Costigan Royal Commission") (1980–1984), investigated organised crime influences and drug trafficking in a large trade union;
- Royal Commission of Inquiry into Drug Trafficking ("Stewart Royal Commission"), (1981–1983);
- Royal Commission into Drug Trafficking ("Woodward Royal Commission"), (1977–1980) investigated drug trafficking in New South Wales, especially links between the Mafia and New South Wales Police and the disappearance of Donald Mackay;
- Royal Commission into the Building and Construction Industry ("Cole Royal Commission"), (2001–2003), investigated the conduct of industrial relations within the building industry;
- Inquiry into certain Australian companies in relation to the UN Oil-For-Food Programme ("Cole Inquiry"), (2005–2006), investigation into the alleged participation of the AWB into the Oil for Food program;
- Royal Commission into Commercial Activities of Government and Other Matters ("WA Inc Royal Commission") (1990–1992) investigated the collapse of Bond Corporation, Rothwells, Bell Group, and other large businesses in Western Australia as well as government commercial enterprises.

==== Private sector (corporate crime) ====
- The Cole Commission;
- Royal Commission into HIH Insurance (2001–2003), investigated the collapse of HIH Insurance, then Australia's second-largest insurance company;
- Royal Commission of Inquiry in respect of certain matters relating to allegations of organised crime in clubs ("Moffitt Royal Commission") (1973–74) investigated organised crime in New South Wales.

=== Drug trafficking ===
==== Clandestine chemistry ====
Criminal organisations may generate significant income through the manufacture and trafficking of illicit drugs and their precursor chemicals. Increased involvement has resulted in larger and more sophisticated clandestine laboratories being detected in Australia. In 2008–09, a record 449 clandestine laboratories were detected in Australia (a 26 per cent increase from 2007–08). 67.7 per cent of clandestine laboratories continue to be detected in residential locations. Over two tonnes of precursor chemicals for the production of meth/amphetamines were detected at the Australian border in 2008–09, nearly double the weight detected in 2007–08. In 2008–09, clandestine laboratory detections increased across most jurisdictions, the largest occurring in Western Australia, which increased from 30 laboratories in 2007–08 to 78 in 2008–09, an increase of 160 per cent. In the context of the Australian Illicit Drug Report, a clandestine laboratory is any concealed place where chemicals are used to produce illicit drugs. Such laboratories range from crude, makeshift operations using simple processes to highly sophisticated operations using technically advanced facilities. They can be located virtually anywhere—in private residences, motel and hotel rooms, apartments, horse trailers, houseboats, boats, vehicles, buses, trucks, campgrounds and commercial establishments—and are usually very portable. Some clandestine laboratories use very simple processes such as extracting cannabis oil from plants using solvents; others use complex processes involving a number of chemicals and a range of equipment to manufacture drugs such as methylamphetamine and ecstasy. Clan labs are usually discovered after they have exploded.

Mainly clan labs manufacture methylamphetamine but other drugs produced in Australia and reported on in connection with clandestine laboratories are ecstasy, methcathinone, cannabis oil, 'crack' cocaine, pethidine and gamma-hydroxybutyrate (GHB, or fantasy). Because of the increase in the number of clandestine laboratories detected in Australia, it was determined that there was a need for better exchange of information between the various jurisdictions. As a result, in August 1997 the first Chemical Diversion Conference was held at the Australian Bureau of Criminal Intelligence; among other things, a categorisation of the various types of clandestine laboratories was developed. Initially there were three categories but a fourth has since been added. The categories are as follows:

- Category A—active (chemicals and equipment in use);
- Category B—stored/used (equipment or chemicals);
- Category C—stored/unused (equipment or chemicals);
- Category D—used site/evidence or admissions of a prior laboratory (ABCI 1998).

Clan lab activity may include but are not limited to strong unusual odours, traffic at extremely late hours, covered windows and reinforced doors, exhaust fans and pipes on windows, high security measures such as bars on windows and an accumulation of chemical containers and waste. On 13 April 2011 the Minister for Home Affairs and Justice launched the Clandestine Drug Laboratory Remediation Guidelines. These Guidelines provide a framework for regulatory authorities and environmental specialists to investigate and remediate sites that may have been contaminated due to being used as clandestine drug laboratories. Clan labs produce substances that are toxic, corrosive, explosive and carcinogenic. They can pose a significant threat to the health and safety of officers, the general public and the environment and hazards include:

- flammable and/or explosive atmosphere;
- acutely toxic atmospheres;
- leaking or damaged compressed gas cylinders;
- clan labs located in confined spaces;
- water reactive and spontaneous explosive chemicals;
- damaged and leaking chemical containers;
- electrical hazards and sources of ignition;
- reactions – in progress, hot, under pressure;
- incompatible chemical reactions; and,
- bombs and booby traps.

==== Clan labs in Perth ====
The Police Commissioner Karl O’Callaghan's son was involved in a clan lab explosion in March were a total of 5 people were injured. On 2 June a Gosnells house explodes, resulting in one man in hospital with severe burns. In 2010, 133 clan labs were dismantled. Of the clan labs discovered in 2010, 26 were in the cities of Armadale and Gosnells and the Shire of Serpentine-Jarrahdale. In Western Australia, Gosnells has proved to be the hotspot for drug manufacture, with six clan labs uncovered by police. Five labs were shut down in Armadale. Almost all drug labs were found to manufacture methylamphetamine. The suburbs of Kelmscott, Huntingdale, Bedfordale and Southern River harboured two clan labs each until these were uncovered and shut down by officers. Clan labs have also been detected in Camillo, Maddington, Thornlie, Mundijong, Byford, Brookdale and Karrakup.

==== Heroin ====
- Source countries / production: "three major regions known as the golden triangle (Burma, Laos, Thailand), golden crescent (Afghanistan) and Central and South America. The majority of heroin imported into Australia comes from Burma. However there are suggestions that due to the continuing decline in opium production in South East Asia, traffickers may begin to look to Afghanistan as a source of heroin."
- Community impact: "In 2004, 384,800 people aged 14 years and over reported having used heroin, methadone and/or other opioids in their lifetime, with 56,300 using in the previous 12 months."

==== Cocaine ====
- Source countries / production: "Coca leaf is only grown in three countries for commercial distribution. These countries are Bolivia, Colombia and Peru. Therefore there is no local production of cocaine in Australia. "
- Community impact: "In a 2004 survey, one percent of people aged 14 years and over indicated they had used cocaine in the previous 12 months."

==== Meth/amphetamines (including MDMA) ====
- Source countries / production: "the majority of amphetamines consumed in Australia is produced in this country in clandestine laboratories."
- Community impact: "more than 9% of Australians aged 14 and over indicated they had used amphetamines at some stage in their lifetime and 3% had used amphetamines in the past 12 months. According to the Australian Crime Commission, there is an increase in the number of young recreational drug users smoking crystal methamphetamine. Research also indicated an increase in use of methamphetamine, which occurred around the same time as the heroin shortage in Australia in 2000-01."

==== LSD, psilocybin, and other hallucinogens ====
- Source countries / production: "LSD is not generally produced in Australia and is mainly imported from the United States of America. There are 30 types of hallucinogenic mushrooms growing naturally in this country and there have been seizures of spores from other countries."
- Community impact: "1.2 million people aged 14 years and over indicated they had used hallucinogens in their lifetime, with 116,400 using hallucinogens in the preceding 12 months."

==== Cannabis ====
- Source countries / production: "Cannabis is produced in most areas of Australia with a trend in recent years towards the use of hydroponics. It is now suspected that hydroponics is the most common method of cultivation in the domestic market. Growers believe that hydroponics produce a better yield, reduce the chances of detection and mitigate seasonal climate changes. There is a level of cannabis importation from countries including the Netherlands and United Kingdom.

Organised crime groups, including outlaw motorcycle gangs are involved in the cultivation and distribution of cannabis within Australia. According to the Australian Crime Commission, there has been a noticeable increase in the involvement of Vietnamese crime groups in recent years."

- Community impact: "Cannabis is the most widely used illicit drug in Australia and generally easily available. In a 2004 survey, it was reported that one in three Australians aged 14 years and over had used cannabis at least once in their life, with more than half a million indicating use in the last 12 months."

=== Human trafficking ===
==== Sex trafficking ====
Sex trafficking involves Asian syndicates and European syndicates. It places burdens on the Australian health system.

==== Slavery (labour racketeering ====
- Western Australian Construction and Fabrication Industries
- Western Australian Resources Industry
- Economic impacts

== Legislative responses and policing measures ==
=== Federal ===
- Crimes Act 1914
- Proceeds of Crime Act 2002
- Criminal Code Act 1995

Australia's approach to criminalising money laundering differs from that of many other countries. Division 400 of the Criminal Code Act 1995 (Cth) (the Criminal Code) contains the principal criminal offences of money laundering in Australia. Division 400 was inserted into the Criminal Code by the Proceeds of Crime Act 2002 (Cth) in January 2003. There are currently 19 different offences of money laundering available under the Criminal Code, and these can be classified into two types: those linked to the proceeds of crime (funds generated by an illegal activity) and those linked to the instruments of crime (funds used to conduct an illegal activity). Possessing the proceeds or instruments of crime is a single offence under the Criminal Code. Persons receiving, possessing, concealing, importing into Australia, exporting from Australia, or disposing of the proceeds of crime may be guilty of this offence. Possessing the proceeds of crime attracts a maximum custodial sentence of two years.

The remaining 18 offences of money laundering are those of dealing with the proceeds or instruments of crime. 'Dealing with' the proceeds of crime includes all the actions considered as possession of the proceeds of crime as well as engaging in banking transactions using the illicit funds. These 18 offences are distinguished by the value of the property involved and the intent of the offender. The punishments' severity increases with the value and with the offender's knowledge of the source of the funds. Offences are classified under The Criminal Code according to the value of the funds involved. These are divided into bands of $1,000,000 or more; $100,000 to $999,999; $50,000 to $99,999; $10,000 to $49,999; $1,000 to $9,999; and funds of any value.

- Anti-Terrorism Act 2005 - Schedule 1—Amendments to terrorism offences
- Measures to Combat Serious and Organised Crime Act 2001
- National Crime Authority Act 1984 now Australian Crime Commission Establishment Act 2002
- Crimes Legislation Amendment (Serious and Organised Crime) Bill 2009
- Australian Security Intelligence Organisation Act 1979 (ASIO Act)
- Telecommunications (Interception and Access) Act 1979
- Intelligence Services Act 2001
- Inspector-General of Intelligence and Security Act 1986
- South Australia v Totani (2010) HCA 39
- Project Stop
- Organised Crime in Australia Report, ACC 2011
- Inquiry into the Crimes Legislation Amendment (Serious and Organised Crime) Bill 2009 (PFA, 2009)
- A Collaborative Approach to Fighting Serious Organised Crime in Australia, 2009
- Submission to Parliamentary Joint Committee, Inquiry into The future impact of serious and organised crime on Australian society, ACC 2007

=== State ===
==== South Australia ====
- Statutes Amendment (Anti-Fortification) Act 2003
- Statutes Amendment (Liquor, Gambling and Security Industries) Act 2005
- Statutes Amendment (Power to Bar) Act 2008
- Serious and Organised Crime (Control) Act 2008
- Criminal Law Consolidation Act 1935

==== New South Wales ====
- Crimes (Criminal Organisations Control) Act 2009
- Crimes Amendment (Fraud, Identity and Forgery Offences) Act 2009 (NSW)
- NSW Police: Asian Crime Squad; Drug Squad; Firearms & Organised Crime Squad; Gangs Squad; Middle Eastern Organised Crime Squad; Organised Crime (Targeting) Squad
- Drug Misuse and Trafficking Act 1985 (NSW)

Section 24A states that: (1) A person who has possession of: (a) a precursor, or (b) a drug manufacture apparatus, intended by the person for use in the manufacture or production, by that person or another person, of a prohibited drug is guilty of an offence. A common example of this offence includes being in possession of the chemicals and ingredients required to manufacture a drug.

Offences including possession of precursors and certain apparatus for manufacture or production of prohibited drugs fall under Part 2, Division 2 of the Drug Misuse and Trafficking Act 1985 (NSW). This means that these offences are considered indictable offences, and are heard in the District or Supreme Court. Defences to this offence include but are not limited to duress and necessity. Also, those licensed or authorised under the Poisons and Therapeutic Goods Act 1966 or somebody given authority by the Director General of the Department of Health are exempt from liability. Section 35A of the Drug Misuse and Trafficking Act 1985 (NSW) outlines a further defence: it is legal to possess or manufacture a prohibited substance if the substance is contained in a product where the substance cannot be readily extracted, or in a product not for human consumption, or if the substance is possessed for the purpose of its disposal as waste or its destruction. The maximum penalty for this offence is a fine of $220,000, 10 years imprisonment or both.

==== Western Australia ====
- Criminal Code Act Compilation Act 1913
- Misuse of Drugs Act 1981
- Firearms Act 1973
- Corruption and Crime Commission Act 2003
- Proposed Anti-Association Laws and other Measures
- Criminal Code Amendment (Identity Crime) Bill 2009
- Prohibited Behaviour Orders Regulations 2011
- Telecommunications (Interception) Western Australia Act 1996
- Director of Public Prosecutions (Cth) v Kamal [2011] WASCA 55
- R v Quaid [2009] WASC 202
- Nguyen v State of Western Australia [2009] WASCA 81
- [WA Police]: Serious and Organised Crime Division which includes the Gang Crime Squad; Drug and Firearm Squad; Financial Crime Squad and Proceeds of Crime Squad

==== Queensland ====
- Criminal Code Act 1899
- Criminal Proceeds Confiscation Act 2002
- Police Powers and Responsibilities Act 2000
- Vicious Lawless Association Disestablishment Act 2013
- Tattoo Parlours Act 2013
- Criminal Law (Criminal Organisations Disruption) Amendment Act 2013

==== Victoria ====
Criminal Organisations Control Act 2012 (Vic)

- Crimes (Assumed Identities) Act 2004
- Crimes (Controlled Operations) Act 2004
- Evidence (Witness Identity Protection) Act 2004
- Major Crimes (Investigative Powers) Act 2004
- Surveillance Devices (Amendment) Act 2004
- Mokbel v R [2011] VSCA 106
- Major Crime (Investigative Powers) Act 2004 (No 9), Re [2007] VSC 128
- Poynder v Kent; Sodomacco v O'Bryan [2008] VSCA 245

==== Tasmania ====
- Police Offences Amendment Act 2007

==== Northern Territory ====
- Justice Legislation (Group Criminal Activities) Act 2006
- Serious Crime Control Act 2009

==== Australian Capital Territory ====
- Crimes (Controlled Operations) Act 2008
- Crimes (Assumed Identities) Act 2009

=== International and other jurisdictions ===
Convention against Transnational Organized Crime (the 'Palermo Convention') including the Protocol to Prevent, Suppress and Punish Trafficking in Persons, especially Women and Children and Protocol against the Smuggling of Migrants by Land, Sea and Air - 2000 (UN)

- Article 5 – Criminalization of participation in an organized criminal group.
- 6 – Criminalization of the laundering of proceeds of crime;
- 8 – Criminalization of corruption;
- 23 – Criminalization of obstruction of justice;
- 3 and 5 of the Protocol on Trafficking in Persons; and,
- 3, 5 and 6 of the Protocol Against Smuggling of Migrants

Organized Crime Control Act - 1970 (US)

Title 21 of the United States Code - 1970 (US) Ch. 12 Sub. 1 and 2, particularly § 848. Continuing criminal enterprise See Continuing Criminal Enterprise

Racketeer Influenced and Corrupt Organizations Act (the 'RICO Act') - 1970 (US)

- Offences: § 1962. Prohibited activities
- Penalties: § 1963. Criminal penalties

Serious Organised Crime and Police Act 2005 - (UK)

Criminal Code (Canada), RSC 1985, c C-46.

== Media representation and references in popular culture ==
=== TV drama ===
The topic has been widely covered in books and the news media and has also been the subject of several major Australian films and TV drama series including the ABC-TV series Phoenix, Janus and Blue Murder and, more recently, the popular Nine Network miniseries Underbelly.

=== News media ===
- Counterfeit Drugs | Hungry Beast, ABC
- MDMA | Hungry Beast, ABC
- Cops Against Drug Laws | Hungry Beast, ABC
- The Gang of 49 | Hungry Beast, ABC
- Crime Incorporated | Four Corners, ABC
- Paul Wilson, Professor of Criminology on Unconstitutional Anti-Association Bikie Laws | ABC
- Mr Sin, The Abe Saffron Story | ABC
- Man charged and 11kg ICE seized in joint operation | NSW Police
- Police dismantle drug importation syndicate | NSW Police
- Police smash interstate heroin ring | NSW Police
- Underbelly | Nine Australia
- Middle Eastern Organised Crime Squad Modified Car Crackdown hoons | 7 Network
- Ride of Defiance | Ten News
- Lawler, J. (2010) The Fifth Estate Goes Virtual
- Rise of Middle Eastern Crime in Australia
- "History of Gangs in Australia". ABC, Late night live.

=== Print media ===
- Butler, Mark "Neighbours fear gang violence will spiral into gun battles as secret police report exposes fears of open warfare"
- Silvester, John (24 September 2006). "Outlaw gangs make killing". The Age.
- Guide to Sydney Crime

== See also ==
- Gangs in Australia
- List of criminal enterprises, gangs, and syndicates

== Books ==
- Sher, Julian; Marsden, William (2006). Angels of Death: Inside the Bikers' Empire of Crime. Toronto: Alfred Knopf Canada. ISBN 9780307370327.
