= Kath Pettingill =

Australian criminal (1935–2026)

- Born: 27 March 1935
- Died: 1 August 2026 (aged 91); Venus Bay, Victoria, Australia
- Other name: Granny Evil
- Occupation: Brothel owner
- Children: 10, including Dennis Allen and Victor Peirce
- Conviction: Drug trafficking

Kathleen Pettingill (27 March 1935 – 1 August 2026) was an Australian gangster and brothel owner who was the matriarch of the Melbourne-based Pettingill crime family.

== Life ==
Pettingill was associated with the criminal underworld in Melbourne, from the 1970s to the 2000s. She first worked in a bar, and having herself been a prostitute, she went on to run brothels. She lived with her children in the Richmond area of Melbourne, and a number of her sons were sent to the Turana Boys' Home.

She had a glass eye in place of the one she lost after being shot in 1978 by Kim Nelson and Keryn Thompson. The bullet passed through a closed door at the Collingwood Housing Commission of Victoria flats as she and her son, Dennis Allen, attempted to repay a $300 debt on behalf of her daughter, Vicky Brooks.

== Family ==
Pettingill had ten children by three fathers:

With Dennis Ryan:

- Dennis Bruce Allen (1951–1987) – a drug dealer, jailed for rape in 1973 and died in 1987 of a heart attack while in custody awaiting trial for murder.
- Peter Allen (born 1953) – convicted of armed robbery, who was once Victoria's most dangerous man and spent 28 years in jail.

With William George "Billy" Peirce (died 1968):

- Vicki or Vicky Brooks (born 1954; née Pettingill) – gave evidence against the family in the Walsh Street trial and subsequently went into witness protection.
- "Shelley" (born 1956) – real name unknown. Placed for adoption and reestablished contact with Pettingill in 1989.
- "Stephen" (born 1957) – real name unknown. Placed for adoption and reestablished contact with Pettingill in 1989.
- Victor George Peirce (1958–2002) – acquitted of the 1988 Walsh Street police shootings, was killed in 2002.
- Lex Peirce (born 1960) – has a minor criminal record.
- "David" (born 1961) – real name unknown. Placed for adoption and whereabouts currently unknown.

With Jimmy Pettingill (died 1972):

- Jamie Pettingill (1963–1985) – died of a heroin overdose aged 21.
- Trevor Pettingill (born 1965) – acquitted of the 1988 Walsh Street police shootings, has multiple convictions for firearms and drug-related offences, served several jail terms. Described as a "career criminal".

== Death ==
Pettingill died from complications of dementia on 1 August 2026, at the age of 91.

== In popular culture ==
A biography of her life, The Matriarch: The Kathy Pettingill Story, was written by Adrian Tame and published in 1996. In 2007, Pettingill was living in Venus Bay, Gippsland, Victoria.

In the 2011 miniseries Killing Time, Pettingill is a major character, played by Kris McQuade.

Fictionalised versions of Pettingill, as the character Janine "Smurf" Cody, have appeared in both the 2010 Australian film Animal Kingdom portrayed by Jacki Weaver. Weaver was nominated for an Academy Award in the Best Supporting Actress category for her performance. In the 2016 TNT television show of the same name, Pettingill was portrayed by Ellen Barkinas "Smurf".
