= Richard Cawthorne =

Australian actor

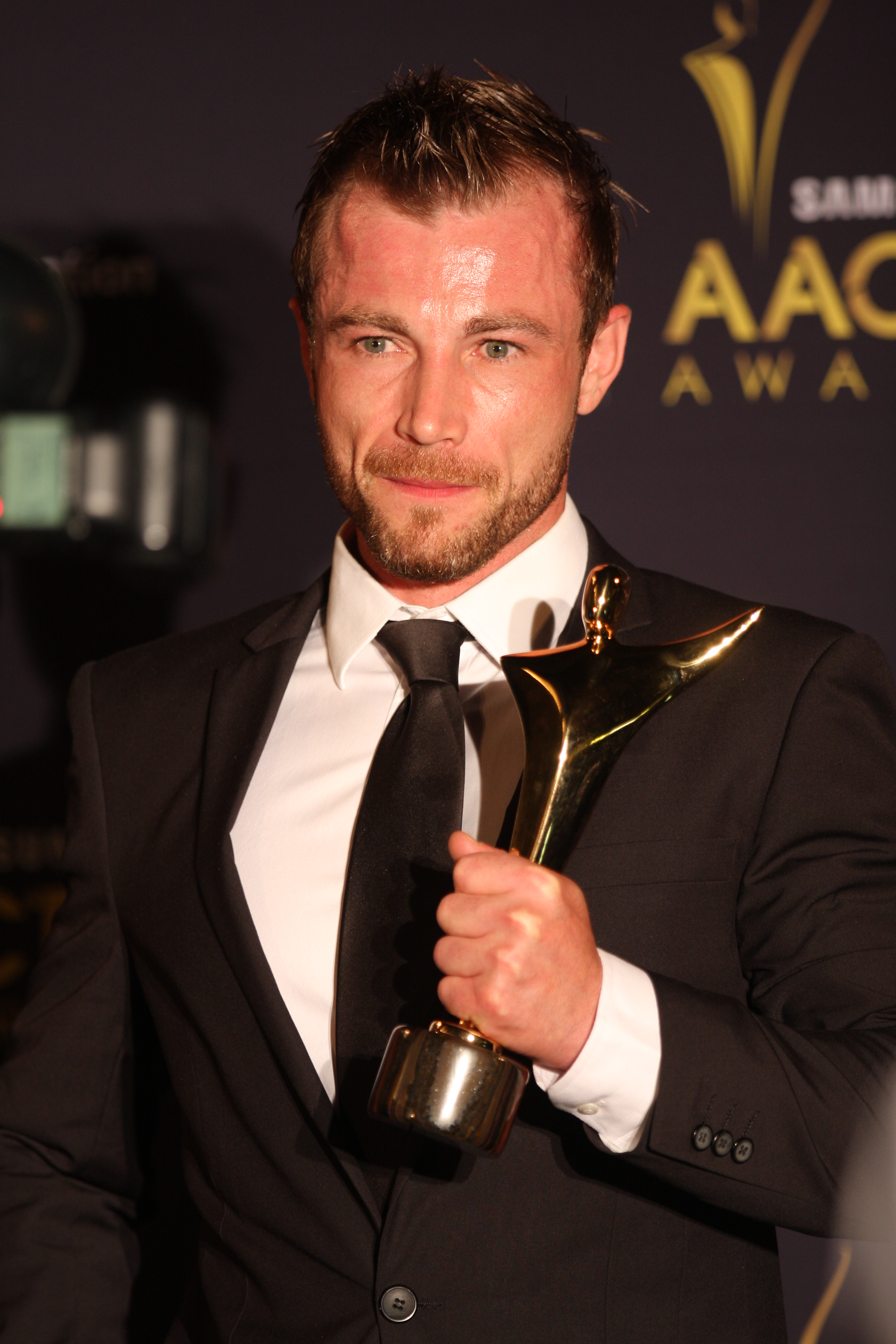
- Cawthorne at the AACTA Awards, Sydney Opera House in 2012
- Born: 3 December 1976 (age 49); Hong Kong
- Occupation: Actor
- Years active: 2000–present

Richard Seymour Cawthorne (born 3 December 1976) is an Australian actor of theatre, film and television.

== Career ==
Cawthorne has appeared in many film and television productions. His credits include Catching Milat, Fat Tony & Co, Bikie Wars: Brothers in Arms, The Straits, East West 101, Rush, Noise, Neighbours, Underbelly: Squizzy, Wolf Creek and Killing Time, for which he won the 2012 Australian Academy of Cinema and Television Arts (AACTA). Award for Best Supporting Actor in a Television Drama. In 2015, Richard was appointed Ambassador to the National Theatre in Melbourne.

== Personal life ==
Cawthorne was born in Hong Kong in 1976, the youngest of two. His mother, Zelda, was a journalist for the South China Morning Post, and his father, Russell, was a Marketing Executive for the Hong Kong–based film company, Golden Harvest Studios.

Cawthorne is a first cousin of Australian Labor Minister Martin Pakula.

== Filmography ==
=== Film ===
Year	Title	Role	Notes
2003	Razor Eaters	Zach	
2007	Noise	Kermond	
2012	10 Terrorists	Judge MI6	
2016	The Death and Life of Otto Bloom	Duane Renaud	
2016	Found	Carson	Short film
2018	Upgrade	Serk	
2019	The Last Full Measure	Young Holt	

=== Television ===
Year	Title	Role	Notes
2000	Eugénie Sandler P.I.	Sammy	3 episodes
2000–2003	Stingers	Mick Prentice, Mark "Weasel" Burridge	2 episodes
2000	Halifax f.p.	Gary Groom	TV movie
2001–2006	Blue Heelers	Bradley Eckhardt, Scott Dixon, Bryan McKean	5 episodes
2005	Neighbours	Reuben Hausman	11 episodes
2005	The Glenmore Job	Officer Danoz	TV movie
2006	Nightmares and Dreamscapes: From the Stories of Stephen King	Hot Rod Driver	TV movie
2009–2011	Rush	Novak, Joe Hadden	4 episodes
2008	Canal Road	Greg Manor	Episode #1.1
2008	East of Everything	Driver	Episode: "Save Me Some Scones"
2009	City Homicide	Harry Bolingbroke	Episode: "Hot House"
2010	The Pacific	Perle	
2011	East West 101	Sterling	Episode: "Behold a Pale Horse"
2011	Killing Time	Dennis Allen	4 episodes
2012	Australia on Trial - The Eureka 13	James Harris	
2012	Australia on Trial - Massacre at Myall Creek	Russell	
2012	Bikie Wars: Brothers in Arms	Foggy	6 episodes
2013	Underbelly: Squizzy	Long Harry' Slater	4 episodes
2014	Fat Tony & Co	Jarrod Ragg	9 episodes
2015	Catching Milat	Detective Paul Gordon	2 episodes
2016	Jack Irish	Fraser Boyd	4 episodes
2016	Wolf Creek	Kane Jurkewitz	2 episodes
2017	The Doctor Blake Mysteries	Angus Reed	Episodes: "All She Leaves Behind"
2019	Harrow	Paul Haberecht	2 Episodes

== Awards and nominations ==
Year	Group	Award	Film/Show	Result
2012	AACTA Awards	Best Guest or Supporting Actor in a Television Drama	Killing Time	Won
2005	Shriekfest Film Festival	Best Actor	Razor Eaters	Won.
