= Animal Kingdom (film) =

2010 Australian film by David Michôd

- Theatrical release poster
- Directed by: David Michôd
- Written by: David Michôd
- Produced by: Liz Watts
- Starring: Ben Mendelsohn; Joel Edgerton; Guy Pearce; Luke Ford; Jacki Weaver; Sullivan Stapleton; James Frecheville
- Cinematography: Adam Arkapaw
- Edited by: Luke Doolan
- Music by: Antony Partos
- Production companies: Screen Australia; Porchlight Films; Film Victoria; Screen NSW; Fulcrum Media Finance; Showtime Australia; Blue-Tongue Films
- Distributed by: Madman Entertainment
- Release dates: 22 January 2010 (Sundance); 3 June 2010 (Australia)
- Running time: 113 minutes
- Country: Australia
- Language: English
- Budget: $5 million
- Box office: $7.2 million

Animal Kingdom is a 2010 Australian crime drama film written and directed by David Michôd in his feature directorial debut. It stars Ben Mendelsohn, Joel Edgerton, Guy Pearce, James Frecheville, Luke Ford, Jacki Weaver, and Sullivan Stapleton.

The screenplay was inspired by several crimes allegedly committed by the Pettingill family of Melbourne, particularly one involving brothers Trevor Pettingill and Victor Peirce, and two other men, Anthony Leigh Farrell and Peter David McEvoy, all of whom were acquitted in 1988 of murdering two police officers in the Walsh Street police shootings.

Animal Kingdom premiered at the Sundance Film Festival on 22 January 2010, where it won the World Cinema Jury Prize. The film was theatrically released on 3 June 2010 to highly positive reviews, with Mendelsohn and Weaver earning widespread acclaim for their performances. Weaver won the National Board of Review Award for Best Supporting Actress and was nominated for the Academy Award for Best Supporting Actress at the 83rd Academy Awards.

== Plot ==
After his mother overdoses, 18-year-old Joshua "J" Cody asks his estranged grandmother, Janine "Smurf" Cody, for help, and she invites him to move in with her. Smurf is the affectionate matriarch of a Melbourne crime family that uses her home as a base. Her home is also being watched by cops who are looking for her oldest son, Andrew "Pope" Cody, who is in hiding. The volatile middle brother, Craig, deals drugs successfully enough to have bought the house for his mother. The youngest brother, Darren, follows the lead of his siblings, while family friend "Baz" leads the gang, which specialises in armed robbery.

J is quickly exposed to the criminal underworld. Craig takes J along to meet with a crooked cop, from the drug squad, who tells Craig that renegade cops on the armed-robbery squad are on the lookout for all of them. At a traffic light, Craig is verbally abused by the passenger of a passing car. Craig passes J a handgun before pursuing. As the car stops, two men exit and begin to threaten Craig. J steps out and points the pistol at the two men, who flee as Craig looks on. J, exhilarated, passes the gun back to Craig who asks J if he enjoyed himself.

Later, Baz goes to meet Pope at a shopping centre, where they discuss quitting crime and going straight. As Baz gets in his car to leave, police approach, falsely claim he has a gun, and shoot him dead. Angry and distraught, Pope and Craig want revenge and ask J to steal a Commodore and take it to Darren's place. The car is then parked after 2:00 am in the middle of the street as a lure. Two policemen are called to the scene, where they are ambushed and shot dead by Pope and Craig. The next day, Pope, Darren, and J are taken in for questioning, where J meets Detective Senior Sergeant Nathan Leckie, who also leads the armed-robbery squad. Leckie, one of the few non-corrupt police officers, recognises J's predicament and begins to lean on him. The three are later released from custody, and J returns with his girlfriend, Nicky, to her parents' home.

Craig, who has avoided being picked up by the police, meets Pope, Darren, and Smurf at a restaurant, where they realise J is the weak link. After Smurf suggests Craig give himself up for questioning, he panics and goes to visit a friend in rural Bendigo. Craig learns that the house is already being monitored, and as the police arrive he tries to flee through a field but is gunned down.

Pope and Darren take J to meet their solicitor, Ezra. He coaches J to not tell the police anything and pressures him to break up with Nicky, which J does. Leckie takes J into custody again, where he proposes that J be moved to witness protection, but J turns down the offer. Meanwhile, Nicky, unsure what to do, shows up at Smurf's home, looking for J. Pope gives her heroin, questions her, then suffocates her. When J returns to Smurf's house the next morning he discovers Nicky's bracelet outside the house. He calls Nicky's phone and hearing it ring from the backyard, flees to Nicky's parents' house. Pope gets Nicky's address from Darren and arrives in time to intercept J. J flees on foot and is taken into a safe house. With Craig and Baz dead, Pope and Darren imprisoned, and J potentially the star witness for the prosecution, Smurf decides, "J needs to go". Smurf uses her connections to procure J's address and persuades the corrupt cop to help her. Police from the drug squad then raid the safe house. J jumps a fence and returns to Smurf's house, saying he wishes to help free Pope and Darren from jail. To do this, the family's barrister then coaches J's answers.

After J gives his coached testimony, he sits in a police transport staring blankly. A police officer draws his handgun and points it at J, who now resigned to his place in the world, gives no reaction. Leckie sees J before his departure from the safe hotel and asks him if he's "worked out where he fits" (a reference to Leckie's animal-kingdom metaphor for J's predicament). Pope, Darren, and Smurf celebrate with champagne while being interviewed after their controversial acquittal. Smurf later sees Leckie in the supermarket and taunts him. Later, J returns to Smurf's home, asking to stay before going to his room. Pope enters and begins to talk to him but is cut off when J shoots him in the head. In the final scene, J returns to the living room and embraces a now-speechless Smurf.

== Cast ==
- James Frecheville as Joshua 'J' Daniel Cody, Smurf's grandson and the nephew of Pope, Craig and Darren. He becomes friends with Craig and Darren, but hates Pope.
- Ben Mendelsohn as Andrew 'Pope' Cody, the psychopathic eldest brother and an armed robber on the run from the police. His best friend and partner-in-crime is Baz.
- Guy Pearce as Detective Nathan Leckie, one of the few good police officers in Melbourne. He tries to convince J not to become a criminal.
- Jacki Weaver as Janine 'Smurf' Cody, the matriarch of the family, Pope, Darren and Craig's mother, and J's grandmother.
- Joel Edgerton as Barry 'Baz' Brown, Pope's best friend and partner-in-crime. He and his wife Cathy are close friends of the Cody family.
- Sullivan Stapleton as Craig Cody, the middle brother and a successful drug dealer. He and Darren try to protect J from 'Pope', who hates him.
- Luke Ford as Darren Cody, the youngest of the brothers. He is only a few years older than J, and the two were best friends as children. He is the first of the brothers to warm up to J
- Laura Wheelwright as Nicole 'Nicky' Henry, J's girlfriend.
- Dan Wyllie as Ezra White, the family's solicitor who hates Leckie. The character Ezra White (also played by Wyllie) originally appeared as the central character in Michod's 2006 short drama film Ezra White, LL.B.
- Anthony Hayes as Detective Justin Norris, Leckie's partner who helps J with his situation.
- Mirrah Foulkes as Catherine 'Cathy' Brown, Baz's wife.
- Justin Rosniak as Detective Randall Roache
- Susan Prior as Alicia Henry
- Clayton Jacobson as Gus Emery
- Anna Lise Phillips as Justine Hopper
- Kieran Darcy-Smith as John Harrop
- Jacqueline Brennan as Sandra Leckie
- Andrew O'Keefe as himself (Voice only) (uncredited) at the time he was the host of the Australian original version of Deal or no Deal

== Production ==
The film is loosely inspired by the real life Pettingill family and by the Walsh Street police shootings that occurred in Melbourne in 1988. Director David Michôd was interested in the underworld in Melbourne and wrote a script titled J in December 2000. Working at Screen NSW Script Development, fellow producer Liz Watts saw potential in the script. Watts said, "It needed more characterisation and structure, which he kind of agreed with. It was important to me that he recognise that there was still work to be done on it." Michôd then did a number of draft scripts, gaining feedback from many different people in the film industry. Liz Watts then became a producer on the film with a budget of A$5 million from Screen Australia, Film Victoria, Screen NSW and Showtime Australia. The final version of Animal Kingdom did not contain any of the dialogue featured in Michôd's script for J.

Animal Kingdom was filmed in the Melbourne metropolitan area. The outside funeral scene was filmed in Ivanhoe East, Victoria.

== Soundtrack ==
The film's original score was composed by Antony Partos with additional music composed by Sam Petty and David McCormack. It was released on 16 August 2010.

No.	Title	Length
1.	"Animal Kingdom"	2:36
2.	"This Is Where I Was" (composed by Sam Petty)	1:43
3.	"Barry Brown"	2:07
4.	"Prahran"	2:38
5.	"Ivanhoe"	4:09
6.	"Hawthorn" (composed by Sam Petty)	3:48
7.	"Black Pools"	1:34
8.	"Fairfield"	2:03
9.	"Craig Cody"	3:00
10.	"Janine's Little Boy"	2:46
11.	"Nicky Henry"	2:33
12.	"Descent" (composed by Antony Partos and David McCormack)	5:11
13.	"Then and Now"	2:31
14.	"Janine Cody"	3:52
15.	"Melbourne" (composed by Antony Partos and Sam Petty)	3:11
16.	"Joshua Cody"	4:03
17.	"End" (composed by Jona Ma)	2:21
Total length:		50:07

== Release ==
Animal Kingdom premiered at the 26th Sundance Film Festival on 22 January 2010. It later opened in Australia on 3 June 2010.

Internationally, the film has been sold to the United Kingdom, Italy, France, Canada and Eastern Europe. It was released in August 2010 in the United States and Latin America by Sony Pictures Classics, grossing a total of $1,030,288 in North America. It was released in Australia on DVD and Blu-ray Disc formats on 13 October 2010. The Blu-ray release available from Madman is region-free.

== Reception ==
=== Box office ===
Animal Kingdom grossed $5,000,018 in Australia, and $2,209,894 elsewhere for a worldwide total of $7,209,912.

=== Critical response ===
Review aggregator Rotten Tomatoes gave the movie a score of 96%, based on 163 reviews, and an average rating of 8.00/10. The website's critical consensus states: "With confident pacing, a smart script, and a top-notch cast, Animal Kingdom represents the best the Australian film industry has to offer." On Metacritic, the film has a weighted average score of 83 out of 100, based on 33 reviews, indicating "universal acclaim".

David Stratton said on At the Movies:

It's so lovely to see a really good Australian film. And we're not admiring this because it's an Australian film, because it's a very good film... The revelation here is Jacki Weaver, always a fine actor but seldom revealing the depths of character she does here. All the performances are superb, down to the small parts —like Dan Wyllie as the family's lawyer and Anna Lisa Phillips [sic] as Josh's barrister.

Stratton and co-host Margaret Pomeranz both gave the film four and a half stars. Quentin Tarantino listed Animal Kingdom as his third favourite film of 2010, behind Toy Story 3 and The Social Network. In 2015, the film was named as one of the top 50 films of the decade so far by The Guardian.

=== Accolades ===
Animal Kingdom received 18 nominations for the 2010 Australian Film Institute Awards, across all major feature film categories – a record achievement. On 11 December 2010, Animal Kingdom won a record 10 awards. The film received several other film awards to Jacki Weaver, who was nominated for the Golden Globe Award for Best Supporting Actress – Motion Picture for the 68th Golden Globe Awards. Weaver was also nominated for the Academy Award for Best Supporting Actress at the 83rd Academy Awards.

It was named one of the Top Independent Films of 2010 at the National Board of Review Awards.

Award	Date of ceremony	Category	Recipients	Result
Academy Awards	27 February 2011	Best Supporting Actress	Jacki Weaver	Nominated
AACTA Awards (53rd Australian Film Institute Awards)	11 December 2010	Best Film		Won
AACTA Awards (53rd Australian Film Institute Awards)	11 December 2010	Best Direction	David Michôd	Won
AACTA Awards (53rd Australian Film Institute Awards)	11 December 2010	Best Original Screenplay	David Michôd	Won
AACTA Awards (53rd Australian Film Institute Awards)	11 December 2010	Best Actor	Ben Mendelsohn	Won
AACTA Awards (53rd Australian Film Institute Awards)	11 December 2010	Best Actor	James Frecheville	Nominated
AACTA Awards (53rd Australian Film Institute Awards)	11 December 2010	Best Actress	Jacki Weaver	Won
AACTA Awards (53rd Australian Film Institute Awards)	11 December 2010	Best Supporting Actor	Joel Edgerton	Won
AACTA Awards (53rd Australian Film Institute Awards)	11 December 2010	Best Supporting Actor	Guy Pearce	Nominated
AACTA Awards (53rd Australian Film Institute Awards)	11 December 2010	Best Supporting Actor	Sullivan Stapleton	Nominated
AACTA Awards (53rd Australian Film Institute Awards)	11 December 2010	Best Supporting Actress	Laura Wheelwright	Nominated
AACTA Awards (53rd Australian Film Institute Awards)	11 December 2010	Best Young Actor	James Frecheville	Nominated
AACTA Awards (53rd Australian Film Institute Awards)	11 December 2010	Best Cinematography	Adam Arkapaw	Nominated
AACTA Awards (53rd Australian Film Institute Awards)	11 December 2010	Best Editing	Luke Doolan	Won
AACTA Awards (53rd Australian Film Institute Awards)	11 December 2010	Reader's Choice		Won
Australian Film Institute Members Awards	11 December 2010	Best Film		Won
Australian Film Institute Members Awards	11 December 2010	Best Cinematography	Adam Arkapaw	Nominated
Australian Film Institute Members Awards	11 December 2010	Best Sound	Sam Petty, Rob Mackenzie, Philippe Decrausaz, Leah Katz, Brooke Trezise and Richard Pain	Nominated
Australian Film Institute Members Awards	11 December 2010	Best Score	Antony Partos and Sam Petty	Won
Australian Film Institute Members Awards	11 December 2010	Best Production Design	Jo Ford	Nominated
Australian Film Institute Members Awards	11 December 2010	Best Costume Design	Cappi Ireland	Nominated
Chicago Film Critics Association Awards	20 December 2010	Best Supporting Actress	Jacki Weaver	Nominated
Chicago Film Critics Association Awards	20 December 2010	Most Promising Filmmaker	David Michôd	Nominated
Golden Globe Awards	16 January 2011	Best Supporting Actress	Jacki Weaver	Nominated
Inside Film Awards	14 November 2010	Best Actor	Ben Mendelsohn	Won
Inside Film Awards	14 November 2010	Best Director	David Michôd	Won
Inside Film Awards	14 November 2010	Best Actress	Jacki Weaver	Nominated
Inside Film Awards	14 November 2010	Best Editing	Luke Doolan	Nominated
Inside Film Awards	14 November 2010	Best Film		Nominated
Inside Film Awards	14 November 2010	Best Screenplay	David Michôd	Nominated
Inside Film Awards	14 November 2010	Best Sound	Robert Mackenzie, Philippe Decrausaz and Sam Petty	Nominated
Las Vegas Film Critics Society Awards	16 December 2010	Best Supporting Actress	Jacki Weaver	Nominated
Los Angeles Film Critics Association Awards	12 December 2010	Best Supporting Actress	Jacki Weaver	Won
National Board of Review Awards	2 December 2010	Best Supporting Actress	Jacki Weaver	Won
Online Film Critics Society Awards	3 January 2011	Best Supporting Actress	Jacki Weaver	Nominated
San Diego Film Critics Society Awards	14 December 2010	Best Supporting Actress	Jacki Weaver	Nominated
Satellite Awards	19 December 2010	Best Supporting Actress	Jacki Weaver	Won
Satellite Awards	19 December 2010	Best Film		Nominated
Satellite Awards	19 December 2010	Best Director	David Michôd	Nominated
Saturn Award	23 June 2011	Best Supporting Actress	Jacki Weaver	Nominated
Sundance Film Festival	30 January 2010	World Cinema Jury Prize: Dramatic		Won
Washington D.C. Area Film Critics Association Awards	6 December 2010	Best Supporting Actress	Jacki Weaver	Nominated

== Adaptations ==
=== Literature ===
Stephen Sewell's novel, Animal Kingdom, A Crime Story (2010), is based on the film.

=== Television ===
The American cable network TNT developed an eponymous TV series inspired by the film, with John Wells as a producer, starring Ellen Barkin, Scott Speedman, Shawn Hatosy, Ben Robson, Jake Weary, Finn Cole, Daniella Alonso, and Molly Gordon.

== See also ==
- Cinema of Australia
- Ezra White, LL.B.

Awards
Preceded by The Maid	Sundance Grand Jury Prize: World Cinema Dramatic; 2010	Succeeded by Happy, Happy
