= Drug Lords =

- Genre: Documentary
- Starring: Quinn Dalton; Jordan Lawson; Razor Rocco Rizzotti
- Country of origin: United States
- Original language: English
- No. of seasons: 2
- No. of episodes: 8

Production
- Executive producer: Mike Welsh
- Running time: 42-47 min.

Original release
- Network: Netflix
- Release: January 19 – July 10, 2018

Drug Lords is a 2018 American docu-series exploring real-life drug-dealing cartels and kingpins such as Pablo Escobar, El Chapo, the Cali Cartel, Frank Lucas and the Pettingill family.

== Premise ==
Drug Lords explores real-life drug-dealing cartels and kingpins such as Pablo Escobar, El Chapo, the Cali Cartel, Frank Lucas and the Pettingill Clan by interviews from officers, gang members and journalists as well as dramatized re-enactments of certain events.

== Cast ==
- Justin van Dijk
- Quinn Dalton
- Jordan Lawson
- Razor Rocco Rizzotti
- Winter Dunn

== Episodes ==
Season	Episodes	Originally released
1	4	January 19, 2018
2	4	July 10, 2018

=== Season 1 (2018) ===
No. overall	No. in season	Title	Original release date
1	1	"Pablo Escobar"	January 19, 2018
Colombian drug lord Pablo Escobar leads a horrific war against his own country until a team of politicians and police end his reign of terror.
2	2	"The Cali Cartel"	January 19, 2018
Gilberto and Miguel Rodríguez Orejuela use violence and guile to turn the Cali Cartel into a $7 billion-per-year criminal operation.
3	3	"Frank Lucas & The Country Boys: Heroin Kings of New York"	January 19, 2018
Frank Lucas does whatever it takes to become – and remain – the heroin king of New York. Meanwhile, three dedicated cops vow to bring him down.
4	4	"The Pettingill Clan: Australia’s Heroin Dynasty"	January 19, 2018
A mother and her sadistic boys rule the Australian underworld until the eldest son's addiction hastens the family's downfall.

=== Season 2 (2018) ===
No. overall	No. in season	Title	Original release date
5	1	"El Chapo"	July 10, 2018
After idolizing drug lords as a child, Joaquín "El Chapo" Guzmán becomes one of history's most notorious kingpins, known for his audacious escapes.
6	2	"Jemeker Thompson: Crack Queen of L.A"	July 10, 2018
Once the undisputed crack queen of LA, Jemeker Thompson speaks about her unorthodox reign and how her maternal instinct led to her downfall.
7	3	"Christopher Coke: Jamaica’s Narco Prince"	July 10, 2018
Driven by an all-consuming desire for power, Jamaica's Christopher Coke considers himself a modern-day Robin Hood -- until authorities take him down.
8	4	"Klaas Bruinsma: Europe’s Hash King"	July 10, 2018
Thought by many to be a pushover due to his boyish looks and wealthy upbringing, Klaas Bruinsma proves himself a sadistic and sinister drug lord.

== Release ==
The series was released on January 19, 2018 on Netflix streaming.
