= Walsh Street police shootings =

1988 murders of two police officers in Melbourne, Australia

Coordinates: 37.832889°S 144.98582°E

- Constables Steven Tynan (left) and Damian Eyre (right), the two officers killed in the shooting
- Location: Walsh Street, South Yarra, Victoria, Australia
- Date: 12 October 1988; 38 years ago 4:50 am (UTC+10:00)
- Attack type: Ambush, double-murder
- Weapons: Shotgun; Revolver (taken from police officer)
- Deaths: 2
- Victims: Constable Steven Tynan; Constable Damian Eyre
- Motive: Unknown
- Accused: Victor Peirce, Trevor Pettingill, Anthony Leigh Farrell, Peter David McEvoy, Jedd Houghton, and Gary Abdallah

The Walsh Street police shootings occurred in the early hours of 12 October 1988 in South Yarra, Melbourne, Australia. Victoria Police constables Steven Tynan, 22, and Damian Eyre, 20, were investigating an abandoned vehicle on Walsh Street when they were gunned down by unknown assailants. Four men, Victor Peirce, Trevor Pettingill, Anthony Leigh Farrell and Peter David McEvoy, were charged with murder, but were later acquitted by a jury in the Supreme Court of Victoria. Two other suspects, Jedd Houghton and Gary Abdallah, were shot and killed by Victoria Police before being brought to trial.

In 2005, Wendy Peirce, the widow of Victor, who had been convicted of perjury in connection with the shooting, gave an interview to the mass media, in which she stated that her late husband had planned and carried out the murders and that he was actually guilty as charged.

== Background ==
The 1980s saw a high number of armed robberies being committed throughout Melbourne, to the point where they had become a problem for police forces across Australia. Rather than single robbers committing robberies on impulse, professional armed robbers organised in gangs began planning their robberies in advance by conducting surveillance on targets known to carry large amount of cash, selecting gang members, assigning roles, organising weaponry and equipment needed, arranging the getaway vehicles, and organising safehouses. The armed robbery gangs not only carried out their robberies with precision, but they also carried out their robberies with threats of violence.

Since the 1878 attack on three police officers by the Ned Kelly Gang, criminal attacks on police officers were considered as rare events in Victoria. During the 1980s however, there had been a number of random acts of violence committed against members of the Victoria Police.

=== Prior attacks against Victoria police officers ===
==== 1984 Beaumaris shootings ====
In the early hours of 22 November 1984, Sergeant Peter Kearon and Constable Graham Fletcher, operating a divisional van, were conducting licence checks on the vehicles on Beach Road in Beaumaris. At 1:35 am, Kearon and Fletcher stopped a blue and white 1966 Holden with a missing headlight driven by 19-year-old Kai "Matty" Korhonen, a former army recruit from Clayton who was dismissed from his job at a car yard an hour prior. He had previously shot and killed a security guard named Peter Poole outside of the Boral Melwire factory in Clayton South around the same time. Korhonen pulled alongside the officers' van before getting out and firing three shots at them with a .223 Leader carbine semi-automatic rifle. He then got back in his vehicle and sped off, beginning a short chase along Beach Road. Korhonen then turned onto Tramway Parade and came to a stop on Oak Street near the Gibbs Street intersection, where he got out again and fired three more shots at the pursuing officers. Kearon received a cut above his eye from flying glass caused by bullets shattering the van's windshield, while Fletcher escaped injury by taking cover under the van's dashboard.

After shooting at Kearon and Fletcher, Korhonen took off on foot, cutting across the nearby Banksia Reserve back towards Tramway Parade. On Tramway Parade, Korhonen opened fire on an unmarked patrol car containing Senior Constables Ron Fenton and Paul Gilbert from Caulfield, who were searching for the gunman responsible for Poole's murder. Gilbert received wounds from bullet fragments to his back, while Fenton received a wound to the back of his head for which he had to undergo neurosurgery and was placed in a medically induced coma for ten days. Korhonen was later captured and convicted of Poole's murder and the attempted murders of the four police officers; he was sentenced to 88 years' imprisonment, but was released after serving just 15 years.

==== 1985 Pavel Marinof shootings and manhunt ====
On the night of 18 June 1985, Constable Peter Steele and Sergeant Brian Stooke were sitting in an unmarked patrol car outside of a warehouse in Cheltenham where a burglary had occurred days earlier. At 12:03 am on 19 June, they spotted a yellow Ford Cortina circling the street several times outside the warehouse. Thinking it was a burglar, Steele and Stooke followed the vehicle and pulled it over to conduct an inspection. The vehicle was registered to a man named Max Clark. As the officers were conducting the inspection, the driver got out of the vehicle, produced a firearm, and shot both officers before fleeing the scene. Constable Steele received a wound to his hand, while Sergeant Stooke was hit four times, one of which severed his spinal cord.

The gunman then drove to his home, where he grabbed more firearms and ammunition before leaving his home in a second vehicle, a green Ford Fairlane. At 3:00 am, nearly three hours after the Cheltenham shooting, the Fairlane was spotted by Sergeant Ray Kirkwood and Constable Graeme Sayce, who were in a patrol car, in Oakleigh. In the subsequent car chase, the Fairlane's engine blew, rendering the vehicle inoperable. The gunman took off on foot with Kirkwood and Sayce in pursuit. Cornered, he then produced two firearms and opened fire on the two officers. Two bullets went through the patrol car's windshield and wounded Sergeant Kirkwood. Thirty minutes later, the gunman shot police dog handler Senior Constable Gary Morrell, who was saved from injury by his police-issued ballistic vest.

Further police checks revealed that the gunman's real name was Pavel Vasilof Marinof (born 20 September 1946), a Bulgarian immigrant from South Clayton who had changed his name to Max Clark in 1975, the same year he became a naturalized Australian citizen. In a raid on Marinof's home, police recovered firearms, several rounds of ammunition, and several items which included petty cash stolen by Marinof in the months prior to the shootings. As Marinof had ties to the local Eastern European community, police begun their manhunt in the suburb of Noble Park, known for Melbourne's large Eastern European population, including migrants from Yugoslavia and Macedonia. As the tactics used in the manhunt for Marinof was causing concerns and attracting criticism from the Eastern European community, the manhunt team included Detective Sergeant John "Kappa" Kapetanovski, who was a fluent speaker in both Macedonian and Serbo-Croatian languages, to establish a public trust between police and the Eastern European community.

Marinof (dubbed in the media as Mad Max) went on a crime spree, committing various robberies and thefts, including stealing a machine gun and several rounds of ammunition from an army base. In a public appeal, police offered a A$50,000 reward for information leading to Marinof's whereabouts.

Eight months later, a tip came in that Marinof was staying at a property owned by members of an outlaw motorcycle club near Wallan. Acting on the tip, Detective Sergeant Kapetanovski and his partner Detective Senior Constable Rodney MacDonald conducted surveillance of the property on 25 February 1986, during which they spotted Marinof in a wig and beard driving off in a Queensland-registered Ford Falcon panel van. Kapetanovski and MacDonald followed the vehicle a short distance before pulling it over. As the vehicles came to a stop, Marinof produced a firearm and opened fire on the two officers, seriously wounding them both. Despite being wounded in the chest, MacDonald managed to return fire with his police-issued shotgun, shattering the van's rear window and mortally wounding Marinof, whose van then veered off the road and crashed through a wooden fence into a paddock. Officers surrounded the vehicle and found Marinof's body in the driver's seat. Both Sergeant Kapetanovski and Senior Constable MacDonald later made a full recovery.

==== 1986 bombing of Victoria Police headquarters ====
On 27 March 1986, a car bomb exploded outside the Russell Street Police Headquarters, mortally injuring Constable Angela Taylor who died from her injuries 24 days later, becoming the first Australian policewoman to be killed in the line of duty. The attack heightened fears within the Victoria Police that any officer on duty elsewhere could be considered as a target of a criminal attack.

==== Killing of Senior Constable Maurice Moore ====
In the early hours of 27 September 1986, Senior Constable Maurice Moore was on duty at the Maryborough police station when he left the station to get a bottle of milk from his home. As Moore turned onto Brougham Street, he came across two men pushing a stolen vehicle. One of the men, 28-year-old Robert Nowell, was quickly detained by Moore; his partner fled when he saw Moore's patrol car coming towards them. As Moore was taking down the details of the offense, Nowell overpowered Moore, grabbed the latter's police-issued service revolver, and shot the policeman five times, killing him. Nowell later gave himself up to police in Ballarat and was later convicted of Moore's murder on 8 September 1987.

== Events ==
=== Prior events ===
On 11 October 1988, Victor Peirce's best friend, Graeme Jensen, was fatally shot by police in Narre Warren. Jensen had been under observation by the Victoria Police Armed Robbery Squad, who had planned to arrest him in connection with an armed robbery and murder. Three cars containing eight detectives attempted to block Jensen in as he left a local store, but one of the cars was delayed by passing traffic, allowing Jensen to drive through. Police officers later claimed that they saw Jensen brandish a firearm. Police yelled at Jensen to stop; one detective yelled: "He's got a gun." Jensen was then shot dead, and his car crashed into a roadside pole.

=== Killings ===
Thirteen hours after Jensen's death, at 4:39 am on 12 October, an abandoned Holden Commodore on Walsh Street, South Yarra, was reported to Victoria Police. The call would have usually been answered by police units from St Kilda Road or South Melbourne police stations, but on the night of the murders, St Kilda Road police station had a shortage of officers on duty and were unable to send a divisional van, and the only available South Melbourne police unit, another divisional van, had been called to a suspected suicide in St. Kilda. Instead, a divisional van from Prahran police station driven by Constables Steven Tynan and Damian Eyre with the call sign Prahran 311 was dispatched to the scene as they were the first available officers in the area.

At 4:50 am, the two officers were ambushed by armed offenders while examining the abandoned vehicle. One gunman armed with a shotgun shot Constable Tynan while he was sitting in the car. Constable Eyre, despite having suffered serious injuries, is believed to have struggled with the attacker/s until someone approached him from behind, managed to remove Eyre's service revolver from its holster, and shot him in the head with it.

Upon hearing reports from residents on Walsh Street about shots fired, the police communications officer attempted to contact Tynan and Eyre, but got no response. The South Melbourne district supervising inspector was then contacted. As more reports of gunfire from Walsh Street were coming in, concern grew at Victoria Police Headquarters. Within minutes, police units from Russell Street, South Melbourne, and St. Kilda were converging onto the scene. A South Melbourne unit was the first on the scene, and found Tynan and Eyre's van parked behind the abandoned Commodore in the middle of the road with the engine running and the driver's side door open. Eyre was found lying by the rear of the vehicle, while Tynan was found lying partially in the Commodore's driver's seat.

Police believed members of a Melbourne armed robbery gang had organised the murders. In the period up to April 1989, there had been an unusually high number of fatal shootings of suspects by police. The killings of the two police officers were viewed by many as a form of payback by members of the Melbourne underworld.

== Investigation ==
The police investigation was known as the Ty-Eyre Task Force, a combination of the two surnames of the officers killed. Detective Inspector John Noonan was the officer in charge. It was the biggest investigation Victoria Police had ever undertaken at the time and also the longest running, spanning around two-and-a-half years. At the height of the investigation, police had hundreds of officers working with the task force to investigate the murders.

Police investigations revealed the shotgun used to perform the murders was the same weapon used earlier in a bungled attempt to blast open a bank door during a robbery at the State Bank in Oak Park seven months earlier. A gang, dubbed the "Flemington Crew" by police, had robbed at least four Melbourne banks. The robbers, on the security CCTV at the Oak Park robbery, left shotgun shells at the scene. Seven months into the investigation, the shotgun itself was found half-buried in an inner-city golf-course plant bed by a gardener. The shotgun and shells became the single forensic link police had, linking the Oak Park robbery to the same shotgun used in the Walsh Street murders. The shotgun and empty shotgun shell casings are on display at the Victoria Police Museum, Melbourne.

=== Pettingill family ===
Members of the gangs responsible for the robberies were believed to be Victor Peirce, Graeme Jensen, Jedd Houghton and Peter David McEvoy. The home of Victor Peirce was raided the day following the Walsh Street shootings. Peirce's house was later demolished and the backyard dug up in the search for evidence.

== Trial ==
The trial of the four men accused, Victor Peirce, Trevor Pettingill, Anthony Leigh Farrell and Peter David McEvoy, began in March 1991. The prosecution alleged six people were involved in the planning of the shootings: the accused, Jason Ryan, and the late Jedd Houghton.

=== Prosecution ===
Jason Ryan became a prosecution witness in the trial and was offered immunity in exchange for his testimony. Police placed Ryan under the witness protection program and moved him to Mansfield on 24 October 1988 for questioning. His evidence changed a number of times up to the opening of the trial.

Ryan's evidence had implicated Gary Abdallah, Jedd Houghton, Anthony Leigh Farrell and Emmanuel Alexandris. Police were told the party of killers were Jedd Houghton, Peter David McEvoy, Anthony Leigh Farrell and his uncles Victor Peirce and Trevor Pettingill. Houghton was shot and killed during a police raid on the Big4 Ascot Holiday Park in Bendigo in November 1988. In April 1989, detectives went to arrest Abdallah and stated he pulled an imitation pistol on them. Detective Cliff Lockwood shot Abdallah six times with his own revolver then took his partners revolver and used it to fire a seventh bullet into the back of Abdallah's head; the autopsy stated that the seventh shot killed him and that he otherwise would likely have survived. Lockwood was charged with Abdallah's murder though was acquitted.

Victor Peirce's wife, Wendy Peirce, also became a prosecution witness and entered the witness protection program. She had previously maintained her husband was with her in a motel all night on the night of the murders; she retracted this alibi in preparation to testify against her husband. But, in a pre-trial hearing, she retracted her retraction and, as a hostile witness, did not appear at the trial.

=== Not guilty verdict ===
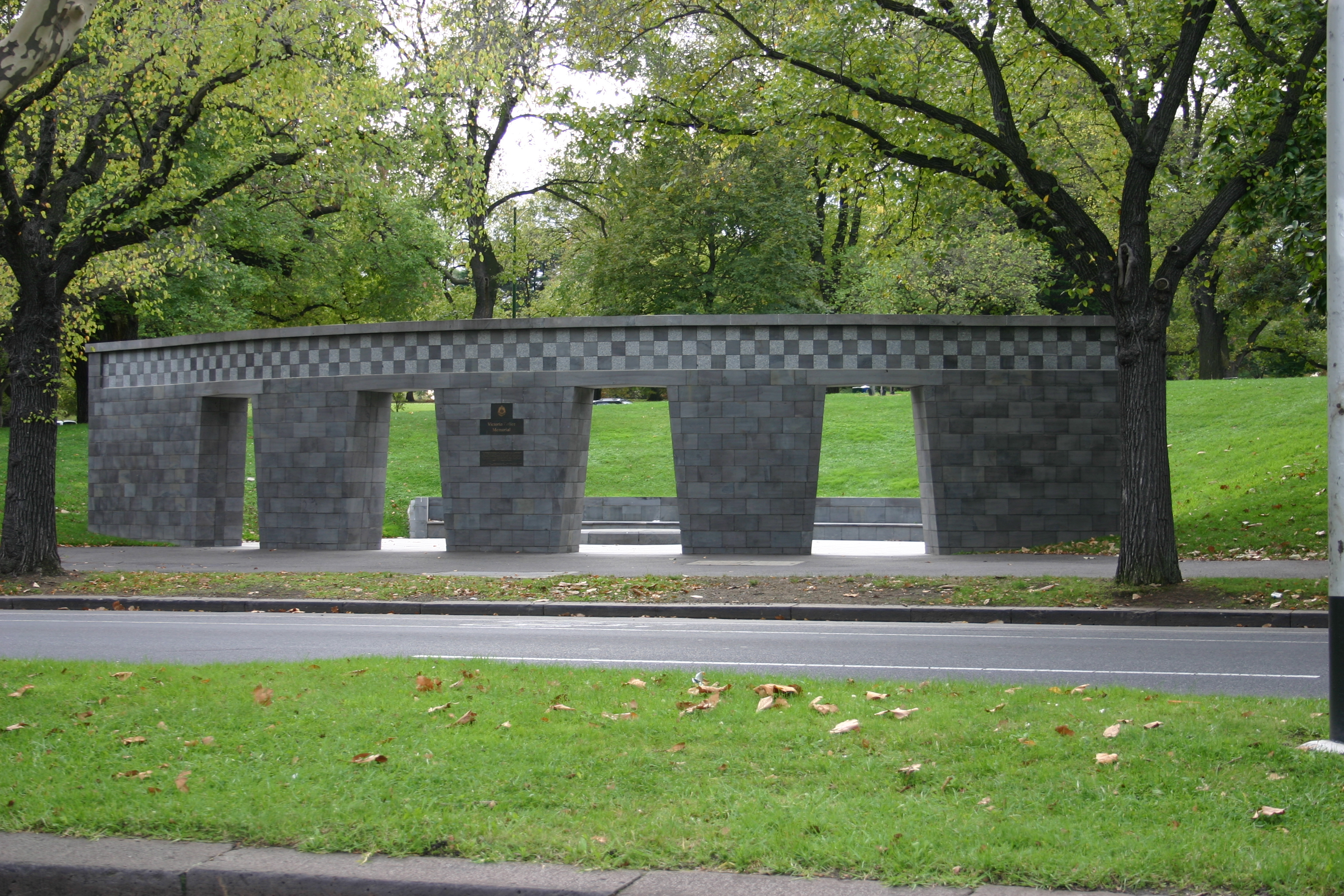
A memorial in Kings Domain, Melbourne to Victoria Police officers killed in the line of duty

All four men charged with the murders were acquitted in the Supreme Court of Victoria.

Victor Peirce and Peter David McEvoy were taken back into custody on other charges. Upon receiving the verdict, D24 sent a broadcast of the verdict to every police officer in Melbourne, telling them to keep control and resist from carrying out any acts of retaliation against the defendants.

Wendy Peirce was charged with perjury, convicted and sentenced to serve 9 months non-parole.

== Timeline of relevant events ==
- 25 January 1987 – Mark Militano is shot and killed by Victoria Police
- June, 1987 – Frank Valastro is shot and killed by Victoria Police
- 11 October 1988 – Graeme Jensen is killed
- 12 October 1988, approx. 4:50 am – Walsh Street killings occur
- 21 October 1988, TyEyre taskforce set up
- 24 October 1988 – Jason Ryan moved to Mansfield and placed under witness protection
- 17 November 1988 – Jedd Houghton shot and killed by police in a Bendigo caravan park.
- 9 April 1989 – Gary Abdallah is shot and killed by Victoria Police after pulling an imitation pistol on detectives.
- 26 March 1991 – four accused men found not guilty.
- 1 May 2002 – Victor Peirce shot and killed in Bay Street, Port Melbourne in drive-by shooting linked to Andrew Veniamin
- October, 2005 – Widow of Victor Peirce, Wendy Peirce gives an interview to John Silvester, detailing her husband's involvement in the crime.
- February, 2010 – Peter McEvoy told New South Wales Police, in anger, that he had heard the final words of a dying constable, prompting calls for a coronial inquest into the deaths of the two policemen.
- 13 March 2011 – Sunday Night airs former police officer Malcolm Rosenes' claim that Graeme Jensen was killed in cold blood and had a sawn-off rifle planted in his car after death.
- October, 2011 – The book A Pack of Bloody Animals was published, concluding that two of the defendants, Anthony Farrell and Trevor Pettingill, played no part in the murders of the two policemen.

== In popular culture ==
The Seven Network aired a documentary on the shootings in 2010 titled "Police Under Fire: The Walsh Street Killings". The Walsh Street shootings and the people responsible for them inspired the fictional 2010 feature film Animal Kingdom and the 2011 television docudrama Killing Time. They were also mentioned several times in the 2011 docudrama Underbelly Files: Tell Them Lucifer was Here (which concerned the 1998 Silk–Miller police murders in Melbourne).

The Walsh Street shootings were a subject of the Screen Australia/Film Victoria documentary Trigger Point, aired by the ABC in 2014, which also documented questionable cases of shootings of criminals by police, and training programmes aimed at reducing such incidents. The case was also covered by Casefile True Crime Podcast on 29 July 2017.

== See also ==
- The Stringybark Creek police murders
- Silk–Miller police murders
- Melbourne gangland killings
- Crime in Melbourne
- List of unsolved murders (1980–1999)
