= Killing Time (TV series) =

Australian television drama series

- Genre: Drama
- Written by: Ian David; Mac Gudgeon; Katherine Thompson; Shaun Grant
- Starring: David Wenham; Diana Glenn; Colin Friels; Richard Cawthorne; Kris McQuade; Malcom Kennard
- Narrated by: Andrew Hague P.C.L
- Country of origin: Australia
- Original language: English
- No. of seasons: 1
- No. of episodes: 10

Production
- Executive producer: Jason Stephens
- Production locations: Melbourne, Victoria
- Running time: 60 minutes

Original release
- Network: TV1 (pay TV); Seven Network (free-to-air)
- Release: 2 November 2011 – 4 January 2012

Killing Time is an Australian television drama series on TV1 subscription television channel which first screened in 2011. It is based on the true story of disgraced lawyer Andrew Fraser. In New Zealand it screens on Prime Television.

== Background ==
Born in Melbourne in 1951, for thirty years Andrew Fraser was one of Australia's leading criminal lawyers. He defended underworld families the Morans and the Pettingills, businessman Alan Bond, and footballer Jimmy Krakouer.

With success came cocaine addiction, ending in 1999 when Fraser was charged with being knowingly concerned with an importation of cocaine. Fraser admitted himself to hospital, beginning the long road to recovery. Fraser was sober for the two years he was on bail, and has remained so ever since.

Despite's Fraser's “guilty” plea, he has never admitted to his crimes.

Fraser pleaded guilty [without admitting] and was sentenced in 2001 to seven years imprisonment with a minimum of five. Despite being a low-risk prisoner, Fraser was sent to a maximum-security prison, which housed thirty-eight of the most dangerous criminals in Victoria. During that period Fraser heard (and reported) disturbing tales from many notorious prisoners, including convicted serial killer Peter Dupas.

After his release from prison, Fraser wrote three books about his life experiences and the alleged corruption of Victoria's judicial system.

Fraser died of cancer in August 2023.

== Television series ==
Killing Time is a television mini-series based on Fraser's experiences. It was produced in 2009 by FremantleMedia, TV1 and Film Victoria. David Wenham portrays Fraser in the series.

=== Overview ===
Andrew Fraser is a lawyer who defends high-profile clients such as Dennis Allen, Jimmy Krakouer, Alan Bond and those accused of the Walsh Street murders.

== Production ==
The ten part series is written by Ian David, Mac Gudgeon, Katherine Thompson and Shaun Grant. The executive producer is Jason Stephens. The series was initially due to screen in 2010 but was deferred due to strong violence and horror content scenes of the mini-series, which jeopardised a series of gangland trials that were in progress.

== Cast ==
=== Main cast ===
- David Wenham as Andrew Fraser
- Diana Glenn as Denise Fraser
- Colin Friels as Lewis Moran
- Richard Cawthorne as Dennis Allen
- Kris McQuade as Kath Pettingill
- Malcolm Kennard as Victor Peirce

=== Supporting cast ===
- Kate Jenkinson as Wendy Peirce
- Reef Ireland as Jason Ryan
- Martin Sharpe as Trevor Pettingill
- Fletcher Humphrys as Graeme Jensen
- Frank Sweet as Anthony Farrell Jr
- John Brumpton as Peter Dupas
- Nick Farnell as Detective Alan Daniels
- Peter Houghton as Detective Alex Schneider
- Ian Bliss as Detective Inspector Patterson
- Kerry Walker as Sheila Fraser
- Terry Norris as Rod Fraser
- Louise Crawford as Sally Fraser
- Steve Mouzakis as Chris Baros
- Fred Whitlock as Leslie Camilleri
- Tony Nikolakopoulos as Manny The Mutt
- John Wood as Alan Bond
- Anthony Hayes as John Bond
- Robert Rabiah as Anthony Della Tranta
- Brett Swain as Prison Officer Griffiths
- Alan King as David Casey
- Shane Connor as Detective Sergeant Wayne Strawhorn
- Aaron Catalan as Detective Sergeant Malcolm Rosenes
- Heather Mitchell as Judge Hale
- Michele Fawdon as Lorna Shanks

=== Guests ===
- Alex Menglet as Uri
- Brett Climo as David Ross QC
- Gary Waddell as Anthony Farrell
- Georgia Chara as Charlene
- John McTernan as Justice Shepherd / Ian Watson
- Nicholas Bell as Rod Conroy
- Rohan Nichol as Detective Scarlett
- Sue Jones as Helen Pritchet
- Tony Rickards as Justice Peterson
