= Dennis Allen (criminal) =

Australian criminal (1951–1987)

- Dennis Allen
- Born: Dennis Bruce Allen; 7 November 1951; Carlton, Victoria, Australia
- Died: 13 April 1987 (aged 35); Melbourne, Victoria, Australia
- Other names: Mr. Death, Mr. D
- Occupations: Drug dealer, criminal
- Spouse: Sissy
- Children: 1
- Parent: Kath Pettingill

Dennis Bruce Allen (7 November 1951 – 13 April 1987) was a notorious Australian drug dealer and alleged serial killer based in Melbourne. He was the oldest son of Kath Pettingill, a criminal matriarch. Allen's lawyer, Andrew Fraser, helped him avoid jail time by leveraging his knowledge of corrupt Victorian police officers at the time. However, Allen died of heart disease in 1987 while in prison custody, awaiting trial for murder.

== Criminal career ==
Dennis Allen, known as Mr. Death or Mr. D, was suspected of involvement in up to 13 (Note: Note that Tedmanson reports that Allen was suspected of up to 13 murders, while Shand reports 15.) underworld murders, including the gruesome chainsaw dismemberment of Hells Angels biker Anton Kenny in 1985. He also attempted to gatecrash a party, shooting guitarist Chris Stockley of The Dingoes in the stomach.

Allen had previously received a ten-year prison sentence for gang rape in the 1970s, where he served five years out of a 10-year sentence. He was a major drug dealer in Melbourne's Richmond and South Yarra areas during the 1980s.

New South Wales Police Detective-Sergeant Roger Rogerson was convicted of supplying heroin in a deal with Allen, but was later acquitted on appeal.

Allen managed to evade capture and prosecution by possessing incriminating information against corrupt Victorian police officers.

== Death ==
Allen died on 13 April 1987, at St. Vincent's Hospital, Melbourne, due to heart failure caused by years of heavy drug abuse, which led to pieces of his heart breaking off. His funeral was held with Father Peter Norden, a Jesuit priest officiating. Notably, Father Norden also performed the funerals of three other Pettingill family members during the 1980s.
