= Pettingill family =

Australian criminal family

- Territory: Melbourne
- Ethnicity: White Australians
- Membership: ca. 12 members
- Criminal activities: drug trafficking, arms dealing, armed robberies
- Allies: The Carlton Crew

The Pettingill family is a Melbourne-based criminal family. Family members have many convictions for criminal offences including drug trafficking, arms dealing and armed robberies.

Two of former matriarch Kath Pettingill's sons, Victor Peirce and Trevor Pettingill, faced a murder trial for the 1988 Walsh Street police shootings, with both acquitted along with two fellow defendants. Victor Peirce's de facto wife, Wendy, later claimed that her husband planned and carried out the murders with the fellow accused. The family was also involved in the infamous Melbourne gangland killings, where it suffered a major blow, with the death of one of its highest-ranking members, Victor Peirce, and resulting in its power being greatly weakened.

== Family members ==
=== Kath Pettingill ===
Kath Pettingill
- Born: 27 March 1935
- Died: 1 August 2026 (aged 91)
- Other name: Granny Evil
- Occupation: Brothel owner
- Children: 10
- Conviction: Drug trafficking

=== Dennis Allen ===
Dennis Allen
- Born: 7 November 1951
- Died: 13 April 1987 (aged 35)
- Other names: Mr. Death, Mr. D
- Children: 3
- Parent: Kath Pettingill
- Status: Died of heart failure
- Conviction: Rape
- Penalty: 10 years imprisonment

Dennis Allen (nicknamed Mr. Death or Mr. D) was the oldest son of Kath Pettingill. Allen was sentenced during the 1970s to a ten-year prison sentence for rape and was reported to have been a major player in drug dealing in the Richmond and South Yarra areas during the 1980s.

Allen was alleged to have ordered or carried out the deaths of 15 people. Allen died of heart failure in 1987 while in prison custody awaiting trial for murder.

Police officer Roger Rogerson received his first criminal conviction in 1985 for involvement in drug trafficking when he was charged with conspiring with Allen to import heroin.

=== Peter Allen ===
Peter Allen
- Born: 25 January 1953 (age 73)
- Children: 3
- Parent: Kath Pettingill
- Status: Still alive
- Convictions: Armed robbery, assault, drug dealing, drug trafficking

Peter Allen is the second oldest son of Kath Pettingill. He has spent 28 years in prison. He is a violent armed robber and has a long list of assault charges. He ran a heroin empire which allowed him to purchase a mansion in Lower Templestowe. This was later taken from him due to the Proceeds of Crime act. He continued to deal heroin in jail.

He is very skilled in court and is considered to be the "jailhouse lawyer" of the family. He was released from prison in 2002 after serving time for an armed robbery conviction.

=== Vicki Brooks (nee Pettingill) ===
First born daughter and third child of Kath Pettingill. Born in 1954.

=== Victor Peirce ===
Victor Peirce
- Born: 11 November 1958
- Died: 1 May 2002 (aged 44); Port Melbourne, Victoria
- Occupation: Waterside worker
- Spouse: Wendy Peirce
- Children: 5 (Christopher Peirce born 1976, Victor Peirce Jnr born 1978, Katie Peirce born 1985–2009, Mathew Peirce born 1989 and Vinnie Peirce born 1992)
- Parent: Kath Pettingill
- Status: Murdered
- Conviction: Drug trafficking
- Penalty: 6 years imprisonment

Victor George Peirce was the sixth child of Kath Pettingill. Together with his de facto partner, Wendy Peirce, he fathered five children. He was convicted of drug trafficking and served a six-year prison sentence during the 1990s. He once worked as a bodyguard for murdered businessman Frank Benvenuto.

Victor Peirce was murdered in Bay St, Port Melbourne, whilst parked outside a supermarket on 1 May 2002. It would later be alleged in court by barrister and Queen's Counsel Robert Richter that the now-deceased contract killer Andrew Veniamin had murdered Peirce. Veniamin was shot and killed during an argument in 2004 with Mick Gatto in a Carlton restaurant.

==== Wendy Peirce ====
Wendy Peirce was the de facto partner of Victor Peirce. The couple never married but produced three children from their long-term relationship.

She entered witness protection for 18 months, estimated to have cost approximately $2million. At trial, she refused to give evidence against the accused, and all men were later acquitted. In October 2005, Wendy Peirce gave a media interview detailing how her husband planned and carried out the Walsh Street police shootings for which he was charged and later acquitted.

In September 2008 Wendy Peirce was jailed for six months after pleading guilty to threatening and stalking former lovers of her ex-partner Victor who was murdered in 2002 during Melbourne's underworld war. The threats included using Facebook to make death threats.

==== Katie Peirce ====
On 15 December 2009, Wendy and Victor Peirce's 24-year-old daughter, Katie Peirce, was found dead in her home in Greensborough. At the time of her death, she and her mother were on bail for an incident at the Clare Castle Hotel in Port Melbourne on 28 March 2009, when Mark Lohse, a regular patron at the hotel, was attacked with a meat cleaver and left seriously injured with a deep and long gash across his face, three fractures to his jaw, broken teeth and facial nerve damage. Police allege that Wendy and Katie Peirce and a third woman agreed to pay Tong Yang A$200 to assault Robert Sales, the father of a woman who was dating Katie Peirce's ex-boyfriend. Sales had been sitting one table away from where the assault occurred but was outside having a cigarette at the time of the assault, and in a case of mistaken identity Mark Lohse was hacked across the face with the meat cleaver. Senior County Court judge Geoff Chettle said at the plea hearing the incident was "the worst example of intentionally causing serious injury he has seen." Tong Yang pleaded guilty to charges of intentionally causing serious injury, but Katie and Wendy Peirce both pleaded not guilty to charges that included attempted murder and intentionally causing serious injury. Katie was bailed pending a committal hearing which had only been partly heard at the time of her death. Wendy Peirce's lawyer said he had spoken to her on the phone on 15 December 2009 to inform her of her daughter's death and would apply to the prison for permission allowing her to attend the funeral.

=== Lex Peirce ===
Lex Peirce (born 1960) is the seventh child and fifth son of Kath Pettingill and has a minor criminal record.

=== Jamie Pettingill ===
Ninth child of Kath Pettingill. Born 1963. Died of a heroin overdose in 1985 aged 21. Was alleged to have been involved in an armed robbery in Clifton Hill.

=== Trevor Pettingill ===
Trevor Pettingill is the tenth and last child of Kath Pettingill, born in 1965. He has a history involving drugs and burglaries. He has multiple convictions for firearms and drug-related offences, and has served several jail terms. He has been described as a "career criminal".

Pettingill was charged and acquitted over the Walsh Street police murders.

Trevor's son Jamie Pettingill had two criminal convictions including one for assault.

== In popular culture ==
Members of the family, their associates and real life exploits, have been depicted in multiple media works.

These include television docudramas like the series Underbelly and the 2009 miniseries Killing Time, and fictionalised versions of family members, which have been the basis for key characters in:

- Two Australian TV series: Janus and Phoenix
- The Australian film Animal Kingdom (2010)
  - Stephen Sewell's novel, Animal Kingdom, A Crime Story (2010), based on the 2010 Australian film
  - The US television series Animal Kingdom, based on the eponymous 2010 Australian film, albeit with the setting transposed to Southern California

The Pettingills were also featured in the fourth episode of season one of the Netflix original Drug Lords.
