= Vehicle registration plates of Queensland =

Queensland, Australian vehicle license plates

The Australian state of Queensland requires its residents to register their motor vehicles and display vehicle registration plates. Current regular issue plates are to the standard Australian dimensions of 372 mm (14.6 in) in length by 134 mm (5.3 in) in height, and use standard Australian serial dies.

== Issuing authorities ==
- Police Traffic Department: 1906-July 1921
- Main Roads Department: 1950s–1990
- Queensland Transport: 1990–2009
- Department of Transport & Main Roads: 2009–present

== General series ==
Vehicles Standard series: 000·RX7

Vehicles Sequential Series: 000·A2F

Motorcycles: 2FM·00

Large trailers (over 1.02t ATM): 000·UYH

Small trailers (up to 1.02t ATM): GC-0000

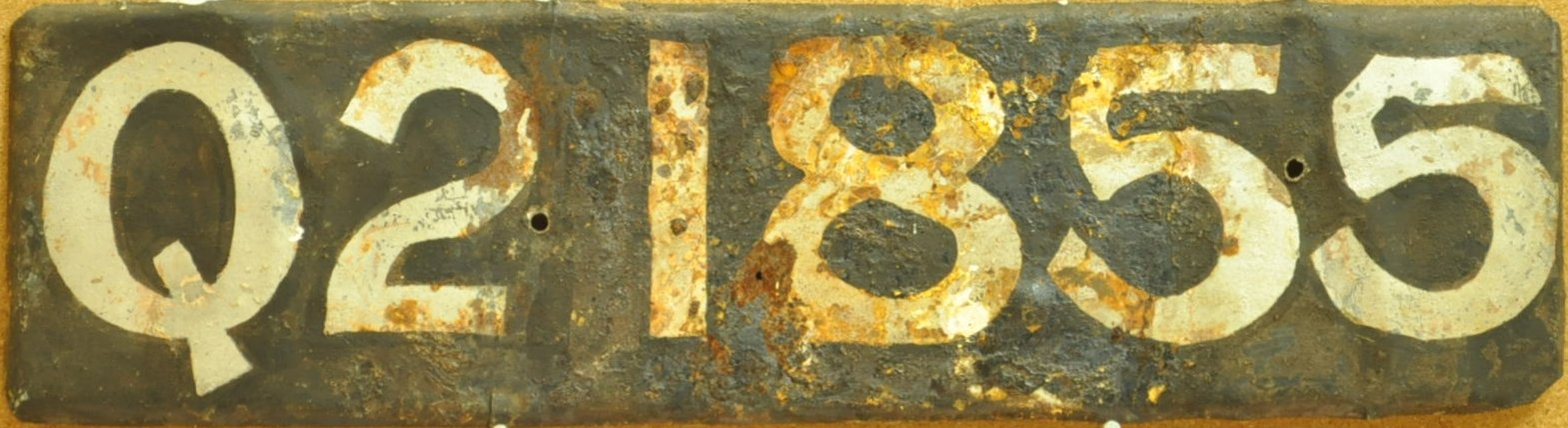
Queensland Registration plate from 1924. Until the 1930s, most number plates in Queensland were made by the owner.

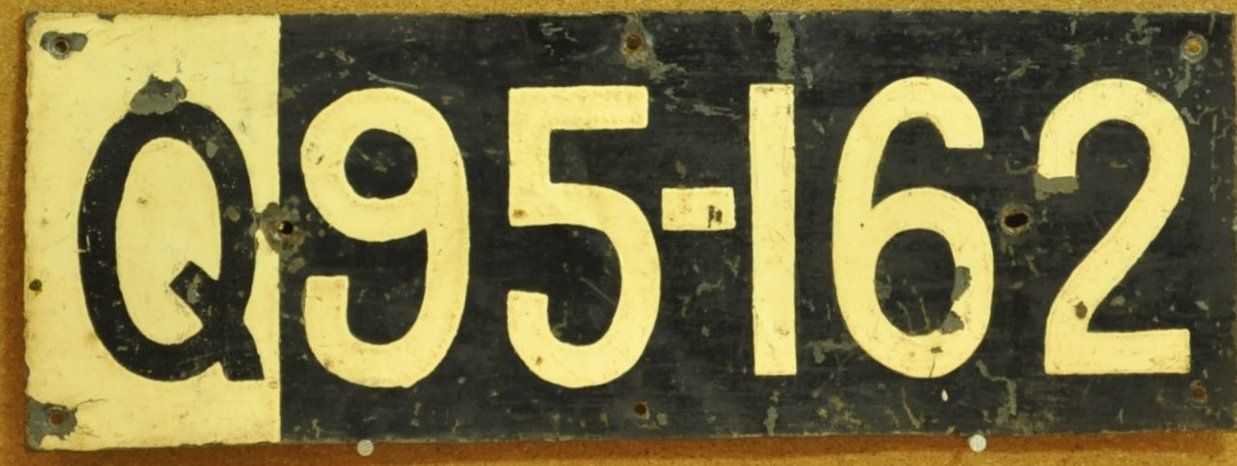
Queensland Registration plate from 1928

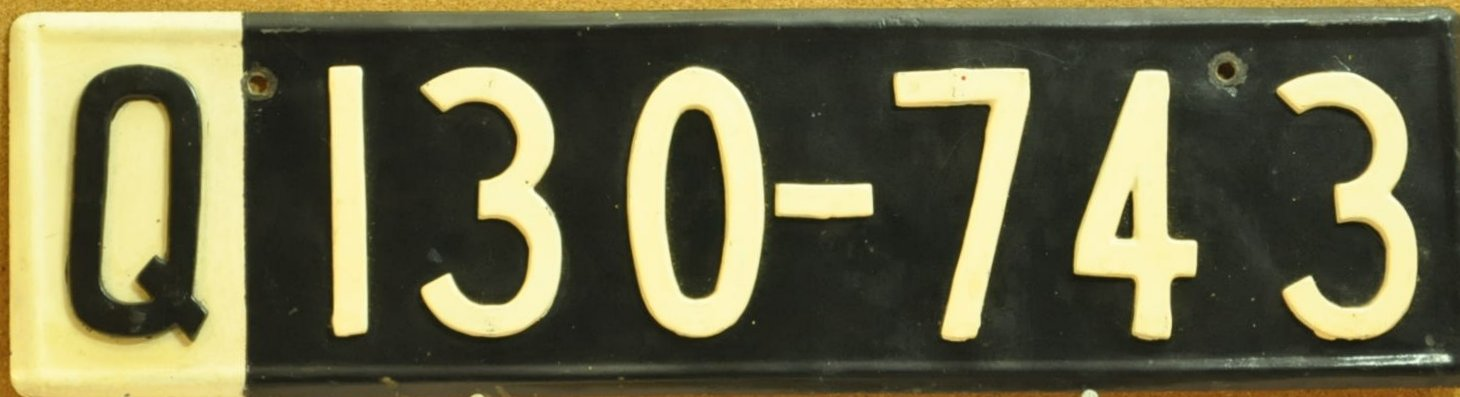
Queensland number plate from 1930

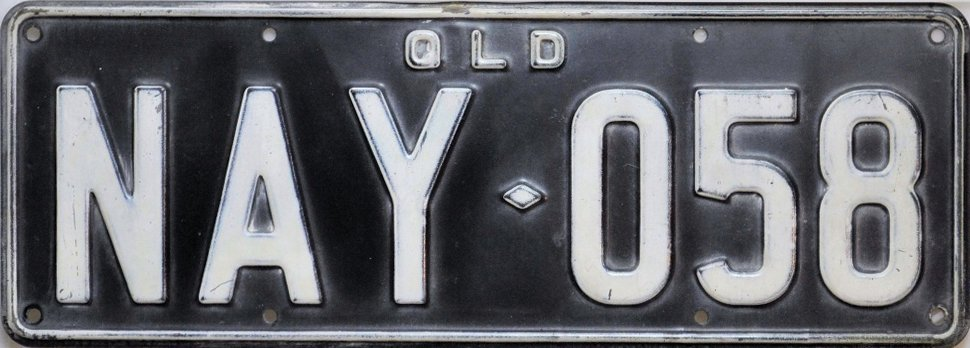
Queensland number plate from 1955

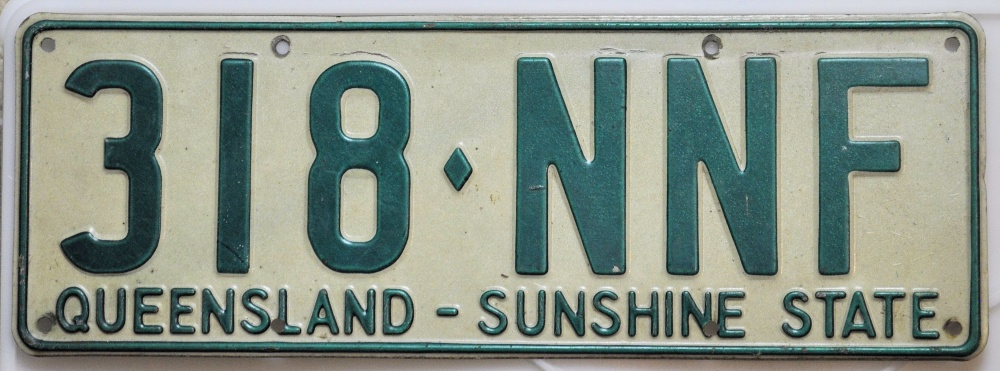
Queensland number plate from 1979, with steel base and a reflective sheeting background

- On 29 May 1914 the Queensland Traffic Act was amended so that the Police Commissioner had the discretion to assign an initial identification letter to each traffic district in which the vehicle was registered. For example, plates beginning with A were registered in Brisbane; B in Rockhampton; C in Toowoomba, P in Hughenden.
- From June 1, 1921, to March 31, 1925, the initial Q12345 were all white on black base.
- From April 1, 1925, until 1955, the plates were "Q|123-456". The "Q" area was painted black on a white background, while the numbers were painted white on a black background. A dash was placed before the last three digits.

Starting on 1 July 1955, plates were manufactured in the format aaa-nnn with white text on a black base. The block used was NAA·000 to PZZ·999, starting at NAA-000, with the O-series initially skipped and used last.

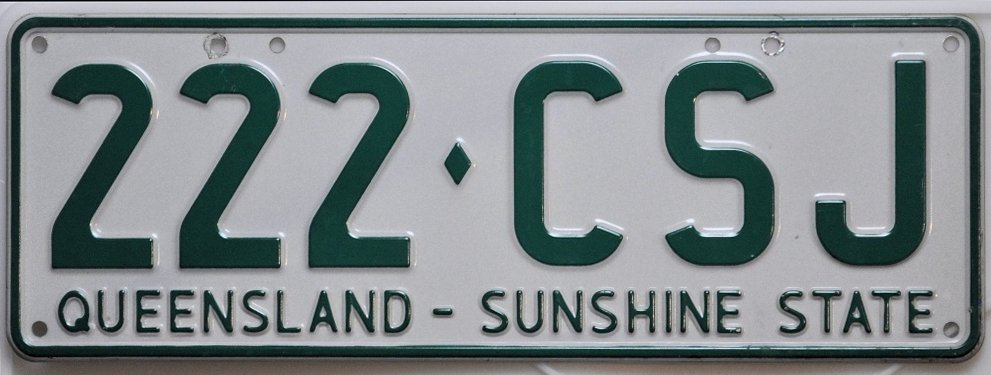
Queensland number plate from 1994, made from aluminium

Once the aaa·nnn format between NAA·000 and PZZ·999 was exhausted, Queensland reversed the order to nnn·aaa, starting 1 July 1977. These plates were issued with green text on a white reflective background and bore the slogan Queensland – Sunshine State. As such Queensland became the second jurisdiction in Australia to issue sloganised plates. This series started at 000·NAA and spanned through to 999·PZZ. After exhausting this initial allocation, in late 1987, Queensland began issuing combinations from 000·AAA onwards.

On 28 September 2001, the last plate with green text was manufactured—999·GKJ.

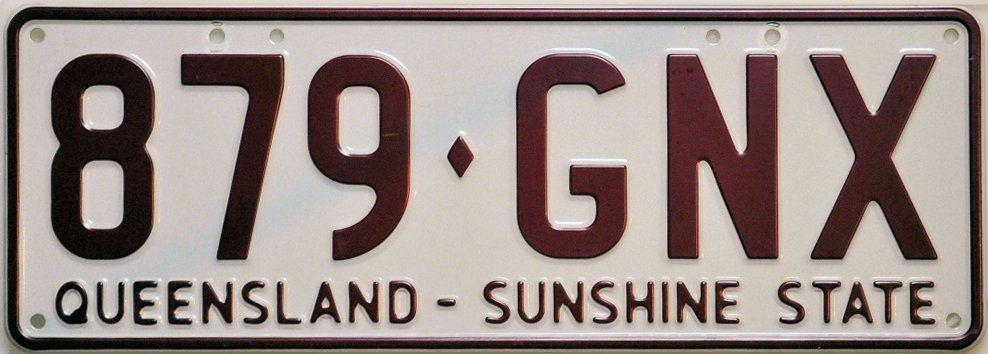
Queensland number plate from 2002 until 2020. The colour on these number plates changed from green to maroon in 2001.

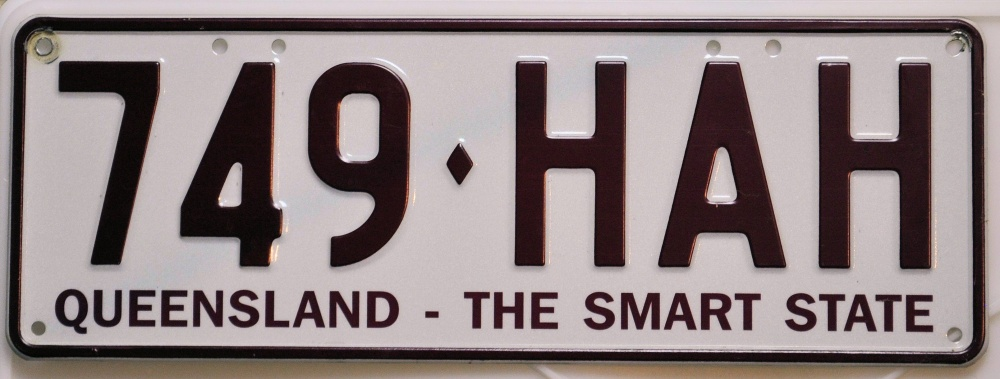
Queensland number plate from 2001 with the optional slogan, which was available from 2001 to 2013.

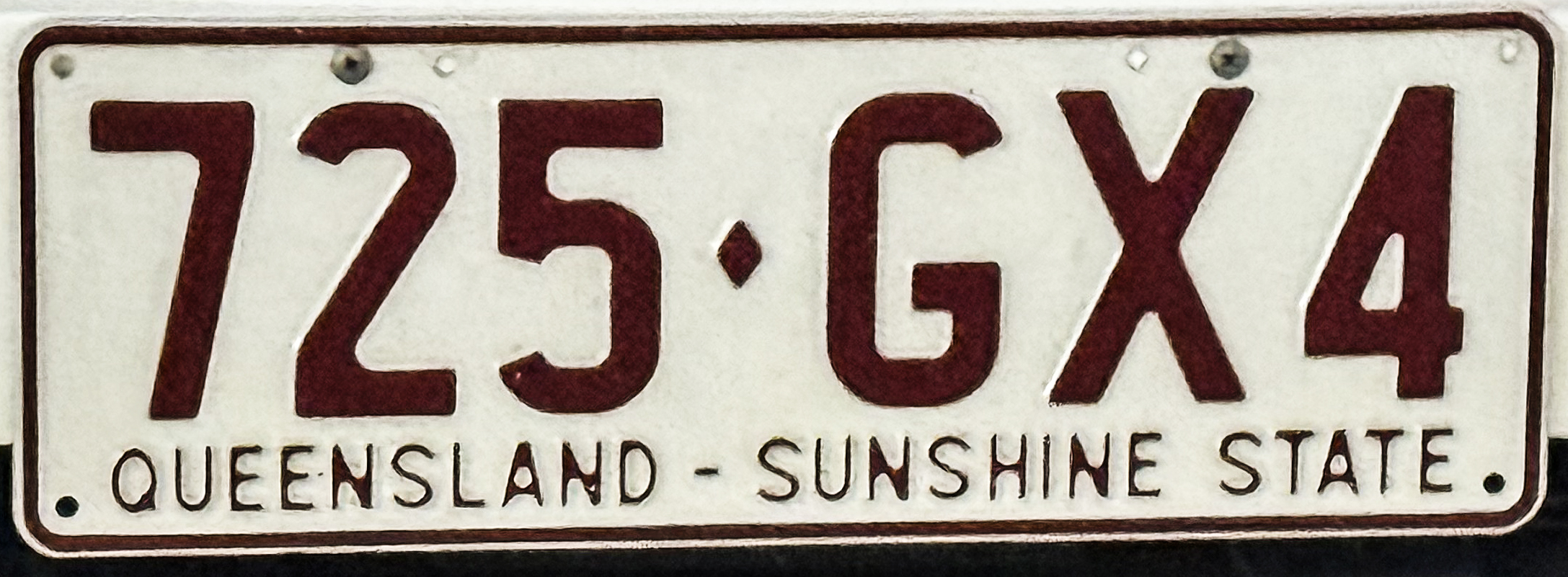
Queensland number plate from 2020 with new sequence.

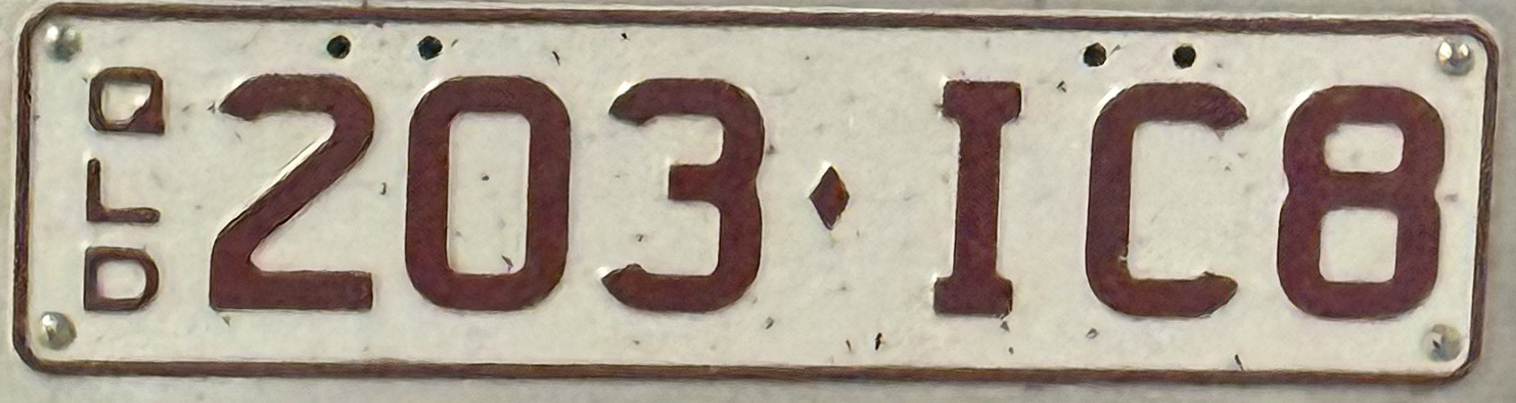
Slimline Queensland number plate

In October 2001, Premier Peter Beattie announced that the state would be switching to maroon-on-white plates embossed with the slogan Queensland – The Smart State. The Premier stated that idea for the change came from a member of the public. This was to demonstrate the state government's efforts to promote education, research and development within Queensland. Due to backlash from tourism operators and the public, Beattie rescinded his decision on 30 October, instead allowing motorists to select between either the old or new slogans with maroon text. However, it adopted as policy that all government owned motor vehicles, including privately plated vehicles use The Smart State slogan, except where the Premier otherwise agrees. The first of the new maroon plates were manufactured on 14 November 2001. This started at 000·GKK for the Sunshine State plates and 000·HAA for The Smart State versions. The Smart State slogan was allocated the combinations 000·HAA to 999·HFU, 000·HOY to 999·HQQ, 000·HRU to 999·HRU, 000·HUM to 999·HUM, 000·JAA to 999·JDZ, 000·JKA to 999·JKT, 000·KAA to 999·KAZ, 000·KFA to 999·KGK, 000·KOA to 999·KPD, 000·KWS to 999·KXG, 000·LFA to 999·LFU, 000·LOA to 999·LOZ, 000·LZI to 999·LZZ, and 000·MAA to 999·MFM. All others have Sunshine State slogans.

In late May 2010, after 999·MZZ was reached, the series skipped to 000·RAA, due to standard-issue plates in the 000·NAA to 999·PZZ remaining in circulation, and 000·QAA to 999·QZZ combinations being used and reserved for large trailers and government vehicles.

On 22 April 2012, the recently elected Newman Government announced that it would stop manufacturing The Smart State plates as a cost-cutting measure, noting that nine out of 10 customers chose the Sunshine State slogan.

Starting on 19 August 2013, limited edition Queenslander! – 8 in a Row slogan plates starting at 000·UAA were issued to celebrate the recent eighth consecutive State of Origin win for Queensland.

In July 2014, when the combination 999·TZZ was reached, the 000·UAA to 999·UZZ series were skipped, recommencing from 000·VAA. The U-series plates are reserved for large trailers and special applications, such as the limited edition Queenslander! – 8 in a Row plates.

On 1 July 2018, the Queensland Government announced that it was revealed that after general issue 999-ZZZ the following combinations will be issued:

- new series of three numbers, two letters and one number, e.g. 123·AB4

On 1 September 2020, new series started from 001·AA2 as 000·AA2 was given away as a prize by the department. "0" and "1" will not be used in the last position in the new series as it would be mistaken with the letter "O" and letter “I” from the previous series.

Skipped combinations: 000·MGA to 999·MPZ, 093·UAG to 999·UAZ (000·UAA to 092·UAG was issued) and 000·OO2 to 999·OO9.

As of 6 September 2024, new Sequential black series were released as 000·A2A onwards rather than relying on the current maroon series. Available throughout Queensland car dealers.

== General series allocations ==
General issue combinations at the start of each year (cars and trucks)
1920	1921	1922	1923	1924	1925	1926	1927	1928	1929
	1	8183	13923	21435	32725	47-921	67-736	86-510	104-716
1930	1931	1932	1933	1934	1935	1936	1937	1938	1939
124-796	139-537	151-573	163-579	177-046	195-315	216-215	237-583	260-535	287-229
1940	1941	1942	1943	1944	1945	1946	1947	1948	1949
312-856	333-260	346-729	361-621	378-114	390-354	403-309	424-986	442-332	460-952
1950	1951	1952	1953	1954	1955	1956	1957	1958	1959
483-075	521-343	557-852	588-328	625-197	669-282	NBF-197	NDA-670	NEZ-692	NHA-910
1960	1961	1962	1963	1964	1965	1966	1967	1968	1969
NJG-670	NLS-506	NNO-171	NPR-657	NSG-996	NVG-939	NYC-701	PDR-090	PGW-305	PJT-702
1970	1971	1972	1973	1974	1975	1976	1977	1978	1979
PNU-047	PRL-753	PVN-554	PZZ-016	OEY-670	OJY-803	OPL-103	OWV-938	012-NDI	452-NJU
1980	1981	1982	1983	1984	1985	1986	1987	1988	1989
913·NQY	400·NYA	100·OEH	800·OOT	000·OWR	000·PEM	000·PNB	300·PUB	000·ABJ	000·AJN
1990	1991	1992	1993	1994	1995	1996	1997	1998	1999
000·ATF	000·BCK	000·BLJ	000·BVQ	000·CKA	000·CUV	920·DGE	000·DSA	000·EMT	000·EWA
2000	2001	2002	2003	2004	2005	2006	2007	2008	2009
000·FJA	000·FXA	000·GNA	000·HKA	000·ICA	000·ILA	000·JFA	000·KBA	000·KWI	000·LTA
2010	2011	2012	2013	2014	2015	2016	2017	2018	2019
000·MUA	000·RFC	000·SAW	000·SUU	000·TRM	000·VIB	000·WDA	000·WYM	000·XVA	000·YRC
2020	2021	2022	2023	2024	2025	2026	2027	2028	2029
000·ZLM	000·AZ9	000·DS2	000·GE8	000·JC4	000·MB2	000·PC2			

* Note: Registration numbers recorded until 1988 are of those issued by Head Office (including Spring Hill). Registration numbers shown from 1988 are approximate. The requirement for a "dash" (-) before the last three digits was introduced in 1925. From 2003 until 2012 motorists were offered a choice of slogans; 'SUNSHINE STATE" or "SMART STATE". This led to, for example, a number plate 000-HFK with the "SMART STATE" slogan, being issued on the same day as a number plate 000-IGZ with the "SUNSHINE STATE" slogan.

- Motorcycle: 1955 to 1975 NA·000 to QZ·999 in white on black base then reissued from 1973 to 1975. In 1975 it changed to 000·NA and completed the run at 999·QZ in December 1980. It changed back to aa-nnn beginning at AA-000 in green on reflective white. From January 2002, it changed to Maroon on white at UK·000 then the run was completed in October 2006. Since 2006 it is in 000-Aa format commencing at 000·AA and in September 2015, Transport & Main Roads has confirmed that 000·NA to 999·QZ cancelled white on blacks are being reissued in maroon on white before it can move to 000-Ra range. As of December 2017, the embossed QLD legend has been updated in an enlarged QLD state identifier starting at 000-QQ. As of August 2023, the Registration plates started with a new format starting at 2AA-00.
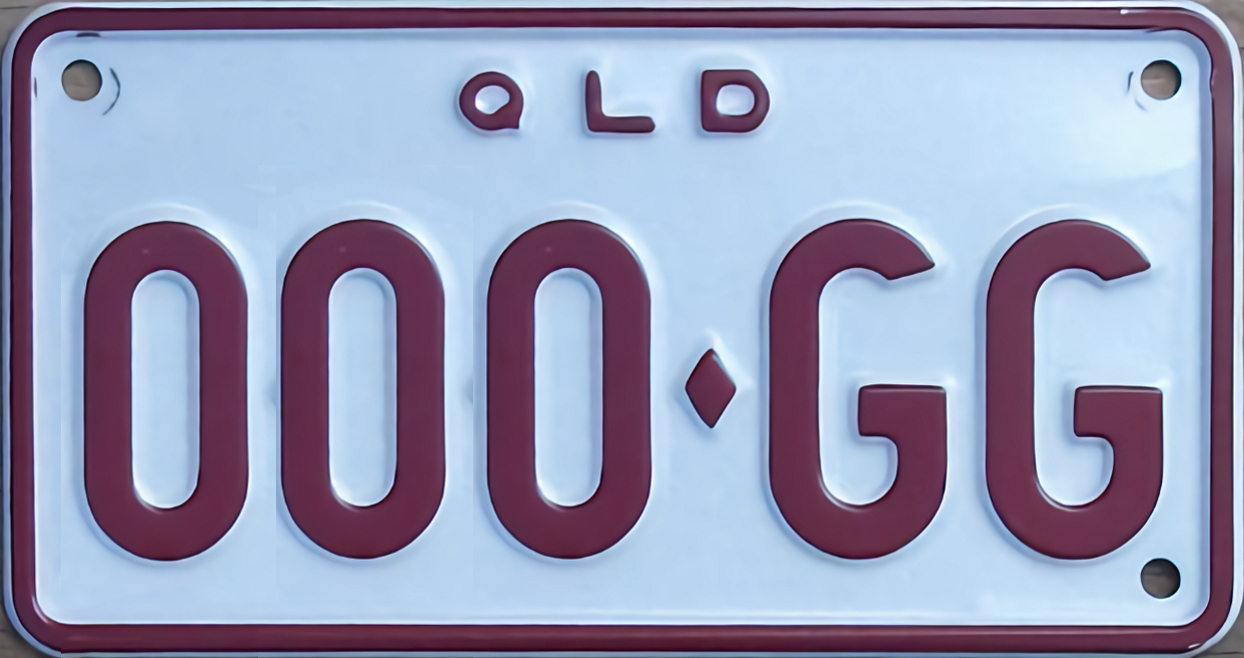
  Queensland motorcycle registration plate
- Trailer: Up to 1955 the trailer has a Q/Tnnn-nnn format in white on black base (with QT in reverse B&W). From 1955, the format was from NTA·000 to NTZ·999. In 1963 the blocks were recalled and replaced by two type formats the smaller trailer format from QZ•9999 to OA•0000 in white on black base, changing from 1988 to white on reflective green base from OK onwards. in 1993 the format began at AA•0000 and the 2001 changeover to Maroon on reflective white occurred in the BI•0000 series and now is in the G series. The standard size format for larger trailers in white on black runs from QVA•000 to QZZ•999 running from 1963 to 1988. In 1988 it switched to green on reflective white starting at 000•QAA then the 2002 change to maroon in the 000•QHP series and now in 000•QZZ range. As of 20 May 2015, 000•UBA was allocated onwards for new issues.

== Other vehicles ==
- QG prefix state government QG◆AA00

State Government-owned vehicles' plates have the format QGa·nnn from 1955 to 1980 in white on black base then in an interim arrangement in 1979 allocated QHA until the Bjelke-Petersen government made a clear decision, to issue newer plates from May 1980 using nnn-QGa.

1955 – 1980 – QGA·000
1980 – 1989 – 000·QGA
1989 – 1993 – QGA·000
1993 – 1999 – 000·QGA
1993 – 2002 – QGA·000
2002 – 2007 – 000·QGA
2007 –Current – QG◆AA00

Previously, State Government vehicles bear the "Smart State" slogan ("QG", of course, standing for "Queensland Government"). As of October 2012 QG plates have moved to the Sunshine State slogan starting from QG·KA01. Government trailer format in both reverse formats are QZA·QZZ and smaller trailer as QG. They are no longer issued. Queensland Fire and Emergency Services fire equipment have plates in the series nnnn·QF, QF being an abbreviation of Queensland Fire and nnnn being the appliance's fleet number, padded to 4 digits where necessary.

Between 1955 and 1991 ambulance vehicles in Queensland were registered with plates in the series QAV·000 to QAY·199.

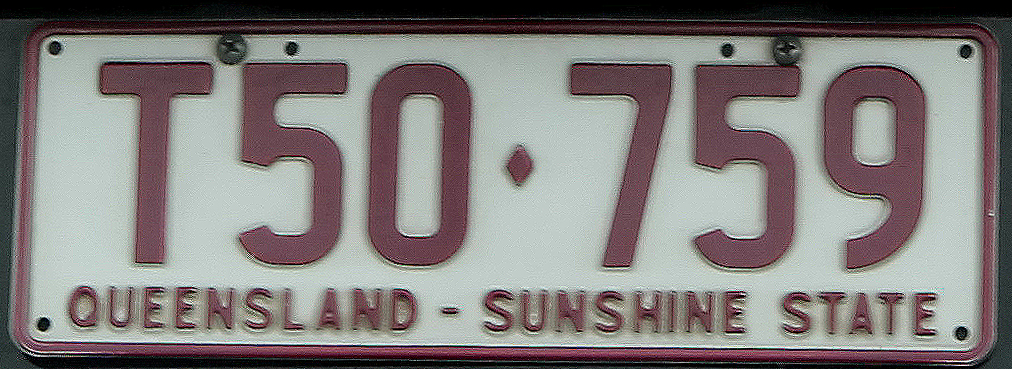
Taxicab

There are many special blocks of plates allocated to different vehicles with specific uses:

- Tnn·nnn for taxis- Previously in white on green base both non reflective and reflective until from 1961 to 2002. In current maroon on reflective white.
- nnnnCn for limited-use vehicles (mainly roadworks equipment and golf buggies). These plates began at C·00001. When C·99999 was reached it was followed by 00000·C. In 2021 once 99999·C was reached, 0000·C0 was introduced with the issuing sequence of 9999·C0 being followed by 0000·C1.
- L·nnnnn for limousines – QUEENSLAND LIMOUSINE embossed legend. Currently not issuing new plates.
- F·nnnnn or 1A·nnn for farm vehicles
- S·nnnnn for special interest or historical vehicles (registered concessionally if they are not to be used as regular transport)
- CC·000 for consular staff vehicles. CONSULAR CORPS screened legend, which has since been amended to show QLD-CONSULAR CORPS.
- D2·A00 QLD-DEALER TRADE It is a new Dealer Trade plate in a bike rack size introduced in October 2015 replacing the two lined square QLD - Limited Use that has a top label space, introduced in January 2000 starting in green then later in maroon. As of 2026, it as reached DZ·999 so moved to D2·A00. From 1976 to 1999 the format was in annual colours as D92 1000 being the year after the D prefix. Between 1962 and 1976 dealers were in D1-234 and E1-234 blocks. 1958 to 1962 was in N-123 and P-123 on a square base with large QLD embossing at top. Prior to 1958 it has QD-1234 blocks.

== Personalised plates ==
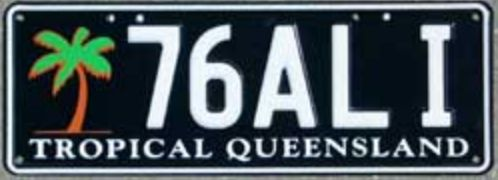
Tropical Queensland personalised plate

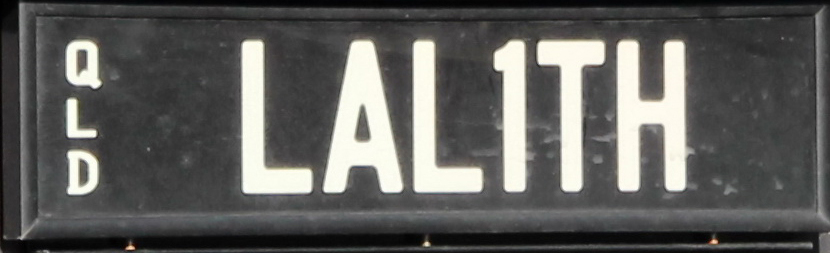
Queensland personalised plate

PPQ – Personalised Plates Queensland is a personalised plate product of the Queensland Transport and Main Roads Department and they have a dedicated website in use.

Queensland motorists have a choice of nearly 100 different types of personalised plates. Personalised plates are very popular amongst Queenslanders and often sell for a premium via classifieds or various online portals such as eBay.

In addition, PPQ offers customers 'retro' plates, which are essentially general-issue plates that may be retained if customers change vehicles. As vintage general issue 'Q' plates, white-on-black plates and green-on-white plates will eventually attract a relatively high price among classic car collectors and restorers, PPQ has made retro plates essentially non-transferable; that is, they may be attached to many different vehicles, but the listed owner(s) must stay the same with each registration and can only be transferred to direct relations.

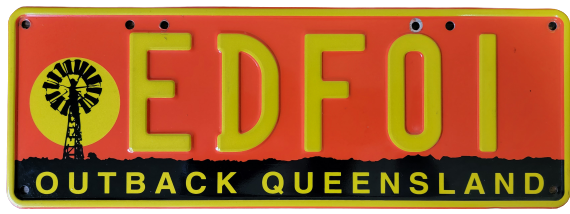
Outback Queensland personalised plate

Formats used are nn-aaa, aaa-nn, nnn-aaa or aaa-nnn, and later in mixed formats i.e. A1BT23 Qaa-nnZ and Qaa-nnY (for Euro combinations) and custom combinations as cccccc. 7-letter combinations are auctioned off from time to time and for limited periods between 2007 and 2009, PPQ made 7-letter combinations available for sale online.

- Prior to 1998 Main Roads Department and later Transport Queensland commenced selling graphic plates from 1979 and expanded into current graphics Qld range during 1993.
- PPQ established in 1998
- September 2010 – PPQ released 7 letter/number combinations that were not already issued for a limited period of 7 days at the fixed price of $2995 but by 2012 it is now permanent.
- November 2010 – PPQ launched the Q Signature Series plates: Qaann
- March 2011 – PPQ launched the NRL footy plates range covering all of these NRL teams and incorporates Qld based NRL teams.

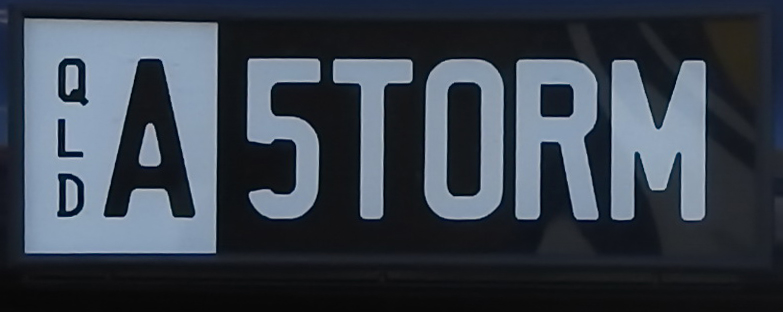
A signature series

- October 2012 – PPQ launched the A Plate Series: Aaaaaa retailed from $2,500. Now updated in 2017 to a plain all white on black with square border on A character.
- June 2018 – Zodiac plates have been dropped from sale. Last day was 30 June 2018.
- November 2018 – Some of NRL plates have had team colours changed such as Brisbane Broncos.
- February 2019 – Emoji plates were introduced and later expanded to other emojis.
- 8 October 2019 – Customised slogan coloured plates launched.
- February 2020 – JDM (Japanese Domestic Market) plates introduced, similar style as NSW does.

== Discontinued plates ==
- Tractor series: A1·999 Issued from the 1950s then the final colour shown as M1·000 until replaced in the 1990s by A·0000. Replaced by the current tractor series.
- P annual plates series: P1·0000 P yearly permit plates was issued in the 1990s, but was discontinued.
- Hire car series: PVH·000 Issued from the 1960s, then the final colour shown from 1984 000·PVH until replaced by the current L-series in 1993.
- SL·00·BC for Special Purpose limousines – QUEENSLAND LIMOUSINE embossed legend. Discontinued as it also been discontinued from new issues.
- PPQ plate products: discontinued in 2014 were The Simpsons and Hello Kitty as the licence to use these characters was not renewed. Zodiac Plates 30 Jun 2018.
