= Criminal Law (Criminal Organisations Disruption) Amendment Act 2013 =

Criminal Law (Criminal Organisations Disruption) Amendment Act 2013, was an act of the Parliament of Queensland introduced with a package of legislation aiming to combat "illegal activities of criminal gangs, including criminal [motorcycle] gangs."

The act was passed on 16 October 2013, and received Royal Assent on 17 October 2013. In 2016 it was repealed as part of the introduction of the Serious and Organised Crime Amendment Bill .

== Acts amended ==
The Act amended various existing criminal laws, including the Bail Act, 1980; the Crime and Misconduct Act, 2001; the Criminal Code; the Penalties and Sentences Act, 1992; the Police Powers and Responsibilities Act, 2000; the Tow Truck Act, 1973 (for particular purposes); and the Crime and Misconduct Regulation, 2005 (for particular purposes). The wide coverage of the Act prompted public criticism, and an (unsuccessful) High Court challenge.

== Prescribed criminal organizations and places ==
The Act declared a list of motorcycle gangs to be 'outlaw motorcycle gangs' and therefore banned under the legislation, including:

- Bandidos
- Black Uhlans
- Coffin Cheaters
- Comancheros
- Finks
- Fourth Reich
- Gladiators
- Gypsy Jokers
- Hells Angels
- Highway 61
- Iron Horsemen
- Life and Death
- Lone Wolf
- Milky Boys
- Mobshitters
- Mongols
- Muslim Brotherhood Movement
- Nomads
- Notorious
- Odins Warriors
- Outcasts
- Outlaws
- Phoenix
- Rebels
- Red Devils
- Renegades
- Scorpions

In addition, the Act declared "prescribed places" that fell within its remit, although police subsequently admitted that the list was a 'living document' and subject to change.

== See also ==
- Vicious Lawless Association Disestablishment Act 2013
- Tattoo Parlours Act 2013
- List of outlaw motorcycle clubs
- Gangs in Australia
