= Vicious Lawless Association Disestablishment Act 2013 =

Act of the Parliament of Queensland

Parliament of Queensland

The Vicious Lawless Association Disestablishment Act 2013 was an act of the Parliament of Queensland, enacted to "severely punish members of criminal organisations that commit serious offences". The act aimed to "come down harshly on outlaw motorcycle gangs and their members" and was one of three passed in the same session on 16 October 2013, going into effect immediately. The associated acts enacted on the same date were the Criminal Law (Criminal Organisations Disruption) Amendment Act 2013 and the Tattoo Parlours Act 2013.

The act was repealed in 2016, with the passing of the Serious and Organised Crime Legislation Amendment Act 2016.

== Stipulations ==
The act applies to legal organisations and "any other group of 3 or more persons by whatever name called, whether associated formally or informally and whether the group is legal or illegal." Similarly it defines office bearer of the organisation to allow for informal roles, with the defendant required to prove that they are not an office bearer.

The act declares a person to be a "vicious lawless associate" if they commit a serious offence "for the purposes of, or in the course of participating in the affairs of, the relevant association". It is incumbent on the defendant to prove that the association is "an association whose members do not have as their purpose" the serious offences listed in the act. If a person is declared to be a "vicious lawless associate", this Act mandates a further 15 years imprisonment on top of the sentence for the crime for members of the organisation, and 10 years imprisonment in addition to this for office bearers of the organisation.

Specific declared offences of the act include parts from the following Acts that are deemed to be 'serious offences' for the purpose of the act:

- the Corrective Services Act 2006 (1 offence);
- the Criminal Code (Queensland) (59 offences);
- the Criminal Proceeds Confiscation Act 2002 (1 offence);
- the Drugs Misuse Act 1986 (5 offences); and
- the Weapons Act 1990 (5 offences).

== Criticism ==
At the time of its introduction the bill attracted a large amount of criticism from law professionals to Amnesty International. In particular, the bill was criticised by Amnesty International for sweeping so broadly that innocent conduct may be caught and infringing the right to be presumed innocent until proven guilty.

A later official taskforce was established in June 2015 to conduct a review of the suite of legislation introduced in 2013 to combat organised crime, in particular outlaw motorcycle gangs (OMCGs). Among many other criticisms, it noted that:

"The QPS reports that, overall, 202 individual persons have been charged with criminal offences as a vicious lawless associate. Of those 202 persons, 36 were identified as either members (21) or associates (15) of an OMCG. That figure of 36 people, importantly, includes ex-members who disassociated from their OMCG throughout that period, and ex associates. The remaining 166 individuals are not known to be members or associates of an OMCG. Hence OMCG members make up no more than 17.8% of all offenders charged under the VLAD Act..."

== See also ==
- Criminal Law (Criminal Organisations Disruption) Amendment Act 2013
- Tattoo Parlours Act 2013
