= Tattoo Parlours Act 2013 =

Parliament of Queensland

The Tattoo Parlours Act 2013 is an anti-gang, anti-crime act of the Parliament of Queensland to establish a regulatory framework, including occupational licensing, for the tattoo industry in Queensland, Australia. The associated acts enacted on the same date were the Criminal Law (Criminal Organisations Disruption) Amendment Act 2013 and the Vicious Lawless Association Disestablishment Act 2013. The acts were passed on 16 October 2013, and as of 17 October 2013, the Attorney-General of Queensland had indicated that they had received royal assent; part 9 of Tattoo Parlours Act 2013, which amends the Liquor Act 1992, came into force at that time. The rest of this act was to commence "on a day fixed by proclamation."

The relevant Minister is required to review the act after three years.

== Stipulations ==
The act places restrictions on who can hold a permit, including a requirement that the holder must be an Australian citizen over the age of 18, and must not be a "controlled person" as defined by the Criminal Organisation Act 2009. It requires permit applicants to provide fingerprints and palm prints.

The act amends the Liquor Act 1992, in particular, to prohibit patrons from wearing or displaying material associated with criminal motor cycle gangs, such as club jackets, while in liquor licensed premises. It also amends the Police Powers and Responsibilities Act 2000 to expand the use of detection dogs in tattoo parlours from drug detection to include explosives detection.

== See also ==
- Vicious Lawless Association Disestablishment Act 2013
- Criminal Law (Criminal Organisations Disruption) Amendment Act 2013
