= Victor Peirce =

Australian criminal (1958–2002)

- Born: 11 November 1958; Australia
- Died: 1 May 2002 (aged 43); Port Melbourne, Victoria, Australia
- Occupations: Waterside worker, drug trafficker
- Spouse: Wendy Peirce
- Children: 5
- Parent(s): William George "Billy" Peirce and Kath Pettingill
- Status: Murdered
- Conviction: Drug trafficking
- Penalty: 6 years' imprisonment

Victor George Peirce (11 November 1958 – 1 May 2002) was an Australian gangster from Melbourne, Victoria. Peirce was a member of the Pettingill family, which was headed by matriarch and former Richmond brothel owner Kath Pettingill.

== Walsh Street police shootings ==
In 2005, Peirce's widow, Wendy Peirce gave an interview to Australian media detailing how her husband planned and carried out the 1988 Walsh Street police shootings, a crime for which he was acquitted by jury along with three accomplices after she failed to give truthful evidence in court.

== Death ==
Peirce was shot dead in a car parked opposite the Coles supermarket in Bay St, Port Melbourne on 1 May 2002.

His funeral was held on 9 May 2002, at the Saint Peter and Paul's Parish Church in South Melbourne. Father Bob Maguire conducted the service. Peirce was later buried at the Altona Memorial Park. Present was Jason Moran, former running mate of slain gangster Alphonse Gangitano. Moran was a suspect in the murder of Gangitano, who was shot dead in his Templestowe home on 16 January 1998.

On 22 June 2007, Victoria Police arrested Faruk Orman in the western suburb of Sunshine, alleging he was the driver for Peirce's killers.

In September 2007 Vince Benvenuto—brother of Frank Benvenuto, an underworld identity reputedly under the protection of Victor Peirce and murdered May 2000—was arrested for drug trafficking. The Age reported that when asked whether he was arrested as a result of the Purana investigation, police replied: "He's a suspect in relation to the murder of Victor Peirce." But it was hitman Andrew "Benji" Veniamin who shot Pierce dead. Veniamin claimed "If I don't get Victor he'll get me first". An unnamed man who drove Veniamin to the killing was found guilty of the murder in September 2009 and was sentenced in November 2009 to a minimum of 14 years in prison, which took into account more than two years he had already been in custody; in 2013 it was revealed that it was Orman. However, Orman's conviction was quashed in 2019, due to miscarriages of justice by his former lawyer and notorious police informant Nicola Gobbo. Veniamin was later killed in 2004 by Domenic "Mick" Gatto. Gatto told the court that it was in self-defence, and was acquitted by a jury.

== In television ==
In 2008, he was portrayed by actor Andrew Gilbert in the series Underbelly. He was also portrayed in the 2011 Australian television series Killing Time.
