= Equity Ensemble Awards =

Australian awards system

The Equity Ensemble Awards (or Equity Awards) are an Australian awards system, that is an accolade presented by The Equity Foundation, the performers branch of the Media, Entertainment and Arts Alliance (MEAA). The awards have been presented annually since 2011, and are awarded to a cast in a television drama series, comedy series and television movie or miniseries. The awards are peer voted, via a secret ballot, by members of the Equity Foundation. In addition to these categories, the foundation also presents a lifetime achievement award, which has been presented since 2009.

== Award categories ==
=== Competitive ===
==== Most Outstanding Performance by an Ensemble in a Comedy Series ====
In the following list, winners are listed first and highlighted in a separate colour, in boldface; those not highlighted or in boldface are the nominees. The years listed are of when the television program first aired in Australia; the awards are presented the year after.

Year	Performers	Program	Series	Network
**2010** (1st)
**2010** (1st)	**Heidi Arena**, **Stephen Ballantyne**, **Keith Brockett**, **Robyn Butler**, **Victoria Eagger**, **Bob Franklin**, **Justin Hamilton**, **Roz Hammond**, **Fiona Harris**, **Wayne Hope**, **Tony Moclair** and **Nicole Nabout**	**The Librarians**	—N/a	ABC
**2010** (1st)	Amanda Brotchie, Beth Buchanan, Susie Dee, Paul Denny, Dailan Evans, Kim Gyngell, Anna Jennings-Edquist, Rebecca Massey, Geoffrey Rush, Martin Sharpe, Raj Sidhu, Cindy Waddingham and Adam Zwar	Lowdown	—N/a	ABC
**2010** (1st)	Adrian Bernotti, Amanda Bishop, Anthony Hayes, Phil Lloyd, Eddie Nehl and Ivy Nehl	Review with Myles Barlow	—N/a	ABC2
**2010** (1st)	Jason Gann, Cindy Waddingham and Adam Zwar	Wilfred	—N/a	SBS One
**2011** (2nd)
**2011** (2nd)	**Joel Barker**, **Jonathan Biggins**, **Amanda Bishop**, **Peter Carmody**, **Jack Dawes**, **Michael Denkha**, **Al Dukes**, **Drew Forsythe**, **Phil Lloyd**, **Paul McCarthy**, **Craig McLachlan**, **Georgina Naidu**, **Wildenfox Pavarotti**, **Jim Russell** and **Jack Versace**	**At Home With Julia**	—N/a	ABC1
**2011** (2nd)	Chris Lilley (who acted the entire ensemble: Daniel and Nathan Sims, S.mouse, Jen Okazaki, Gran and Blake Oakfield)	Angry Boys	—N/a	ABC1
**2011** (2nd)	Alison Bell, Abe Forsythe, Celia Pacquola, Toby Truslove	Laid	—N/a	ABC1
**2011** (2nd)	Christian Barratt-Hill, Travis Cotton, Ben Geurens, Deborah Kennedy, Mick Molloy, Susie Porter, Andrew Ryan and Emily Taheny	The Jesters	—N/a	Movie Extra
**2011** (2nd)	Hamish Blake, Jasna Harriss-Currie, Leah de Niese, Laura Gordon, Jess Harris, Simon Russell and Josh Schmidt	Twentysomething	—N/a	ABC2
**2012** (3rd)
**2012** (3rd)	**Ian Meadows, Patrick Brammall, Jane Harber, Danny Adcock, Tina Bursill, Rachel Gordon, Phil Lloyd, Darren Gilshenan** and **Guy Edmonds**	**A Moody Christmas**	—N/a	ABC1
**2012** (3rd)	Alison Bell, Celia Pacquola, Abe Forsythe, Toby Truslove and Damon Herriman	Laid	—N/a	ABC1
**2012** (3rd)	Adam Zwar, Paul Denny, Beth Buchanan, Dailan Evans and Kim Gyngell	Lowdown	—N/a	ABC1
**2012** (3rd)	Christine Anu, Ben Gerrard, Paul Ireland, Adam Richard and Toby Truslove	Outland	—N/a	ABC1
**2012** (3rd)	Frank Woodley, Justine Clarke, Tom Long and Alexandra Cashmere	Woodley	—N/a	ABC1
**2013** (4th)
**2013** (4th)	**Dougie Baldwin, Michala Banas, Patrick Brammall, Harrison Feldman, Maddy Jevic, Robyn Malcolm, Annie Maynard, Rhys Mitchell, Robyn Nevin, Glenn Robbins** and **Lara Robinson**	**Upper Middle Bogan**	Series 1	ABC1
**2013** (4th)	Wade Briggs, Judi Farr, Andrew S. Gilbert, Debra Lawrence, Renee Lim, David Roberts, Caitlin Stasey, Josh Thomas and Thomas Ward	Please Like Me	Series 1	ABC2
**2013** (4th)	Hamish Blake, Leah de Niesse, Jess Harris, Simon Russell and Josh Schmidt	Twentysomething	Series 2	ABC2

==== Most Outstanding Performance by an Ensemble in a Drama Series ====
In the following list, winners are listed first and highlighted in a separate colour, in boldface; those not highlighted or in boldface are the nominees. The years listed are of when the television program first aired in Australia; the awards are presented the year after.

Year	Performers	Program	Series	Network
**2010** (1st)
**2010** (1st)	**Kate Box**, **Caroline Brazier**, **Richard Carter**, **Danielle Cormack**, **Matt Day**, **Russell Dykstra**, **Keegan Joyce**, **Steve Le Marquand**, **Geoff Morrell**, **Adrienne Pickering** and **Richard Roxburgh**	**Rake**	—N/a	ABC1
**2010** (1st)	Kerry Armstrong, Julia Blake, Richard Davies, Susie Dee, Kaarin Fairfax, Janet Foye, Andrew S. Gilbert, Caroline Gillmer, Jay Laga'aia, HaiHa Le, Amanda Ma, Frank Magree, Lawrence Mah, Hanna Mangan-Lawrence, Cameron McKenzie, Dina Panozza, Tim Phillipps, Philip Quast, Charles Tingwell and Gareth Yuen	Bed of Roses	—N/a	ABC1
**2010** (1st)	Linda Cropper, Richard Davies, Alicia Gardner, Don Hany, Jane Harber, Lachy Hulme, Asher Keddie, Deborah Mailman, Eddie Perfect, Kat Stewart and John Waters	Offspring	—N/a	Network Ten
**2010** (1st)	Michael Caton, Ryan Corr, Rebecca Gibney, George Houvardas, Gillian Jones, Jessica Marais, Angus McLaren, Hugh Sheridan, James Stewart, Erik Thomson and Zoe Ventoura	Packed to the Rafters	—N/a	Seven Network
**2010** (1st)	Mitch Bartlett, Emma Booth, Dieter Brummer, Rob Carlton, Cheree Cassidy, Salvatore Coco, Caroline Craig, Natasha Cunningham, Firass Dirani, Damien Garvey, Michael Gittany, Diarmid Heidenreich, John Lahoud, Dan Mor, Tom O'Sullivan, Daniel Roberts, Waddah Sari, Peter Scarf, John Seru, Hazem Shammas, Paul Tassone, Sigrid Thornton and Wil Traval	Underbelly: The Golden Mile	—N/a	Nine Network
**2011** (2nd)
**2011** (2nd)	**Daniela Farinacci**, **Aaron Fa'aoso**, **Don Hany**, **Renee Lim**, **Matt Nable**, **Susie Porter** and **Tasneem Roc**	**East West 101**	—N/a	SBS One
**2011** (2nd)	Kerry Armstrong, Julia Blake, Kaarin Fairfax, Andrew S. Gilbert, Caroline Gillmer, Jay Laga'aia, HaiHa Le, Frank Magree, Hanna Mangan-Lawrence, Matt Levett and Cameron McKenzie	Bed of Roses	—N/a	ABC1
**2011** (2nd)	Jeanette Cronin, Andrea Demetriades, Marta Dusseldorp, Jerome Ehlers, Indiana Evans, Lewis Fitz-Gerald, Chantelle Jamieson, Peter Kowitz, Todd Lasance, Daniel Lissing, Ella Scott Lynch, Hamish Michael, Christopher Morris and Paul Moxey	Crownies	—N/a	ABC1
**2011** (2nd)	Linda Cropper, Richard Davies, Alicia Gardner, Jane Harber, Lachy Hulme, Asher Keddie, Matt Le Nevez, Deborah Mailman, Eddie Perfect, Kat Stewart and John Waters	Offspring	—N/a	Network Ten
**2011** (2nd)	Michael Caton, Ryan Corr, Merridy Eastman, Rebecca Gibney, George Houvardas, Jessica Marais, Hannah Marshall, Angus McLaren, Hugh Sheridan, James Stewart and Erik Thomson	Packed to the Rafters	—N/a	Seven Network
**2012** (3rd)
**2012** (3rd)	**Wayne Blair, Lisa Flanagan, Deborah Mailman, Aaron McGrath, Kelton Pell, Leah Purcell, Tessa Rose, Shari Sebbens** and **Ursula Yovich**	**Redfern Now**	Series 1	ABC1
**2012** (3rd)	Richard Bligh, Hugo Johnstone-Burt, Ashleigh Cummings, Essie Davis, Tammy MacIntosh, Travis McMahon, Nathan Page, Ruby Rees-Wemyss and Anthony Sharpe	Miss Fisher's Murder Mysteries	Season one	ABC1
**2012** (3rd)	Linda Cropper, Richard Davies, Alicia Gardner, Lachy Hulme, Asher Keddie, Matt Le Nevez, Deborah Mailman, Eddie Perfect, Kat Stewart and John Waters	Offspring	Season three	Network Ten
**2012** (3rd)	Charlotte Best, Isabelle Cornish, Rodger Corser, Ashleigh Cummings, Dylan Goodearl, Brenna Harding, Reef Ireland, Claudia Karvan, Jeremy Lindsay-Taylor, Ed Oxenbould, Susie Porter, Susan Prior and Dan Wyllie	Puberty Blues	Series 1	Network Ten
**2012** (3rd)	Kate Box, Caroline Brazier, Danielle Cormack, Matt Day, Russell Dykstra, Keegan Joyce, Steve Le Marquand, Robyn Malcolm, Damien McGarvey Adrienne Pickering and Richard Roxburgh	Rake	Series 2	ABC1
**2013** (4th)
**2013** (4th)	**Wayne Blair, Tammy Clarkson Jones, Ernie Dingo, Lisa Flanagan, Noni Hazlehurst, Miah Madden, Kirk Page, Caren Pistorius, Saskia Williscroft, Meyne Wyatt** and **Ursula Yovich**	**Redfern Now**	Series 1	ABC1
**2013** (4th)	Marta Dusseldorp, Noni Hazlehurst, Brett Climo, Craig Hall, David Berry, Arianwen Parkes-Lockwood, Abby Earl, Aldo Mignone and Frankie J. Holden	A Place to Call Home	Series 1	Seven Network
**2013** (4th)	Rick Donald, Nadine Garner, Craig McLachlan, Joel Tobeck, Cate Wolfe and John Wood	The Doctor Blake Mysteries	Series 1	ABC1
**2013** (4th)	Charlie Clausen, Kassandra Clementi, Charles Cottier, Dan Ewing, Rhiannon Fish, Lisa Gormley, Marcus Graham, Demi Harman, Catherine Mack, Robert Mammone, Will McDonald, Lynne McGranger, Ray Meagher, Andrew Morley, Ada Nicodemou, Georgie Parker, Kelly Paterniti, Stephen Peacocke, Johnny Ruffo, Bonnie Sveen, Emily Symons, Samara Weaving, Nic Westaway, Shane Withington and Lincoln Younes	Home and Away	Series 26	Seven Network
**2013** (4th)	Tim Campbell, Firass Dirani, Georgia Flood, Gyton Grantley, Lily Jones, Anna McGahan, Julia Morris, Rhys Muldoon, Edwina Royce, Natalie Saleeba, Gary Sweet and Madeleine West	House Husbands	Series 2	Nine Network
**2013** (4th)	Richard Bligh, Hugo Johnstone-Burt, Ashleigh Cummings, Essie Davis, Travis McMahon, Nathan Page and Anthony Sharpe	Miss Fisher's Murder Mysteries	Series 2	ABC1
**2013** (4th)	Lucy Honigman, Shaun Micallef, Jonny Pasvolsky and Kat Stewart	Mr & Mrs Murder	Series 1	Network Ten
**2013** (4th)	Morgan Baker, Harley Bonner, Ashleigh Brewer, Josef Brown, Stefan Dennis, Rebekah Elmaloglou, Alan Fletcher, Kip Gamblin, Taylor Glockner, Saskia Hampele, Ariel Kaplan, Kate Kendall, Calen Mackenzie, Scott Major, Colette Mann, James Mason, Chris Milligan, Ryan Moloney, Eve Morey, Tom Oliver, Jenna Rosenow, Alin Sumarwata and Jackie Woodburne	Neighbours	Series 28	Eleven
**2013** (4th)	Linda Cropper, Richard Davies, Alicia Gardner, Jane Harber, Lachy Hulme, Kate Jenkinson, Asher Keddie, Matt Le Nevez, Garry McDonald, Eddie Perfect, Caren Pistorius, Kat Stewart and John Waters	Offspring	Series 4	Network Ten
**2013** (4th)	Jacob Allan, Michael Caton, Zoe Cramond, Merridy Eastman, Rebecca Gibney, George Houvardas, Hannah Marshall, Angus McLaren, Ben Mingay Brooke Satchwell and Erik Thomson	Packed to the Rafters	Series 6	Seven Network
**2013** (4th)	Chloe Bayliss, Richard Brancatisano, Matt Day, Susan Hoecke, Justin Holborow, Lisa McCune, Rod Mullinar, Rohan Nichol, Kristof Piechocki, Tasneem Roc and Andrew Ryan	Reef Doctors	Series 1	Network Ten
**2013** (4th)	Pamelyn Chee, Joan Chen, Maeve Dermody, Michael Dorman, Don Hany and Alaric Tay	Serangoon Road	Series 1	ABC
**2013** (4th)	Tony Barry, Cheree Cassidy, Justine Clarke, Stephen Curry, Thomas Fisher, Anita Hegh, Shane Jacobson, Kate Jenkinson, Sue Jones, Claudia Karvan, Elise MacDougall, Frances McGahey, William McInnes, Michelle Vergara-Moore and Damian Walshe-Howling	The Time of Our Lives	Series 1	ABC1
**2013** (4th)	Kate Atkinson, Shareena Clanton, Danielle Cormack, Nicole da Silva, Georgia Flood, Celia Ireland, Aaron Jeffery, Robbie Magasiva, Kris McQuade, Katrina Milosevic and Leeanna Walsman	Wentworth	Series 1	SoHo
**2013** (4th)	Melissa Bergland, Damien Bodie, Virginia Gay, Sarah Grace, Francis Greenslade, Katherine Hicks, Tom Hobbs, PiaGrace Moon, Jack Pearson, Stephen Phillips, Denise Scott, Zoe Tuckwell-Smith, Melanie Vallejo and Tom Wren	Winners & Losers	Series 3	Seven Network
**2013** (4th)	Anna Bamford, Michael Booth, Michael Dorman, Emma Lung, Tracy Mann, Glenn McMillan, Ben Mingay, Peter Phelps, Tim Ross, Brooke Satchwell and Jessica Tovey	Wonderland	Series 1	Network Ten

==== Most Outstanding Performance by an Ensemble in a Television Movie or Miniseries ====
In the following list, winners are listed first and highlighted in a separate colour, in boldface; those not highlighted or in boldface are the nominees. The years listed are of when the television program first aired in Australia; the awards are presented the year after.

Year	Performers	Program	Network
**2011** (2nd)
**2011** (2nd)	**Raffaele Costabile**, **Blake Davis**, **Essie Davis**, **Alex Dimitriades**, **Melissa George**, **Diana Glenn**, **Anthony Hayes**, **Jonathan LaPaglia**, **Sophie Lowe**, **Lex Marinos**, **William McInnes**, **Sophie Okonedo**, **Liberty Townsend** and **Toula Yianni**	**The Slap**	ABC1
**2011** (2nd)	Hugo Johnstone-Burt, Emma Booth, Stephen Curry, Essie Davis, Siobhan Dow-Hall, Kerry Fox, Sean Keenan, Todd Lasance, Shannon Lively, William Mattock, Callan McAuliffe, Sarah McKellar, Geoff Morrell, Grace Ray, Lara Robinson, Tom Russell, Reece Sardelic, Annie Smith, Adam Sollis, Rohnan Tierney, Freya Tingley and Amanda Woodhams	Cloudstreet	Showcase
**2011** (2nd)	John Brumpton, Richard Cawthorne, Louise Crawford, Max Fairchild, Nick Farnell, Colin Friels, Diana Glenn, Steve Hayden, Reef Ireland, Kate Jenkinson, Malcolm Kennard, Kris McQuade, Terry Norris, Martin Sharpe, Robert Taylor, Kerry Walker, Sean Rees-Wemyss, David Wenham and Bethany Whitmore	Killing Time	TV1
**2011** (2nd)	Octavia Barron-Martin, Tony Barry, Rob Carlton, Cheree Cassidy, Matt Day, Maeve Dermody, Robin Goldsworthy, Richard Healy, Charlton Hill, Asher Keddie, Annie Maynard, Ian Meadows, Jessica Tovey, and Rory Williamson	Paper Giants: The Birth of Cleo	ABC1
**2011** (2nd)	John Batchelor, Matt Boesenberg, Richard Brancatisano, Jack Campbell, Khan Chittenden, Danielle Cormack, Caroline Craig, Chelsie Preston Crayford, Rick Donald, Guy Edmonds, Craig Hall, Steve Le Marquand, Anna McGahan, Izzie Stevens, Jeremy Lindsay Taylor, Lucy Wigmore and Felix Williamson	Underbelly: Razor	Nine Network
**2012** (3rd)
**2012** (3rd)	**Mirrah Foulkes**, **Don Hany**, **Anthony Hayes**, **Genevieve Hegney**, **Ewen Leslie** and **Alexandra Schepisi**	**Devil's Dust**	ABC1
**2012** (3rd)	Lachy Hulme, Matthew Le Nevez, Brendan Cowell, Damon Gameau, Abe Forsythe, Cariba Heine and Darryl Brown	Howzat! Kerry Packer's War	Nine Network
**2012** (3rd)	Guy Pearce, Marta Dusseldorp, Aaron Pedersen, Roy Billing, Shane Jacobson, Damien Richardson, Vadim Glowna, Colin Friels, Steve Bisley, Emma Booth, Marshall Napier, Rhys Muldoon, Tottie Goldsmith and Colin Hay	Jack Irish: Bad Debts	ABC1
**2012** (3rd)	Jimi Bani, Deborah Mailman, Colin Friels and Miranda Otto	Mabo	ABC1
**2012** (3rd)	Matt Nable, Jonathan LaPaglia, Ben Winspear, Ella Scott Lynch, Josh Quong Tart, Aaron Jeffery, Jason Montgomery, P.J. Lane, Jodi Gordon and Leeanna Walsman	Underbelly: Badness	Nine Network
**2012** (3rd)	Rachel Griffiths, Callan McAuliffe, Anthony LaPaglia, Alex Williams, Laura Wheelwright, Benedict Samuel and Jordan Raskopoulos	Underground: The Julian Assange Story	Network Ten
**2013** (4th)
**2013** (4th)	**Luke Buchanan**, **Holly Hunter**, **Jacqueline Joe**, **Genevieve Lemon**, **Robyn Malcolm**, **Elisabeth Moss**, **Peter Mullan**, **Robyn Nevin**, **Jay Ryan**, **David Wenham** and **Tom Wright**	**Top of the Lake**	BBC UKTV
**2013** (4th)	Bryan Brown, Marie Bunel, Dan Spielman and Julia Zemiro	An Accidental Soldier	ABC1
**2013** (4th)	Roy Billing, Krew Boylan, Stephen Curry, Gyton Grantley, Morgan Griffin, Kevin Harrington, Joshua Hine, Denise Roberts, Martin Sacks, Joan Sydney and Anne Tenney	Cliffy	ABC1
**2013** (4th)	Lucy Bell, Alexander England, Rob Carlton, Khan Chittenden, Mark Lee, Rachel Griffiths, Mandy McElhinney, Caren Pistorius, Angus Sampson and William Zappa	Paper Giants: Magazine Wars	ABC1
**2013** (4th)	Nicholas Bell, Patrick Brammall, Maeve Dermody, Alan Dukes, Alexander England, Luke Ford, Mirrah Foulkes, Lachy Hulme, Anne Looby, Hamish Michael, Heather Mitchell and David Roberts	Power Games: The Packer-Murdoch War	Nine Network
**2013** (4th)	Amanda Bishop, Nicholas Cassim, Patrick Connolly, Matt Day, Nick Falk, Mirrah Foulkes, Charlie Garber, Darren Gilshenan, Benedict Hardie, Damon Herriman, Rarriwuy Hick, Iain Lang, Kevin Maclsaac, Pip Miller and Paul Stewart	The Outlaw Michael Howe	ABC1
**2013** (4th)	Matt Boesenberg, Richard Cawthorne, Caroline Craig, Jared Daperis, Ian Dixon, Luke Ford, Diana Glenn, Fletcher Humphries, Elise Jansen, Camille Keenan, Nathan Page, Susie Porter, Ken Radley, Dan Wyllie and Ashley Zukerman	Underbelly: Squizzy	Nine Network
**2013** (4th)	David Wenham, Bryan Brown, Claudia Karvan, Remy Hii, Jordan Rodrigues, Sachin Joab, Felino Dolloso and Hien Nguyen	Better Man	SBS One

=== Lifetime Achievement Award ===
- 2009: Peter Carroll
- 2010: Bob Hornery
- 2011: Maggie Dence
- 2012: Ron Haddrick
- 2013: Jill Perryman and Kevan Johnston
- 2014: Toni Lamond
- 2015: Grant Page
- 2016: Anne Phelan
- 2017: Noeline Brown
- 2018: Julia Blake and Terry Norris
- 2019: Lillian Crombie and Ningali Lawford-Wolf

== See also ==
- List of television awards
- Media, Entertainment and Arts Alliance
