= Underbelly (TV series) =

Australian television true crime-drama series

- Genre: Crime drama
- Narrated by: Caroline Craig
- Theme music composer: Burkhard Dallwitz
- Opening theme: "It's a Jungle Out There" by Burkhard Dallwitz
- Ending theme: "It's a Jungle Out There"
- Composer: Burkhard Dallwitz
- Country of origin: Australia
- Original language: English
- No. of series: 7
- No. of episodes: 70 (list of episodes)

Production
- Executive producer: Des Monaghan
- Producers: Greg Haddrick; Brenda Pam
- Running time: 42 minutes
- Production companies: Art Company; Screentime

Original release
- Network: Nine Network
- Release: 14 February 2008 – 4 April 2022

Underbelly is an Australian television true crime-drama series which first aired on the Nine Network between 14 February 2008 and 1 September 2014, before being revived on 3 April 2022. Each series is based on real-life events. There have been six full series, with season 7 being a miniseries. A 2014 series titled Fat Tony & Co is a sequel to the first series but is not branded under the Underbelly title.

== Synopsis ==
The first series is based on the book Leadbelly: Inside Australia's Underworld, by journalists John Silvester and Andrew Rule. The series also borrows the title 'Underbelly' from a previously successful series of 12 true crime compilations by the same authors. Three direct tie-in novels, based on the first three seasons, were also later published by the same authors as part of this series, and a separate 16th book (Underbelly: The Golden Casket) was published in 2010. The fourth series is based on the book Razor by crime author Larry Writer, which was subsequently republished as a tie-in. A fifth tie-in novel, by Andy Muir, was published for the final series. Despite being part of the Underbelly series, the first 12 books have never been republished with the famous Underbelly logo, and the logo was only used from books 13 to 18 (including Golden Casket and the republishing of Razor).

The fifth series, Underbelly: Badness, is based on Sydney underworld figure Anthony "Rooster" Perish, his brother Andrew and their associates. It is set between 2001 and 2012, and broadcast from 13 August 2012. This is the only season that did not receive a 'tie-in' novel.

A sixth series titled Underbelly: Squizzy, based on the events surrounding Joseph "Squizzy" Taylor and set between 1915 and 1927, began airing on 28 July 2013.

Three telemovies called The Underbelly Files aired in 2011. Tell Them Lucifer was Here is about the 1998 murders of Victorian police officers Gary Silk and Rod Miller and the subsequent manhunt for their killers. Infiltration is about the story of Australian police detective Colin McLaren's infiltration of the Calabrian Mafia in Griffith, New South Wales which saw dozens of underworld figures imprisoned The Man Who Got Away tells the story of David McMillian, a drug smuggler and the only Western man to ever escape from Bangkok's Klong Prem Central Prison. All three aired on the Nine Network in February 2011.

In September 2011, a New Zealand version of the series premiered on TV3, titled Underbelly NZ: Land of the Long Green Cloud. The six-part mini-series was the first Underbelly production to be produced and financed outside of Australia. The series detailed events beginning in the late 1960s to and throughout the 1970s and told the origin of the Mr Asia drug syndicate and its original leader Marty Johnstone. The series is somewhat a prequel to the series A Tale of Two Cities. An American version has also been announced on the network channel Starz though nothing else has been confirmed.

== Seasons ==
Series	Subtitle	Episodes	Originally released	
Series	Subtitle	Episodes	First released	Last released
1	Underbelly	13	13 February 2008	7 May 2008
2	A Tale of Two Cities	13	9 February 2009	4 May 2009
3	The Golden Mile	13	11 April 2010	27 June 2010
4	Razor	13	21 August 2011	6 November 2011
5	Badness	8	13 August 2012	1 October 2012
6	Squizzy	8	28 July 2013	1 September 2013
7	Vanishing Act	2	3 April 2022	4 April 2022

=== Underbelly (2008) ===
Season 1 focuses on events in Melbourne which occurred between 1995 and 2004, referred to in the press as the Melbourne gangland killings, in which 36 criminal figures and others were killed, and the transformation of Carl Williams from harmless driver into one of Australia's most notorious drug kingpins.

=== Underbelly: A Tale of Two Cities (2009) ===
Season 2 is a prequel to the first series and focuses on events that occurred in Sydney and Melbourne between the years 1976 to 1987. It was about Griffith, NSW, the cannabis capital of Australia.

=== Underbelly: The Golden Mile (2010) ===
Season 3 is the sequel to A Tale of Two Cities - and hence the prequel to the first series - and focuses on events that stemmed from the Kings Cross nightclub scene in Sydney between the years 1988 to 1996

=== Underbelly: Razor (2011) ===
Season 4 is set in Sydney during the roaring 1920s, when organised crime in Australia began. It's the story of the bloody battle between the era's most feared vice queens, Tilly Devine and her rival Kate Leigh. The series is based on the Ned Kelly Award-winning book Razor, by Larry Writer. The series includes an ensemble cast including actresses Chelsie Preston Crayford and Danielle Cormack portraying Devine and Leigh respectively.

=== Underbelly: Badness (2012) ===
Season 5 is set in modern-day Sydney between 2001–2012 and tells the story of underworld figure Anthony "Rooster" Perish and the efforts of the NSW Police Force's Strike Force Tuno to bring him to justice. The cast includes Jonathan LaPaglia as Anthony Perish, Matt Nable, Ella Scott Lynch, Josh Quong Tart, Aaron Jeffrey, Jason Montgomery, Hollie Andrew, Jodi Gordon, and Leeanna Walsman.

=== Underbelly: Squizzy (2013) ===
Season 6 occurs between 1915 and 1927 in Melbourne and tells the story of one of the city's most notorious criminals, Squizzy Taylor, who made an appearance in Underbelly: Razor, which was set in 1920s Sydney. Justin Rosniak did not reprise his role as Squizzy as Jared Daperis took over the role.

=== Underbelly: Vanishing Act (2022) ===
Season 7 tells the story of the bizarre disappearance of Melissa Caddick, the high-roller who allegedly embezzled over $40 million before disappearing while under investigation. It is a mini-series which is part factual and part fictional.

== Underbelly: Files telemovies ==
In early 2010 the Nine Network announced that three separate stand-alone crime telemovies would continue the Underbelly franchise. Known by the collective title Underbelly: Files, the first was Tell Them Lucifer was Here, the second Infiltration and the third The Man Who Got Away. They premiered on Australia's Nine Network early in the 2011 ratings season. A fourth telemovie Chopper followed in 2018.

=== Underbelly Files: Tell Them Lucifer Was Here ===
Tell Them Lucifer Was Here depicts the 1998 murders of Victorian police officers Gary Silk and Rod Miller. It shows the enormous efforts of the Lorimer Task Force in leading the manhunt for their killer or killers.

It stars Brett Climo, Jeremy Kewley, Todd Lasance, Greg Stone, Dimitri Baveas, Ditch Davey, Jane Allsop, Annie Jones, Paul O'Brien, Daniel Whyte, Chris Bunworth, James Taylor, Craig Blumeris, Jasmine Dare, Marshall Napier, Robert Taylor, Shanti Pezet and Lee Cormie, with a return guest appearance by Don Hany as Nik ‘The Russian’ Radev – the same character he played in the original Underbelly series (which was set a few years after the events that take place in this movie).

The movie had its premiere screening across Australia on the Nine and WIN networks on Monday 7 February 2011, followed by an encore screening on GEM on Sunday 13 February 2011.

Late in 2010, this telemovie hit a legal snag as part of a pending court case in the NSW law courts, which resulted in a slightly altered version of Lucifer being broadcast in Sydney and NSW on Monday 7 February. The version screened in NSW omitted one particular scene and changed the names of a number of individuals in the case (for example 'Bandali Debs' changed to 'Patrici Fabro'); however, in an oversight, the subtitles were not edited and showed the original names. When the DVD of the Underbelly Files telemovies were released, Tell Them Lucifer Was Here was omitted from the release in NSW only. Like the first series of Underbelly in Victoria, releases of the DVD that contained Tell Them Lucifer Was Here had a warning sticker banning the exhibition of the telemovie in NSW.

=== Underbelly Files: Infiltration ===
Infiltration is an adaptation for screen from an autobiographical novel written by ex-cop Colin McLaren. He and his police partner lived undercover in Griffith, New South Wales for a number of years, in order to infiltrate the very closed and deadly Mafia community there. For days, weeks, then months and years, Colin eats with them, sits in their homes and cuddles their kids, all the while climbing the 'Ndrangheta, finally befriending the Griffith Godfather, Antonio Romeo.

The two-hour telemovie aired on 14 February 2011 and stars Sullivan Stapleton as Colin McLaren, Jessica Napier as Jude, Tottie Goldsmith as Sara, Kassandra Clementi as Chelsea McLaren, and co-stars Valentino del Toro, Buddy Dannoun, Glenda Linscott and Henry Nixon.

=== Underbelly Files: The Man Who Got Away ===
The Man Who Got Away tells the story of David McMillan who was a British born Australian drug smuggler and the only westerner in history to escape from Klong Prem prison in Bangkok.

It stars Toby Schmitz, David McMillan and Claire van der Boom as McMillan's partner Clelia Vigano. The cast also features Jeremy Sims, Aaron Jeffery, Nicholas Eadie, Brendan Cowell, Freya Stafford, Josh Lawson, John Orcsik, William Zappa, Heather Mitchell and Deidre Rubenstein. It also features Anthony Tsingas as David's father.

The Man Who Got Away premiered on the Nine Network on Monday 21 February 2011.

=== Underbelly Files: Chopper (2018) ===
Chopper is based on Australia's most notorious gangster, Mark "Chopper" Read, in the 1970s, 80s and 90s.

Chopper premiered on the Nine Network on Monday February 12, 2018, and concluded on Tuesday February 13, 2018.

== Cast and characters ==
Underbelly

- Rodger Corser as Detective Senior Sergeant Steve Owen
- Caroline Craig as Senior Detective Jacqui James
- Gyton Grantley as Carl Williams
- Kat Stewart as Roberta Williams
- Vince Colosimo as Alphonse Gangitano
- Robert Rabiah as P.K
- Les Hill as Jason Moran
- Martin Sacks as Mario Condello
- Simon Westaway as Mick Gatto

Underbelly: A Tale of Two Cities

- Roy Billing as Robert Trimbole
- Anna Hutchison as Allison Dine
- Matthew Newton as Terry Clark
- Asher Keddie as Detective Senior Constable Liz Cruickshank
- Peter Phelps as Detective Inspector Joe Messina

Underbelly: The Golden Mile

- Emma Booth as Kim Hollingsworth
- Firass Dirani as John Ibrahim
- Wil Traval as Joe Dooley
- Cheree Cassidy as Debbie Webb
- Dieter Brummer as Trevor Haken
- Paul Tassone as Dennis Kelly
- Daniel Roberts as Jim Egan
- Damien Garvey as Graham "Chook" Fowler

Underbelly: Razor

- Danielle Cormack as Kate Leigh
- Chelsie Preston Crayford as Tilly Devine
- Anna McGahan as Nellie Cameron
- Jack Campbell as "Big Jim" Devine
- John Batchelor as Wally Tomlinson
- Khan Chittenden as Frank "The Little Gunman" Green
- Richard Brancatisano as Guido Calletti
- Craig Hall as Detective Inspector Bill Mackay
- Lucy Wigmore as Lillian May Armfield
- Steve Le Marquand as Sergeant Tom Wickham

Underbelly: Badness

- Matt Nable as Detective Sergeant Gary Jubelin
- Jonathan LaPaglia as Anthony "Rooster" Perish
- Ben Winspear as Detective Sergeant Tim Browne
- Josh Quong Tart as Andrew "Undies" Perish
- Jason Montgomery as Brett "Decker" Simpson
- Ella Scott Lynch as Senior Constable Camille Alavoine
- Justin Smith as Matthew "Muzz" Lawton
- Aaron Jeffery as Frank "Tink" O'Rourke

Underbelly: Squizzy

- Jacob Francis Worrall as 'Lil Nicky' Smith
- Jared Daperis as Squizzy Taylor
- Camille Keenan as Dolly Grey
- Susie Porter as Rosie Taylor
- Ashley Zukerman as Detective James Bruce
- Luke Ford as Albert "Tankbuster" McDonald
- Dan Wyllie as Detective Frederick Piggott
- Ken Radley as Detective John Brophy
- Nathan Page as Henry Stokes
- Diana Glenn as Annie Stokes
- Matt Boesenberg as John "Snowy" Cutmore
- Andrew Ryan as Angus "Gus" Murray
- Richard Cawthorne as "Long Harry" Slater

== Viewership ==
Season	# of episodes	Season premiere	Season final	Average audience (millions)	Drama rank	Most watched episode	Viewers (millions)
1	13	13 February 2008	7 May 2008	1.260	#2	"Team Purana"	1.422
2	13	9 February 2009	4 May 2009	2.158	#1	"Aussie Bob and Kiwi Terry"	2.582
3	13	11 April 2010	27 June 2010	1.659	#2	"Into the Mystic"	2.240
4	13	21 August 2011	6 November 2011	1.457	#2	"The Worst Woman in Sydney"	2.794
5	8	13 August 2012	1 October 2012	1.026	#4	"Thy Will Be Done"	1.780
6	8	28 July 2013	1 September 2013	0.709	#9	"Squizzy Steps Out"	1.680

== International versions and sequel series ==
=== Fat Tony & Co. ===
The series Fat Tony & Co. was confirmed on 3 August 2013, and production for the series began on 5 August 2013. Based on Tony Mokbel, the series covered the manhunt for Mokbel that lasted 18 months and dismantled a drug empire and was also filmed in Greece. The series saw the return of Robert Mammone as Mokbel, Vince Colosimo as Alphonse Gangitano, Gyton Grantley as Carl Williams, Les Hill as Jason Moran, Madeleine West as Danielle McGuire, Simon Westaway as Mick Gatto, Gerard Kennedy as Graham Kinniburgh and Kevin Harrington as Lewis Moran.

=== Informer 3838 ===
Informer 3838 is a television series focusing on criminal barrister-turned police informer Nicola Gobbo (code name informer 3838) and her involvement in the Melbourne gangland killings. Commissioned by the Nine Network and produced by Screentime, it aired in late April, 2020. It follows Nicola Gobbo from her days studying law at Melbourne University in the mid-1990s, up to the very end of the deadly gangland war in 2010 following Carl Williams' death in Barwon Prison and the aftermath. Informer 3838 gives a new insight to the relationships Gobbo made in the criminal underworld with figures like Carl Williams and Tony Mokbel. The return of these characters to the Underbelly franchise also means the return of Gyton Grantley performing his previous role of Williams. Robert Mammone also resumes his casting as Mokbel. Jane Harber also returns as a policewoman this time to Underbelly, previously portraying Detective Steve Owen's partner in the first season. Rhys Muldoon plays ecstasy dealer and family man Terrence Hodson.

=== American version ===
On 22 June 2010, it was announced that the channel Starz would remake the Underbelly series. It would not be based on the original series, but instead the writers would look for American gangs and rewrite situations in Underbelly: A Tale of Two Cities, replacing character traits and outcomes.

=== New Zealand version ===
This six-part mini-series aired on TV3 in New Zealand from 17 August to 21 September 2011. Underbelly NZ: Land of the Long Green Cloud is set in New Zealand between 1972 and 1980. Events depicted include the origins of the Mr. Asia drug syndicate and its original leader, Marty Johnstone. Though not a part of the Australian series chronology, this series is partly a prequel and partly runs concurrently with events in Underbelly: A Tale of Two Cities. Main characters include Marty Johnstone, Andy Maher and Detective Constable Ben Charlton.

== Home video releases ==
Underbelly DVD Releases:

Series	Set details	DVD release dates			Special features
Series	Set details	Region 1	Region 2	Region 4	Special features
Underbelly (uncut)	Discs: 4 / 5 (Limited edition); Episodes: 13	29 January 2013	9 February 2009	8 May 2008 (Note: Also released as a Limited Edition Steelbook 5 disc set on 6 November 2008) (Note: The first series of Underbelly is not available for sale or distribution in Victoria, due to the Supreme Court of Victoria's prohibition of its distribution or exhibition therein.)	'Carl Williams – The Day of Reckoning' documentary (Limited edition only)
Underbelly: A Tale of Two Cities (uncut)	Discs: 4 / 5 (Limited edition); Episodes: 13	8 January 2013	25 March 2013	27 May 2009 (Note: Also released as a Limited Edition Steelbook 5 disc set on 5 November 2009)	Extended scenes (Limited edition only)
Underbelly: The Golden Mile – Fully Loaded	Discs: 4; Episodes: 13	8 January 2013	27 May 2013	1 July 2010 (Note: Also released as a Sanity exclusive with Lenticular Packaging and a JB Hi-Fi Exclusive Collectors Edition DVD & T-shirt boxset)	Deleted scenes; Audio commentaries on 2 episodes; Behind the scenes – interviews and on set footage
Underbelly: Razor (uncut)	Discs: 4; Episodes: 13	TBA	TBA	10 November 2011	Deleted Scenes; VFX - Past to Present; Photo Gallery
Underbelly: Badness (uncut)	Discs: 3; Episodes: 8	TBA	TBA	5 October 2012	Deleted scenes; Cast interviews
Underbelly: Squizzy (uncut)	Discs: 3; Episodes: 8	TBA	TBA	11 September 2013	Deleted scenes; Photo gallery

Blu-ray

Series	Set details	Blu-ray release dates	Special features
Series	Set details	Region B	Special features
Underbelly (uncut)	Discs: 4; Episodes: 13	5 August 2010	Behind the Scenes: The Underside; Carl Williams: Day of Reckoning
Underbelly: A Tale of Two Cities (uncut)	Discs: 3; Episodes: 13	4 November 2010	
Underbelly: The Golden Mile – Fully Loaded	Discs: 3; Episodes: 13	4 November 2010	Deleted scenes; Audio commentaries on 2 episodes; Behind the scenes – interviews and on set footage
Underbelly: Razor (uncut)	Discs: 3; Episodes: 13	1 December 2011	Creating the Past; Deleted scenes; Photo gallery
Underbelly: Badness (uncut)	Discs: 2; Episodes: 8	5 October 2012	Deleted scenes; Cast interviews
Underbelly: Squizzy (uncut)	Discs: 2; Episodes: 8	11 September 2013	Deleted scenes; Photo gallery
Fat Tony & Co (uncut)	Discs: 2; Episodes: 9	9 April 2014	Deleted scenes

DVD box sets

Title	Set details	DVD release dates		Special features
Title	Set details	Region 1	Region 4	Special features
Underbelly – Triple Shot	Discs: 14; Episodes: 39	—N/a	4 November 2010	
Underbelly – The Trilogy	Discs: 12; Episodes: 39	6 December 2011	—N/a	
Underbelly – Foursome	Discs: 18; Episodes: 52	—N/a	1 December 2011	

=== Underbelly (TV Seasons) DVDs ===
Title	Ep#	Discs	Region 1 (USA)	Region 2 (UK)	Region 4 (Australia)	Special features	Distributors
Underbelly: Gangland War (Season 01)	13	-	29 January 2013	9 February 2009	8 May 2008 (Except VIC) 2019 (Vic)	The Day of Reckoning' documentary	Roadshow Entertainment
Underbelly: A Tale of Two Cities (uncut) (Season 2)			8 January 2013	25 March 2013	27 May 2009	Extended scenes (Limited edition only)	Roadshow Entertainment
Underbelly: The Golden Mile – Fully Loaded (Season 3)			8 January 2013	27 May 2013	1 July 2010	Deleted scenes Audio commentaries on 2 episodes Behind the scenes – interviews and on set footage	Roadshow Entertainment
Underbelly: Razor (uncut) (Season 4)	13	4	-	-	11 November 2011	Deleted Scenes VFX - Past to Present Photo Gallery	Roadshow Entertainment
Underbelly: Badness (uncut) (Season 5)	08	03	-	-	5 October 2012	Deleted scenes Cast interviews	Roadshow Entertainment
Underbelly: Squizzy (uncut) (Season 06)	08	03	-	-	11 September 2013	Deleted scenes Photo gallery	Roadshow Entertainment
Underbelly: Files (3 Disc Set)	-	03			24 February 2011 (VIC Only)	None	Roadshow Entertainment
Underbelly: Files (2 Disc Set)	-	02			24 February 2011 (NSW Only)	None	Roadshow Entertainment
Underbelly NZ: Land of the Long Green Cloud	06	-		26 August 2013	22 September 2011	None	Roadshow Entertainment
Fat Tony & Co.	09	03			9 April 2014	Deleted Scenes	Roadshow Entertainment
Underbelly Files: Chopper	02	02	-	-	4 April 2018	Behind The Scenes: Interviews	Roadshow Entertainment
Informer 3838	02	02			17 June 2020	None	Roadshow Entertainment
Underbelly: Vanishing Act		-	-	-	-	-	Roadshow Entertainment

== Video game ==
In October 2012, Underbelly: Skirmish, the first Underbelly game, was released on the iTunes app store. The game is available for iPhones and iPads. An Android version was in production with a release date scheduled prior to December 2012. The game has a "cops vs robbers" gameplay mechanic, with the player able to choose between playing as a cop, or as a member of the Rough Company.

The game was produced by Underbelly's producers, Screentime, and transmedia production company, The Project Factory, with development by Epiphany Games.
