= Jeffrey Walker (director) =

Australian director and actor (born 1982)

- Walker (left) on the set of crime comedy-drama series Small Time Gangster with actor Jared Daperis
- Born: 10 July 1982 (age 44); Melbourne, Victoria, Australia
- Occupations: Actor (1988–2007); Director (2003–present)
- Years active: 1988–present
- Spouse: Brooke Harman

Jeffrey Walker (born 10 July 1982) is an Australian director and former actor, best known to the Australian public for his appearances as a child actor in Ocean Girl and Round the Twist. He moved on to direct episodes of Australian soaps Neighbours, Home and Away, and H_{2}O: Just Add Water, and now directs feature films and TV series in Australia and the US. He is married to American-born Australian actress Brooke Harman-Walker.

== Career ==
Walker's first acting credit was a small role in The Flying Doctors in 1989. He also appeared in the 1991 film Proof in flashback sequences of Hugo Weaving's character as a child. In 1992, he took over the role of Bronson Twist in the television series Round the Twist, based on the books by Paul Jennings. In 1994 he received a leading role in Ocean Girl as "Brett Bates". He had another major role as the brother Royce on Mirror, Mirror.

Walker received leading roles in The Wayne Manifesto in 1996 (for which he received a Young Actor's Award from the Australian Film Institute) and Thunderstone (1999), in which he played Wayne and Noah Daniels respectively.

Since his appearance in Thunderstone, Walker has focused his efforts on directing, working on soaps such as Neighbours and Home and Away and series such as Holly's Heroes and children's series Dance Academy, Wicked Science, H_{2}O: Just Add Water, The Elephant Princess and Blue Water High.

Walker has directed episodes of US TV series including Modern Family, Bones, Young Sheldon and Young Rock.

Walker was closely associated with the Dance Academy children's franchise. He was the setup director for the first five episodes of the TV series, and directed eight episodes in total, plus the 2017 spinoff feature film Dance Academy: The Movie.

He made his feature film directorial debut with the romantic comedy Ali's Wedding, adapted from a memoir by Osamah Sami.

He has directed numerous well-received miniseries and limited series for streaming, including the BBC's historical drama Banished; Lambs of God for Foxtel; The Commons for Stan; and The Clearing for Disney+.

== Awards ==
Walker has won two AACTA Awards: in 2019 for Best Television Direction, for Lambs of God; and in 2013 for the telemovie Jack Irish: Bad Debts.

He has also been nominated for AACTA Awards in 2024 for his work on The Clearing; in 2018 for the telemovie Riot; in 2017 for the romantic comedy film Ali's Wedding; in 2015 for the drama series Banished; and in 2012 for Small Time Gangster.

He was also nominated for an Australian Film Institute (AFI) Award for Best TV Direction in 2010 for Dance Academy.

Walker has won three Australian Directors' Guild Awards: in 2015 for Best Direction in a Telemovie, for Jack Irish: Dead Point; in 2012, for Best Direction in a Comedy Series, for Angry Boys; and in 2010, for Best Direction in Children's Television, for Dance Academy.

In 2012 he won the ADG's Esben Storm Award for Best Direction in a Children's TV Program, for Just Add Water.

He has also been nominated for ADG Awards for his work on The Artful Dodger, The Clearing and The Portable Door.

== Personal life ==
Walker met future wife Brooke Harman while they worked together on The Wayne Manifesto. They have three sons: Boston Scott Walker (born 24 June 2013), Ace Jackson Walker (born 24 June 2015), and Leo Walker (born 19 October 2018).

Walker appeared in the video clip of the John Butler Trio's song titled 'Something's Gotta Give'.

Walker played guitar in Sydney band Ballet Imperial, which formed in 2006 and released a self-titled EP in 2007.

== Filmography ==
=== Television ===
Director

Year	Title	Director	Executive Producer	Notes
2003-04	Neighbours	Yes	No	32 episodes
2004	Fergus McPhail	Yes	No	
2004	Blue Heelers	Yes	No	Episodes "Secrets & Lies" and "Bring It On"
2005	Home and Away	Yes	No	3 episodes
2005	Last Man Standing	Yes	No	2 episodes
2005	Holly's Heroes	Yes	No	Episodes "Double Team" and "Rejection"
2005–06	All Saints	Yes	No	Episodes "Life's Lottery" and "Dead Girl Walking"
2006	Wicked Science	Yes	No	5 episodes
2006–10	H2O: Just Add Water	Yes	No	39 episodes
2007–08	City Homicide	Yes	No	4 episodes
2008	The Elephant Princess	Yes	No	Episode "Coming of Age"
2010	Not Available	Yes	No	TV short
2010	Dance Academy	Yes	No	8 episodes
2010–12	Rake	Yes	No	Episode "R v Chandler", "R v Langhorn", "R v Turner" and "R v Alford"
2011	Small Time Gangster	Yes	No	8 episodes
2011	Angry Boys	Yes	No	12 episodes
2011	Wild Boys	Yes	No	2 episodes
2012	Jack Irish: Black Tide	Yes	No	TV movie
2012	Jack Irish: Bad Debts	Yes	No	TV movie
2013	Don't Trust the B— in Apartment 23	Yes	No	Episodes "Paris..." and "The D..."
2013	Zach Stone Is Gonna Be Famous	Yes	No	3 episodes
2013	Super Fun Night	Yes	No	Episodes "Three Men and a Boubier"
2013–14	The Neighbors	Yes	No	3 episodes
2013–14	Bones	Yes	No	"The Friend in Need", "The Repo Man in the Septic Tank"
2013–19	Modern Family	Yes	No	7 episodes
2014	Raising Hope	Yes	No	Episode "Hey There, Delilah"
2014	Rake	Yes	No	Episode "Man's Best Friend"
2014	Jack Irish: Dead Point	Yes	Co-producer	TV movie
2014	Mixology	Yes	No	Episode "Bruce & Maya"
2015	Banished	Yes	No	4 episodes
2015	Backstrom	Yes	No	Episode "Corkscrewed"
2015–17	Difficult People	Yes	Executive	26 episodes
2017	Fresh Off the Boat	Yes	No	1 episode
2017	Life in Pieces	Yes	No	1 episode
2018	Riot	Yes	No	TV movie
2018	LA to Vegas	Yes	No	2 episodes
2019	Lambs of God	Yes	No	
2021-22	Young Rock	Yes	Executive	2 episodes
2023	The Clearing	Yes	Executive	Miniseries
2025	Apple Cider Vinegar	Yes	Co-executive	6 episodes

Actor

Year	Title	Role	Notes
1989	The Flying Doctors	Mikey Maguire	Episode "Dad's Little Bloke"
1991	Pugwall	Banziel Wall	Episode "Christmas Hocking"
1992	Round the Twist	Bronson Twist	
1992	Good Vibrations	Jack	Miniseries
1993	Police Rescue	Tommy Campbell	Episode "Rush Hour"
1993–94	Halfway Across the Galaxy and Turn Left	Qwrk	
1994	Sky Trackers	Timothy Bolderwood	Episode "Trees a Crowd"
1994–97	Ocean Girl	Brett Bates	
1995	The Man from Snowy River	Jamie Ross	Episode "The Railroad"
1995	Mirror, Mirror	Royce Tiegan	
1996	Blue Heelers	Rowdy Yates	Episode "A Fair Crack of the Whip: Parts 1 & 2"
1996-97	The Wayne Manifesto	Wayne Wilson	
1999	Blue Heelers	Tim Sullivan	Episode "Miracle at Rabbit Creek"
1999–2000	Thunderstone	Noah Daniels	
2007	Spy Shop	Dale Deakin	

=== Film ===
Director

Year	Title	Notes
2017	Ali's Wedding	
2017	Dance Academy: The Movie	
2023	The Portable Door	
2026	Allen	Co-directed with Daley Pearson
2026	Fing!	

Actor

Year	Title	Role
1990	The Man in the Blue and White Holden	Colin
1991	Proof	Young Martin
