= Thunderstone (TV series) =

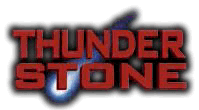
- Genre: Adventure science fiction
- Created by: Jonathan M. Shiff
- Starring: Jeffrey Walker; Mereoni Vuki; Emily Browning; Daniel Daperis; Gerard Kennedy; Stuart Halusz; Jim Daly
- Country of origin: Australia
- Original language: English
- No. of seasons: 3
- No. of episodes: 52 (list of episodes)

Production
- Executive producer: Jonathan M. Shiff (season 3)
- Producer: Jonathan M. Shiff
- Running time: 30 minutes
- Production company: Jonathan M. Shiff Productions

Original release
- Network: Network Ten
- Release: 12 February 1999 – 8 September 2000

Thunderstone is an Australian science fiction television series produced by Jonathan M. Shiff Productions set in a post-apocalyptic world after Earth is hit by a comet. The main character Noah is played by Jeffrey Walker. Other actors who appear in the series are Gerard Kennedy, Christopher Elliott, Emily Browning, and Daniel Daperis.

The show was originally broadcast on Network Ten from 12 February 1999 until 8 September 2000. Both the first and second seasons were also shown on ABC Kids.

== Synopsis ==
The main character Noah Daniels, his family and other survivors who live in an underground colony called North Col in the year 2020. It is impossible to live on the planet's surface, because of the extreme cold and constant snow storms caused by the impact of a comet known as Nemesis. As all animal life was destroyed by the comet's strike, the children are taught about these extinct animals with the aid of a holodeck. As a side effect of the holodeck, Noah finds himself transported into the future, into a place called Haven, where a group of children known as the Nomads battle the evil Tao and his men, The Protectors, for control of a valuable blue mineral called thunderstone.

Thunderstone is the name given to the chemical compound of which the Nemesis comet was made. It is a source of energy and power, and can be used to do anything from making explosives to allowing vehicles to run on it like gas. It also reacts violently when it comes into contact with itself, causing it to disintegrate if enough impact is made. When drunk as a compounded solution, it grants long life to the drinker. Much of the plot revolves around attempts to control the supplies of thunderstone due to its many useful properties.

== Characters ==
=== North Col ===
- Noah Daniels (played by Jeffrey Walker) – a teenage boy who lives in the underground research station North Col in the year 2020. Noah is bright, resourceful and inquisitive. He is faithful to his friends and family and will do whatever it takes to help them.
- Becky Daniels (Kate Keltie) – Noah's younger sister. When Noah disappears from North Col, Becky becomes determined to find him. She is the one who first suggests that Noah has traveled through time.
- Dr. Liz Daniels (Nikki Coghill) – Noah and Becky's mother.
- Dr. Simon Daniels (Andrew Larkins) – Noah and Becky's father.
- Dr. Pretorius (Gerard Kennedy) – a member of the Triumvirate, the law-making body of North Col. He acts as a mentor to Noah and aids him in some of his endeavors. But he is in reality the Shadowmaster. He is the main antagonist in season 1.

=== Haven ===
- Arushka (Mereoni Vuki) – leader of the Nomads and best friend of Noah.
- Sundance (Damien Fotiou) – a Nomad. Twin brother of Sutch.
- Geneva (Anna-Grace Hopkins) – a Nomad.
- Kwan (Nathan Wentworth) – a Nomad. Specialises in cooking.
- Chip (Daniel Daperis) – a Nomad.

== Series history ==
=== Season 1 ===
Season one revolves around Noah's adventures in Haven. As he brings more and more animals from the past to inhabit Haven and continues to jump back and forth through North Col, Haven, and the past before the Nemesis Comet hit, he attracts attention from the Triumvirate in North Col and the Shadow Master in Haven. This causes a chain of events that reveal the true identity of the Shadow Master, and his goal to acquire enough thunderstone to become immortal. Noah and company devise a plot to destroy the core of the Nemesis Comet which was recently discovered by the Shadow Master, to prevent him from gaining absolute control over Haven. They destroy it using its explosive property by combining it with huge amounts of salt and igniting it. The Shadow Master is killed as he approaches the supply of thunderstone, watching his life's work become terminated. Tao's true nature is also revealed, and his minions flee and become no more.

=== Season 2 ===
With the Shadow Master and his minions defeated, Noah stays at North Col but misses Haven and is tempted to go back. When he does, he becomes stranded since there is no longer any thunderstone left, or so it seems. In this season, the plot revolves around acquiring a large Thunderstone Cube, which Noah learns about from fugitives from the future, named Mayah and her brothers, who brought it there under a lake. After obtaining it, Noah realises he could travel back in time and use its power to destroy the Nemesis Comet completely, preventing the apocalypse. The season ends with Noah using the energy to completely incinerate the comet and thus, ironically, cause everything he did in Season 1 to cease to exist, in his own words: "Not in this dimension". This causes Mayah and her brothers to cease to exist, and the Earth now has a brighter future. The comet broke off into a ring of thunderstone that revolves around the Earth, which is a major plot point for season three.

=== Season 3 ===
Noah is recognised for his genius, and this season begins with experimental wormholes of his design. This allows him to set up a space colony. The people from the future of this space colony wish to assassinate young Noah, because his future self was said to have murdered their parents. They use Noah's time travel technology and make several attempts on his life. The season involves Noah trying to find the truth about what happened and making peace with these people.

== Broadcast history ==
The show aired in the Republic of Ireland on RTÉ Two from 5 February 2001 in the early 2000s.

Thunderstone has also been aired multiple times over the years in Sri Lanka by the Sri Lanka Rupavahini Corporation, dubbed in Sinhalese under the name "ගිගුරුම් දනව්ව" (gigurum danavva), lit. 'Thunderstorm'.

== DVD releases ==
Season 1 was released on a three-disc DVD set by Umbrella Entertainment on 28 June 2008.
