= Geordie Robinson =

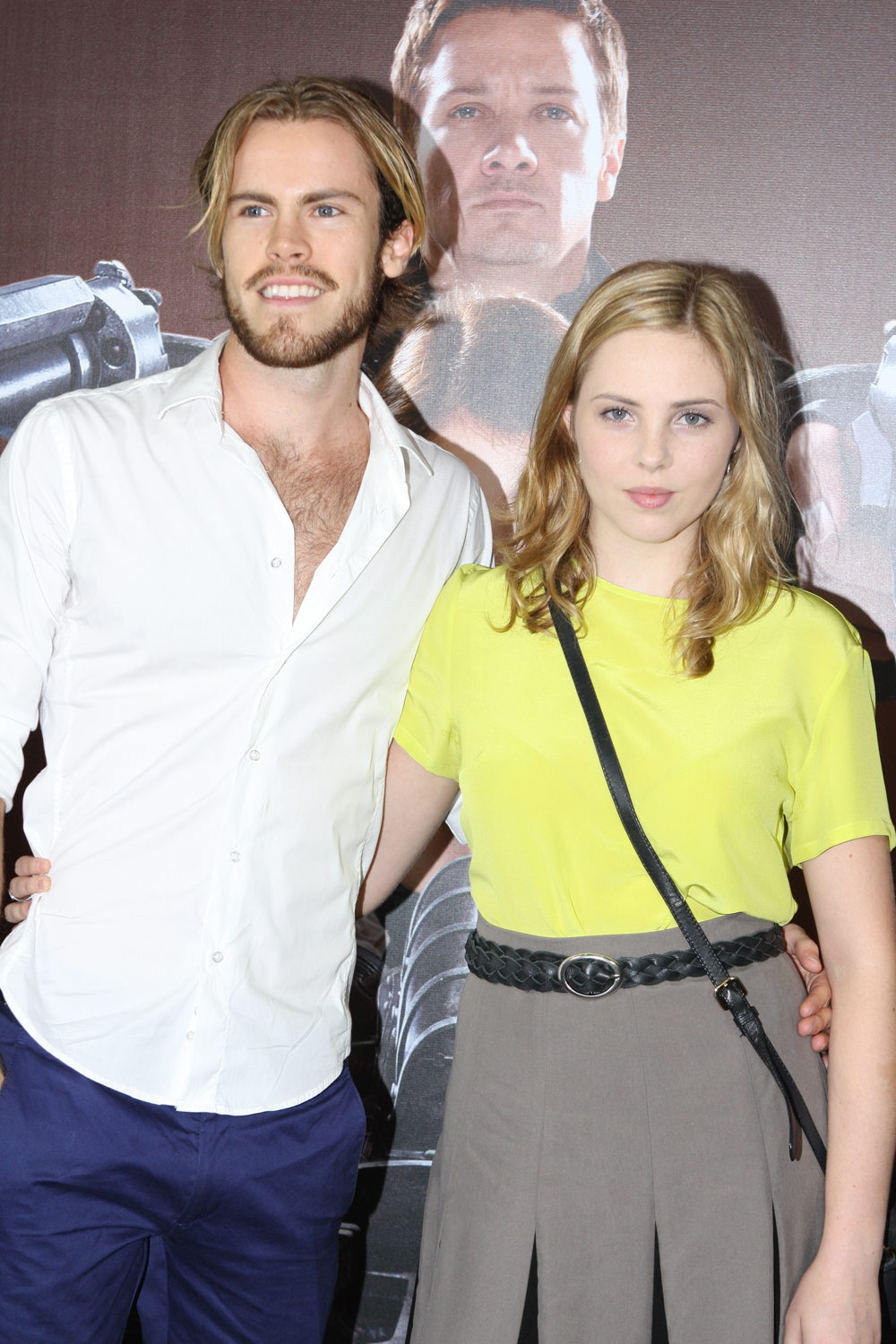
Robinson with Morgan Griffin at Hansel & Gretel: Witch Hunters premiere in Sydney, Australia

Geordie Robinson (born 18 June 1987) is an Australian television, film and theatre actor known for his roles on the television series Underbelly: Badness and Winter.

Robinson's theatre roles include Green Cyc's production of The Taming of the Shrew (2008), as well as starring as Laertes in the Q Theatre production of Hamlet, Sydney (2011).

In 2011, Robinson was cast in the Australian premiere of the play The Birthday Boys at The National Institute of Dramatic Art. In 2012, Robinson was cast in the television series Underbelly: Badness as Craig "Schiz" Bottin, Drug Cook and Decker's associate. In 2014 Robinson acted opposite Rebecca Gibney in the TV series Winter. Robinson previous guest roles included the Australian medical drama All Saints and the pilot Could Gone Pro, along with a small role in the Australian film A Few Best Men. Robinson appeared in the Australian short film The Pear and the upcoming American drama series Girls Like Magic, directed by Mad Men actor Kit Williamson. Robinson appeared in the lead role of Blackrock by Nick Enright in the Australian Theatre Company in Los Angeles (2015).

In 2016, Robinson played the role of Liam in the Funny or Die and Go90 partnered series.

== Personal life ==
Robinson was born in the seaside village of Sawtell, on the North Coast of New South Wales. After graduating high school at Bishop Druitt College in 2005, Robinson was accepted into The Actors Centre Australia's full-time Journey program.
