= Ocean Star =

Australian children's TV series

- Starring: Jared Daperis; Jason Smith; Graeme Blundell; Brooke Callaghan; Rob Carlton; Sage Butler; Rohanna Angus; Kate Rice; Kai Kamada-Laws; Mark Coles Smith; Andrew Lewis; Penny Arrow
- Country of origin: Australia
- Original language: English
- No. of seasons: 1
- No. of episodes: 13

Original release
- Network: Network Ten
- Release: 10 February 2003 – 2003

Ocean Star is an Australian children's television series that first screened on Network Ten on 10 February 2003. In 2004, it was nominated for the Logie Awards in the category of Most Outstanding Children's Program.

== Plot summary ==
Trent and Dylan Steadman are city kids who are sent by their mother to live with their father in a small seaside town. They struggle to make friends with the local kids. Trent meets Swampy, an old pearl diver who tells him about a priceless cluster of pearls known as the 'Ocean Star' that he claims were lost when his boat sunk in a cyclone forty years ago. The quest for the treasure sends Trent and the kids on an exciting and dangerous adventure.

== Cast ==
- Jared Daperis as Trent Steadman
- Jason Smith as Dylan Steadman
- Graeme Blundell as Clive 'Swampy' Marsh
- Brooke Callaghan as Gemma Carruthers
- Rob Carlton as Reg Davies
- Sage Butler as Karla Davies
- Rohanna Angus as Bronwyn Michaels
- Kate Rice as Caitlin Carruthers
- Kai Kamada-Laws as Susi Fujiwara
- Mark Coles Smith as 'Spider' Webb
- Andrew Lewis as Grant Steadman
- Penny Arrow as Denise Bennett

== See also ==
- List of Australian television series
