= Anthony Perish =

Australian murderer

- Born: Anthony John Michael Perish; 4 September 1969 (age 57); Leppington, New South Wales, Australia
- Other name: Rooster Perish
- Relatives: Anthony Perish Sr. (1902–1993) (grandfather); Frances Perish (1900–1993) (grandmother)
- Status: In custody
- Motive: Revenge
- Convictions: Murder; Criminal conspiracy
- Penalty: 24 years' imprisonment, with a non-parole period of 18 years (2012)
- Accomplices: Andrew Perish (brother); Matthew Lawton

Details
- Victims: Terry Falconer
- Date: c. 16 November 2001
- Country: Australia
- State: New South Wales
- Date apprehended: 19 March 2009
- Imprisoned at: Lithgow Correctional Centre

Anthony John Michael "Rooster" Perish (born 4 September 1969) is a convicted Australian murderer from Leppington, New South Wales, who killed a Sydney drug dealer, Terry Falconer, in November 2001. Perish was assisted in the murder of Falconer by his brother, Andrew, and an associate, Matthew Lawton. Anthony Perish, Andrew Perish, and Lawton pleaded not guilty and were trialled by jury. Anthony Perish and Lawton were found guilty of murder and criminal conspiracy; Andrew Perish was found guilty of criminal conspiracy.

On 13 April 2012, all three were sentenced in the Supreme Court of New South Wales. Anthony Perish received a maximum custodial sentence of 24 years, to expire on 18 March 2033, with a minimum non-parole period of 18 years, to expire on 18 March 2027. Lawton received a maximum custodial sentence of 20 years, to expire on 26 January 2029, with a minimum non-parole period of 15 years, that expired on 26 January 2024. Andrew Perish received a maximum custodial sentence of 12 years, which expired on 3 October 2022, with a minimum non-parole period of nine years, that expired on 3 October 2019.

== Background ==
Anthony and Frances Perish, the grandparents of Anthony and Andrew Perish were murdered on 14 June 1993 at their Leppington home. The NSW Police investigation under the name of Strike Force Seabrook was unable to identify who had murdered Anthony and Frances Perish. Anthony and Andrew Perish became motivated to kill Terrence (Terry) Falconer, a convicted Sydney drug dealer, as they believed he was involved in the murders. Perish also thought that Falconer was a possible police informant with information that might compromise the Rebels Motorcycle Club drug-running, activities.

On 16 November 2001, Perish and his associates disguised themselves as under-cover detectives and conducted a fake arrest of Falconer, who was serving a prison sentence at the time, while he was on a work release program. Falconer was allegedly taken to Turramurra within a sealed box and finally to Girvan, near Booral, elsewhere in New South Wales. In transit, Falconer died from asphyxiation prior to a (posthumous) encounter with Anthony Perish, after which the Perish gang mutilated and cut up his body, disposing of the dead man's remains within the Hastings River, near Port Macquarie.

Perish and his collaborators were apprehended in 2008 and went to trial in April 2012. In the New South Wales Supreme Court, the Perish brothers and associates were found guilty of killing Falconer in September 2011. On 14 April 2012, they were sentenced as given above for homicide and criminal conspiracy. Anthony Perish was sentenced to eighteen years' imprisonment, while his brother, Andrew Perish, was sentenced to nine years, and an associate, Lawton, was sentenced to fifteen years, on murder and criminal conspiracy charges.

== Other alleged criminal behaviours ==
At that time, Anthony had already begun his criminal career and was already wanted for manufacturing amphetamines and supplying the drug to others. For the next fourteen years (1993–2007), Anthony evaded justice as an itinerant, periodically relocating to Turramurra and Girvan in New South Wales, and South Australia. During his period in South Australia, he resumed production and distribution of amphetamine and methamphetamine, in conjunction with disgraced former solicitor Justin Birk Hill.

In 1994, Andrew Perish joined the Rebels Motorcycle Club and like his brother, came under suspicion of amphetamine manufacture. In 1995, Andrew killed Kai Dempsey at the Railway Hotel, Liverpool but was acquitted purportedly after having intimidated prosecution witnesses. Four years later, in 1998, Andrew was working as a security guard with Sean Waygood, who had started a failed security business of his own but went bankrupt after several months. Along with Keith Payne, Michael Christensen and Jeremy Postlewaight, Andrew allegedly committed robberies, engaged in drug manufacture, extortion of money from third parties and sundry other offences. In 2001, Sean Waygood was responsible for wounding Gary Mack, a drug debtor to Andrew's distribution network. Ian Draper, a witness to the Mack shooting, was reportedly murdered by Andrew in a local hotel.

Together with his brother, Andrew Perish, and other members of his criminal gang, as well as outlaw motorcycle clubs, Perish and associates are estimated to be responsible for at least six murders and two suspicious deaths. Altogether, the Terry Falconer/Perish gang murder investigation took over a decade and involved fourteen people, who are estimated to have committed at least one hundred separate offences that involve amphetamine and methamphetamine drug dealing, assault, abduction, murder and manslaughter.

In 2002, Waygood and Christiansen tried to kill a rival Bandidos Motorcycle Club member at Haymarket, shooting the individual, who survived the attack. Waygood and Christiansen are believed to have killed Gold Coast businessman Michael Davies. At the same time, Anthony Perish and Waygood stole $A25,000 worth of chemicals from BOC Gases in Wetherill Park for use in drug manufacturing. In 2006, Andrew was arrested in Hoxton Park, within a fortified base of operations. In 2007, Andrew was convicted of theft, as well as amphetamine manufacture and firearms offences in 2008, and sentenced to four years' imprisonment.

In 2008, Waygood was located in Mudgee where Anthony Perish was involved in building a large facility with a spacious basement, suspected to be for further amphetamine production and manufacture. During October 2008, Task Force Tuno traced Waygood to several Gold Coast pubs, nightclubs and hotels believed to be owned by Anthony Perish, before handing a package to Perish in Brisbane at the end of his journey. Finally, in December 2008, Christensen murdered Melbourne gangland figure Paul Elliott, who had arrived in Sydney after being sold a faulty batch of methamphetamine. Christensen dumped the body at sea. In January 2009, NSW Police officers arrested Waygood and Anthony Perish.

== Underbelly: Badness ==
Sydney journalist Michael Duffy wrote an account of the activities of the Perish gang and associates entitled Bad: The Inside Story of Australia's Biggest Murder Investigation. The activities of the Perish gang were also the subject of the fifth season of the Underbelly "true crime" television programme, Underbelly: Badness. Perish was portrayed by Jonathan LaPaglia.
