= List of Underbelly episodes =

Underbelly is an Australian television true crime-drama series which first aired on the Nine Network on 13 February 2008 and last aired 1 September 2013. Each series was based on real-life events. There have been six series in total.

== Series overview ==
Series	Subtitle	Episodes	Originally released	
Series	Subtitle	Episodes	First released	Last released
1	Underbelly	13	13 February 2008	7 May 2008
2	A Tale of Two Cities	13	9 February 2009	4 May 2009
3	The Golden Mile	13	11 April 2010	27 June 2010
4	Razor	13	21 August 2011	6 November 2011
5	Badness	8	13 August 2012	1 October 2012
6	Squizzy	8	28 July 2013	1 September 2013
7	Vanishing Act	2	3 April 2022	4 April 2022

== Episodes ==
=== Series 1: Underbelly (2008) ===
No. overall	No. in series	Title	Directed by	Written by	Original release date
1	1	"The Black Prince"	Tony Tilse	Peter Gawler	13 February 2008
2	2	"Sorcerer's Apprentice"	Tony Tilse	Peter Gawler	13 February 2008
3	3	"I Still Pray"	Geoff Bennett	Felicity Packard	20 February 2008
4	4	"Cocksure"	Geoff Bennett	Greg Haddrick	27 February 2008
5	5	"The Good, the Bad, the Ugly"	Peter Andrikidis	Peter Gawler	5 March 2008
6	6	"Luv U 4 Eva"	Peter Andrikidis	Greg Haddrick	12 March 2008
7	7	"Wise Monkeys"	Peter Andrikidis	Felicity Packard	19 March 2008
8	8	"Earning a Crust"	Peter Andrikidis	Peter Gawler	26 March 2008
9	9	"Suffer the Children"	Grant Brown	Felicity Packard	2 April 2008
10	10	"Scratched"	Grant Brown	Greg Haddrick	16 April 2008
11	11	"Barbarians at the Gate"	Tony Tilse	Peter Gawler	23 April 2008
12	12	"Best Laid Plans"	Tony Tilse	Felicity Packard	30 April 2008
13	13	"Team Purana"	Tony Tilse	Peter Gawler	7 May 2008

=== Series 2: A Tale of Two Cities (2009) ===
No. overall	No. in series	Title	Directed by	Written by	Original release date
14	1	"Aussie Bob & Kiwi Terry"	Ken Cameron	Peter Gawler	9 February 2009
15	2	"Bad Habits"	Ken Cameron	Peter Gawler	9 February 2009
16	3	"Brave New World"	Shawn Seet	Felicity Packard	16 February 2009
17	4	"Business as Usual"	Shawn Seet	Felicity Packard	23 February 2009
18	5	"A Tale of Two Hitmen"	Tony Tilse	Kris Mrksa	2 March 2009
19	6	"Stranded"	Tony Tilse	Kris Mrksa	9 March 2009
20	7	"A Nice Little Earner"	Tony Tilse	Kris Mrksa	16 March 2009
21	8	"Diamonds"	Shawn Seet	Greg Haddrick	23 March 2009
22	9	"Judas Kiss"	Shawn Seet	Felicity Packard	30 March 2009
23	10	"The Reckoning"	Grant Brown	Felicity Packard	20 April 2009
24	11	"The Brotherhood"	Grant Brown	Kris Mrksa	20 April 2009
25	12	"O Lucky Man"	Tony Tilse	Peter Gawler	27 April 2009
26	13	"The Loved Ones"	Tony Tilse	Peter Gawler	4 May 2009

=== Series 3: The Golden Mile (2010) ===
No. overall	No. in series	Title	Directed by	Written by	Original release date
27	1	"Into the Mystic"	Tony Tilse	Felicity Packard	11 April 2010
28	2	"The Crucible"	Tony Tilse	Felicity Packard	11 April 2010
29	3	"Kingdom Come"	Tony Tilse	Greg Haddrick	18 April 2010
30	4	"Fall Guy"	Tony Tilse	Kris Mrksa	25 April 2010
31	5	"Saving Face"	Shawn Seet	Kris Mrksa	9 May 2010
32	6	"Women in Uniform"	Shawn Seet	Peter Gawler	9 May 2010
33	7	"Full Force Gale"	Shawn Seet	Peter Gawler	16 May 2010
34	8	"Crossroads"	Shawn Seet	Felicity Packard	23 May 2010
35	9	"Dog Eat Dog"	Shawn Seet	Kris Mrksa	30 May 2010
36	10	"Hurt on Duty"	Tony Tilse	Kris Mrksa	6 June 2010
37	11	"Beauty and the Beast"	Tony Tilse	Peter Gawler	13 June 2010
38	12	"The Good Lieutenant"	Tony Tilse	Felicity Packard	20 June 2010
39	13	"Alpha and Omega"	Tony Tilse	Greg Haddrick	27 June 2010

=== Series 4: Razor (2011) ===
No. overall	No. in series	Title	Directed by	Written by	Original release date
40	1	"The Worst Woman in Sydney"	Tony Tilse	Peter Gawler	21 August 2011
41	2	"Whips and Scorpions"	Tony Tilse	Peter Gawler	21 August 2011
42	3	"Cat Amongst the Pigeons"	Cherie Nowlan	Felicity Packard	28 August 2011
43	4	"The Damage Done"	Cherie Nowlan	Felicity Packard	4 September 2011
44	5	"The Darlinghurst Outrage"	Shawn Seet	Michaeley O'Brien	11 September 2011
45	6	"Blood Alley"	Shawn Seet	Michaeley O'Brien	18 September 2011
46	7	"Tripe and Brains"	David Caesar	Jeff Truman	25 September 2011
47	8	"A Big Shivoo"	David Caesar	Jeff Truman	2 October 2011
48	9	"The Crash"	Mat King	Michaeley O'Brien	9 October 2011
49	10	"The Sentimental Bloke"	Mat King	Felicity Packard	16 October 2011
50	11	"Jerusalem Revisited"	Shawn Seet	Jeff Truman	23 October 2011
51	12	"Big Moves"	David Caesar	Michaeley O'Brien	30 October 2011
52	13	"Armageddon"	Shawn Sheet	Felicity Packard	6 November 2011

=== Series 5: Badness (2012) ===
No. overall	No. in series	Title	Directed by	Written by	Original release date	Prod. code	Aus. viewers (millions)
53	1	"Thy Will Be Done"	Tony Tilse	Felicty Packard	13 August 2012	210752-1	1.78
54	2	"Cut Snake and Crazy"	Tony Tilse	Felicity Packard	20 August 2012	210752-2	1.23
55	3	"The Loaded Dog"	David Caesar	Peter Gawler	27 August 2012	210752-3	1.04
56	4	"Year of the Rooster"	David Caesar	Peter Gawler	3 September 2012	210752-4	0.99
57	5	"Troubleshooting"	Ian Watson	Niki Aken	10 September 2012	210752-5	1.03
58	6	"Road to Nowhere"	Ian Watson	Jeff Truman	17 September 2012	210752-6	1.01
59	7	"Bang, Bang, Kill, Kill"	Tony Tilse	Jeff Truman	17 September 2012^{[a]}	210752-7	0.48
60	8	"Strike Force Tuno"	Tony Tilse	Niki Aken	1 October 2012	210752-8	0.86

=== Series 6: Squizzy (2013) ===
No. overall	No. in series	Title	Directed by	Written by	Original release date	Prod. code	Aus. viewers (millions)
61	1	"Squizzy Steps Out"	David Caesar	Felicity Packard	28 July 2013	216837-1	1.68
62	2	"Squizzy Puts One Over"	David Caesar	Felicity Packard	28 July 2013	216837-2	1.15
63	3	"Squizzy Takes Charge"	Andrew Prowse	Jeff Truman	4 August 2013	216837-3	0.86
64	4	"Squizzy Breaks Some Hearts"	Andrew Prowse	Jeff Truman	11 August 2013	216837-4	0.77
65	5	"Squizzy Tempts Fate"	Karl Zwicky	Andy Muir	18 August 2013	216837-5	0.73
66	6	"Squizzy Makes the Front Page"	Karl Zwicky	Adam Todd	25 August 2013	216837-6	0.78
67	7	"Squizzy Loses the Plot"	Shawn Seet	Adam Todd	1 September 2013	216837-7	0.49
68	8	"Squizzy Cooks a Goose"	Shawn Seet	Paul Gawler	1 September 2013	216837-8	0.38

== Ratings ==
Underbelly series : AUS viewers per episode (millions)

Season	Episode number												
Season	1	2	3	4	5	6	7	8	9	10	11	12	13
1	1.249	1.324	1.273	1.249	1.224	1.233	1.271	1.195	1.219	1.247	1.237	1.344	1.417
2	2.582	2.397	2.476	2.334	2.233	2.267	2.174	2.069	2.126	1.826	1.803	1.705	2.078
3	2.237	2.071	1.921	1.500	1.677	1.613	1.645	1.650	1.672	1.598	1.384	1.493	1.800
4	2.794	2.084	1.760	1.550	1.461	1.408	1.397	1.290	1.282	1.336	1.237	1.296	1.449
5	1.780	1.230	1.040	0.990	1.030	1.010	0.480	0.860	–				
6	1.680	1.150	0.860	0.770	0.730	0.780	0.490	0.380	–				

Source: Audience measurement performed by OzTam

== See also ==
=== Telemovies ===
- Underbelly Files: Tell Them Lucifer was Here
- Underbelly Files: Infiltration
- Underbelly Files: The Man Who Got Away
- Underbelly Files: Chopper

=== Spin-offs ===
- Underbelly NZ: Land of the Long Green Cloud
- Fat Tony & Co.
- Informer 3838
