= Jason Montgomery (actor) =

Australian actor (active 1996– )

- Education: MacGregor State High School (1989–1990); National Institute of Dramatic Art (1993–1995)
- Occupation: Actor
- Years active: 1996–
- Notable work: Underbelly: Badness

Jason Montgomery is an Australian actor.

== Early life / education ==
Montgomery undertook studies in Acting, Music and Dance at the Centre of Artistic Development at Brisbane's MacGregor State High School from 1989 to 1990.

He was accepted into Sydney's National Institute of Dramatic Art (NIDA) in 1993, graduating in 1995 with a Bachelor of Dramatic Arts (Acting).

== Career ==
After graduating from NIDA, Montgomery's first professional theatre role was as Cosimo de’ Medici in a 1996 Sydney Theatre Company production of Bertolt Brecht'a Life of Galileo at the Sydney Opera House. That same year, he landed television guest roles in ABC police procedural drama series Police Rescue opposite Gary Sweet and UK comedy series Hale and Pace. Further guest roles followed in Big Sky and crime drama Wildside, before he played the role of Lorenzo in a 1999 Bell Shakespeare staging of The Merchant of Venice.

In the early 2000s, Montgomery landed guest roles in medical drama All Saints, docudrama Australians at War, children's series Don't Blame the Koalas, satirical comedy show CNNNN, police drama White Collar Blue, sketch comedy series Comedy Inc, Monologues and long-running soap opera Home and Away. In 2008, guest roles continued in The Strip, and Out of the Blue, followed by appearances in Rake, opposite Richard Roxburgh in 2010 and Wild Boys in 2011.

Montgomery then had a significant role as Brett 'Decker' Simpson, Anthony's henchman and hitman in the 2012 fifth season of the Underbelly crime series franchise, Underbelly: Badness. His performance saw him nominated for the 2013 Logie Award for Most Outstanding Newcomer.

In 2014, Montgomery had a recurring role as a Adam Farrell in period drama series A Place to Call Home, opposite Marta Dusseldorp. The following year, he appeared in two-part miniseries House of Hancock, alongside Sam Neill as Lang Hancock and Mandy McElhinney as Gina Rinehart. In 2016, after having previously guested on Home and Away, Montgomery had a run as villain Spike Lowe on the series.

Between acting jobs, Montogomery works as a trivia host, with his own business, 'Trivia Master'.

== Filmography ==
=== Television ===
Year	Title	Role	Notes	Ref.
1996	Hale and Pace	Hale's Son / Young Steve		
1996	Police Rescue	Hartford	2 episodes	
1997	Big Sky	Male Officer	1 episode	
1998; 1999	Wildside	Barry Armstrong / Security Guard	2 episodes	
2000; 2002	All Saints	Andrew Hale / David Sutton	2 episodes	
2001	Australians at War	Soldier	Documentary series	
2002	Don't Blame the Koalas	Dopey Reporter	1 episode	
	CNNNN	Brett Aspinall		
2003	White Collar Blue	Chris Sutton	1 episode	
	Comedy Inc	Dinner Suit Man		
	Monologues	Fireman		
2004; 2013; 2016	Home and Away	Constable Mike Jones / Patrick Kingsley / Kevin Arthur 'Spike' Lowe	14 episodes	
2008	The Strip	Shaun Douglas	1 episode	
2008	Out of the Blue	DC Brad Nash	2 episodes	
2010	Rake	Policeman #72	1 episode	
2011	Wild Boys	Sid	1 episode	
2012	Underbelly: Badness	Brett 'Decker' Simpson	8 episodes	
2014	A Place to Call Home	Adam Farrell	4 episodes	
2015	House of Hancock	Colin Pace	Miniseries, 1 episode	

=== Film ===
Year	Title	Role	Notes	Ref.
2011	Frank's Dream		Short film	
2015	Talk to Someone	Dan	Short film	

== Theatre ==
Year	Title	Role	Notes	Ref.
1993	Mother and Son	Harry	NIDA Theatre, Sydney	
1994	The Devils		NIDA Theatre, Sydney	
1994	Translations	Doalty	NIDA Theatre, Sydney	
1994	Twelfth Night	Feste	NIDA Theatre, Sydney	
1994	The Merchant of Venice	Follower to Bassanio / Jailer	NIDA Theatre, Sydney	
1994	Epsom Downs	Hugh / Jubilee Drunk / Jockey	NIDA Theatre, Sydney	
1995	Tales from the Vienna Woods	Havlitschek / Boyfriend	NIDA Theatre, Sydney	
1995	Guys and Dolls	Sky Masterson	NIDA Theatre, Sydney	
1995	Ghetto	Isrulik / Nazi	NIDA Theatre, Sydney	
1996	Life of Galileo	Cosimo de’ Medici	Sydney Opera House with STC	
1999	The Merchant of Venice	Lorenzo	Australian tour with Bell Shakespeare	
2000	The Disposal	Jess (Lead)	Old Fitzroy Theatre, Sydney	
2006	Singing the Lonely Heart	Reeves	New Theatre, Sydney	
	Dear World	Doorman / Ensemble	Australian Opera	
	Mogadishu	David	Naked Theatre Co	
	No Names, No Pack Drill	Lambert	Marian St Theatre, Sydney	
	Soldier Boy	Father	Canute Productions	
	The Starry Messenger	Rinuccino	Sydney Theatre Company	
