= Daniel Daperis =

Australian actor and director

- Born: 1988 (age 37–38); Melbourne, Victoria, Australia
- Occupations: Actor, director
- Relatives: Jared Daperis (brother)

Daniel Daperis (Greek: Ντανιέλ Δαπέρης) is an Australian actor and director. He is best known for his acting roles in the television series The Man From Snowy River and the children's television series Thunderstone. Daniel Daperis is the older brother of actor Jared Daperis. Daniel Daperis played Liam in The Saddle Club.
