= List of Miss Fisher's Murder Mysteries episodes =

Miss Fisher's Murder Mysteries is an Australian mystery drama created by Deb Cox and Fiona Eagger. The series is based on Kerry Greenwood's Phryne Fisher Murder Mystery novels. It premiered on ABC, a public television network, on 24 February 2012 with the pilot episode "Cocaine Blues". Miss Fisher's Murder Mysteries focuses on the personal and professional life of Phryne Fisher (Essie Davis), a private detective in late 1920s Melbourne. The first season, set in 1928, consisted of thirteen episodes and the second season was also thirteen episodes long, including a Christmas special. A third series, consisting of eight episodes, was commissioned in June 2014 and began airing from 8 May 2015. This show was rated a 69/100 on IGN.

== Series overview ==
Series	Episodes	Originally released	
Series	Episodes	First released	Last released
1	13	24 February 2012	18 May 2012
2	13	6 September 2013	22 December 2013
3	8	8 May 2015	26 June 2015

== Episodes ==
=== Series 1 (2012) ===
No. overall	No. in season	Title	Directed by	Written by	Original release date	Australian viewers (millions)
1	1	"Cocaine Blues"	Tony Tilse	Deb Cox	24 February 2012	1.099
In 1928, Miss Phryne Fisher returns to Melbourne after several years abroad. Shortly after her arrival, she is invited to a luncheon with John and Lydia Andrews, as well as her Aunt Prudence. She arrives at the Andrews' manor only to learn that John was found dead that morning on the bathroom floor. Lydia is quite shaken and has no idea what has happened. The police suspect foul play and it is later revealed that John was poisoned with arsenic. Phryne learns from Lydia's maid, Dorothy "Dot" Williams, that a housemaid named Alice Hartley recently left the Andrews' employment - a vital clue which soon leads to a cocaine smuggling ring and an illegal abortionist, known as "Butcher George". Dot stays with Miss Fisher, and learns to overcome her fear of electricity, including telephones. Based on the 1989 novel Cocaine Blues.
2	2	"Murder on the Ballarat Train"	Kate Dennis	Elizabeth Coleman and Deb Cox	2 March 2012	0.868
Phryne and Dot are travelling by train to Ballarat, so Phryne can collect her new Hispano-Suiza car. However, during the journey, they awaken an unconscious woman, Eunice Henderson, who was drugged with a chloroform-soaked cloth. Also, her mother, Mrs. Henderson, seems to have vanished. They soon discover Mrs. Henderson hanging from a water tower where the Ballarat Train had earlier stopped. It is found Henderson had an argument with another passenger, Andy Cotton, who blamed her for the death of his wife, who died during childbirth when Mrs. Henderson was a hospital matron. Later, a young girl named Jane is found in possession of Mrs. Henderson's jewels. Returning home to her new residence in St Kilda, Phryne analyzes the clues to try and discover who the murderer is. Based on the 1991 novel Murder on the Ballarat Train.
3	3	"The Green Mill Murder"	Kate Dennis	Michael Miller	9 March 2012	0.934
While Phryne is at the Green Mill dance hall, a man is murdered and her dance partner becomes a suspect. Phryne uses all her skills, including her ability to fly a plane, to uncover a trail of blackmail and murder. Based on the 1993 novel The Green Mill Murder.
4	4	"Death at Victoria Dock"	Tony Tilse	Shelley Birse	16 March 2012	0.951
Phryne witnesses a shooting at the docks in the middle of a strike. Consequently, she gets to learn a lot about Latvians. Based on the 1992 novel Death at Victoria Dock.
5	5	"Raisins and Almonds"	David Caesar	Michael Miller	23 March 2012	0.905
When Saul Michaels, a young man, is found dead at the Eastern Market, Phryne is plunged into the diverse worlds of Jewish politics, the hope of a Zionist State, alchemy, and poison. Miss Lee, a bookseller, falls in love with Saul, though he has a wife back in Poland, a wife with the patience to wait for them to meet in Zion. Saul appears to believes in the promise of alchemy, turning lead into gold, seeing his room above the shoe store. Inspector Robinson recognizes the chemical elements and finds the formula written in ink that appears only when heat is applied to the page Phryne and Simon discover. Dr Mac figures out what the formula is meant to do: make artificial rubber, which would be worth more than gold. Saul’s favorite poem was Raisins and Almonds; Phryne and Inspector Robinson find aconite, fatal poison, in the binding of the book with the poem; aconite is made from the root of a beautiful flower. Saul absorbed the fatal poison from a paper cut. Yossi Stein lies dead at Saul's lab table; he is another in the group of Zionists. Ben Abrahams, the shoemaker, has a son Simon, who is kidnapped. Ben's brother Chaim (owner of the building with the bookstore and uncle of Simon) wants the formula that Saul worked out and the profits it would yield -- it was Chaim's idea to make synthetic rubber. He kidnapped his own nephew, hating the passion for Zionism. Uncle Chaim killed Saul Michaels, killed Yossi, and had a try at killing Phryne when both sought the book Saul Michaels read in the bookstore. Simon and Saul wanted the profits for the new state of Zion, yet a dream. Jack Robinson has to write to Saul’s wife. While discussing the long time since Saul saw his wife, Robinson mentions his long time away from his own wife during WWI, remarking how the war changed him, that his wife now spends most of her time living with her sister, but he is still married. Based on the 1997 novel Raisins and Almonds.
6	6	"Ruddy Gore"	David Caesar	Liz Doran	30 March 2012	0.803
At a gala performance of Ruddygore, Phryne meets the gorgeous Lin Chung, who has rescued the theatre's leading man from some thugs in a dark alley. Based on the 1995 novel Ruddy Gore.
7	7	"Murder in Montparnasse"	Clayton Jacobson	Ysabelle Dean	6 April 2012	0.856
The episode opens with Bert and Cec with a friend at a bar - it is clear the three have placed a bet on a race and the bookie will not pay up. They depart the bar and are arguing in the street. A car revs its engine and drives directly toward Bert and Cec's friend, running him over before driving away. Detective Robinson investigates the case. The friend subsequently dies and Bert and Cec seeks Miss Fisher's assistance. In a parallel storyline, an old friend of Miss Fisher's arrives from Paris. The friend's late husband was an artist who died a mysterious death. The French police have reopened the case and Miss Fisher wants to help solve it. Finally, Dot is struggling with the advice of her priest to stop seeing Hugh because he is a Protestant. Based on the 2002 novel Murder in Montparnasse.
8	8	"Away with the Fairies"	Emma Freeman	Ysabelle Dean and Kelly Lefever	13 April 2012	0.972
The editor of a ladies' magazine is murdered. Based on the 2001 novel Away with the Fairies. Guest actor: Deborah Kennedy
9	9	"Queen of the Flowers"	Clayton Jacobson	Deb Cox and Jo Martino	20 April 2012	0.848
Phryne is teaching manners to a group of disadvantaged girls when one of them washes up dead on the beach. Based on the 2004 novel Queen of the Flowers. Guest actor: Danielle Cormack
10	10	"Death by Miss Adventure"	Daina Reid	Liz Doran and Chris Corbett	27 April 2012	0.829
Phryne investigates when a clothing factory worker named Daisy is killed by the factory equipment. Dot gets a job in the factory as a tea lady, handing out tea at break time. She learns of illegal overtime work. Roderick Gaskin, owner of the factory, dies and falls dramatically from an upper floor, landing in front of Dot. His death proves due to bleach added to the vial of digitalis, his heart medicine. Dr MacMillan administered it without inspecting the vial for holes. Miss Fisher gets a letter from Murdoch Foyle, the man who killed her sister, now in prison, promising to tell Phryne what happened to Janey if Phryne gets him out of jail. She visits him, but her anger stops her from making such a deal. At the factory, Hetty, the tea lady working with Dot, reveals her affection for Daisy, and her jealousy of Dr MacMillan (Mac), who also loved Daisy, a love triangle. Hetty tells Detective Robinson and Miss Fisher about Daisy and Dr MacMillan. When Joyce was out of view with her lover Ted Colgan, the key to the drawer containing the medicine vial was used by Hetty to inject the bleach, and frame Mac. Dot finds a letter from Daisy to Hetty, ending their connection, and Hetty chases Dot into the factory, where Miss Fisher and the inspector save Dot and Hetty. Daisy was killed during the illegal overtime, an accident. Mac is restored to the hospital. Phryne burns the letter from Foyle.
11	11	"Blood and Circuses"	Emma Freeman	Shelley Birse	4 May 2012	0.877
Phryne goes undercover at the circus to investigate the death of Miss Christopher, a magician's assistant and a hermaphrodite. Phryne is the beautiful woman who stands at the board while the expert throws knives around her on the board. While examining the box used for the disappearing woman trick, she recalls that she watched that trick, totally mesmerised by it, when her sister Janey disappeared. The strongman Samson, really Seth, remembers the young Phryne from when he let her and her sister sneak in, and is her guide into the circus. Murdoch Foyle escapes prison as part of a plot with Matthew Tizzard, the son of Elsie, an old woman regularly picked up by Jack Robinson. They took a tranquilizer that makes them appear dead, and thus leave in caskets. Tizzard escaped the casket outside prison, leaving weights inside it to fool those burying it. Hugh is shot in the leg by Tizzard when he escorts the mother home. Miss Parkes of the circus is freed from blame in the murder of Miss Christopher. Senior Sergeant Grossmith is in cahoots with the prison escape and he is caught. Tizzard is sent back to prison after greeting his mother. Jack Robinson learns that Foyle's mother, on learning her son died in prison, asked that his body be cremated, not buried, leaving no threat to Phryne. She tells Jack she knows when her sister disappeared, having remembered that scene. Based on the 1994 novel Blood and Circuses. Guest actors: Joel Tobeck, John Wood, Aaron Jeffery
12	12	"Murder in the Dark"	Daina Reid	Ysabelle Dean	11 May 2012	0.857
Phryne investigates when a member of her aunt's staff is murdered two days before the engagement party for one of Phryne's cousins. Meanwhile, Dot pursues hints that Murdoch Foyle is still alive. Based on the 2006 novel Murder in the Dark.
13	13	"King Memses' Curse"	Daina Reid	Deb Cox and Elizabeth Coleman	18 May 2012	0.903
As Phryne and associates follow up on a business card clue left by Foyle in Bert and Cec's taxi, they enter a world of Ancient Egyptian-inspired mysticism and murder, where Foyle remains at large and dangerous. Jack is ambushed and knocked out from behind by Foyle; he awakens bound and gagged in an underground tomb leading him to thrash around wildly in a panic trying to escape. Meanwhile, Phryne continues to follow the trail of clues and to investigate Foyle. She does it on her own and is trying to track him down, but he seems to always be one step ahead of her. She chases after him after seeing him but ends up meeting an array of booby traps set up by him on the way and he gets away. Phryne is battling booby traps and dodging hidden arrows from all around her and still has no idea Jack is tied up. How will the two ever stop Foyle when he is so clever?

=== Series 2 (2013) ===
Miss Fisher's Murder Mysteries was renewed by the ABC for a second series on 26 July 2012. The second series is based on Greenwood's novels Dead Man's Chest, Unnatural Habits and various short stories. Cox commented that she and Eagger were "thrilled" that many of the cast and crew from the first series were returning.

No. overall	No. in season	Title	Directed by	Written by	Original release date	Australian viewers (millions)
14	1	"Murder Most Scandalous"	Tony Tilse	Kristen Dunphy	6 September 2013	0.852
When Deputy Commissioner George Sanderson (played by Neil Melville), Jack's ex-father-in-law, is implicated in the murder of a gentlemen's club hostess, Jack becomes determined to clear his name. He also has to deal with the reappearance of his estranged wife, Rosie (played by Dee Smart). Meanwhile, Phryne tries to perfect her fan dance, so she can go undercover at a gentleman's club run by Madam Lyon.
15	2	"Death Comes Knocking"	Ken Cameron	Ysabelle Dean	13 September 2013	0.827
Aunt Prudence asks famous psychic Mrs Bolkonsky to contact her dead godson, Roland, leaving Phryne to believe something is amiss. Her friend Freddy Ashmead cannot remember what happened the day Roland died, while a grave digger is murdered when someone tries to break into Roland's grave.
16	3	"Dead Man's Chest"	Ken Cameron	John Banas	20 September 2013	0.729
Phryne, Aunt Prudence, Jane and Dot travel to the seaside town of Queenscliff to stay with Prudence's old friend, Hilly McNaster. Phryne is intrigued when Hilly's son, Gerald, reveals that their holiday mansion has been burgled and two of her staff have gone missing. When a body is later found on the beach, Phryne asks Jack for help in solving the case. Based on the 2010 novel Dead Man's Chest.
17	4	"Deadweight"	Declan Eames	John Banas	27 September 2013	0.806
Phryne and Dot investigate the murder of a boxer.
18	5	"Murder A La Mode"	Sian Davies	Kristen Dunphy	4 October 2013	0.926
Phryne and Dot are trying on clothes at the House of Fleuri when the body of Frances Wilde, the main investor in the business, is found on the premises shortly after her murder, with one expensive pearl in her spilled blood. The short list of suspects includes the victim's much younger husband, Madame Fleuri and her sister, the seamstress Violet, and Genevieve, the House model. The list of suspects is shortened further when Violet is later found dead. At an afternoon at a spa to catch up on local gossip, Phryne and the police uncover a string of jewel thefts in Melbourne and also in Sydney. Phryne drops hints at Fleuri's that she will be away for the weekend, leaving her expensive emerald necklace at home. She and Jack Robinson await the break-in, discovering Genevieve, the House model and not French at all, as the thief and murderer. She mailed the stolen jewels to France, so they never showed up for resale in Australia. Madame Fleuri thinks her business is ruined, but Phryne encourages her to carry the designs her sister pursues, for the prêt-à-porter market, that is, ready made, more modern in design, and slightly less expensive. Phryne has time left over to walk the fashion runway, after Dot.
19	6	"Marked For Murder"	Declan Eames	John Banas	11 October 2013	0.896
When the football team captain is found dead, hanging with the opposing team's scarf around his neck, both Phryne and Jack are asked to investigate, which is complicated by the presence of Jack's ex-wife.
20	7	"Blood At The Wheel"	Sian Davies	Michelle Offen	18 October 2013	0.912
When Gertrude "Gerty" Haynes (played by Annie Stanford) is found dead behind the wheel of her racing car, Jack initially believes that the death was accidental. This suggestion is rejected by Phryne and Gertrude's brother Claude, a fellow racer. Their belief that there is some other explanation for Gerty's death is later supported by post-mortem results which indicate that she was strangled. Phryne and Dot immerse themselves in the world of race car driving to uncover the truth. This episode was dedicated to writer Mia Tolhurst.
21	8	"The Blood of Juana the Mad"	Peter Andrikidis	John Banas	25 October 2013	0.890
Dr. Mac asks Phryne and Jack to work together when the body of Professor Katz turns up in an anatomy lecture. While trying to solve the murder, Phryne and Jack also investigate the disappearance of a valuable manuscript.
22	9	"Framed For Murder"	Peter Andrikidis	Chris Corbett	1 November 2013	0.912
When the lead actor for a film that Phryne is backing is found dead, she is asked to investigate.
23	10	"Death On The Vine"	Catherine Millar	Chris Corbett	8 November 2013	0.856
Phryne and Dot are asked to investigate mysterious photos by the owner of a vineyard; when they arrive, they find their client is dead, in a town full of people who do not want them to investigate, harming them at every turn. When the client's brother tries to expedite the burning of the body, Phryne calls Detective Robinson for aid. Solving the murder uncovers the earlier murder of the client’s father, in the painful aftermath of the Great War. Dot is engaged to be married.
24	11	"Dead Air"	Catherine Millar	Ysabelle Dean and Mia Tolhurst	15 November 2013	0.874
When a radio presenter is murdered, Phryne is asked to investigate, and meets a familiar face - Jack - at the radio station. Jack is investigating Undercover why so many Radio stations had accidents after receiving threats.
25	12	"Unnatural Habits"	Tony Tilse	Ysabelle Dean	22 November 2013	0.908
Dot and Hugh find a girl's body floating in the river, which brings them and Phryne to discover a human trafficking ring.
26	13	"Murder Under the Mistletoe"	Tony Tilse	Elizabeth Coleman	22 December 2013	0.969
Dot, Mac, Phryne and Aunt Prudence travel to the Australian Alps for a skiing vacation and to celebrate Christmas in July, and because Prudence wants to sell off the family interest in the closed gold mine. Soon they find the other guests, and themselves, being targeted by a mysterious murderer.

=== Series 3 (2015) ===
No. overall	No. in season	Title	Directed by	Written by	Original release date	Australian viewers (millions)
27	1	"Death Defying Feats"	Tony Tilse	Elizabeth Coleman	8 May 2015	1.071
A magician's assistant, Pearl, is beheaded on stage after someone tampered with the trick guillotine at the MacKenzie magic show. Phryne's estranged father, the Henry, Baron of Rich(mond) pays her a visit; he is financing the magic show, though he is short on funds. Ten years earlier, MacKenzie's wife Millie drowned in a trick to escape her husband. She returns to Australia after her second husband died in France. Her twin sister remains with the magic show. To flush out the murderer of Pearl, Phryne agrees to perform in the mermaid's water tank trick. The twin sister Eva pulls the lockpick hidden in Phryne's hat just as the trick begins, yet Phryne escapes using her back up lockpick. Eva is arrested for murder.
28	2	"Murder & the Maiden"	Tony Tilse	Ysabelle Dean	15 May 2015	1.006
A woman is found dead near a RAAF base, while Phryne is investigating claims of sabotage and a missing officer for the Air Force. Autopsy shows the woman died of the poison ricin in cigarettes, a death over several days. Her identity is unknown, until her clothes lead to the seamstress who made them, working at a local club where immigrant Russians meet. The air force officer flew with Phryne during the war, and saved her life once, which creates tensions with Jack Robinson. The rumours at the base were that one now-missing officer was having a homosexual affair with another officer. After Hugh suggests a disused sentry box on the base as the door which might be unlocked by the key found with the woman's body, he and Robinson find military clothes discarded there, leading to the notion that the dead woman had worn that uniform. The base realises the breach, creating a tense scene between the police and the base officers, called off by air force. Hugh and Jack Robinson then proceed to Dr Mac for a second look at the body, and realise she had been using make-up on her face to look more like a man, so she could fly planes, her main goal in life. She was murdered by one of the air force staff, a man who could not bear the rumours of a homosexual romance, giving him the motive to kill her slowly with the poison in her cigarettes. He is arrested. Meanwhile, the dressmaker is a Russian woman without legal papers, her family lost in the revolution in Russia. She has an appointment that Phryne keeps in her place, to draw out the people trying to kill her. A single man and a group show up separately with guns at the airfield. The group is taken quickly, but the lone man keeps shooting and running. Phryne chases him with a plane, flying low, while Jack Robinson gets on a motorcycle to ride out to the culprit, finally catching him. Hugh and Dot had some rough spots during the investigation; at the end, they set a date for their wedding.
29	3	"Murder & Mozzarella"	Peter Andrikidis	Chris Corbett	22 May 2015	0.988
While Dot and Hugh are speaking to Dot's priest, Nonna Louisa, the chef at an excellent restaurant, is strangled. Phryne and Jack look at two feuding restaurants for the murderer. The Camorra, a ruthless Italian gang, is involved, by forcing both restaurants to pay high prices for tomatoes. Autopsy of Louisa reveals that she died from eating poisonous mushrooms, not the ones she used in the dish she was cooking, but those in her breakfast. Hugh has agreed to convert to Dot's religion so they can marry. The grandparents in each family running the two restaurants came from the same village in Italy, and many in the two families fall in love with the wrong person, per family expectations, feeding a feud. Concetta loves Jack Robinson, but her father will marry her to Roberto, a hired killer who plays both families. Marianna, granddaughter of Louisa, and Vincenzo are in love. Louisa discovered this and was sending her to Italy. Both confess to giving the mushrooms to Louisa, but Marianna did the deed. Marianna reveals that a man came every Thursday to Louisa, when she paid out from her personal account -- it was Roberto. Concetta decides that Jack Robinson is already taken, and leaves him to Miss Fisher. Dot's priest modifies his words to Hugh about a Catholic marriage, saying the church must allow for changing times as the role of the woman.
30	4	"Blood & Money"	Peter Andrikidis	Belinda Chayko	29 May 2015	0.968
Phryne investigates the world of street urchins when a young boy, Paddy, hires her to find his missing brother Ned. Two homeless boys are found murdered, boys in the same street gang. The Ladies Auxiliary of the hospital is deciding on which projects to fund; one doctor is advancing ways to help men injured in the war. Hugh wants a promotion, more pay, so that he and Dot will not need to live in his parents home after marriage, as his mother threw him out for converting to Catholicism, but he does not tell Dot. He does finally tell his boss, Jack Robinson. He is afraid Dot will back away from the marriage if he cannot get things straight. A veteran under treatment for burns all over his body is then found dead from too much morphine. His latest skin graft did not take, putting him in great pain. Phryne figures out that the skin grafts are coming from someone else, as the veteran's body is totally burned. The doctor took the grafts from the boys, paying them. When he got angry at them, he killed them; one boy did not take his sulfa before the skin graft. The boys live on the street, so it was a lot to expect. Phryne is disgusted at the waste of an otherwise brilliant mind when the doctor is arrested for the murders. She finds Ned, and feeds him some meals as she has been doing for Paddy. Paddy persuades Ned to get a job, as he has earned the support of Detective Robinson.
31	5	"Death & Hysteria"	Mat King	Ysabelle Dean	5 June 2015	0.954
Phryne's Aunt Prudence opens her home to the psychiatrist Dr Haydon Samuels, who treated her son Arthur before he died, and allows him to conduct his sanatorium for 'hysterical', wealthy women. Patient Betsey Cohen is found murdered by electrocution in her room. Aunt Prudence calls the police and then Phryne, who arrives with Dot. Hugh is away, replaced by another constable. Dr Samuels was chastised by the medical board three weeks earlier; Jemima Littleton, daughter of the chair of the board, is among the sanatorium patients. Phryne finds an electric device, a percussor, made by Dr Perkins in the conservatory; its wires had been tampered with, explaining Betsey Cohen's death. Dr Samuels reveals that his patients were under threat of hysterectomy as the cure for their problems, and Dr Samuels finds that ridiculous. Harriet Edwards handles the accounts for Samuels, and her brother is his lawyer. Dr Perkins seeks a patent for his device, and he took some of the funds Samuels has accumulated as donations. Dr Littleton gets Samuels struck off as a physician. Jemima threatens to jump from high on Prudence's house, but Phryne talks her back inside. Harriet is found dead by strychnine. Phryne realises that Edwards damaged the wires to the percussor; then he killed his own sister, with whom he had incestuous relations, because Dr Samuels told her it was wrong to do. Jemima had witnessed them in the bathroom. Before Samuels leaves for Switzerland, Phryne and the others have a small gathering with Arthur's favorite foods and songs, which lets Prudence cry for her lost son.
32	6	"Death at the Grand"	Mat King	Chris Corbett	12 June 2015	0.999
When hotel concierge Frank McNab falls to his death, the police find Phryne's bag and her father at the center of the murder. Dot is wooed by the temporary constable, Neville Martin, but she tells him she is true to Hugh. Lord Henry Fisher, a Baron, was supposed to be aboard ship to England after wiring substantial money to his wife in England. Though Phryne watched her father board the ship, he returned to the Hotel Grand, where he proposed to his wife during a waltz, with all the money. He then loses it in a poker game. He used Phryne's bag to hold the money in the safe of the Hotel Grand. Karol Valenski and his associate ran a scheme for cheating at poker, uncovered by Phryne and Jack Robinson. The owner of the hotel had been in love with the concierge, who rejected her shortly before he was murdered; she was the dealer in the poker games. Phryne plays poker with Valenski, blocking the view of her cards, and wins back his money and her father's IOU for his losses. Valenski then threatens Lord Fisher, who pulls out a weapon. Enid, lady friend to Lord Fisher and hotel maid, leaves with a suitcase. A man chases and kills her as she escapes, dropping Lord Fisher's passport as he runs because Phryne is shooting at him. The suitcase has the money from the hotel safe, which the maid found in the laundry after McNab tossed it down the laundry chute before his death. Phryne stops her father and Valenski in the midst of a duel at dawn. The man who killed Enid grabs Dot and Aunt Prudence at Phryne's home. She returns home to find that man aiming a gun at her, with her household bound and gagged. The man had an argument with Lord Fisher in England during the war. He tells Phryne everything she has is really his and is about to reveal the dispute with her father, when Jack Robinson knocks him out. The man, responsible for both murders, is unconscious, and her father will not explain the dispute. Phryne sends Bert and Cec with her father to be certain he is on the next ship to England. Then she and Jack waltz.
33	7	"Game, Set & Murder"	Daina Reid	Elizabeth Coleman	19 June 2015	0.932
Phryne hosts a tennis tournament to raise money for female tennis players at her Aunt Prudence's mansion. Belinda Rosewell, the practice partner of Constance, a rising tennis star, dies at the start of the tournament. Belinda was killed by the bite of a spider, in her shoe. Constance had been pregnant by another man, Terrence, and told no one, giving the baby up. She married Stanley Burrows before returning too soon to the competitive circuit. Photos taken surreptitiously reveal a problem that Constance has; her body is still producing milk, staining her clothes. Constance killed Belinda, who had the photos and knew that Constance had that baby. Constance wants only to play tennis; she cut her own career short. The murder investigation reveals Phryne's hidden fear; she cannot tolerate spiders.
34	8	"Death Do Us Part"	Daina Reid	Kris Wyld	26 June 2015	1.004
When a prize-winning scientist, Quentin, is found murdered on the same night the man intent on murdering Henry Fisher escapes police custody, Phryne and Dot work every step with Jack Robinson and Hugh. Dr Mac's autopsy reveals that the scientist was killed with polonium, a highly poisonous radioactive substance, put in his eye drops. Another contender for the scientific prize, Osman Ofendi is killed as he is phoning Miss Fisher to tell her where her father is being held, after he slipped out of her house. Phryne realises that her father's cousin Eugene, the prior holder of the barony, went missing in the war, never found. He appeared in Henry Fisher's life again, wanting a lot of money, more than the thousands Henry has given him, and as much as the cash prize for the top scientist. Dot is working in the room where the institute's safe holds the money. She jumps under a table when she hears Eugene pulling Henry at gunpoint. Phryne, Jack and Hugh are close behind. Phryne takes the money out of the safe and tosses it to Eugene, a man wrecked by that war. By careful distraction, they get Eugene on the floor, and Jack Robinson arrests him for murdering the second scientist. The polonium was used by Logan, as his wife was killed from the job of painting dials on watches so they glow, bad science by Quentin, so he too is arrested. Henry's wife has told him she will file for a formal separation if he does not return with their own funds. Henry's ship has sailed, literally, the ship to England. Phryne decides to fly her father home in her small plane, as the only sure way to get him there. Dot decides to have the wedding that evening, so Phryne can be there. She wears a stylish white gown with a long train; as she prepares at home, Hugh is with Father O'Leary, calming him by getting him to understand that science is part of God's plan. They marry in the Catholic church, very happy, with the bells ringing as they leave. The next morning, Henry winds the propeller on the plane and climbs in. Jack Robinson arrives at the runway; Phryne asks him to pursue her, two times. He is smiling as father and daughter fly away.
