= Small Time Gangster =

- Genre: Crime, Comedy
- Created by: Gareth Calverley & Joss King
- Starring: Steve Le Marquand; Sacha Horler; Gia Carides; Gary Sweet
- Country of origin: Australia
- Original language: English
- No. of seasons: 1
- No. of episodes: 8

Production
- Executive producer: Ewan Burnett
- Producers: Andrew McInally & Gareth Calverley
- Production locations: Melbourne, Aust.
- Running time: 8 x 25 min

Original release
- Network: Movie Extra
- Release: 19 April – 31 May 2011

Small Time Gangster is an Australian comedy series produced by Boilermaker-Burberry Entertainment for Movie Extra subscription television channel. It also screened on SBS One in 2013.

The series follows the adventures of Tony Piccolo, a man who works hard to support his wife Cathy and two kids. While they think he's cleaning carpets, his real profession is as an underworld enforcer, a brutal standover man.

== Cast ==
- Steve Le Marquand as Tony Piccolo
- Sacha Horler as Cathy Piccolo
- Geoff Morrell as Les
- Gia Carides as Darlene
- Gary Sweet as Barry Donald
- Fletcher Humphrys as Steve
- Jared Daperis as Charlie Donald
- Nicole Gulasekharam as Melanie Piccolo
- Samuel Johnson as Gary
- Sean Rees-Wemyss as Matthew Piccolo
- Jacek Koman as Artie
- Kevin Hofbauer as Dean
- Nicki Paull as Janet
- Tony Nikolakopoulos as Glen

== Episodes ==
No.	Title	Directed by	Written by	Original release date
1	"Jingle Bells"	Jeffrey Walker	Joss King & Gareth Calverley	19 April 2011
Tony Piccolo is a regular family man making an honest living as a suburban carpet cleaner. But his wife Cathy and children, Melanie and Matthew, don't know that Tony has a secret double life as a ruthless underworld enforcer, roughing people up when they don't pay their debts to the big boss. Looking forward to Christmas at home with his family, Tony receives a text message from work telling him he has a job to do. Hopes of the quiet Christmas fade, especially when he finds out that the low-life bum he needs to collect payments from is his friend, Artie.
2	"The Yips"	Unknown	Unknown	19 April 2011
Tony is given a new apprentice, Barry's wide-eyed, rookie son Charlie, and must show him the ropes as they try to take down a sleazy porn dealer. Still distracted and disturbed by visions of Artie's death, Tony has seriously lost his nerve and has trouble following through on the job.
3	"Dangerous Talk"	Unknown	Unknown	26 April 2011
Collecting from a low-life client, Tony's nerves desert him again, leading to an unwise confession. Meanwhile, Cathy's friendship with Brent takes a new turn when he shows up at a family BBQ.
4	"Who Got the RPG?"	Unknown	Unknown	3 May 2011
5	"Suburban Beatdown"	Unknown	Unknown	10 May 2011
6	"The Last Post"	Unknown	Unknown	17 May 2011
7	"Stand and Deliver"	Unknown	Unknown	24 May 2011
8	"Vengeance"	Unknown	Unknown	31 May 2011

== See also ==
- List of Australian television series
- Mr Inbetween
