= Underbelly: Squizzy =

- Lead actor Jared Daperis as Squizzy Taylor
- No. of episodes: 8

Release
- Original network: Nine Network
- Original release: 28 July – 1 September 2013

Series chronology
- ← Previous; Badness Next → Vanishing Act

Underbelly: Squizzy, the sixth series of the Australian Nine Network reality crime drama series anthology Underbelly, originally aired from 28 July 2013 to 1 September 2013. It is an eight-part series based on the life and career of notorious Melbourne gangster, Squizzy Taylor, and is set between 1915 and 1927. It premiered on 28 July 2013. The series began its production in late 2012, with filming commencing towards the end of 2012. It is the second series in the franchise after Badness not to have 13 episodes and the first series to be fully set in Melbourne since Underbelly.

== Premise ==
The sixth series of Underbelly depicts the rise and fall of one of Australia's most notorious 20th-century gangsters, Squizzy Taylor. It shows how Taylor became one of the most feared criminals in Melbourne at the time and his eventual death, which was also depicted in Underbelly: Razor. Justin Rosniak, who played Taylor in Razor, does not reprise his role in the new series; instead Jared Daperis has taken on the role.

== Cast ==
=== Main ===
- Jared Daperis as Joseph Theodore Leslie 'Squizzy' Taylor
- Camille Keenan as Dolly Grey
- Susie Porter as Rosie Taylor
- Ashley Zukerman as Detective James Bruce
- Luke Ford as Albert 'Tankbuster' McDonald
- Dan Wyllie as Detective Frederick Piggott
- Ken Radley as Detective John Brophy
- Nathan Page as Henry Stokes
- Diana Glenn as Annie Stokes
- Matt Boesenberg as John "Snowy" Cutmore
- Gracie Gilbert as Ida Pender
- Andrew Ryan as Angus 'Gus' Murray
- Richard Cawthorne as 'Long Harry' Slater
- Ian Dixon as Ted Whiting
- Sam Greco as Sam 'Bunny' Whiting
- Elise Jansen as Lorna Kelly
- Greg Fleet as Richard Buckley
- Jackson Ezard as Hugh Hanlon
- Peter Moon as Leo
- Jane Allsop as Lady Margaret Stanley
- Fletcher Humphrys as Edward Jenkins
- Victoria Eagger as Watch House Matron

== Episodes ==
No. overall	No. in series	Title	Directed by	Written by	Original release date	Prod. code	Aus. viewers (millions)
61	1	"Squizzy Steps Out"	David Caesar	Felicity Packard	28 July 2013	216837-1	1.68
Squizzy makes a name for himself with a jewelry store robbery dressed in woman's clothes, pickpocketing and sly-grog selling but when he plans to hold up a bank manager, things don't go quite as smoothly.
62	2	"Squizzy Puts One Over"	David Caesar	Felicity Packard	28 July 2013	216837-2	1.15
To get off a murder charge, Squizzy and his boys will have to persuade a few witnesses. Squizzy plans an even more daring crime with the inner circle of the Bourke Street Rats and keep building his empire by getting in bed with Long Harry Slater.
63	3	"Squizzy Takes Charge"	Andrew Prowse	Jeff Truman	4 August 2013	216837-3	0.86
Squizzy plots his rise to the top of Melbourne's underworld by triggering a gang war between Henry Stokes and "Long Harry" Slater. Dolly becomes heartbroken when Squizzy falls in love with a starstruck waitress. Snowy Cutmore betrays Squizzy after figuring out that Squizzy had him shot at by a disfigured Aussie digger.
64	4	"Squizzy Breaks Some Hearts"	Andrew Prowse	Jeff Truman	11 August 2013	216837-4	0.77
Henry Stokes returns from Tasmania unexpectedly, furious at how Squizzy has run his businesses into the ground. Squizzy throws a lavish party for him to heal the rift but shortly afterwards Stokes is arrested for possession of stolen property. The little general brazenly intimidates a judge and Stokes gets off the charge. Squizzy takes to the racetrack and gives thought to an honest career but the old habits die hard.
65	5	"Squizzy Tempts Fate"	Karl Zwicky	Andy Muir	18 August 2013	216837-5	0.73
Needing time to regroup, Squizzy finds himself drawn back to the arms of Lorna but after a night with her, Squizzy realises he was wrong and return to Ida. Ida's inexperience in criminal matters lands both herself and Tankbuster in gaol, which inevitably threatens her lover Squizzy's freedom.
66	6	"Squizzy Makes the Front Page"	Karl Zwicky	Adam Todd	25 August 2013	216837-6	0.78
Detective Bruce befriends pregnant Lorna and tries to convince her to turn her husband in. She may be devastated by Squizzy's disappearance and the fact he's taken a lover, but she won't tell. Ida's loyalty reconfirmed, the police's case in disarray and with a film to be made, Squizzy decides to turn himself in, convinced he can beat any court case. Squizzy arrives at police headquarters, on his own terms, with a contingent of press to witness the event. As he predicts he is immediately bailed but he discovers there's a price to fame when a former admirer turned stalker guns him down in the street. Squizzy survives but the film is cancelled, the government censor bans it in the public interest for its unsavoury association with Squizzy.
67	7	"Squizzy Loses the Plot"	Shawn Seet	Adam Todd	1 September 2013	216837-7	0.49
The old gang is reunited when Squizzy and Tank break Angus out of jail. Angus finds himself facing the hangman's noose after a botched bank robbery.
68	8	"Squizzy Cooks a Goose"	Shawn Seet	Paul Gawler	1 September 2013	216837-8	0.38
After a brutal six months in jail for harbouring Angus, Squizzy's attempts to go straight fall short when Long Harry Slater returns to Melbourne and offers him work in the cocaine business. Snowy Cutmore also returns to Melbourne which leads to a fatal confrontation between the former friends.

== Viewership ==
Episode	Title	Original airdate	Overnight Viewers	Nightly Rank	Consolidated Viewers	Adjusted Rank
1	"Squizzy Steps Out"	28 July 2013	1.68	4	1.73	4
2	"Squizzy Put One Over"	28 July 2013	1.15	7	1.27	7
3	"Squizzy Takes Charge"	4 August 2013	0.86	8	0.97	7
4	"Squizzy Breaks Some Hearts"	11 August 2013	0.77	9	0.73	12
5	"Squizzy Tempts Fate"	18 August 2013	0.73	12	0.71	14
6	"Squizzy Makes The Front Page"	25 August 2013	0.78	10	0.73	14
7	"Squizzy Loses The Plot"	1 September 2013	0.49	16	0.64	14
8	"Squizzy Cooks A Goose"	1 September 2013	0.38	20	0.51	17

== Novelisation ==
Andy Muir, one of the screenwriters of the series, wrote the novelisation Underbelly Squizzy which was due to be published by Allen & Unwin Australia in July 2013.
