= Underbelly: Badness =

- No. of episodes: 8

Release
- Original network: Nine Network
- Original release: 13 August – 1 October 2012

Series chronology
- ← Previous; Razor Next → Squizzy

Underbelly: Badness, the fifth series of the Nine Network crime drama series Underbelly, originally aired from 13 August 2012 to 1 October 2012. It is an eight-part series detailing real events that occurred in Sydney between 2001 and 2012. The series began its production in early 2012 and towards the middle of the year filming eventually commenced. A teaser clip for the series was released by the Nine Network indicating the core cast of the series. Caroline Craig returns to narrate the series for a fifth time.

== Premise ==
The fifth season of Underbelly depicted the criminal activities of recently convicted Australian kidnapper, murderer and drug-dealer Anthony Perish's (aka "Rooster") criminal activities around the Sydney suburb of Lindfield and adjacent areas and how the New South Wales Police 'Strike Force Tuno' finally apprehended him after almost a decade of intensive surveillance and informant information.

Anthony "Rooster" Perish would never have been caught if it was not for the dedication and perseverance of New South Wales police officer Det. Insp. Gary Jubelin. The series covers the scope and breadth of homicide, kidnapping, firearm offences and drug dealing committed under the direction of Anthony Perish, his brother Andrew Perish, various other criminal associates and several criminal Australian "motorcycle clubs."

== Cast ==
=== Main cast ===
- Matt Nable as Detective Gary Jubelin, head of Strike Force Tuno
- Jonathan LaPaglia as Anthony Perish, ruthless underworld boss with no recorded history and murderer of Terry Falconer
- Ben Winspear as Detective Tim Browne, second-in-command of Tuno
- Josh Quong Tart as Andrew 'Undies' Perish, brother of Anthony Perish
- Jason Montgomery as Brett 'Decker' Simpson, Anthony's henchman and hitman
- Ella Scott Lynch as Senior Constable Camille Alavoine, Police analyst of Tuno
- Justin Smith as Matthew 'Muzz' Lawton Anthony's right-hand man
- Aaron Jeffery as Frank 'Tink' O'Rourke, Strike Force Tuno's informant

=== Recurring and guest cast ===
- Goran D. Kleut as Jasper Pengilly, Leader of the Living Dead Motorcycle Club
- Jodi Gordon as Kylie Keogh, police media officer assisting Tuno
- P.J. Lane as Michael Christiansen, Steroid using associate of Decker
- Leeanna Walsman as Detective Pam Young
- Steven Vidler as Police Commander Howard
- Luke Bovino as Vito Russo, Decker's associate
- Geordie Robinson as Craig 'Schiz' Bottin, Drug Cook and Decker's associate
- Sophie Webb as Lauren Perish, Andrew Perish's wife
- Hollie Andrew as Tracy Shepperd, Psychologist & Gary Jubelin's girlfriend
- Zara Michales as Pippa, Frank O'Rourke's girlfriend
- Luke Pegler as Detective Luke Rankin
- Abby Earl as Karina
- Tiriel Mora as ATO Officer

== Production ==
On 17 April 2012, a reporter for The Sydney Morning Herald announced filming had begun on the fifth instalment of the Underbelly series in Sydney. Underbelly: Badness is set from 2001-2012 and tells the story of "underworld figure" Anthony Perish and the team of police who helped bring him to justice. Jo Rooney, the Nine Network's drama executive, stated "Underbelly: Badness is a riveting and compelling story of a modern underworld figure that merged into the fabric of our community completely under the radar, and we are very proud to shine a light on this story and bring it to Australian audiences." The eight-part series was directed by Tony Tilse, David Caesar and Ian Watson.

== Episodes ==
No. overall	No. in series	Title	Directed by	Written by	Original release date	Prod. code	Aus. viewers (millions)
53	1	"Thy Will Be Done"	Tony Tilse	Felicty Packard	13 August 2012	210752-1	1.78
When Terry Falconer is abducted and murdered while on prison day release on 17 November 2001, the New South Wales police embark on a man-hunt to find his killers after Falconer's remains are discovered in the Hastings River, near Port Macquarie. Over the course of a decade, their investigation leads them to Anthony Perish, a criminal motorcycle gang member and drug dealer who eluded previous scrutiny from the police and the non-criminal world.
54	2	"Cut Snake and Crazy"	Tony Tilse	Felicity Packard	20 August 2012	210752-2	1.23
Task Force Tuno become frustrated by the lack of progress with the Terry Falconer murder case. Although they are aware that Anthony Perish is involved, Perish has been assiduous in avoiding official documentation that would enable law enforcement or other government agencies to use the information for surveillance purposes. Former Ironbloods Motorcycle Club member Frank O'Rourke turns police informant. Senior Constable Camille Alavoine joins Task Force Tuno and rapidly becomes an asset to her colleagues. Perish gang associates try to kill Gary Mack and Perish becomes aware that Tuno has an informant after identikit facial reconstructions of the Perish brothers are published within New South Wales newspapers.
55	3	"The Loaded Dog"	David Caesar	Peter Gawler	27 August 2012	210752-3	1.04
In September 2002, New South Wales newspapers disclose the faces of Anthony and Andrew Perish. Frank O'Rourke agrees to go undercover within the Perish gang and act as an informant for Task Force Tuno. The New South Wales police hierarchy become impatient with the Task Force's lack of results. Jubelin bonds with O'Rourke, who is convinced to wear a wire during surveillance of the Perish gang's drug manufacturing facilities. Anthony Perish arranges a meeting with the Living Dead Motorcycle Club after an incident with leader Jason Pengilly's godson. He then stabs Pengilly to death, after subverting one of his senior associates. Decker is held a virtual prisoner at the Girvan property for over three months, until he has significantly improved the fortifications around the gang's headquarters and drug manufacturing lab. Anthony Perish suspects a member of his gang is an informant, but cannot identify who. O'Rourke signs an affidavit testifying to Perish and his gang's criminal activities.
56	4	"Year of the Rooster"	David Caesar	Peter Gawler	3 September 2012	210752-4	0.99
With Strike Force Tuno formally disbanded and officially shut down, Jubelin undertakes covert measures to gather further evidence on Anthony Perish and his gang, as does his former Tuno offsider Tim Browne. As Jubelin languishes at a desk job in Chatwood, Browne continues to be involved in homicide inquiries amidst a series of other anti-crime police task forces and one day, encounters additional information about Perish's activities. However, Jubelin, Browne and their colleagues are dealt a devastating blow when the Australian Federal Police launch their own official case against Perish and proceed to disclose Frank O'Rourke's actual identity as the informant who filed an affidavit against Perish and his activities. Angered at what he sees as O'Rourke's treachery, Anthony Perish vows vengeance against O'Rourke, now relocated within a witness protection scheme. Meanwhile, Jubelin's relationship with Pam, his romantic liaison, is unravelling under the strain of his covert Tuno activities.
57	5	"Troubleshooting"	Ian Watson	Niki Aken	10 September 2012	210752-5	1.03
Used car dealer Ben Dokic's life becomes a nightmare when he befriends a charming customer, otherwise known as Anthony Perish, after a highend car sale and cocaine reward. Although Perish initially befriends Dokic, Perish is becoming increasingly paranoid about police surveillance, and fears that his dog may have been poisoned. Andrew Perish tracks down Decker and forces him to rejoin the Perish gang, while the Perish brothers and Dokic visit Gold Coast entertainment venues maintained by Perish's laundered drug money. However, the New South Wales and Australian Federal Police become aware of the new relationship between Dokic and the Perish gang, although Dokic is initially oblivious to Perish's real identity until subpoenaed to appear before the AFP, where he professes ignorance. Perish becomes increasingly paranoid and intimidating, fearing that Dokic will betray him. Ultimately, Perish orders Decker to go to extreme lengths to prove his loyalty to "The Company", culminating in the murder of Dokic's wife and son- although Decker is haunted by what he has been forced to do. Dokic discloses all he knows to Jubelin, Browne and the others and despite the inadequate primary content of his information, it is enough to formally reactivate Task Force Tuno. Camille comes face-to-face with Perish, unbeknownst to her quarry, in countryside Mudgee.
58	6	"Road to Nowhere"	Ian Watson	Jeff Truman	17 September 2012	210752-6	1.01
Decker's girlfriend is now heavily pregnant and he finances his preparation for further parenthood with holdups and work for the Perish gang. Browne and Jubelin are busy with other homicides and during one, Jubelin meets Tracy, who moves in with him and bonds with his teenage children. Meanwhile, Perish's paranoia has eased and his drug production factory and distribution 'business' is booming. Andrew Perish faces financial difficulties and branches into meth lab construction, with unfortunate personal results. Meanwhile, Jubelin and Browne meet Willy Strong, a pub and nightclub bouncer who knows Decker. Anthony Perish approaches Decker at the latter's wedding with a new assignment. Suspecting that another Perish gang underworld assassination is underway, Jubelin and Browne tail Decker through Northern New South Wales and Queensland to prevent another execution. However it turns out to be a bagdrop to Anthony Perish. Back in Sydney, however, there is a DNA breakthrough- which means that Decker has now become conclusively linked to the Falconer murder, and two other Perish gang members, Vito Russo and Michael Christiansen, are also identified by a reactivated Task Force Tuno. However, switching their usual roles, Anthony Perish and "Muzz" spy on Jubelin and Browne and vow revenge against Tuno.
59	7	"Bang, Bang, Kill, Kill"	Tony Tilse	Jeff Truman	17 September 2012^{[a]}	210752-7	0.48
Unaware he is under police surveillance, Decker juggles two different hit-man contracts with the impending birth of his baby. He is forced to delegate responsibility for one such task to another Perish gang member, bodybuilder and steroid abuser, Michael Christensen. Christensen lures Peter Elliott, a corrupt business person and associate of Melbourne's Moran criminal family, to a deserted property, shooting him dead. Unfortunately for Christiansen, he is less than diligent in disposing of possible forensic blood and DNA traces from the crime scene, and New South Wales State Police locate the box in which Christiansen stored his victim's body, dumped at sea. The reactivated Strike Force Tuno has been keeping Christiansen's storage facility under surveillance since its discovery and this paid dividends in his rapid apprehension. In return for leniency, Christiansen adds further information to Dokic and O'Rourke's prior affidavits about the Perish gang. Angry at Decker's mainstream priorities, Perish arranges a meeting with Decker to discuss the delegated and bungled Elliott hit, and Strike Force Tuno are finally able to swoop down and arrest Anthony Perish and Decker as they pull guns on one another. But does Tuno have enough information to prove Anthony Perish's responsibility for Terry Falconer's abduction and murder? Meanwhile, Gary Jubelin's relationship with Tracy is placed under severe strain as he closes in on Perish and his gang.
60	8	"Strike Force Tuno"	Tony Tilse	Niki Aken	1 October 2012	210752-8	0.86
Despite Anthony's arrest, the case against the Perish gang appears to be doomed to end in minor manslaughter convictions, as the Perish brothers and accomplice Matt (Muzz) Lawton are tried for murder and conspiracy to murder. Anthony's defence counsel advocates that he pleads guilty to manslaughter, but not murder. Within Tuno, there are anxieties about whether they have amassed sufficient evidence now to potentially convict Anthony and Andrew Perish and Matthew Lawton of murder per se, and matters are complicated by Camille's disclosure that she is now battling cancer. Tragically, although her meticulous communication work was essential to the establishment of interception and surveillance in the context of the Perish gang's eventual apprehension, Camille dies from her cancer during the course of the trial and is unable to hear the verdict that she so assiduously facilitated. Tuno uses surveillance wiretaps and relies on evidence from Frank O'Rourke and Ben Dokic, and a new prosecution counsel highlights Perish's methodical dismemberment of Tony Falconer's body. While Decker vacillates, O'Rourke delivers enough evidence to lead to the conviction of Anthony and Andrew Perish for conspiracy to murder and murder, and Matt Lawton for murder. At trial's end, Tuno celebrates its triumph, commemorating Camille's contribution to the final outcome in her memory. A footnote remarks that the Perish brothers are currently appealing the recent verdict of murder and conspiracy to murder.

=== Notes ===
- ^{a} An episode of Person of Interest was replaced with episode seven of Underbelly: Badness in the southern states on 17 September due to the Brownlow Medal award coverage that took place on 24 September in Melbourne. The episode aired in the northern states at the same time as the Brownlow Medal award coverage aired in the southern states.

== Reception ==
Giles Hardie writing for The Sydney Morning Herald gave the first episode an A grade for "awesome glaring goodness". He explained "Underbelly: Dexter delivers. The franchise is back and despite the worst title to date, this looks like a substantial and welcome revamp of the franchise, based around a legitimately captivating criminal." He stated that the episode was worth watching again, adding that it was an "access point for those who prefer shows about the good guys not just the psychopaths."
