= Richard Bligh =

Richard Bligh (1780-1838) was a chancery barrister. The son of John Bligh and a cousin of Admiral William Bligh, he was educated at Westminster School and Trinity College, Cambridge. He graduated B.A. in 1803 and M.A. in 1806. He was called to the bar by the Society of the Inner Temple on 1 May 1807 and was admitted to the Society of Lincoln's Inn on 17 November 1826. He became an equity draftsman at the chancery bar. He was a hard worker, and had a fair amount of practice in his profession; but a considerable amount of his time was taken up by reporting in the House of Lords, in which business he was engaged for several years.

== Works ==
His works, in the order of their publication, are:

- A Report of the Case of Bills of Exchange made payable at Bankers, as decided in the House of Lords. London. 1821.
- Reports of Cases heard in the House of Lords on Appeals and Writs of Error. 10 vols. 1823.
- A Digest of the Bankrupt Law. 1832.
- Bellum Agrarium; a Foreview of the Winter of 1835, suggested by the Poor Law Project, with observations on the Report and the Bill. 1834.
- Reports of Cases in Bankruptcy. 1835. Bligh was aided in this work by Basil Montagu.
