= The Time of Our Lives season 1 =

The Time of Our Lives
- Season 1
- Season 1 DVD
- No. of episodes: 13

Release
- Original network: ABC
- Original release: 16 June – 8 September 2013

The first season of the Australian drama television series The Time of Our Lives, began airing on 16 June 2013 on ABC. The season concluded on 8 September 2013. The season consisted of 13 episodes and aired on Sundays at 8:30pm.

== Production ==
On 2 July 2012, the ABC announced a new drama project from JAHM Productions named The Time of Our Lives, a thirteen-part drama series by Amanda Higgs and Judi McCrossin – the co-creator and the principal writer of The Secret Life of Us. Filming for season one began on 29 June 2012 and wrapped in September 2012

== Cast ==
=== Main ===
- Justine Clarke as Bernadette Tivolli
- Shane Jacobson as Luce Tivolli
- William McInnes as Matt Tivolli
- Stephen Curry as Herb Ireland
- Michelle Vergara Moore as Chai Li Tivolli
- Claudia Karvan as Caroline Tivolli

=== Recurring ===
- Tony Barry as Ray Tivolli
- Sue Jones as Rosa Tivolli
- Anita Hegh as Maryanne
- Cheree Cassidy as Alice

=== Guest ===
- Alex Papps as Tom Reid
- Tina Bursill as Lenore
- Damian Walshe-Howling as Ewan
- Thomas Fisher as Carmody Tivolli
- Elise MacDougall as Georgie Flynn
- Frances McGahey as Frances Tivolli
- Tully McGahey as Tully Tivolli

== Episodes ==
| No. overall | No. in season | Title | Directed by | Written by | Original release date | Australian viewers |
|---|---|---|---|---|---|---|
| 1 | 1 | "The First New Chapter" | Chris Noonan | Judi McCrossin | 16 June 2013 | 0.935 |
| 2 | 2 | "Flight as a Feather" | Jonathan Brough | Judi McCrossin | 23 June 2013 | 0.947 |
| 3 | 3 | "No More Drama" | Jonathan Brough | Judi McCrossin | 30 June 2013 | 0.845 |
| 4 | 4 | "A Time For Us" | Tori Garrett | Michael Miller | 7 July 2013 | 0.838 |
| 5 | 5 | "Pick a Little, Talk a Little" | Tori Garrett | Judi McCrossin | 14 July 2013 | 0.819 |
| 6 | 6 | "The Final Countdown" | Ana Kokkonos | Blake Ayshford | 21 July 2013 | 0.862 |
| 7 | 7 | "With You" | Ana Kokkonos | Kris Mrksa | 28 July 2013 | 0.885 |
| 8 | 8 | "One Heart" | Kate Dennis | Judi McCrossin | 4 August 2013 | 0.870 |
| 9 | 9 | "Beneath Your Beautiful" | Kate Dennis | Ursula Cleary | 11 August 2013 | 0.865 |
| 10 | 10 | "Pure and Simple" | Steve Jodrell | Michael Miller | 18 August 2013 | 0.889 |
| 11 | 11 | "Sparkle" | Steve Jodrell | Judi McCrossin | 25 August 2013 | 0.822 |
| 12 | 12 | "More Than Words" | Ana Kokkinos | Judi McCrossin | 1 September 2013 | 0.804 |
| 13 | 13 | "Dance, While The Music Still Goes On" | Ana Kokkinos | Judi McCrossin | 8 September 2013 | 0.781 |
