= Jared Daperis =

Australian Film Director

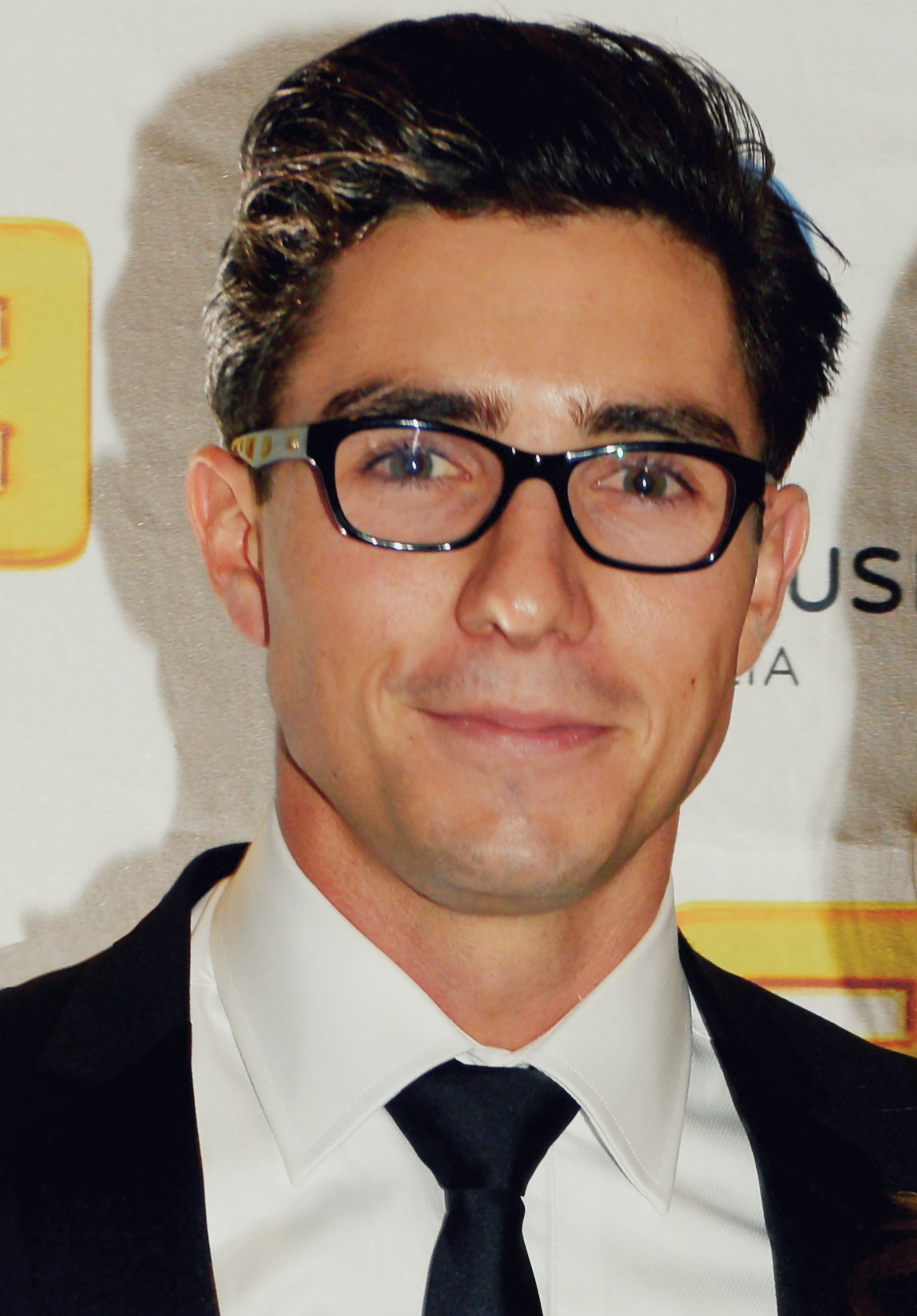
- Daperis on the red carpet in 2018
- Born: 18 August 1990 (age 35); Melbourne, Victoria, Australia
- Occupations: Film director, actor
- Years active: 1993–present
- Relatives: Daniel Daperis (brother)
- Website: http://www.jareddaperis.com

Jared Daperis (born 18 August 1990) is an Australian film director and former actor. He has received a Young Artist Award nomination and Berlin Commercial Award Nominations. His early work as an actor was compared to Heath Ledger and a "young Mel Gibson".

== Early life ==
Daperis was born in Melbourne in 1991, the middle child of three. His father of Greek descent migrated from Egypt and his mother from the United Kingdom. Daniel Daperis is his brother.

Daperis attended Mentone Grammar School in Melbourne for his secondary education before graduating and moving to New York to study at film at New York University; throughout his childhood he performed in films and television.

Daperis returned to his directorial studies in Australia and moved to Sydney to study cinematography at AFTRS. He began his directing career as a commercial director in 2018.

== Career ==
He began acting at an early age appearing in the AFI award-winning short film The Order (1999), directed by Aden Young, and in television series such as Lift Off, Carla Cametti PD, Ocean Star and as Little Joe Cartwright in the US series Ponderosa, the prequel to the hit TV series Bonanza. He also appeared in the Foxtel series Small Time Gangster. However, Daperis is best known for his leading role as the eponymous Squizzy Taylor, in Underbelly: Squizzy.

Feature film work includes the lead role in the Australian feature Playing For Charlie, composed by Academy Award winner Lisa Gerrard (Gladiator (2000) and Whale Rider in 2002 for which he received critical praise and the Italian jockey Frankie Dettori in The Cup (2011), based on the 2002 Melbourne Cup. He lent his voice to the sheep ensemble in the animated Paramount movie Charlotte's Web (2006).

His final acting appearance was in Network Nine's Underbelly: Squizzy series, where he played the lead, Joseph Leslie "Squizzy" Taylor, in 2012.

== Filmography ==
Daperis (right) on the set of Small Time Gangster with director Jeffrey Walker

=== Film appearances ===
| Year | Title | Role | Notes |
|---|---|---|---|
| 1999 | The Order | Jack | Film |
| 2001 | Like Mother Like Son | Kenny Kimes | Film |
| 2006 | Charlotte's Web | Sheep V/O | Film |
| 2008 | Playing For Charlie | Tony Hobbs | Film |
| 2011 | The Cup | Frankie Dettori | Film |
| 2015 | Hit | Shane | Short |

=== Television appearances ===
| Year | Title | Role | Notes |
|---|---|---|---|
| 1995 | Lift Off | Raph Ponti | TV series |
| 2001 | Ponderosa | Little Joe Cartwright | TV series |
| 2001 | Round The Twist | Barnaby Von Clapp | TV series |
| 2002 | Ocean Star | Trent Steadman | TV series |
| 2005 | Holly’s Heroes | Ralph Owen | TV series |
| 2009 | Carla Cametti PD | Johnno Carroll | TV series |
| 2011 | Small Time Gangster | Charlie | TV mini-series |
| 2013 | Underbelly: Squizzy | Squizzy Taylor | TV mini-series |

=== Theatre ===
| Year | Title | Role | Notes |
|---|---|---|---|
| 2002 | Oliver! | Artful Dodger | Musical Theatre |
| 2004 | The Full Monty | Nathan | Musical Theatre |
| 2006 | Hotel Sorrento | Troy Moynihan | Theatre |

== Awards and nominations ==
=== ARIA Music Awards ===
The ARIA Music Awards is an annual awards ceremony that recognises excellence, innovation, and achievement across all genres of Australian music. They commenced in 1987.

| Year | Nominee / work | Award | Result | Ref. |
|---|---|---|---|---|
| 2016 | Daniel and Jared Daperis for Gang of Youths "The Deepest Signs, the Frankest Shadows" | Best Video | Nominated | |
