= Matt Boesenberg =

Australian actor

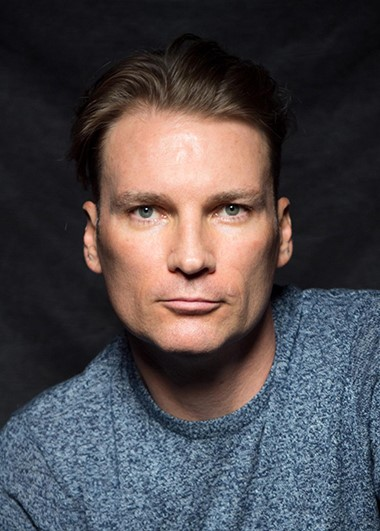
- Boesenberg in 2020
- Born: Sydney, Australia
- Occupation: Actor
- Years active: 1997–present

Matt Boesenberg is an actor born in Sydney, Australia. He has many credits in film, television and theatre. Matt is best known for Busman's Holiday (2020) and two seasons of the Underbelly television series (Underbelly: Razor and Underbelly: Squizzy). Matt is a skilled sportsman and has played representative cricket in Australia and England.

== Early career ==
Boesenberg's career began in the theatre, with his first role in the Sydney-based PACT Centre for Emerging Artists production Madagaskar Lily. He then moved on to the Australian Theatre for Young People (ATYP) where he developed a passion for Shakespeare. He played the role of Banquo in Macbeth, and Ulysses in Troilus and Cressida. He was soon awarded a scholarship by the ATYP for his outstanding work and chose to travel to New York.

On moving to New York from Australia in 1999, Boesenberg studied with the Atlantic Theater Company (a school started by David Mamet and William H. Macy). With renewed skills and vigour Boesenberg returned to the ATYP for their commissioned work with Nick Enright, called Spurboard. This play was performed in conjunction with the Sydney Theatre Company and went on to tour country New South Wales.

Keen to expand his horizons, Boesenberg travelled to Oxford, England, to study with the British American Drama Academy. There he furthered his skills with Shakespeare under the guidance of teachers such as John Barton, Jane Lapotaire and Alan Rickman.

Upon returning to Australia, Boesenberg continued working in theatre, including roles in productions such as Rebel Tour, a fictionalised account of the South African rebel tours and Prisoner of Love. He also began to focus his talents on film and television.

== Television and film ==
Boesenberg has appeared in many Australian dramas including Rush, City Homicide, The Strip, Blackjack, Stingers, All Saints and Home and Away. He is well known for his roles in Satisfaction (as Dougie), and in Carla Cametti PD where he was the hired hit man Sean Hamley.

Boesenberg has also had a number of roles in American productions. They include Knowing (with Nicolas Cage), The Pacific (with James Badge Dale) and Invincible (with Billy Zane).

Boesenberg is best known for his work in the Australian television miniseries Underbelly: Razor, in which he portrayed notorious psychopath and standover man John "Snowy" Cutmore. The series was screened on Australian television in August 2011. The premiere episode made Razor the highest rating drama in Australian history, surpassing the record set by Underbelly: A Tale of Two Cities. Boesenberg's performance was critically acclaimed as "spot on".

In the September 2011 edition of FHM Australia, Matt appeared as the joker from The Dark Knight in a fashion shoot with a difference - cast members of Underbelly: Razor were asked to channel their inner screen killer.

In 2013, Boesenberg appeared in the sixth series of Underbelly—Underbelly: Squizzy, where he starred in his reprisal of character "Snowy" Cutmore. Historically, "Snowy" Cutmore was the nemesis of Melbourne gangster Squizzy Taylor and this installment to the Underbelly franchise, set in Australia between 1915 and 1927, tells the story of Squizzy Taylor's relentless quest for power, which ultimately made him the first superstar gangster of the 20th century.

Boesenberg was cast in Busman's Holiday in 2017. Directed by Austin Smithard, the film starred Jamie McShane and was filmed in 9 countries to be released in 2020 on Amazon Prime and Apple TV in the United States.

== Filmography ==
=== Film ===
Year	Title	Role	Type
1999	All the Way	Mike Murphie	Feature film
2001	Invincible	MP #1	TV movie
2003	BlackJack	Shapiro	TV movie series
2009	Knowing	Traffic cop	Feature film
2014	The Pale Moonlight	Howard	Short film
2017	Tomorrow and Tomorrow and Tomorrow	George / Macbeth	Short film
2020	The Ghoul	Smoking man	Short film
2020	Busman's Holiday	Andrew Southsea	Feature film

=== Television ===
Year	Title	Role	Type
1998	Murder Call	Constable Ferris	TV series, 1 episode
1998	Home and Away	Tony	TV series, 1 episode
2001	All Saints	David Unwin	TV series, 1 episode
2003	Life Support		TV series, 1 episode
2004	Stingers	Nicky Stifanich	TV series, 1 episode
2007-08	Satisfaction	Dougie	TV series, 3 episodes
2008	The Strip	Bernie Bedford	TV series, 1 episode
2009	Rush	Lee Coleman	TV series, 1 episode
2009	City Homicide	Wayne Stokes	TV series, 1 episode
2009	Carla Cametti PD	Sean Hamley	TV miniseries, 3 episodes
2010	The Pacific		TV miniseries
2010	Cops LAC	Mark Mayfield	TV series, 1 episode
2011	Underbelly: Razor	John "Snowy" Cutmore	TV miniseries
2013	Underbelly: Squizzy	John "Snowy" Cutmore	TV miniseries
2014	Rake	Prosecution	TV series, 1 episode
2015	Australia: The Story of Us	Keith Murdoch	TV miniseries / docudrama, 1 episode
2017	Newton's Law	Ryan Wexler	TV miniseries, 1 episode
