= Satisfaction season 3 =

Satisfaction
- Season 3
- DVD cover
- No. of episodes: 10

Release
- Original network: Showcase
- Original release: 8 December 2009 – 9 February 2010

Season chronology
- ← Previous; Season 2

Season 3 of Satisfaction began airing on 8 December 2009, and ended on 9 February 2010. Satisfaction continued to air on Foxtel's Showcase channel, airing all 10 episodes for the 2nd season. Season 3 saw the departures of Chloe, Diana Glenn and Heather, Peta Sergeant and the new arrivals of Tess, Renai Caruso and Amy, Camille Keenan.

== Cast ==
=== Starring ===
- Kestie Morassi as Natalie
- Madeleine West as Mel
- Dustin Clare as Sean
- Alison Whyte as Lauren
- Camille Keenan as Amy
- Renai Caruso as Tess

=== Guest Starring ===
- Grant Bowler as Daniel
- John McCoy as Robert
- Shane Conner as Karl

=== Special Guest Star ===
- Madeleine West as Mel

== Episodes ==
| No. overall | No. in season | Title | Directed by | Written by | Original release date |
|---|---|---|---|---|---|
| 21 | 1 | "Amy" | Steve Jodrell | Matt Ford | 8 December 2009 |
232 is busier than ever, as two new girls spice up life in the brothel. There's Amy, a fractious university student who'll do whatever it takes to keep the customers coming back; in doing so ruffling quite a few feathers. And Tess, a former high-powered PA who has a surprising motivation for becoming a working girl. Chloe leaves the brothel while Heather escapes by going on a permanent holiday. Sean tries to impress Nat and making their relationship work by turning her on but it turns out unsuccessfully. Mel is experiencing major problems, as she is struggling to focus herself while she is on ecstasy.
| 22 | 2 | "Tess" | Steve Jodrell | Roger Simpson | 15 December 2009 |
Nat offers Tess, a good looking advertising PA, a job but Tess thinks she's joking but aside from that, she's happily ensconced where she is. Assistant and mistress to Daniel, CEO of the advertising agency, Tess isn't looking to move on; even though she has a niggling sense Daniel will never be hers exclusively. She's forced to confront her future however when Daniel's commitments to his family take priority over her needs. She finds her way back into 232 where a conversation with Lauren piques her interest in sex-work. She's picked up men in bars so she's comfortable having sex with strangers. She decides to give it a go. Amy continues to be a thorn in Lauren's side. Lauren decides to ignore her, but it just incites Amy further, making her even bolder in her attempts to grab attention.
| 23 | 3 | "Out of Tune" | Sian Davies | Samantha Winston | 22 December 2009 |
Bernie, an off-kilter fetish client of Heather's lands at 232 wanting to see her. Desperate to get rid of him, Nat makes a false promise to find him a replacement, but Bernie's not going to go away that easily. In the pursuit of normal couple dating, Sean takes Nat to the movies where she's like a fish out of water. While Sean thinks it's fun, Nat finds it excruciating. The concept of 'us' is not something that sits comfortably with her and she tells Sean she wants an open relationship.
| 24 | 4 | "Sheik Your Body" | Sian Davies | Shelley Birse | 29 December 2009 |
A memory from the past, coupled with the growing health worries, see Mel's uncertainty about her future begin to manifest in the most unusual ways. But then she is made an offer to run a brothel in Abu Dhabi. Sean has a client whose husband likes to watch her have sex. It's disturbing to Sean and when he and Nat argue about the weirdness of the situation, it further highlights their sexual differences.
| 25 | 5 | "Non Standard Package" | Ian Watson | Meaghan Rodriguez | 6 December 2010 |
Amy agrees to a date with a customer after hours and gets into a sticky situation. Daniel continues to pursue Tess, as she struggles to assert herself and set the boundaries of work and play. While Sean is busier than ever, as a pool boy tempting rich cougars, has him questioning what Nat is after.
| 26 | 6 | "Staples, Guns and Roses" | Ian Watson | Jo Martino | 12 January 2010 |
Sean's out on his own with some friends: Alice, Steve and client-come-friend, Jemima. He lets his guard down more than usual, drinking, drugging and partying into the wee hours and wakes up the next day, remembering very little — but knowing they had some pretty wild sex. Feeling angry at Sean and realising their differences are insurmountable, Nat manipulates a situation with Bernie which sees Sean bust in on their session. But it opens the way for honest discussion about the state of their relationship and the restrictions it places on both of them.
| 27 | 7 | "Playthings" | Ken Cameron | Matt Ford | 19 January 2010 |
Following a visit to the doctor, the reality that he was unknowingly penetrated hits home for Sean. Discounting Steve as the culprit confirms Jemima's claims; Alice is the perpetrator. However when Sean attempts to make her accountable, she denies responsibility. When Nat learns of the incident and follows it up with Sean, she urges him to continue to push Alice for the truth. Once again Alice fails to relent which sees Sean threatening blackmail unless she admits to the attack. Tess's regular client, Turnball, returns and she finds herself getting involved in his family problems. Tess seems to be falling into the sa
| 28 | 8 | "Not Vanilla" | Ken Cameron | Shelley Birse | 26 January 2010 |
A turn of events at work for Bernie and the subsequent therapy forced upon him by his boss sees Nat grow curious about the origins of her own fetish. This leads her to track down her mother, Loretta. It's an uneasy reunion for Nat, who finds the situation more confronting than she ever imagined it would be. Though Sean initially continues to struggle with the detritus of what happened with Alice, support from Nat and a particularly satisfying session with a client sees him charged with a determination to get over the incident once and for all. Lauren's relationship with John goes from strength to strength but the pull of her children sees her leave him behind when she heads off on a holiday to meet up with her daughter Kate in Hawaii.
| 29 | 9 | "Bug Crush" | Paul Moloney | Matt Ford | 2 February 2010 |
With Kate home for holidays and her relationship with John developing, Lauren's very content. She's oblivious however, to her daughter's insecurities about the new domestic set up and is aware of the lengths Kate is prepared to go to make trouble between her and John. Amy becomes involved with Dominic, a strange client whose doctor has advised he visits a prostitute because he lacks sexual confidence. Initially Amy thinks he's harmlessly naive, but when Dominic brings along a bug to their session, she realises there is much more to him than meets the eye.
| 30 | 10 | "Lifesavers" | Paul Moloney | Shelley Birse | 9 February 2010 |
Lauren's drinking is taking an alarming turn. A blackout sees her arrive home drunk in the back of the cab. When the police arrive on her doorstep with the news her car was found abandoned and smashed, she finds herself inadvertently withholding information which results in the police thinking her car was stolen. What Lauren comes to remember is quite different — and damaging. She got drunk, drove her car, careened it into a public place and travelled home passed out in a taxi. Mel lands back at 232 with a huge surprise. She's adopted a baby. Something which has happened swiftly and, judging from her nervousness, a role she's not all together convinced she's ready for. Sean however discovers he has a natural instinct with the baby and so, well aware of Mel's insecurities, offers to venture back to Abu Dhabi to help her settle into motherhood.

== Release ==
On 5 October 2010, Satisfaction season 3 was released on DVD, featuring, 10 episodes, and plenty of special features.

The Third Season
| Set details | Special features |
| 10 episodes; 518 minutes; 3-disc set; 1.78:1 aspect ratio; Languages: English (Dolby Digital 2.0 Surround); Subtitles: None | "Special Featurette" |
| Release dates | "Special Featurette" |
| Australia | "Special Featurette" |
| 5 October 2010 | "Special Featurette" |
