= ASTRA Award for Favourite Program =

- Country: Australia
- Presented by: ASTRA
- First award: 2004
- Final award: 2010
- Website: www.astraawards.com

The ASTRA Award for Favourite Program is an award presented at the ASTRA Awards since 2004.

== Overview ==
Award titles

- Favourite Australian Production (2004)
- Favourite Program (2005–present)

Most wins
Number of wins	Program	Years
3	Australia's Next Top Model	2006, 2007, 2008
2	Selling Houses Australia	2009, 2010
1	Food Source New Zealand	2004
1	Neil Perry Rockpool Sessions	2005

Winners by network
Network	Number of wins
Fox8	3
The LifeStyle Channel	4
Total	7

== Recipients ==
Year^{[I]}	Program	Channel	Nominees	Ref.
2004	Food Source New Zealand	The LifeStyle Channel		
2005	Neil Perry Rockpool Sessions	The LifeStyle Channel		
2006	Australia's Next Top Model	Fox8		
2007	Australia's Next Top Model	Fox8		
2008	Australia's Next Top Model	Fox8	American Chopper Australia (Discovery Channel); Dangerous (Fox8); The King (TV1); Love My Way (Showtime); Parkinson: The Shane Warne Interview (UK.TV; Satisfaction (Showcase); Stupid, Stupid Man (TV1)	
2009	Selling Houses Australia	The LifeStyle Channel		
2010	Selling Houses Australia (season 2)	The LifeStyle Channel	Australia's Next Top Model (series 5) (Fox8); B430 (Channel [V]); Camp Orange: The Final Frontier (Nickelodeon; The Contender Australia (Fox8); (United States) Deadliest Catch (season 5) (Discovery Channel); Football Superstar (series 2) (Fox8); Sound Relief (Channel [V] and Max)	
2011	TBA	TBA	TBA	

^{^[I]} Each year is linked to the article about the ASTRA Awards held that year.
