= Satisfaction season 2 =

Satisfaction
- Season 2
- DVD cover
- No. of episodes: 10

Release
- Original network: Showcase
- Original release: 2 December 2008 – 3 February 2009

Season chronology
- ← Previous; Season 1 Next → Season 3

Season 2 of Satisfaction began airing on 2 December 2008, and ended on 3 February 2009. Satisfaction continued to air on Foxtel's Showcase channel, airing all 10 episodes for the 2nd season. Season 2 saw the arrival of new character Sean (Dustin Clare), and also the departure of Tippi (Bojana Novakovic).

== Cast ==
=== Starring ===
- Diana Glenn as Chloe
- Kestie Morassi as Natalie
- Bojana Novakovic as Tippi (Episode 1–4)
- Peta Sergeant as Heather
- Madeleine West as Mel
- Dustin Clare as Sean (Episode 3–)
- Alison Whyte as Lauren

=== Guest Starring ===
- Jacki Weaver as Gillian
- Liam Hemsworth as Marc
- Jez Constable as William

=== Special Guest ===
- Benard Curry as Married Man

== Episodes ==
No. overall	No. in season	Title	Directed by	Written by	Original release date
11	1	"Last Look"	Paul Moloney	Matt Ford	2 December 2008
Back to work, and with the introduction of a new escort, 232 continues to service its clients like never before — yet behind the thin professional veil, relationships are tested and the boundaries of love crossed. Satisfaction 2 exposes the secret world of sex workers whilst uncovering the relationships they forge — as worker, mother, sister, brother, friend and lover.
12	2	"Pony Girl"	Paul Moloney	Samantha Winston	9 December 2008
A new client forces Heather to realise that beneath her liberal facade she does have certain boundaries. Spurred on by a car salesman client and looking for some adventure, Lauren buys herself a new car and becomes a lead foot. Tippi takes on Martin, a client who made Chloe distinctly uncomfortable, and whilst working at 232 fixing the sound-system, Josh is confronted by the reality of Chloe's work. Sensing he's troubled, Tippi's on hand to distract him.
13	3	"What Do You Love"	Steve Jodrell	Samantha Winston	16 December 2008
Mel receives an untimely visit from her brother Sean, whose arrival in her life usually signals trouble. Tippi invites Sean to look around 232 and meeting Nat makes his head spin and he begins to consider a career change. Tippi has a frightening session with Martin whilst Lauren has a surprising encounter with her ex-husband's best friend Max. Trying to remain buoyant, Chloe prepares Bonnie for boarding school.
14	4	"Playground"	Steve Jodrell	Jo Martino	23 December 2008
Haunted by her encounter with Martin, Tippi becomes involved with a sexually dysfunctional client, Zoron, who invites her away for the weekend. Tippi sees it as an opportunity for them both to forget their troubles; but the outcome couldn't be further from the truth. Chloe is relieved when Josh stops working at 232, while Lauren's ex-husband Phil threatens to tell their kids about her sex-work. Sean confesses to Mel he is now a sex-worker, leaving her furious with Nat.
15	5	"A Good Eye For Shoes"	Catriona McKenzie	Matt Ford	30 December 2008
Lauren is approached by Fiona, the wife of upcoming politician Terence O'Neil, to seduce her husband. Gleaning Fiona's motivation is to control her husband, Lauren's curiosity gets the better of her and she accepts the job. Mel receives a visit from Tippi's mum, who forces her to question her role in Tippi's life. Josh leaves on tour with his band, and Chloe has a very enjoyable session with Bill who surprisingly doesn't want sex.
16	6	"Gene Therapy"	Catriona McKenzie	Shelley Birse	6 January 2009
While Mel's life seems to be unravelling, the arrival of her mother, Gillian, only adds to her distress. When Gillian discovers Sean is now on the game, she offers him money to start a new career — something she never did for Mel. Lauren's job with Terence is becoming increasingly complicated, while Heather meets a married couple — Jack and Eloise — who want a threesome. It's the first time Heather's ever been paid to have sex with a woman.
17	7	"All Those Monkeys"	Daniel Nettheim	Matt Ford	13 January 2009
Terence suspects Lauren is a sex-worker, but just as Lauren realises she now has feelings for Terence, he suffers a heart-attack and Lauren's left in an almighty mess. A sex worker, in a hotel room with a dying politician — what on earth is she supposed to do? Meanwhile, with Mum gone, Mel and Sean kick back and enjoy the peace. But Gillian is closer than they think — she's hanging around 232 and Heather's troubled when she has a spectacular orgasm with Jack — the first time it has happened with a man.
18	8	"Cyclone Chloe"	Daniel Nettheim	Shelley Birse	20 January 2009
Trying to avoid connection to Terence and ordered by Fiona to stay away from 232, Lauren is lying low but realises her greatest fear is her children finding out she is a sex-worker. She decides it is time to tell them what she does and books a trip to LA. Rattled by her strong sexual connection to Jack, Heather sets out to confirm that her lesbian tendencies are still firmly in place. Chloe questions her relationship with Josh as he returns from the tour.
19	9	"Apples"	Paul Moloney	Samantha Winston	27 January 2009
Mel has a new client, Marc, who is very young and very eager. Confident, fun, and with access to plenty of money he makes her feel invigorated and is precisely the frivolous diversion Mel needs in her life at the moment. Nat becomes aware she has feelings for Sean and Heather's having trouble disengaging from Jack, overwhelmed by the heterosexual feelings he continues to unleash in her.
20	10	"Split Kisses"	Paul Moloney	Samantha Winston	3 February 2009
With Sean's intentions now out in the open, fantasy and reality are blurring for Nat. Provoked by a particularly intimate gesture from Sean, Nat realises she needs to make a step towards a real human connection. Marc refuses to accept that, given particular circumstances, things are over with Mel, while Chloe is missing Bonnie more than ever and discovers her daughter is feeling the same. Meanwhile, after returning home into the eye of a media storm, Lauren is introduced into high society by Mel - and she is treated like a star.

== Release ==
On 1 October 2009, Satisfaction season 2 was released on DVD, featuring, 10 episodes, and plenty of special features.

The First Season
Set details	Special features
10 episodes; 518 minutes; 3-disc set; 1.78:1 aspect ratio; Languages: English (Dolby Digital 2.0 Surround); Subtitles: None	"Back to Work"; "The Girls"; "Sean"; The Writing"; Tippi"; The Style"; Costume"; Scrip to Screen"; The Sex Factor"
Release dates	"Back to Work"; "The Girls"; "Sean"; The Writing"; Tippi"; The Style"; Costume"; Scrip to Screen"; The Sex Factor"
Australia	"Back to Work"; "The Girls"; "Sean"; The Writing"; Tippi"; The Style"; Costume"; Scrip to Screen"; The Sex Factor"
1 October 2009	"Back to Work"; "The Girls"; "Sean"; The Writing"; Tippi"; The Style"; Costume"; Scrip to Screen"; The Sex Factor"
