= ASTRA Award for Favourite Personality =

- Country: Australia
- Presented by: ASTRA
- First award: 2004
- Final award: 2010
- Website: www.astraawards.com

The ASTRA Award for Favourite Personality is an award presented at the ASTRA Awards since 2004. Originally presented in gender-specific categories, it was merged into one award in 2010.

== Overview ==
Award titles (gender categories; 2004-2009)

- Favourite Subscription Television Presenter – Male (2004)
- Favourite Subscription Television Presenter – Female (2004)
- Favourite Male Presenter (2005)
- Favourite Female Presenter (2005)
- Favourite Male Personality (2006-2009)
- Favourite Female Personality (2006-2009)

Award titles (merged)

- Favourite Personality (2010–present)

Most wins
| Number of wins | Program | Years |
Males
| 2 | Brendan Moar | 2004, 2005 |
| 1 | James Mathison | 2006 |
| 1 | Steve Irwin | 2007 |
| 1 | Jimmy Barnes | 2008 |
| 1 | Merrick and Rosso | 2009 |
Females
| 2 | Antonia Kidman | 2007, 2008 |
| 1 | Magda Szubanksi | 2004 |
| 1 | Shannon Fricke | 2005 |
| 1 | Erika Heynatz | 2006 |
| 1 | Ruby Rose | 2009 |
Merged
| 1 | Andrew Winter | 2010 |

Winners by network
| Network | Number of wins | | | |
| Network | Male | Female | Merged | Total |
| Animal Planet | 1 | 0 | 0 | 1 |
| Channel [V] | 1 | 0 | 0 | 1 |
| The Comedy Channel | 1 | 0 | 0 | 1 |
| Fox8 | 0 | 1 | 0 | 1 |
| The LifeStyle Channel | 2 | 1 | 1 | 4 |
| Max | 1 | 0 | 0 | 1 |
| MTV Australia | 0 | 1 | 0 | 1 |
| TV1 | 0 | 1 | 0 | 1 |
| W | 0 | 2 | 0 | 2 |
| Totals | 6 | 6 | 1 | 13 |

== Recipients ==
=== Males ===
| Year^{[I]} | Presenter/Personality | Channel | Nominees | Ref. |
|---|---|---|---|---|
| 2004 | Brendan Moar | The LifeStyle Channel | | |
| 2005 | Brendan Moar | The LifeStyle Channel | | |
| 2006 | James Mathison | Channel [V] | | |
| 2007 | Steve Irwin | Animal Planet | | |
| 2008 | Jimmy Barnes | Max | James Kerley (Channel [V]); Cameron Knight (The Comedy Channel); Stuart MacGill (LifeStyle Food); Darren McMullen (MTV); Ben O'Donoghue (The LifeStyle Channel); David Speers (Sky News) | |
| 2009 | Merrick and Rosso | The Comedy Channel | | |

=== Females ===
| Year^{[I]} | Presenter/Personality | Channel | Nominees | Ref. |
|---|---|---|---|---|
| 2004 | Magda Szubanksi | TV1 | | |
| 2005 | Shannon Fricke | The LifeStyle Channel | | |
| 2006 | Erika Heynatz | Fox8 | | |
| 2007 | Antonia Kidman | W. | | |
| 2008 | Antonia Kidman | W. | Maz Compton (MTV); Helen Dalley (Sky News); Charlotte Dawson (FOX8); Brooke Forster (Sky News); Anna Gare (The LifeStyle Channel); Yumi Stynes (Max); Maggie Tabberer (Bio.) | |
| 2009 | Ruby Rose | MTV Australia | | |

=== Merged ===
| Year^{[I]} | Program | Channel | Nominees | Ref. |
|---|---|---|---|---|
| 2010 | Andrew Winter | The LifeStyle Channel | Jimmy Barnes (Max); Danny Clayton (Channel [V]); Bill Collins (Fox Classics); Brendan Moar (The LifeStyle Channel); Sarah Murdoch (Fox8); Alex Perry (Fox8); Ruby Rose (MTV Australia) | |
| 2011 | TBA | TBA | TBA | |

^{^[I]} Each year is linked to the article about the ASTRA Awards held that year.
