= Satisfaction season 1 =

Satisfaction
- Season 1
- DVD cover
- No. of episodes: 10

Release
- Original network: Showcase
- Original release: 5 December 2007 – 30 January 2008

Season chronology
- Next → Season 2

The first season of Satisfaction began airing on 5 December 2007, on Foxtel's Showcase and finished on 30 January 2008. Airing 10 episodes, the show explored the lives of 6 women who are sex workers in a high class brothel. Cast includes Alison Whyte, Madeleine West, Peta Sergeant, Kestie Morassi, Bojana Novakovic, and Diana Glenn. Using the slogan "Six Women. Two Lives. One Profession" to promote the show.

== Cast ==
=== Starring ===
- Diana Glenn as Chloe
- Kestie Morassi as Natalie
- Bojana Novakovic as Tippi
- Peta Sergeant as Heather
- Madeleine West as Mel
- Alison Whyte as Lauren

=== Guest Starring ===
- Robert Mammone as Nick
- Sullivan Stapleton as Josh
- Nicholas Bell as Alex

=== Special Guest ===
- James Sorensen as Private School Boy

== Episodes ==
No. overall	No. in season	Title	Directed by	Written by	Original release date
1	1	"Running Girl"	Ken Cameron	Roger Simpson	5 December 2007
Chloe's world begins to unravel when a long standing regular, Warwick, fails to turn up for his monthly visit. Surprisingly, it's this meek man and his 'disappearance' which exposes Chloe's insecurity and shakes her relationship with her long-term but frequently absent boyfriend Josh. Questions about family from her 14-year-old daughter Bonnie propel Chloe back to where it all began, in a dusty town with a passing truck driver.
2	2	"Mrs. Hyde"	Ken Cameron	Fiona Seres	5 December 2007
High class escort Mel finds herself challenged by Johnny Lake, a rock star client with a huge ego and some damaging sexual problems. A drug fuelled night of psychological game-playing ends in Johnny verging on death and Mel seeking out her elusive lover Tim Kronenberg. When Tim suggests she come away with him, Mel is tempted by the security of someone she knows and loves. But just as she's considering her options, Mel discovers a destructive side to Tim he seems unwilling to change.
3	3	"Jizz"	Paul Moloney	Matt Ford	12 December 2007
Heather and her partner Ally want to have a baby, using Ally's good friend Gary. But when Gary's new partner Eadie's troublesome attitude comes to light and legal contracts get waved around, Heather and Ally angrily end the arrangement. Heather devises an unusual solution which sends Ally into a tailspin.
4	4	"Lauren Rising"	Paul Moloney	Katherine Thomson	19 December 2007
The harsh reality of 232 hits newly initiated Lauren in the face, and sees her scurry back to the familiarity of suburbia. But when Chloe pursues her, Lauren realises sex work will help her confront the breakdown of her marriage to Phil and some uncomfortable sexual issues. Returning to 232, Lauren regains her confidence, gets herself a thankful regular and develops the steel to order Phil out of her life.
5	5	"Truth"	Daina Reid	Deb Cox	26 December 2007
Tippi is perplexed by a client, Aiden, who seems to be suppressing his sexual urges. Chloe comes clean with Bonnie about her work and Bonnie promptly shuts down. Thinking it will help, Chloe decides to cool things with Josh, but Bonnie is doubly annoyed. Lauren discovers Heather is pregnant and lends her support. Finally, Tippi learns the shattering truth about her mystery client.
6	6	"Family"	Daina Reid	Roger Simpson	2 January 2008
Tippi negotiates her relationship with Aiden, but realises there's no room for him in her life. Surprisingly, Bonnie gives Chloe the okay to go back to work. Pregnant Heather is offered some on-going support from Alex while one of Lauren's clients brushes up on his seduction skills, which she misinterprets as intended for her.
7	7	"Rubber Dubber"	Ken Cameron	Katherine Thomson	9 January 2008
A constant stream of regulars greets Chloe on her return to work, as well as an old friend who reminds Chloe of her achievements. But at home she's rocked to discover Bonnie's dangerous internet activities. Lauren is shaken when her children announce they're moving to America with their father, while Heather's under pressure to sell the home she shared with Ally.
8	8	"Zipless"	Ken Cameron	Fiona Seres, Samantha Winston	16 January 2008
Tippi embarks on an unusual adventure with a long term client, which becomes life-threatening. Meanwhile Mel finds a significant amount of money mysteriously deposited in her bank account and is further perplexed when she's faced with Nick's shady past. Heather moves in with Lauren, while Chloe's confusion continues over her relationship with Josh and Bonnie's attitude to her work. Troubled by Nick's overnight disappearance, Nat worries about her father's activities.
9	9	"Paying For It"	Paul Moloney	Matt Ford	23 January 2008
Chloe, Bonnie and Josh begin counselling sessions. Josh proposes marriage, which fails to appease Chloe's troubled mind, but it's an unusual client who provides an unexpected insight for Chloe. Nat and Nick are faced with a huge tax bill, which puts a strain on their relationship, while Mel's lover Tim reappears and makes a claim on her. Lauren's former husband Phil tells her he needs to sell the family home and Heather's decision about the baby appears to be cemented.
10	10	"Slaying The Goat"	Paul Moloney	Matt Ford	23 January 2008
News that 232 is on the market inspires Lauren to lobby the girls to form a syndicate. Mel's disappointment in Tim propels her to contemplate ownership of the brothel and a committed relationship with Nick. Heather's decision about the baby is taken out of her hands, while a client and his wife help Tippi rediscover the fun in her work. As Nick prepares to set up house with Mel, an unexpected visitor from his past changes the course of Nick's life.

== Release ==
On 18 October 2008, Satisfaction season 1 was released on DVD, featuring, 10 episodes, and plenty of special features.

The First Season
Set details	Special features
10 episodes; 488 minutes; 3-disc set; 1.78:1 aspect ratio; Languages: English (Dolby Digital 2.0 Surround); Subtitles: None	"Behind the Sex"; "Casting of Satisfaction"; "Character Profiles"; Set Design (232)"; Costume Design"
Release dates	"Behind the Sex"; "Casting of Satisfaction"; "Character Profiles"; Set Design (232)"; Costume Design"
Australia	"Behind the Sex"; "Casting of Satisfaction"; "Character Profiles"; Set Design (232)"; Costume Design"
18 October 2008	"Behind the Sex"; "Casting of Satisfaction"; "Character Profiles"; Set Design (232)"; Costume Design"
