= Lone Wolf (2021 film) =

- Directed by: Jonathan Ogilvie
- Written by: Jonathan Ogilvie
- Produced by: Mat Govoni; Adam White
- Starring: Tilda Cobham-Hervey; Josh McConville; Lawrence Mooney; Hugo Weaving
- Cinematography: Geoffrey Simpson
- Edited by: Bernadette Murray
- Music by: Jim Cruse; Moogy Morgan; Chris Abrahams; Melanie Oxley
- Production company: Future Pictures
- Distributed by: Gravitas Ventures
- Release date: 24 September 2021
- Running time: 103 minutes
- Country: Australia
- Language: English

Lone Wolf is a 2021 Australian science fiction political thriller film written and directed by Jonathan Ogilvie. It stars Tilda Cobham-Hervey, Hugo Weaving, Lawrence Mooney, Josh McConville, and Diana Glenn.

== Plot ==
The story is based on Joseph Conrad's 1907 novel The Secret Agent, but set in the near future in Australia instead of London in the early 1900s. Winnie, who runs an adult book and video store with her boyfriend Conrad, shares a home with her learning disabled brother Stevie. Conrad is drawn into a plot by a banned organisation to disrupt the forthcoming G20 summit, little suspecting that he could be a target.

== Cast ==
- Hugo Weaving as Minister
- Tilda Cobham-Hervey as Winnie
- Chris Bunton as Stevie
- Diana Glenn as Kylie
- Josh McConville as Conrad
- Marlon Williams as Alex Ossipon
- Stephen Curry as Assistant Commissioner
- Lawrence Mooney as Father Michaelis
- Tyler Coppin as Hippy Karl
- Eddie Baroo as Rolli from Magic Carpets

== Production ==
Jonathan Ogilvie wrote and directed the film.

== Release ==
The film was released by Gravitas Ventures in theaters and on VOD on 24 September 2021.

== Reception ==
As of February 2024 film has a 63% rating on Rotten Tomatoes, based on eight reviews.

Wendy Ide of Screen International gave the film a positive review, calling it "a deliberately unpolished political thriller and a novel spin on the found footage approach".

Kat Halstead of Common Sense Media awarded the film two stars out of five.

== Awards and nominations ==
Lone Wolf was nominated for the Best Indie Film in the 11th AACTA Awards.

== See also ==
- Cinema of Australia
