= Teague Rook =

Australian actor

Teague Rook (born 27 June 1971) is an Australian actor who is best known for his role as Steve Everson in the Australian children's television drama series Silversun. He made a minor appearance in the 2006 film Charlotte's Web, and has appeared in various other Australian television shows and films such as Razor Eaters, Crackerjack, Satisfaction, Blue Heelers, Scooter: Secret Agent, All Saints, Stingers, Neighbours & the 2015 miniseries Gallipoli.

== Early life ==
Rook was born in Melbourne, Victoria. In 1996, he studied at the Victorian College of the Arts, graduating in 1998 with a BA in Acting.

== Other ventures ==
=== Teaching ===
In 2014, Rook studied a one-year Education course at Monash University graduating with a graduate diploma. Since then, he teaches media studies at Pakenham Springs Primary School.

=== Charity work ===
Since 2018, Rook has been a board member for the Magical Getaway Foundation, a charity which aims to gift the experience of going on a holiday/getaway to underprivileged Australian children and their families.

== Personal life ==
Rook has three children. His eldest son, Harrison, is a film director, who mainly directs short films and music videos. His first feature-length film, Moros, entered post-production in 2024, with his father set to play the role of Dr. Martin Nash.
