= 2008 ASTRA Awards =

The 6th Annual ASTRA Awards were presented on Monday, 21 April 2008 at the Hordern Pavilion in Sydney.

== Nominations and winners ==
=== Hall of Fame ===
Channel of the Year
Winner:

FOX8

Nominated:

The History Channel
Sky News
Nickelodeon
Fox Sports

=== Talent ===
Most Outstanding Performance by an Actor – Male
Winner:

Stephen Curry – The King (TV1)

Nominated:

Brendan Cowell – Love My Way (Showtime)
Wayne Hope – Stupid, Stupid Man (TV1)
Ben Mendelsohn – Love My Way (Showtime)
Dan Wyllie – Love My Way (Showtime)

Most Outstanding Performance by an Actor – Female
Winner:

Claudia Karvan – Love My Way (Showtime)

Nominated:

Diana Glenn – Satisfaction (Showcase)
Asher Keddie – Love My Way (Showtime)
Bojana Novakovic – Satisfaction (Showcase)
Alison Whyte – Satisfaction (Showcase)

Most Outstanding Performance by a Presenter
Winner:

David Speers – Agenda (Sky News)

Nominated:

Jimmy Barnes – The Know (Max)
Helen Dalley – Sunday Business (Sky News)
James Kerley – Cash Cab (Channel [V])
Steve Liebmann – Crime Investigation Australia (Crime & Investigation Network)
Stuart MacGill – Stuart MacGill Uncorked (LifeStyle Food)

Most Outstanding Performance by a Broadcast Journalist
Winner:

Kieran Gilbert (Sky News)

Nominated:

Rebecca Perrie (Fox Sports News)
Michael Willesee (Sky News)
Gavin Morris (The Weather Channel)

=== Subscribers’ Choice ===
Favourite Program
Winner:

Australia's Next Top Model (FOX8)

Nominated:

American Chopper Australia (Discovery Channel)
Dangerous (FOX8)
The King (TV1)
Love My Way (Showtime)
Parkinson: The Shane Warne Interview (UKTV)
Satisfaction (Showcase)
Stupid, Stupid Man (TV1)

Favourite International Program
Winner:

High School Musical 2 (Disney Channel)

Nominated:

The Daily Show with Jon Stewart (The Comedy Channel)
Deadliest Catch (Discovery Channel Australia)
Dexter (Showcase)
Grand Designs (The LifeStyle Channel)
Gossip Girl (FOX8)
MythBusters Supersized Special (Discovery Channel Australia)
The Riches (Showcase)

Favourite International Personality or Actor
Winner:

Gordon Ramsay – Hell's Kitchen (LifeStyle Food)

Nominated:

Minnie Driver – The Riches (Showcase)
Zac Efron – High School Musical 2 (Disney Channel)
Michael C. Hall – Dexter (Showcase)
Eddie Izzard – The Riches (Showcase)
MythBusters Team – MythBusters (Discovery Channel Australia)
Michael Parkinson – Parkinson: The Shane Warne Interview (UKTV)
Trinny and Susannah – Trinny & Susannah Undress... (The LifeStyle Channel)

Favourite Male Personality
Winner:

Jimmy Barnes (Max)

Nominated:

James Bracey (Sky News)
James Kerley (Channel [V])
Cameron Knight (The Comedy Channel)
Stuart MacGill (LifeStyle Food)
Darren McMullen (MTV)
Ben O'Donoghue (The LifeStyle Channel)
David Speers (Sky News)

Favourite Female Personality
Winner:

Antonia Kidman (W.)

Nominated:

Maz Compton (MTV)
Helen Dalley (Sky News)
Charlotte Dawson (FOX8)
Brooke Forster (Sky News)
Anna Gare (The LifeStyle Channel)
Yumi Stynes (Max)
Maggie Tabberer (Bio.)

=== Programming & Production ===
Most Outstanding International Program or Event
Winner:

The Riches (Showcase)

Nominated:

Dexter (Showcase)
Discovery Atlas: India Revealed (Discovery Channel)
Mad Men (Movie Extra)

Most Outstanding Event
Winner:

Nickelodeon Australian Kids' Choice Awards 2007 (Nickelodeon)

Nominated:

Australia’s Next Top Model final (FOX8)
2007 Helpmann Awards (Bio.)
MTV Australia Video Music Awards 2007 (MTV)
Sport Australia Hall of Fame (Fox Sports 3)

Most Outstanding Short Form Program
Winner:

Snoop (MTV)

Nominated:

Action Earth (FOX8 and The Weather Channel)
The Anzac Day interstitial (The History Channel)
Tipping Point (The Weather Channel)

Most Outstanding Children's Program
Winner:

Camp Orange: The Mystery of Spaghetti Creek (Nickelodeon)

Nominated:

As the Bell Rings: Treasure Map (Disney Channel)

Most Outstanding Music Program or Coverage
Winner:

MAX Sessions: Powderfinger, Concert for the Cure (Max)

Nominated:

The Lair (MTV)
MAX Sessions: Jimmy Barnes (Max)
Rollin' with the Muster (Country Music Channel)
Snowjam (MTV)

Most Outstanding Sports Program
Winner:

On the Couch (Fox Sports 1)

Nominated:

MTV Sports (MTV)
NRL on FOX (Fox Sports 3)
Total Football (Fox Sports 3)

Most Outstanding Sports Coverage
Winner:

Wallabies (Fox Sports 2)

Most Outstanding Documentary
Winner:

Thanks for Listening (The History Channel)

Most Outstanding News Program or Coverage
Winner:

APEC 2007 (Sky News)

Most Outstanding LifeStyle Program
Winner:

Stuart MacGill Uncorked (LifeStyle Food)

Most Outstanding Light Entertainment Program
Winner:

The Singing Office (FOX8)

Most Outstanding Drama
Winner:

The King (TV1)
