= Eddie Baroo =

Australian actor (born 1968)

- Born: 25 September 1968 (age 57); Geelong, Victoria, Australia
- Occupations: Actor, screenwriter
- Years active: 2001–present
- Spouse: Jacqui Williams 2014-current
- Children: 5

Eddie Baroo (born 25 September 1968) is an Australian actor, screenwriter, singer and guitarist.

== Early life ==
After working in the fields of construction and accounting, Baroo decided to pursue a career in acting at the age of 30. He first began work as an extra, until the director of ABC's Something in the Air, encouraged him to audition for a role in the series, with the support of cast members Eric Bana and Jeremy Lindsay Taylor.

== Career ==
Baroo's first acting credits included guest roles in Something in the Air and an appearance in 2001 PAX TV western drama series Ponderosa. Further early guest appearances followed, with roles in Blue Heelers and Stingers. He then had a minor role in 2006 film The Book of Revelation before playing a motorcycle gang member opposite Nicolas Cage and Eva Mendes in Ghost Rider.

Baroo then won the role of Bull in Baz Luhrmann's 2008 epic adventure romance film Australia, opposite Nicole Kidman and Hugh Jackman. He followed this with 2009 comedy drama film My Year Without Sex, in which he played Tim Donnelly, alongside Matt Day and Sacha Horler. In 2010, he played Willy in Australian neo-western thriller Red Hill, with Ryan Kwanten and Steve Bisley, and Uncle Ed in Summer Coda, with Rachael Taylor and Alex Dimitriades.

Baroo next took on the part of Fourpack in 2012 sci-fi horror film Crawlspace, for which he also served as one of the writers. The same year, he played the role of Shadow in comedy sports film Save Your Legs!, with Stephen Curry, Brendan Cowell and Brenton Thwaites. He also appeared with Shane Jacobson and Lachy Hulme in TV movie Beaconsfield, a retelling of the true story of Brant Webb and Todd Russell, who were trapped nearly a kilometre below ground in a mining accident.

In 2014, Baroo played the part of Gary in drama film Fell, with Matt Nable, Jacqueline McKenzie and Daniel Henshall, and also held the role of Merv in crime drama Son of a Gun, opposite Ewan McGregor and Brenton Thwaites. That same year, he also landed a role in Underbelly crime series spin-off, Fat Tony & Co., playing the role of Scrooge. In 2015, he then appeared in comedy film Sucker, with Timothy Spall and Shaun Micallef. and played Gary in drama film Downriver, alongside Kerry Fox and Robert Taylor.

Baroo took on the part of Hammerhead Carney in 2016 comedy drama film Spin Out, appearing with Xavier Samuel. He also landed a role in Wolf Creek, the spin-off series of the 2005 horror film of the same name, in which John Jarratt reprised his role as Mick Taylor. He then played opposite Ryan Corr as Webby in Matt Nable-penned 2017 crime film Outlaws and acted opposite Luke Ford in What If It Works?. In 2018, he appeared in supernatural horror film The Marshes, before playing the recurring role of Tyson Zein in the first season of Mystery Road. He also had a recurring role in the 2019 second season of comedy drama series Mr Inbetween, and acted in a supporting role in miniseries Lambs of God.

In 2020, Baroo appeared in mystery drama film The Dry, in the role of affable publican McMurdo. Director Robert Connolly specifically sought him out for the role, in which his character was the ally of the main character Detective Aaron Falk, played by Baroo's former Something in the Air cast mate Eric Bana. That year, he also acted in docudrama film The Flood, before playing the role of Tom Evans in horror drama film Sweet River, for which he was also a writer. The following year, he had a part in sci-fi drama film Lone Wolf, with Hugo Weaving, Diana Glenn and Stephen Curry.

Baroo reunited again with Eric Bana in 2022 family film Blueback, which also starred Mia Wasikowska and Radha Mitchell. The same year, he featured in a recurring capacity in 2022 drama miniseries Irreverent, playing the role of Andy.

Baroo reprised the role of Bull, alongside Nicole Kidman and Hugh Jackman, in Faraway Downs, Baz Luhrmann's 2023 six-part adaptation of his 2008 film Australia. The series was devised when, during COVID, Luhrmann revisited the hundreds of hours of unused footage from the film.

More recently, Baroo had a recurring role as Big Pete in 2024 comedy miniseries Thou Shalt Not Steal, starring alongside Noah Taylor and Miranda Otto. The same year, he also had two small parts in Western drama miniseries Territory, appearing opposite Michael Dorman and Anna Torv. In 2025, he played the recurring role of Bomber in four-part comedy crime drama Reckless.

In 2026, Baroo will appear in the films How to Talk Australians and The Mongoose, featuring alongside Liam Neeson and Marisa Tomei in the latter.

Baroo is the lead singer and frontman of the band Stodgewood.

== Personal life ==
Baroo is married to wife Jacqui and lives in Lara, a suburb of Geelong in Victoria, where he is a Freemason of Geelong Lodge of Unity and Prudence No. 5. He has five children, and bears tattoos of their childhood artwork on his body.

== Filmography ==
=== Film ===
Year	Title	Role	Notes	Ref.
2006	The Book of Revelation	Man in Pub (uncredited)		
2006	BoyTown	Builder		
2007	Ghost Rider	Motorcycle Gang Member		
2008	Australia	Bull		
2009	My Year Without Sex	Tim Donnelly		
2010	Red Hill	Willy		
2010	Summer Coda	Uncle Ed		
2012	Save Your Legs!	Shadow		
2012	Crawlspace	Fourpack		
2012	Pickett's Charge	Barry Wolcott	Short film	
2012	Charlie Bonnet	Kirkland		
2013	Grandpa	Manny	Short film	
2014	Fell	Gary		
2014	Son of a Gun	Merv		
2014	Now Add Honey	Panel Beater		
2014	Mother		Short film	
2015	Downriver	Gary		
2015	Sucker	Stu		
2016	Banana Boy	Boof	Short film	
2016	Spin Out	Hammerhead Carney		
2017	1% (aka Outlaws)	Webby		
2017	What If It Works?	Baz the Removalist		
2018	The Marshes	Swagman		
2019	Judy and Punch	Nordic Man		
2019	Featherweight		Short film	
2020	Tough	Baz	Short film	
2020	Widowers	Greg	Short film	
2020	The Flood	Bushy		
2020	The Dry	McMurdo		
2020	Sweet River	Tom Evans		
2021	Lone Wolf	Rolli from Magic Carpets		
2021	Jungle	Fitz	Short film	
2022	Blueback	Merv		
2023	The Execution	Mick	Short film	
2024	Just a Farmer	Oliver		
2025	Just Kids	Logan	Short film	
2026	How to Talk Australians	Karen's Hubby		
TBA	The Mongoose	Veteran Seth	Post-production	

=== Television ===
Year	Title	Role	Notes	Ref.
2001	The Secret Life of Us	Security Guard (uncredited)	TV movie	
2001–2002	Something in the Air	Dingo / Skid Lightfoot / Entrant A	6 episodes	
2001–2002	Ponderosa	Virgil / Smitty	2 episodes	
2001, 2004	Stingers	Barry / Ernie	2 episodes	
2002, 2004	Blue Heelers	Big Bloke / Burly Orderly / Pub Patron	4 episodes	
2003	Skithouse	Prison Inmate	Episode #1.1	
2003	The Real...	Blacksmith	1 episode	
2005	Forensic Investigators	Craig Minogue	Episode: "Russell Street"	
2005, 2006	Neighbours	Spider / Edward 'Teddy' Bear	2 episodes	
2006	Real Stories	First Timer	Episode #1.1	
2008	Underbelly	The Ferret	Episode: "Luv U 4 Eva"	
2008	McLeod's Daughters	Trevor Cherry	Episode: "Dog's Life"	
2008	Comedy Slapdown	The Duke	8 episodes	
2008–2011	Rush	Charles / Honiara	4 episodes	
2009	Dirt Game	Mick	2 episodes	
2009	Whatever Happened to That Guy?	Eddie	Episode #1.8	
2010	City Homicide	Sammy Spears	Season 4, 1 episode	
2011	Killing Time	Guy 'The Dog' McDermott	2 episodes	
2012	Beaconsfield	Darren 'Geardy' Geard	TV film	
2012	Jack Irish: Black Tide	Tow Truck Driver	TV film	
2013	Die on Your Feet	Thug	Episode #1.6	
2013	Upper Middle Bogan	Scary Patient	Episode: "I'm a Swan"	
2013	It's a Date	Naggets (uncredited)	Episode: "Does Age Matter?"	
2014	Fat Tony & Co.	Scrooge	Miniseries, 4 episodes	
2014	Worst Year of My Life Again	Security Man	Episode: "Concert Tickets"	
2014	Four Quarters	Glenn	3 episodes	
2015	MyChonny Moves In	Joe	6 episodes	
2016	Black Sails	Tom	Episode: "XIX"	
2016	The Legend of Gavin Tanner	Buller	1 episode	
2016	Wolf Creek	Ginger Jurkewitz	Season 1, 3 episodes	
2016	Bruce	Flogger	1 episode	
2017	Newton's Law	Shane	Episode: "Equal and Opposite Forces"	
2018	Mystery Road	Tyson Zein	Season 1, 4 episodes	
2018	The Cry	Trucker	Episode #1.2	
2018	True Story with Hamish & Andy	Security Guard 1	Episode: "Paul"	
2019	Bad Mothers	Matty	Episode #1.3	
2019	Lambs of God	Groundsman	Miniseries, 2 episodes	
2019	Glitch	Gary	Season 3, episode: "Quintessence"	
2019	Mr Inbetween	Kevin	Season 2, 5 episodes	
2022	Irreverent	Andy	Miniseries, 4 episodes	
2023	Faraway Downs	Bull	Miniseries, 6 episodes	
2024	High Country	Lachlan Francis	Episode #1.6	
2024	Thou Shalt Not Steal	Big Pete	3 episodes	
2024	Territory	Thug / Arsonist	Miniseries, 2 episodes	
2025	Deadbeat Ends Meet	Baaarry / Rupert (voices)	Animated series, 2 episodes	
2025	Reckless	Bomber	3 episodes	

== Theatre ==
Year	Title	Role	Notes	Ref.
	The Wizard of Oz	The Cowardly Lion		
	Oliver!	Bill Sikes		
