= Fletcher Humphrys =

Australian actor (born 1976)

- Born: Australia
- Education: Sandringham College
- Occupation: Actor
- Years active: 1993–present
- Known for: All Saints; McLeod's Daughters

Fletcher Humphrys is an Australian actor. He is best known for his roles as Brett 'Brick' Buchanon in McLeod's Daughters and as Alex Kearns in All Saints.

== Early life and education ==
Humphrys attended high school at Sandringham College in Melbourne, where he studied performing arts.

== Career ==
Humphrys made his acting debut in 1993, appearing in Australian drama film The Heartbreak Kid, playing a member of Rivers' gang. His first major acting role was in the children's television series The Genie From Down Under, playing Conrad von Meister, Otto's 15-year old nephew, for the show's two seasons from 1996 to 1998. From 1996 to 1997 he also played the recurring role of Martin Pike in long-running soap opera Neighbours. He then appeared in the regular role of Tod in short-lived sci-fi series Thunderstone, in 1999, before landing a role in crime biopic Chopper opposite Eric Bana.

In 2001, Humphrys began playing the recurring role of Brett Buchanon on drama series McLeod's Daughters. He appeared in the show's first three seasons, until his character was killed off in 2003. During this time, he also played the role of Skeet in American sports telemovie The Junction Boys, opposite Tom Berenger and Ryan Kwanten and featured in the film Razor Eaters.

Following his role on McLeod's Daughters, Humphrys appeared in another recurring role, this time in medical drama All Saints, playing Alex Kearns, Scott Zinenko's (Conrad Coleby) paramedic partner, from 2003 to 2004. He was next seen in drama series Last Man Standing in 2005, playing the ongoing role of Anto, younger brother of Adam Logan (Rodger Corser). That same year, he was seen in telemovie The Glenmoore Job.

During 2006 and 2008, Humphrys appeared on soap Neighbours again, this time guest starring as Guy Sykes, a criminal acquaintance of Katya Kinski (Dichen Lachman). In 2008, he also had a role in the debut season of underworld crime series Underbelly. His character was legally not able to be named by order of the Supreme Court of Victoria, and was therefore referred to as 'Mr S'. From 2008 to 2009, Humphrys played the role of Jai in East of Everything, appearing alongside Richard Roxburgh, Tom Long and Susie Porter. He later returned to Neighbours in early 2009, reprising the role of Guy Sykes for another guest stint. His portrayal saw him nominated for "Best Bad Boy" at the 2009 Inside Soap Awards.

In 2011, Humphrys played a leading role in comedy series Small Time Gangster, and appeared alongside David Wenham in drama series Killing Time. From 2011, he appeared in a recurring guest role in long-running soap opera Home and Away, as gang leader Jake Pirovic, leader of a rival gang to the River Boys. The following year he played Wayne Milovich in telemovie Jack Irish: Bad Debts alongside Guy Pearce, and featured in sci-fi horror film Crawlspace with Samuel Johnson.

Humphrys then landed a role in Underbelly: Squizzy, the 2013 sixth season of the Underbelly franchise, this time playing the recurring role of Edward Jenkins. He reprised his role as Wayne Milovich in a second Jack Irish telemovie in 2014, this time Jack Irish: Dead Point, He also resumed his role as Jake in a second guest stint in Home and Away.

Humphrys next secured the role of Richard Milat in 2015 miniseries Catching Milat, based on the life of backpack killer Ivan Milat. He also appeared in 2015 drama film The Dressmaker alongside Kate Winslet, Judy Davis and Liam Hemsworth. He was then seen with John Jarratt as Jesus (Ben Mitchell) in 2016 six-part psychological thriller series Wolf Creek, a spin-off of the 2005 horror film of the same name. That same year, he appeared opposite Noah Taylor and Yael Stone in crime drama series Deep Water and suspense film Hounds of Love with Stephen Curry.

Humphrys was part of the supporting cast in 2018 Stan miniseries Romper Stomper, playing the role of Lyno, opposite David Wenham, Jacqueline McKenzie and Toby Wallace. The series was a sequel to the 1992 film of the same name, which starred Russell Crowe.

In 2020, Humphrys had a recurring guest role in the second season of Mystery Road, before reprising his role as Wayne in the third season of Jack Irish in 2021. He also had a recurring role in political drama series Total Control, opposite Rachel Griffiths and Deborah Mailman. He then appeared in 2022 psychological crime thriller film The Stranger with Joel Edgerton and Sean Harris, in the role of Detective Graham Ikin.

Humphrys was seen opposite Tim Roth and Lincoln Younes in the 2023 first season of underworld crime series Last King of the Cross, playing Richard Needham. That same year, he played Alf Newkirk in drama series Scrublands, before appearing in several episodes of crime drama Troppo in 2024.

Humphrys' television guest credits include A Country Practice, Blue Heelers, State Coroner, Crash Zone, Something in the Air, Eugénie Sandler P.I., Stingers, Marshall Law, Canal Road, Rush, City Homicide, Conspiracy 365, Mr & Mrs Murder, Winners & Losers, Miss Fisher’s Murder Mysteries, Deep Water, The Doctor Blake Mysteries, The Commons, Ms Fisher's Modern Murder Mysteries, High Country, and most recently Thou Shalt Not Steal. His other film credits include Guru Wayne (2002), John Doe: Vigilante (2014) and The Legend Maker (2014).

Humphrys was most recently seen as Gerry, opposite Guy Pearce, in 2024 prison drama film Inside, before going on to play the role of Rodowsky in 2025 dark comedy thriller feature Penny Lane Is Dead, writer-director Mia'Kate Russell's feature film debut.

== Awards and nominations ==
Year	Work	Award	Category	Result	Ref
2009	Neighbours	Inside Soap Awards	Best Bad Boy	Nominated	
2014	Underbelly: Squizzy	Equity Ensemble Awards	Outstanding Performance by an Ensemble in a Miniseries or Telemovie	Nominated	

== Filmography ==
=== Television ===
Year	Title	Role	Notes	Ref
1994	A Country Practice	Gary Van Loon	Episode: "Too Young"	
1994	Heartbreak High	Wez		
1994–2005	Blue Heelers	Simon Lovett / Jonathan Grant / Matt Waldron / John Hawkins	6 episodes	
1996	The Genie From Down Under	Conrad von Meister	12 episodes	
1996–1997	Neighbours	Martin Pike	10 episodes	
1997; 1998	State Coroner	Mick	Season 1, 2 episodes	
1998	The Genie From Down Under 2	Conrad von Meister	13 episodes	
1999	Crash Zone	Leo Moore	Episode: "Leap of Faith"	
1999	Thunderstone	Tod	13 episodes	
2000	Something in the Air	Daryl	Episode: "Wandering in the Wilderness"	
2000	Eugénie Sandler P.I.	Brett	Season 1, episode 10	
2001; 2002	Stingers	Steve Logan	2 episodes	
2001–2003	McLeod's Daughters	Brett 'Brick' Buchanon	18 episodes	
2002	Marshall Law	Wayne GB	Episode: "Domestic Bliss"	
2002	The Junction Boys	Skeet Keeler	TV film	
2003–2004	All Saints	Alex Kearns	52 episodes	
2005	The Glenmoore Job	Simon	TV film	
2005	Last Man Standing	Anto Logan	11 episodes	
2006	Nightmares & Dreamscapes: From the Stories of Stephen King	Duane Allman	Episode: "You Know They Got a Hell of a Band"	
2006–2007; 2009	Neighbours	Guy Sykes	19 episodes	
2007	Satisfaction	Gary	Episode: "Jizz"	
2008	Canal Road	Colin Burns	Season 1, 2 episodes	
2008–2009	East of Everything	Jai	Seasons 1–2, 10 episodes	
2008; 2010	Rush	Stace / Nat	Season 3, 2 episodes	
2008	Underbelly	Mr S	1 episode	
2010	City Homicide	Vince Rossett	Season 4, episode: "Tomato Can"	
2011	Killing Time	Graeme Jensen	Season 1, 2 episodes	
2011	Small Time Gangster	Steve	8 episodes	
2011–2014	Home and Away	Jake Pirovic	11 episodes	
2012	Conspiracy 365	Vernon	2 episodes	
2012	Bikie Wars: Brothers in Arms	Bull	Miniseries	
2012	Jack Irish: Bad Debts	Wayne Milovich	TV movie	
2013	Mr & Mrs Murder	Lorcan	1 episode	
2013	Winners & Losers	Lincoln	Season 3, 1 episode	
2013	Underbelly: Squizzy	Edward Jenkins	7 episodes	
2014	Jack Irish: Dead Point	Wayne Milovich	TV movie	
2014	Worst Year of My Life Again	Scalper	1 episode	
2015	Catching Milat	Richard Milat	2 episodes	
2015	Miss Fisher’s Murder Mysteries	Fredrick Burn	Season 3, 1 episode	
2016	Wolf Creek	Jesus (Ben Mitchell)	3 episodes	
2016	Deep Water	Brett	2 episodes	
2017	The Doctor Blake Mysteries	Dean Charles	Season 5, 1 episode	
2018	Romper Stomper	Lyno	Miniseries, 5 episodes	
2019	The Commons	Angry Driver	2 episodes	
2020	Mystery Road	Dylan	Season 2, 2 episodes	
2021	Total Control	Joshua Harvey	Season 2, 3 episodes	
2021	Ms Fisher's Modern Murder Mysteries	Melvin Delaine	Season 2, 1 episode	
2021	Jack Irish	Wayne Milovich	Season 3, 2 episodes	
2023	Last King of the Cross	Richard Needham	Season 1, 4 episodes	
2023	Scrublands	Alf Newkirk	3 episodes	
2024	High Country	Gary	1 episode	
2024	Troppo	Sharon	Season 2, 3 episodes	
2024	Thou Shalt Not Steal	Penguin	1 episode	
2026	Last Seen	Peter Mulligan	1 episode	
2026	Ground Up	Cliff	1 episode	

=== Film ===
Year	Title	Role	Notes	Ref
1993	The Heartbreak Kid	Member of Rivers' gang		
1997	Driven	Steve	Short film	
1998	Spark	Dave	Short film	
1999	Grant	Spencer	Short film	
2000	Chopper	Bucky		
2002	Guru Wayne	Garry Flannigan		
2003	Razor Eaters	Roger		
2011	Everyman	Tradie	Short film	
2012	Crawlspace	Kid		
2013	No Good Deed	Bill	Short film	
2014	Shotgun Wedding	Scouse the Robber	Short film	
2014	The Legend Maker	Toma		
2014	John Doe: Vigilante	Henry Junig		
2014	The Mule	Dave Coupland		
2015	Jack's Promise	Jack	Short film	
2015	The Dressmaker	Ticket Collector		
2016	Partners in Crime	Jake Kelly	Short film	
2016	Hounds of Love	Gary		
2020	When Morning Comes	Reg	Short film	
2022	The Stranger	Detective Graham Ikin		
2024	Inside	Gerry Munt		
2025	Penny Lane Is Dead	Rodowsky		
TBA	Salty	Frank	Short film; Completed	
	Sugarplum	Mike	Short film	

== Theatre ==
Year	Title	Role	Notes	Ref
1998	What Lies Between	Steve	Revolver	
2007	Both Sides of the Bar / The Felatio Monologues	Various	Bathroom Floor Prods	
