= The Marshes (2018 film) =

- Film poster
- Directed by: Roger Scott
- Written by: Roger Scott
- Produced by: Christine Tan
- Starring: Dafna Kronental; Sarah Armanious; Mathew Cooper; Sam Delich
- Cinematography: Giovanni C. Lorusso
- Edited by: Jessica Mutascio
- Music by: Tristan Coelho
- Production company: 28 Productions
- Distributed by: Shudder, RLJ Entertainment
- Release date: 2018 (Australia)
- Running time: 85 minutes
- Country: Australia
- Language: English

The Marshes is an Australian supernatural horror film, written and directed by Roger Scott. The film stars Dafna Kronental, Sarah Armanious, Mathew Cooper, Sam Delich. The film was released in Australia in 2018 and in the US in 2020 via Shudder.

== Plot ==
In a remote swampy area, three young biologists are conducting research to preserve the unique marshlands. But when they encounter something sinister intent on killing them, they have to forget about science and need to do everything just to survive.

== Cast ==
- Dafna Kronental as Pria
- Sarah Armanious as Kylie
- Mathew Cooper as Ben
- Sam Delich as Will
- Zac Drayson as Pig Hunter
- Amanda McGregor as Female Hunter
- Cass Cumerford as Petrol Attendant
- Eddie Baroo as Swagman
- Katie Beckett as Denise

== See also ==
- Cinema of Australia
