= The Flood (2020 film) =

2020 film

- Directed by: Victoria Wharfe McIntyre
- Written by: Victoria Wharfe McIntyre
- Produced by: Craig Deeker; Steve Jaggi; Amadeo Marquez Perez; Victoria Wharfe McIntyre
- Starring: Alexis Lane; Shaka Cook; Dean Kyrwood
- Cinematography: Kevin Scott
- Edited by: Cindy Clarkson
- Music by: Petra Salsjo
- Release date: 2020
- Running time: 117 minutes
- Country: Australia
- Language: English

The Flood is a 2020 Australian drama film written and directed by Victoria Wharfe McIntyre.

== Plot ==
Jarah Banganha goes in search of revenge.

== Cast ==
- Alexis Lane as Jarah Banganha
- Shaka Cook as Waru Banganha
- Dean Kyrwood as Shamus and Paddy MacKay
- Dalara Williams as Maggie Banganha
- Karen Garnsey as Pam Bradfield
- Peter McAllum as Gerald Mackay
- Simone Landers as Binda Banganha
- Aaron Jeffery as William 'Minto' Minton
- Eddie Baroo as Bushy

== Production ==
The Flood is Victoria Wharfe McIntyre's first full-length feature.

== Reception ==
Writing in The Australian David Stratton gave it 3 1/2 stars stating "Beautifully photographed by Kevin Scott, The Flood is in many ways spectacular, but it’s also very bitter in its depiction of the injustice and violence meted out to Indigenous Australians in the not-too-distant past, though it ends on a note of reconciliation. With her cartridge belt slung over her shoulder, the vengeful Jarah is a formidable heroine indeed. All the production values, including the beautifully illustrated credit titles, are first-class." The Sydney Morning Herald's Brad Newsome gives it a 2 1/2 star review concluding "Jimmie Blacksmith taking an axe to Ruth Cracknell it ain’t. Still, it’s always great to see a susbtantially Indigenous cast with a female lead, there are some gorgeous shots of the cast and the landscape, as well as some fine performances (notably Cook, who went on to join the Australian cast of Hamilton). Worth a look."

== Awards ==
- 10th AACTA Awards
  - Best Supporting Actor - Aaron Jeffery - nominated

== See also ==
- Cinema of Australia
