= Saturday Night (1999 film) =

1999 Australian film

- Directed by: James Balian
- Written by: James Balian
- Produced by: Charlie Doane
- Starring: Alison Whyte; Aaron Pedersen
- Cinematography: Steve MacDonald
- Edited by: James Manché
- Music by: Wayne Goodwin
- Release date: 1999
- Running time: 88 minutes
- Country: Australia
- Language: English

Saturday Night is a 1999 Australian film written and directed by James Balian and starring Alison Whyte and Aaron Pedersen. It premiered at the Edinburgh International Film Festival, played at Cinequest Film Festival on 3 March 2000 before being broadcast nationally on SBS later that year. The independent film was shot on a low budget with a super 16mm camera, shooting over two weeks late 1998.

== Synopsis ==
A late night hotline counsellor receives a call from a drunk suicidal man.

== Cast ==
- Alison Whyte as Simone
- Aaron Pedersen as Mac

== Reception ==
Dennis Harvey wrote in Variety "Earnest but repetitious, unimaginatively penned effort looks destined for modest tube sales." The Sydney Morning Herald's Doug Anderson says "On the surface, a 90-minute phone call may not appear to offer terribly many options for visual exposition these are landlines, not mobile phones but Balian (who wrote the script), his cameraman and editor seize every opportunity to illuminate, substantiate and keep the film visually engaging." Stan James in the Advertiser gave it a 2 star capsule review and Des Partridge of the Courier Mail gave it 3 stars.
