= Paul Moder (actor) =

Australian actor and film maker

Paul Moder is an Australian actor and film maker best known for his role in starring in and producing Razor Eaters.

== Education ==
Moder received a Bachelor of Arts in Film and Television from Swinburne University of Technology.

== Career ==
Several of Moder's films have debuted and won awards at the Melbourne Underground Film Festival.

In 2003, he portrayed the cop that interrogated David in James Wan and Leigh Whannell's short film Saw.

In 2016, he announced plans to write and produce a film based on the events of the Port Arthur shooting that occurred in Australia in 1996. Moder said that despite not having the support of victims' families or the community of Port Arthur, he felt it was time “to examine the event in unflinching detail, free from agenda and bias”.
