= Last Man Standing (Australian TV series) =

2005 Australian TV series

- Genre: Drama
- Created by: Geoff Deane
- Written by: Marieke Hardy; Rene Zandveld; Jeff Truman; Jaime Browne
- Directed by: Daniel Nettheim; Adrian Holmes; Emma Freeman; Elise McCredie; Steve Jodrell; Jeffrey Walker; Pino Amenta; Grant Brown; Ian Gilmore; Declan Eames
- Starring: Rodger Corser; Travis McMahon; Matt Passmore; Miriama Smith
- Opening theme: "Come See Me (I'm Your Man)" performed by Dallas Crane
- Country of origin: Australia
- Original language: English
- No. of series: 1
- No. of episodes: 22

Production
- Executive producers: Ewan Burnett; Geoff Deane
- Producers: Sue Edwards; Marieke Hardy
- Running time: 60 minutes (inc. commercials)
- Production company: Burberry Productions

Original release
- Network: Seven Network
- Release: 6 June – 25 October 2005

Last Man Standing is an Australian television series that aired in from June 2005 to October 2005 on Seven Network; and in New Zealand from April to September 2005. It was aired also in Finland (Viimeiseen mieheen) in 2007. The series did not return for a second season.

== Overview ==
The main characters are three best friends — Adam, Bruno, and Cameron — who live and work in Melbourne. Adam is newly single, having come out of a long-term relationship, and is dealing with the dating world for the first time in a long time. Cameron is the sexual predator of the group, although this role has been somewhat lessened by the fact that his ex-wife Zoe — who left when he had an affair — is now part of the group and is becoming friends with the women he dates. Bruno is a nurse who has a habit of falling for women who do not care for him, while ignoring the many women who do. All three are discovering that in their late 20s, they are still single and really have no idea about women whatsoever.

In keeping with the show's distinctly Melbourne feel, iconic Melbourne rock band Dallas Crane recorded a cover of "Come See Me", originally by the Pretty Things, for the show's theme tune. The cover can be found as a B-side to the band's "Curiosity" single.

== Cast ==
=== Main ===
- Rodger Corser as Adam Logan
- Travis McMahon as Bruno Palmer
- Matt Passmore as Cameron Kennedy
- Miriama Smith as Zoe Hesketh

=== Recurring ===
- Fletcher Humphrys as Anto Logan
- Anita Hegh as Marly
- Greg Fleet as Boxy
- Jesse Griffin as Chich
- Nikola Dubois as Taia
- Jacinta Stapleton as Syl
- Stephen Phillips as Mark
- Gillian Hardy as Anne
- Terry Kenwrick as Gavin
- Kat Stewart as Claire
- Cal Wilson as Nurse Jude Vanderwert
- Alicia Gardiner as Nurse Amelia Larkin
- Susan Godfrey as Nurse Rachel Barton
- Jane Allsop as Suzie
- Peta Sergeant as Janessa
- Sue Jones as Gil Logan
- Luke Hemsworth as Shannon Gazal

=== Guests ===
- Alexandra Schepisi as Bonnie (2 episodes)
- Asher Keddie as Jemima (1 episode)
- Benjamin McNair as Nurse Derek (1 episode)
- Brett Swain as Bret
- David Roberts as Gerry (1 episode)
- Diana Glenn as Anguk (1 episode)
- Elena Mandalis as Margot (1 episode)
- Elspeth Ballantyne as Aunty Marg (1 episode)
- Jon English as Self (1 episode)
- Kate Lister as Female Shopper (1 episode)
- Louise Crawford as Spunky girl (1 episode)
- Lucia Smyrk as Ricki (1 episode)
- Madeleine West as Janie (1 episode)
- Peter Hosking as Robert (1 episode)
- Pippa Black as Chrissie (1 episode)
- Robin McLeavy as Kellie (1 episode)
- Sam Healy as Helen (1 episode)
- Tim Robertson as Bride's Dad (1 episode)
- Zoë Ventoura as Adele (2 episodes)

== Episodes ==
No. overall	No. in season	Title	Directed by	Written by	Original Aus. air date
1	1	"Episode 1"	Daniel Nettheim	Marieke Hardy	6 June 2005
2	2	"Episode 2"	Daniel Nettheim	Marieke Hardy	13 June 2005
3	3	"Episode 3"	Adrian Holmes	Marieke Hardy	20 June 2005
4	4	"Episode 4"	Emma Freeman	Marieke Hardy	27 June 2005
5	5	"Episode 5"	Elise McCredie	Marieke Hardy	4 July 2005
6	6	"Episode 6"	Daniel Nettheim	Marieke Hardy	5 July 2005
7	7	"Episode 7"	Adrian Holmes	Marieke Hardy	11 July 2005
8	8	"Episode 8"	Emma Freeman	Marieke Hardy	19 July 2005
9	9	"Episode 9"	Steve Jodrell	Marieke Hardy	26 July 2005
10	10	"Episode 10"	Daniel Nettheim	Marieke Hardy	2 August 2005
11	11	"Episode 11"	Jeffrey Walker	Marieke Hardy	9 August 2005
12	12	"Episode 12"	Steve Jodrell	Marieke Hardy	16 August 2005
13	13	"Episode 13"	Pino Amenta	Marieke Hardy	23 August 2005
14	14	"Episode 14"	Daniel Nettheim	Jaime Brown, Marieke Hardy, David Hannam	30 August 2005
15	15	"Episode 15"	Jeffrey Walker	Marieke Hardy	6 September 2005
16	16	"Episode 16"	Grant Brown	Marieke Hardy	13 September 2005
17	17	"Episode 17"	Pino Amenta	Rene Zandveld	20 September 2005
18	18	"Episode 18"	Daniel Nettheim, Ian Gilmour	Marieke Hardy	27 September 2005
19	19	"Episode 19"	Declan Eames, Ian Gilmour	Marieke Hardy	4 October 2005
20	20	"Episode 20"	Declan Eames, Ian Gilmour	Jeff Truman, Marieke Hardy, David Hannam	11 October 2005
21	21	"Episode 21"	Emma Freeman	Marieke Hardy	18 October 2005
22	22	"Episode 22"	Daniel Nettheim	Marieke Hardy	25 October 2005

== Broadcast history ==
The series premiered in Australia on 6 June 2005 - although it premiered in New Zealand some two months earlier. It struggled to find an audience from the beginning, with an average Australian viewership of 750,000 weekly viewers. These low ratings occurred despite the show having Desperate Housewives as a lead in, which at the time was attracting over 2 million viewers a week.

It was thought by critics that Last Man Standing appealed only to "inner city lefties", unlike past successful Australian dramas such as Blue Heelers and All Saints which have more widespread demographic appeal.

Given that a full 22 episodes had been filmed before the series began airing, the Seven Network aired consistent repeats to allow the show to find an audience. Ratings didn't climb, however, and in early September, the network announced the show's cancellation. The series finale aired on 25 October. This episode ended in a cliffhanger, which - due to the show's cancellation - will remain unresolved.

The series began its airing in the UK on the FX channel in early 2006.

The series began its airing in Finland on the Sub (formerly known as Subtv) channel in June 2007.

== Home media ==
Last Man Standing: Complete First Season was released on DVD in Australia, from EMI Records on 27 November 2005.

== See also ==
- List of Australian television series
