= Peta Sergeant =

Australian actress (born 1981)

- Born: 1981 (age 44–45); Penang Island, Malaysia
- Other name: Peta Sergant
- Education: National Institute of Dramatic Art (BFA)
- Occupation: Actress
- Years active: 2001–present
- Spouse(s): Rohan Nichol (m. 2008, divorced) Jonathan Pitts (m. 2021)
- Children: 1

Peta Sergeant is a Malaysian-born Australian actress known for her role as Heather in Australian television series Satisfaction, and her roles in American series Once Upon a Time in Wonderland, playing Jabberwocky and The Originals as Francesca Guerrera. She is also known for the roles of Julia in Snowfall and Nyxlygsptlnz in Supergirl.

== Early life and education ==
Sergeant grew up in Brisbane, Queensland. She graduated from Sydney's National Institute of Dramatic Art (NIDA) in 2000.

== Career ==
As part of the Sydney 2000 Olympic Games opening ceremony, Sergeant was a member of the company that devised and performed There Is No Need to Wake Up directed by Barrie Kosky. She then co-produced and had a role in Howard Korder's Boys' Life directed by Toby Schmitz, for the 2001 Sydney Fringe Festival. The following year, she also produced and appeared in a staging of Accelerando for the Sydney Fringe.

Sergeant appeared in a 2002 episode of sci-fi television series Beastmaster, playing the role of Yamira, before landing a recurring guest role in the third season of children's sci-fi drama series Jeopardy, playing Dr Sharpe in 2004. She then played the recurring role of Janessa in 2005 Seven Network comedy-drama series Last Man Standing, opposite Rodger Corser and Matt Passmore. In 2006, she appeared opposite Aden Young and Matthew Newton in drama film The Bet. That same year, she received praise for "a stand out performance amid an excellent cast" as Indigo, in Sue Smith's play Thrall.

Sergeant had a recurring guest role in medical drama series All Saints, as surgeon Dr Bianca Frost in 2007. She also began playing a main role as opinionated lesbian call girl Heather, alongside Madeleine West and Kestie Morassi in Showcase drama series Satisfaction, about the lives of six women working in an upmarket brothel. During this time, she also starred as corrections officer Holly Chong in short-lived 2008 drama series Canal Road.

In 2009, Sergeant received critical acclaim for her portrayal of a woman on the run in Steve Rodgers' play Savage River, for Griffin Theatre Company. She was cast as Nina Cruz in the Melbourne Theatre Company production of All About My Mother, an adaptation for the stage based on the film by Pedro Almodóvar, directed by Simon Phillips. In 2010, she was awarded a Mike Walsh Fellowships Special Grant.

In 2012, Sergeant starred in sci-fi comedy action film Iron Sky as Vivian Wagner and in Australian horror film Crawlspace as Wiki. That same year, she joined the supporting cast of Australian drama series Winners & Losers as Cat Johnson. In 2013, she featured as Nurse Williams in Australian supernatural horror film Patrick: Evil Awakens, a remake of the 1970s cult classic.

In 2014, Sergeant had roles in two American series, including playing the Jabberwocky in Once Upon a Time in Wonderland and Francesca Guerrera in The Originals. In the 2015 Australian miniseries The House of Hancock, Sergeant portrayed socialite Rose Porteous, opposite Sam Neill as her iron ore magnate husband Lang Hancock and Mandy McElhinney as his daughter Gina Reinhart. Her performance saw her nominated for an AACTA Award for Best Lead Actress in a Television Drama in 2015.

Sergeant landed a lead role as Julia in American crime drama series Snowfall, appearing in the series for six seasons, from 2017 to 2023. During this time, she had guest roles in American Woman (based on the life of socialite and television personality Kyle Richards) and Castle Rock. She also played Ezera in 2020 fantasy film Heavenquest: A Pilgrim's Progress She then joined The CW's Supergirl as Nyxly in its final season in 2021.

In 2026, Sergeant landed the voice role of Jie in American animated fantasy film Avatar Aang: The Last Airbender.

== Personal life ==
Sergeant began dating actor Rohan Nichol in 2002, after meeting while acting in a play at the Sydney Fringe Festival. In 2007, the pair relocated to LA for work for a period of time, before ultimately returning to Australia.

Sergeant married American author Jonathan Pitts on 2 October 2021. According to Sergeant's Instagram page, she had a miscarriage and then delivered a stillborn baby, before welcoming a healthy son on 16 February 2024.

== Filmography ==
=== Film ===
| Year | Title | Role | Notes | Ref. |
|---|---|---|---|---|
| 2003 | George of the Jungle 2 | Attractive Woman | | |
| 2006 | The Bet | Lila | | |
| 2009 | Early Checkout | The Body | Short film | |
| 2010 | Kanowna | Osarno | Short film | |
| 2010 | Litost | Anita | Short film | |
| 2012 | Iron Sky | Vivian Wagner | | |
| 2012 | Alphamum01 | Alphamum01 | Short film | |
| 2012 | Crawlspace | Wiki | | |
| 2013 | Patrick | Nurse Williams | | |
| 2014 | Up a Tree | Sarah / Rachel | Short film | |
| 2019 | Infidel | Sandy Petzold | | |
| 2020 | Heavenquest: A Pilgrim's Progress | Ezera | | |
| 2020 | Star Wars: Squadrons – Hunted | Terisa Kerril | Short film | |
| 2026 | Avatar Aang: The Last Airbender | Jie (voice) | | |
| 2026 | Runner | Julie | | |
| TBA | Bull | Heather | Short film | |
| TBA | Blue Lotus | Trudi | In development | |

=== Television ===
| Year | Title | Role | Notes | Ref. |
|---|---|---|---|---|
| 2001 | Head Start | Nicole | 1 episode | |
| 2002 | Beastmaster | The Demon Yamira | Episode: "Turned to Stone" | |
| 2004 | Jeopardy | Dr Sharpe | Season 3, 3 episodes | |
| 2005 | Last Man Standing | Janessa | 4 episodes | |
| 2005–2006 | headLand | Rachael | 10 episodes | |
| 2006 | Two Twisted | Isabelle Dempsey | 1 episode | |
| 2006–2007 | All Saints | Dr. Bianca Frost | 6 episodes | |
| 2007–2009 | Satisfaction | Heather | Seasons 1–2, 20 episodes | |
| 2008 | Canal Road | Holly Chong | 13 episodes | |
| 2012 | Winners & Losers | Cat Johnson | Season 2, 8 episodes | |
| 2013 | The Selection | Commander Gaia Woods | TV movie | |
| 2014 | Once Upon a Time in Wonderland | Jabberwocky | 5 episodes | |
| 2014 | The Originals | Francesca Guerrera | 6 episodes | |
| 2015 | House of Hancock | Rose Porteous | Miniseries, 2 episodes | |
| 2017–2023 | Snowfall | Julia | Seasons 1–6, 18 episodes | |
| 2018 | American Woman | Hannah | Episode: "Jack" | |
| 2018 | Castle Rock | Angela / Marret | 2 episodes | |
| 2021 | Supergirl | Nyxlygsptlnz | Main cast (season 6); 18 episodes | |

=== Video games ===
| Year | Title | Role | Notes | Ref. |
|---|---|---|---|---|
| 2020 | Star Wars: Squadrons | Terisa Kerrill | | |

== Theatre ==
=== As cast ===
| Year | Title | Role | Notes | Ref. |
|---|---|---|---|---|
| 1998 | Features of Blown Youth | Isabella | NIDA Parade Theatre, Sydney | |
| 1999 | The Three Sisters | Anfisa / Ferapont | NIDA Parade Theatre, Sydney | |
| 1999 | Romeo and Juliet | Lady Capulet | NIDA Parade Theatre, Sydney | |
| 1999 | The Beaux' Stratagem | Mrs Sullen | NIDA Parade Theatre, Sydney | |
| 2000 | The Golden Age | Elizabeth Archer / Angel / Dr Simon | NIDA Parade Theatre, Sydney | |
| 2000 | Saturday Sunday Monday | Giulianella | NIDA Parade Theatre, Sydney | |
| 2000 | There is No Need to Wake Up | | Sydney Opera House with NIDA for Sydney 2000 Olympics opening ceremony | |
| 2001 | Boys' Life | | Sydney Fringe Festival | |
| 2002 | Accelerando | | Sydney Fringe Festival | |
| 2006 | Thrall | Indigo | Old Fitzroy Theatre, Sydney with Tamarama Rock Surfers, Sydney | |
| 2008; 2009 | Fake Porno | | Turbine Studio, Brisbane, Lupa Art, Melbourne with Ride On Theatre | |
| 2009 | Savage River | Jude | Stables Theatre, Sydney, Southbank Theatre, Melbourne, Theatre Royal, Hobart with Griffin Theatre Company | |
| 2010 | All About My Mother | Nina Cruz | Southbank Theatre, Melbourne with MTC | |
| 2011 | Tenderness | | Footscray Community Arts Centre, Melbourne with Platform Youth Theatre | |
| 2015 | Birdland | Jenny / Madeleine / DC Evans | Southbank Theatre, Melbourne with MTC | |

=== As crew ===
| Year | Title | Role | Notes | Ref |
|---|---|---|---|---|
| 2000 | There is No Need to Wake Up | Devisor | Sydney Opera House with NIDA for Sydney 2000 Olympics opening ceremony | |
| 2001 | Boys' Life | Co-producer | Sydney Fringe Festival | |
| 2002 | Accelerando | Producer | Sydney Fringe Festival | |
| 2011 | Courtesan Remixed, After La Dame Aux Camelias | Dramaturge | Old 505 Theatre, Sydney | |
