= 2009 ASTRA Awards =

The 7th Annual ASTRA Awards were presented on Monday, 20 April 2009 at The Entertainment Quarter in Sydney.

== Winners ==
- Channels of the Year: Nickelodeon
- Most Outstanding Performance by an Actor – Male: Wayne Hope
- Most Outstanding Performance by an Actor – Female: Alison Whyte (Satisfaction)
- Most Outstanding Performance by a Presenter: Brendon Julian
- Most Outstanding Performance by a Broadcast Journalist: David Speers
- Favourite Program: Selling Houses Australia
- Favourite International Program: Grand Designs
- Favourite International Personality or Actor: Gordon Ramsay
- Favourite Male Personality: Merrick & Rosso
- Favourite Female Personality: Ruby Rose
- Most Outstanding International Program or Event: Mad Men
- Most Outstanding Event: MTV Australia Awards 2008
- Most Outstanding Short Form Program: As the Bell Rings
- Most Outstanding Children's Program: Camp Orange: The Curse of the Emerald Eye
- Most Outstanding Music Program or Coverage: MAX Masters: Coldplay
- Most Outstanding Sports Program: An Aussie Goes Bolly
- Most Outstanding Sports Coverage: Bowl-a-Rama
- Most Outstanding Documentary: Beyond Kokoda
- Most Outstanding News Program or Coverage: Global Financial Crisis
- Most Outstanding Lifestyle Program: Selling Houses Australia
- Most Outstanding Light Entertainment Program: Project Runway Australia
- Most Outstanding Drama: Satisfaction
