= Canal Road (TV series) =

2008 Australian television series

- Genre: Drama
- Created by: Susan Bower; Louise Crane-Bowes; Jo Horsburgh
- Written by: Sarah Smith; John Ridley; Dave Warner
- Directed by: Kevin Carlin; Shawn Seet; Ian Watson
- Starring: Paul Leyden; Diana Glenn; Brooke Satchwell; Charlie Clausen; Peta Sergeant; Patrick Brammall; Alyssa McClelland
- Country of origin: Australia
- Original language: English
- No. of seasons: 1
- No. of episodes: 13

Production
- Executive producer: Jo Horsburgh
- Producer: Susan Bower
- Running time: 45 minutes

Original release
- Network: Nine Network
- Release: 16 April – 13 December 2008

Canal Road is an Australian television drama series on the Nine Network. The series was produced in-house, under producer Susan Bower, in collaboration with writers Sarah Smith, John Ridley and Dave Warner, and directed by Kevin Carlin. It was filmed at Channel Nine's GTV Studio 11 and on location in and around Melbourne. The series reportedly cost A$10 million to produce.

The 13-part series went to air from 16 April 2008. The series debuted to mixed critical reception and only average ratings, which were further eroded when the series was moved to a later timeslot. Nine removed Canal Road from its schedules after the seventh episode, which drew in only 360,000 viewers; however the eighth episode was still made available online. Nine eventually aired the remaining episodes during August and December 2008.

Canal Road was released on DVD on 4 August 2008 in Australia.

== Synopsis ==
Canal Road is a medical and legal advisory centre where the lives of inner-city professionals and their patients entwine in a story of mystery and intrigue. At the heart of the series are the tragic deaths of the wife and son of central character Spencer MacKay. Spencer is the centre's psychiatrist who is confronted by the killer of his loved ones and sets out on a journey of revenge which will implicate friends, workmates and his darkest demons.

== Cast ==
The cast of Canal Road.

- Paul Leyden as Spencer MacKay
- Diana Glenn as Olivia Bates
- Brooke Satchwell as Bridget Keenan
- André De Vanny as Danny Havesco
- Patrick Brammall as Steve Yunnane
- Peta Sergeant as Holly Chong
- Charlie Clausen as Tom Squires
- Alyssa McClelland as Skye Brady
- Sam Anderson as Henry Walter
- Grant Bowler as Detective Ray Driscoll
- Sibylla Budd as Daina Connelly
- Simon Lyndon as Daryl King
- Ian Bliss as Bradley Thompson
- Sullivan Stapleton as Jack Logan
- Fletcher Humphrys as Colin Burns

== Internet downloads ==
Since 1 April 2008, full episodes of Canal Road were offered as a free download as part of ninemsn's "Catch Up TV" service, with new episodes made available before their broadcast on Nine. In order to view them a third-party video player must be downloaded, which includes advertisements in the file and disables the ability to skip the ads.

Episodes were later made available for purchase through the iTunes Store.

== Episodes ==
No. overall	No. in series	Title	Directed by	Written by	Original release date
1	1	"Episode 1"	Kevin Carlin	Sarah Smith	16 April 2008
Dr McKay's world is thrown into turmoil when the man responsible for killing his wife and son comes back into his life.
2	2	"Episode 2"	Kevin Carlin	John Ridley	23 April 2008
Holly, a Parole office, is being stalked by one of her clients and suspects Jack Logan.
3	3	"Episode 3"	Shawn Seet	John Ridley	30 April 2008
Olivia's personal and professional lives collide when a troubled former friend, Bianca, re-enters her life.
4	4	"Episode 4"	Shawn Seet	John Ridley	7 May 2008
Steve attempts to land himself a high-profile case but his plans backfire when he falls into his old habits and has sex with a client and her mother.
5	5	"Episode 5"	Ian Watson	Sarah Smith	28 May 2008
Holly finds herself increasingly involved in Jack's criminal life, which compromises her position as a parole officer.
6	6	"Episode 6"	Ian Watson	John Ridley & Dave Warner	4 June 2008
Bridget's life spirals out of control when she is arrested for vandalism, evicted from home, and is left owing money to everyone, including her drug dealer.
7	7	"Episode 7"	Kevin Carlin	Dave Warner	18 June 2008
Skye's world is rocked when her sister, Tanya, is found murdered.
8	8	"Episode 8"	Kevin Carlin	John Ridley	10 July 2008
A young clairvoyant, who claims the voices of the deceased instructed her to kill her father, starts channeling the voice of Spence's wife.
9	9	"Episode 9"	Daniel Nettheim	Sarah Smith	12 July 2008
Dr Spence is shocked when he learns that the man who admitted having an affair with his wife was lying to cover something up.
10	10	"Episode 10"	Daniel Nettheim	Dave Warner	13 July 2008
Although claiming her relationship is over, Holly plans to break her convicted robber boyfriend, Jack, out of jail.
11	11	"Episode 11"	Ian Watson	Dave Warner	20 July 2008
Skye becomes infuriated when she learns that the person who murder her sister still hasn't been caught by the police.
12	12	"Episode 12"	Ian Watson	John Ridley	5 December 2008
When Bridget falls ill, some suspect her drug-using party lifestyle is to blame. As her symptoms worsen, however, Bridget becomes convinced that her flatmate, Diana, is trying to poison her.
13	13	"Episode 13"	Kevin Carlin	Sarah Smith	13 December 2008
Convinced that he has solved the mystery of his wife and son's murder, Spence feels free to explore a relationship with an ex-patient, Diana. Diana is later revealed to be the serial killer.

== Reception ==
In 2020, Fiona Byrne of the Herald Sun included Canal Road in her feature about "long forgotten Australian TV dramas that made viewers switch off." Byrne wrote that the series "just never clicked with audiences. It was not soap, but more of a moody, dark drama with the central character, Spencer MacKay traumatised by the death of his wife and son and hellbent on revenge."

=== Ratings ===
Episode No.	Airdate	Timeslot	Ratings (5 capital cities)	Timeslot rank	Overall nightly rank
1.01	Wednesday 16 April 2008	21:30 – 22:30	1,089,000	1st	12th
1.02	Wednesday 23 April 2008	21:30 – 22:30	811,000	3rd	20th
1.03	Wednesday 30 April 2008	22:30 – 23:30	433,000	–	28th
1.04	Wednesday 7 May 2008	22:30 – 23:30	386,000	–	–
1.05	Wednesday 28 May 2008	22:30 – 23:30	372,000	–	–
1.06	Wednesday 4 June 2008	22:30 – 23:30	308,000	–	–
1.07	Wednesday 18 June 2008	22:30 – 23:30	360,000	–	42nd
1.08	Sunday 10 August 2008	22:30 – 23:30	259,000	–	–
1.09	Tuesday 12 August 2008	22:30 – 23:30	340,000	–	–
1.10	Wednesday 13 August 2008	22:30 – 23:30	345,000	–	–
1.11	Wednesday 20 August 2008	22:30 – 23:30	306,000	–	–
1.12	Friday 5 December 2008	22:45 – 23:45	288,000	–	–
1.13	Saturday 13 December 2008	22:30 – 23:30	—N/a	–	–

== See also ==
- List of Australian television series
