= List of Satisfaction episodes =

The following is a list of episodes for the Australian television series, Satisfaction. The series began its first season on 5 December 2007 and finished its third and final season on 9 February 2010. It aired on the Showcase channel in Australia.

== Series overview ==
Series	Episodes	Originally released	
Series	Episodes	First released	Last released
1	10	5 December 2007	30 January 2008
2	10	2 December 2008	3 February 2009
3	10	8 December 2009	9 February 2010

== Episodes ==
=== Season 1 (2007–08) ===
No. overall	No. in season	Title	Directed by	Written by	Original release date
1	1	"Running Girl"	Ken Cameron	Roger Simpson	5 December 2007
2	2	"Mrs. Hyde"	Ken Cameron	Fiona Seres	5 December 2007
3	3	"Jizz"	Paul Moloney	Matt Ford	12 December 2007
4	4	"Lauren Rising"	Paul Moloney	Katherine Thomson	19 December 2007
5	5	"Truth"	Daina Reid	Deb Cox	26 December 2007
6	6	"Family"	Daina Reid	Roger Simpson	2 January 2008
7	7	"Rubber Dubber"	Ken Cameron	Katherine Thomson	9 January 2008
8	8	"Zipless"	Ken Cameron	Fiona Seres, Samantha Winston	16 January 2008
9	9	"Paying For It"	Paul Moloney	Matt Ford	23 January 2008
10	10	"Slaying The Goat"	Paul Moloney	Matt Ford	23 January 2008

=== Season 2 (2008–09) ===
No. overall	No. in season	Title	Directed by	Written by	Original release date
11	1	"Last Look"	Paul Moloney	Matt Ford	2 December 2008
12	2	"Pony Girl"	Paul Moloney	Samantha Winston	9 December 2008
13	3	"What Do You Love"	Steve Jodrell	Samantha Winston	16 December 2008
14	4	"Playground"	Steve Jodrell	Jo Martino	23 December 2008
15	5	"A Good Eye For Shoes"	Catriona McKenzie	Matt Ford	30 December 2008
16	6	"Gene Therapy"	Catriona McKenzie	Shelley Birse	6 January 2009
17	7	"All Those Monkeys"	Daniel Nettheim	Matt Ford	13 January 2009
18	8	"Cyclone Chloe"	Daniel Nettheim	Shelley Birse	20 January 2009
19	9	"Apples"	Paul Moloney	Samantha Winston	27 January 2009
20	10	"Split Kisses"	Paul Moloney	Samantha Winston	3 February 2009

=== Season 3 (2009–10) ===
No. overall	No. in season	Title	Directed by	Written by	Original release date
21	1	"Amy"	Steve Jodrell	Matt Ford	8 December 2009
22	2	"Tess"	Steve Jodrell	Roger Simpson	15 December 2009
23	3	"Out of Tune"	Sian Davies	Samantha Winston	22 December 2009
24	4	"Sheik Your Body"	Sian Davies	Shelley Birse	29 December 2009
25	5	"Non Standard Package"	Ian Watson	Meaghan Rodriguez	6 December 2010
26	6	"Staples, Guns and Roses"	Ian Watson	Jo Martino	12 January 2010
27	7	"Playthings"	Ken Cameron	Matt Ford	19 January 2010
28	8	"Not Vanilla"	Ken Cameron	Shelley Birse	26 January 2010
29	9	"Bug Crush"	Paul Moloney	Matt Ford	2 February 2010
30	10	"Lifesavers"	Paul Moloney	Shelley Birse	9 February 2010
