= Boys' Life (play) =

American play written by Howard Korder

Boys’ Life is an American play written by Howard Korder and first produced by the Atlantic Theater Company in 1988. It was picked up as a last minute replacement of a play in Lincoln Center Theater's season at the Mitzi E. Newhouse Theater, receiving strongly positive reviews, an extended run, and a Pulitzer Prize nomination for Korder. It was directed by William H. Macy, with incidental music by David Yazbek. It starred Clark Gregg, Felicity Huffman, Steven Goldstein, Jordan Lage, Melissa Bruder and Mary McCann.
