= Action Earth =

- Genre: Environmental
- Narrated by: Ian Thorpe
- Country of origin: Australia
- Original language: English
- No. of seasons: 1
- No. of episodes: 20

Production
- Running time: 5 minutes

Original release
- Network: The Weather Channel / FOX8
- Release: 14 May 2007 – present

Action Earth is an Australian environmental series that aired on The Weather Channel and FOX8. It is narrated by Olympic medallist Ian Thorpe.

Action Earth was produced as a 20-part series, with each episode 5 minutes long. Each episode focuses on a different environmental aspect, and aims to educate the public on improving our planet.
