= Camille Keenan =

New Zealand actress

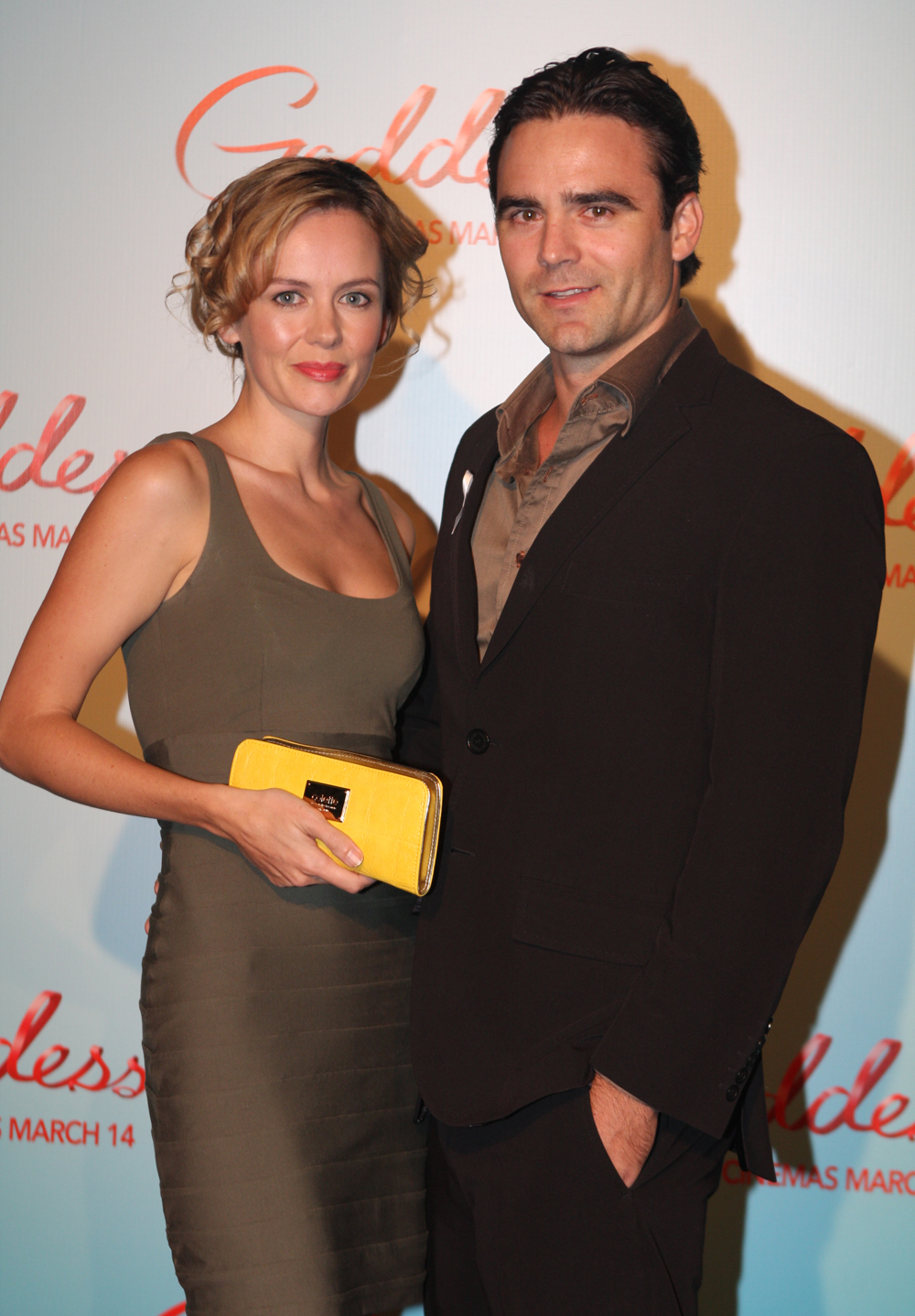
- Dustin Clare and Camille Keenan (2013)
- Born: Camille Keenan; 1985 (age 40–41); Wellington, New Zealand
- Citizenship: New Zealand
- Occupation: Actress
- Spouse: Dustin Clare (m. 2002)

Camille Keenan is an actress from New Zealand best known for her roles in Australian TV programmes.

== Career ==
Keenan has appeared in numerous films including Blackspot (as Ellen) and 30 Days of Night (as Kirsten). Her New Zealand television roles include appearances in such series as City Homicide, The Insider's Guide To Love, Sensing Murder and Burying Brian. She played a small part in the movie Avatar which was partially shot in Wellington, but her scene was cut from the final release.

Keenan moved to Melbourne, Australia in 2009 when she landed a core cast role as Amy in the TV series Satisfaction. And as Dolly Grey in Underbelly Squizzy.

In 2010 Keenan joined the cast of Ten's critically acclaimed police drama Rush as intelligence officer Audrey Khoo.

For her work in Satisfaction Keenan was shortlisted for 'Most Popular New Female Talent' and nominated for 'Most Outstanding New Talent' at the Australian Logie Awards of 2010.

Keenan won Best New Talent at the 2010 ASTRA Awards.

In 2011 Keenan joined Packed to the Rafters as guest cast, playing Bree Jennings for twelve episodes.

In 2012 Keenan and Australian actor Dustin Clare together with director Michelle Joy Lloyd and cinematographer Ryan Alexander Lloyd wrote and produced the film Sunday which Keenan and Clare also starred in. Sunday premiered in New Zealand in December 2014 and went on to feature in a range of film festivals around the world throughout 2015. Camille Keenan won Best Actress for her performance in the film at the 2015 New York City Independent Film Festival.

== Personal life ==
Keenan was born and educated in Wellington, New Zealand and has seven siblings. She married Australian actor Dustin Clare in 2002.
