= 2007 ASTRA Awards =

The 5th Annual ASTRA Awards were presented on Monday 23 April 2007 at the Hordern Pavilion in Sydney.

Four new awards was added to the Marketing and Promotions category this year:

- Most Outstanding Creative Campaign
- Most Creative Off-air Promotion (For a Program, Series or Event)
- Most Outstanding Program Promotion Campaign
- Most Creative Use of Technology for a Consumer Application

Performers at the awards included Australian acts, Evermore, Sneaky Sound System, and Juke Kartel.

== Marketing and Promotions ==
Most Outstanding Consumer Campaign – Subscription Sales
Winner:

The Sci Fi Channel Launch - Sci Fi Channel, Austar, Foxtel

Nominated:

Reaching Mums with Kids and Twenty- Somethings - Austar
Foxtel 'Nothing' Campaign - Foxtel
Pricing and Packaging Campaign - Foxtel
The Sci Fi Channel Launch - Sci Fi Channel, Austar, Foxtel

Most Outstanding Consumer Campaign – Subscriber Retention
Winner:

Honeymoon Retention Campaign: Make the Most of Your Foxtel Digital – Foxtel

Nominated:

New Repackage Austar Digital - Austar
Honeymoon Retention Campaign: Make the Most of Your Foxtel Digital – Foxtel

Most Outstanding Creative Marketing Campaign
Winner:

UNKNOWN

Nominated:

Seven Deadly Sins - World Movies
Foxtel iQ 'FREEZE' Campaign - Foxtel
Gotta Love Your League - Fox Sports

Most Outstanding use of Subscription Television Medium for a Consumer Advertising Campaign
Winner:

Sony Dedicated Advertiser Location - Multi Channel Network/Starcom

Nominated:

Sony Dedicated Advertiser Location - Multi Channel Network/Starcom
Toyota Dedicated Advertiser Location - Multi Channel Network/The Media Store
SEEK Make Luck Happen Promotion - The Weather Channel

Most Creative On-Air Program Promotion
Winner:

Budgie Nation - MTV

Nominated:

Image Spot - FOX Classics
An Aussie Goes Barmy - FOX8
Budgie Nation - MTV
Project Runway - Arena
2006 French Open - Fox Sports

Most Creative Off-Air Program Promotion
Winner:

Rock Star: Supernova "It's Gonna Be Big" Campaign - FOX8

Nominated:

Great BBQ Challenge - LifeStyle Food
Rock Star: Supernova "It's Gonna Be Big" Campaign - FOX8
The Sci-Fi Channel Launch - Sci Fi
Stupid Stupid Man - TV1

Most Outstanding Program Promotion Campaign
Winner:

Entourage – Arena

Nominated:

Rock Star: Supernova "It's Gonna Be Big" Campaign - FOX8
High School Musical - Disney Channel
Budgie Nation - MTV
Channel [V]: ARIA Awards - Channel [V]
Entourage – Arena

Most Creative Use of Technology (for a consumer application)
Winner:

High School Musical Dance Off – Disney Channel

Nominated:

Eeeaster Frasier Interactive Marathon - TV1
High School Musical Dance Off - Disney Channel
Sky News: Anytime, Anywhere - Sky News
Supernova - UK.TV

== Talent ==
Favourite International Personality or Actor (public vote)
Winner

Paul Snr. and Paul Jnr. Teutul (American Chopper) – Discovery Channel

Favourite Male Personality (public vote)
Winner

Steve Irwin – Animal Planet

Favourite Female Personality (public vote)
Winner

Antonia Kidman – W. Channel

Most Outstanding Performance by an Actor – Male
Winner

Dan Wyllie (Love My Way) – W. Channel

Most Outstanding Performance by an Actor – Female
Winner

Asher Keddie (Love My Way) – W. Channel

Most Outstanding Performance by a Presenter
Winner

David Speers (Agenda) – Sky News

== Hall of Fame: Channel of The Year ==
Hall of Fame - Channel of The Year
Winner:

Nickelodeon

Nominated:

FOX 8
Sky News
Nickelodeon
Fox Sports
