= Satisfaction (Australian TV series) =

Australian TV drama series (2007–2010)

- Logo for the series
- Genre: Drama
- Created by: Roger Simpson
- Starring: Kestie Morassi; Alison Whyte; Madeleine West; Diana Glenn; Peta Sergeant; Bojana Novakovic; Dustin Clare; Camille Keenan; Renai Caruso
- Country of origin: Australia
- Original language: English
- No. of seasons: 3
- No. of episodes: 30 (list of episodes)

Production
- Executive producer: Kim Vecera
- Producers: Roger Simpson; Andy Walker
- Running time: 50 minutes

Original release
- Network: Showcase
- Release: 5 December 2007 – 9 February 2010

Satisfaction is an Australian television drama series which screened on the subscription television channel Showcase. It also screens in the Republic of Ireland on free-to-air channel TV3 and its sister channel 3e, and in New Zealand on free-to-air channel TV2 respectively.

The series was filmed in Melbourne, and was created by writer/producer Roger Simpson with producer Andy Walker and executive producer Kim Vecera. It centres on the lives and loves of a group of women who are sex workers in a high class brothel.

Production for the third season began in June 2009 and commenced screening in December 2009.

On 31 December 2010, it was revealed by TV Tonight that Satisfaction was officially cancelled, and that season 3 was the last season in production.

== Synopsis ==
Satisfaction is set in and around '232', an up-market city brothel. The show is centred on five high class escorts and their manager as they juggle the pressures of their private lives with their profession. Chloe tells her 14-year-old daughter that she works in a casino, but realises that she will fairly soon learn the truth. Mel is being pursued by Nick, the owner of '232', whose daughter, Natalie, is the manager. Tippi, a beautiful and vivacious young blonde, is taking classes in creative writing. Heather, a dominatrix, is a lesbian whose partner, Ally, is desperate to have a baby. Lauren, an older woman who works as receptionist, is toying with the idea of moving away from the desk and becoming a sex worker.

== Cast ==
Season one main cast members (l. to r.), Diana Glenn as Chloe, Madeleine West as Mel, Kestie Morassi as Natalie, Peta Sergeant as Heather, Bojana Novakovic as Tippi, and Alison Whyte as Lauren

=== Main ===
Character	Actor	Seasons		
Character	Actor	1	2	3
Natalie	Kestie Morassi	Main	Main	Main
Melanie (Mel)	Madeleine West	Main	Main	Main
Lauren	Alison Whyte	Main	Main	Main
Chloe	Diana Glenn	Main	Main	
Tippi	Bojana Novakovic	Main	Main	
Heather	Peta Sergeant	Main	Main	
Sean	Dustin Clare		Recurring	Main
Amy	Camille Keenan			Main
Tess	Renai Caruso			Main

=== Recurring ===
Character	Actor	Seasons		
Character	Actor	1	2	3
Nick	Robert Mammone	Recurring	Guest	
Josh	Sullivan Stapleton	Recurring	Recurring	
Bonnie	Rebecca Moore	Recurring	Guest	
Alexander	Nicholas Bell	Recurring		
John McCoy	Robert Taylor		Recurring	Recurring
Bill	Tamblyn Lord		Recurring	
Jack	Bernard Curry		Recurring	
Gillian	Jacki Weaver		Recurring	
Karl	Shane Connor			Recurring
Bernie	Todd MacDonald			Recurring
Daniel	Grant Bowler			Recurring

=== Guests ===
- Andrew Blackman as Tom (1 episode)
- Arianthe Galani as Mrs G (2 episodes)
- Benjamin McNair as Truckie (1 episode)
- Blair Venn as Hank (3 episodes)
- Christopher Milne as Funeral Celebrant (1 episode)
- Dan Spielman as Robbie (1 episode)
- Danielle Carter as Margot (2 episodes)
- Damian Walshe-Howling as Gino (2 episodes)
- Ditch Davey as Rosso (1 episode)
- Fletcher Humphrys as Gary (1 episode)
- Georgina Naidu as Angela Bangrove (2 episodes)
- Heather Mitchell as Georgia (1 episode)
- Jeremy Stanford as Turnball (3 episodes)
- Jonny Pasvolsky as Zoron (2 episodes)
- Kate Fitzpatrick as Fran (1 episode)
- Mark Raffety as Ralph (3 episodes)
- Paul Denny as Martin (3 episodes)
- Penny McNamee as Shop Assistant (1 episode)
- Peter Curtin as Dr De Courcy (3 episodes)
- Richard Davies as Trent Davis (2 episodes)
- Ryan Johnson as Steve (2 episodes)
- Steve Mouzakis as Gottleib (1 episode)
- Steven Vidler as Terrence (3 episodes)

== Reception ==
The series received very positive reviews from critics in Australia. The West Australian gave the show rave reviews, saying "the characters are fleshed out, the drama is feasible and the script is sophisticated enough to side-step the obvious clichés of the sex industry. While the setting and characters are glamorous and gorgeous, there are no Pretty Woman-style illusions about the job...". TV Tonight also thought the series was quite good, noting that "for all its empathy Satisfaction is like dipping your toes into a warm bath and sipping on the best champagne. It skews consciously toward the high end of prostitution to ample success. But like their wealthy clients, you’ll need to be a high-class customer of Foxtel to slip off your shoes first, an irony some programmers may have missed."

In 2014, an American series titled Satisfaction debuted. Although it shared a title with the Australian series, and also dealt with the topic of escorting, the series is not related to this one.

== Home media ==
=== DVD Releases ===
Title	Format	Ep #	Discs	Region 4 (Australia)	Special features	Distributors
Satisfaction	DVD	10	3	2007	Behind The Scenes	Magna Home Entertainment
Satisfaction (Season 02)	DVD	10	3	2008	Behind the Scenes	Magna Home Entertainment
Satisfaction 3	DVD	10	3	2009	Behind the Scenes	Magna Home Entertainment
Satisfaction: The Complete Series	DVD	38	3	2 June 2021	Behind the Scenes	Via Vision Entertainment

== Awards and nominations ==
Awards and Nominations for Satisfaction
Year	Award	Category	Recipients	Result
2008	AFI Awards	Best Lead Actress in Television Drama	Alison Whyte	Nominated
2008	AFI Awards	Best Lead Actress in Television Drama	Diana Glenn	Nominated
2008	AFI Awards	Best Direction in Television	Daina Reid	Nominated
2008	AFI Awards	Best Television Drama Series	Andrew Walker & Roger Simpson	Nominated
2008	ASTRA Awards	Most Outstanding Performance by an Actor – Female	Alison Whyte	Nominated
2008	ASTRA Awards	Most Outstanding Performance by an Actor – Female	Bojana Novakovic	Nominated
2008	ASTRA Awards	Most Outstanding Performance by an Actor – Female	Diana Glenn	Nominated
2008	ASTRA Awards	Favourite Drama Series	cast and crew	Nominated
2008	ASTRA Awards	Outstanding Drama Series	Andrew Walker & Roger Simpson	Nominated
2008	Logie Awards	Most Outstanding Actress	Alison Whyte	Won
2008	Logie Awards	Most Outstanding Actress	Diana Glenn	Nominated
2008	Logie Awards	Most Outstanding Drama Series	Andrew Walker & Roger Simpson	Nominated
2009	AFI Awards	Best Television Drama Series	Andrew Walker & Roger Simpson	Nominated
2009	ASTRA Awards	Most Outstanding Performance by an Actor – Female	Alison Whyte	Won
2009	ASTRA Awards	Most Outstanding Performance by an Actor – Female	Madeleine West	Nominated
2009	ASTRA Awards	Outstanding Drama Series	Andrew Walker & Roger Simpson	Won
2009	APRA Awards	Best Television Theme	Cameron Giles-Webb, Colin Simkins	Won
2009	AWGIE Awards	Television Series	Jo Martino	Nominated
2009	Logie Awards	Most Outstanding Actor	Dustin Clare	Nominated
2009	Logie Awards	Most Outstanding Actress	Madeleine West	Nominated
2010	ASTRA Awards	Best New Talent	Camille Keenan	Won
2010	Logie Awards	Most Outstanding New Talent	Camille Keenan	Nominated

== International broadcasters ==
After its 2008 Australian release, Satisfaction was sold to over 30 countries across the world:

- Argentina on I.Sat
- Belgium on vtm
- Brazil on HBO and GNT
- Bulgaria on AXN
- Canada on Super Écran and Super Channel
- Chile on HBO and I.Sat
- Colombia on HBO
- Costa Rica on HBO
- Czech Republic on AXN and TV Barrandov
- Denmark on TV2 Zulu
- Estonia on Kanal 2
- Finland on MTV3
- Hungary on AXN
- Ireland on TV3 and 3e
- Israel on HOT3
- Italy on Fox Life and Cielo
- Japan on Fox Life
- Mexico on HBO
- New Zealand on TV2 (New Zealand)
- North Macedonia on Kanal 5
- Norway on TV Norge
- Paraguay on HBO and HBO Plus
- Poland on AXN and TVN Style
- (Portugal) on SIC Mulher and AXN Black
- South Africa on M-Net
- Russia on MZTV and SONYENTERTEIMENT
- Bosnia and Herzegovina of TVSA
- France on Paris Première
- United Kingdom on ITV2
- Venezuela on HBO
- Greece on Makedonia TV Makedonia TV

== See also ==
- List of Australian television series
