= Dustin Clare =

Australian actor (born 1982)

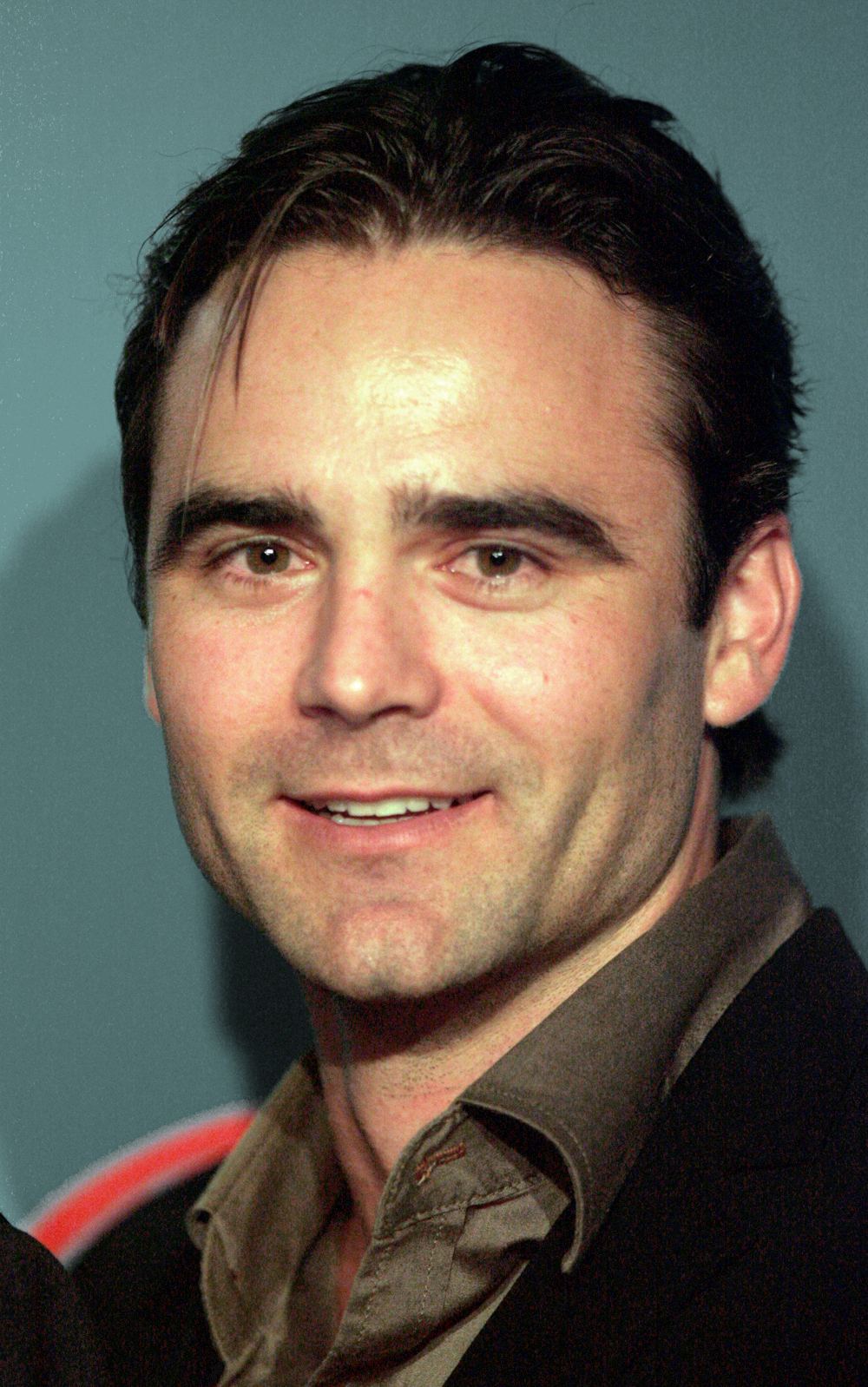
- Born: 2 January 1982 (age 44); Grafton, New South Wales, Australia
- Occupation: Actor
- Years active: 2003–present
- Spouse: Camille Keenan (m. 2002)
- Children: 1

Dustin Clare (born 2 January 1982) is an Australian actor. He is known for his starring role as Gannicus in the Starz series Spartacus: Gods of the Arena, Spartacus: Vengeance and Spartacus: War of the Damned, and as Riley Ward on the series McLeod's Daughters.

== Personal life ==
Clare is from Australia. Born in Grafton, he grew up in both Ballina, NSW and Maclean, NSW. Clare studied at the Western Australian Academy of Performing Arts in Perth, he graduated in 2004.

He served as a 2012 ambassador for the Warrambeen Film Festival. He is also an ambassador for the White Ribbon Foundation.

== Career ==
From 2006 to 2007, Clare starred as Riley Ward in 48 episodes of the series McLeod's Daughters. In 2009, he played Sydney hit-man and gangland figure Christopher Dale Flannery in Underbelly: A Tale of Two Cities and also as Sean in the Showtime Network (Australia) series Satisfaction.

His global fame occurred when he starred as Gannicus, the champion gladiator of the House of Batiatus, in Spartacus: Gods of the Arena. This is the prequel to the series Spartacus: Blood and Sand and the second season chronologically of release. He returned to his role as Gannicus in the two sequel seasons to Spartacus: Blood and Sand entitled Spartacus: Vengeance and Spartacus: War of the Damned.

He received a 2007 Logie Award for McLeod's Daughters, and a 2015 Equity Ensemble Award for ANZAC Girls.

== Filmography ==
=== Film ===
Year	Title	Role	Notes	Ref.
2003	Brothers	Ethan	Short film	
2006	Iron Bird	Jonathan Paul Harmer JP	Short film	
2008	Cane Cutter	Roo	Short film; also writer and producer	
2009	Early Checkout	Dan	Short film; also writer and producer	
2010	Happenstance	Ex Boyfriend	Short film	
2010	Kanowna	Trooper Brown	Short film; also associate producer	
2011	The Eye of the Storm	Col		
2013	Goddess	Rory		
2013	The Fragments	Jason	Short film; also executive producer	
2014	Love is Now	James		
2014	Sunday	Charlie	Also writer and producer	
2018	Pacific Rim Uprising	Joseph Burke		
2022	Seriously Red	George Michael		
2024	With or Without You	Cowboy		

=== Television ===
Year	Title	Role	Notes	Ref.
2005	All Saints	Rick Fallon	Episode: "New Beginnings"	
2005	HeadLand	Gareth Williams	Recurring role; 6 episodes	
2006–2007	McLeod's Daughters	Riley Ward	Main role; 48 episodes (seasons 6–7)	
2007	Air Australia	Sir Charles Kingsford Smith	Miniseries; 2 episodes	
2008–2010	Satisfaction	Sean	Main role; 18 episodes (seasons 2–3)	
2009	Underbelly	Christopher Dale Flannery	Recurring role; 8 episodes (season 2)	
2011	Spartacus: Gods of the Arena	Gannicus	Miniseries; 6 episodes	
2012	Spartacus: Vengeance	Gannicus	Main role; 7 episodes	
2013	Spartacus: War of the Damned	Gannicus	Main role; 10 episodes	
2014	ANZAC Girls	Lieutenant Harry Moffitt	Main role; 6 episodes	
2015	Strike Back: Legacy	Faber	Recurring role; 4 episodes (season 5)	
2016	Wolf Creek	Sullivan Hill	Main role; 6 episodes (season 1)	
2018	Tidelands	Pat McTeer	Recurring role; 6 episodes	
2019	Rosehaven	Farmer Dan	Recurring role; 3 episodes (season 3)	
2019	Reef Break	Richard Stuyler	Recurring role; 5 episodes	
2019	Doctor Doctor	Jarrod	Main role; 10 episodes (season 4)	
2019	Glitch	Mark Clayton-Stone	Main role; 6 episodes (season 3)	
2021	Eden	Huckleberry	Main role; 7 episodes	
2022–2023	Surviving Summer	Thommo Gibson	Recurring role; 14 episodes	
2023	Almost Paradise	Erik	Episode: "Uncoupled"	
2023	NCIS: Sydney	Porter / Kane	Episode: "Extraction"	
2025	Good Cop, Bad Cop	Silvio Oliveria	Episode: "Buckle Up"	

== Awards ==
Year	Work	Award	Category	Result
2007	McLeod's Daughters	Logie Awards	Silver Logie Award for Most Popular New Male Talent	Won
2008–2010	Satisfaction	Logie Awards	Silver Logie Award for Best Actor	Nominated
2015	ANZAC Girls	Equity Ensemble Awards	Outstanding Performance by an Ensemble in a Miniseries / Telemovie	Won
