= 2011 ASTRA Awards =

The 9th Annual ASTRA Awards was an event held on Thursday, 21 July 2011 at the Sydney Theatre. The ASTRA Pioneer Award and the ASTRA Industry Excellence Awards were presented prior to the ceremony at the annual ASTRA Conference, also held in Sydney, on 29 March 2011.

== ASTRA Pioneer Award ==
The second annual ASTRA Pioneer Award was presented to David Malone, CEO of the Premier Media Group.

== ASTRA Industry Excellence Awards ==
=== Platform Marketing ===
Award	Campaign	Recipient	Finalists	Ref.
Most Outstanding Marketing Campaign – Subscription Sales	iQ Consideration Campaign	Foxtel	EOFYS 11 (Foxtel); Try a New Life (Austar); $1 a day (Austar)	
Most Outstanding Marketing Campaign – Subscriber Retention/Extension	Christmas in HD	Austar	Austar for Business HD Sports Campaign (Austar); Austar Rewards Trial (Austar)	
Most Outstanding Use of Subscription Television Medium for a Consumer Advertising Campaign	Aussie – Selling Houses Australia	The LifeStyle Channel	Jack Daniel's JD Set (Multi Channel Network & UM (Channel [V])); Nivea Visage and Australia's Next Top Model, Series 6 (Multi Channel Network & OMD Fuse (Fox8))	

=== Program and Channel Promotion ===
Award	Promotion	Recipient	Finalists	Ref.
Best On-Air Program Promotion	Grand Designs: Imagine Building a Home Here	The LifeStyle Channel	Australia's Next Top Model, Series 6 Launch (Fox8)); Tough Nuts – Coming Soon (The Crime and Investigation Network); Spirited Launch Campaign (W Channel)	
Most Outstanding Channel Image Spot	Channel [V] – For The Love of Music	Channel [V]	Sci Fi Plus 2 (Sci Fi Channel)); Vancouver Winter Olympic Games (Foxtel); Get into UKTV (UKTV); Honk if You're Human (BBC Knowledge)	
Best PR/Communications Campaign	Ben 10 Ultimate Alien 10.10.10	Cartoon Network	Bear Grylls (Discovery Channel)); Grand Designs Australia (The LifeStyle Channel); Great Migrations Launch (National Geographic Channel)	
Best Off-Air Program Promotion	Grand Designs Australia	The LifeStyle Channel	ZingZillas Series Launch (CBeebies)); Ben 10: Ultimate Alien (Cartoon Network); Matthew Hayden’s Home Ground (The LifeStyle Channel); [V] Guerilla Gigs (Channel [V])	
Best Marketing Campaign Under $50,000	The Big Report	The Weather Channel	Ultimate Alien Hunt (Cartoon Network)	
Best Social/Digital Media Promotion	[V] Oz Artist 2010	Channel [V]	Delhi Commonwealth Games Campaign (Foxtel); Grand Designs Australia (The LifeStyle Channel); [V] Guerilla Gigs (Channel [V])	

=== Technology ===
Award	Promotion	Recipient	Finalists	Ref.
Most Outstanding Use of Technology	Vancouver Winter Olympic Games	Foxtel	weatherchannel.com.au Relaunch (The Weather Channel); Australian TV’s First Ever 3D Sports Broadcast (Fox Sports)	
Most Outstanding Use of Interactive Television	Australia's Next Top Model – Chat On	Fox8	Vancouver Winter Olympic Games (Foxtel)	
