= Madeleine West =

Australian actress, author and director (born 1979)

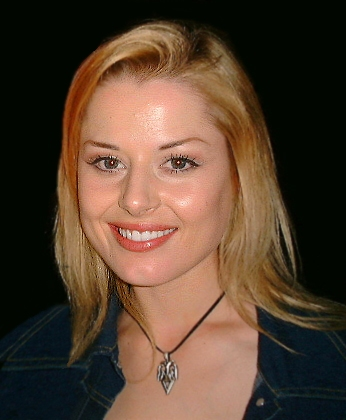
- West in 2001
- Born: Melanie Ann Weston; 26 July 1979 (age 47); Woodend, Victoria, Australia
- Occupations: Actress; author; director
- Years active: 1999–present
- Partner: Shannon Bennett (2005–2018)
- Children: 7

Melanie Ann Weston (born 26 July 1979), known professionally as Madeleine West, is an Australian actress, author and director. She is best known for her television roles, having played Dee Bliss and Andrea Somers on the soap opera Neighbours from 2000 to 2003 and on-off 2017 to 2020, high-class escort Mel on Satisfaction from 2007 to 2010, Dimity on House Husbands in 2013, Danielle McGuire in Underbelly and later Fat Tony & Co. In 2016, West joined the cast of The Wrong Girl. She has also written a parenting book called Six Under Eight. She played Sarah the wife of Stone Cold Steve Austin in the WWE produced film The Condemned in 2007.

== Early life ==
Born Melanie Ann Weston, West was born and raised in Woodend. She attended Woodend Primary School and eight high schools because her family followed her stepfather's engineering work around the country. West began performing in front of family and friends at an early age. In 1992, she entered the New South Wales Talented Child Drama Ensemble and later studied at Swinburne University of Technology, Tamworth Conservatorium of Music, and Riverina Drama Ensemble.

== Career ==
After commencing a degree in law at Deakin University, West deferred her studies indefinitely to turn to acting. In 1999, West was awarded the 'Be Your Best' Performance Scholarship from the Australian Drug Foundation. West's amateur theatre credits include Arsenic and Old Lace, Night Reflections, Theatre in the Raw, Bye Bye Birdie, and Snow Queen.

West joined the cast of Neighbours as Dee Bliss in 1999. Two years later, she was nominated for the "Most Popular New Female Talent" Logie Award. In March 2003, it was announced West was to leave Neighbours after her contract expired. She filmed her final scenes in early April.

West appeared in crime drama Underbelly as Danielle McGuire in 2008. In 2011, she joined the cast of Winners & Losers in the recurring role of Deidre Gross. West previously turned down a role with the show due to being heavily pregnant with her third child.

In 2013, West appeared in series two of House Husbands as Dimity. She reprised her role of Danielle McGuire in the Underbelly spin-off series Fat Tony & Co.. The series focuses on the rise and fall of Tony Mokbel, who also featured in the original series, played by Robert Mammone. She also made a guest appearance in an episode of Mr & Mrs Murder as a receptionist.

In 2017, West returned to Neighbours to play Andrea Somers, a lookalike who posed as Dee Bliss. West also joined the cast of The Wrong Girl as TV host Erica Jones. Her first book titled Six Under Eight was published in March of that year. West has since launched a series of children's books called Lily D, V.A.P. (Very Amazing Performer). The books focus on topics such as bullying, illness and body image, and are told through schoolgirl Lily as she takes on different characters for a play.

West worked with former detective Gary Jubelin on the 2023 eight-part podcast series Predatory, which brings attention to child sexual abuse. The podcast called for Australia's sex offender registry to be made public and for victims to be fairly compensated.

In 2024, West joined Broad Radio in a guest host capacity.

== Personal life ==
In July 2002, West was hit by a bus in Sydney. The actress was also robbed while she was unconscious. She needed reconstructive plastic surgery and had to be written out of Neighbours but returned to the show a month later.

West was engaged to Shopping for Love co-host Pete Lazer, before entering into a relationship with Shannon Bennett, a restaurateur, in 2005. The couple have six children together. In September 2018, West confirmed that she and Bennett had separated, but were "striving to reconnect as friends and parents".

West was in a relationship with environmentalist Maximo Bottaro. They met in 2020 while West was volunteering at his organisation ReForest Now.

On 13 January 2025, West announced that she was pregnant, after initially assuming her symptoms were related to perimenopause. She announced that she had given birth to her seventh child on 20 April 2025.

=== Sexual abuse ===
In January 2023, West revealed she was sexually abused as a child; the abuse began when she was 4 years old and continued until she was 10. She said, "Part of the reason I went into acting was to wear someone else's skin, to hide what was actually happening in my life".

West's abuser was a man named Peter White, a former neighbour. In 2022, West decided to pursue justice against White, who was now a businessman, having formerly been a plumber. West met with White in his home, whilst wearing a recording wire. White did not deny the abuse, but claimed he could not remember it. He apologised to West and asked for forgiveness. However, West later said that the man was not truly remorseful.

The criminal investigation of White revealed that he had abused other children. Six other victims were willing to testify in court along with West. White, aged 73, was charged with 33 sexual offences. He pleaded guilty and was sentenced to 15 years in prison, with a minimum of nine years to be served before he can be considered for parole.

== Filmography ==
=== Film ===
| Year | Title | Role | Notes |
|---|---|---|---|
| 2005 | You and Your Stupid Mate | Emma | |
| 2007 | The Condemned | Sarah Cavanaugh | |
| 2010 | Matching Jack | Nancy | |
| 2011 | Faces | Rita | Short film |
| 2012 | Save Your Legs! | Janine | |
| 2014 | Predestination | Mrs. Stapleton | |
| 2026 | Deep Water | Martine | |

=== Television ===
| Year | Title | Role | Notes |
|---|---|---|---|
| 2000–2003, 2017, 2019–2020 | Neighbours | Dione "Dee" Bliss | Main cast |
| 2004 | Stingers | Rochelle | Episode: "The River of No Return" |
| 2004 | Big Reef | Casey Lane | TV film |
| 2005 | Hercules | Hippolyta | TV miniseries |
| 2005 | Last Man Standing | Janie | Season 1, Episode 16 |
| 2007–2010 | Satisfaction | Mel | |
| 2007 | The Starter Wife | Katy | |
| 2008 | Canal Road | Bianca/Meredith Pearce/Bianca Pearce | |
| 2008 | Underbelly | Danielle McGuire | |
| 2009 | City Homicide | Melinda Jackson | Episode: "Diggers" |
| 2010 | Rescue Special Ops | Annika Ehrenberg | |
| 2011 | Winners & Losers | Deidre Gross | Episode: "We Are Family" |
| 2012 | Lowdown | Mark Hardy's Wife | Episode: "A Bollywood Ending" |
| 2013 | House Husbands | Dimity | |
| 2013 | Mr & Mrs Murder | Rena | Episode: "Keeping Up Appearances" |
| 2014 | Fat Tony & Co. | Danielle McGuire | |
| 2016–2017 | The Wrong Girl | Erica Jones | Main cast |
| 2018–2019 | Playing for Keeps | Kath Rickards | Main cast |
| 2017–2020 | Neighbours | Andrea Somers | Recurring |

=== Other appearances ===
| Year | Title | Role | Notes |
|---|---|---|---|
| 2024 | Neighbours Does Hard Quiz | Herself | |
| 2018 | Show Me the Movie! | Herself | |
| 2018 | Talkin' 'Bout Your Generation | Herself | |
| 2018 | Have You Been Paying Attention? | Herself | Guest Quiz Master |
