= Alison Whyte =

Australian actress (born 1968)

- Born: 19 December 1968 (age 57); Burnie, Tasmania, Australia
- Education: Victorian College of the Arts
- Occupations: Actress (stage and screen)

Alison Whyte (born 1968) is an Australian actress best known for her roles on the Australian television series Frontline and Satisfaction.

== Acting career ==
A former student of classical ballet, Whyte graduated from the Victorian College of the Arts before rising to prominence on Australian television for her role as the moralising producer Emma Ward on Frontline, the ABC's parody of current affairs programs – a role for which she won the 1997 Silver Logie Award for Most Outstanding Actress. From 2007 to 2010 she played Lauren, the housewife-turned-prostitute on Satisfaction. She won the 2008 Silver Logie Award for Most Outstanding Actress for this role.

Her other television roles have included the legal comedy-drama Marshall Law and Good Guys, Bad Guys. She has also guest starred in an episode of City Homicide. Whyte's film roles include the two-actor film Saturday Night, with Aaron Pedersen, and The Dressmaker directed by Jocelyn Moorhouse.

Whyte appeared on stage in several Shakespeare plays, A Midsummer Night's Dream in several roles over several productions, Twelfth Night as Viola, Much Ado About Nothing as Hero, Macbeth as Lady Macbeth, Hamlet as Gertrude, King Lear as a gender-swapped Gloucester. In 2008, she appeared in a production of David Williamson's play Don's Party at the Sydney Opera House. In 2012, Whyte played Olive in Summer of the Seventeenth Doll in Brisbane and Melbourne.

In 2010, Whyte won Best Female Actor in Supporting Role in a Play at the 10th Annual Helpmann Awards for her portrayal of Queen Elizabeth in Richard III, directed by Simon Phillips. She was also nominated for Best Female Actor in a Play in 2014 for The Bloody Chamber, and in 2017 for Faith Healer.

In 2021, Whyte appeared in the final series of Jack Irish. In 2023, Whyte appeared in Stan series Scrublands.

In 2023/24, Whyte played Linda Loman opposite Anthony LaPaglia's Willy in an Australian production of Arthur Miller's Death of a Salesman in Melbourne and Sydney. In 2026, the production returned to Melbourne and also toured Adelaide and Brisbane. Earlier in 2026, she appeared as Amanda Wingfield in Tennessee Williams' The Glass Menagerie for the Melbourne Theatre Company.

== Other work ==
From 1995 to 2007 Whyte and her husband Fred Whitlock ran the Terminus Hotel in Abbotsford, Melbourne. The couple then went on to own the Yarra Glen Grand Hotel, in the Yarra Valley, before selling it in 2015.

Whyte has visited Vietnam and Cambodia as a spokesperson for Oxfam.

== Awards ==
Association	Award/honour	Year	Work	Results
Logie Awards	Silver Logie for Most Outstanding Actress	1997	Frontline as Emma Ward	Won
Logie Award	Silver Logie for Most Outstanding Actress	2000	Satisfaction	Won
Helpmann Awards	Helpmann Award for Best Female Actor in a Supporting Role in a Play	2010	Richard III as Queen Elizabeth II	Won
Helpmann Awards	Helpmann Award for Best Female Actor in a Play	2014	The Bloody Chamber	Nominated
Helpmann Awards	Helpmann Award for Best Actor in a Play	2017	Faith Healer	Nominated

== Filmography ==
=== Film ===
Year	Title	Role	Notes
2000	Saturday Night	Simone	
2003	Subterano	JD	
2003	Roundabout	Angela Taylor	Short
2007	The Jammed	Mrs. Glassman	
2010	Centre Place	Jo	
2015	The Dressmaker	Marigold Pettyman	
2015	Emily	Emily	Short

=== Television ===
Year	Title	Role	Notes
1990	Bony	Gina	TV series
1990	Neighbours	Amber Martin	8 episodes
1990	Skirts	Natalie	"Sons and Lovers"
1991	Kelly	Cathy Taylor	"The Fire"
1991	Boys from the Bush	Eva	"State and Commonwealth"
1993	All Together Now	Harriet Guest	"Killing Me Softly", "I Am Woman"
1994	Blue Heelers	Janelle Davis	"The First Stone"
1994–97	Frontline	Emma Ward	Main role
1996	The Glynn Nicholas Show	Fifi	Regular role
1996	G.P.	Tracey	"Drowning by Numbers"
1997	Kangaroo Palace	Barbara	TV film
1997	Good Guys Bad Guys: Only the Young Die Good	Stella Kinsella	TV film
1997–98	Good Guys, Bad Guys	Stella Kinsella	Main role
1998	State Coroner	Jessica Geddes	"Body of Evidence"
1998	Driven Crazy	Mrs. Bourke	Main role
1999	SeaChange	Katrina Fennessy	"Vaya Con Dios to All That", "Broken Hearts and Crustaceans", "Sink or Swim"
2000	Introducing Gary Petty	Flight Attendant	"The Flight Attendant Who Did Me Wrong"
2001	Dogwoman: The Legend of Dogwoman	Jacinta Davies	TV film
2002	Marshall Law	Verity Marshall	Main role
2003	CrashBurn	Gillian	"A Red Mexican Warehouse"
2006	Small Claims: The Reunion	Pip	TV film
2006	Real Stories	Vicky Welsh	"1.2"
2007	City Homicide	Petra Milde	"Envelope Day"
2007–10	Satisfaction	Lauren	Main role
2009–10	Tangle	Nicky Barnham	Recurring role
2012	Miss Fisher's Murder Mysteries	Joyce Gaskin	"Death by Miss Adventure"
2015	The Doctor Blake Mysteries	Monika Goodman	"King of the Lake"
2015	Glitch	Lucy Fitzgerald	"Miracle or Punishment", "The Impossible Triangle"
2016	The Kettering Incident	Deb Russell	Main role
2021	Fisk	Ruth	Client with unusual request
2021	Jack Irish	Nina Persky	Series 3, recurring role
2023	Scrublands	Catherine Bond	TV Series "1.1", "1.4"
2026	Gnomes		
