= Diana Glenn =

Australian actress (born 1974)

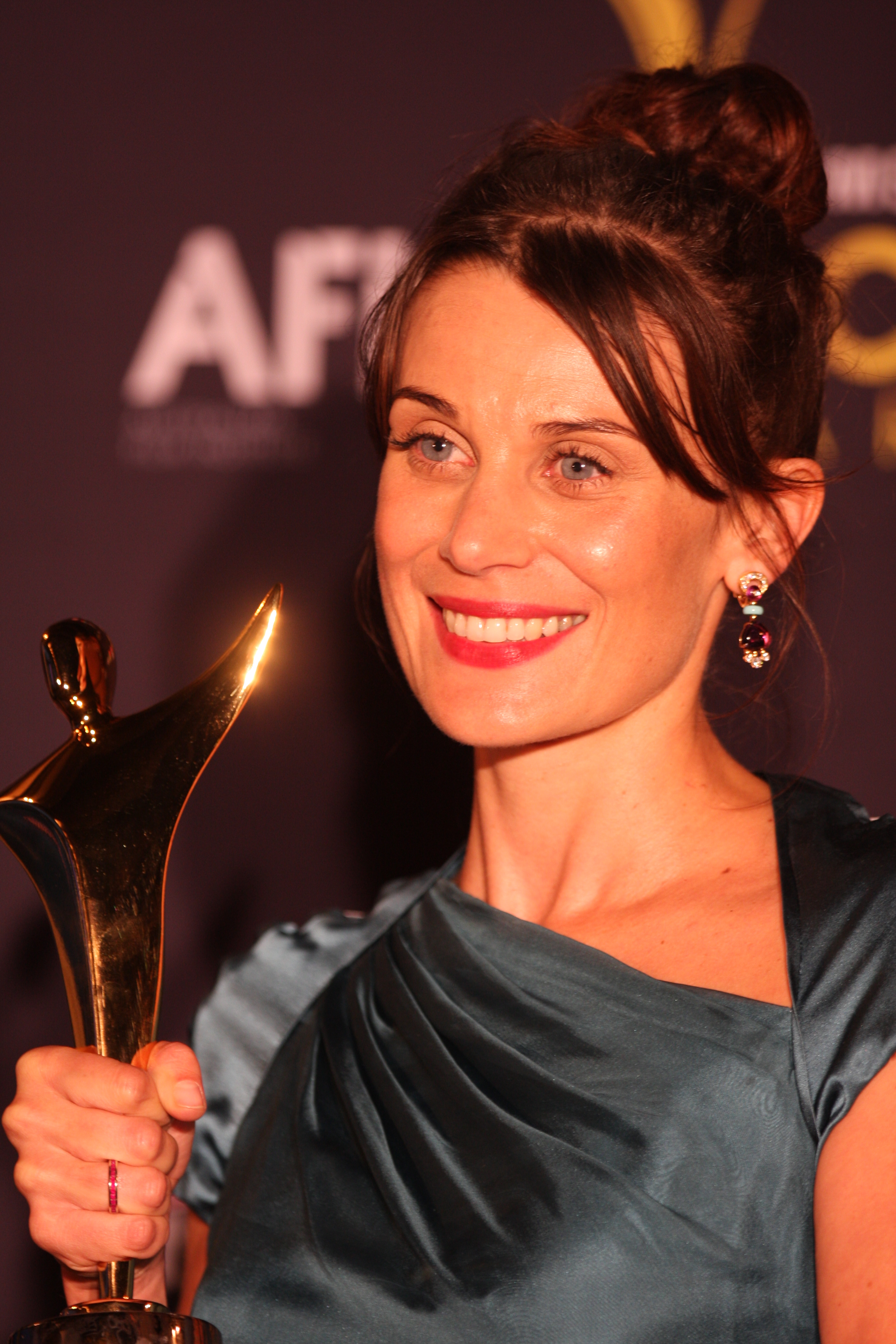
- Glenn with an AACTA Award
- Born: 1974 (age 51–52); Melbourne, Victoria, Australia
- Occupation: Actress
- Years active: 1997–present
- Partner: Vince Colosimo (separated)
- Children: 1

Diana Glenn (born 1974) is an Australian actress with many credits in television, film, and theatre.

== Early life and education ==
Glenn has an English father, Greek mother and three siblings. She attended Melbourne Girls Grammar School and studied arts at Monash University and Melbourne University.

== Career ==
Glenn is best known for her lead/prominent roles in television series including Satisfaction (2007–2009), Canal Road (2008), in the title role of Carla Cametti PD (2009), The Secret Life of Us as Jemima (2005), Neighbours in 1998 as Shannon Jones, Outriders (2001), The Elephant Princess (2008), Home and Away (2010) as Britt Hobart, and The Slap (2011) as Sandi. She has also had significant roles in Secrets and Lies (2013) and Underbelly: Squizzy (2013).

Her movie roles include Oyster Farmer (2004), Somersault (2004), and Black Water (2007).

In 2025, Glenn was named in the cast for VR series Coltrane.

== Personal life ==
Glenn was in a relationship with her Carla Cametti PD co-star Vince Colosimo. In April 2014, Glenn gave birth to their son, Massimo Colosimo. The couple separated two months after the birth of their child in 2014.

In 2024, Glenn studied a Master of Arts Screen: Business at AFTRS.

Glenn has lived in Paris, France, and speaks French.

== Filmography ==
=== Film ===
| Year | Title | Role | Notes |
|---|---|---|---|
| 2003 | Lennie Cahill Shoots Through | Cath | |
| 2004 | Somersault | Sally | |
| 2004 | Oyster Farmer | Pearl | |
| 2006 | The Game | Katie | Short |
| 2006 | Touched by Fellini | Anna | Short |
| 2007 | Crashing | Diana | Segment: "The Trouble with Dick" |
| 2007 | Black Water | Grace | |
| 2008 | Shadow City | Lorraine | Short |
| 2009 | Franswa Sharl | Fran Logan | Short |
| 2010 | The Bridge | Silvie | Short |
| 2011 | Everyman | D'Arcy | Short |
| 2013 | Summer Suit | Mum | Short |
| 2014 | Fall | June Beaumont | Short |
| 2015 | Emily | Caroline | Short |
| 2018 | My Boy Oleg | Masha | Short |
| 2021 | Lone Wolf | Kylie | |

=== Television ===
| Year | Title | Role | Notes |
|---|---|---|---|
| 1997 | State Coroner | Gillian Gardener | "Truth and Circumstances" |
| 1998–99 | Neighbours | Shannon Jones | Recurring role |
| 1999 | Alien Cargo | Leilani Griffin | TV film |
| 2001 | Outriders | Const. Taylor | "Web of Lies: Parts 3 & 4" |
| 2001 | Pizza | Jenny | "Politically Incorrect Pizza" |
| 2002 | White Collar Blue | Corrine Borich | "1.8" |
| 2002–2005 | The Secret Life of Us | Jemima Taylor | Recurring role |
| 2005 | Last Man Standing | Anguk | "1.21" |
| 2007–2009 | Satisfaction | Chloe | Main role (seasons 1–2) |
| 2008 | Canal Road | Olivia Bates | Main role |
| 2009 | Carla Cametti PD | Carla Cametti | Main role |
| 2010 | Home and Away | Britt Hobart | Recurring role |
| 2011 | Killing Time | Denise Fraser | Main role |
| 2011 | The Slap | Sandi | TV miniseries |
| 2012 | Jack Irish: Black Tide | Lyall Cronin | TV film |
| 2013 | Mr & Mrs Murder | Gabi Ellroy | "En Vogue" |
| 2013 | The Elegant Gentleman's Guide to Knife Fighting | Special Guest | "1.2", "1.6" |
| 2013 | Underbelly: Squizzy | Annie Stokes | TV series |
| 2014 | Secrets & Lies | Christy Gundelach | Main role |
| 2014 | Offspring | Kellee | "Winners and Losers" |
| 2015 | Miss Fisher's Murder Mysteries | Mary Maddison / Velma | "Blood & Money" |
| 2016 | The Doctor Blake Mysteries | Valerie Foster | Season 4, episode: "Golden Years" |
| 2017 | True Story with Hamish & Andy | Claudine | "Pilot" |
| 2017 | My Life Is Murder | Imogen Cavanagh | Finale: "Mirror Mirror" |
| 2019 | Reckoning | Tori McGrath | TV series |
| 2021 | Harrow | Mila Zoric | Season 3, 8 episodes |
| 2021 | Ms Fisher's Modern Murder Mysteries | June Montgomery Jones | Season 2, 1 episode |
| 2023 | Bad Behaviour | Caroline Mackenzie | TV miniseries 4 episodes |
| 2023 | In Our Blood | Caroline McGarvey | 1 episode |
| 2026 | Return to Paradise | Linda Halfacre | 1 Episode (1.6 Vote 1 Murder) |
