= Georgia Flood =

Australian actress

- Born: 1992 or 1993 (age 33–34); Phillip Island, Australia
- Occupation: Actress
- Years active: 2007–present
- Relatives: Alexandra Flood (sister); Morris West (granduncle)

Georgia Flood is an Australian film, television and theatre actress. She is known for her roles in Tangle, House Husbands and Wentworth. In 2014, Flood starred in ANZAC Girls as Alice Ross-King for which she received a nomination for Best Actress in a Miniseries at the Golden Nymph Awards.

== Early life and education ==
Georgia Flood was born on Phillip Island, Victoria. The soprano Alexandra Flood is her sister and the author Morris West is her grand-uncle. For six years she attended a school in Dubai. After moving to Melbourne when she was 12 years old, she began attending Methodist Ladies' College, where she graduated in 2010. Flood knew that she wanted to act from an early age. After signing with a talent agency, she appeared in various advertisements. She then studied at the L'École Internationale de Théâtre Jacques Lecoq in Paris and at the 16th Street Actors Studio in Melbourne.

== Career ==
Flood made her stage debut in a production of Blackbird at the Melbourne Theatre Company. She starred in a short film called Hugo, before she was cast in a guest role in police procedural City Homicide. Flood appeared in the Showcase drama Tangle as Charlotte Barker from 2009 until the show's third and final season. In 2011, Flood appeared as Belle in David Williamson's Don Parties On, a sequel to his 1971 play Don's Party. The following year, Flood joined the cast of House Husbands in the recurring role of Phoebe Crabb. Flood and co-star Anna McGahan did not return for the fourth season.

In 2013, Flood successfully auditioned for the role of Debbie Smith in Wentworth, a reimagining of Prisoner. While reviewing the series, Brad Newsome of The Sydney Morning Herald commented, "Flood is always a delight to watch." In the same year, Flood was named as a runner-up for the Heath Ledger Scholarship Award, presented by Australians in Film. Flood stars as Alice Ross-King in the 2014 miniseries ANZAC Girls. At her audition, she was told that she was too young for the part, but she fought for the role. Flood used a copy of Ross-King's diary to help her with the part. She explained, "I carried that diary with me everywhere, and if I was having some trouble in a scene, I'd go back to the diary and there would be a direct paragraph to answer my question." For her portrayal of Ross-King, Flood was nominated for the Golden Nymph Award for Best Actress in a Miniseries.

In 2015, Flood starred in Christine Roger's first feature film I Am Evangeline as lead character Evangeline, a clone who wants to find a cure for her sleeping sickness. Flood also joined the guest cast of Home and Away, and she made an appearance in the comedy series Here Come the Habibs. In 2018, Flood was cast as the lead of Lifetime's American Princess. The series was cancelled after one season. Flood also made a guest appearance on game show Talkin' 'Bout Your Generation. She then starred alongside Ezekiel Simat in the 2021 romantic comedy film Sit. Stay. Love.. Filmed on the Gold Coast in 2020, Flood plays aid-worker Annie, who attempts to reopen the local animal shelter with the help of her former high school enemy.

Flood appeared in the 2022 action film Blacklight, and was cast in the 10-part adventure series Nautilus, which is based on the Jules Verne novel Twenty Thousand Leagues Under the Seas. Flood stars in the 2024 limited series Apples Never Fall as Savannah, alongside Annette Bening and Sam Neill. The series aired on Peacock and was adapted from Liane Moriarty's novel of the same name.

== Filmography ==
=== Film ===
Year	Title	Role	Notes	Ref.
2008	Hugo	Sarah	Short	
2009	The Apocalypse Bear: Beyond the Sea	Josephine	Short	
2014	The Orchard	Anna	Short	
2015	I Am Evangeline	Evangeline		
2021	Sit. Stay. Love.	Annie Blake	Also known as The Dog Days of Christmas	
2022	Blacklight	Pearl		
2025	I Know What You Did Last Summer	Hannah Decker		

=== Television ===
Year	Title	Role	Notes	Ref.
2008	City Homicide	Becky Lewis	Episode: "In House"	
2009–2012	Tangle	Charlotte Barker	Main role	
2012–2014	House Husbands	Phoebe Crabb	Main role (series 1–3)	
2013–2016	Wentworth	Debbie Smith	Recurring role (series 1–2), cameo (series 4)	
2014	ANZAC Girls	Alice Ross-King	TV miniseries Nominated – Golden Nymph Award for Best Actress in a Miniseries	
2016	Home and Away	Lindsay Ford	Guest role	
2016–2017	Here Come the Habibs	Madison O'Neill	Main role	
2018	Olivia Newton-John: Hopelessly Devoted to You	Pat Carroll (young)	Episode: "1.1"	
2018	Talkin' 'Bout Your Generation	Generation Y guest	Episode: "5.7"	
2018	True Story with Hamish & Andy	Natasha	Episode: "Stephen"	
2019	American Princess	Amanda Klein	Main role	
2024	Apples Never Fall	Savannah	Miniseries	
2024	Nautilus	Humility Lucas	Main cast	
