= List of House Husbands episodes =

House Husbands is an Australian television comedy-drama, created by writers Ellie Beaumont and Drew Proffit. It centres on four families where the fathers – Lewis (Gary Sweet), Mark (Rhys Muldoon), Kane (Gyton Grantley) and Justin (Firass Dirani) – are in charge of raising the children. The first ten-part series premiered on the Nine Network on 2 September 2012. The drama set a ratings record for the network and became Australia's most watched television show. On 23 September, it was announced that Nine had renewed House Husbands for a second season. It began airing from 8 April 2013. A third season was broadcast in 2014 and fourth began airing from 10 August 2015.

== Series overview ==
Series	Episodes	Originally released	
Series	Episodes	First released	Last released
1	10	2 September 2012	4 November 2012
2	13	8 April 2013	7 July 2013
3	13	9 June 2014	1 September 2014
4	10	10 August 2015	12 October 2015
5	12	6 February 2017	17 April 2017

== Episodes ==
=== Series 1 (2012) ===
No. overall	No. in season	Title	Directed by	Written by	Original release date	Prod. code	Australian viewers (millions)
1	1	"Episode One"	Geoff Bennett	Ellie Beaumont	2 September 2012	214633-1	1.578
Lewis is a stay-at-home dad to Tilda. Mark is returning to work part-time and looking after his daughter, Poppy. His brother-in-law, Kane, is helping to raise his partner's orphaned niece, Stella, while Justin is a former AFL star who is fighting for custody of his sons and daughter. The beginning of a new school year sees the men join together to help each other out.
2	2	"Episode Two"	Geoff Bennett	Ellie Beaumont and Drew Proffitt	9 September 2012	214633-2	1.408
The parents face Show and Tell day. Justin's wife puts their house on the market, which prompts him to try and prove that he is a good father to their children. Lewis struggles with his new lifestyle, while Mark struggles with work. Kane tries to find a job.
3	3	"Episode Three"	Shirley Barrett	Ellie Beaumont and Drew Proffitt	16 September 2012	214633-3	1.482
Abi and Kane's father comes for a visit and reveals he is broke. Kane starts his new business with help from the other fathers. Lewis thinks about taking on a new renovation project, which upsets Gemma. He later apologises with a proposal. Lewis' daughter, Lucy, helps Justin out with a job and he signs his divorce papers.
4	4	"Episode Four"	Shirley Barrett	Ellie Beaumont	23 September 2012	214633-4	1.382
Kane worries when he learns Stella has been acting like a cat in class, but soon discovers that she has found a kitten. Abi is upset when she misses her daughter's birthday and loses a patient. She later clashes with another mother at the school, Georgina Rivers. Mark gets himself arrested, while trying to prove a point. Justin learns his house has been sold and he asks Lucy out on a date.
5	5	"Episode Five"	Catherine Millar	Michael Miller	30 September 2012	214633-5	1.268
Justin's first date with Lucy goes badly, while Lewis reveals that he is not happy with his friend dating his daughter. Kane coaches the children's soccer team, but has to put it to one side when he learns Stella has a tumour. The men become competitive during the soccer grand final.
6	6	"Episode Six"	Catherine Millar	Christine Bartlett	7 October 2012	214633-6	1.095
Lewis is shocked when his teenage daughter, Phoebe, turns up and reveals she is six months pregnant. Abi's plans for Gemma's hen's night go awry, so she hosts the wedding instead. Mark worries about his job when his boss asks him to help talk to her son about his future. Kane and Tom are surprised at how well Stella has recovered.
7	7	"Episode Seven"	Geoff Bennett	Matt Ford	14 October 2012	214633-7	1.169
Justin tells Lucy that he loves her and asks her to move in with him. When the other guys try to help Justin out, their plan goes askew. Justin later learns how Rodney ended his football career, but Nicola does not believe him. Kane wonders whether he and Tom should foster a child, while Mark becomes jealous of Abi spending time with James.
8	8	"Episode Eight"	Geoff Bennett	Leon Ford	21 October 2012	214633-8	1.113
Lewis is surprised when Gemma mentions having another child. Justin and Nicola panic when Zach goes missing during their custody hearing. The other fathers comfort Justin, after he loses custody of his children. As Mark tries to juggle his work and his home life, he makes a mistake in kissing Miss Nadir.
9	9	"Episode Nine"	Shawn Seet	Christine Bartlett	28 October 2012	214633-9	1.153
Abi finds out about Mark's kiss with Miss Nadir, while he has to face firing his boss. Justin learns that Nicola and Rodney are moving to Sydney. He gets drunk and takes money from the bar, causing problems for Lucy. Lewis and Gemma help Phoebe prepare for the birth of her baby. Tom and Kane face a foster parenting orientation meeting.
10	10	"Episode Ten"	Shawn Seet	Ellie Beaumont	4 November 2012	214633-10	1.238
Justin takes his children camping without telling Nicola, so Rodney calls the police. A head lice infestation breaks out among the children. Kane punches Mark for hurting his sister, while she refuses to come home. The fathers help deliver Phoebe's son, who she names Jem. Kane and Tom reveal that they have been approved for fostering. Abi is given a promotion, before realising she may be pregnant. When Justin learns Nicola did not go to Sydney, Lucy explains that it was because Nicola still loves him.

=== Series 2 (2013) ===
No. overall	No. in season	Title	Directed by	Written by	Original release date	Prod. code	Australian viewers (millions)
11	1	"Episode One"	Geoff Bennett	Ellie Beaumont	8 April 2013	214633-11	1.292
Lewis and Gemma are so worn out that they forget Tilda's birthday, so scramble to organise a party for her. Things get worse when Gemma's mother, Wendy, announces that her husband has left her and the party clashes with another child's. When the fathers go to fetch supplies, they are held up by a gunman. Justin and Nicola look for a new house, but are disheartened when their loan is turned down. However, Lewis finds them a property. After their pregnancy scare, Mark and Abi decide that he should get a vasectomy. But when Abi realises she wants another child, she hurries to stop him.
12	2	"Episode Two"	Geoff Bennett	Fin Edquist	15 April 2013	214633-12	1.196
Desperate to prove his manhood to his wife and friends, Mark creates major problems for Justin's home renovation. Gemma struggles to tell her emotional mother Wendy that her father's affair wasn't a one-off thing. Lewis is forced to admit he really has become good friends with Kane. He sees Tom with another man and decides to act on it. Justin takes extreme measures to earn some quick cash for emergency work on his house.
13	3	"Episode Three"	Catherine Millar	Kirsty Fisher	22 April 2013	214633-13	1.239
Still reeling from her parents' separation, Gemma rekindles her friendship with an old childhood sweetheart. Kane and Tom's relationship faces its biggest challenge yet when Stella's biological father returns and they risk losing their daughter. However he decides to leave Stella with Kane and Tom.
14	4	"Episode Four"	Catherine Millar	Christine Bartlett	29 April 2013	214633-14	1.327
Threatened by Gemma's renewed friendship with Damo, Lewis inadvertently puts Justin and Phoebe off-side. Meanwhile, Mark suggests Abi needs to relax more if she's going to fall pregnant. This works, however she then loses the baby. Phoebe introduces her new boyfriend Ryan to the family while trying to keep it a secret that she is a teenage mum. Her secret however is revealed yet Ryan stays with her.
15	5	"Episode Five"	Ian Barry	Michael Miller	6 May 2013	214633-15	1.299
Kane and Tom's family life is turned upside down when they foster a troubled child Fin. Meanwhile, Abi and Kane face off to raise the most profits for Nepean South. Romance is on the menu at Lucy and Mr Tuck's new apartment and Justin and Nicola celebrate their untimely divorce with a romantic night out.
16	6	"Episode Six"	Ian Barry	Keith Thompson	19 May 2013	214633-16	1.337
Mark is hoodwinked by Justin into employing Nicola as his personal assistant, but her inexperience threatens his career and friendship with Justin. However Nicola is tragically killed whilst looking at a washing machine on the side of the road. Final appearance of Leah de Niese as Nicola Panas
17	7	"Episode Seven"	Grant Brown	Jane Morton	26 May 2013	214633-17	1.196
Justin struggles to deal with everyday life without Nicola. He confronts the driver, who expresses her guilt and apologises to her. Justin's twins suggest a unique ceremony to farewell their mother and Abi makes a life-changing decision to quite her job, at the exact same time Mark quits his job. Meanwhile, preparations are underway for the school disco, and Fin develops a crush on Lucy.
18	8	"Episode Eight"	Grant Brown	Tim Pye	2 June 2013	214633-18	1.084
Lewis' world is rocked when Gemma ends up in a compromising position with her ex-neighbour Damo. Justin needs Lucy to help with the legal issues arising from Nicola's death. Meanwhile, the gang is forced to run the school tuckshop after the manager quits.
19	9	"Episode Nine"	Catherine Millar	Michael Miller	9 June 2013	214633-19	0.956
Justin faces the reality of his new life as a single parent, while Abi takes in Dimity after she splits up with her husband. Meanwhile, Gemma and Lewis have problems in the bedroom and Justin kisses Dimity after the school fundraiser.
20	10	"Episode Ten"	Catherine Millar	Fin Edquist	16 June 2013	214633-20	1.138
Lewis organises a fishing weekend to help Justin rebuild his life. Mark's obsession with work threatens to ruin his health, friendships and marriage. Meanwhile, Lucy and Mr Tuck have the babysitting experience from hell. When the gan returns, Mark decides to cut back his hours, Abi decides to return to work and Justin decides to break up with Dimity. However he is lured back to Dimity.
21	11	"Episode Eleven"	Ian Watson	Keith Thompson	23 June 2013	214633-21	1.143
Kane is tested when he is reunited with his school bully. Things become more complicated for Kane when Finn reveals he wants to be placed with another foster family. Zac and Jacob catch Justin in bed with Dimity. After their kids disapprove, the two break up.
22	12	"Episode Twelve"	Ian Watson	Tim Pye and Kelly Lefever	30 June 2013	214633-22	1.125
Justin's life starts to unravel as he struggles with new crises at home and work. Poker night turns dangerous when Dimitiy's husband learns of her affair with Justin. Abi becomes suspicious of Gemma's sudden secrecy, until Gemma tells her she's part of a book club.
23	13	"Episode Thirteen"	Grant Brown	Ellie Beaumont	7 July 2013	214633-23	1.073
Justin decides to move to Albury after losing thousands of dollars in the poker tournament. However he changes his mind after the kids prep graduation. Mark swallows a magnet. After being arrested and losing her job, Lucy faces the biggest romantic decision of her life to break up with Harry and starts dating Justin. Pregnant Abi develops an unhealthy obsession with school graduation day. Final appearance Tim Campbell as Tom Parker

=== Series 3 (2014) ===
No. overall	No. in season	Title	Directed by	Written by	Original release date	Prod. code	Australian viewers (millions)
24	1	"Episode One"	Grant Brown	Ellie Beaumont	9 June 2014	214633-24	1.086
Lucy moves in with Justin and his children. Mark tries to figure out a way to tell Abi that he hates their daughter's name. During a night out, the husbands get drunk and buy a pub. Gemma is shocked when Lewis reveals that he has spent time in prison for assault. Lewis also tracks down his son Ned.
25	2	"Episode Two"	Grant Brown	Tim Pye	16 June 2014	214633-25	1.097
Gemma invites Ned to dinner to meet the family, while Justin and Lucy suspect he is a con man. Kane reveals that Tom has left him and the children to go to Dubai for work. He tells the other husbands that he cannot buy into the pub, but Lewis helps him out. Lewis' ex-wife, Belle, arrives.
26	3	"Episode Three"	Geoff Bennett	Fin Edquist	22 June 2014	214633-26	0.930
Belle apologises to Lucy for not telling her about Ned. Belle's presence also causes problems for everyone else. The husbands learn that Zac is being bullied by another parent, and take matters into their own hands. Lucy struggles to balance her career and her role as a step-mother to Justin's children.
27	4	"Episode Four"	Geoff Bennett	Ellie Beaumont	29 June 2014	214633-27	1.037
Lewis and Belle search for a new house ends up turning into a trip down memory lane after old feelings are rekindled. Gemma feels betrayed after Belle takes advantage of their friendship.
28	5	"Episode Five"	Ian Watson	Keith Thompson	6 July 2014	214633-28	0.882
A tragedy happens at the hospital leaving Abi reassessing her approach to motherhood. With their pub losing money, the house husbands have to deal with the possibility they could have to sell the place.
29	6	"Episode Six"	Ian Watson	Tim Pye	13 July 2014	214633-29	0.883
Gemma fears the worst when Lewis takes Belle on a trip to find their son. Lewis later has a heart attack when he sleeps with Belle. Kane is torn between loyalty and love, when an old flame offers him work. Mark and Abi are stunned when their daughter is suspended from school.
30	7	"Episode Seven"	Lynn-Maree Danzey	Ellie Beaumont	20 July 2014	214633-30	1.103
As he recovers from his heart attack, Lewis tells Gemma he slept with Belle. Justin takes steps to hide Lewis's secret from Gemma. However Lewis ends up telling Gemma the truth, deveasting her. Belle decides to move back to London. After insulting the school principal, Abi makes a rash decision about Poppy's future. Final appearance of Rachel Griffiths as Belle Crabb
31	8	"Episode Eight"	Lynn-Maree Danzey	Fin Edquist	4 August 2014	214633-31	1.137
Gemma questions every aspect of her life, in the aftermath of Lewis's infidelity. Lewis is determined to earn Gemma's forgiveness, but she still doesn't forgive him.
32	9	"Episode Nine"	Geoff Bennett	Timothy Lee	11 August 2014	214633-32	1.071
Lewis' guilt over his marriage problems threatens to ruin the pub and his friendship with Justin. Kane and Will's romantic first date is hijacked by their kids. Lucy's stress over a job interview endangers Justin's kids. Phoebe and Ryan make a life-changing decision.
33	10	"Episode Ten"	Geoff Bennett	Tim Pye	18 August 2014	214633-33	1.110
Gemma's love for Lewis is rekindled when his heart medication has some unusual side effects. Mark and Abi are seduced by the lavish lifestyle of their wealthy new friends. Justin's world is rocked when Lucy makes a life-changing decision.
34	11	"Episode Eleven"	Karl Zwicky	Fin Edquist	25 August 2014	214633-34	1.106
Gemma and Lewis pretend to be happily married when Gemma's mother comes to stay. Kane is responsible for a major stuff-up at the pub. But Justin suspects a more sinister explanation. Mark gambles his future happiness on a risky business venture.
35	12	"Episode Twelve"	Karl Zwicky	Tim Pye	1 September 2014	214633-35	1.275
Lewis is jealous when Gemma goes on a yoga retreat with her childhood friend, Damo. Kane is heartbroken when Will's true colours are revealed. Ryan proposes to Phoebe, who accepts. They later leave to get eloped because of Gemma and Lewis' separation. The boys go to court to save the pub. When Abi is injured by a violent patient, Mark is forced to change his career plans.
36	13	"Episode Thirteen"	Karl Zwicky	Tim Pye	1 September 2014	214633-36	1.191
Ryan and Phoebe decide not get eloped and have a ceremony instead. Gemma and Lewis get back together after rediscovering the meaning of love at the wedding. Lucy returns and breaks up with Justin. He then sleeps with Frankie, the mother of Ned's child. Kane finds his Mr Right in the most unlikely place – the school library. Final appearance of Georgia Flood, Anna McGahan, Lincoln Lewis as Phoebe Crabb, Lucy Crabb and Ned respectively

=== Series 4 (2015) ===
No. overall	No. in season	Title	Directed by	Written by	Original release date	Prod. code	Australian viewers (millions)
37	1	"Episode One"	Grant Brown	Ellie Beaumont	10 August 2015	214633-37	1.021
It's been a year since we left the House Husbands at the school gate and a lot has changed. Justin is enjoying life as a single dad to his kids Zac, Jacob and little Angie and has started falling for Tash, a young local mum who he has definite chemistry with. There's only one problem; she's in a relationship with Rodney, Justin's ex-football agent and the man who stole his wife. Rodney is coaching a rival netball team and the antagonism between the two men spills out onto the court. Finally, a secret from Justin and Rodney's shared past comes to light which threatens to tear Justin's happy family apart. Kane is horrified when his partner Alex is pressured into becoming a sperm donor and Lewis ruins Mark's last chance to impress his boss. Return appearance of Jane Allsop as Rachel Hilton Note: This was a 90 minute episode.
38	2	"Episode Two"	Grant Brown	Drew Proffitt	17 August 2015	214633-38	0.973
Kane does canteen duty with Eve in order to find out whether she's pregnant with Alex's sperm. As it happens, Eve's not expecting, but after a carrot-chopping incident, the catering rivals bond and Kane, Alex and Eve decide to try for a baby together. Abi is hurt when Kane (under the influence of heavy anaesthetics) asks Lewis and Gemma for a momentous favour in the event of his untimely demise. She reacts by trying to prove she's the world's best sister. Justin is blackmailed over the custody of his daughter.
39	3	"Episode Three"	Mat King	Ellie Beaumont and Drew Proffitt	24 August 2015	214633-39	0.828
When a courier suffers a cardiac arrest at Lewis' house Abi springs into action and saves his life — before realising he is actually NFR (not for resuscitation). The young man threatens to sue Abi, creating a major setback in her competition with Dr Saxon for promotion and threatening to bankrupt her and Mark. Her life becomes further complicated when Kane, Alex and Eve decide Abi is the perfect surrogate to carry their baby — however she accepts their proposal. Justin goes out of his way to help Rodney, with disastrous results and Gemma makes a surprising discovery about Lewis' grandson.
40	4	"Episode Four"	Mat King	Ellie Beaumont	31 August 2015	214633-40	0.918
Abi is primed to be the best surrogate in the world for Kane, but comes into conflict with Mark when he realises he still wants to have another child with her. Their debate is cut short when they receive the startling news that Abi is already pregnant. And their embryo is in danger. Lewis faces a mutiny on the school P&C committee and Justin is heartbroken.
41	5	"Episode Five"	Ian Watson	Drew Proffitt	7 September 2015	214633-41	0.876
Justin and Rodney's legal fight for custody of Angie begins with an Interim Hearing. While the House Husbands are worried for their mate, Justin is confident the status quo will be upheld and he'll maintain full custody. But when Rodney lawyers up and manipulates one of Justin's friends, it leads to a shock ruling that rocks the House Husbands community. Kane develops an unhealthy obsession with Gemma's pregnancy and Mark makes a desperate attempt to get paternity leave.
42	6	"Episode Six"	Ian Watson	Drew Proffitt and Fin Edquist	14 September 2015	214633-42	0.895
Alex is all set to propose to Kane, but the moment is ruined when Finn is punched by a fellow classmate at the breakfast table. Channelling his own childhood trauma, Kane responds by getting into a fight with the bully's father — in the middle of the school library. His behaviour puts Alex's job at risk and causes Alex to question what kind of person he could be marrying. However, with help from Abi and Miss Looby, Kane has a chance of getting their relationship back on track. Lewis has trouble accepting the reality of Gemma's pregnancy and Justin gets a surprising gift from his twins.
43	7	"Episode Seven"	Grant Brown	Matt Ford	21 September 2015	214633-43	0.928
Justin feels as though he's personally being put on trial when a family consultant, Fiona, is appointed by the court to observe him with Angie. After getting off on the wrong foot, Fiona witnesses an unfortunate incident at JB's PBs. Justin's attempt to show emotional maturity ends in disaster when Fiona mistakes Justin's open-ness as flirting. Everything comes to a head at Angie's birthday party when a strung out Justin lets a punch fly — in front of Fiona. Meanwhile, Gemma is hospitalised with pregnancy complications, Abi lies about her pregnancy to impress her boss, and Kane and Alex welcome a surprise new housemate.
44	8	"Episode Eight"	Grant Brown	Ellie Beaumont	28 September 2015	214633-44	0.905
With the custody case looming, the strain is starting to take its toll on Justin. When Judge Kummerow, the judge presiding over Justin's trial, comes into St Michael's Emergency Department, Abi is faced with a dilemma. Ultimately, Abi's decision has devastating consequences, destroying her friendship with Gemma and her chances of winning the promotion. Miss Looby strong-arms Lewis into helping in the classroom.
45	9	"Episode Nine"	Mat King	Ellie Beaumont, Drew Proffitt and Fin Edquist	5 October 2015	214633-45	0.877
Abi returns to the stretch of road where she left Mark after their fight, but he's nowhere to be seen. Desperately worried and still hurt from their argument, she tries to get on with her tree change, but it's not as idyllic as she'd hoped. Meanwhile, Mark accepts a lift from a menacing venison farmer. When he is reunited with Abi, it's clear all is still not well between them, however all this is sorted out. Meanwhile, Lewis is desperate for Gemma to reconcile with her best friend and the house husbands organise a buck's night for Kane with disastrous results. Whilst going to visit Abi and Mark, Eve and Kane crash their car into a tree.
46	10	"Episode Ten"	Matt King	Ellie Beaumont and Drew Proffitt	12 October 2015	214633-46	1.029
Kane and Eve have survived the accident but Eve's leg is badly broken. With no phone reception or any help in sight, things are looking bleak. Then a stunned Abi drives past, on her way to work. At the country hospital, Abi freezes in a moment of self-doubt when she has to perform a potentially life-saving procedure on Eve. In the countdown to Kane's wedding, Lewis and Mark try to match-make a reconciliation between Abi and Gemma. Justin's twins go to extremes to prevent Angie being taken from their family and Gemma starts to have doubts about the surrogate pregnancy. Final appearance of Gyton Grantley, Darren McMullen, Justine Clarke as Kane Albert, Alex Larden and Eve respectively Note: This was a 90 minute episode.

=== Series 5 (2017) ===
No. overall	No. in season	Title	Directed by	Written by	Original release date	Prod. code	Australian viewers (millions)
47	1	"Episode One"	Grant Brown	Trent Roberts	6 February 2017	214633-47	0.777
Lewis becomes suspicious of his new neighbour Nick, who happens to be the new music teacher at Nepean South Primary, and notices that he may be romancing Rachel. Gemma is under pressure after she is accused of cheating during her final medical exam, Mark gets fired from his job and Justin's daughter Angie starts primary school.
48	2	"Episode Two"	Grant Brown	Kirsty Fisher	13 February 2017	214633-48	0.776
A surprise visit from Mark's parents put him on edge, especially when his mother's scrutiny has him defending all his life's decisions. After tragedy strikes, Mark discovers a side to his father that he never knew existed. An offer from Nick could make it possible for Justin to strike out on his own, but could also jeopardise his friendship with Lewis. Gemma's new job at the hospital threatens to wreck her friendship with Abi.
49	3	"Episode Three"	Ian Watson	Ian Meadows	20 February 2017	214633-49	0.758
Justin is surprised by the arrival of his estranged younger brother, Rafiq, who is supposed to be in Nepean South for a family reunion. Recovering from the discovery of his father's life-long secret, grieving Mark has a new dilemma when he loses Bernie's ashes. Desperate to prove he can be a good step-dad, Nick tries some of Lewis's parenting advice.
50	4	"Episode Four"	Ian Watson	Sam Meikle	27 February 2017	214633-50	0.753
Mark finally tracks down his biological father and is inspired to stage a re-introduction for his parents. Justin perseveres with helping his brother, but when Rafiq receives some crushing news, his volatile behaviour puts one of Justin's children in serious danger. Lewis's distrust of Nick thaws when he sees the potential in Nicks' new music business.
51	5	"Episode Five"	Fiona Banks	Matt Ford	6 March 2017	214633-51	0.691
Nick is caught between his new life and his dark past after an old associate tracks him down and demands he repay a debt. The 'Nepean South Parents Have Got Talent' competition threatens to create more discord than harmony between the House Husbands. Lewis struggles to cope with Gemma's career success.
52	6	"Episode Six"	Fiona Banks	Josh Mapleston	13 March 2017	214633-52	0.720
Gemma captures the attention of a visiting surgeon, but after rejecting his advances, she becomes the victim of a bullying campaign. Nick does his best to clear the air with the other House Husbands, but tries their patience when he reveals he still hasn't come clean to Rachel about his secret gambling past. After offending his friends and family, Lewis tries to take a more relaxed approach to life.
53	7	"Episode Seven"	Grant Brown	Trent Roberts	20 March 2017	214633-53	0.801
An unfortunate accident involving a rare rabbit sets off a chain of bad luck for Nick. When schoolyard rumors result in a petition calling for his sacking, he decides to quit while he's ahead. Abi delivers a disastrous impromptu Human Development class, which goes from bad to worse when Atticus reveals his mother's secret. Rachel relies on Abi and Gemma to deal with her pregnancy.
54	8	"Episode Eight"	Grant Brown	Ian Meadows	27 March 2017	214633-54	0.776
A radio competition gives Justin the chance to take his kids on their first real holiday. When Rafiq appears in the ED, covered in gold-paint and at an all-time low, Gemma and Abi step in to help. Justin's friends endeavor to keep him in the dark, fearing he'll forfeit his trip to support his brother.
55	9	"Episode Nine"	Ian Watson	Fin Equist	3 April 2017	214633-55	0.794
Izzy Dreyfus, a motorcycle riding, free-spirit arrives at Neapean South as the new school literacy specialist and her arrival turns more than a few heads. Rafiq's future is clouded with uncertainty after he collapses during a training session and Justin endures an agonizing wait to discover whether his boys have inherited the same condition. Lewis faces a major challenge as candidate for local council.
56	10	"Episode Ten"	Ian Watson	Sam Carroll	3 April 2017	214633-56	0.584
Nick finds himself hot and bothered after Izzy admits an attraction to him. The situation becomes particularly sticky when Rachel befriends Izzy and nominates Nick to help her out with her ex. Lewis' campaign for councilor hits a rocky patch when he realizes he's failing to connect with female constituents. The house husbands devise the perfect heist to retrieve Izzy's stolen motorbike. With his AFL career in tatters, Justin's kids help Rafiq find a new goal in life.
57	11	"Episode Eleven"	Sian Davies	Trent Roberts and Jo Martino	10 April 2017	214633-57	0.661
The votes are in and Lewis is elected to council. However, he's barely taken his oath before he's floored by shocking news. At the end of the year, Nepean South Primary will be shut down. Gemma is accepted into the coveted San Diego Orthopedic program, but considers deferring because of Lewis' new position.
58	12	"Episode Twelve"	Sian Davies	Matt Ford and Meaghan Rodriguez	17 April 2017	214633-58	0.563
Life as a counselor is making Lewis feel like public enemy number one. Eager to stop the school closure and convinced the facts behind it don't add up, Lewis goes looking for answers. Mark and Abi experience every parent's worst nightmare as they wait to see the extent of their daughter's injuries after Poppy falls while protesting the school's closure.

== Ratings ==
House Husbands : AUS viewers per episode (millions)

Season	Episode number												
Season	1	2	3	4	5	6	7	8	9	10	11	12	13
1	1.578	1.408	1.482	1.382	1.268	1.095	1.169	1.113	1.153	1.238	–		
2	1.292	1.196	1.239	1.327	1.299	1.337	1.196	1.084	0.956	1.138	1.143	1.125	1.073
3	1.086	1.097	0.930	1.037	0.882	0.883	1.103	1.137	1.071	1.110	1.106	1.275	1.191
4	1.021	0.973	0.828	0.918	0.876	0.895	0.928	0.905	0.877	1.029	–		
5	0.777	0.776	0.758	0.753	0.691	0.720	0.801	0.776	0.794	0.584	0.661	0.563	–

Source: Audience measurement performed by OzTam
