= List of Talkin' 'Bout Your Generation episodes =

Talkin' 'Bout Your Generation is an Australian game show produced by Granada Productions which premiered on Network Ten on 5 May 2009. It is hosted by Shaun Micallef.

Series 1 ran for a total of 18 episodes, with the original production order extended due to the success of the show. A second series of 26 episodes began airing from 7 February 2010. Series 2 went on a planned hiatus as of Episode 10 on 18 April 2010. It returned with new episodes from 1 August 2010 and concluded with a Christmas special on 23 November 2010. Talkin' 'Bout Your Generation returned to its original timeslot of 7:30 pm Tuesday from 7 September 2010. A third series began on 8 February 2011 before concluding on 18 September 2011. The fourth series began on 1 February 2012 before concluding on 29 March 2012. A fifth series has been announced by the Nine Network to premiere 21 May 2018. A sixth series was premiered on 1 May 2019.

== Series overview ==
Series	Episodes	Originally released		
Series	Episodes	First released	Last released	Network
1	18	5 May 2009	22 November 2009	Network Ten
2	26	7 February 2010	28 November 2010	Network Ten
3	18	8 February 2011	18 September 2011	Network Ten
4	10	1 February 2012	29 March 2012	Network Ten
5	8	21 May 2018	9 July 2018	Nine Network
6	8	1 May 2019	26 June 2019	Nine Network
7	8	16 September 2025	4 November 2025	Network 10

== Episodes ==
=== Season 1 (2009) ===
The first series of Talkin' 'Bout Your Generation began airing on Network Ten on 5 May 2009. It ran for 18 episodes concluding with a Christmas special on 22 November 2009.

No.	End Game	Baby Boomers guest	Generation X guest	Generation Y guest	Original release date	Prize
1	"Wallpapering"	George Negus	Arj Barker	Ruby Rose	5 May 2009	Shaun's ARIA Award
2	"Making a Sand Castle"	Peter Rowsthorn	Dylan Lewis	Patience Hodgson	12 May 2009	Shaun's Thank God You're Here trophy
3	"Building a Dog House"	Ian "Dicko" Dickson	Stephen Curry	Rebel Wilson	19 May 2009	A book of science fiction stories given to Shaun
4	"Mowing the Lawn"	Ian Smith	Lawrence Leung	Maeve Higgins	26 May 2009	Shaun's Silver Logie Award
5	"Setting a Table"	Kirk Pengilly	Kat Stewart	Rhys Uhlich	2 June 2009	Shaun's 1978 Runners Up Athletics Trophy
6	"Reverse Parallel Parking"	Marcia Hines	Matt Welsh	Dave Thornton	9 June 2009	Shaun's "World's Best Lover" Mug
7	"Making a Champagne Fountain"	Benita Collings	Kram	Alyssa Sutherland	16 June 2009	A Congressional Medal of Honor
8	"Making Shaun's Breakfast"	Greedy Smith	Sophie Lee	Matt Lee	22 June 2009	The 1957 Nobel Prize in Chemistry
9	"Decorating a Birthday Cake"	Jonathan Coleman	Tim Rogers	Gracie Otto	30 June 2009	Shaun's son's soccer trophy
10	"Painting Shaun's Portrait"	Henry Roth	Rove McManus	Cassie Davis	7 July 2009	A Kentucky Derby Trophy
11	"Building a tower of Blocks"	Tony Martin	Kate Langbroek	Margot Robbie	14 July 2009	1972 Miss Southern California title
12	"Making a fine wine by squashing grapes with feet"	Denise Scott	Samuel Johnson	Faustina Agolley	21 July 2009	The Talkin' 'Bout Your Generation trophy^{[a]}
13	"Pitching a tent"	Gretel Killeen	Carey Hart	Andy Lee	28 July 2009	The Talkin' 'Bout Your Generation trophy
14	"Getting ready for work"	Noeline Brown	Angus Sampson	Nikki Webster	4 August 2009	The Talkin' 'Bout Your Generation trophy
15	"Milking a cow"	Denise Drysdale	Claudia Karvan	Hamish Blake	11 August 2009	The Talkin' 'Bout Your Generation trophy
16	"Packing a car for a holiday"	Jimmy Barnes	Chris Brown	Hayley Pearson	18 August 2009	The Talkin' 'Bout Your Generation trophy
17	"Building a snowman"	Kerri-Anne Kennerley	Wil Anderson	Josh Lawson	1 September 2009	The Talkin' 'Bout Your Generation trophy and a cheque for $7.50
18	"Decorating a Christmas tree"	Denise Scott	Dylan Lewis	Ruby Rose	22 November 2009^{[c]}	No prize

Notes

a. From episode 12 onwards a small trophy with a plaque saying "Winner: Trivia Competition" replaced the different prizes that were awarded in each episode. A new trophy parodying the Raising the Flag on Iwo Jima was used starting from the first episode of the second season.

b. The season finale featured the contestants and the host dressed up in costume as people related to their generation era. Shaun dressed as Robert Smith, Amanda as Marilyn Monroe, Kerri-Anne as Krystle Carrington, Charlie as Marty McFly, Wil as "Doc" Emmett Brown, Josh Thomas as Gerard Way and Josh Lawson as Harry Potter.

c. This episode was a Christmas Special, with Christmas-themed questions. An extended version was aired on Christmas Eve, 24 December 2009.

==== Viewership ====
Ep	Original airdate	Australian Viewers	Night Rank	Source
1	5 May 2009	1,648,000	#1	
2	12 May 2009	1,599,000	#2	
3	19 May 2009	1,613,000	#2	
4	26 May 2009	1,648,000	#1	
5	2 June 2009	1,625,000	#2	
6	9 June 2009	1,655,000	#2	
7	16 June 2009	1,703,000	#1	
8	22 June 2009	1,754,000	#1	
9	30 June 2009	1,594,000	#3	
10	7 July 2009	1,659,000	#3	
11	14 July 2009	1,495,000	#6	
12	21 July 2009	1,580,000	#2	
13	28 July 2009	1,616,000	#2	
14	4 August 2009	1,513,000	#3	
15	11 August 2009	1,479,000	#2	
16	18 August 2009	1,503,000	#3	
17	1 September 2009	1,554,000	#3	
18	22 November 2009	1,060,000	#11	

=== Season 2 (2010) ===
The second series consists of 26 episodes and began airing on 7 February 2010 on Network Ten in Australia. The series was split into two blocks, both airing in 2010. The first ten episodes were broadcast until 18 April, and the second block consisting of a further 16 episodes aired from 1 August to 23 November. Additionally, a highlights special, dubbed Family Assortment, aired on 4 April 2010.

No.	End Game	Baby Boomers guest	Generation X guest	Generation Y guest	Original release date	Viewers	Rank
1	"Setting a broken bone"	Basil Brush	Joe Hockey	Jolene Anderson	7 February 2010	1,323,000	5^{[a]}
2	"String Art"	John Wood	Natalie Bassingthwaighte	Darren McMullen	14 February 2010	1,066,000	10
3	"Washing a Dog"	Red Symons	Kate Ritchie	Sammy J	21 February 2010	1,091,000	8
4	"Making a Scarecrow"	Peter Rowsthorn	Ronan Keating	Stephanie Gilmore	28 February 2010	1,180,000	6
5	"Setting Up a Spare Room"	Brian Mannix	Marieke Hardy	Guy Sebastian	7 March 2010	1,203,000	7
6	"Upholstering furniture"	Georgie Parker	Julian Morrow	Matthew Mitcham	14 March 2010	1,212,000	7
7	"Building a fence"	Graeme Blundell	David Campbell	Natalie Hunter	21 March 2010	1,102,000	8
8	"Working in an office"	Chrissy Amphlett	Tim Minchin	Brooke Satchwell	28 March 2010	1,193,000	4
*	TBA	TBA	TBA	TBA	4 April 2010	806,000	7
A highlights episode dubbed 'family assortment' was aired in the show's normal timeslot. It featured clips from past episodes.
9	"Changing a Tyre"	Colin Hay	Poh Ling Yeow	Hamish Blake	11 April 2010	1,106,000	11
10	"Renovating a Laundry"	Patti Newton	Lisa McCune	Scott Dooley	18 April 2010	1,236,000	7
11	"Finding their way through a maze"	William McInnes	Jimeoin	Ricki-Lee Coulter	1 August 2010	1,328,000	5
12	"Working on a conveyor belt"	Bill Bailey	Rodger Corser	Ella Hooper	8 August 2010	1,188,000	6
13	"Making lemonade"	Liam Oliver^{(Amanda's Son)}	Pamela Pickering^{(Charlie's Mum)}	Drew Thomas^{(Josh's Brother)}	15 August 2010	1,438,000	3
14	"Moving Houses"	Alex Perry	Frank Woodley	Gin Wigmore	22 August 2010	1,226,000	7
15	"Pottery"	Jeff Green	Megan Gale	Jason Smith	29 August 2010	1,168,000	7
16	"Doing a school project (Erupting a volcano)"	Steve Vizard	Kate Langbroek	Andy Lee	5 September 2010	1,250,000	6
17	"Being a Hairdresser"	Denise Scott	Bob Franklin	Lincoln Lewis	7 September 2010	1,210,000	7
18	"Cleaning up after a party"	Jean Kittson	Todd Sampson	Faustina Agolley	14 September 2010	1,365,000	3
19	"Going to market"	Mark Trevorrow	Clare Bowditch	Josh Lawson	21 September 2010	1,243,000	4
20	"Delivering Newspapers"	Leo Sayer	Kimberley Davies	Scott McGregor	28 September 2010	999,000	9
21	"Being a Butcher"	Merv Hughes	Deborah Mailman	Maude Garrett	19 October 2010	1,008,000	10^{[b]}
22	"Fruit & Vegetable Bobbing"	Kathy Lette	Angus Sampson	Camille Keenan	26 October 2010	1,242,000	4^{[c]}
23	"Getting home in the dark"	HG Nelson	Chrissie Swan	Tim Blackwell	2 November 2010	1,258,000	7
24	"Body Art"	Glynn Nicholas	Claudia Karvan	Rai Thistlethwayte	9 November 2010	1,230,000	4
25	"Landscaping"	Michael Veitch	Eddie Perfect	Lucy McIntosh	16 November 2010	1,175,000	5
26	"Being the embodiment of Christmas"	Jennifer Byrne	Chas Licciardello	Hamish Blake	23 November 2010	1,450,000	1^{[d]}

Notes

a. The series 2 premiere featured a special 3D segment requiring anaglyphic glasses. Ten made the glasses available in copies of Woman's Day and TV Week magazines in the lead up to the broadcast.

b. Returning after a two-week break for the 2010 Commonwealth Games.

c. A Halloween themed special.

d. A Christmas themed special.

=== Season 3 (2011) ===
On 14 September 2010, Network Ten confirmed Talkin' 'Bout Your Generation would return in 2011. On 25 January 2011, it was announced that Series 3 would begin airing on 8 February 2011. Similar to series 2, this series was split into two airing blocks with a hiatus in the middle.

No.	End Game	Baby Boomers guest	Generation X guest	Generation Y guest	Original release date	Viewers	Rank
1	"Blowing up a machine gun nest"	Kevin Harrington	Julia Zemiro	Leisel Jones	8 February 2011	831,000	13
2	"Polishing shoes"	Ita Buttrose	Robyn Butler	Rob Mills	15 February 2011	850,000	11
3	"Dressing a shop window"	Judith McGrath	Todd Woodbridge	Danny Clayton	22 February 2011	812,000	10
4	"Balling socks (in pairs)"	Penny Cook	Kris Smith	Mike Posner	1 March 2011	839,000	12
5	"Filling a car with ping-pong balls"	Harley Oliver^{(Amanda's husband)}	Suzie Pickering^{(Charlie's sister)}	Mona Hale (Note: Shaun declared Mona (not including Josh) as the sole winner of this episode.)^{(Josh's grandma)}	8 March 2011	1,067,000	5
6	"Assembling a skeleton"	John Waters	Arj Barker	Laura Dundovic	15 March 2011	905,000	10
7	"Running a Fish & Chip Shop"	Noni Hazlehurst	Rebecca De Unamuno	Matt Lee	22 March 2011	946,000	11
8	"Completing a covert "Black Ops" mission"	Jeff Stilson	Andrew Gaze	Brooke McClymont	29 March 2011	965,000	8
9	"Carving an ice sculpture"	Bill Hunter	George Calombaris	Celia Pacquola	5 April 2011	1,049,000	6
10	"Winning"	John Blackman	Kate Langbroek	Sophie Monk	12 April 2011	1,076,000	7 (Note: This episode was the last episode before its planned mid-series hiatus. It was a Wizard of Oz themed special.)
11	"Raising a barn Amish-style"	Todd McKenney	Dave Hughes	Kate Miller-Heidke	10 August 2011	801,000	12
12	"Cleaning out a fish tank"	Jay Laga'aia	Jane Allsop	Gyton Grantley	17 August 2011	889,000	12 (Note: This episode was a Law & Order-themed special.)
13	"Working at an ice cream parlor."	Simon Burke	Wayne Hope	Paris Wells	24 August 2011	793,000	11
14	"Sewing a three-piece suit."	Tiriel Mora	Genevieve Morris	Patience Hodgson	31 August 2011	757,000	11
15	"Laundering a bed sheet"	Cornelia Frances	Jimeoin	Natalie Tran	4 September 2011	791,000	11 (Note: This episode was a Time Warp themed special. Amanda hosted the show with Charlie representing the Baby Boomers, Josh representing Generation X and Shaun representing Generation Y, each dressed up as the other.)
16	"Preparing for a military inspection"	Francis Greenslade	Robyn Butler	Katie 'Monty' Diamond	7 September 2011	754,000	12
17	"Fixing a space shuttle"	Peter Berner	Darren Hayes	Maude Garrett	11 September 2011	825,000	12 (Note: This episode was a Sci-Fi themed special)
18	"Sculpting a bust (of Max Walker)"	Lorraine Bayly	Craig McLachlan	Jay Ryan	18 September 2011	855,000	11

=== Season 4 (2012) ===
On 27 October 2011, Network Ten confirmed Talkin' 'Bout Your Generation would return in 2012 for a fourth series. On 22 January 2012, it was announced that the show would begin airing on 1 February 2012 in an 8pm timeslot.

No. overall	No. in season	End Game	Baby Boomers guest	Generation X guest	Generation Y guest	Original release date	Viewers
63	1	"Gluing together a smashed vase"	Mary Coustas	Stephen K. Amos	Jodi Gordon	1 February 2012	678,000
64	2 (Note: Young Talent Time special)	"Preparing high tea"	Johnny Young	Tina Arena	Rob Mills	8 February 2012	758,000
65	3 (Note: Shakespeare special)	"Typing out the complete works of Shakespeare"	HG Nelson	Claudia Karvan	Josh Lawson	15 February 2012	593,000
66	4	"Panel van art"	Barry Crocker	Chris Cheney	Felicity Ward	22 February 2012	627,000
67	5	"Catching yabbies"	Peter Rowsthorn	Myf Warhurst	Timomatic	29 February 2012	633,000
68	6	"Giant origami"	Rachel Berger	Craig Lowndes	Caitlin Stasey	7 March 2012	664,000
69	7	"Finding a needle in a hay stack"	Matt Preston	Kate Langbroek	Josh Earl	14 March 2012	609,000
70	8	"Preparing a horse for dressage"	Maggie Kirkpatrick	Dave O'Neil	Ella Hooper	21 March 2012	<495,000
71	9 (Note: Gone with the Wind-themed episode; this episode was originally intended to be the series finale)	"Building a grand staircase"	Deborah Hutton	Matt Lucas	Christie Whelan	28 March 2012	820,000
72	10	"Shoveling ectoplasm into a toilet"	Carl Cox	Bob Franklin	Veronica Milsom	29 March 2012	583,000

=== Season 5 (2018) ===
The fifth series premiered on Nine Network on Monday, 21 May 2018 at 7:30pm. It is the first time that the show has aired on another network, following its cancellation from Network Ten in 2012.

In May 2017, it was rumoured the show may be revived on an unknown network but without the former host and panellists. In September 2017, it was confirmed the series would be returning, switching from Network Ten to the Nine Network, with Shaun Micallef to again host the series. Tickets for the audience became available at the end of September 2017 with filming for the series to take place between 7 and 29 October at Docklands Studios Melbourne. In October 2017, the series was officially confirmed for revival set to air in 2018, as well as the announcement of the series captains. Generation X will be led by Robyn Butler, Generation Y will be led by Andy Lee and Generation Z will be led by Laurence Boxhall.

The team captains for the 2018 series are Robyn Butler (Generation X), Andy Lee (Generation Y) and Laurence Boxhall (Generation Z).

No. overall	No. in season	End Game	Generation X guest	Generation Y guest	Generation Z guest	Original release date	Viewers
73	1	"Washing a tractor"	Eddie Perfect	Kate McLennan	Brenna Harding	21 May 2018	720,000
74	2	"Running a hipster cafe"	Dave Hughes	Madeleine West	Jayden Hunt	28 May 2018	637,000
75	3	"Erecting a statue"	Sonia Kruger	Hamish Blake	Molly Daniels	4 June 2018	720,000
76	4	"Building a tower of jelly"	Wayne Hope^{(Robyn's husband)}	Alex Miles^{(Andy's sister)}	Eve Boxhall^{(Laurence's mother)}	11 June 2018	653,000
77	5	"Artistic fruit and vegetable arrangement"	Helen Dallimore	Nick Cody	Bernadina Van Tiel	18 June 2018	623,000
78	6	"Building a nest"	Claudia Karvan	Rhys Nicholson	Liv Hewson	25 June 2018	621,000
79	7	"Building a billy cart"	Sam Simmons	Georgia Flood	Morgan Baker	2 July 2018	543,000
80	8	"Going Back to the Future (Note: High school-themed special)"	Tim Rogers	Kate Jenkinson	Aaron Chen	9 July 2018	444,000

=== Season 6 (2019) ===
In October 2018, The series was renewed for a sixth season at Nine's upfronts with Micallef returning as host and Lee, Butler & Boxhall returning as series captains. The series premiered on 1 May 2019.

No. overall	No. in season	End Game	Generation X guest	Generation Y guest	Generation Z guest	Original release date	Viewers
81	1	"Running a nuclear power plant"	Christian O'Connell	The Veronicas	Angourie Rice	1 May 2019	676,000
82	2	"Being a caveman"	Arj Barker	Sophie Monk	Tayla Harris	8 May 2019	663,000
83	3	"Cooking during a blackout"	Michala Banas	Brendan Fevola	Ciaran Lyons	15 May 2019	560,000
84	4	"Doing household chores in the 1960s"	Red Symons	Tina Bursill	Peter Rowsthorn	22 May 2019	560,000
85	5	"Escaping from a high-security prison"	Jimeoin	Joel Creasey	Tayla Damir	29 May 2019	528,000
86	6	"Restoring the roof of the Sistine Chapel"	Georgie Carroll	Miranda Tapsell	Liam Stapleton	12 June 2019	503,000
87	7	"Making an omelette without cracking a few eggs"	Justine Clarke	Luke McGregor	Alli Simpson	19 June 2019	508,000
88	8	"Making a wedding cake (Note: Kings & Queens special)"	Stephen K. Amos	Jess Harris	Aaron Chen	26 June 2019	505,000

=== Season 7 (2025) ===
Another revival of the series, with a return to Network 10, was confirmed on 16 September 2024 at Paramount's 2025 upfronts. Anne Edmonds was later announced as the new host, alongside new team captains Dave Hughes (Generation X), Tommy Little (Generation Y) and Anisa Nandaula (Generation Z).

This season was the first to do away with the traditional End Game challenge.

No. overall	No. in season	Generation X guest	Generation Y guest	Generation Z guest	Original release date	Viewers
89	1	Todd McKenney	Carrie Bickmore	Will Gibb	16 September 2025	461,000
90	2	Rove McManus	Miranda Tapsell	Callum Hole	23 September 2025	384,000
91	3	Julia Morris	Nath Valvo	Tyrone Pryor	30 September 2025	313,000
92	4	Matt Lucas	Abbie Chatfield	Blake Pavey	7 October 2025	322,000
93	5	Kate Langbroek	Lloyd Langford	Sarah 'Sez' O'Neill	14 October 2025	303,000
94	6	Geraldine Hickey	Sam Taunton	Con Coutis	21 October 2025	332,000
95	7	Shane Jacobson	Concetta Caristo	Cody Simpson	28 October 2025	294,000
96	8	Lisa McCune	Luke McGregor	Kath Ebb	4 November 2025	304,000
