= Spencer McLaren =

Australian theatre and television actor

- Born: 28 February 1973 (age 53); Sydney, Australia
- Education: National Institute of Dramatic Art (NIDA)
- Occupations: Actor, producer
- Known for: The Secret Life of Us
- Spouse: Chris Wright (m. 15 February 2014)

Spencer McLaren (born 28 February 1973, Sydney) is an Australian theatre and television actor, best known for his role as Richie Blake on Australian television drama The Secret Life of Us.

== Early life ==
McLaren was born in Sydney, one of two sons to a British mother and Australian father, but spent his first five years in Birmingham in the UK, after which time the family moved back to the western suburbs of Sydney.

McLaren's parents divorced when he was eleven, and around the age of 14, he moved to Melbourne, where he attended Werribee Tech and then Blackburn South High School. As a student, he played a lead role in the musical South Pacific. A visit to the US in 1990, as an exchange student saw him join a Glee-style school choir and perform in state competitions.

On his return to Australia, inspired to pursue a performing career, McLaren starred dance training and appeared in amateur musicals, including Show Boat for Nova Music Theatre and Oklahoma! with Whitehorse Musical Theatre.

After working for five years in musical theatre, in professional productions of Cats, Kismet, Aladdin, West Side Story and Beauty and the Beast, McLaren was accepted to study at the National Institute of Dramatic Art (NIDA), from which he graduated in 1999.

While at NIDA, McLaren performed in student productions of Don's Party, Julius Caesar, A Chaste Maid in Cheapside, Glengarry Glen Ross, 12 Angry Men, Cloud 9 and The Libertine. While undertaking his studies, he launched The Looking Glass Theatre Company, with a production of Sunday in the Park, in which he gave a critically acclaimed performance as Georges Seurat.

== Career ==
=== Television and film ===
In 2000, after graduating from NIDA, McLaren was offered a six-week guest role in long-running soap opera Home and Away as Kieran Fletcher, a love interest for Sally Fletcher, played by Kate Ritchie.

McLaren then landed the part for which he is best known – his starring role as Richie Blake on Australian award-winning television drama, The Secret Life of Us. He landed the role when actor Paul Leyden, who was originally cast, was offered a three-year contract on American soap As the World Turns and had to pull out. McLaren played Richie for 66 episodes during the show's first 3 seasons from 2001 to 2003. The series found success with audiences both in Australia and overseas in the UK, Ireland, Canada, NZ, France, Norway, South Africa, Russia and the Netherlands.

In 2003, McLaren relocated to London, with actor Hugh Jackman having directed him towards an agent. He landed a recurring role on British soap opera Family Affairs as gay backpacker Brett Owen in 2005. The same year, he voiced the character of Bronik on the Doctor Who audio adventure Scaredy Cat. He also toured in UK theatre productions, but ultimately decided to return to Australia after about four years.

McLaren also made guest appearances in soap opera Chances, police procedural series Blue Heelers, medical drama All Saints, McLeod's Daughters, American fantasy series The Lost World and miniseries The Damnation of Harvey McHugh.

McLaren played the titular role in 2011 short film Brad in a Bottle. In 2016, he appeared in a TV miniseries adaptation of John Marsden's Tomorrow When The War Began, playing the role of Daniel Maxwell. The series saw him reunited with his former Secret Life costars Deborah Mailman and Sibylla Budd.

In 2023, McLaren featured alongside Justine Clarke in 10-part ABC drama series, Turn Up the Volume. Inspired by the coming-of-age documentary No Time For Quiet. The following year, he had a recurring role in Paramount+ drama thriller miniseries Fake, starring Asher Keddie and David Wenham.

McLaren is set to appear in upcoming Netflix film You, Always, opposite Adrian Grenier and Jessica De Gouw.

=== Theatre ===
McLaren has appeared in numerous theatre productions. Early credits in professional theatre included Kismet, Cats and West Side Story. From 1995 to 1996, he played the role of the Beast in Beauty and the Beast and understudied Hugh Jackman's Gaston in the same production.

While working on The Secret Life of Us, McLaren used the five-month break in production each year to work in theatre, including Call Me Madam at the Melbourne's State Theatre, and a three-month run of Footloose, playing the lead role of Ren McCormack. After leaving Secret Life, he played the lead role of rock star Conrad Birdie in the musical comedy production Bye Bye Birdie.

McLaren has also toured extensively throughout the US, with performances at the cabaret clubs Eighty Eights in New York City and Manhattan's famous Rainbow Room.

=== Producing ===
In 2011, McLaren produced the film Surviving Georgia, starring Pia Miranda and Holly Valance. Unable to find distributors to take on the film, he set up his own production company, McLaren House, which has included theatre productions, TV series and both short and feature films.

McLaren produced children's series Dive Club for 10 Shake & Netflix, which was shot during the COVID pandemic in 2020. During this period, he also produced a number of films, including Swimming for Gold (2020), Sit. Stay. Love. (2021), Kidnapped (2021), Love in Bloom (2021), Romance on the Menu (2021), You, Me and the Penguins (2021), and This Little Love of Mine (2021).

McLaren was executive producer on LGBT romance film Ellie & Abbie (& Ellie's Dead Aunt) (2020), supernatural drama film Sweet River (2020) and The Art of Incarceration (2021).

In 2022, McLaren produced thriller The Infernal Machine, starring Guy Pearce, which was sold to Paramount Worldwide and the upcoming romantic drama Everything I Never Did, directed by Jeremy Sims.

McLaren's stage production credits include Strange Bedfellows (2010) at Sydney's Regent Theatre, a regional tour of Hoges: One Night Only! (2014), a stage adaptation of Mother and Son (2014–2015) and a Melbourne production of Midnight – The Cinderella Musical (2023).

=== Podcast ===
In July 2025, McLaren began hosting a podcast, called McLaren Versus, featuring personal interviews with well-known Australian performers. The second season premiered in January 2026, and reunited the cast of The Secret Life of Us for the 25-year anniversary of the show.

== Filmography ==
=== Film ===
==== As actor ====
Year	Title	Role	Type
2008	Out of Order	Jack Superstar	Short film
2010	A Love Story	Bartman	Short film
2011	Surviving Georgia	James	Feature film
2011	Brad in a Bottle	Brad	Short film
2013	Cliffy	Race Official	TV movie
2017	Ali's Wedding	Tony	Feature film
2020	Swimming for Gold	Announcer	Feature film

==== As producer ====
Year	Title	Role	Type
2008	Out of Order	Producer	Short film
2011	Surviving Georgia	Producer	Feature film
2016	Spirit of the Game	Producer	Feature film
2017	Riptide	Line Producer	Feature film
2019	Fragmentary	Executive Producer	Film
2020	Ellie & Abbie (& Ellie's Dead Aunt)	Executive Producer	Feature film
2020	Swimming for Gold	Producer	Feature film
2020	Romance on the Menu	Producer	Feature film
2020	Sweet River	Executive Producer	Feature film
2021	Kidnapped	Producer	Feature film
2021	The Greenhouse	Executive Producer	Feature film
2021	This Little Love of Mine	Producer	Feature film
2021	Sit. Stay. Love.	Producer	Feature film
2021	The Art of Incarceration	Executive Producer	Feature film
2022	Love and Penguins	Producer	Feature film
2022	Love in Bloom	Producer	Feature film
2022	The Infernal Machine	Producer	Feature film
2026	Cruel Hands	Co-producer	Completed
2026	The Room Below	Production accountant	In production
TBA	Everything I Never Did	Producer	In development

=== Television ===
==== As actor ====
Year	Title	Role	Type
1992	Chances	Glenn Patterson	1 episode
1994	Halfway Across the Galaxy and Turn Left	Law Enforcer	2 episodes
1994	The Damnation of Harvey McHugh	Young Matildan	Miniseries, 2 episodes
2000	Home and Away	Kieran Fletcher	7 episodes
2000	The Lost World	Qinaq's Mate	1 episode
2001–2003	The Secret Life of Us	Richie Andrew Blake	Seasons 1–3, episodes 1–66
2002	Andrew Lloyd Webber: Masterpiece	Self	TV special
2005	Family Affairs	Brett Owen	29 episodes
2006	Green Wing	Jonny	1 episode
2006	Blue Heelers	Gary Harding	1 episode
2007	McLeod's Daughters	Sam Nugent	1 episode
2008	City Homicide	Kevin Stockton	1 episode
2008	All Saints	Evan	1 episode
2016	Tomorrow When The War Began	Daniel Maxwell	Miniseries, 6 episodes
2021	Dive Club	Hotel Pool Attendant	1 episode
2023	Turn Up The Volume	Dad	3 episodes
2024	Fake	Tovey	Miniseries

==== As producer ====
Year	Title	Role	Type
2021	Dive Club	Producer	12 episodes
2022	La Brea	Unit Production Manager / Assistant Unit Production Manager Attachment	4 episodes
2025	Ceebs	Production accountant	Miniseries

== Podcasts ==
Year	Title	Role	Type	Ref.
2005	Doctor Who: The Monthly Adventures	Bronik	Podcast series, 1 episode: "Scaredy Cat"	
2025–	McLaren Versus	Host	Podcast series	

== Theatre ==
=== As actor ===
Year	Title	Role	Type	Ref.
	Show Boat		Nova Music Theatre	
1991	Chess	Chorus	National Theatre, Melbourne with Festival Theatre Company	
1992	Oklahoma!	Dancer	Deakin University, Melbourne with Whitehorse Musical Theatre	
1994	Kismet in Concert	First Beggar / Bangleman	Victorian Arts Centre with VSO	
1994	Cats	Munkustrap	Her Majesty's Theatre, Sydney with Really Useful Productions	
1995	West Side Story	Mouthpiece / Tony (understudy)	Capitol Theatre, Sydney with Victorian State Opera	
	Aladdin			
1995–1996	Beauty and the Beast	Ensemble / alternate Beast	Princess Theatre, Melbourne with Michael Edgley International	
1997	Don's Party	Mal	NIDA Theatre, Sydney	
	Glengarry Glen Ross		NIDA Theatre, Sydney	
	Making Noise Quietly	Oliver Bell	NIDA, Sydney	
1998	Being Friends	Oliver	NIDA Theatre, Sydney	
1998	A Cry from the City of Virgins		UNSW Parade Theatre, Sydney	
1998	Julius Caesar	Brutus	NIDA Studio, Sydney	
1998	A Chaste Maid in Cheapside (or Carry On Chaste Maid)	Uncle Touchwood / Servant	NIDA Studio, Sydney	
1999	Twelve Angry Men	Juror # 4	UNSW Parade Theatre, Sydney	
1999	Cloud Nine	Joshua / Edward	UNSW Parade Theatre, Sydney	
1999	The Libertine	Etherege / Huysmans	UNSW Parade Theatre, Sydney	
	Sunday in the Park with George	Georges Seurat	The Looking Glass Theatre Company	
2000	Call Me Madam	Kenneth Gibson	State Theatre, Melbourne, Arts Centre Melbourne with The Production Company	
2001	Masterpiece – The Music of Andrew Lloyd Webber		Shanghai / Beijing tour	
2002	Carousel	Billy Bigelow	Royal Festival Hall, London	
2003	Footloose	Ren McCormack	Capitol Theatre, Sydney with SEL & The Gordon Frost Organisation	
2003	Songs for a New World	Singer	Dunstan Playhouse, Adelaide for Adelaide Cabaret Festival	
	Spencer McLaren Live at the Chapel	Solo show	Chapel Off Chapel, Melbourne	
2003–2004	Bye Bye Birdie	Conrad Birdie	State Theatre, Melbourne with The Production Company	
2004	The Vegemite Tales	Dan	Old Red Lion, London with Algernon Productions	
2004–2005	Snow White and the Seven Dwarfs	Prince	Sheffield Lyceum, Yorkshire	
2007	Life's a Circus		Chapel Off Chapel, Melbourne	
2007	Fully Committed	Solo show / various characters	Melbourne Athenaeum for Melbourne Fringe Festival	
2008	Broadway Concert: Musical Melodies in the Park	Singer	Ardrie Park, Melbourne	
2012	8 – The Play		Her Majesty's Theatre, Melbourne, Sydney Town Hall	
2012	Secret Bridesmaids' Business	Guest groom	Arts Centre Melbourne with Kay & McLean Productions	
2014	Standing on Ceremony: The Gay Marriage Plays		Chapel Off Chapel, Melbourne for Midsumma Festival	

=== As producer / director ===
Year	Title	Role	Type	Ref.
	Sunday in the Park with George	Director	The Looking Glass Theatre Company	
2007	Fully Committed	Producer	Melbourne Athenaeum for Melbourne Fringe Festival	
2010	Strange Bedfellows	Producer	Regent Theatre, Sydney	
2014	Hoges: One Night Only!	Producer	Australian regional tour	
2014–2015	Mother and Son	Producer	Comedy Theatre, Melbourne, Playhouse, Brisbane	
2023	Midnight – The Cinderella Musical	Producer	Comedy Theatre, Melbourne	

== Awards and nominations ==
Year	Work	Awards	Category	Result	Ref.
2021	Dive Club	AACTA Awards	Best children's program	Nominated	

== Personal life ==
McLaren is gay. He married his partner of five years, Chris Wright in a commitment ceremony on 15 February 2014 at St Kilda Botanical Gardens, Melbourne.
