= Sit. Stay. Love. =

- Directed by: Tori Garrett
- Written by: Holly Hester
- Produced by: Kelly Son Hing; Spencer McLaren; Steve Jaggi
- Starring: Georgia Flood; Ezekiel Simat
- Cinematography: HB Gibson
- Edited by: Charlotte Cutting
- Music by: Craig McConnell
- Production companies: The Steve Jaggi Company; MarVista Entertainment
- Distributed by: Athabasca Film
- Release date: 2 December 2021
- Running time: 90 minutes
- Country: Australia
- Language: English

Sit. Stay. Love. is a 2021 Australian Christmas romantic comedy television film, directed by Tori Garrett, written by Holly Hester and starring Georgia Flood, Ezekiel Simat, Anthony Phelan, Anna McGahan, Christine Amor and Kaushik Das. The film was shot during COVID-19 pandemic. The film was released in Australia theatrically on December 2, 2021. Lifetime acquired the film's United States distribution rights, and then aired it on the Lifetime channel on November 11, 2022 under the new title The Dog Days of Christmas.

== Cast ==
- Georgia Flood as Annie Blake
- Ezekiel Simat as Dylan Hawkes
- Anthony Phelan as Dan Blake
- Christine Amor as Aunt Claire
- Kaushik Das as Gary
- Charlotte Stent as Iris
- Anna McGahan as Remy
- Leon Cain as William
- Ling Cooper Tang as Stacy
- Mansoor Noor as Phil

== Plot ==
Aid worker Annie Blake (Georgia Flood) teams with her old school nemesis Dylan (Ezekiel Simat) to save the local animal shelter and find homes for the animals.
