= Runcorn State High School =

State secondary school in Queensland, Australia

Location
- 132 Hill Road; Runcorn; Queensland, 4113; Australia; 27°35′32.48″S 153°4′38.09″E

Information
- Type: state, secondary, co-ed
- Motto: Pride Success Excellence
- Established: 1986
- Enrolment: 843 (2023)
- Website: runcornshs.eq.edu.au

Runcorn State High School is a public, co-educational, high school, located in the Brisbane suburb of Runcorn, in Queensland, Australia. It is administered by the Department of Education, with an enrolment of 843 students and a teaching staff of 94, as of 2023. The school serves students from Year 7 to Year 12.

== History ==
The school opened on 28 January 1986.

In 2015, a Muslim student was promptly sent home after wearing an Islamic garb on a free dress day, leading to a complaint being filed with the state anti-discrimination commissioner.

== Curriculum ==
Compulsory subjects; through all year levels include Maths and English. In the junior school, students must also study SOSE, Science, Physical Education and a language. Students have other options such as drama, media, art or business.

== Sporting houses ==
There are four sporting Houses, Selsey (Yellow), Tarsett (Green), Nathan (Red) and Sirett (Black).

== Notable alumni ==
- Cameron Bairstow, Australian former professional basketball player
- Kasey Edwards, Australian author and columnist
- Nick Vujicic, Australian-American Christian evangelist and motivational speaker
- Anisa Nandaula, Australian comedian
- Matthew Bell, former NRL player
