= Turn Up the Volume =

Australian television series

- Genre: Teen drama
- Starring: Riya Mandrawa; Ayiana Ncube; Mira Russo; Elaine King; Erza James
- Composer: Amelia Barden
- Country of origin: Australia
- Original language: English
- No. of seasons: 1
- No. of episodes: 10

Production
- Executive producers: Amanda Higgs; Margaret Ross
- Producers: Philippa Campay; Rachel Davis
- Production companies: Matchbox Pictures; Film Camp

Original release
- Network: ABC Me
- Release: 24 March 2023

Turn Up the Volume is a ten-part Australian teen drama television series on ABC ME that first aired in March 2023.

== Synopsis ==
The series follows a group of young female and gender-diverse teenagers who start a band called "The Volume" at a music camp held in Melbourne's inner west suburbs. It is inspired by the coming-of-age documentary No Time For Quiet, which followed the first Girls Rock! Camp in Melbourne.

== Cast ==
=== Main ===
- Riya Mandrawa as Vivi
- Erza James as Hex
- Elaine King as Ginger
- Mira Russo as Breeze
- Ayiana Ncube as Jam

=== Supporting ===
- Teo Vergara as Quinn
- Ben Chen as Leo
- Kaiya Jones as Stevie
- Michala Banas as Mish
- Yuka Iwasaki as Jules
- Keith Brockett as David
- Faro Musodza as Iris
- Jennifer Dao as Mrs Nguyen
- Spencer McLaren as Dad
- Paul Blenheim as J-Dad
- Madison Lu as Matilda
- Kevin Harrington as Cam
- India Bailey as Claudia
- Justine Clarke as Sandy
- Tim Rogers as Terry
- Debra Lawrence
- Dennis Coard

== Production ==
Turn Up the Volume comprises ten episodes. It was written by Dannika Horvat, Penelope Chai, Matthew Bon, Ciarán Hanrahan, Chloe Wong, Betiel Beyin, and Leigh Lule. It was directed by Tenika Smith, Jub Clerc, Harry Lloyd, Jessie Oldfield, and Adam Murfet.

Music performed by The Volume is composed and produced by Josh Teicher and Sophia Exiner.

The show was produced by Philippa Campey and Rachel Davis and production companies Matchbox Pictures and Film Camp.

It had major investment from Screen Australia and the ABC, and additional finance from VicScreen.

== Broadcast ==
Turn Up the Volume premiered on ABC Me and ABC iview on 24 March 2023.

== Accolades ==
Turn Up the Volume was nominated for the 2023 Logie Award for Most Outstanding Children's Program.

== See also ==
- List of Australian television series
