= Kasey Edwards =

Australian writer (born 1976)

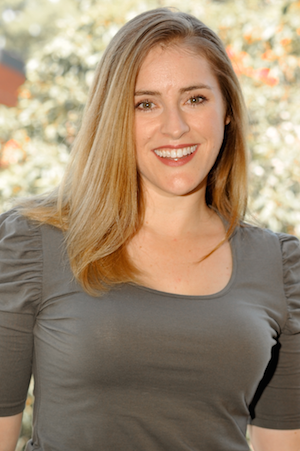
- Edwards in 2011
- Born: 20 March 1976 (age 50); Melbourne
- Occupations: Book author and columnist
- Notable work: Thirty-Something and Over It and Thirty-Something and the Clock is Ticking
- Website: kaseyedwards.com

Kasey Edwards is an Australian feminist author and columnist.

== Early life and education ==
Edwards attended Runcorn High School in Brisbane, Australia, where she was school captain. Edwards started her career in business working for the Australian Trade Commission and on Business Club Australia, the official business programs for the Sydney 2000 Olympics. She was made redundant on the same day her first book was published.

Her brother is composer and pianist Michael Edwards.

== Writing career ==
Edward's books include 30-Something and Over It: What Happens when you Wake Up and Don't Want to go to Work. Ever Again. and 30-Something and the Clock Is Ticking: What Happens When You Can No Longer Ignore the Baby Question, both published by Mainstream, an imprint of Random House (UK). Her books have been republished by Random House in Australia, and translated by publishers in Germany, Finland, the Netherlands and Portugal. She also wrote a book about positive body image which was critical of the diet industry, titled Kill The Fat Girl, but she was unable to find a commercial publisher to buy it.

30-Something and Over It is a memoir documenting Edwards' dissatisfaction with work and career. In it, she explores the idea of a 'thrisis' — a thirty-something crisis. Edwards told Body & Soul that a thrisis is 'looking forward and being terrified of spending the next 30 years in a state of unfulfilled monotony'.

Edwards writes a column for the Australian feminist website Daily Life, published by Fairfax. A collection of Edwards' articles for Daily Life was published in 2017 under the title Guilt Trip published by Nero books, an imprint of Schwartz Publishing. She is also a contributor to The Sydney Morning Herald, The Guardian and Brisbane Times.

Edwards has also written two books of satire: OMG! That's Not My Child... He's Sharing and OMG! That's Not My Husband... both published by Prion Books, an imprint of Carlton Publishing Group. The books spoof the picture book series 'That's Not My...' published by Usborne. OMG! That's Not My Husband..., written in 2011, went viral in 2016 after a critical review written by an American man on Father's Day.

== Personal life ==
Aged 32, Edwards was diagnosed as having polyendocrine metabolic ovarian syndrome (PMOS) in one ovary and endometriosis in the other and advised to conceive within the next year if she planned to have children. Her daughter Violet was born in 2009, conceived by IVF with her husband Chris.

== Works ==
- Edwards, Kasey (2 April 2009). Thirty-Something and Over It: What Happens When You Wake Up and Don't Want to Go to Work . . . Ever Again. Mainstream Publishing. ISBN 978-1-84596-446-7.
- Edwards, Kasey (7 April 2011). 30-Something and the Clock Is Ticking: What Happens When You Can No Longer Ignore the Baby Issue. Mainstream Publishing. ISBN 978-1-84596-993-6.
- Edwards, Kasey (16 October 2011). OMG! That's Not My Husband... He's changing a nappy. Prion. ISBN 978-1-85375-815-7.
- Edwards, Kasey (2011). OMG! That's Not My Child... He's sharing. Prion. ISBN 978-1-85375-814-0.
- Edwards, Kasey (1 May 2017). Guilt Trip: My Quest to Leave the Baggage Behind. Nero. ISBN 978-1-86395-929-2.
