= Alexandra Flood =

Australian operatic soprano (born 1990)

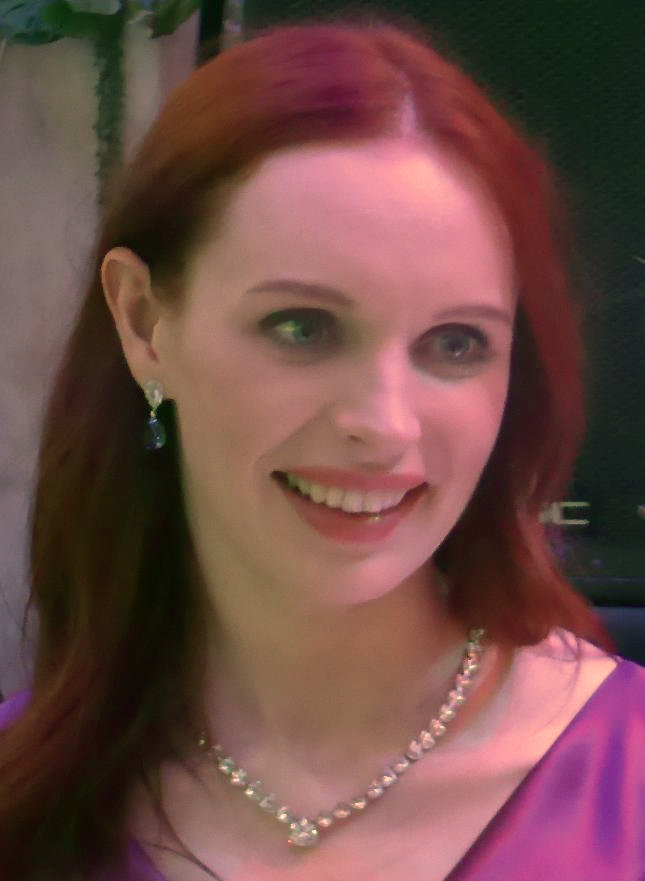
- Flood in 2016
- Born: 26 February 1990 (age 36); Cowes, Victoria, Australia
- Occupation: Soprano
- Relatives: Georgia Flood (sister); Morris West (granduncle)

Alexandra Flood (born 26 February 1990) is an Australian operatic soprano.

== Career ==
Born in Cowes, Victoria, Flood attended the Methodist Ladies' College, Melbourne and studied from 2007 until 2010 at the University of Melbourne (B.A., Diploma in Music). In 2011, she gained a Graduate Diploma of Journalism at the Royal Melbourne Institute of Technology. She then continued from 2014 to 2016 at the Hochschule für Musik und Theater München (Master's degree in Music Theatre).

In 2014 she was awarded a Mike Walsh Fellowship.

Flood was part of the 2014 Salzburg Festival's Young Singers Project and made her European stage debut there as Blonde in a production for children of Mozart's Die Entführung aus dem Serail and as Modistin in Richard Strauss's Der Rosenkavalier. Her first leading role was Marguerite in May 2015 in Le petit Faust by Hervé at the Staatstheater am Gärtnerplatz, Munich. This was followed in October by the title role in Janáček's The Cunning Little Vixen for Pacific Opera, Sydney.

In 2016, Flood became a Studio Artist at the Wolf Trap Opera Festival. She sang Violetta in Traviata Remixed at the Grachtenfestival in Amsterdam. She sang Serpetta in Mozart's La finta giardiniera in September at the Niedersächsische Musiktage in Hanover, Germany. Her first appearance in Poland was as Norina opposite Mariusz Kwiecień in Donizetti's Don Pasquale at Opera Krakowska in 2017, a role she reprised in 2018 at the Vorarlberger Landestheater, Austria. 2018 saw her Australian stage debut as Tell's son, Jemmy, in Rossini's William Tell for Victorian Opera, Melbourne. Flood is a principal soloist at the Vienna Volksoper since 2022.

On the concert stage, Flood sang in Carl Orff's Carmina Burana, Vivaldi's "Gloria", Saint-Saëns' Oratorio de Noël, Handel's Messiah, Haydn's The Seasons, and Vaughan Williams' A Pastoral Symphony. She sang the Edna in Jonathan Dove's church opera Tobias and the Angel with the Munich Radio Orchestra under the baton of Ulf Schirmer.

Flood has won grants and awards in Australia, Austria, and Germany. The actress Georgia Flood is her sister, the author Morris West her grand-uncle. She married opera baritone Alexander York in September 2024.

In June 2023, Flood announced the launch of her inaugural Queensland Art Song Festival in Brisbane, Australia.
