= Pacific Opera =

Australian opera training company

Pacific Opera is an opera training company based in Sydney, Australia.

Founded in 2003 by Sylvie Renaud-Calmel and Christine Douglas OAM, the first artistic director, the company has an annual Young Artist Program for emerging opera singers aged 18 to 35, which integrates coaching, rehearsals and stage craft with numerous public and private performance opportunities. Annual opera productions offer role practice to the young artists and employment for young industry professionals including designers, orchestral musicians, repetiteurs, conductors and directors.

Simon Kenway was artistic director from 2015 to 2019, followed by co-directors Peter Coleman-Wright AO and Cheryl Barker AO. Coleman-Wright introduced the staging of "pocket operas" in 2021, works reduced to about an hour and tailored to young singers.

== Productions ==
- 2003: The Magic Flute, The Independent Theatre, North Sydney
- 2004: Hansel and Gretel, The Independent Theatre, North Sydney
- 2005: Così fan tutte, The Independent Theatre, North Sydney, and Riverside Theatres, Parramatta
- 2006: Pacific Opera in Concert 2006, The Independent Theatre, North Sydney
- 2007: The Barber of Seville; Pacific Opera in Concert 2007 The Independent Theatre, North Sydney, and Riverside Theatres, Parramatta
- 2008: Offenbach's Daphnis and Chloe (Australian premiere) and Gorgeous Galatea, The Independent Theatre, North Sydney
- 2009: La sonnambula, Glen Street Theatre, Belrose
- 2010: Hänsel und Gretel. Glen Street Theatre, Belrose
- 2011: The Magic Flute, Llewelynn Hall Canberra with the Canberra Symphony Orchestra, Glen Street Theatre, Belrose, and Riverside Theatres, Parramatta
- 2012: "Opera at the Forum", The Italian Cultural Forum, Leichhardt
- 2013: The Marriage of Figaro, Riverside Theatres, Parramatta, and Young Town Hall, Young
- 2014: The Gondoliers Dream Getaway, Riverside Theatres, Parramatta
- 2015: The Cunning Little Vixen with Alexandra Flood, New Hall, Sydney Grammar School, Sydney
- March 2021: The Marriage of Figaro, pocket opera with Willoughby Symphony Orchestra, Concert Hall, The Concourse, Chatswood
- June 2021: Fidelio and Der Rosenkavalier double bill pocket operas
- June 2021: The Rape of Lucretia, pocket opera
- 2022: The Magic Flute, pocket opera
- May 2022: Suor Angelica, pocket opera
- May 2022: Albert Herring, pocket opera
- October 2022: Evening of Oratorio, excerpts from Handel's L'Allegro, il Penseroso ed il Moderato, Purcell's Dido and Aeneas (full)
- November 2022: L'elisir d'amore, followed by Madama Butterfly, pocket operas
- June 2023: Don Giovanni, pocket opera
- July 2023: Paul Carr's Requiem for an Angel (Australian premiere) and Ubi Caritas
- August 2023: The Barber of Seville, pocket opera
- May 2024: Discovering Die Fledermaus, prepared and directed by Gale Edwards
- August 2024: The Impresario and Le nozze di Figaro
- May 2025: Samson (abridged) with The Muffat Collective (instrumentalists)
- June 2025: The Magic Flute, pocket opera
- August 2025: Opera Scenes, from La bohème and La clemenza di Tito
