= American Princess (2019 TV series) =

- Genre: Comedy drama
- Created by: Jamie Denbo
- Written by: Jamie Denbo
- Starring: Georgia Flood; Lucas Neff; Seana Kofoed; Rory O’Malley; Mary Hollis Inboden
- Composers: Gwendolyn Sanford; Brandon Jay; Daniel Brummel
- Country of origin: United States
- Original language: English
- No. of seasons: 1
- No. of episodes: 10

Production
- Executive producers: Jamie Denbo; Tara Herrmann; Jenji Kohan; Mark A. Burley
- Production location: Los Angeles, California
- Running time: 42 minutes
- Production companies: A+E Studios; Tilted Productions; Global Road Television Entertainment

Original release
- Network: Lifetime
- Release: June 2 – July 7, 2019

American Princess is an American comedy-drama television series created by Jamie Denbo that premiered on June 2, 2019, on Lifetime. Denbo wrote for the series and executive produced alongside Jenji Kohan and Tara Herrmann. On August 29, 2019, Lifetime canceled the series after one season.

== Premise ==
American Princess follows "Amanda, an Upper East Side socialite, who runs off to join a Renaissance Fair after her wedding goes awry. Amanda’s storybook wedding plans are dramatically derailed when she discovers her fiancé is cheating on her, just hours before they are to be wed. Outraged, Amanda reacts violently to the indiscretions and runs away from her own dream wedding in the countryside, only to find herself stranded in the middle of a Renaissance Faire with no phone and no way home. She soon discovers her outburst has made tabloid headlines and experiences a nervous breakdown, leading her to re-evaluate her life. The unexpected awakening leads Amanda to leave everything she thought she cared about behind, to become the Faire’s newest wench-in-waiting."

== Cast and characters ==
=== Main ===
- Georgia Flood as Amanda Klein
- Lucas Neff as David
- Seana Kofoed as Maggie
- Rory O’Malley as Brian
- Mary Hollis Inboden as Delilah

=== Recurring ===
- Lesley Ann Warren as Joanntha
- Max Ehrich as Brett
- Mimi Gianopulos as Morgan
- Helen Madelyn Kim as Lexi
- Tommy Dorfman as Nick
- Taylor Gray as Jose
- Erin Pineda as Helen
- Matt Peters as Shart O’Belly
- Lucas Hazlett as Stick
- Lex King as Callie
- Steve Agee as Lee
- Kitana Turnbull as Breeze
- Mike Lane as Bo
- Juan Alfonso as Juan Andres, aka "Faire Bear"
- Sophie von Haselberg as Natasha
- Sas Goldberg as Erin Klein-Fagel
- Patrick Gallagher as Friar Woodruff
- Tyler Ghyzel as 'Lil Boy'

== Episodes ==
No.	Title	Directed by	Written by	Original release date	U.S. viewers (millions)
1	"Pilot"	Claire Scanlon	Jamie Denbo	June 2, 2019	0.372
2	"Just Boob Stuff"	Mark A. Burley	Jon Sherman	June 2, 2019	0.220
3	"Down There"	Nick Sandow	Dana Min Goodman & Julia Wolov	June 9, 2019	0.240
4	"Why Are You Romeo?"	Jude Weng	Kathleen Jordan	June 16, 2019	0.234
5	"Man Stuff"	Mark A. Burley	Joel Stein	June 23, 2019	0.235
6	"Queen, Interrupted"	Claire Scanlon	Robert Sudduth	June 23, 2019	0.104
7	"The Tempest"	Michael McDonald	Rheeqrheeq Chainey & Sarah Stoecker	June 30, 2019	0.248
8	"Fairemily Matters"	Bill Purple	Robert Sudduth	June 30, 2019	0.102
9	"You Can Always Trust Your Vaganya"	Ryan Case	Jon Sherman	July 7, 2019	0.170
10	"Faire Well"	Claire Scanlon	Jamie Denbo	July 7, 2019	0.124

== Production ==
=== Development ===
On August 10, 2017, it was announced that Lifetime had given a series order to American Princess, a new television series created and written by Jamie Denbo. The series order was reportedly for a first season of ten episodes in which Denbo will also executive produce alongside Jenji Kohan and Tara Herrmann. Production companies involved in the series include A+E Studios and IM Global Television. On April 26, 2018, it was reported that Claire Scanlon would direct for the series. On June 29, 2018, it was clarified that she would be directing the pilot episode and the season finale. On February 6, 2019, it was announced that the series would premiere on June 2, 2019.

=== Casting ===
On April 24, 2018, it was announced that Georgia Flood, Lucas Neff, Seana Kofoed, Rory O’Malley, and Mary Hollis Inboden had joined the main cast as series regulars. On May 24, 2018, it was reported that Lesley Ann Warren and Max Ehrich had been cast in recurring roles. In July 2018, it was reported that Mimi Gianopulos, Helen Madelyn Kim, Tommy Dorfman, Erin Pineda, Matt Peters, Lucas Hazlett, Lex King, Steve Agee, Kitana Turnbull, Mike Lane, Juan Alfonso, Sophie Von Haselberg, Sas Goldberg, and Patrick Gallagher would appear in a recurring capacity.

=== Filming ===
Principal photography for the first season began on July 6, 2018 in Los Angeles, California.

== Release ==
On February 9, 2019, the first trailer for the series was released.

== Reception ==
=== Critical response ===
On the review aggregator website Rotten Tomatoes, the series has an approval rating of 71% based on 7 reviews, with an average rating of 6.81/10.

=== Ratings ===
Viewership and ratings per episode of American Princess
No.	Title	Air date	Rating (18–49)	Viewers (millions)	DVR (18–49)	DVR viewers (millions)	Total (18–49)	Total viewers (millions)
1	"Pilot"	June 2, 2019	0.09	0.372	—N/a	—N/a	—N/a	—N/a
2	"Just Boob Stuff"	June 2, 2019	0.06	0.220	—N/a	—N/a	—N/a	—N/a
3	"Down There"	June 9, 2019	0.06	0.240	0.02	0.057	0.08	0.297
4	"Why Are You Romeo?"	June 16, 2019	0.06	0.234	0.02	0.040	0.08	0.274
5	"Man Stuff"	June 23, 2019	0.05	0.235	0.01	0.041	0.06	0.276
6	"Queen, Interrupted"	June 23, 2019	0.03	0.104	—N/a	—N/a	—N/a	—N/a
7	"The Tempest"	June 30, 2019	0.05	0.248	TBD	TBD	TBD	TBD
8	"Fairemily Matters"	June 30, 2019	0.02	0.102	TBD	TBD	TBD	TBD
9	"You Can Always Trust Your Vaganya"	July 7, 2019	0.04	0.170	TBD	TBD	TBD	TBD
10	"Faire Well"	July 7, 2019	0.02	0.124	TBD	TBD	TBD	TBD
