= House Husbands =

Television series

- House Husbands title card
- Genre: Comedy-Drama
- Created by: Ellie Beaumont; Drew Proffitt
- Directed by: Geoff Bennett; Shirley Barrett; Catherine Millar; Shawn Seet
- Starring: Firass Dirani; Gyton Grantley; Rhys Muldoon; Gary Sweet; Anna McGahan; Julia Morris; Natalie Saleeba; Tim Campbell; Georgia Flood; Leah de Niese; Lincoln Lewis; Rachel Griffiths; Darren McMullen; Jane Allsop; Justine Clarke; Hugh Sheridan; Delta Goodrem
- Country of origin: Australia
- Original language: English
- No. of series: 5
- No. of episodes: 58 (list of episodes)

Production
- Executive producers: Jo Rooney; Andy Ryan; David Taylor; David Maher
- Producers: Sue Seeary; Drew Proffitt
- Production location: Melbourne
- Running time: 60 minutes
- Production company: Playmaker Media

Original release
- Network: Nine Network
- Release: 2 September 2012 – 17 April 2017

House Husbands is an Australian television comedy drama. The show debuted on the Nine Network on 2 September 2012. Set in Melbourne, House Husbands stars Firass Dirani, Gyton Grantley, Rhys Muldoon and Gary Sweet as four fathers who stay at home to raise their children. The program also focuses on their interconnected families and friends. In 2013, House Husbands won Most Popular Drama Series at the 2013 Logie Awards. In February 2018, Nine confirmed the series would not be returning for a sixth season and was officially cancelled.

== Production ==
=== Conception ===
On 6 May 2012, the Nine Network announced it had commissioned House Husbands, a ten-part comedy-drama about the issues of changing gender roles. The series focuses on four modern families where the men are in charge of raising the children. Nine's director of television, Michael Healy, stated "House Husbands is a fresh and dynamic look at Australian family life, with a very modern twist. Audiences will fall in love with our characters as they deal with the challenges of raising families in today's hectic world." House Husbands was conceived by Ellie Beaumont and Drew Proffitt. It was directed by Geoff Bennett and Shirley Barrett with Jo Rooney, Andy Ryan and Playmaker Media's David Maher and David Taylor serving as executive producers. House Husbands received funding from Screen Australia and filming on the series commenced at the end of May.

On 23 September 2012, Michael Idato from The Sydney Morning Herald reported Nine had renewed House Husbands for a second series. The network's director of television, Michael Healy, stated "I couldn't be happier that Australian audiences have taken House Husbands to their hearts and made it the number one drama in the country. I am thrilled to confirm a second series of House Husbands will go into production with the same acclaimed cast and crew". Filming for the second series took place from 4 February to 6 June 2013. Series two began airing from 8 April 2013.

In June 2013, House Husbands was picked up for a third season, which began airing in 2014. The Nine Network and Playmaker Media confirmed that all of the cast members would return. In July 2014, the Nine Network renewed House Husbands for a fourth season to air in 2015. The four male leads, as well as Morris and Saleeba, returned.

On 23 May 2016, TV Tonight reported that filming would begin in the last days of May, with all the main cast returning except for Gyton Grantley. On 28 October 2015, the Nine Network announced via Facebook that House Husbands had been renewed for a fifth season. The fifth season was set to air in 2016 but that August, Nine delayed the season to air on 6 February 2017.

On 4 February 2018, it was confirmed that Nine had officially cancelled the show after five seasons. The network also decided not to go ahead with a potential spin-off centred around Lewis Crabb (Sweet).

=== Casting ===
Casting of the series was announced on 18 May 2012 with Gary Sweet, Rhys Muldoon, Gyton Grantley and Firass Dirani cast as the house husbands. Sweet stars as Lewis, a successful builder who has become a stay-at-home dad to Matilda, while his partner, Gemma, is a senior nurse at the local hospital. Sweet commented "When I first got the House Husbands scripts I just felt like this was something that had legs." Julia Morris and Anna McGahan were cast as Lewis's partner Gemma and daughter Lucy. Muldoon plays Mark and Natalie Saleeba plays his wife Abi. Grantley plays Abi's brother Kane, who is in a relationship with Tom (Tim Campbell) and helping to raise his niece, Stella (Edwina Royce). Kane and Tom mark the first time that an Australian drama has featured a gay couple raising a child. Proffitt commented that Grantley was cast because of his comic timing and Campbell was cast because of his chemistry with the actor. Dirani plays Justin a disgraced former footballer who has broken up with the mother of his three children, Nicola (Leah de Niese). Nicholas Coghlan was cast as Rodney, Nicola's new partner.

The main cast members from season one all returned for the second series. Jo Rooney and Andy Ryan, the heads of drama at the Nine Network commented "We are thrilled to have House Husbands returning for a second season. With such a strong cast and some great names joining the series, we're excited to be providing more fantastic local drama for our viewers." Series two saw Geraldine Turner and Madeleine West join the cast as Wendy Horne and Dimity respectively. Craig McLachlan began appearing as Damo from episode three. Rick Donald stars as new school teacher, Mr. Tuck, while Kane and Tom welcomed a foster child called Finn, played by Ben Crundwell, into their family.

On 14 December 2013, it was announced that Campbell's character had been written out of the show and that he would not be returning for the third season. Campbell was surprised and disappointed with the decision, which came at the last minute. He commented "as a fan of the show I'm disappointed that a unique TV family is no more and Tom would leave his partner and children suddenly off screen. Don't blame me, I'm just the actor." A spokeswoman for Nine added that there would be other casting changes ahead of filming for the third season. The following month, it was announced that Lincoln Lewis had joined the cast as a "mysterious character that ignites tension" among the families. Actress Rachel Griffiths also joined the cast as Belle, a character "who brings friction to the series." Darren McMullen was cast "a love interest who ruffles feathers".

On 26 March 2015, it was announced Justine Clarke had joined the cast for the fourth season. She plays Eve, a rival for Kane. Actors Indiana Evans, Akos Armont and Jane Kennedy also join the cast as single mother Tash, the "ambitious" Dr Saxon and Belinda, the Director of Medical Services, respectively. Coghlan (Rodney) and Jane Allsop who previously appeared in the first series returned, alongside Danielle Horvat as Frankie from series three.

Actor Hugh Sheridan and singer Delta Goodrem joined the cast for the fifth season. Sheridan is Nick Gazecki, a new music teacher who makes an enemy of Lewis. While Goodrem plays Izzy Dreyfus, a reading recovery teacher at the Nepean South Primary School. Her character was billed as "both beautiful and slightly tomboyish. She excites and frightens everyone in the House Husbands world." Nancye Hayes and Roy Billing were cast as Mark's parents Liz and Bernie, and Rahart Adams joined as Justin's brother Rafiq.

== Cast and characters ==
=== Main ===
- Firass Dirani as Justin Baynie
- Rhys Muldoon as Mark Oliver
- Gary Sweet as Lewis Crabb
- Julia Morris as Gemma Horne Crabb
- Natalie Saleeba as Abigail "Abi" Albert
- Gyton Grantley as Kane Albert
- Jane Allsop as Rachel Hilton (season 1, 4–5)
- Hugh Sheridan as Nick Gazecki (season 5)
- Delta Goodrem as Izzy Dreyfus (season 5)
- Anna McGahan as Lucy Crabb (seasons 1–3)
- Georgia Flood as Phoebe Crabb (seasons 1–3)
- Tim Campbell as Tom Parker (seasons 1–2)
- Leah de Niese as Nicola Panas Baynie (seasons 1–2)
- Lincoln Lewis as Ned (season 3)
- Rachel Griffiths as Belle Crabb (season 3)
- Darren McMullen as Alex Larden (season 3–4)
- Justine Clarke as Eve (season 4)

=== Supporting ===
- Louise Siversen as Heather Looby
- Lily Jones as Poppy Oliver
- Madison Torres-Davy as Tilda Crabb
- Allegra Volange as Angie Baynie
- Fletcher Grant as Jacob Baynie
- Riley Webb as Zac Baynie
- Danielle Horvat as Frankie (season 3–4)
- Ava and Audrey Bellert as Sophie Oliver (season 3–5)
- Edwina Royce (season 1–3) and Jade Knight (season 4) as Stella Parker
- Nicholas Coghlan as Rodney (season 1, 4)
- Kate Jenkinson as Miss Nadir (season 1)
- Madeleine West as Dimity (season 2)
- Rick Donald as Mr. Harry Tuck (season 2)
- Les Hill as Simon Lawson-West (season 2)
- Terence Donovan as Doug (season 2)
- Ryan Johnson as Will Stevens (season 3)
- Ben Crundwell as Finn (seasons 2–4)
- Ben Schumann as Ryan (seasons 2–3)
- Helen Dallimore as Gaby (season 2-3)
- Craig McLachlan as Damo (season 2–3)
- Geraldine Turner as Wendy Horne (season 2–3)
- Danielle Carter as Dr Dalton (seasons 2–5)
- Denise Scott as Nurse Toni (season 4-5)
- Andrew Blackman as Hugh (4 episodes)

=== Guests ===
- Amy Lehpamer as BHC girl (1 episode)
- Clayton Watson as Charlie Cole (1 episode)
- Guy Edmonds as Liam (2 episodes)
- Indiana Evans as Tash (2 episodes)
- Jacqueline Brennan as Kerry the Tutor (1 episode)
- Jane Hall as Sarah (1 episode)
- Jane Harber as Georgina Rivers (1 episode)
- Jerome Ehlers as David (1 episode)
- Jodie Dry as Allison Paddocks (1 episode)
- John Adam as Dr Rayn Zanguard (1 episode)
- Julia Blake as Edith Benson (1 episode)
- Julie Nihill as Bronwyn (1 episode)
- Maria Mercedes as Mrs Panas (1 episode)
- Peta Brady as Tania (1 episode)
- Peter Curtin as John (2 episodes)
- Roy Billing as Bernie (1 episode)
- Sam Healy as Peta (1 episode)
- Toby Truslove as Joel (1 episode)

== Episodes ==
Series	Episodes	Originally released	
Series	Episodes	First released	Last released
1	10	2 September 2012	4 November 2012
2	13	8 April 2013	7 July 2013
3	13	9 June 2014	1 September 2014
4	10	10 August 2015	12 October 2015
5	12	6 February 2017	17 April 2017

== Reception ==
Of House Husbands, Graeme Blundell from The Australian wrote "It's a nice premise for a show, a kind of Aussie Modern Family and, while not as stylish, or stylised for that matter -- it's underplayed in a kind of low-key naturalism -- its producers similarly lace the family shenanigans with real emotion to balance the humour. Directed with flair by Geoff Bennett, it's a nicely paced character-based comedy-drama constructed from the comings and goings of, as one of the characters says, a bunch of 'useless parents having a crack'." Blundell went on to say that the show is "far removed from the childish shenanigans" of Two and a Half Men and is not as soapy as Packed to the Rafters, a show that it could replace as "TV's favourite family hour". He added "Sure, there's a blokey edge to House Husbands though, so far at least, it's never lascivious, sexist or plain dumb."

The first episode of House Husbands averaged 1.376 million viewers overnight, which was a ratings record. It also ranked first in the 16-39, 18-49 and 25-54-year-old demographics. Holly Byrnes from the Herald Sun reported that the show became the number one new Australian drama and a popular subject on social networking site Twitter, where it trended in Australia and gained praise from viewers who dubbed it Underbelly: Dads. Siobhan Duck from the Herald Sun stated "Thank goodness for House Husbands. The Melbourne-made drama is one of the better Aussie shows on TV. And certainly the only drama launched in 2012 to resonate with the audience. That's thanks largely to its stellar cast."

=== Accolades ===
Year	Award	Category	Recipients and nominees	Result	Ref(s)
2013	Logie Awards	Most Popular Actor	Firass Dirani	Nominated	
2013	Logie Awards	Most Popular Actress	Julia Morris	Nominated	
2013	Logie Awards	Most Popular Drama Series	House Husbands	Won	
2013	Logie Awards	Most Popular New Female Talent	Edwina Royce	Nominated	
2014	Logie Awards	Most Popular Actress	Julia Morris	Nominated	
2014	Logie Awards	Most Popular Drama Series	House Husbands	Nominated	
2015	Logie Awards	Most Popular Actress	Julia Morris	Nominated	
2015	Logie Awards	Most Popular Drama Series	House Husbands	Nominated	
2016	Logie Awards	Best Actor	Firass Dirani	Nominated	
2016	Logie Awards	Best Actress	Julia Morris	Nominated	
2016	Logie Awards	Best Drama Program	House Husbands	Nominated	

=== Series ratings ===
Season	# of Episodes	Season Premiere	Season Final	Peak Audience	Average Audience	Drama Rank
1	10	2 September 2012	4 November 2012	1,578,000	1,284,000	#8
2	13	8 April 2013	7 July 2013	1,337,000	1,180,000	#11
3	13	9 June 2014	1 September 2014	1,275,000	1,071,000	#17
4	10	10 August 2015	12 October 2015		972,000	#10
5	12	6 February 2017	17 April 2017		831,000	#14

== International remakes ==
In July 2014, it was announced that House Husbands was to be re-made in France and Italy, after ZDF Enterprises, which owns the international rights to the series, negotiated a deal with French and Italian production companies Made In PM and Publispei. On February 17, 2017 premiered on Canale 5 the Italian version of the series under the title "Amore pensaci tu" (Love, you take care of it). The two one-hour episodes were watched by 2.86 million viewers. While the series premiered with good ratings, ratings slowly diminished throughout its run. Due to low ratings the series moved to late night.

== See also ==
- List of Australian television series
- Guys with Kids
