= Anisa Nandaula =

Australian comedian

- Born: 8 July 1998 (age 28); Kampala, Uganda
- Occupations: Comedian; poet

Comedy career
- Years active: 2020–present
- Medium: Stand-up

Anisa Nandaula (born 8 July 1998) is an Australian comedian, poet, and author.

== Early life ==
Nandaula was born on 8 July 1998 in Kampala, Uganda. Her mother and siblings moved to Rockhampton, Queensland, when she was seven. A year later, they relocated to Brisbane. She graduated from Runcorn State High School.

== Career ==
=== Poetry ===
After high school, Nandaula studied law and political science at Griffith University. During this time she began to perform slam poetry. In 2016, she was the Queensland Poetry Slam champion, and she has performed at Splendour in the Grass, the Sydney Opera House, and the Woodford Folk Festival.

Nandaula was runner-up at the Australian Poetry Slam in 2016, and won the 2018 Queensland Poetry XYZ Innovation in Spoken Word Prize. She co-founded the poetry organisation Voices of Colour in 2016.

Her debut poetry collection, Melanin Garden, was published in 2017.

Nandaula wrote, directed, and performed in the theatre show The Grass is Dead on the Other Side in 2018 at the Wonderland Festival.

Her poem "Human" appeared in Solid Air: Australian and New Zealand Spoken Word (2019) and Volume 8 of the Australian Poetry Anthology (2020).

=== Comedy ===
She said her transition from poetry to comedy during the COVID-19 pandemic made her feel "reborn", and likened the reading of poetry to performing stand-up comedy. She also maintains popular accounts on Instagram and TikTok. Nandaula worked at a bank while beginning her comedy career.

She was featured in The Welcome, a collection of short films, in 2021.

In June 2023, Nandaula hosted HEAL's (Home of Expressive Arts and Learning) Songs of Hope event. She gave the closing address at the 2024 Welcoming Australia Symposium.

She created and co-wrote the 6-episode short series Let's Break Up, based on a stage show.

Nandaula opened for Chelsea Handler during Handler's Little Big Bitch tour in Australia in 2024. In 2025, she performed her first comedy show, You Can't Say That, in Adelaide and at the Brisbane Comedy Festival, the Melbourne International Comedy Festival, the New Zealand International Comedy Festival, and the Sydney Comedy Festival.

She appeared on Thank God You're Here in October 2024 and is the Gen Z "team captain" on Talkin' 'Bout Your Gen. She appeared in series 5 of Taskmaster Australia in 2026, and was cast in Urzila Carlson's sketch series URZILA.

Nandaula performed a comedy show, No Small Talk, in 2026.

In January 2026, Nandaula signed with Jubilee Street Management.

== Personal life ==
Nandaula unsuccessfully ran for office for the Greens during the 2017 Queensland state elections for the district of Stretton. She was the subject of painter Tamara Armstrong's work Melanin Garden (2019) as well as of a mural by Tori-Jay Mordey in 2021. Nandaula has also collaborated with Matt Hsu's Obscure Orchestra.

She lives in Runcorn.

Nandaula is Muslim.
