= Australians in Film =

Non-profit organization

- Formation: 2001
- Type: Film and television industry organization
- Purpose: Promotion of Australian filmmakers and performers in the United States
- Headquarters: Los Angeles
- Location: 5300 Melrose Avenue, Hollywood CA 90038
- Region served: Los Angeles
- Members: 600
- Official language: English
- President: Kate Marks
- Website: australiansinfilm.org/hls/

Australians in Film (AiF) is a Los Angeles-based non-profit organization that serves the Australian community working in the film and television industry. It awards the annual Heath Ledger Scholarship to emerging Australian actors, as well as several other programs which help actors and filmmakers to develop their careers.

== History ==
Australians in Film was founded in Los Angeles, California, in May 2001, to celebrate and support Australian film and TV makers and their work.

In 2008, Australians in Film established the annual Heath Ledger Scholarship, named in honor of Australian actor Heath Ledger, who was an ambassador of the group.

In 2012 the organization established an Annual Benefit Dinner to raise funds for scholarships and career development programs. The honorees at the first event included John Polson, Liam Hemsworth and Yvonne Strahovski. In 2013, Australians in Film launched the Orry-Kelly International Award for Australians who have achieved in the film and TV business overseas.

In 2015, Australians in Film announced that Foxtel will become the naming rights sponsor of the Breakthrough Awards.

== Description ==
AiF is based at the Raleigh Studios in Hollywood, occupying a shared workspace known as Charlie's.

As of May 2022 AiF has over 700 members, who included actors, filmmakers and people from the U.S. film industry.

== Governance and funding ==
As of May 2022 producer Emma Cooper is chair of the board that oversees the organisation.

AiF is supported by Screen Australia, Screen NSW, Screen Queensland, Film Victoria, AFTRS and the University of Melbourne (Victorian College of the Arts), as well as commercial partners including Ausfilm, Animal Logic, Bird in Hand winery, Yowie Chocolates, Penfolds and Raynor & Associates.

== Programs and awards ==
AiF runs a number of programs to help Australian actors and filmmakers to develop their careers. Untapped (for emerging writers and directors), Talent Gateway (for established writers and directors), and Global Producers Exchange (for producers) are programs presented by Screen Australia and supported by Screen NSW, VicScreen, Screen Queensland, and the South Australian Film Corporation.

AiF is also home to Charlie's, a creative co-working space and industry incubator founded in 2016 by Screen NSW, AFTRS, and Film Victoria (now VicScreen), named after Charlie Chaplin and originally intended as a "soft landing" for Australian professionals new to Hollywood. It and has grown and expanded since then, and is located at AiF headquarters in West Hollywood.

=== Heath Ledger Scholarship ===
The Heath Ledger Scholarship includes a $US10,000 cash prize; a return economy flight to the US; and administrative and educational support for the actor's career.

Winners include:

- 2009 Oliver Ackland
- 2010 Bella Heathcote
- 2011 Ryan Corr
- 2012 Anna McGahan
- 2013 James Mackay
- 2014 Cody Fern
- 2015 Matt Levett
- 2016 Ashleigh Cummings
- 2017 Mojean Aria
- 2018 Charmaine Bingwa
- 2021 Rahel Romahn

=== Breakthrough Award winners ===
- 2009 Sam Worthington, Anna Torv, and Craig Gillespie
- 2010 Chris Hemsworth and Ryan Kwanten
- 2011 Joel Edgerton, Teresa Palmer, and David Michôd
- 2012 Liam Hemsworth, and Yvonne Strahovski
- 2013 Jacki Weaver, Sullivan Stapleton, and Alex O'Loughlin
- 2014 Margot Robbie and Brenton Thwaites
- 2015 Elizabeth Debicki
- 2016 Jai Courtney, Garth Davies
- 2017 Alethea Jones, Warwick Thornton, Katherine Langford, and Danielle Macdonald
- 2018 Keiynan Lonsdale, Eliza Scanlen, Margot Robbie, Chris Hemsworth, Warwick Thornton, Elizabeth Debicki, Joel Edgerton, Katherine Langford, James Wan, and Mia Wasikowska

=== International honorees ===
- 2012 John Polson
- 2013 Baz Luhrmann, Blue-Tongue Films and Steve Papazian (of Warner Bros.)
- 2014 Greg Coote (formerly of Dune Entertainment), Anthony LaPaglia, Zareh Nalbandian (of Animal Logic), and Fred Baron (of 20th Century Fox)
- 2015 Bruna Papandrea, Bill Mechanic and Dion Beebe
- 2016 Sir Ridley Scott, Greg Basser and James Wan
- 2017 Tim Minchin, Paul Steinke & Mary Ann Hughes and Luke Davies
- 2018 Lee Smith, Mark Johnson
