= Talkin' 'Bout Your Gen =

Australian game show

- 2025 logo
- Also known as: Talkin' 'Bout Your Generation (2009–2019)
- Genre: Game show
- Written by: Shaun Micallef (2009–2012, 2018–2019); Stephen Hall (2009–2012); Michael Ward (2009–2012, 2018); Ros Breeden (2009); Jo Gill (2009); Tommy Dassalo (2009); Brenna Glazebrook (2009); David Lawrence (2009); Andy Matthews (2018–2019); Alasdair Tremblay-Birchall (2018–2019)
- Directed by: Jon Olb (2009–2012, 2018–2019)
- Presented by: Shaun Micallef (2009–2012, 2018–2019); Anne Edmonds (2025–present)
- Starring: Amanda Keller (2009–2012); Charlie Pickering (2009–2012); Josh Thomas (2009–2012); Robyn Butler (2018–2019); Andy Lee (2018–2019); Laurence Boxhall (2018–2019); Dave Hughes (2025–present); Tommy Little (2025–present); Anisa Nandaula (2025–present)
- Voices of: Pete Smith (2019)
- Theme music composer: Yuri Worontschak (2009–2012)
- Country of origin: Australia
- Original language: English
- No. of series: 7
- No. of episodes: 96 (list of episodes)

Production
- Executive producers: Peter Beck (2009–2012, 2018–2019); Stephen Tate (2009–2012)
- Producers: Lara Hopkins (2009); Melinda Zahra (2010–2012); Sally Heron (2018); Paul Coughlin (2019)
- Production locations: Docklands Studios, Docklands, Melbourne, Australia (2009–2012, 2018–2019); NEP Studios, Eveleigh, Sydney, Australia, (2025–present)
- Editor: Ken Hardie (2012, 2018)
- Camera setup: Multi-camera
- Running time: Approximately 44 minutes (excluding commercials)
- Production company: ITV Studios Australia (Note: Known as Granada Media Australia in the original version)

Original release
- Network: Network Ten
- Release: 5 May 2009 – 29 March 2012
- Network: Nine Network
- Release: 21 May 2018 – 26 June 2019
- Network: Network 10
- Release: 16 September 2025 – present

Talkin' 'Bout Your Gen (previously known as Talkin' 'Bout Your Generation) is an Australian television game show produced by Granada Productions. The first four seasons aired on Network Ten (2009–2012), before moving to the Nine Network (2018–2019) for two seasons. The show was originally hosted by Shaun Micallef.

The series returned to Network 10 in September 2025, under the name Talkin' 'Bout Your Gen, hosted by Anne Edmonds.

== History ==
=== Original run ===
Talkin' 'Bout Your Generation's logo between 2009 and 2012

The first series ran on Network Ten for 18 episodes. The first run generation team captains were Amanda Keller (Baby Boomers), Charlie Pickering (Generation X) and Josh Thomas (Generation Y). The original production order extended due to the success of the show.

A second series of 26 episodes began airing from 7 February 2010. Series 2 had a planned hiatus after episode 10 on 18 April 2010 and returned to finish its run on 1 August 2010.

The third series of the show began on 8 February 2011.

On 27 October 2011, Talkin' 'Bout Your Generation was renewed for a fourth series. On 22 January 2012, it was announced that the show would begin airing Series 4 on 1 February 2012 in an 8 pm timeslot.

=== Nine Network run ===
Talkin' 'Bout Your Generation's logo between 2018 and 2019

In September 2017, it was announced that the show would be revived on the Nine Network for 8 episodes with Micallef returning as host. In October 2017, the series was officially confirmed for revival set to air in 2018, as well as the announcement of the series captains. Generation X was led by Robyn Butler, Generation Y was led by Andy Lee and Generation Z was led by Laurence Boxhall. It has a new set and it also changed its graphics including new logo and as well as fonts, sets and theme song and primary colours. The primary colours are red (Generation X), yellow (Generation Y) and blue (Generation Z). The show was once again filmed at Docklands Studios in Melbourne. It is recorded in front of a live audience of 500 people.

In October 2018, the series was renewed for a sixth season at Nine's upfronts with Micallef returning as host with Lee, Butler and Boxhall returning as series captains. The series premiered on 1 May 2019.

=== Return to 10 ===
On 16 September 2024 at Paramount's 2025 upfronts, it was announced the series would be returning to Network 10 in 2025, with new host and new captains to be announced and simply titled "Talkin' 'Bout Your Gen". The generations will include Gen X, the Millennials and the Zoomers. In April 2025, it was announced that comedian Anne Edmonds will host the series, replacing Micallef. In May 2025, Dave Hughes, Tommy Little and Anisa Nandaula were announced as team captains for Gen X, Gen Y & Gen Z, respectively. The series premiered on 16 September 2025.

== Format ==
Talkin' 'Bout Your Generation (also known as TAYG) is an hour-long quiz show testing the popular culture knowledge of teams from three different cultural generations. Each team captain is joined by a different guest each episode who is part of their respective generations. However, on occasion there have been guests not actually part of the generation they represent on the show. (For example, Ian Smith and George Negus have featured as Baby Boomers but are actually members of the older Silent Generation.) For the original run, the guests up to 30 are placed in the Generation Y team, guests aged 30–45 in the Generation X team and guests aged 45 and over in the Baby Boomer team. During the second run, guests aged 25 and under are placed in the Generation Z team, guests aged 25–40 in the Generation Y team, and guests aged 40–55 in the Generation X team.

Typically, each episode features six rounds (five rounds in series 5 & 6)with the three teams competing in various themed games which feature wordplay-based names such as What's A Doodle Doo?, Name That Tee and ¡chronoloco!. One point is awarded for each correct answer, though in practice points can be awarded or deducted at Shaun's own discretion. The first three rounds involve the contestants buzzing in first to give their answer. Games played in these rounds can involve identifying missing television characters from a cast picture, identifying a company name from a partially constructed logo, or identifying a catchphrase and its origin from a T-shirt.

The fourth round sees teams choosing from four categories from the main display (dubbed the "magic window"), and often involves their participation on the studio floor on their part. Games include matching up celebrity pairs (such as famous mothers and daughters) on the screen, ransacking a period setting to identify anachronistic items, and performing charades. From 2018, it was used in the third round.

The fifth round, called "Your Generation" and later Yo-Gen, sees all teams quizzed in turn on themed questions relevant to their particular generation and based on a certain topic or Yo-Gen Subject. In this round, one point is awarded for each correct answer and two points are lost with each incorrect answer. In 2018, the fourth round was used. In 2019, it was part of the magic window.

The final round, called End Game, sees all teams trying to complete a physical task, usually to be judged by Shaun. The number of points awarded is random but almost certainly allows for any team to win; therefore the winner of the End Game is the winner of the episode.

The winning team is presented with a secondhand trophy donated by Shaun (first series), viewers (third, fourth and fifth series), as a vanity prize. During the second series, a specially made TAYG trophy was presented to the winning team; the trophy featured three people (representing the three generations playing) raising a flag pole with a TAYG flag on top. In the sixth series (2019), Pete Smith provided the voiceover with the winning prize and an announcer sign-off at the end of the show, for example "This is Pete Smith speaking."

=== Series 7 changes ===
Each episode features five rounds with the three teams competing. The first round is various themed games such as "Mullet Over". One point is awarded for each correct answer, though in practice points can be awarded or deducted at Anne's own discretion.

The second round sees teams choosing from four categories was now from the big screen replacing magic window. All categories were returned such as Film & TV, Music, Celebrities, Lifestyle, News & Current Affairs and Sport. New categories are including History and Technology.

The third round now seeing all teams that guessing for example "Pit Happens".

The fourth round also now seeing themed choices such as "Wiki-Oke", as it shares between a team captain and a team guest.

End Game replaced by As Quick As for the final round.

== Cast ==
=== Hosts ===
- Shaun Micallef (Host, 2009–2012, 2018–2019)
- Anne Edmonds (Host, 2025–present)

=== Network Ten original cast ===
- Amanda Keller (Team Captain, Baby Boomers, 2009–2012)
- Charlie Pickering (Team Captain, Generation X, 2009–2012)
- Josh Thomas (Team Captain, Generation Y, 2009–2012)

=== Nine Network iteration cast ===
- Robyn Butler (Team Captain, Generation X, 2018–2019)
- Andy Lee (Team Captain, Generation Y, 2018–2019)
- Laurence Boxhall (Team Captain, Generation Z, 2018–2019)

=== Network 10 reboot cast ===
- Dave Hughes (Team Captain, Gen X, 2025–present)
- Tommy Little (Team Captain, Gen Y, 2025–present)
- Anisa Nandaula (Team Captain, Gen Z, 2025–present)

== List of games ==
=== First Network Ten iteration ===
These are some of the games that are featured in the show from 2009 to 2012. Not all of them are mentioned.

- Accessory Before the Fact - Teams are shown an item which is famously owned by a film or television character and must identify the character to which it belongs.
- Ad Hoc - Teams are shown a still image from a famous television commercial and receive a point for correctly identifying the product being advertised.
- As Quick As - Teams answer a series of rapid-fire questions before a novelty timer runs out, typically the boiling of an electric kettle. Sometimes the kettle would be replaced with other timers such as a professional woodchopper.
- Befuddled - Teams are shown a series of movie posters which have been mixed up by the "Befuddlo-Mesh" screen. The poster is progressively defuddled and teams get points inverse to the number of times it has been defuddled.
- Better Read Than Dead - Shaun reads a series of first lines from famous books and teams must identify the book it belongs to.
- Charlie Was Wrong - Teams were shown a doctored video of Charlie answering a question incorrectly from a previous series. The team to correctly answer the question was awarded 15 points. The twist was that given Charlie had previously "answered" the question, he was locked out (his teammate wad allowed to answer the question).
- Chicken or Egg? (Originally called What Came First?) - Teams are shown two products, events, or businesses and must decide which one of them came first.
- Chinese Internet - Teams are shown series of facts in which one of the words has been "censored by the Chinese Government". Teams write down the word on a chalkboard and get a point if they correctly identify the missing word.
- Fad-tastic - Teams are shown a series of images depicting items or activities which were popular across different generations. Teams received one point for identifying the fad, and another point for identifying the decade in which it reached peak popularity.
- Franken-Face (originally called Gen Modified) - Teams are shown a composite image of a person with the features of 3 famous people, one from each of the generations. Teams get a point for each person identified.
- Going Somewhere Solo - Teams are shown a series of images of singers who famously split from a band or group and became solo acts. Teams get a point for identifying the band or group they split from.
- Human Fly - Teams are shown a series of celebrities whose heads have been replaced with that of a fly. Teams receive a point for correctly identifying the celebrity. A variation of the game called Bride of the Fly involved teams identifying the male half of couples on their wedding day.
- Is She Really Going Out With Him? - Teams are shown images of the female half of famous television couples and must identify the boyfriend or husband of the character shown.
- Look What They Have Done to my Album Cover - Teams are shown a series of famous album covers with something added to it, and they must identify the element that does not appear on the regular cover.
- Name That Tee - Teams are presented with a series of t-shirts featuring designs that relate to an element of popular culture. Teams get a point for identifying the popular culture reference.
- Name That Tune - Teams hear a series of songs and must identify the name of each.
- Nobody's Business - Teams are shown a series of fictional business or product names from television shows and must identify the show it comes from.
- Original or Sequel? - Teams are shown sill images from movies and must identify whether the scene occurred in the original film or a sequel.
- Pandamonium - Teams are shown a series of historical photographs in which a key figure has been replaced with a panda. Teams get one point for identifying the figure replaced, and one point for identifying thr historical event.
- Pals at the Pictures - Teams are shown the image of one half of a famous movie duo. Teams must identify the member of the duo not pictured.
- Partners in Primetime - Teams are shown the image of one half of a famous television couple. Teams are awarded one point for correctly identifying the other half of the couple, and one point for identifying the series in which they appeared. A variation of this game involved teams naming the character from television or film based on an image of their mode of transport.
- Poli-Waffle - Shaun reads out a series of sentences made up of two halves of famous political quotes. Teams must identify the two politicians who made the original quotes, receiving a point for each correctly identified.
- Present and Correct - Teams are shown up to 5 presents and must identify the celebrity that might be receiving them. Teams receive points for correctly identifying the celebrity inverse to the number of presents seen (5 points for 1 present down to 1 point for all 5 presents).
- Slogan's Run - Shaun reads out a series of promotional taglines from famous movies, and teams must identify the movie it was promoting.
- Sounds Like History - Shaun reads a series of nonsense sentences related to a historical event and teams must identify the event being referred to. For example: Redmond Pillory bonkers Never-Rest becomes Edmund Hillary conquers Everest.
- Spoilers Ahoy - Shaun reads a series of twist endings from famous movies, and teams must identify the film the spoiler is referring to. To help viewers avoid the spoilers, Shaun would hold up an image of Groucho Marx before revealing the answer.
- TV Spin-offs - Teams are shown an image from a television series and must identify the series in which it was a spinoff from.
- Vita Alla Voce - Teams are shown images of famous cartoon characters and must identify the person who provided the voice.
- Waki-Leaks - Similar to Chinese Internet, teams are provided with part of a factoid, and must write on their tablets the missing element.
- What's a Doodle Doo? - Teams are shown a series of well-known corporate logos one segment at a time. Each logo consists of 5 segments, and teams receive points inverse to the number of segments revealed (5 points for 1 segment, down to 1 point for all 5). Variants of this game involved teams identifying cartoon characters and album covers.
- What Just Happened?
- What you Talkin' bout, Willis? - Teams are asked a series of questions related to slang terms or phases used by people across the generations.
- Who Am I Doing?
- Who Goes There? - Teams are shown the cast of a television series, with one of the members being removed. Teams are awarded one point for identifying the character, and one point for identifying the actor or actress that played them. A variation of this game called Arf! Who Goes There? involved teams identifying the missing dog from cast shots.
- Who Wears What? - Teams are shown images of famous celebrities with their faces obscured wearing an iconic outfit, receiving a point for correctly identifying the celebrity shown.
- Whosebook - Teams are shown up to 5 clues on a hypothetical Facebook-style profile of a famous person and must identify who the profile belongs to. Teams receive points inverse to the number of clues seen (5 points for 1 clue down to 1 point for all 5 clues).
- Whose Ink Do You Think? - Teams are shown a series of tattoos as worn by celebrities and must identify the celebrity it belongs to.
- You've Got Tagged
- You Say Various Things - Shaun would begin by saying they had a new game to play instead of As Quick As, with the rules explained in a complicated and long song. Once the song finished, Shaun would receive a phone call stating they were out of time to play the new game. They would then play As Quick As.

Games featured in the Magic Window: The Magic Window is the large screen in the background of the TAYG set. The teams pick one of four buttons from the window which are labelled with the genres (Art, Brands, Celebrities, Film & TV, Language, Leisure, Lifestyle, Music, News & Current Affairs and Sport) of the game that is featured in that button and later, things or people relating to a certain subject. Trust Me was in one of the buttons.

- All The Right Moves - One team member would perform a series of dances or dance moves from across the generations, while the other guessed, earning a point for each correctly identified move or dance.
- ¡chronoloco! - The team would be presented with six images or items from a particular category and have to place them in correct chronological order.
- Draw That... - One team member would be shown a series of clues from a category of popular culture (for example, film titles) and would have to draw a depiction of them while the other member guessed.
- Era Error - The team would be presented with a room accurately depicting a scene from the past with six anachronistic items. The team would earn a point for each correctly identified error.
- Fallen Stars - The team would be shown images of famous people and would have to match them to the naughty act they committed.
- Famous Dogs - The team would have to match the celebrities shown to the dogs they famously owned.
- HG Wells' Time Machine
- Hollywood Sports - The team would be shown images of famous sporting personalities and had to match them to their Hollywood spouses.
- It Could Be Worth - The team would be presented with 8 items in a showcase, each from a different period of history. The team would be given a budget to buy these items without knowing their true value. If the team stayed under budget, they received a point for everything they purchased.
- It's Just a Stage Name - The team would be shown images of famous performers who used stage names and have to match them to their real names.
- Mash Up - The team would enter a scene where a series of band names would be acted out, and must correctly identify the band.
- Mummy Dearest - The team would be shown images of famous Hollywood mothers and have to match them to their children.
- Name That Tune - The team would be played a series of TV theme tunes and had to guess the show it came from.
- Prop My... - One team member would use a set of props to act out a series of clues from popular culture (e.g. movie scenes or song titles), while the other member guessed.
- Stars Behind Bars - The team are presented with six mugshots of famous celebrities and must arrange them in the correct chronological order of their arrest. A point was earned for each correctly placed image.
- The Secret Life of Walter's Ditties - The team would have to guess the song based on lyrics being read by "Walter Brennan" on the Magic Window.
- Third Drawer Down - The team would pull a series of items from the third drawer of the TAYG chest of drawers, receiving one point for correctly identifying the object, and another point for correctly guessing the decade it became popular.
- Trash Talk - The team would rummage through a series of bins, pulling out items relating to a celebrity. They would receive a point for each celebrity correctly identified.
- Trust Me - One team member would be forced into a contraption (for example, strapped to a wheel) while the other answered a series of questions. Correct answers received a point and a reward for the victim, while incorrect answers resulted in the victim being punished. Such punishments included the creation of a human lamington, or the releasing of hungry birds into an aviary while the victim wore a seed hat.
- Watch Your Mouth - One team member becomes the mouth of a famous person facing the Magic Window, while the other person must ask questions to guess their identity. On the Magic Window would be a series of verboten words which if said by the celebrity mouth would disqualify the team from the round.
- What Am I Eating? - One team member would be blindfolded and fed six food items from a particular category (e.g confectionary). The blindfolded team member would get one point for identifying the food, and another point for identifying the decade it was first popular. An alternative to this game was What Am I Smelling?
- What On Earth Was That? - The team would be presented with six household items that have been crushed by a steamroller. They would get one point for identifying the item, and another point for the decade in which it was popular.
- Who Said That? - One team member would perform a series of quotes from famous people, while the other member guessed the person who said it.

=== Nine Network iteration ===
These are some of the games that are featured in the show from 2018 to 2019. Not all of them are mentioned. New games are in bold.

- As Quick As
- Befuddled
- Chicken or Egg?
- Chinese Internet
- Franken-Face
- Human Fly
- **Logo A Go Go**
- **Merch of Time**
- **Objectification**
- Pandamonium
- Poli-waffle
- Slogan's Run
- Sounds Like History
- Spoilers Ahoy
- **What's App, Doc?**

Games featured in the Magic Window: The Magic Window is the large screen in the background of the TAYG set. The teams pick one of four buttons from the window which are labelled with the genre of game that is featured in that button and later, things or people relating to a certain subject. New games are in bold. Who Am I Doing? and What Just Happened now appeared on the Magic Window was included.

- **Add & Distract**
- **Alien Autopsy**
- **Anachronistuck**
- **Beat the Boomer, Baby**
- ¡chronoloco!
- Draw That...
- **Lip Reading**
- **Meals on Heels**
- Name That Tune
- Time Machine
- Trust Me
- Watch Your Mouth
- **What Art Thou?**
- What Just Happened?
- Who Am I Doing?

=== Second Network 10 iteration ===
These are some of the games that are featured in the show from 2025.

- **Beat the Alpha**
- **Mullet Over**
- **Paul Slogan**
- **Pit Happens**
- **Silent Disco**
- **Wiki-Oke**

Games featured in the big screen The big screen in the background of the TAYG set. The teams pick one of four buttons from the window which are labelled with the genres (Celebrities, Film & TV, History, Lifestyle, Music, Sport and Technology) of the game that is featured in that button and later, things or people relating to a certain subject.

- Franken-Face
- **Hey Fever**
- Prop My Scene

== Episodes ==
The first series began airing on 5 May 2009. It ran for 18 episodes concluding with a Christmas special on 22 November 2009. Due to the popularity of the first series, a second series was commissioned and began airing on 7 February 2010. The series aired for 10 episodes and took a three-month break before resuming on 1 August 2010. The series then ran for a further 16 episodes, totalling 26 for the second series. Also, a highlights episode, dubbed 'family assortment', was aired on 4 April 2010. A third series of the show began broadcast on 8 February 2011. Similar to the second series, the third series was split into two distinct blocks for broadcast. It concluded on 18 September 2011.

Series	Episodes	Originally released		
Series	Episodes	First released	Last released	Network
1	18	5 May 2009	22 November 2009	Network Ten
2	26	7 February 2010	28 November 2010	Network Ten
3	18	8 February 2011	18 September 2011	Network Ten
4	10	1 February 2012	29 March 2012	Network Ten
5	8	21 May 2018	9 July 2018	Nine Network
6	8	1 May 2019	26 June 2019	Nine Network
7	8	16 September 2025	4 November 2025	Network 10

== Reception ==
=== Ratings ===
The first series of the show, which aired at 7:30 pm Tuesday night, was very successful ratings-wise with the show considered a surprise hit. The premiere episode of the show debuted with an average of 1,648,000 viewers, coming in first for the night and fourth for the week. The subsequent episode drew in 1,599,000 viewers, coming both first for the night and the week. The highest rating episode was the eighth, which averaged 1,754,000 viewers. The 2009 Christmas special aired at a 6:30 pm Sunday night timeslot. In comparison, it drew in only 1,060,000 viewers.

The second series of the show debuted in the 7:30 pm Sunday night timeslot, with the series premiere drawing in 1,323,000 viewers. After sixteen episodes the show returned to the 7:30 pm Tuesday night slot to make way for the broadcast of Junior MasterChef Australia on Sunday nights. The ratings figures for the second season were generally behind the high figures set during the first series. The season finale, which also doubled as the 2010 Christmas special, drew in 1,450,000 viewers.

=== Awards ===
The show was nominated for both the Most Popular and Most Outstanding Light Entertainment awards at the 2010 Logie Awards. In addition, Shaun Micallef was nominated for both the Gold Logie and the Most Popular Presenter awards for his work on the show. The show won in both categories it was nominated for with Shaun Micallef winning the Logie for Most Popular Presenter alongside. He did not win the gold Logie. Team captains Josh Thomas and Charlie Pickering were also nominated for the Most Popular New Male Talent Logie.

Year	Nominee	Award	Result
2010	Shaun Micallef	Most Popular Presenter	Won
2010	Talkin 'Bout Your Generation	Most Popular Light Entertainment	Won
2010	Talkin 'Bout Your Generation	Most Outstanding Light Entertainment	Won
2010	Shaun Micallef	Gold Logie	Nominated
2010	Charlie Pickering	Most Popular New Male Talent	Nominated
2010	Josh Thomas	Most Popular New Male Talent	Nominated
2011			Nominated
2011	Shaun Micallef	Silver Logie Award for Most Popular TV Presenter	Nominated
2011	Talkin' 'Bout Your Generation	Most Popular Light Entertainment Program	Nominated
2011	Talkin' 'Bout Your Generation	Most Outstanding Light Entertainment Program	Nominated
