= Anna McGahan =

Australian actress and playwright (born 1988)

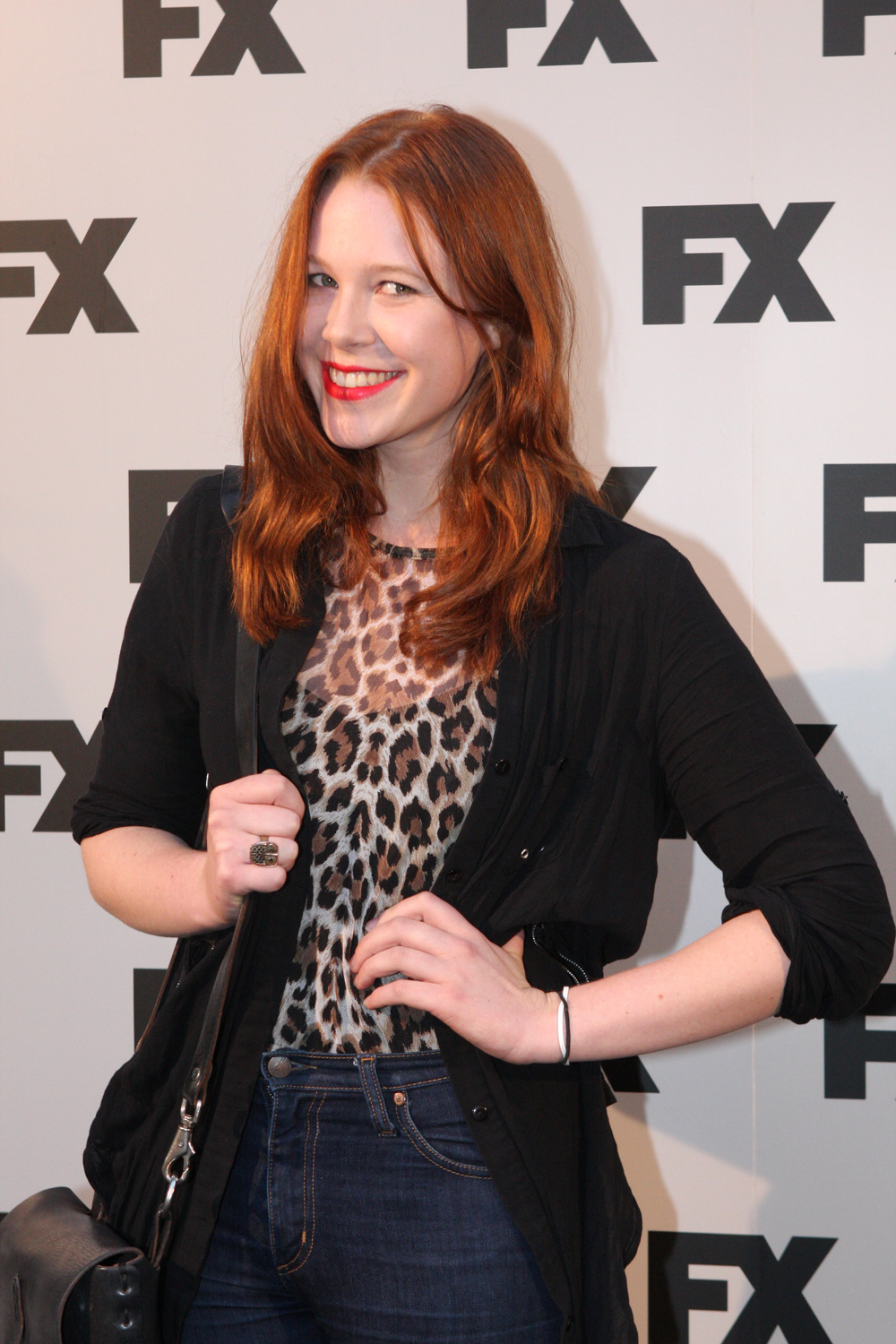
- McGahan in 2012
- Born: 2 May 1988 (age 38); Brisbane, Queensland, Australia
- Education: QUT and AFTRS
- Occupations: Actress; playwright
- Years active: 2009–present
- Notable work: Underbelly: Razor (2011); ANZAC Girls (2014); House Husbands (2012–2014); The Doctor Blake Mysteries (2015–2018)
- Spouse: Jonathan Weir (m. 2017; div. 2021)
- Children: 2

Anna McGahan (born 2 May 1988) is an Australian actress and playwright. She is best known for playing the roles of Nellie Cameron on the television series, Underbelly: Razor (2011), Lucy in House Husbands (2012–2014), and Rose Anderson in The Doctor Blake Mysteries (2015–2018).

== Early life ==
McGahan grew up in Coorparoo, Queensland, Growing up she was a dedicated ballet dancer, training for 15 years, but also had aspirations to be a writer. Attending Brisbane Girls Grammar School, she received the highest graduating result possible - an OP1, before beginning a psychology degree. After joining an amateur theatre group at university, she abandoned her course of study, deciding instead to undertake a Bachelor of Fine Arts (Acting) at QUT, which she graduated from in 2010. She subsequently relocated to Sydney. She studied screenwriting at AFTRS in 2015.

== Career ==
McGahan has appeared in Australian film, television and theatre. Her most notable appearance to date is starring as Nellie Cameron in the hit Australian TV series Underbelly: Razor, in which she plays a 16-year-old 1920s prostitute from a wealthy background who influenced some of the era's most powerful men, for which she won the Inside Film 'Out of the Box' Award, was shortlisted for the Queensland Premier's Drama Award and was nominated for two Logies.

In 2012 she received a 'Best Emerging Artist' Matilda Award for her performance in La Boite Theatre Company’s Julius Caesar.

McGahan appeared in the 2012 film 100 Bloody Acres and Australian TV series House Husbands on the Nine Network in the same year.

On 27 June 2012, McGahan was awarded the Heath Ledger scholarship at the Australians in Film benefit in Los Angeles.

In 2014 she played Sister Olive Haynes in ANZAC Girls, a six-part miniseries for ABC Television that was based closely on real characters from the Australian and New Zealand nurses and troops who served in World War I. McGahan plays opposite Brandon McClelland, as the Australian soldier Norval 'Pat' Dooley, who married Haynes in 1917.

In May 2021, McGahan played Katharina in William Shakespeare's The Taming of the Shrew with Queensland Theatre (in the Bille Brown Theatre, Brisbane), directed by Damien Ryan. Petruchio was played by Nicholas Brown.

In 2023, McGahan was named as part of the cast for ABC musical drama In Our Blood.

McGahan is also a playwright and published author. She won the Queensland Theatre Company Young Playwright's Award in 2009 and 2010, and was shortlisted for the Queensland Premier’s Drama Award in 2011 for her play He's Seeing Other People Now, which she produced through the Metro Arts Independents Season in Brisbane. Together with Joel McKerrow, she co-wrote the theatre piece The People of the Sun, which toured Melbourne and Sydney in 2016 and 2017.

In 2016 she was shortlisted for The Saturday Paper's national essay award, the Horne Prize for her piece Brightness. In 2023, she won The Australian/Vogel Literary Award. for her debut novel Immaculate, which was also shortlisted for the 2024 MUD Prize and 2024 Queensland Literary Awards 'Book of the Year'. She is adapting the novel for the screen with funding from Screen Queensland. Her novel Metanoia, was shortlisted for the international ECPA Award for Best Memoir/Biography. She has also been published by Griffith Review, The Guardian and Mamamia.

== Personal life ==
In 2012 McGahan converted to Christianity while reading a Gideon's Bible in a hotel room, where she had a "series of spiritual encounters". In 2019 her memoir of her spiritual journey was published by Acorn Press, and was nominated for the global ECPA Christian Book Awards. She is no longer heavily involved in the church as an institution, and in 2021 stated that she creates work that ‘prioritises a defiant female gaze to explore experiences of embodiment, motherhood, sexuality and spirituality’.

McGahan married Jonathan Weir in April 2017. They welcomed their first child, Mercy Weir, in February 2018, born prematurely at 33 weeks. They separated in 2021, and she now lives in Brisbane with her two children.

== Bibliography ==
- McGahan, Anna (19 August 2019). Metanoia: A Memoir of a Body, Born Again. Bible Society Australia. ISBN 978-0647519837.
- McGahan, Anna (2020). Skin: A Book of Blessings for the Woman Learning to Bear Life. Anna McGahan. ISBN 978-0646830582.
- McGahan, Anna (20 June 2023). Immaculate. Allen and Unwin. ISBN 978-1761067990.

== Filmography ==
=== Film ===
Year	Title	Role	Notes
2009	Bipolar	Mopsy	Short film
2009	Maligayang Pasko		Short film
2010	Lance Johnson in Person	Abby	Short film
2011	A Little Bit Behind	Jen	Short film
2012	Undertow	Newlywed	TV movie
2012	100 Bloody Acres	Sophie	Feature film
2012	The Mystery of a Hansom Cab	Rosanna Moore / The Queen	TV film
2012	Reef 'n' Beef	Daisy	
2012	Scratch	Lola	Short film
2012	Gingers	Ginge	Short film (also writer)
2016	Spirit of the Game	Elspeth	Feature film
2016	Trolley	Anna	Short film
2017	Project Eden: Vol. I	Alice Lawson	Feature film
2017	The Doctor Blake Mysteries: Family Portrait	Rose Anderson	TV film
2018	Fur Baby	Colette	Short film (also writer)
2020	Liquid Moonlight	Erin Buchanan	Short film (also writer)
2021	Julia	Radio Presenter	Short film
2021	Sunshine	Roseanne	Short film
2022	Sit. Stay. Love.	Remy	TV film
2025	One More Shot	Flick	

=== Television ===
Year	Title	Role	Notes
2011	Rescue: Special Ops	Tegan Reid	Episode: "It's Not the Fall that Kills You"
2011	Spirited	Penelope (guest role)	Season 2
2011	Underbelly: Razor	Nellie Cameron (main role)	
2011	The Boys' Place	Jane Alexander	
2012	Miss Fisher's Murder Mysteries	Miss Prout	Episode: "Away with the Fairies"
2012–2014	House Husbands	Lucy Crabb (main role)	Seasons 1–3
2014	ANZAC Girls	Sister Olive Haynes	Miniseries
2016	The Kettering Incident	Gillian Baxter / Dr. Colleen McKay	Episode: "The Homecoming"
2016	Fancy Boy	Karen / Rachel	Episodes: "1.2", "1.3"
2016–2017	The Doctor Blake Mysteries	Rose Anderson (main role)	Seasons 4–5
2018	Picnic at Hanging Rock	Greta McCraw	Miniseries
2019	Glitch	Millie	1 episode
2022	Troppo	Frankie	2 episodes
2022	Joe vs. Carole	Mia	Miniseries, 1 episode
2022–2025	Darby and Joan	Rebecca Kirkhope	7 episodes
2023	In Our Blood	Michelle	Miniseries, 4 episodes

== Theatre ==
Year	Title	Role	Notes
2011	Julius Caesar	Portia	Roundhouse Theatre, Brisbane with La Boite Theatre Company
2012	Managing Carmen	Clara Salope	Playhouse, QPAC with QTC, Heath Ledger Theatre, Perth with Black Swan Theatre Company
2014	The Effect	Connie	Bille Brown Theatre, Brisbane with QTC / STC
2019	Hydra	Charmian	Dunstan Playhouse, Bille Brown Theatre, Brisbane with QTC, Wharf Theatre, Sydney with STC
2021–2022	The Taming of the Shrew	Katharina	Bille Brown Theatre, Brisbane, Riverside Theatres Parramatta, Inlet Cinema, Sussex Inlet, Belgrave Cinema, Armidale, Majestic Cinemas, Huskisson Pictures with QTC
2024	Closer	Anna	Roundhouse Theatre with La Boite Theatre Company

== Awards and nominations ==
Year	Title	Award	Category	Result
2009		Queensland Theatre Company	Young Playwright's Award	Won
2010		Queensland Theatre Company	Young Playwright's Award	Won
2011	He's Seeing Other People Now	Queensland Theatre Company	Queensland Premier’s Drama Award	Shortlisted
2011		Inside Film Awards	Out of the Box Award	Won
2012	Underbelly: Razor	TV Week Logie Awards	Most Popular New Female Talent	Nominated
2012	Underbelly: Razor	TV Week Logie Awards	Graham Kennedy Award for Most Outstanding New Talent	Nominated
2012	Various	Australians in Film	Heath Ledger Scholarship	Won
2012	La Boite’s Julius Caesar	Matilda Awards	Best Emerging Artist	Won
2016	Brightness	The Saturday Paper's Horne Prize	National Essay Award	Shortlisted
2020	Metanoia : Memoir of a Body, Born Again	Australian Christian Book of the Year Awards	Australian Christian Book of the Year	Shortlisted
2023	Immaculate	The Australian	Vogel National Literary Award	Won
2024	Immaculate	Adelaide Writers' Week	MUD Literary Prize	Shortlisted
