= List of Australian television series premieres in 2010 =

This is a list of Australian domestic television series that debuted in 2010.

== Premieres ==
=== Free-to-air television ===
| Program | Network | Debut date | Reference/s |
|---|---|---|---|
| Gourmet Farmer | SBS One | 7 January | |
| My Kitchen Rules | Seven Network | 1 February | |
| ICU | Seven Network | 3 February | |
| The Circle | Network Ten | 9 February | |
| World Football News | One | 10 February | |
| Poh's Kitchen | ABC1 | 10 February | |
| The White Room (Note: The White Room was axed after two episodes.) | Seven Network | 11 February | |
| Sleuth 101 | ABC1 | 12 February | |
| Art Nation | ABC1 | 14 February | |
| Yarramundi Kids | NITV | 15 February | |
| Good Game: Spawn Point | ABC3 | 20 February | |
| William & Sparkles' Magical Tales | Nine Network | 5 March | |
| Italian Food Safari | SBS One | 18 March | |
| The Bounce | Seven Network | 24 March (Note: The Bounce premiered on 24 March in Melbourne, Adelaide and Perth (the "AFL states"), and on 25 March in Sydney and Brisbane.) | |
| The Matty Johns Show | Seven Network | 25 March (Note: The Matty Johns Show premiered on 25 March in Sydney and Brisbane (the "NRL states"), and on and on 25 March in Melbourne, Adelaide and Perth.) | |
| Dead Gorgeous | ABC1 | 5 April | |
| Australian Families of Crime | Nine Network | 19 April | |
| Lowdown | ABC1 | 21 April | |
| I Rock | ABC2 | 3 May | |
| Dance Academy | ABC1 | 31 May | |
| Giggle and Hoot | ABC2 | Early 2010 | |
| The Wiggly Waffle | ABC2 | Early 2010 | |
| Minute to Win It | Seven Network | 22 June | |
| The Making of Modern Australia | ABC1 | 22 July | |
| Letters and Numbers | SBS One | 2 August | |
| Cops L.A.C. | Nine Network | 2 September | |
| Junior MasterChef Australia | Network Ten | 12 September | |
| Beat the Star | Seven Network | 12 September | |
| The Real Hustle (Note: The Real Hustle was formerly known as Scammers during production.) | Nine Network | 14 September | |
| The Boss is Coming to Dinner | Nine Network | 22 September | |
| Strictly Speaking | ABC1 | 29 September | |
| Spit It Out | Seven Network | 4 October | |
| Toybox | Seven Network | 14 October | |
| Keeping up with the Joneses | Network Ten | 14 October | |
| Undercover Boss Australia | Network Ten | 18 October | |
| Damage Control | Seven Network | 20 October | |
| Saturday Kerri-Anne | Nine Network | Aired | |
| Vancouver Gold | Nine Network | Aired | |
| Rake | ABC1 | 4 November | |
| Family Confidential | ABC1 | 15 November | |
| Making Australia Happy | ABC1 | 15 November | |
| Wakkaville | Nine Network | Aired | |
| Arranged Marriage | Nine Network | Still to debut | |
| Art and Soul | ABC1 | Still to debut | |
| Big Trouble in Tourist Thailand | Nine Network | Still to debut | |
| Bruce | ABC Television | Still to debut | |
| Extraordinary Stories | Nine Network | Still to debut | |
| FAQ | Nine Network | Still to debut | |
| The Family | SBS One | Still to debut | |
| Like a Virgin | ABC1 | Still to debut | |
| Lost for Words | ABC1 | Still to debut | |
| Making Music | ABC1 | Still to debut | |
| My Perfect Partner | Nine Network | Still to debut | |
| Next of Kin | ABC Television | Still to debut | |
| Next Door Nightmares | Nine Network | Still to debut | |
| Shadowplay | ABC1 | Still to debut | |
| Surprising Facts About Food | Nine Network | Still to debut | |
| TwentySomething | ABC Television | Still to debut | |
| The Ultimate Countdown | Seven Network | Still to debut | |
| You're Nicked | Nine Network | Still to debut | |

=== Subscription television ===
| Program | Network | Debut date | Reference/s |
|---|---|---|---|
| Come Dine with Me Australia | The LifeStyle Channel | 18 January | |
| The Best Job In The World | Nat Geo Adventure | 13 May | |
| Matthew Hayden's Home Ground | The LifeStyle Channel | 6 June | |
| Spirited | W. | 25 August | |
| Killing Time | TV1 | Still to debut | |
| Warship | TBA | Still to debut | |
| Jimeoin: Over the Top | The Comedy Channel | Still to debut | |

== Additional ==
- Ghozt Crew — Australian paranormal documentary series.
