= The Matty Johns Show =

Australian variety television series

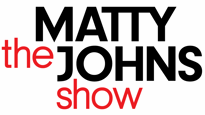
- Genre: Variety/Sports
- Presented by: Matthew Johns; Shane Webcke; Chloe Maxwell; Jason Stevens
- Country of origin: Australia
- Original language: English
- No. of seasons: 1

Production
- Production locations: Eveleigh, Sydney
- Camera setup: Multi-camera
- Running time: 60 minutes (including commercials)

Original release
- Network: Seven Network
- Release: 25 March – 23 September 2010

Related
- The Footy Show; The Bounce

The Matty Johns Show was an Australian variety television show largely focused on the National Rugby League (NRL) competition, starring former professional rugby league footballer Matthew "Matty" Johns. It first aired in 2010 on Thursdays at 7.30 pm in New South Wales and Queensland, on the Seven Network. The show usually ran for 1 hour. It was produced by Matty Johns and John Singleton.

The show's rugby league content was directly comparable to The Footy Show, produced by the Nine Network, which has been on air since 1994. The Matty Johns Show was described as a "smut-free", more family-friendly version of it. The Matty Johns Show also featured interviews, music and character-based skits. Portions of it were co-hosted by Shane Webcke, Jason Stevens and Chloe Maxwell. The house band, Aston, gained attention for their arrangements of popular music, using classical instruments.

The show's first season in 2010 rated strongly, and was compared favorably to The Footy Show by critics. It had been criticised for lacking serious football analysis, but had also been praised for its typically Australian character-based sketches. The Controversy Corner segment of the show was briefly spun off as a standalone Sunday morning program during the 2010 NRL finals.

The Matty Johns Show did not return in 2011.

== History ==
Matty Johns was a professional rugby league player from 1991 to 2002. He played for nine seasons with the Newcastle Knights, during which he and the Knights won the 1997 ARL season. He then played one season each with the Wigan Warriors and the Cronulla-Sutherland Sharks. During his career, he played in the State of Origin series for New South Wales four times, played international tests for Australia eight times, and was part of the Australian squad that won the 1995 Rugby League World Cup.

He made his first forays into entertainment in 1999, appearing in the low-budget film In Search of the Holy Grail, which screened at the Newcastle Film Festival. He played Reg Reagan, a stereotype of Australian rugby league players.

=== The Footy Show ===
In 2002, after his retirement from professional rugby league, Matty Johns became a regular performer on The Footy Show. The Footy Show is a popular variety show based on the NRL competition and broadcast by the Nine Network in those states where rugby league is the dominant football code (New South Wales and Queensland). It should not be confused with the identically named The Footy Show based on Australian rules football, which is targeted at the other states of Australia where Australian rules is dominant.

Johns was a popular member of the cast of The Footy Show, and played several characters for the show. He further developed the Reg Reagan character as a beer-swilling rugby league fan, and the character became hugely popular. He also appeared as Trent, a gay flight attendant. In 2004, Johns recorded a novelty song and wrote a book, This Is My Life in character as Reg Reagan, and produced a DVD featuring both characters. He also commentated on Nine's telecasts of rugby league games. In 2008, he wrote a second book, From the Sheds, under his own name. He also became assistant coach of the Melbourne Storm NRL team.

However, in 2009, Johns was suspended by the Nine Network over a sex scandal. It emerged in 2009 that Johns had participated in group sex with several Cronulla players and a young woman seven years earlier, in 2002, at a hotel in Christchurch, New Zealand. She claimed to Australian current affairs program Four Corners in 2009 that she had suffered psychological problems as a result.

Matty Johns and the other players were investigated by police and cleared of any criminal wrongdoing. In May 2009, Johns appeared on the Nine Network's A Current Affair program to explain his role in the event. He admitted having sex with the young woman, but claimed that it was consensual. He was later described as appearing during this interview like a "broken-down wreck". Johns later said that he "disconnected" for a month after his suspension. He stated that his wife and family experienced "great pain" in the midst of the publicity. He said, "It took us a long time to get over it. It pains me they have to go through it again." There was speculation that his media career was over.

During his month off, the Newcastle Knights approached him about coaching their team. He was later approached by Laurie Daley to become an assistant coach to the Country Rugby League side in the City vs Country Origin series. In August 2009, the Nine Network approached him about returning to commentary duties, reportedly offering $600,000 a year for him to continue with Nine. However, Johns turned down all of these offers and instead began a collaboration with Australian media stalwart John Singleton.

=== John Singleton ===
John Singleton is an Australian media entrepreneur, a rugby league fan and former part owner of the Brisbane Broncos. Johns and Singleton founded a television production company in November 2009, in which each owns a 50% stake. They developed a show to rival The Footy Show, and it was pursued by both the Seven Network and Network Ten. The Seven Network signed the new show and aggressively promoted it, even before it had a name.

Johns was under an exclusive contract with the company until 2011, and was forbidden to appear on any other electronic media without Singleton's approval. According to Paul Kent of The Daily Telegraph, the deal with Singleton and Seven "has the potential to make him wealthy far beyond anything he could have achieved had he remained at Nine."

=== Recruitment of on-air talent ===
Matty Johns asked former professional rugby league footballer Shane Webcke to be his co-host. Webcke played prop for the Brisbane Broncos from 1995 to 2006. He also played State of Origin for Queensland 21 times, played international tests for Australia 20 times, and was part of the Australian squad that won the 2000 Rugby League World Cup. After retiring at the end of the 2006 NRL season, Webcke joined the Seven Network, providing rugby league commentary and reading the sports bulletin on its Brisbane news bulletin. Webcke was initially hesitant before he accepted the offer to co-host The Matty Johns Show, and said at the time:

"I was pretty thorough in terms of going and seeing Matt and seeing what they had in mind; the actual guts of the show, what they were going to be about and that it was definitely something new...I wanted to make sure that we were trying to do something that was rugby league, that was different and that I just liked the feel of."

It was reported that Johns also pursued former professional rugby league footballer Mario Fenech, who appears on The Footy Show, and that Fenech declined the offer to join the new show. Matt Nable, former professional rugby league footballer turned screenwriter, worked as a writer on the show.

=== Premiere ===
The first episode of The Matty Johns Show aired Thursday evening, 25 March 2010, three weeks into the NRL season. It was Johns' first television appearance since appearing on A Current Affair in relation to the sex scandal. The Australian Associated Press reported that Matty Johns' performance on his first show was "impressive", and that he appeared "nervous but cheerful". The Daily Telegraph's Phil Rothfield compared the "far brighter and more radiant" appearance of Johns in his first show to the "broken down wreck" seen on A Current Affair in May 2009 in the context of the sex scandal.

=== Future ===
Towards the end of the 2010 season, Matty Johns said, "I've been really happy with what we've done - particularly the mix at the back end of the year." The show was slated to return in 2011, as the show was initially contracted for two years.

Seven offered Johns the 10.30pm Thursday timeslot, which Johns had the option of declining owing to a clause in his contract. Co-host Webcke was not happy with the late time, and Johns' producers perceived that there may be difficulty in booking guests at that time. Consequently, Johns declined the offer and sat out 2011 on full pay. It has also been suggested that success of The Matty Johns Show depended on the success of related AFL show The Bounce, which failed in 2010. The future of The Matty Johns Show is currently unclear.

=== Related projects ===
Johns discussed the possibility of new projects with the Seven Network during 2010. He also developed two sitcoms, which are being shopped to the major commercial networks.

The popular Controversy Corner segment was spun off into a Sunday morning one-hour program during the 2010 NRL finals series. There was also a "Daily Telegraph edition" of Controversy Corner in the week before the 2010 NRL Grand Final. Starting in the summer of 2010, co-host Jason Stevens began hosting a variety program on 7Two called Big J's Place.

== Style ==
The Matty Johns Show was pitched as a family-friendly variety show based on the National Rugby League (NRL) competition. It is primarily aimed at New South Wales and Queensland audiences (in which NRL is the dominant football code). The show features many comedy sketches, recurring characters and celebrity interviews in a variety format. This mixture has resulted in criticism from some media observers for a perceived lack of serious football analysis. Sports website The Roar notes that the show appears to be made to slick (and expensive) production values.

=== Comparison with The Footy Show ===
The Footy Show is a variety show based on the National Rugby League (NRL) competition, broadcast weekly by the Nine Network. The rugby league component of The Matty Johns Show is directly comparable to The Footy Show, and The Matty Johns Show has been described as a "smut-free" version of it. Being on the Seven Network, The Matty Johns Show cannot incorporate NRL footage (the rights to which are currently held by the Nine Network, and put to use on The Footy Show). The Matty Johns Show is not sanctioned by the NRL, while The Footy Show is.

The main cast of The Matty Johns Show was initially not invited to the 2010 Dally M Awards night (an annual ceremony to honour the best NRL players of the year), while the cast of The Footy Show was invited. Johns said of the snub, "...with the politics going around and with the rights coming up, and with Seven being an integral part of the NRL getting the money they are after, it's a little surprising that Seven weren't extended an invitation." Matty Johns and his team were belatedly invited. Johns reacted to the incident by appearing at the awards night in character as Harry Hardman, and attempting to interview Footy Show regulars for his program, in spite of the fact that they were contractually forbidden from appearing on his show.

=== Comparison with other shows ===
The Matty Johns Show has also been compared to The Bounce, which was a show based on the Australian Football League (AFL) and targeted at those states in which AFL predominates. Johns plays a range of recurring Australian characters, in a style that has drawn comparisons to comic Paul Hogan, star of The Paul Hogan Show. The variety elements of the show have inspired comparisons with Hey Hey It's Saturday. The set has been compared to that of Rove Live, a variety show formerly produced at Global Television.

== Format ==
The show was produced during the 2010 NRL season (corresponding to winter in the Southern Hemisphere). In New South Wales and Queensland, (in which NRL is the dominant football code), The Matty Johns Show was broadcast on Thursdays at 7.30 pm, two hours before The Footy Show. In all other states (in which the Australian Football League predominates), The Matty Johns Show may have been broadcast Thursdays at 7.30 pm, or broadcast around midnight, after The AFL Footy Show. When broadcast at 7.30 pm, the show followed long-running soap opera Home and Away.

It was pre-taped the day of broadcast, and usually ran for 60 minutes (including commercials). Once, the running time was extended in order to provide coverage of important rugby league news, such as the Melbourne Storm salary cap scandal. The show was recorded at Global Television studios in Eveleigh, Sydney. However, it has recorded one episode in South Bank Parklands, Brisbane. The 2010 Grand Final episode was recorded at the Overseas Passenger Terminal of Sydney Harbour.

=== Hosts ===
The show is hosted by Matty Johns and Shane Webcke. In a tongue-in-cheek review, satirical website The Un-Australian describes Johns as "a buffoonish, quintissentially (sic) Australian sportsperson spouting blokeisms", and describes co-host Shane Webcke as "surprisingly articulate".

Also featured are Jason Stevens and Chloe Maxwell. Stevens is a former prop for the St. George Dragons and Cronulla-Sutherland Sharks rugby teams, known for his Christian faith and clean image. Chloe Maxwell is a model, best known for her appearance in a series of advertisements for Jeans West. She is the wife of rugby player Mat Rogers. Sonia Kruger has also co-hosted.

=== Guests ===
The guests on the show are a mix of rugby league identities and entertainment figures. For example, on the 19 August 2010 episode, Sydney Roosters player Anthony Minichiello appeared alongside Hollywood stars Will Ferrell and Mark Wahlberg.

=== House band ===
The house band is Aston, a group of six young music students from the Sydney Conservatorium of Music. Their style is to "take contemporary hits and classics and re-arrange them into classical form", using classical instruments. In April 2010 they posted a classical version of the song "Telephone" by Lady Gaga, released on YouTube. The video caught the attention of blogger Perez Hilton, and became the most watched Australian music video of the year with 700,000 views in two weeks. Aston have recorded their first album, and it is expected to be released shortly by Warner Music Australia.

=== Segments ===
Matty Johns and Shane Webcke discuss rugby league news.

Controversy Corner is a segment in which Johns and Webcke, along with guest Paul Kent (a sports writer from Sydney's Daily Telegraph) discuss NRL news. They are usually joined by rugby league personalities. Controversy Corner is a revival of a segment originated by Rex Mossop on the Seven Network. Johns hosted a weekly Sunday morning one-hour version of Controversy Corner during the 2010 NRL finals. Branded as Matty Johns' Controversy Corner, it ran Sundays from 12 September to 3 October 2010 at 10am. In New South Wales and Queensland it was broadcast on Seven, and in other markets it was broadcast on 7Two. Johns also hosted a short "Daily Telegraph edition" of Controversy Corner in the week before the 2010 NRL Grand Final, featuring Jason Stevens, Paul Kent and Steve "Blocker" Roach. This video was streamed online on the Daily Telegraph website, and transcribed for the print and online versions of the newspaper.

Home When You're Away is a segment in which two rugby league players from the same team (usually from a team scheduled to play "away" from their home ground in the next match) visit the home of one of their supporters. The person whose home is featured then answers questions.

=== Characters ===
Don Kirk is a parody of Australian gardening expert Don Burke. He is shown as being accident prone, arrogant and ignorant. Alby Sandals is a parody of Alby Mangels, a Dutch-Australian adventurer and documentary-maker. He travels around visiting rugby-supporting towns with his pet chihuahua, Alan. Sandals usually runs into a battle with the town's team mascot. Steven the Man Child is portrayed as a 10-year-old child, who is inexplicably mature for his age, playing rugby league. He has a monobrow and is mute. Harry Hardman is a "garbo" (rubbish collector) who vents his frustrations with the game of rugby league. While in character as Hardman, Matty Johns "ambushed" The Footy Show regulars at the 2010 Dally M Awards.

== Reception ==
=== First shows ===
Reviews of the debut show were mixed. Despite this, the first episode of The Matty Johns Show was that day's most-watched program in Sydney with 396,000 viewers, and it collected another 199,000 viewers in Brisbane. Of the initial ratings, Johns said in a press statement, "We’re humbled by the support for our show... Our aim was to produce a great fun footy show for the whole family and we’re glad people liked it." Reporters Amanda Meade from The Australian and Michael Idato from The Sydney Morning Herald suggested after the first episode that the earlier timeslot gives The Matty Johns Show a ratings advantage over The Footy Show. The Daily Telegraph's Phil Rothfield stated that the first show put "pressure" on Paul Vautin, host of The Footy Show.

Both The Matty Johns Show and The Footy Show had improved ratings the following Thursday, after news broke of the Melbourne Storm salary cap scandal earlier that day.

=== First series ===
The show continued to rate well throughout 2010. In mid-July, an unnamed Seven spokesperson stated, "Matthew has destroyed The Footy Show in Sydney and Brisbane. That's what counts." The first series faced stiff competition from the very popular MasterChef Australia, which aired on Network Ten in the same timeslot as The Matty Johns Show. After MasterChef ended, The Matty Johns Show's ratings rose 25% over the previous week, which Seven's head of programming conceded was probably due to the end of MasterChef.

== See also ==
- List of Australian television series premieres in 2010
- List of programs broadcast by Seven Network
- List of Australian television series
