= Widdows =

Widdows is a surname. Notable people with the surname include:

- Christopher Widdows (born 1968), Australian comedian and actor with cerebral palsy, known under the stage name "Steady Eddy"
- Connor Widdows (born 1992), Canadian actor
- George H. Widdows (1871–1946), English architect
- Robin Widdows (born 1942), British former racing driver

== See also ==
- Widdoes
- Widows
