= Widdoes =

Widdoes is a surname. Notable people with the surname include:

- Carroll Widdoes (20th century), American football coach and athletics administrator
- James Widdoes (born 1953), American actor and director
- Kathleen Widdoes (born 1939), American actress

== See also ==
- Widdows
- Widows
