= 30 Seconds (TV series) =

- Intertitle for 30 Seconds
- Also known as: 30 Seconds
- Genre: Comedy
- Created by: Tim Bullock; Justin Drape; Scott Nowell
- Written by: Tim Bullock; Justin Drape; Scott Nowell; Andrew Knight
- Directed by: Shawn Seet
- Starring: Peter O'Brien; Joel Tobeck; Gyton Grantley; Stephen Curry; Jenna Lind
- Country of origin: Australia
- Original language: English
- No. of seasons: 1
- No. of episodes: 6

Production
- Executive producer: Andrew Denton (Zapruder’s Other Films)
- Running time: 30 minutes (including commercials)

Original release
- Network: The Comedy Channel
- Release: 7 September – 12 October 2009

:30 Seconds is an Australian comedy series produced for The Comedy Channel which satirises Australian advertising companies and advertising industry. The name of the show comes from the advertising slots on television that are normally 30 seconds long. The show has had many guest appearances from famous Australians such as Claudia Karvan, Peter Helliar, Bridie Carter, Matthew Newton and Guy Pearce.

== Plot ==
The show revolves around a fictitious advertising agency, BND which is a global advertising network, with 61 offices worldwide. The show takes place in one of the Australian offices.

== Production ==
=== Location ===
The show was shot on location at the offices of real-life Sydney production company Blacksheep Productions, located in Mountain Street, Ultimo.

=== Lazzi ===
:30 Seconds occasionally has parts closely resembling a lazzi. This occurs sporadically throughout the show when Martin Manning sees a product. The product that Martin sees becomes centerpiece, while a culmination of the product in Martin's eyes, and how the product could be advertised. For example, the first use in the show occurs in the first scene, when Martin first looks at an Orange Juice container. Suddenly the packet animates and a stereotypical advertising voice over sounds saying: "Now with added goodatives". The scene returns to normal after this brief lazzi, and the scene continues on.

== Cast ==
=== Main / regular ===
- Joel Tobeck as Martin Manning
- Stephen Curry as McBaney
- Gyton Grantley as Sumo
- Kat Stewart as Marion West
- Peter O'Brien as Bill Brooker
- Jenna Lind as Kath Bullock
- Emily Brennan as Barbara Main
- Oliver Brookes as Joel

=== Guests ===
- Caroline Brazier as Kirsty (1 episode)
- Helen Thomson as Faith O'Callaghan (1 episode)
- John Batchelor as Bobo (1 episode)
- Lucy Bell as Amanda Walls (1 episode)
- Penne Hackforth-Jones as Pat Evans (1 episode)
- Tory Mussett as Anna

== Episodes ==
No.	Title	Original release date	Viewers (thousands) (Note: Ratings are the overall national viewers; numbers in brackets indicate weekly ratings position for Australian subscription television rankings.)
1	"Drink Rexponsibly"	7 September 2009	38 (20th)
2	"Be The Tool"	14 September 2009	N/A
BND's masculinity is put to the test when briefed on two campaigns, however the largely male creative department is having trouble penetrating anything as Martin and Sumo wrestle over a female staff member.
3	"Good Clown Bad Clown"	21 September 2009	N/A
Bob's Burgers are worried about a new government report linking fast food and childhood obesity. BND's ingenious response hits problems when the Bobo Clown clashes with effeminate Cuban burger stylist Raoul.
4	"Invisible Fault Lines"	28 September 2009	N/A
At 25, Sophie Marsh, the face of Láfinité Rejuvenale is too old. BND need to find a new model and a new campaign for the famous anti-ageing brand.
5	"Twenty One Today"	5 October 2009	N/A
Martin's career flashes before his eyes as he plummets from 3rd to 21st in the Campaign Brief creative rankings, while Daiyonda are in a spin as their cars are voted 'worst on emissions'
6	"A Matter of Trust"	12 October 2009	N/A
A new business prospect presents a conflict of interest between a prospective client and BND's founding client; Brooker has big plans for the agency while Martin wrestles with a large overseas job offer.

== See also ==
- List of Australian television series
