= Orange Is the New Brown =

Australian sketch comedy series

- Genre: Comedy
- Starring: Nazeem Hussain; Urzila Carlson; Becky Lucas; Matt Okine; Broden Kelly
- Country of origin: Australia
- Original language: English
- No. of seasons: 1
- No. of episodes: 6

Production
- Running time: 30 minutes
- Production company: Screentime

Original release
- Network: Seven Network
- Release: 8 November 2018 – present

Orange is the New Brown is an Australian sketch comedy television series on the Seven Network.

Orange is the New Brown is written by Nazeem Hussain, Joel Slack Smith, Sophie Braham, Richard Thorp, Penny Greenhalgh and Heidi Regan. It is produced by Screentime.

== Cast ==
- Nazeem Hussain
- Urzila Carlson
- Becky Lucas
- Matt Okine
- Broden Kelly
- Aaron Chen

== Guests ==
- Kat Stewart
- Claudia Karvan
- Tim Minchin
- Gary Sweet
- Firass Dirani
- Sigrid Thornton
- Gyton Grantley as Bush Bros / Whatsisname / Competitive Dad
