= Supernova (British TV series) =

British comedy television programme

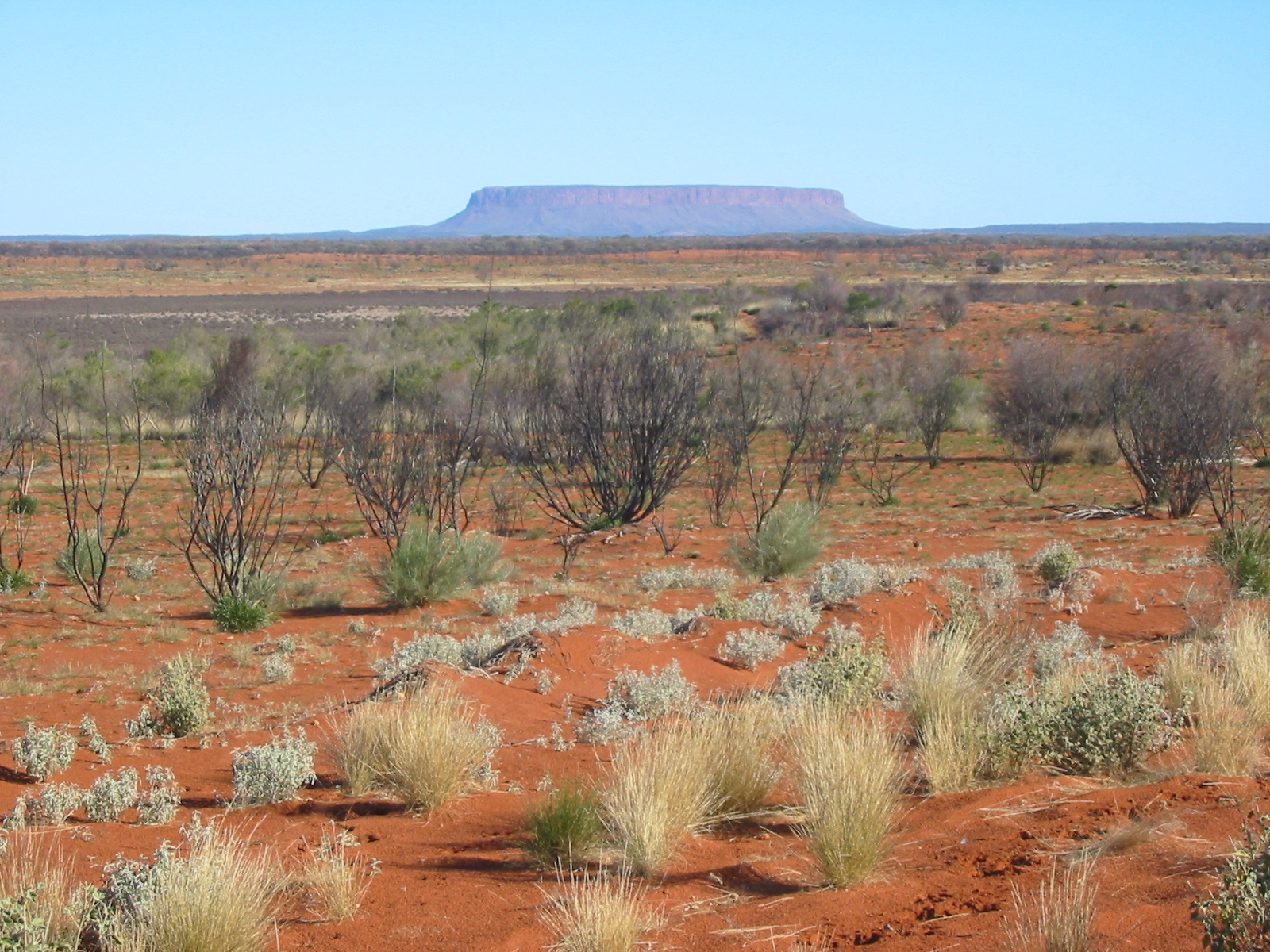
- Created by: Harry Cripps; Matt Lipsey
- Starring: Rob Brydon; Kat Stewart; Damon Hunter
- Countries of origin: United Kingdom; Australia
- No. of series: 2
- No. of episodes: 12

Production
- Producer: Sue Vertue
- Running time: approx. 30 minutes (per episode)
- Production company: Hartswood Films

Original release
- Network: BBC Two
- Release: 20 October 2005 – 7 September 2006

Supernova is a British comedy television programme produced by Hartswood Films and jointly commissioned by the BBC in the UK and UKTV in Australia. It follows Dr Paul Hamilton (Rob Brydon), a Welsh astronomer, who leaves a dull academic post and unloved girlfriend for a new job at the Royal Australian Observatory, deep in the Australian outback. The comedy centres on his difficulties adjusting to life in the outback and his eccentric fellow astronomers. The first series was released in the United Kingdom and Australia in October 2005 and consisted of six 30-minute episodes. The second series began airing on 3 August 2006 in the UK.

The exterior scenes were shot at Broken Hill in New South Wales, Australia. The observatory itself is a CGI creation, according to the DVD commentary, and only a partial doorway was constructed on site for filming purposes.

== Plot ==
During the series, Paul grapples with, amongst others, his attraction to his colleague Dr Rachel Mann (who is engaged to an astronaut), the arrival of his girlfriend at the observatory, and a bout of fatalism that comes on when he creates a simulation of how the universe will end.

== Cast ==
=== Main ===
- Rob Brydon as Dr Paul Hamilton
- Hollie Andrew as Dr Jude Wardlaw
- Tim Draxl as Professor Mike French
- Damion Hunter as Bill
- Marlene Cummins as Bill's mum
- Peter Kowitz as Max Talbot
- Kris McQuade as Professor Pip Cartwright
- Kat Stewart as Dr Rachel Mann

=== Recurring ===
- Deborah Thomson as Ruth
- Morgan O'Neill as Chad
- Jessica Brooks as Brooke Richardson
- Gyton Grantley as Jeff

== Crew ==
- Harry Cripps - Writer
- Matt Lipsey - Director
- Theo Benton – Costume Designer

== Episode list ==
=== Series 1 (2005) ===
1. "The Black Holes"
2. "God, Are You Out There?"
3. "When You Wish Upon A Star"
4. "Venus Rising"
5. "Unity"
6. "Where Men Are Men"

=== Series 2 (2006) ===
1. "Wild Oats"
2. "How's Your Father?"
3. "Big Red"
4. "Perseverance"
5. "Something Wicked This Way Comes"
6. "May The Best Man Win"
