= Kat Stewart =

Australian actress (born 1972)

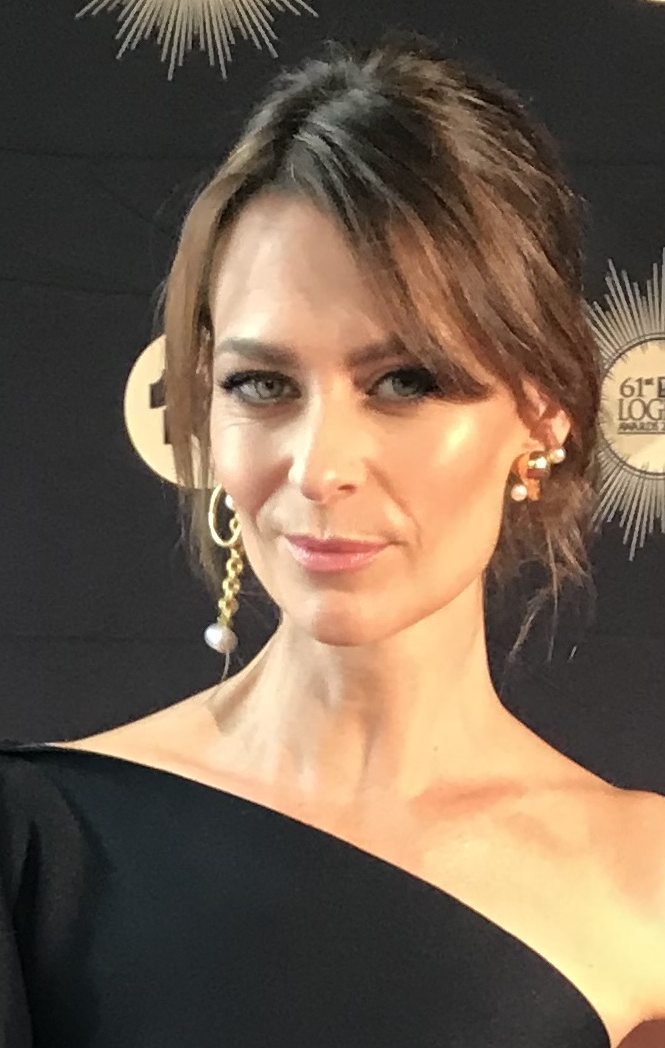
- Stewart at the Logie Awards, June 2019
- Born: Katherine Louise Stewart; 30 November 1972 (age 53); Bairnsdale, Victoria, Australia
- Occupation: Actress
- Years active: 1999–present
- Spouse: David Whiteley (m. 2008)
- Children: 2

Katherine Louise Stewart (born 30 November 1972), known professionally as Kat Stewart, is an Australian actress who has made numerous appearances in television series, movies and on-stage.

== Early life ==
Kat Stewart is the daughter of Tony and Kitty Stewart and was born and raised in Bairnsdale, Victoria. When she was eight years old she, her parents and two older brothers lived and travelled in Europe for a year and Stewart said that time "opened my eyes to the world and gave me a lot of confidence." Stewart began acting in primary school and remembers: "Since Year 2 I had been getting a thrill out of doing school drama. I was on the quiet side, but I felt light in my bones when I was onstage. At university I studied marketing and arts, and joined the theatre society, which quickly became my passion. After graduation, I worked in publicity, but I couldn't shake my love of acting, so I enrolled at the National Theatre, hoping I'd outgrow it. Now I understand you need to do what you love to be happy." Stewart decided to leave PR behind to pursue acting full-time and recalled: "After I finished drama school, I had a couple of acting gigs straightaway, but then I was unemployed fairly consistently over a couple of years. I don't take anything for granted now though, so it wasn't such a bad thing. But I wouldn't want to go back there if I can avoid it."

== Career ==
=== Television ===
Kat Stewart is best known for her role as Roberta Williams (wife of the late Melbourne gangland figure Carl Williams) in the first series of the Channel 9 TV production Underbelly and as Billie Proudman in the popular comedy/drama, Offspring on Network Ten.

It was her award-winning performance in Underbelly in 2008 that first made Stewart a household name. The portrayal of Roberta Williams drew praise from critics including Marcus Casey of The Daily Telegraph, who described it as 'one of the most compelling performances by an Australian actress in memory.' Casey expanded that it was 'a brutally brave, ugly and compelling performance...She held nothing back, and was an emotional but controlled and screeching tornado who dominated the screen whenever the camera peered her way.' The authenticity of Stewart's performance was praised by Michael Lallo in The Age, who said: "By any measure, it's the role of a lifetime. Stewart has ensured it's the standout performance of the series. Despite quality performances by all, critics say she owns every frame she's in. It's not that she delivers a superb depiction of a suburban gangster moll; it's that you really believe she is a suburban gangster moll." Although her performance was popular with critics and audiences, the real life Roberta was not a fan but Stewart was sympathetic, "Obviously, I would have preferred her to like it," she said. "But I can't control that. And if someone was playing me, I couldn't imagine I'd be happy…I have a lot of empathy for Roberta and what she's been through". Stewart acknowledges the show was a key moment in her career, "Underbelly opened a lot of doors and gave me access to better opportunities and more opportunities. I am very grateful for it". Despite her positive experience in Underbelly, Stewart chose not to reprise the role in Fat Tony & Co in 2014. Stewart told David Knox of 'TV Tonight': "..Seven years ago when I did it we didn’t know much about Roberta Williams. So I did as much research as I could...Now we know how she walks and talks and so much more about her...I don’t like turning down work. It goes against every actor instinct. But it just didn’t feel right".

After the success of Underbelly Stewart next appeared in the critically acclaimed relationship drama, Tangle (2009–2012) on Showcase. In the series Stewart played the loveable but flawed, Nat Manning alongside Justine Clarke, Ben Mendelsohn, Matt Day and Catherine McClements. Showing she has long been adroit at both drama and comedy, in 2009 Stewart appeared in the Andrew Denton produced, advertising industry satire :30 Seconds on Comedy Channel.

Stewart won many new fans in her role as Billie Proudman on Offspring, as part of an ensemble cast led by Asher Keddie and including John Waters, Eddie Perfect, Deborah Mailman, Richard Davies, Garry McDonald, Lachy Hulme and Linda Cropper. One of the show's strengths is the dynamic relationship between the sisters Billie and Nina Proudman (played by Keddie). Both actresses have spoken of their admiration for each other, with Stewart saying "I've admired Asher ever since Love My Way. She is an actress of extraordinary ability and depth. We have a lovely shorthand and support for each other on set, not unlike Nina and Billie. There's a trust there that allows real spontaneity and joy." Keddie spoke of Stewart, saying "It's exhilarating to perform with her; I feel genuinely excited by it. That's a great feeling to have as an actor - when you really want to be working opposite someone and with someone. It doesn't get much more rewarding than that." Stewart admits to being fond of her character, Billie, despite some heartaches, "I’m really fond of her, though she’s really frustrating sometimes. Though she cheated on Mick [in season four], it’s my job to see the world through her eyes. You see what happened in the lead-up and it was the ultimate act of self-destruction. It broke my heart." Offspring aired for 5 seasons from 2010 to 14 before returning to TV screens for a sixth season in 2016. With production of the new series underway Stewart spoke to Colin Vickery of News Corp, "I really didn’t think it would happen", Stewart said. "It was the best experience I’ve had in a show. You form such deep relationships with the people and also the characters. I feel really confident we’ll be able to deliver something great. I don’t think we’re going to coast on some sort of legacy. We’re really aware of that and all want it to be as fantastic and awesome as it can be. To get to walk around in Billie’s shoes again is fantastic". The seventh season of the show, including Stewart and other key cast members, screened in 2017. Writing in 'The Daily Telegraph', Colin Vickery reflected on season 7 with "this year...Billie, played by Kat Stewart, has had to endure a heartbreaking split with husband Mick (Eddie Perfect). Billie's rollercoaster life has showcased Stewart's comedic and dramatic talents like never before. No wonder many critics believe she is the best actor on Australian television."

Stewart teamed with Shaun Micallef in the murder mystery drama/comedy, Mr & Mrs Murder on Network Ten in 2013. The pair played Charlie and Nicola Buchanan, a husband and wife duo of industrial cleaners with an amateur interest in solving crimes. The two previously worked together on the satirical SBS newscast show Newstopia and both have spoken positively of their on-screen chemistry and rapport with Micallef saying "I wouldn't have considered doing this if Kat wasn't involved." Stewart also shared an Associate Producer credit on the show.

From 2019 to 2023 Stewart appeared in the Network Ten and Paramount+ housemates' drama Five Bedrooms co-starring with Stephen Peacocke, Hugh Sheridan, Kate Jenkinson, Doris Younane, Katie Robinson, Johnny Carr and Roy Joseph. In an interview with Debi Enker of The Sydney Morning Herald, Stewart said of her character in Five Bedrooms, "Liz is brave, but also fragile. I find her heart-breaking, but she can come off as a bit cold. I don’t think people will necessarily warm to her quickly. She’s complicated and I think that the older we get and the more that we’ve marched in the world with our armour, we don’t throw it off in a hurry. Liz’s got a lot of armour". Reflecting on the show itself Stewart commented, "It’s a challenge to make TV that’s fresh and of the time, because we’re competing with such brilliant overseas content. Going off the intelligence of the scripts, the heart and the humility and the humour, I feel like this is very much of the time. It feels fresh to me: it’s something I wanted to be a part of and something I would want to watch". In a review in The Sydney Morning Herald in 2022 Melinda Houston concluded: "Not to mince words, Five Bedrooms is one of the most criminally underrated shows on television right now....Fresh, relevant, smart, equal parts funny and heartbreaking, it’s an absolute delight."

2020 saw Kat Stewart appear as one of the featured celebrities in the 11th season of the Australian version of the television documentary reality genealogy series Who Do You Think You Are? on SBS.

In 2023 Stewart appeared in One Night on Paramount+, alongside a cast including Jodie Whittaker, Nicole da Silva and Yael Stone. In 2025 Stewart featured in a supporting role in the second series of the crime drama Black Snow starring Travis Fimmel on Stan.

In 2027 Stewart will appear in the ABC TV crime drama Fortitude Valley alongside Hunter Page-Lochard and Rupert Everett.

Stewart's other TV credits include guest appearances in the Nazeem Hussain sketch comedy series Orange Is the New Brown in 2018, True Story with Hamish & Andy on the Nine Network in 2017, No Activity on Stan in 2015, It's a Date and Jack Irish: Dead Point in 2014, Camp on America's NBC in 2013, Miss Fisher's Murder Mysteries in 2012, various roles in Newstopia on SBS in 2007–08, the BBC2/UKTV comedy series Supernova, as well as recurring roles on City Homicide, Kick, and Last Man Standing. Earlier in her career Stewart had guest roles on Blue Heelers, Stingers, CrashBurn, Something in the Air, The Secret Life of Us, and Fergus McPhail. In 2015, Stewart appeared with close friend and mentor Ailsa Piper in the contemporary interview program 'The Truth About Us' on Foxtel's Bio. channel.

=== Stage ===
Kat Stewart has won acclaim on-stage in a range of dramatic and comedic roles. As an ensemble member of Red Stitch Actors Theatre from 2002 to 2012 Stewart appeared in over a dozen plays for the company including The Little Dog Laughed, The Shape of Things, Rabbit Hole, Bug, Dirty Butterfly, Play About the Baby and Loyal Women. In 2010 she appeared in the part of Tekla in an update of August Strindberg's Creditors.

In 2014 Stewart featured in Melbourne Theatre Company's production of The Speechmaker. The political satire was the first play from Australian filmmakers Working Dog Productions and the writing trio of Santo Cilauro, Tom Gleisner and Rob Sitch. When asked about the production and returning to the stage after a four-year break Stewart said "I’ve always wanted to work with [producers and writers] Working Dog. The script is engaging, smart, alarming and funny. I used to do six or seven plays a year. But I think you can lose your nerve if you leave it too long." The play also featured Stewart's Offspring cast-mates, Lachy Hulme and Jane Harber. Stewart had previously worked with MTC on productions such as Festen in 2006 and 2008's Frost/Nixon. In August 2016 she had a starring role on stage in the MTC production of Ayad Akhtar's 2013 Pulitzer Prize winning play, Disgraced, earning critical praise in the part of Emily.

Stewart appeared in the 2019 Melbourne Theatre Company production of the Simon Stephens' penned romantic comedy, Heisenberg. The production was directed by Tom Healey and co-stars Peter Kowitz. Stewart earned praise in the role of Georgie with Andrew Fuhrmann of the Herald Sun saying, "This new MTC production is elegantly done, with a slow, almost meditative rhythm. And it features a wonderfully engrossing performance by Offspring star Kat Stewart." He further summarised, "... really, the best reason to see this production is Stewart's finely modulated performance. Her Georgie is both utterly untrustworthy and deeply sympathetic."

In 2022 Stewart returned to the stage in the Melbourne Theatre Company production of Joshua Harmon's education satire Admissions. The production was directed by Gary Abrahams and co-starred William McKenna, Heidi Arena, Simon Maiden and Deidre Rubenstein. Cameron Woodhead of The Age described Stewart's performance as '...the glossiest possible portrayal of liberal officiousness and the cynical abyss her wokeness teeters into when the chips are down.'

Stewart starred as Martha in three productions of Who's Afraid of Virginia Woolf?, alongside the same cast including real-life partner, David Whiteley, as well as Harvey Zielinski and Emily Goddard. In 2023 and 2024 the quartet appeared in Red Stitch Actors Theatre productions, including a season at the Comedy Theatre in Melbourne, and followed by a Sydney Theatre Company run at the Roslyn Packer Theatre in late 2025. John Shand of the Sydney Morning Herald and The Age put the Sydney production in his top 5 of 2025, saying of Stewart "This is a performance that will throb in the memory bank long after age has pilfered most of them. Stewart’s light-switch mood changes are scary enough; her Martha’s rage is cyclonic, her intellect formidable, her capacity for alcohol bottomless and the terror on her face near the end heartbreaking."

In 2026 Stewart appeared in Break of Day at Malthouse Theatre in Melbourne alongside Sherry-Lee Watson, Richard Piper and Theo Clarke, directed by Sarah Goodes and written by Steve Rodgers. The play received strong reviews, including Tim Byrne of the The Guardian: "Restraint is the organising principle for the cast, too; performances are made up of granular psychological details rather than grand gestures or histrionics. Stewart is superb, steely and devoted but cracked right through the middle, like someone concealing a mortal wound." Deborah Jones of The Australian said "Break of Day shines an unflinching light on working-class Australia, anchored by a tour de force performance from Kat Stewart." Stephen A Russell in Time Out said "We love Kat Stewart! We do! Savage River playwright Steve Rodgers has crafted a very specific character in the magnificent Stewart’s Pamela. One that’s all-too recognisable in our late capitalist death-spiral that purposefully crushes the human spirit.....But as strong as Pamela is on the page, with her pin-drop monologues about walking the estate in an outer city suburb somewhere in Australia, it’s Stewart who nails the bone weariness of Break of Day. As directed with urgent authority by Sarah Goodes, Stewart’s an empathy machine you can’t take your eyes or ears off."

=== Film ===
Stewart appeared in West of Sunshine, a movie directed by Jason Raftopoulos and released in Australian cinemas in 2018. The urban drama also stars Damian Hill, Ty Perham, Arthur Angel and Kaarin Fairfax.

In 2019 Stewart has a supporting role in Little Monsters. The zombie comedy horror film, written and directed by Abe Forsythe, premiered at the Sundance Film Festival in January 2019 and stars 2013 Oscar winner Lupita Nyong'o, Josh Gad, Stephen Peacocke and Nadia Townsend.

=== Radio and podcasts ===
In December 2020 Stewart co-hosted How Big is My Trailer, an interview series bringing together two well known Australians in a "revealing and open-hearted conversation hour about the highs, lows and left turns of navigating a truly successful life in film, television and the arts." Stewart co-hosted with interviewer/producer Angela Pulvirenti and each episode paired some of Australia's leading creative talents including George Miller with Tim Minchin, Asher Keddie with Daina Reid, Damon Herriman with Emma Freeman, Eric Bana with Trent Dalton, Eddie Perfect with Tina Arena. How Big is My Trailer is available as a podcast.

== Personal life ==
Stewart married fellow actor David Whiteley in Melbourne in February 2008. The couple met while working at Red Stitch Actors Theatre in 2002. Their first child, a boy named Archie Nicholas Whiteley, was born on 12 January 2012. The actors share parenting duties between work commitments, "The great thing about this profession is it’s a period of intense work but you have great breaks as well. We co-parent; it’s 100 per cent a team effort. We also have parents who are besotted with Archie," Stewart said in 2014.

Stewart and Whiteley had a second child, a daughter named Georgia Kitty Whiteley (known as Gigi) born on 16 March 2016.

Stewart's mother died of pancreatic cancer in 2015. "My mum, Kitty, was the ultimate mother: fiercely protective, sometimes overinvolved, incredibly hospitable, very self-deprecating and oh-so stylish...Losing her felt catastrophic, but I've gotten to a point now where I feel grateful for having her at all. Not everyone has that kind of relationship with their mum – I'm so lucky," Stewart confided to Alley Pascoe of Marie Claire in 2020. Stewart has a close relationship with her father, Tony, telling Jane Rocca of The Sydney Morning Herald in 2018, "Dad and I are very close and talk most days now. I admire and look up to him. He is the kind of person I wanted to be like because he represents the values I want to instil in my kids. He has strong self-belief and is a risk-taker and has always had a strong sense of what's right."

== Awards ==
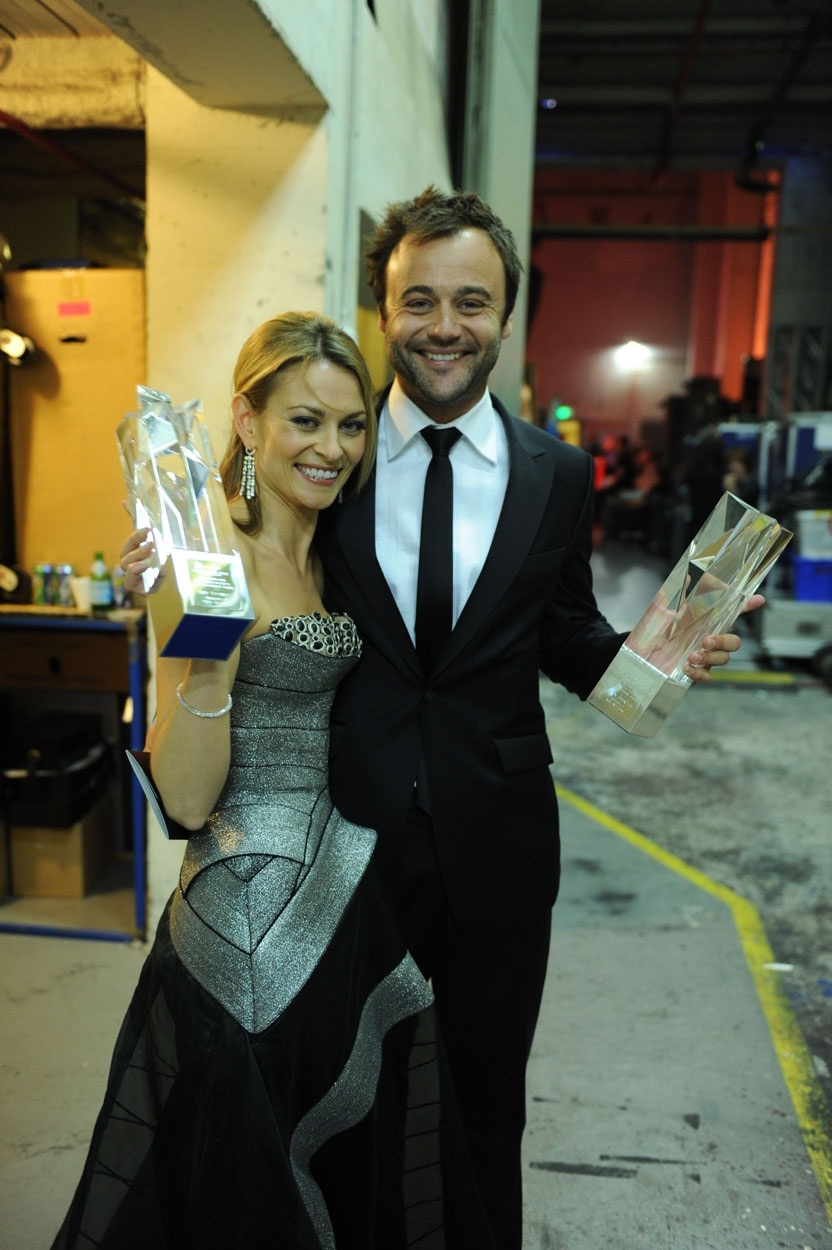
Stewart (with Gyton Grantley) at the AFI Awards, December 2008

Kat Stewart was nominated for the Graham Kennedy Award for Most Outstanding New Talent at the Logie Awards in 2006 and two ASTRA awards in 2006 and 2007 for her role in the comedy series Supernova. She won acclaim for her role as Roberta Williams in Underbelly, winning an AFI award for Best Lead Actress in a Television Drama and being nominated for two Logies in 2009, winning the Silver Logie for Most Outstanding Actress. In 2010 she was nominated again for the Silver Logie for Most Outstanding Actress, this time for Tangle, and an ASTRA award for :30 Seconds. Stewart was rewarded for her work as Billie Proudman in Offspring by winning Best Guest or Supporting Actress in a Television Drama at the 2014 AACTA Awards, a nomination for Best Lead Actress in a Television Drama at the 2015 AACTA Awards and nominations for the Silver Logie for Most Outstanding Actress in 2011, 2012 and again in 2014. The cast of Offspring were also acknowledged with nominations for the Equity Awards for Outstanding Performance by an Ensemble in a Drama Series for 5 years running from 2011 to 2015 and again in 2017. The cast of Five Bedrooms was nominated for the Equity Awards for Outstanding Performance by an Ensemble in a Drama Series in 2020.

For her theatrical work, Stewart has twice won and twice been nominated for Green Room Awards. In 2004, she won the Gerda Nicolson Award (for an Emerging Actress) and in 2006 won Best Actress for the Red Stitch productions Bug and The Shape of Things. She was nominated as Best Actress for her body of work in 2003 and again as Best Actress for the Red Stitch production of The Little Dog Laughed in 2008.

Stewart was part of the judging panel at the Tropfest Australia 2014 Short Film Festival. In 2014 Stewart also starred in the Matt Holcomb directed short film, Flat Daddy. The production was nominated for Best Short Fiction Film at the 2015 AACTA Awards.

Stewart was recognised for her performance as Martha in the Sydney Theatre Company production of Who's Afraid of Virginia Woolf? by winning the award for Best Performance in a Leading Role in a Mainstage Production at the 2025 Sydney Theatre Awards.

Year	Association	Award Category	Work	Result
2003	Green Room Awards	Best Actress	Body of work	Nominated
2004	Green Room Awards	Gerda Nicolson Award (for an Emerging Actress)	Body of work	Won
2006	Green Room Awards	Best Actress	Bug & The Shape of Things	Won
2006	ASTRA Awards	Most Outstanding Performance by an Actor - Female	Supernova	Nominated
2006	Logie Awards	Graham Kennedy Award for Most Outstanding New Talent	Supernova	Nominated
2007	ASTRA Awards	Most Outstanding Performance by an Actor - Female	Supernova	Nominated
2008	Green Room Awards	Best Actress	The Little Dog Laughed	Nominated
2008	AFI Awards	Best Lead Actress in a Television Drama	Underbelly	Won
2009	Logie Awards	Silver Logie for Most Outstanding Actress	Underbelly	Won
2009	Logie Awards	Silver Logie for Most Popular Actress	Underbelly	Nominated
2010	ASTRA Awards	Most Outstanding Performance by an Actor - Female	:30 Seconds	Nominated
2010	Logie Awards	Silver Logie for Most Outstanding Actress	Tangle	Nominated
2011	Logie Awards	Silver Logie for Most Outstanding Actress	Offspring	Nominated
2012	Logie Awards	Silver Logie for Most Outstanding Actress	Offspring	Nominated
2014	Logie Awards	Silver Logie for Most Outstanding Actress	Offspring	Nominated
2014	AACTA Awards	Best Guest or Supporting Actress in a Television Drama	Offspring	Won
2015	AACTA Awards	Best Lead Actress in a Television Drama	Offspring	Nominated
2025	Sydney Theatre Awards	Best Performance in a Leading Role in a Mainstage Production	Who's Afraid of Virginia Woolf?	Won

== Filmography ==
=== Television ===
Year	Title	Role	Notes
2001	The Secret Life of Us	Chiara	"State of Limbo"
2001	Something in the Air	Jenny Cliff	"Hooley Dooley"
2001	Stingers	Amanda	"Fool to Want You"
2001	Blue Heelers	Gail Watson	"The Blame Game: Parts 1 & 2"
2002	Blue Heelers	Liz Stewart	Recurring role
2002	Stingers	Sharine Sands	"Slow Hand, Easy Touch"
2003	CrashBurn	Mandy	"One Hundred Years of Solitude"
2004	Fergus McPhail	Director	"Goosebumps"
2005	Last Man Standing	Clare Tonitollo	Recurring role
2005–2006	Supernova	Dr. Rachel Mann	Main role
2007	Kick	Jan Pollock	Regular role
2007	City Homicide	Claire Jackson	Recurring role
2007–2008	Newstopia	Various	Regular role
2008	Underbelly	Roberta Williams	Main role
2009	:30 Seconds	Marion West	Main role
2009–2012	Tangle	Nat Manning	Regular role
2010–2017	Offspring	Billie Proudman	Main role
2011	The Bazura Project	Mary Spleen	Recurring role
2012	Miss Fisher's Murder Mysteries	Miss Leigh	"Raisins and Almonds"
2013	Mr & Mrs Murder	Nicola Buchanan	Main role
2013	Camp	Sunny Matthews	"Capture the Flag"
2014	It's a Date	Jen	"Do Set Up Dates Work?"
2015	No Activity	Tanya	"The Witness"
2016	Have You Been Paying Attention?	Herself	Guest Quiz Master
2017	True Story with Hamish & Andy	Tracy	"Tracy's Story"
2018	Orange Is the New Brown	Various	Guest performer
2019–2023	Five Bedrooms	Liz Wendell	32 episodes
2020	Who Do You Think You Are?	Herself	Season 11, Episode 6
2022	WTFitness	Helen	1 episode
2023	One Night	Vicki	4 episodes
2025	Black Snow	Julie Cosgrove	Season 2, Episode 5
2027	Fortitude Valley	Heather Briggs	6 episodes

=== Film ===
Year	Title	Role	Notes
1999	Huntsman 5.1	Cyber-Ella	
2001	Catch Her in the Eye	Mrs. Huckleby	Short film
2003	Yellow Brick Dreams		Short film
2006	Macbeth	Lady Macduff	
2008	Em4Jay	Janey	
2008	Trampoline	Mother	Short film
2009	Dungoona	Trish	TV film
2014	Flat Daddy	Kate	Short film
2014	Jack Irish: Dead Point	Ros	TV film
2015	Sucker	Emma	
2018	West of Sunshine	Mel	
2019	Little Monsters	Tess	
2020	Domicide	Molly	Short
2022	Victim	Chrissy	Short

== Selected theatre credits ==
Year	Title	Role	Venue
2006	Festen	Helene	Fairfax Studio, Arts Centre Melbourne
2008	Frost/Nixon	Caroline	Fairfax Studio, Arts Centre Melbourne
2010	Creditors	Tekla	Red Stitch Theatre, Melbourne
2014	The Speechmaker	Mitch	Playhouse, Arts Centre Melbourne
2016	Disgraced	Emily	Fairfax Studio, Arts Centre Melbourne
2019	Heisenberg	Georgie Burns	Fairfax Studio, Arts Centre Melbourne
2022	Admissions	Sherri Rosen-Mason	The Sumner, Southbank Theatre
2023	Who's Afraid of Virginia Woolf?	Martha	Red Stitch Theatre, Melbourne
2024	Who's Afraid of Virginia Woolf?	Martha	Comedy Theatre, Melbourne
2025	Who's Afraid of Virginia Woolf?	Martha	Roslyn Packer Theatre, Sydney
2026	Break of Day	Pam	Malthouse Theatre, Melbourne
