= Damian Walshe-Howling =

Australian actor

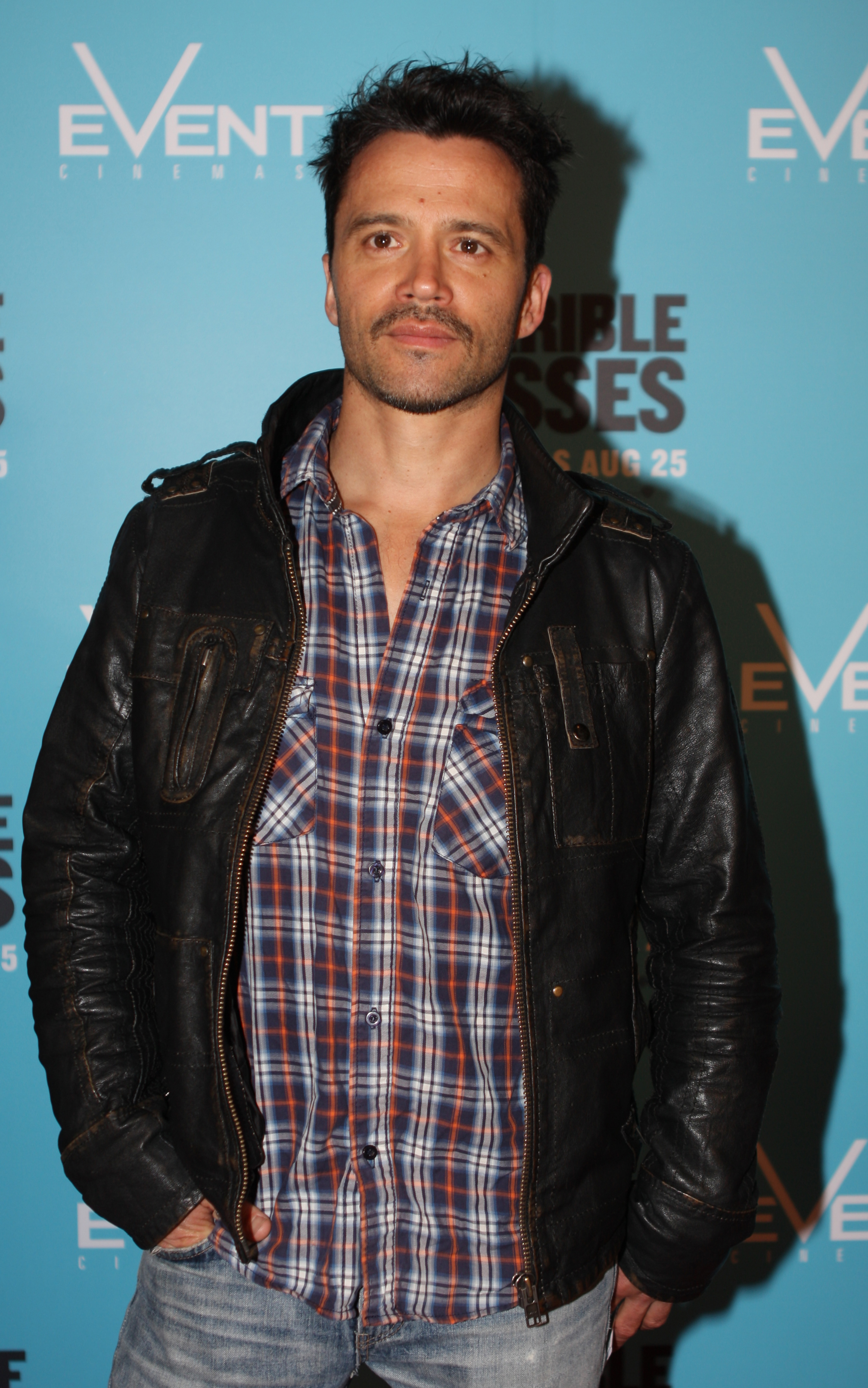
- Walshe-Howling in August 2011
- Born: Melbourne, Victoria, Australia
- Education: Atlantic Theater Company (1999)
- Occupations: Film and television actor
- Years active: 1989–present
- Notable credit(s): Blue Heelers (1994–2006); Underbelly (Best Supporting Actor, 2008)

Damian Walshe-Howling is an Australian actor, well known for his role as Andrew 'Benji' Veniamin in the Australian underworld drama Underbelly, for which he won the Best Supporting or Guest Actor in a Drama Series at the 2008 AFI Awards.

== Early life and education ==
Walshe-Howling was born in the inner south-eastern suburbs of Melbourne. His Italian mother, Iris (née. Romanella) was an actress, involved in the theatre at La Mama and the Pram Factory, a director and drama teacher. His father was a professor of third generation Irish background. Aspiring to be an actor too, Walshe-Howling performed in small theatre shows as a child. He attended a high school that specialised in the arts, before he spent a year studying drama, dance and music at Rusden College. He started professionally in the industry around the age of 19.

In 1999, he studied at New York's Atlantic Theater Company, specifically their technique 'Practical Aesthetics', both internationally and in Australia.

== Career ==
=== Television ===
Walshe-Howling appeared in an episode of the 1990 anthology series More Winners. He had a guest role in long-running soap opera Neighbours in 1993, before he got his first big break starring in Blue Heelers as Constable Adam Cooper. He left in 1998, and returned for the series finale in 2006. His first major television role after leaving the series, was as rock singer Mac in The Secret Life of Us (2001), earning him an Australian Film Institute Award nomination for Best Actor in a Guest Role in a Television Drama Series for his performance.

Other guest roles followed in Marshall Law (2002), Stingers (2003), Wilfred (2007), All Saints (2007), East West 101 (season 2), Rescue: Special Ops and Satisfaction.

In 2008, Walshe-Howling's next major break was starring as real-life crime figure Andrew 'Benji' Veniamin in the first season of Channel Nine's Australian underworld drama Underbelly. The role won him a 2008 Australian Film Institute Award for Best Supporting or Guest Actor in a Drama Series and also saw him nominated for a Silver Logie for Most Outstanding Actor in 2009. That same year, he hosted the Seven Network's factual series Crash Investigation Unit.

In 2010, Walshe-Howling hosted the Nine Network's reality show Customs; and in 2011, he had a guest role in Steven Spielberg's Terra Nova (2011). In 2012, he appeared in Australian TV drama series Bikie Wars: Brothers in Arms as Bandidos vice president Mario 'Chopper' Cianter, and also appeared in long-running children's series, Play School.

In 2014, he appeared in a supporting role in the ABC TV comedy drama series, Old School, alongside Bryan Brown and Sam Neill. He also had a supporting role as star prosecutor Owen Mitchell in three seasons of the ABC's legal drama series, Janet King.

He has most recently been seen in US Netflix superhero series Titans, ABC crime drama Jack Irish opposite Guy Pearce and 2023 crime series Last King of the Cross with Lincoln Younes.

=== Film ===
Walshe-Howling starred in 2000 TV movie Halifax f.p.: A Person of Interest, opposite Rebecca Gibney. That same year, he also appeared in A Wreck A Tangle, playing Benjamin. His first film role after departing his regular role on Blue Heelers was as Milo in 2001 comedy-drama He Died with a Felafel in His Hand with Noah Taylor.

He appeared in a cameo role in 2003 biographical film Ned Kelly, about the famed Australian bushranger, opposite Heath Ledger and Orlando Bloom, after being invited by director Gregor Jordan. He then starred in the 2006 modern day reimagining of Macbeth alongside Sam Worthington. Prior to his breakthrough role in Underbelly, he appeared opposite Joel Edgerton in short film Saturn’s Return. He was set to star in Point Break 2, however, due to the 2008 financial crisis, the film did not go ahead.

He next starred in survival horror film The Reef with former Underbelly co-star Gyton Grantley. The movie was released in Australian cinemas in March 2011. In 2013, he had a supporting role in crime film Mystery Road.

In 2020, he appeared in the 2020 Australian sci-fi thriller 2067, alongside Ryan Kwanten.

=== Theatre ===
In 2008, Walshe-Howling appeared in the Bell Shakespeare production of Pericles, Prince of Tyre. He also went back to his theatre roots with a lead role as Neil in B Sharp production of A View of Concrete.

His other theatre credits include Danny and the Deep Blue Sea, Mojo, Crave, Sam Shepard's Fool for Love and Brendan Cowell's Melbourne production of Men. In 2015 he performed in the Black Swan Theatre Company production of David Mamet's Glengarry Glen Ross. In 2019 he appeared as Marco in Melbourne Theatre Company's production of Arthur Miller's A View from the Bridge.

=== Filmmaker ===
Walshe-Howling is also an accomplished filmmaker. He made his debut with his 2007 short film The Bloody Sweet. After submitting the film to Flickerfest, it made the Australian content section of the competition. A few months later, he was approached to present Flickerfest on Extra, a TV show on Movie Extra, which he went on to host for two years.

His 2012 short film Suspended, which he wrote, produced and directed, screened in official competition at Flickerfest, the 2012 Locarno Film Festival in Switzerland, the 2012 Nashville Film Festival, the 2012 St Kilda Short Film Festival, the 2013 Canberra Short Film Festival, Slamdance Film Festival and Cannes Cinephiles.

In 2015, his short film MESSiAH was one of four winners of the third annual Lexus Short Film Competition, in California. The win enabled him to collaborate with The Weinstein Company and the film then premiered at the Sydney Film Festival.

His 2016 short film Unspoken, which he wrote and directed, was awarded Best Short CinefestOZ in 2024, before taking out the International Grand Prize at the 2025 Clermont-Ferrand International Short Film Festival, France's second-largest film festival after Cannes.

He also completed a Director's Attachment with Peter Andrikidis on Screentime's 2018 miniseries Underbelly Files: Chopper.

== Recognition and awards ==
Year	Title	Award	Category	Result
2001	The Secret Life of Us (episode: "State of Limbo")	AFI Awards	Best Actor in a Guest Role in a Television Drama Series	Nominated
2008	Underbelly (episode: 'Wise Monkeys")	AFI Awards	Best Supporting or Guest Actor in a Drama Series	Won
2009	Underbelly	Logie Awards	Silver Logie for Most Outstanding Actor	Nominated
2009	Damian Walshe-Howling	Cleo	Bachelor of the Year	Nominated
2010	The Reef	A Night of Horror International Film Festival	Best Actor	Won
2012	Suspended	Locarno Film Festival	Golden Pardino - Leopards of Tomorrow Award	Nominated
2013	Suspended	Canberra Short Film Festival	Festival Prize for Best Film	Nominated
2014	The Time of Our Lives	Equity Ensemble Awards	Outstanding Performance by an Ensemble Series in a Drama Series	Nominated
2015	MESSiAH	Lexus Short Film Competition		Won
2024	Unspoken	CinefestOZ	Best Short	Won
2025	Unspoken	Clermont-Ferrand International Short Film Festival	International Grand Prize	Won

== Personal life ==
Walshe-Howling said in 2010, that he had been single for many years.

When it was announced that the first series of Underbelly was banned (for legal reasons) in Melbourne the day before it was due to go to air, Walshe-Howling moved to Sydney to maximise his work opportunities.

While on the set of 2010 film The Reef, he stood on a venomous stonefish, known to be fatal to humans. Production was shut down for 24 hours, while he was in hospital.

An extra, who appeared in 2012 miniseries Bikie Wars: Brothers in Arms, Rebecca Wilson, launched a sexual harassment suit against Walshe-Howling, alleging he "forcibly kissed" her during filming in 2011. After a preliminary hearing in 2019, the parties reached an out-of-court settlement and proceedings were dismissed.

Walshe-Howling taught an advanced acting course at Brave Studios at the Cotton Mills in Footscray, Melbourne.

== Filmography ==
=== Film ===
==== As actor ====
Year	Title	Role	Notes
1999	A Wreck A Tangle	Benjamin	
2001	He Died with a Felafel in His Hand	Milo	
2003	Ned Kelly	Glenrowan policeman	
2004	Josh Jarman	Fringe theatre actor	
2005	The Umbrella Men	John	Short film
2005	Rupture	The Man	Short film
2006	Three Months at Sea	Julian	Short film
2006	Teenage Lust	Tom	Short film
2006	Kenny	Crazy man in toilet	
2006	Macbeth	Ross	
2006	Insignia	Paul Andrews	Short film
2008	Crushed		
2010	The Clearing	Adam	Short film
2010	The Reef	Luke	
2011	Monkeys	Friend 2	Short film
2011	Post Apocalyptic Man	Shade	Short film
2012	Summer Suit	Dad	Short film
2013	Mystery Road	Wayne Silverman	
2013	Around the Block	Brent Graham	
2017	Goodnight Sweetheart	Tyson	Short film
2018	House Party	Knives	Short film
2018	Desert Dash	Ivan	Short film
2020	2067	Billy Mitchell	
2022	Darklands	John Kolt	

==== As director / producer / writer ====
Year	Title	Credited as				Notes
Year	Title	Director	Producer	Writer	Editor	Notes
2007	The Bloody Sweet Hit	Yes	No	Yes	No	Short film
2009	Dog Meat	No	No	No	Yes	Short film
2012	Suspended	Yes	Co-producer	Yes	No	Short film
2016	Messiah	Yes	No	Yes	No	Short film
2016	Unspoken	Yes	Yes	Yes	Yes	Short film
2025	A Good Boy	No	Pre/post-production consultant	No	No	Short film

=== Television ===
Year	Title	Role	Notes
1990	More Winners	Reg Sanders	Episode: "Boy Soldiers"
1993–1994	Neighbours	Troy Duncan	7 episodes
1994–1998; 2006	Blue Heelers	Constable Adam Cooper	Main role (seasons 1–5) guest role (season 13); 178 episodes
1995	Sky Trackers	Hoon	1 episode
2000	Halifax f.p.	Scott Brennan	Season 5, episode 1: "A Person of Interest"
2001	Love Is a Four Letter Word	Dean Masselos	4 episodes
2001	Saturn's Return	Dimi	Short TV film
2001	The Secret Life of Us	Mac	7 episodes
2002	Marshall Law	Jeffrey Mason	1 episode
2003	Stingers	Dave Williams	1 episode
2005	Heartbreak Tour	Danny	Short TV film
2005	Life	Joey Cardamone	TV film
2007	Wilfred	Keith	1 episode
2007	All Saints	Jacob Shipper	1 episode
2007–2008	Satisfaction	Gino	2 episodes
2008	Underbelly	Andrew 'Benji' Veniamin	6 episodes
2008–2011	Crash Investigation Unit	Narrator	
2009	Whatever Happened to That Guy?	Jarred	1 episode
2009	Rescue: Special Ops	Nick	1 episode
2009	East West 101	Tony Caruso	1 episode
2009–2010	Flickerfest on EXTRA	Narrator	
2011	Panic at Rock Island	Rufus Mitchell	TV film
2011	Terra Nova	Carter	8 episodes
2012	Bikie Wars: Brothers in Arms	Mario 'Chopper' Cianter	Miniseries (main role)
2012	Agony Uncles	Himself	6 episodes
2013	The Time of Our Lives	Ewan	4 episodes
2014–2017	Janet King	Owen Mitchell	24 episodes (main role)
2014	Old School	Vince Pelagatti	7 episodes
2017	Blue Murder: Killer Cop	Alan Abrahams	Miniseries, 1 episode
2018	Wrong Kind of Black	Kevin	Web series, 4 episodes (main role)
2018	Bite Club	Dr. Kristof Olsen	8 episodes (main role)
2018	Titans	Graham Norris	1 episode
2019	Blue Water Empire	Wing Commander Donald Thompson	Docudrama
2019	Welfare	Jackson Spencer	Web series, 1 episode
2019	Buying Blind	Narrator	6 episodes
2021	Jack Irish	Daryl Riley	1 episode
2023	Last King of the Cross	Joey Romano	7 episodes
2024	Til You Make It	Finn	1 episode
2024	Thou Shalt Not Steal	Spider	1 episode

== Theatre ==
Year	Title	Role	Notes
1993	Accidental Death of an Anarchist		Deakin University, Melbourne
1996	Fool For Love		Carlton Courthouse, Melbourne with Hoy Polloy Theatre
2001	Crave		Belvoir St Theatre, Sydney
2003	Slide Night		La Mama, Melbourne
2003	Mojo		The Store Room, Melbourne
2008	Pericles, Prince of Tyre		Bell Shakespeare
2008	A View of Concrete	Neil	Belvoir St Theatre, Sydney
	Danny and the Deep Blue Sea		
2015	Glengarry Glen Ross	Ricky Roma	Heath Ledger Theatre, Perth with Black Swan Theatre Company
2019	A View from the Bridge	Marco	Southbank Theatre, Melbourne with MTC
	Men		Melbourne
2024	Gluttony: The Play	Paul	Hotel Windsor, Melbourne with Red Stitch Actors Theatre
