= Nazeem Hussain =

Australian comedian

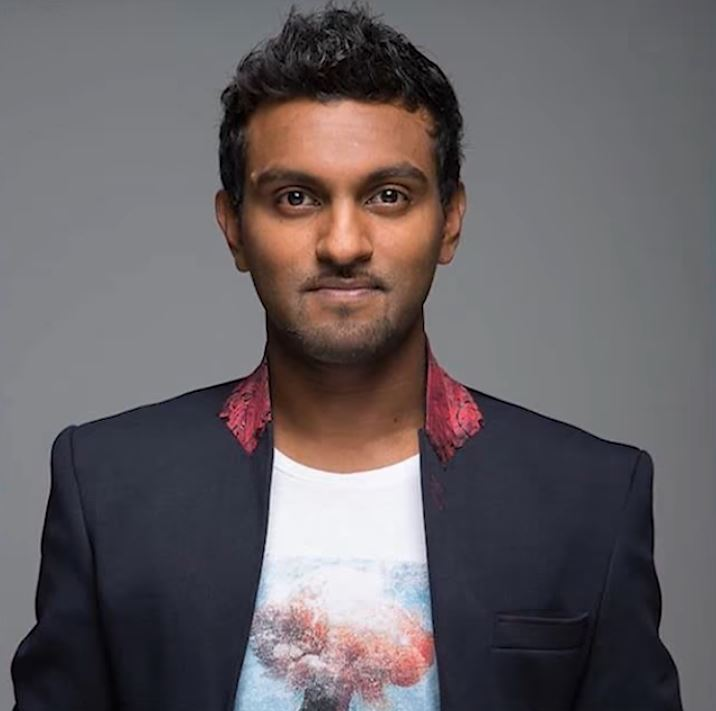
- Hussain in 2015
- Born: Melbourne, Victoria, Australia
- Notable work: Salam Café, Legally Brown, Orange Is the New Brown

Comedy career
- Medium: Stand-up; television; radio; film
- Website: www.jubileest.com/nazeem-hussain

Nazeem Hussain is an Australian comedian, actor, and television and radio presenter.

He is best known as the creator and star of two television comedy shows, Legally Brown and Orange Is the New Brown. He also has multiple comedy specials, including Nazeem Hussain: Public Frenemy (2019) on Netflix and 'Hussain in the Membrane' (2022) on YouTube. He also appeared as a correspondent for both seasons of the hit Netflix series Bill Nye Saves the World with American scientist and TV personality Bill Nye.

Hussain released his first children’s book series, Hy-larious Hyena, through Scholastic Australia, in 2022.

== Early life and education ==
Nazeem Hussain was born in 1985 or 1986, and was raised in Melbourne, Victoria, to parents of Sri Lankan descent. He has two sisters. His parents met in London and moved to Melbourne for his father's work, but they separated when Hussain was six, and his father returned to Sri Lanka.

He attended Ashburton Primary School and Melbourne High School. Some of his later comedic work is based on the bullying and racism he experienced as a child.

He later graduated from Deakin University with degrees in law and science.

== Career ==
=== Stand-up comedy ===
As a stand-up comic, Hussain was awarded the Best Newcomer Award at the Melbourne International Comedy Festival in 2008. He has been nominated for the Helpmann Award for Best Comedy Performer.

He has performed around the world, including sold-out tours at the Edinburgh Festival Fringe and London's Soho Theatre.

Hussain's Netflix comedy special, titled Nazeem Hussain: Public Frenemy, filmed at Montreal's Just for Laughs festival, began streaming worldwide in 2019. This garnered him a significant number of new fans, and received positive reviews from critics. Both Funny or Die and Chortle included Hussain's special among their top picks. He opened for Dave Chappelle in New York City, and across Australia on his national tour. Hussain also opened for Aziz Ansari in Sydney in 2019.

=== Television ===
Hussain has appeared in many Australian and international comedy TV shows and reality TV programs.

Hussain performed as Calvin Khan - the 'Very Foreign Correspondent' - on Balls of Steel Australia on the Comedy Channel. He also starred and co-wrote on the cult-hit show Salam Cafe on SBS, which received a Logie Award nomination in 2009.

He is known for his work as the creator and lead of the popular TV show Legally Brown, which aired on SBS Television for two seasons in 2013 and 2014. The show was nominated in the Most Outstanding Comedy category at the 2015 Logie Awards.

In 2017, Hussain became known to mainstream audiences on season 3 of the Australian version of 'I'm a Celebrity... Get Me Out Of Here!. He reached the Grand Finale after 46 days spent in the South African jungle. His campmates included Dane Swan, Steve Price, Casey Donovan, and Natalie Bassingthwaighte.

In October 2018, his TV comedy series Orange Is the New Brown aired on Channel 7 at prime time. It received rave reviews and viewer numbers. Hussain created and starred in the show. Other cast members included Claudia Karvan, Tim Minchin, Urzila Carlson, and Kat Stewart. Many of the sketches from the series went viral, with some clips receiving over 10 million views.

Hussain was an official correspondent for both seasons of the Netflix series Bill Nye Saves the World, alongside renowned American scientist and television personality Bill Nye. Hussain's fellow correspondents included: Karlie Kloss, Derek Muller, Emily Calandrelli, and Joanna Hausmann.

Hussain placed third on the Amazon original comedy series Last One Laughing Australia, where Rebel Wilson served as the host, alongside some of Australia's most popular comedians, in a high-stakes competition to make each other laugh while maintaining a straight face.

In 2024, he was named in the cast for ABC series The Role of a Lifetime. In 2025 he appeared as a contestant on Claire Hooper's House of Games.

In 2026, he voiced Archie in The Pout-Pout Fish, alongside Nick Offerman, Jordin Sparks, and Amy Sedaris.

Hussain appeared as a guest on Virginia Trioli's ABC TV show Creative Types in March 2026. He appears in the upcoming sitcom Separated at Birth, with Urzila Carlson.

=== Other media ===
Hussain's first podcast, Burn Your Passport, won iTunes Best Comedy Podcast in 2016 and was ranked in the top 20 most-listened-to podcasts in Australia. He is also the host of the ABC's Pineapple Project.

Hussain created and starred in the Audible Original podcast Rogue Son, a personal and humorous exploration of his relationship with his Sri Lankan heritage and the complexities of cultural identity. Rogue Son proved to be a major hit, with positive reviews from critics and listeners, ranking high on Audible's most popular podcasts.

In 2022, Hussain released his first new children’s book series, Hy-larious Hyena, through Scholastic Australia.

== Personal life ==
Hussain met his wife Juanita at university, and they married in a Muslim ceremony in 2015, but separated in 2018. They have a daughter together.

== Filmography and discography ==
=== Albums and TV specials ===
Solo albums and TV specials
Title	Release date	Debut medium
Comedians of the World – Public Frenemy	1 January 2019	Streaming TV (Netflix)
Hussain in the Membrane	5 November 2022	Streaming TV (YouTube)
Totally Normal	3 February 2025	Streaming TV (YouTube)

Collaborative albums and TV specials
Title	Release date	Debut medium
Fear of a Brown Planet	31 August 2011	DVD Video
Comedy in Color: Volume 3	10 December 2021	Audio streaming
