= Steady Eddy =

Australian comedian

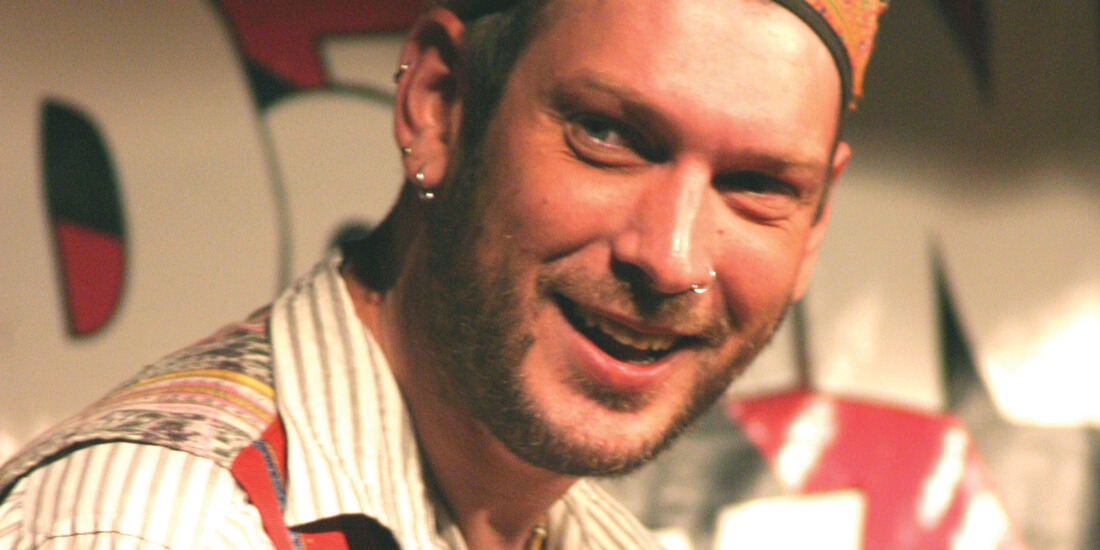
- Born: Christopher Widdows; 7 December 1968 (age 57)
- Occupations: Comedian, actor
- Awards: Young Australian Achievers Award from the Melbourne International Comedy Festival)

Christopher Widdows (born 7 December 1968) is an Australian stand-up comedian and actor primarily known by the stage name 'Steady Eddy.' Born with cerebral palsy, his disability became a key part of his comedy, hence his performing moniker.

'Steady Eddy's' mainstream career began in 1992 with appearances on popular Australian TV programs like Nine Network's The Midday Show and Seven Network's Tonight Live with Steve Vizard, becoming a frequent personality throughout much of the 1990s and early 2000s. He was one of the first disabled performers to be featured prominently in Australian mainstream media.

== Stand-up comedy ==
'Steady' began performing stand-up in 1991, with his first Australian stand-up tour kicking off in 1993 with "Ready Steady Go!". The performance recording won the ARIA Award for Best Comedy Release. He followed up in 1994 with “Quantum Limp”, which won him the Young Australian Achievers Award at the Melbourne International Comedy Festival. Steady performed internationally throughout the nineties including at the Just For Laughs Comedy Festival in Montreal, the Austrian Comedy Festival in Vienna, the Edinburgh Fringe Festival and the LA Comedy Store.

In 1999, he served as Master of Ceremonies for the national tour by Australian band Midnight Oil. As of 2016, he has been part of the musical-comedy duo The Jingo Brothers, with Steady Eddy and Jolly Jingo performing a mix of skits, stand-up, original songs and covers with Adelaide Fringe saying "critics compare them with Peter Cook and Dudley Moore".

== Film & TV ==
Across his career, he has appeared in numerous film and television productions, including a 1994 episode of A Country Practice titled "There Was a Crooked Man". That same year he made his big screen debut in Ben Lewin's romantic-comedy Paperback Romance (also known as Lucky Break in the US) with Anthony LaPaglia and Rebecca Gibney.

In 2004, Steady co-starred as Trevor in the Australian-made comedy, Under the Radar, alongside Nathan Phillips, Chloe Maxwell and Clayton Watson. He appeared as a character playing himself in the 2007 ABC TV miniseries Bastard Boys.

== Discography ==
=== Albums ===
Title	Details
Ready Steady Go!	Released: 1993; Label: Festival Records (D31046); Format: CD
Born To Be Bent	Released: 1998; Label: Belly Laugh Records (SW98007); Format: CD

== Awards and nominations ==
=== ARIA Music Awards ===
The ARIA Music Awards is an annual awards ceremony that recognises excellence, innovation, and achievement across all genres of Australian music.

Year	Nominee / work	Award	Result
1994	Ready Steady Go!	Best Comedy Release	Won

=== Mo Awards ===
The Australian Entertainment Mo Awards (commonly known informally as the Mo Awards), were annual Australian entertainment industry awards. They recognise achievements in live entertainment in Australia from 1975 to 2016. Steady Eddy won four awards in that time.

Year	Nominee / work	Award	Result (wins only)
1993	Steady Eddy	Comedy Performer of the Year	Won
1993	Steady Eddy	New Wave Comedy Performer of the Year	Won
1994	Steady Eddy	New Wave Comedy Performer of the Year	Won
1995	Steady Eddy	New Wave Comedy Performer of the Year	Won

== See also ==
- Josh Blue – (born 1978) American comedian with cerebral palsy
