= Under the Radar (film) =

2004 film

- Directed by: Evan Clarry
- Written by: Steve Pratt
- Produced by: Chris Brown; Chris Fitchett
- Starring: Nathan Phillips; Clayton Watson; Steady Eddy; Chloe Maxwell
- Cinematography: Philip M. Cross
- Edited by: Antonio Mestres
- Music by: Frank Tetaz; David Thrussell
- Production companies: Macquarie Film Corporation; Pictures in Paradise
- Distributed by: Hoyts
- Release date: 29 July 2004
- Running time: 91 minutes
- Country: Australia
- Language: English
- Budget: $130,000

Under the Radar is a 2004 Australian adventure comedy film directed by Evan Clarry and starring Nathan Phillips, Clayton Watson, Steady Eddy and Chloe Maxwell. It was filmed in the Gold Coast, Queensland, Australia.

== Cast ==
- Nathan Phillips as Brandon
- Clayton Watson as Adrian
- Steady Eddy as Trevor
- Chloe Maxwell as Jo
- Robert Menzies as Ched
- Syd Brisbane as Garry
- Gyton Grantley as Trent
- Teo Gebert as Ash
- Damien Garvey as Gene
- Robert Rabiah as Mario
- Steve Mouzakis as Lee
- Rory Williamson as Ricardo
- Marg Downey as Maxine

== Reception ==
Australia's SBS review of the film noted an indecisiveness of what genre was intended, yet concluding the production "harks back to a more innocent era of Australian film making and has all the elements of becoming a cult film in years to come".

== Awards ==
The film was nominated for the Australian Film Institute award for Best Actress in a Leading Role (Chloe Maxwell) and won the Australian Screen Sound Guild award for Best Achievement in Sound for a Feature Film - Sound Design in 2004.

== Box office ==
Under the Radar grossed $162,757 at the box office in Australia.

== See also ==
- Cinema of Australia
