= Underbelly series 1 =

First season of the Australian crime drama

Underbelly
- Season 1
- No. of episodes: 13

Release
- Original network: Nine Network
- Original release: 13 February – 7 May 2008

Series chronology
- Next → A Tale of Two Cities

The first series of Australian crime television drama series Underbelly originally aired from 13 February 2008 to 7 May 2008 on the Nine Network and is loosely based on the real events of the 1995–2004 gangland war in Melbourne. It depicts the key players in Melbourne's criminal underworld, including the Carlton Crew and their rival, Carl Williams. The series is based on the book Leadbelly: Inside Australia's Underworld, by journalists John Silvester and Andrew Rule, and borrows its name from the successful Underbelly true crime anthology book series also authored by Silvester and Rule. An alternative and significantly updated tie-in novel, Underbelly: The Gangland War, was released as their 13th book in the series. The series is produced by the Australian Film Finance Corporation, in association with Film Victoria. The executive producers are Des Monaghan and Jo Horsburgh.

The lead-up to Underbelly involved a heavy marketing campaign which covered radio, print, billboards and an increased online presence, including the use of social networking tools. At a reported cost of $500,000, both this marketing investment and potentially millions of dollars in advertising revenue were claimed to be put at risk by the Victorian Supreme Court's injunction, as the series was expected to attract 800,000 to 1 million viewers in Victoria alone. The injunction was put in place to ensure that upcoming criminal trials were not unfair to the accused, because the series contained fictionalised re-enactments of several disputed events. Underbelly began screening on 13 February 2008 on the Nine Network in all states and territories except Victoria and some regional parts of New South Wales, Queensland, South Australia, Tasmania and the Northern Territory. An edited version of the series premiered in Victoria on 14 September 2008 after the injunction was partially lifted, although only the first five episodes were shown. In 2011, the injunction was partially lifted and the series was screened as "Underbelly: Uncut". This rebroadcast included scenes from the original DVD release, as well as several significant changes that were made to keep the show current, including a newly recorded final voiceover and the crediting of several characters that were previously uncredited (allowable due to the ending of related trials). Some previously named characters in the final episode however are now unable to be named, resulting in a continued banning of the sale of the video release in Victoria.

Underbelly was a critical and ratings success, being described as "Australia's best ever crime drama". Despite this critical success, the series has been the target of controversy due to its glamourised depiction of crime and violence. The opening double episodes, which aired on 13 February, attracted an average of 1,320,000 viewers nationally, minus Victoria. Every episode of the 13-part series was soon made available for download on a range of sites, with the Nine Network saying it was considering legal action. The legal DVD of Underbelly was released on 8 May 2008, a day after the final episode was aired on television. Due to the legal suppression, the release was not able to be distributed through any retail or rental outlets in Victoria or on the internet. The ban remains in place in 2013, due to legal issues involving the final episode of the show. It was the first in a continuing series, and was later followed by Underbelly: A Tale of Two Cities, Underbelly: The Golden Mile, Underbelly: Razor, Underbelly: Badness, Underbelly: Squizzy and the sequel to the first series Fat Tony & Co., as well as multiple spin-offs and four television films released as Underbelly Files.

== Synopsis ==
=== Overview ===
A promotional image of the cast of Channel Nine's Underbelly. From left to right: Jason Moran (Les Hill), Roberta Williams (Kat Stewart), Carl Williams (Gyton Grantley), Alphonse Gangitano (Vince Colosimo), Danielle McGuire (Madeleine West) and Steve Owen (Rodger Corser).

Underbelly is a fictionalised account of the Melbourne gangland war (1995–2004). In the first episode, the Carlton Crew crime syndicate is introduced, comprising stand-over man Alphonse Gangitano (Vince Colosimo), Domenic "Mick" Gatto (Simon Westaway), loanshark Mario Condello (Martin Sacks), retired bank robber Graham Kinniburgh (Gerard Kennedy) and drug-dealing siblings Jason and Mark Moran (Les Hill, Callan Mulvey) and their father Lewis (Kevin Harrington). Jason Moran's seemingly harmless and half-witted driver Carl Williams (Gyton Grantley) is also introduced, along with two police characters; Steve Owen (Rodger Corser) and Jacqui James (Caroline Craig), the most prominent members of Task Force Purana.

Alphonse Gangitano, the self-styled "Black Prince of Lygon Street", kills a man at a party over a small debt and with Jason injures 13 innocent people. During his trial, Gangitano is murdered by Jason, although the killing goes unsolved. The Moran brothers buy a pill press and employ Carl Williams to produce their drugs. Carl secretly begins making his own supply and forms an alliance with Moran rival Tony Mokbel (Robert Mammone). When Carl is busted by the police, Jason discovers his double-cross and shoots him in the stomach, before Jason is arrested. Mark Moran takes over the drug business, selling Tony Mokbel out to a corrupt officer from the drug squad. Carl kills Mark with the assistance of drug dealer Dino Dibra (Daniel Amalm) and L (Ian Bliss), who establish a false alibi. Lewis Moran hires Andrew "Benji" Veniamin (Damian Walshe-Howling) to avenge his stepson, believing the killer to be Dibra. Benji kills Dibra then offers his services to Carl and becomes his bodyguard, although Carl is eventually jailed. Carl's wife, Roberta (Kat Stewart), is forced to run the business and she begins an affair with Benji.

Carl is released from jail and Jason Moran is given special parole conditions to allow him to move to London. Moran rival Nik "The Russian" Radev (Don Hany) becomes a liability and Carl has him murdered by Benji and T. (Alex Dimitriades). Jason returns from London and a concerned Lewis offers to run the business but is arrested during a bust. With Benji under constant police observation, Carl asks L. and T. to murder Jason, who is killed in front of his children. Carl orders a hit on small-time dealer Willie Thompson, who turns out to be a friend of Tony Mokbel. Tony blames another small-time dealer, Michael Marshall and asks Carl to kill him. L. and T. shoot Marshall and are immediately arrested but the police are unable to prove Carl's involvement in the crime.

When Graham Kinniburgh is murdered, Carl agrees to end the violence and asks Benji to murder Gatto. Gatto instead kills Benji and is arrested, although he is later acquitted. A new thug, Keith Faure (Kym Gyngell) (only named in the 2011 "Uncut" broadcast), offers to join Carl but wants to take over. Several days later, Faure kills Lewis Moran in a crowded bar. Consumed by revenge for Benji's death, his friend, the convicted killer Lewis Caine (Marcus Graham), decides to kill Condello, the last survivor of the Carlton Crew. Caine is double-crossed by his accomplices and is murdered beforehand. Detective Owen has Condello's bodyguard "Tibor" arrested. They turn Tibor to record Condello ordering a hit on Carl. Carl's jailed associates testify against him. In the series finale, Task Force Purana and Owen arrest Carl at a family barbecue. A voice-over by police officer Jacqui James, reveals that Mick Gatto is eventually acquitted for the killing of Andrew Veniamin and that Mario Condello is killed while awaiting trial on attempted murder charges. The final voice-over was rerecorded during the production of Underbelly: Razor in preparation for the 2011 airing of the show in Victoria to also include information on Carl Williams' murder and Tony Mokbel's arrest in a "cheap wig" in Greece.

== Episodes ==
No. overall	No. in series	Title	Directed by	Written by	Original release date
1	1	"The Black Prince"	Tony Tilse	Peter Gawler	13 February 2008
The Carlton Crew crime syndicate is introduced: Mick Gatto, Mario Condello, Alphonse Gangitano, Graham Kinniburgh and Lewis, Mark and Jason Moran. Gangitano kills a man at a party over a small debt, and using fear convinces key witnesses to flee the country. With Jason Moran's assistance, he then smashes up an inner city nightclub injuring thirteen innocent people.
2	2	"Sorcerer's Apprentice"	Tony Tilse	Peter Gawler	13 February 2008
Alphonse pleads guilty in his assault case, but his associates intimidate the witnesses, frustrating the police trying to convict Jason. Alphonse tries to redeem himself and decides to leave the criminal world, but is murdered by Jason over a stripper with whom they were both having an affair.
3	3	"I Still Pray"	Geoff Bennett	Felicity Packard	20 February 2008
The Moran brothers buy a pill press from a bikie gang. Jason's driver Carl Williams secretly begins making his own supply and forms an alliance with Moran rival Tony Mokbel. When one of the bikies kills two people, his ex-wife Tracey Seymour, a former girlfriend of both Jason Moran and Alphonse Gangitano, is convinced by Det. James to testify against him, only to be murdered as a result.
4	4	"Cocksure"	Geoff Bennett	Greg Haddrick	27 February 2008
Carl's cheap drugs throw the city's trade into chaos. Drug dealer Dino Dibra's plan to extort money from the Morans and their rival Nik Radev goes wrong when he kidnaps a junkie for whom no one wants to pay the ransom. When Carl is busted, the Morans discover the double-cross and Jason shoots him in the stomach. Meanwhile, Detective Owen convinces a foreign national to testify in Jason's assault case, allowing them to put him behind bars.
5	5	"The Good, the Bad, the Ugly"	Peter Andrikidis	Peter Gawler	5 March 2008
With Jason in prison, Mark Moran takes over the family business, turning Tony Mokbel in to a corrupt officer from the drug squad. Carl asks Dino Dibra to kill Mark, but Dibra refuses and instead teaches him how to do the job himself with assistance from another thug, the rapist Mr. L. As Jason stews in jail, Carl kills Mark outside his home and, with Mr. L's help, establishes a perfect false alibi.
6	6	"Luv U 4 Eva"	Peter Andrikidis	Greg Haddrick	12 March 2008
Mark and Jason's father Lewis hires Mick Gatto's associate Andrew "Benji" Veniamin to avenge his stepson, believing the killer to be Dibra. As Dibra is a close friend, Benji hesitates until Dino incriminates himself. However, after Tony Mokbel is viciously beaten in a confrontation Gatto does nothing to prevent, Benji offers his services to Carl.
7	7	"Wise Monkeys"	Peter Andrikidis	Felicity Packard	19 March 2008
Carl is jailed for drug offenses, leaving his wife Roberta to run the business. Roberta is furious when rival dealer Paul Kallipolitis successfully extorts money from her. Kallipolitis makes the mistake of betraying his old friend Benji, who murders him.
8	8	"Earning a Crust"	Peter Andrikidis	Peter Gawler	26 March 2008
Under financial pressure caused by the Williams' trade, Carlton Crew loanshark Mario Condello begins calling in his debts. Jason Moran is given special parole conditions to allow him to move to London and be safe from harm. Nik Radev becomes a liability to Carl and Tony and is murdered by Benji and Mr. T, a friend Carl made in prison. When Carl's young neighbour falls foul of Condello and kills himself in shame, Carl becomes even more determined to wipe out his rivals. Through a listening device in the Williams' home, Det. James discovers Benji's identity as he and Roberta begin an affair.
9	9	"Suffer the Children"	Grant Brown	Felicity Packard	2 April 2008
Jason Moran returns from London. Concerned for his safety, his father Lewis offers to take over the day-to-day running of the business but is arrested during a bust. With Benji under police observation, Carl offers the contract to Mr. L and Mr. T. In a city park in front of his children, Jason and his minder are executed.
10	10	"Scratched"	Grant Brown	Greg Haddrick	16 April 2008
Carl orders a hit on Willie Thompson, unaware he was a friend of Tony Mokbel. Ignorant of the perpetrator, Tony blames another small time dealer Michael Marshall and asks Carl to take care of it. Carl's hitmen Mr. L and Mr. T shoot Marshall in the street while under police surveillance and are immediately arrested.
11	11	"Barbarians at the Gate"	Tony Tilse	Peter Gawler	23 April 2008
Carl publicly accuses Detective Owen of corruption. Graham Kinniburgh and Mick Gatto fear for each other's safety. When Kinniburgh is murdered, Gatto suspects Benji. Carl agrees to end the violence but calls Benji's loyalty into question. Gatto calls Benji to a meeting and kills him, where he is subsequently arrested.
12	12	"Best Laid Plans"	Tony Tilse	Felicity Packard	30 April 2008
Consumed by a desire for vengeance over Benji's death, former Carlton Crew lackey Lewis Caine pushes Carl to take out a contract on Mario Condello. Meanwhile, Lewis Moran is gunned down in a crowded bar. As Caine moves on Condello, his double-crossing accomplices murder him.
13	13	"Team Purana"	Tony Tilse	Peter Gawler	7 May 2008
As Carl makes plans to have Condello killed, Detectives Owen and James convince his jailed associates Mr. L and Mr. T to testify against him, finally getting the evidence they need to arrest him and bringing the war to an end. In the epilogue, it is revealed that Carl and Roberta divorce while Mick Gatto is cleared of any wrongdoing and is released from prison.

== Cast and characters ==
Underbelly features four regular cast members, with 27 actors who recur throughout the series.

=== Main ===
- Rodger Corser as Detective Steve Owen
- Caroline Craig as Detective Jacqui James
- Gyton Grantley as Carl Williams
- Kat Stewart as Roberta Williams (Carl's wife)

=== Recurring ===
- Frankie J. Holden as Garry Butterworth
- Les Hill as Jason Moran
- Callan Mulvey as Mark Moran
- Vince Colosimo as Alphonse Gangitano
- Simon Westaway as Mick Gatto
- Damian Walshe-Howling as Andrew "Benji" Veniamin
- Martin Sacks as Mario Condello
- Kevin Harrington as Lewis Moran
- Caroline Gillmer as Judy Moran
- Gerard Kennedy as Graham 'Munster' Kinniburgh
- Don Hany as Nik "The Russian" Radev
- Robert Mammone as Tony Mokbel
- Marcus Graham as Lewis Caine
- Daniel Amalm as Dino Dibra
- Andrew Gilbert as Victor Peirce
- Kim Gyngell as Keith Faure (uncredited in original broadcast)
- Alex Dimitriades as Victor Brincat (Mr.T in original broadcast)
- Ian Bliss as Thomas Hentschel (Mr.L in original broadcast)
- George Kapiniaris as Lawyer (George Defteros)
- Neil Melville as Todd McDonald
- Ryan Johnson as Rocco Arico
- Robert Rabiah as Paul 'PK' Kallipolitis
- Eliza Szonert as Trish Moran
- Madeleine West as Danielle McGuire
- Jane Harber as Susie Money
- Lauren Clair as Tracey Seymour (Vicki Jacobs)
- Dan Wyllie as 'Mad' Richard Mladenich
- Brett Swain as Tibor 'Goose' Cassadae
- Nathaniel Dean as Sidney Martin (Gerald Preston)
- Lliam Amor as Greg Workman
- Tony Nikolakopoulos as Veniamin Father
- Danielle Carter as Virginia Gangitano
- Damien Fotiou as Bill 'Bubba' Kaldas
- Jane Harber as Susie Money
- John Brumpton as Vince Love

=== Guests ===
- Laura Gordon as Ella
- Marta Kaczmarek as Odinia Mladenich
- Nicholas Bell as Colin
- Rohan Nichol as Brendan Kraus
- Charlotte Gregg as Lilla Rigby
- Eddie Baroo as The Ferret
- Tiriel Mora as Andrew's Barrister
- Sue Jones as Medium
- Sullivan Stapleton as Pat Barbaro

== Production ==
=== Development ===
Underbelly is based on the book Leadbelly: Inside Australia's Underworld, by Age journalists John Silvester and Andrew Rule. As the Nine Network was interested in creating local and world-class television, they decided to invest in a drama series that told the story of the Melbourne gangland killings. Jo Horsburgh, Nine Network Head of Drama, stated that the network was "100 percent committed to bringing Underbelly to the small screen". Des Monaghan, executive producer for Screentime, called the series "one of the most exciting and challenging drama projects ever shot in [Australia]". The script took 12 months to write, beginning in June 2006, with the main writers, Greg Haddrick, Peter Gawler and Felicity Packard putting together an entire episode themselves before their scripts were edited. Haddrick, Screentime's Head of Drama, felt that the challenge for the writing team was to "capture the essential truth of these extraordinary events in a compelling and coherent manner".

Underbelly was filmed in Melbourne, at locations around the city where the real-life events occurred. Filming took over 82 days, from 2 July to 19 October 2007, with 150 inner urban locations utilised and 450 locations surveyed making the series as close to life as possible. Parts of the series were filmed in the Essendon area, near many of the houses and schools associated with the "Underworld". Many of the Carlton scenes were filmed in North Melbourne, primarily around Errol Street. All La Porcella filming was done at Rubicon Restaurant Errol Street, and jail visit sequences were filmed in the dressing rooms at the Telstra Dome.

=== Marketing ===
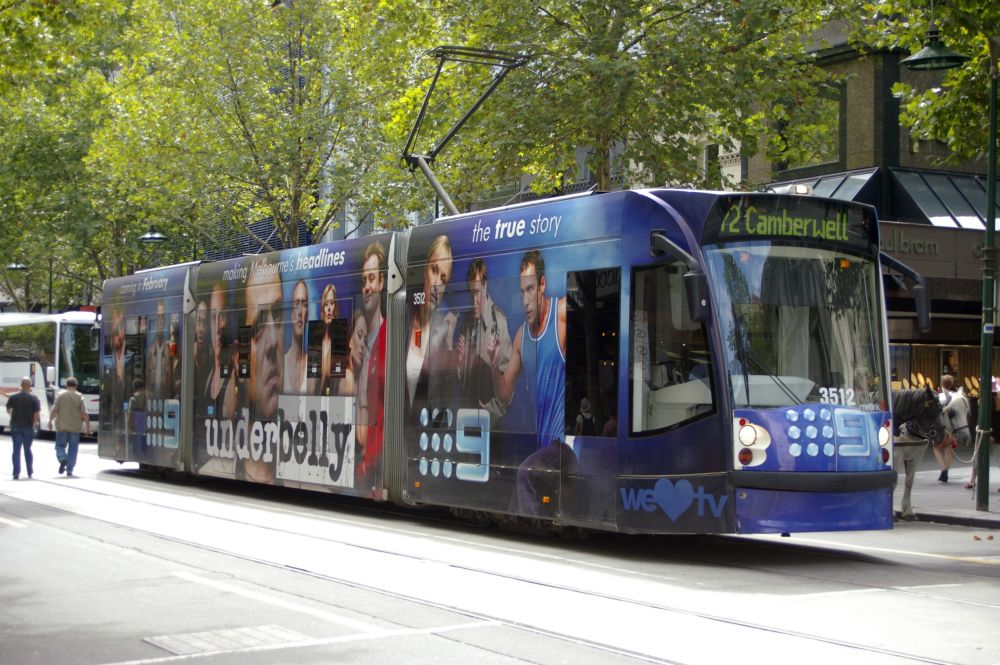
Underbelly advertisement on a Melbourne Tram

The Nine Network spent more than fifteen million dollars producing and promoting Underbelly. The lead-up resulted in a heavy marketing campaign which covered radio, print, billboards and an increased online presence, including the use of social networking tools. When the CEO of the Nine Network, David Gyngell noted the need to up its online presence, and embrace social networking as a valuable marketing tool, the official website was launched. The original website was launched on 15 January 2008, with only a 3-minute trailer; while the full site, with all its features, launched on 1 February 2008. It was announced that the full first episode would be available for download on the site on 10 February, three days before the show premieres on television, but this option was made unavailable due to the Supreme court suppression case. This intention follows a similar strategy used for the launch of Sea Patrol in 2007. The site was "poised to become" the biggest and most detailed website the Nine Network has hosted for a show so far, including features such as behind the scenes footage, profiles, visitor interactivity and the use of social networking tools. Due to the court injunction, the Nine Network was ordered to remove character profiles from its official website in Victoria.

According to its marketing, Underbelly "uses the framework of the murderous war between the two gangs, and the bigger moral war between the gangs and the Purana Task Force, to explore a complex array of individual stories and relationships—some touching, some incredible, all breathtaking—it is a mini-series that examines the kaleidoscopic nature of loyalty, love, revenge and pride when the normal and identifiable emotions of human attachment are moved from the context of social decency to social indecency."

=== Franchise ===
The series' first prequel, Underbelly: A Tale of Two Cities, revolves around the organised crime groups that stemmed from the Griffith-based dope trade. The series follows the lives of two late infamous drug lords, "Aussie Bob" Trimbole and Terry "Mr Asia" Clark, portrayed by Roy Billing and Matthew Newton respectively. Filming took place in both Sydney and Melbourne until March 2009. Sydney locations Richmond, Bondi Beach and Warwick Farm were used to portray Griffith in the 1970s. Writers Peter Gawler and Greg Haddrick admitted that there was more nudity and sex than the original. The prequel premiered on 9 February 2009 to 2.5 million viewers, making it the highest rated non-sporting program in the history of Australian television ratings. The second prequel, titled Underbelly: The Golden Mile, began airing on 11 April 2010. A telemovie trilogy known as The Underbelly Files was made and then aired in early 2011. The three telemovies Infiltration, The Man Who Got Away, and Tell Them Lucifer Was Here. The fourth series, Underbelly: Razor, began airing on 21 August 2011 and was mostly concerned with telling the story of 1920s criminal matriarchs Tilly Devine and Kate Leigh. It was also therefore a prequel to the original series. A New Zealand version titled Underbelly NZ: Land of the Long Green Cloud aired in 2011. The fifth series, Underbelly: Badness which tells the story of modern Sydney underworld figure Anthony Perish first aired on 13 August 2012. The current production, Underbelly: Squizzy, is set to air in late 2013 and is a biography of Squizzy Taylor.

== Impact ==
=== Critical reception ===
The first episode of the series was screened privately to media on 17 January 2008, prior the media had been treated with extracts and trailers promoting the series. On 3 January 2008, The Sydney Morning Herald's critic Michael Idato declared the series "The Blue Murder of its time", referring to the critically acclaimed 1995 ABC TV drama Blue Murder, considered by many to be the finest crime drama ever produced in Australia. In a review on his blog on 17 January 2008, David Knox, stated that Underbelly "is our own Sopranos", and awarded it 4.5 out of 5. He also commented "If there are any criticisms to be found with Underbelly, they are few. One or two shots give away that period Melbourne was actually shot in 2007. And while watching these gangsters thrive on power with ballsy disdain, it was hard not to think of the behaviour of some television executives in recent history. This aside, Underbelly looks set to be one of the highlights of the 2008 television year." A review appeared in the Herald Sun on 18 January 2008, in which critic Paul Anderson quoted: "Whether you followed the Melbourne gangland war or not, there's a fair chance you will be blown away by the coming TV series Underbelly. [It] is a slick, violent and sexually charged dramatisation backed by a ripping soundtrack." In an article appearing on 31 January 2008, The Daily Telegraph's TV editor, Marcus Casey, said of Underbelly after viewing the first four episodes: "If the quality is maintained then, while not perfect, Underbelly should equal, if not better, Australia's best ever crime dramas – the Phoenix series and Blue Murder."

=== Australian Family Association's reaction ===
On 11 February 2008 the Australian Family Association (AFA), was publicly outraged that Underbelly would be screening at 8:30 pm, well within reach of children, after clips of the series were leaked onto the internet. The clips highlighted the use of extreme profanities, and scenes that show a violent bashing, a cold-blooded murder, and a sexual encounter. The Nine Network defended the timeslot and the M classification, saying the clips, leaked from the Network's production department, were indeed from the series, but not all of them made the final cut. The Network set its own classification, under the accepted rules of the Australian Commercial Television Code of Conduct. The Australian Family Association threatened to take the matter to Communications Minister Stephen Conroy if the content of the show was anything near that of an unauthorised promotional clip leaked from Nine's production department.

=== Ratings ===
The opening double episodes, which aired on 13 February, attracted an average of 1,320,000 viewers nationally, minus Victoria, making it the third most-watched show of the night. In Victoria alone, the series was expected to attract 800,000 to 1 million viewers, which would have put Underbelly figures over the 2 million mark. The replacement movie for Underbelly in Victoria, The Shawshank Redemption, managed only 271,000 viewers. The third episode, which aired on 20 February, managed to hold most of its viewers from its premiere, attracting 1,273,000 viewers nationally, a decline of only 50,000 viewers. The fourth episode, which aired on 27 February, managed to hold nearly all of its viewers from the previous episode, attracting 1,250,000 viewers nationally, a decline of only 23,000 viewers. Although leaked copies of all the episodes became available online, the show continued to attract "huge television audiences". Underbelly averaged 1.26 million viewers for all 13 episodes.

Episode		Original air date	Viewers (millions)	Nightly rank
1	"The Black Prince"	13 February 2008	1.249	7
2	"Sorcerer's Apprentice"	13 February 2008	1.324	4
3	"I Still Pray"	20 February 2008	1.273	4
4	"Cocksure"	27 February 2008	1.249	7
5	"The Good, the Bad, the Ugly"	5 March 2008	1.224	4
6	"Luv U 4 Eva"	12 March 2008	1.233	4
7	"Wise Monkeys"	19 March 2008	1.271	4
8	"Earning a Crust"	26 March 2008	1.195	7
9	"Suffer the Children"	2 April 2008	1.219	6
10	"Scratched"	16 April 2008	1.247	6
11	"Barbarians at the Gate"	23 April 2008	1.237	6
12	"Best Laid Plans"	30 April 2008	1.344	4
13	"Team Purana"	7 May 2008	1.417	4

=== Awards ===
Underbelly was nominated for eight awards at the 2008 AFI Awards, winning six. The awards won were: Best Drama Series; Best Director (Peter Andrikidis, for episode 7); Best Lead Actor (Gyton Grantley); Best Lead Actress (Kat Stewart); Best Guest or Supporting Actor (Damian Walshe-Howling, for episode 7); and Best Guest or Supporting Actress (Madeleine West, for episode 7). The series was also nominated for Best Screenplay (Peter Gawler); and Best Guest or Supporting Actor (Vince Colosimo, for episode 2). At the 2008 Screen Music Awards, composer Burkhard Dallwitz won two awards for best television theme and best music for a television series.

The show was also nominated for nine Logie Awards. It won three awards from the nominations of Most Outstanding Drama Series, Most Outstanding Actor in a Drama Series (Gyton Grantley) and Most Outstanding Actress in a Drama Series (Kat Stewart). The other six nominations were from the categories of Most Outstanding Actor (Vince Colosimo and Damian Walshe-Howling), Most Outstanding New Talent (Lauren Clair), Most Popular Drama Series, Most Popular Actor (Gyton Grantley) and Most Popular Actress (Kat Stewart).

== Legal issues ==
=== Supreme Court writ threat ===
George Defteros, a high-profile lawyer, against whom criminal charges were dropped because the prosecution did not have enough evidence, disrupted the lead-up to the series' launch, when he threatened the Nine Network with a Supreme Court writ on 26 January 2008. Defteros, said to be portrayed by George Kapiniaris, engaged a top Melbourne defamation specialist, saying:

"Any attempt to depict me as a lawyer of low impropriety and unethical behaviour will be met with legal proceedings instituted by my lawyers, I regard the depiction of the gangland wars, in particular my role as a lawyer acting for parties, as nothing more than farcical and pure pantomime. We'll be watching it very closely."

— George Defteros

Nine Network had subsequently said there would now be no direct reference to Defteros, despite earlier publicity. A spokeswoman for the network said "There is no lawyer called Defteros in Underbelly", but Defteros said he could still be defamed by implication, noting "it's already been advertised as me". The case was dropped by Director of Public Prosecutions Paul Coghlan, QC, due to a lack of evidence.

=== Supreme Court suppression ===
One of the many pages sporting a "This functionality is not available due to current legal restrictions" notice.

The screening of Underbelly in Victoria was put into jeopardy after last-minute legal proceedings were instituted by the Director of Public Prosecutions, Jeremy Rapke, QC. Rapke secured an urgent viewing of the series, after which he decided to seek an injunction stopping its broadcast in Victoria. A Supreme Court judge called prosecutors and defence lawyers together after serious concerns were raised about whether the show could prejudice the jury in the trial of Evangelos Goussis, who had pleaded not guilty to the 2004 gangland killing of Lewis Moran. Although Goussis was not named in the series, there were concerns the show could hurt his chance of a fair trial.

The Supreme Court hearing took place on 11 February 2008 – only two days before the series was due to premiere. The Nine Network was ordered by a DPP subpoena to hand over tapes of all 13 episodes, as well as outlines and story lines, to the Victorian Supreme Court by 10 am on that date. The Nine Network refused to voluntarily hand over the tapes, saying they were incomplete and that the network's lawyers were closely supervising production. It was willing to comply with any Court order and took the matter very seriously. The Network was also adamant that the series makes no assertions about the guilt of the accused killer. At the hearing, which took place at the Geelong Supreme Court, Justice Betty King gave prosecution and defence lawyers 24 hours to view the series and return to court the following day to decide whether it had the potential to affect the forthcoming trial.

Justice King issued a suppression order on 12 February banning the Nine Network from broadcasting the series in the state of Victoria and on the internet until after the murder trial was completed. The Nine Network offered to air a heavily edited version in Victoria, but the offer was rejected by Justice King. It was initially planned that an alternative program, Underbelly: A Special Announcement, discussing the subject matter of the series, would air in Victoria instead of the series premiere. This idea was scrapped, and the movie The Shawshank Redemption was aired in Victoria instead. The Nine Network declared their intention to appeal the decision, and Network lawyers stated that they would exercise all legal options.

The injunction also affected national audiences receiving transmissions from Imparja Television, a Nine Network affiliate, because its single national satellite distribution signal is retransmitted in some parts of Victoria. Alternative programming was to be shown until the restriction was lifted.

The appeal began on 29 February 2008 in the Victorian Court of Appeal. Nine Network lawyers argued that the network should be allowed to broadcast the first three episodes of the series, arguing Justice King had erred in her decision to suppress the series because she had viewed the unedited version, rather than the final edited cut that was to be shown to audiences. The network believed the first three episodes, which depicted events from the beginning of the underworld war in 1995, would have no potential to prejudice any part of the trial. Goussis's murder trial was due to begin on 31 March 2008. The judges overseeing the appeal retired to decide their verdict on 3 March 2008. Their decision on 26 March 2008 upheld Justice King's ruling that the series was not to be broadcast or distributed in or out of Victoria. During the appeal the Nine Network had proposed to screen the first three episodes immediately after any successful appeal, and would give the court seven days written notice of its intention to show any further episodes that it believed would not prejudice the murder trial. The Court of Appeal had dismissed the network's application to appeal, and the network was compelled to comply with the suppression order issued by Justice King until the offending trial was complete.

The ban expired the week ending 30 May 2008, with the conviction of Goussis for the murder of Lewis Moran, paving the way for Nine to begin screening episodes; however, Andrew Rule, who co-wrote the book on which the series is based, says Underbelly will not be seen in Victoria anytime soon, saying "the problem now will be that Tony Mokbel is back in Australia and ready to stand trial on very serious charges. That will effectively prevent the series being screened in Victoria until that trial is held ... That could be some time. I'm not sure about several [years], but it might be two years." However, Underbelly was legally shown in Victoria in September 2008, after a court ruled that the network could air the first five episodes. Supreme Court Justice Peter Vickery gave the network permission to air the specially edited episodes, but said screening the sixth episode could prejudice the upcoming trials of an accused criminal. The edited versions had whole scenes cut out, and Tony Mokbel's face was pixelated. Reactions from viewers were not favourable, mainly because most had already seen the entire series.

== Underbelly: Uncut (2011 Victorian Broadcast Version) ==
The suppression order was partially lifted after Mokbel's trial in April 2011, after which the series was broadcast in Victoria. A 9:30 pm timeslot allowed the airing of the 'Uncut' edition, based on the episodes as they appeared in the DVD/Blu-ray release, and a few further alterations were made to update the show's significantly outdated summary of current events. The final voice over of the series, in the episode "Purana", was rerecorded (during production of Underbelly: Razor) to include events that occurred up to, and including, 2011 (such as Carl Williams' murder and Tony Mokbel's arrest). It is almost a minute longer than the original voice over summary. Other episodes contained less significant changes to the original voice over summaries, indicating they had also been rerecorded.

Kym Gyngell (Keith Faure), Alex Dimitriades (Victor Brincat) and Ian Bliss (Thomas Hentschel) are now fully credited in the episodes in which they starred, with the textual explanation given that their characters could not be named at the time of production but can now be named as of 2011, due to the end of their related trials. They are still unnamed in the dialog of each episode.

The show, however, is still not allowed to be sold on DVD/Blu-ray in Victoria, because a character in the "Purana" episode that was named in the original broadcast and DVD/Blu-ray release, was not allowed to be named at the time of the rebroadcast due to a pending court case and subsequently had their name edited out. Because the DVD/Blu-ray release is based on the original 2008 broadcast and not the 2011 "Uncut" broadcast, it is still not allowed to be sold in Victoria until the suppression order is fully lifted, or the alternative version is released.

== Sequel ==
Fat Tony & Co. was confirmed on 3 August 2013, with series production beginning on 5 August 2013. It was not branded as Underbelly due to changes in funding with Screen Australia, but chronologically acts as a direct sequel to the first series of the show, with most of the same cast playing the same characters with only one or two exceptions. Based on Tony Mokbel, the series covers the manhunt for Mokbel that lasted 18 months, and dismantled his drug empire. It was filmed in Greece. It first aired on 23 February at 8:40 pm on Channel 9.

== Distribution ==
=== International distribution ===
Underbelly began airing in New Zealand on TV3 on Sunday at 9:30 pm, but the network put the series on hiatus after three episodes because it was "not performing as expected in the time slot". Due to a public outcry, TV3 reversed their decision 48 hours later, saying it was "bowing to the pressure of angry fans". TV3 reinstated the series in its old timeslot, but rescheduled it to 11:15 pm on Tuesday evenings just weeks later. TV3 senior publicist Nicole Wood said the show had failed to win new viewers in the Sunday slot, and even though they were "inundated with fans" when they took it off air, it "still didn't rate" on its second showing. The series was brought back to primetime in July 2009, after the sequel series performed well in New Zealand. Beginning with episode 1, the series is currently playing every Thursday at 9:30 pm. In April 2008, the Nine Network signed an international distribution deal with Fox International Channels and Portman Film & Television. The series will be broadcast in Scandinavia, Canada, France, the UK, Italy (Rai 4), Balkans, Korea, Pan-Asia, Portugal, Russia, South Africa, Turkey and Germany. Gyngell said, "to say we are pleased is an understatement – we are delighted that the series will gain international audiences and global recognition". Scottish commercial broadcaster STV have signed up to broadcast the series. Series 3 is now broadcasting after the good reception of the first two series. U.S. satellite-only service DirecTV will broadcast the entire trilogy, beginning in February 2010, on its channel "The 101".

Season 1 airs in the Republic of Ireland on free-to-air channel TV3 Ireland from Thursday, 23 September 2010 at 10 pm.

The series is also available on Stan.

=== Illegal distribution ===
Despite the ban on broadcasting the series in Victoria, Victorians were still able to access episodes via illegal online distribution. The first episode was made available on torrent sites within 20 minutes of it concluding in New South Wales. The Nine Network reportedly obtained the IP address of the first person to upload the show, and network lawyers were considering legal action. The Australian Federation Against Copyright Theft (AFACT) was investigating the matter, and was expected to make a list of recommendations to Victoria Police. Fears of inside leaks were aroused when advance screener versions of the first eight episodes were posted online.

Every episode of the 13-part series was soon available for download on a range of sites. It was reported that on mininova.org more than 3,000 users were attempting to download episode seven late on the afternoon of 27 February 2008. The Nine Network said it was considering legal action, and was looking into how copies got into the hands of underworld figures in Victoria, including Roberta Williams, the former wife of gangland kingpin Carl Williams. Unauthorised copies of the entire series were also made available to the public. People were offered a 4-disc DVD set for between A$10 and $80 in public places such as carparks and building sites. The episodes were commercial-free and came with introductory station countdowns, suggesting a major leak from inside the network's production department.

Two network employees had been questioned by the network over the matter, but both denied distributing any copies of the series. Unlicensed DVDs containing the first nine episodes of Underbelly were seized in a raid by police on a business in Melbourne's western suburbs on 11 March 2008. The 41-year-old man arrested faced charges of copyright infringement and of breaking the court order banning broadcast of the program in Victoria. Along with the Underbelly DVDs, more than 7000 other unlicensed DVDs were uncovered, as well as eight printers and 70 new DVD burners. The group of infringers contained several members, some of whom had been arrested for offences in the months prior.

=== Merchandise ===
The legal Underbelly DVD was released 8 May 2008 by Roadshow Entertainment, a day after the final episode was aired on television. In accordance with the legal suppression, the release was not distributed through any retail or rental outlets in Victoria or on the internet. Roadshow Entertainment has confirmed that all box sets and point of sale displays will carry a sticker or stamp reminding buyers the series is not for sale, distribution or exhibition in Victoria. Legal experts said Victorians who bought the box set interstate and watched it themselves at home would likely not fall foul of the law, but anyone who showed it more widely could be charged with contempt. The DVD has sold 265,000 copies around Australia. In September 2008, a Limited Edition DVD was released, containing a numbered steel case and an extra disc with a documentary entitled Carl Williams – A Day of Reckoning. The Underbelly soundtrack was released on 29 March 2008, both as a CD and online. It features elements of the score by Burkhard Dallwitz in addition to music tracks that were featured in the series. Underbelly was released on Blu-ray on 5 August 2010.

== See also ==
- List of Australian television series
