= Gyton Grantley =

Australian actor and comedian (born 1980)

- Born: 17 July 1980 (age 46); Brisbane, Queensland, Australia
- Education: Anglican Church Grammar School (1997); Queensland University of Technology (2003)
- Occupations: Actor, comedian
- Years active: 2001–present
- Known for: Underbelly; House Husbands
- Children: 3

Gyton James Grantley (born 17 July 1980) is an Australian actor and comedian, best known for his portrayal of convicted murderer and drug trafficker Carl Williams in the hit Australian television show Underbelly.

== Early life ==
Grantley was born to parents Dick and Sandy and he has a brother. He was educated at the Anglican Church Grammar School in Brisbane, where he graduated in 1997. During his school years, he was a rugby union player and a rower. He was also heavily involved in drama and theatre-sports, and won the Headmaster's Prize for Drama in his senior year.

After he finished high school, not confident he could make a living out of acting, Grantley studied an arts degree at the University of Queensland. However, after a year, he decided to audition for Queensland University of Technology (QUT). Unsuccessful on his first attempt, he was finally accepted two weeks before the year started. He graduated in 2001 with his acting degree. He began doing voiceover work at the age of 18, while studying. Soon thereafter, he moved to Sydney, where he secured an agent.

== Career ==
Grantley began his screen acting career in 2001, with a guest appearance in comedy drama series Fat Cow Motel alongside Brendan Cowell, playing Gary Walpole. Over the next few years, he had several small roles in films including Schoolies week drama Blurred (2002), comedy Danny Deckchair (2003) with Rhys Ifans, adventure-comedy Under the Radar (2004) with Nathan Phillips and A Man's Gotta Do (2004). He also made further guest appearances in television, including two-part miniseries Marking Time (2003) with Abbie Cornish, and legal series Small Claims (2004–2006) with Claudia Karvan and Rebecca Gibney.

From late 2005, Grantley began playing the ongoing role of Dane Pickerstaff in short-lived drama series headLand. In 2006, he had a small role in Foxtel comedy-drama series Supernova, before landing a 10-episode guest role in long-running soap opera Home and Away the following year. His character, nurse James Dalton, was involved in a love triangle with Kit Hunter (Amy Mizzi) who was pregnant to Kim Hyde (Chris Hemsworth). Grantley also appeared in 2007 romantic comedy film All My Friends Are Leaving Brisbane alongside Ryan Johnson.

In 2008, Grantley shot to fame in the first season of high-rating underworld crime drama Underbelly, playing real life antagonist and criminal Carl Williams, opposite Kat Stewart, Rodger Corser, Damian Walshe-Howling and Callan Mulvey. His performance won him the award for 'Most Outstanding Actor' at the Logie Awards.

In 2009, he had a starring role as Sumo in 30 Seconds, reuniting with his Underbelly co-star Kat Stewart, and appearing alongside Peter O'Brien and Stephen Curry. He also starred opposite Don Hany and Susie Porter in the second season of East West 101, as Craig Deakin. He also appeared in the 2009 Tropfest Short Film Festival finalist Being Carl Williams where Grantley, playing himself, is abducted by two criminals who mistake him for Carl Williams after his role in Underbelly. That same year, he had a small role in romantic crime film Prime Mover opposite Michael Dorman as well as featuring in biographical war film Balibo with Anthony LaPaglia.

In 2010, Grantley played the role of Norman Morris in war drama Beneath Hill 60 opposite Brendan Cowell and then starred as Matt in shark thriller The Reef, reuniting with his Underbelly cast mate Damian Walshe-Howling in the latter.

In 2012, Grantley was cast in a new series, House Husbands, playing Kane Albert, one of the four main characters. In 2015, he left the series after its fourth season, however returned in the fifth-season finale for a brief appearance.

It was announced in late 2013 that Grantley would be reprising his role of Carl Williams in the spin-off series Fat Tony & Co. (which was not placed under the Underbelly franchise, for financing reasons), which focused on the rise and fall of Tony Mokbel, who also featured in the original series, played by Robert Mammone. During this time, Grantley appeared in his first stage musical, portraying comic rogue Luther Billis in Opera Australia's production of South Pacific. After having auditioned for the role, he took over from Eddie Perfect, for the Brisbane season. In 2015, Grantley appeared as Barney McSwiney in comedy-drama film The Dressmaker (2015), alongside Kate Winslet, Judy Davis, Sarah Snook and Liam Hemsworth.

Grantley appeared in 2017 film Don't Tell, playing opposite Aden Young and Jack Thompson. That same year, he also took on his first TV presenting role, as host of Network 10's Pooches at Play, a lifestyle show all about dogs and our relationship with them, continuing for three seasons, until 2018. That same year, he performed in the role of Jason in the theatrical production Hand to God. In 2019, he took on the role of Ron Weasley in the Australian stage production, of Harry Potter and the Cursed Child in Melbourne.

Grantley reprised his role of Carl Williams for the third time in Informer 3838, in 2020. He has since said that the role – which had made him famous – led to people calling him 'Carl' almost everyday.

In 2021, Grantley served as narrator on the reality show Space Invaders, which he has continued for six seasons, through to 2026. In 2023, he played the role of Cain Foster in the TV series We Were Tomorrow, as well as Allan Carter in the crime drama miniseries Human Error. That same year, he competed in the second season of reality series The Traitors, alongside reality personality Ash Pollard and Australian Survivor alumnus Luke Toki. He was 'banished' in the second episode.

Most recently, Grantley played the character of Wally in 2024 children's film Woody Woodpecker Goes to Camp. On 25 August 2025, he was named in the cast for the film Her Aussie Romance. Once complete, the Hallmark film was renamed A Melbourne Match.

Grantley has also performed voiceover work in television advertisements for Subway, Starbucks, Bupa, Google and NRL.

== Filmography ==
=== Film ===
Year	Title	Role	Notes	Ref.
2001	Bad Ass Mono-Winged Angel	Owen	Short film	
2002	Blurred	Gavin	Feature film	
2003	Swimming Upstream	Swimmer	Feature film	
2003	Danny Deckchair	Stuey	Feature film	
2004	Under the Radar	Trent	Feature film	
2004	A Man's Gotta Do	Dominic	Feature film	
2005	In a Pickle	Officer Barry	Short film	
2007	All My Friends Are Leaving Brisbane	Jake	Feature film	
2009	Beyond Words	Guy	Short film	
2009	Being Carl Williams	Himself	Short film	
2009	Prime Mover	Repo Man #1	Feature film	
2009	Balibo	Gary Cunningham	Feature film	
2010	Beneath Hill 60	Norman Morris	Feature film (Anzac Day release)	
2010	The Reef	Matt	Feature film	
2010	Lucydia	James	Short film	
2011	Everything is Super	Shadow	Short film	
2011	The Maestro	The Maestro	Short film	
2011	The Forgotten Man	Woodcarver	Short film	
2011	Full Catch	Ramon	Short film	
2011	My Beautiful Departed	Stranger	Short film	
2015	At the End	Wanderer	Short film	
2015	The Dressmaker	Barney McSwiney	Feature film	
2015	Spaghetti	Principal B.R. Occoli	Short film	
2017	The Anthesis of Man	Victim #1	Short film	
2017	Don't Tell	Kevin Guy	Feature film	
2023	The Bank Manager	Banks	Short film	
2024	The Nut Farm	Farmer Dee	Feature film	
2024	Woody Woodpecker Goes to Camp	Wally (Mocap)	Feature film	
TBA	Payback Pie	Trevor	Short film	
TBA	Social Distancing		Short film	
	Chucky		Short film	

=== Television ===
Year	Title	Role	Notes	Ref.
2003	Fat Cow Motel	Gary Warpole	2 episodes	
2003	Marking Time	Shane Sheather	Miniseries	
2003	Mermaids	Tim	TV movie	
2004	The Cooks	Danny	1 episode	
2004–2006	Small Claims	Brett Michaels / Det Snr Const Brett Michaels	3 episodes	
2004; 2007	All Saints	Jared Clark / Andy Patton	2 episodes	
2005–2006	headLand	Dane Pickerstaff	11 episodes	
2006	Supernova	Jeff	1 episode	
2007	Home and Away	Jamie Dalton	10 episodes	
2008	Underbelly	Carl Williams	Miniseries, 13 episodes	
2008	Out of the Blue	Alex Jarvis	2 episodes	
2009	Rescue: Special Ops	Willo	1 episode	
2009	30 Seconds	Sumo	6 episodes	
2009	A Model Daughter: The Killing of Caroline Byrne	Andrew Blanchette	TV movie	
2009	East West 101	Craig Deakin	6 episodes	
2012–2017	House Husbands	Kane Albert	47 episodes	
2013	Cliffy	Powell	TV movie	
2014	Fat Tony & Co.	Carl Williams	Miniseries, 9 episodes	
2017	House of Bond	Peter Beckwith	Miniseries, 2 episodes	
2017	True Story with Hamish & Andy	Brett	1 episode	
2017–2018	Pooches at Play	Narrator		
2018	Olivia Newton-John: Hopelessly Devoted to You	Roger Davies	Miniseries, 1 episode	
2018	Drunk History Australia	Ned Kelly		
2018	The Doctor Blake Mysteries	Don Roper	1 episode	
2018	Orange Is the New Brown	Bush Bros / Whatsisname / Competitive Dad	2 episodes	
2018	Thuggery	James March	6 episodes	
2020	Informer 3838	Carl Williams	Miniseries, 2 episodes	
2021–2026	Space Invaders	Narrator	56 episodes	
2022	Two Blue Lines	York	Miniseries	
2024	Human Error	Allan Carter	Miniseries, 5 episodes	
2024	We Were Tomorrow	Cain Foster	6 episodes	
2026	A Melbourne Match	Scott	TV movie	
2026	Healthy, Wealthy and Wise	Himself	Segments: feasts	

=== Other appearances ===
Year	Title	Role	Notes	Ref.
2023	The Traitors	Contestant	Season 2, 2 episodes	
2024	The Big Trip	Self	5 episodes	
2025	Claire Hooper's House of Games	Contestant	5 episodes	

== Theatre ==
Year	Title	Role	Notes	Ref.
2011	Ruben Guthrie	Ruben Guthrie	Roundhouse Theatre, Brisbane with La Boite	
2013	South Pacific	Luther Billis	Lyric Theatre, Brisbane / Sydney Opera House with Opera Australia	
2018	Hand to God	Jason	The Alex Theatre, Melbourne	
2019	Harry Potter and the Cursed Child	Ron Weasley	Princess Theatre, Melbourne	
2026	Commentary	Nick	Dunstan Playhouse, Adelaide with STCSA	

== Awards ==
Year	Work	Award	Category	Notes	Ref
2008	Underbelly	AFI Awards	Most Outstanding Actor in a Drama Series	Won	
2009	Underbelly	Logie Awards	Logie Award for Most Outstanding Actor	Won	
2009	Underbelly	Logie Awards	Most Popular Actor	Nominated	
2014	House Husbands	Equity Ensemble Awards	Outstanding Performance by an Ensemble in a Drama Series	Nominated	
2014	Cliffy	Equity Ensemble Awards	Outstanding Performance by an Ensemble in a Miniseries or Telemovie	Nominated	

== Personal life ==
Grantley is married to schoolteacher Alex Ortuso. The couple initially met at a music festival in Queensland in 2010, but started their relationship when Grantley moved to Melbourne, after securing his role in House Husbands. After dating for five years, they got engaged in Italy in 2015, before wedding in secret, in a private registry ceremony in early 2016. This was followed by a celebration in Byron Bay in April 2016, officiated by Grantley's House Husbands co-star Julia Morris.

The couple revealed on the day of their wedding that Alex was 17 weeks pregnant with their first child. Their son was born on 10 August 2016, arriving five weeks early. They welcomed their second child, a daughter on 2 May 2019. Their third child, another daughter, was born on 16 February 2021.

Since 2023, Grantley and his family have been living on the Italian island of Sardinia, the ancestral home of his wife, having put their Ivanhoe family home up for lease.

Grantley previously dated comedian Nikki Osborne, after having met at drama school.

Grantley is actively involved with the Australian organisation, 'Polished Man', which helps support and raise awareness for children affected by violence.
