= The White Room (Australian game show) =

- Genre: Game Show
- Presented by: Tony Moclair; Julian Schiller
- Country of origin: Australia
- Original language: English
- No. of seasons: 1
- No. of episodes: 2

Production
- Running time: 60 minutes

Original release
- Network: Seven Network
- Release: 11 February – 18 February 2010

The White Room was an Australian television trivia game show broadcast on the Seven Network. The show was hosted by Tony Moclair and Julian Schiller. It debuted on 11 February 2010, and last aired on 18 February 2010, as the show was cancelled after just 2 episodes.
