= Chloe Maxwell =

Australian model and television presenter

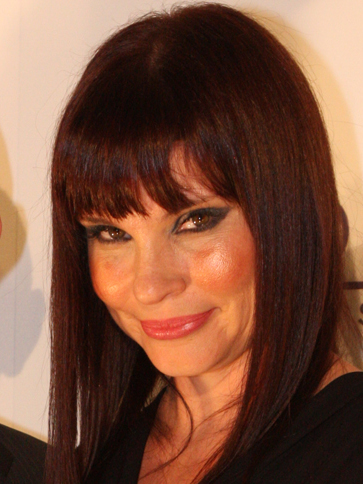
- Maxwell (2012)
- Occupations: Model, television presenter
- Spouse: Mat Rogers (m. 2008)
- Children: 2

Chloe Maxwell is an Australian model and television presenter who appeared as the "Jeans West Girl" in a Jeans West campaign. She was discovered by chance during an A Current Affair story, featuring a model recruiter who claimed they could pick a model just by looking at them.

== Career ==
Maxwell started her modelling career as a "Jeans West girl", after which she transitioned to a career as a television presenter. She shot a documentary in Ethiopia for World Vision Australia called Aussie Girl in Ethiopia. She worked on the TV channel Fox8 and reported on night life for E News Australia. She was a "VJ" on Channel V Australia for four years, interviewing international and national bands. As an entertainment reporter on The Matty Johns Show on Channel 7, Maxwell interviewed various celebrities.

Maxwell starred in the Australian comedy/thriller Under the Radar (2004) as Jo, a role which earned her a nomination for an AFI Award. She appeared in the 2008 series of the television gameshow It Takes Two. She wrote a biography for HarperCollins called Living with Max, Our Family Story.

She was a co-host on the wellness show Live Well on the Seven Network.

She was a contestant on the documentary Maxing Out series two, in which she undertook an Ironman triathlon in Germany called Challenge Roth in an effort to raise awareness for her charity 4ASDKids (of which she is a founder with her husband Mat Rogers); she finished the race in 13 hrs and 15 mins and her journey documented on the show was screened on Network Ten, National Geographic and multiple channels around the world.

== Personal life ==
Chloe Maxwell attended Pittwater High School, Mona Vale and Roseville College in Sydney's North Shore.

Maxwell formed a relationship with former dual International (Rugby Union and Rugby League) ex Cronulla Sharks and Gold Coast Titans player Mat Rogers on 26 January 2005, and the couple had two children together. Rogers already had two children from a prior relationship. In 2008, Maxwell and Rogers were married at the Hyatt Regency Sanctuary Cove Resort on the Gold Coast.

Maxwell and Rogers founded the charity 4 ASD Kids in 2009 after their son Max and his friend Lachlan Greer were diagnosed with autism. As of 2016, the charity had raised over $1.6m.
