= Ghozt Crew =

Australian paranormal documentary series

Ghozt Crew is an Australian paranormal documentary series, that follows Rob Kerr, Lorraine Kerr, Bobby C and Marshall Davison as they travel to and film in Australia's most haunted locations. They are unofficially recognized as Australia's leading paranormal investigation team, and have appeared on National Television, Radio, Newspapers. Ghozt Crew have filmed at Monte Cristo Homestead Junee, Studley Park House, Maitland Gaol, Old Dubbo Gaol, Macquarie Arms Hotel, Picton, Beechworth Lunatic Asylum, The Bright Oriental Hotel as well as many more famous Australian haunted locations.
