= The Bounce (TV series) =

Television series

- Genre: Variety/Sports
- Presented by: Peter Helliar; Matthew Richardson; Leigh Matthews; Catherine Ellis; Peter Rowsthorn; Dave Lawson
- Country of origin: Australia
- Original language: English
- No. of seasons: 1
- No. of episodes: 5

Production
- Executive producer: Rick McKenna
- Producer: Pip Mushin
- Running time: 44 minutes

Original release
- Network: Seven Network
- Release: 24 March – 22 April 2010

The Bounce is an Australian sports television program which debuted on 24 March 2010. It was a variety program focused on the Australian rules football league, and was hosted by comedian Peter Helliar. It also featured former Australian rules footballers Matthew Richardson and Leigh Matthews.

== Demise ==
After five episodes, on 22 April 2010, the Seven Network announced that the show had been stopped 'indefinitely', at least until the finals series in September. This was cited as due to its poor ratings in the AFL heartland of Melbourne. However, the program was never brought back. Seven instead broadcast a primetime version of AFL Game Day during the Finals Series. The AFL Footy Show did a song parodying The Bounce in their Grand Final show, making fun the show's bad ratings and reviews that had The Vicar Of Dibley repeats replacing it. Ironically, The AFL Footy Show would also be cancelled due to declining ratings by the end of the decade.
