= Blue Heelers season 12 =

Blue Heelers
- Season 12
- No. of episodes: 42

Release
- Original network: Seven Network
- Original release: 2 February – 16 November 2005

Season chronology
- ← Previous; Season 11 Next → Season 13

The twelfth season of the Australian police-drama Blue Heelers premiered on the Seven Network on 2 February 2005 and aired on Wednesday nights at 8:30 PM. The 42-episode season concluded on 16 November 2005 with a double episode. The main cast saw the departure of Paul Bishop as Ben Stewart and Jane Allsop as Jo Parrish, and the introduction of Charlie Clausen as Alex Kirby and Matt Holmes as Matt Graham. The twelfth season was released on DVD as a complete set on 4 November 2010.

== Casting ==
The season also saw the departure of Geoff Morrell and Martin Sacks, who chose to take time off to spend with their families. Sacks's departure left Julie Nihill and John Wood as the only remaining original cast members; and the only cast members to have been on this show since before 2001.

=== Main ===
- John Wood as Senior Sergeant Tom Croydon
- Julie Nihill as Christine 'Chris' Riley
- Martin Sacks as Senior Detective Patrick Joseph 'P.J.' Hasham
- Ditch Davey as Constable → Senior Constable/Detective Evan 'Jonesy' Jones
- Simone McAullay as Constable → Senior Constable Susie Raynor
- Rachel Gordon as Senior Detective Amy Fox
- Samantha Tolj as Constable Kelly O'Rourke
- Danny Raco as Constable Joss Peroni
- Charlie Clausen as Leading Senior Constable/Acting Sergeant Alex Kirby
- Geoff Morrell as Sergeant Mark Jacobs
- Matthew Holmes as Constable Matt Graham

=== Guest stars ===
- Jeremy Lindsay Taylor,
- Val Jellay,
- John Brumpton,
- Joy Westmore,
- Pepe Trevor,
- Margot Knight,
- Tracy Mann,
- Danny Adcock,
- Paul Dawber,
- Lynette Curran,
- Elspeth Ballantyne,
- Alethea McGrath.
- Michael Falzon,

== Reception ==
While the first half of the season, with several high-profile guest stars, maintained the high ratings of the previous season. The second half of the year, it received a gradual mixing of critical reaction, which had initially proved mostly positive.

== Episodes ==
No. overall	No. in season	Title	Directed by	Written by	Australian air date
458	1	"Vengeance"	Chris Langman	Elizabeth Coleman	2 February 2005
Tom is suspended from duty pending a coroner's inquest into a murder he is suspected of committing. Nick returns to help with the investigation just as it seems that Kelly is the only one still believing in Tom's innocence. PJ believes Tom has gone off the rails and is capable of the murder. Tarni's story is that when she came up for air, Tom was gone and she heard a gunshot from the house.
459	2	"Burden of Proof"	Peter Sharp	Tony Morphett	9 February 2005
Tom finds himself the prime suspect for murder as the evidence stacks against him, only for the real killer to strike back by kidnapping Kelly in the hopes of luring Tom into a trap. The Heelers are forced to deal with a 14-year-old confession from a failed armed robber.
460	3	"My Way"	Aarne Neeme	Bill Garner	16 February 2005
Tom returns to work and is unhappy with the relaxed atmosphere fostered by Acting Sergeant Lindy Schroeder, which comes to a head when her leniency causes a theft to become far more complicated. Amy and PJ investigate an armed robbery where the offender asked for a very specific sum, while Kelly and Joss deal with a missing goat.
461	4	"The Walking Wounded"	Steve Mann	Chris Corbett	23 February 2005
Amy is suspicious when a woman's son dies of SIDS just years after her daughter died, also in suspicious circumstances. Jonesy and Susie attempt to make a simple arrest for a drive off, only to find themselves trapped in a shed with the new Leading Senior Constable Alex Kirby. Kelly investigates a mystery guest at the Imperial.[First appearance of Alex Kirby]
462	5	"Chasing Smoke"	Martin Sacks	Ted Roberts	2 March 2005
PJ and Amy are called to a vicious home invasion where a young boy has been cut with a knife, only to discover that the father is Danny O'Keefe, a likely gangster. After an earlier car chase that ended badly, Jonesy finds himself chasing the same suspect and is blamed when the pursuit turns fatal and Alex and Susie must clear his name.
463	6	"Everything a Girl Could Want"	Martin Sacks	Jenny Lewis	9 March 2005
Kelly and Joss are trying to resurrect the Blue Lights sports team when they unexpectedly catch a boy selling heroin and Tom is convinced Danny O'Keefe is involved. Susie and Alex follow up on a mother's report that her daughter has been abducted, but the pair are more convinced she's run away. Joss invites his brother to town, only to find his loyalty torn between his brother and Kelly.
464	7	"One Good Turn"	Grant Brown	John Banas	16 March 2005
Susie and Alex suspect that a schoolteacher has been having an affair with one of her pupils when a father disowns his newborn baby. Joss and Kelly decide to take a drunk home to his Russian-speaking mother instead of charging him, only to discover that he was completely unknown to the woman. Alex makes a play for Susie, not realising that Jonesy likes her.
465	8	"Sex Sells"	Peter Sharp	Peter Dick	30 March 2005
A five-year-old girl goes missing while Susie and Jonesy are questioning her mother just as a young male sex offender on day release disappears, leading to concerns that the girl may be in danger. Kelly defends a young female shop assistant who claims that she was sexually assaulted by a customer because of her provocative uniform. Amy's former lover and Homicide detective Garth Henderson arrives in town and a body is found near Govett's Leap.
466	9	"One Sick Puppy"	Raymond Quint	John Lewis	6 April 2005
PJ, Amy and Garth are investigating a murder when a second body is discovered and it becomes clear that a serial killer is at work in Mount. Thomas Joss and Kelly are called in by the local vet who is concerned that the owner of a badly burned dog may be a potential killer. Susie receives her promotion to Senior Constable and Jonesy is miffed when his doesn't come through at the same time.
467	10	"Killing Time"	Chris Langman	Deb Parsons; Tony Morphett	13 April 2005
Amy, PJ and Garth discover a new link in the serial killings in the form of psychologist Bill Lapscott. When Amy infiltrates the group, she relates a story of childhood abuse and Bill recognises she isn't play-acting. Garth is found staunching the bleeding of a fourth victim while keeping the suspects under surveillance.
468	11	"Mirror Image"	Grant Brown	Deb Parsons; Tony Morphett	20 April 2005
Examination of the latest murder victim reveals that a copycat killer may be at work. Tensions mount between Amy and Garth as his past is revealed. Susie and Jonesy follow up on a report of a baby left in a car, only to find that it has disappeared. Amy is attacked while returning to the station.
469	12	"Blood and Bone"	George Ogilvie	Tony Morphett	27 April 2005
Amy accuses Garth of attacking her in the alleyway, only to change her mind when she remembers a distinctive smell. Just as it appears they've caught their killer, the prime suspect disappears along with Amy. Kelly and Joss track an errant elephant that has disappeared from a small travelling circus.
470	13	"Kicking Over the Traces"	Chris Langman	John Ridley; Stuart Page	4 May 2005
A bomb is left at the hospital and the Heelers go all out to find the person responsible. Susie goes into bat to prove a doctor's incompetence while Joss places Kelly's life in danger with his unorthodox investigations. When a second bomb threat is made against the hospital, Amy and Kelly are placed in the line of fire.
471	14	"Offside"	Aarne Neeme	Michael Brindley	11 May 2005
Joss is caught in the middle of an armed stand-off when a feud between two members of his Blue Lights soccer team gets out of control. Tom believes there's trouble brewing when a criminal associate of Danny O'Keefe meets with him at the Imperial. Susie helps an elderly accident victim, only to be accused of theft.
472	15	"The Life"	Steve Mann	Jeff Truman	18 May 2005
Jonesy becomes involved in an unapproved undercover operation to recover Danny O'Keefe's son, but soon finds himself in the middle of honour killings when Danny pulls out a previously concealed handgun.
473	16	"The Ticket Out"	Chris Langman	Rohan Trollope and Tony Morphett	24 May 2005
Amy and PJ follow up on a violent tobacco theft, which escalates when a truck driver is brought in with unmarked tobacco in his truck and is revealed to be Amy's cousin. Susie struggles to connect with Jonesy in the aftermath of the Danny O'Keefe saga. Kelly and Joss investigate the theft of music equipment.
474	17	"Playing by the Book"	Chris Adshead	Victoria Madden and John Banas	1 June 2005
Amy and PJ investigate an alleged teenage rape, leading Amy to suspect that the girl was not raped by her classmate but rather by her grandfather. Tom's daughter Anna arrives in town, distraught when her car is stolen with her young daughter Daisy asleep inside.
475	18	"Monster"	Steve Mann	Chris Corbett	8 June 2005
Amy decides to have her uncle charged over the abuse she suffered as a teenager, only to discover that the situation is more complicated than she remembered. Susie and Jonesy investigate a series of cold burgs related to the singles scene, while Kelly and Joss take on the case of Tom's grandson's friend's missing rabbit.
476	19	"Dangerous Animals"	Fiona Banks	John Banas	15 June 2005
A wild animal is on the loose in Mount Thomas after savaging a teenage boy. Barry Baxter goes to trial for the police station bombing, only to escape custody and Tom fears he is coming back to Mount Thomas. Jonesy pops the question to Susie, but ruins his chances forever when he loses his temper with Alex.
477	20	"Showdown"	Chris Adshead	Forrest Redlich	22 June 2005
Tom is taunted by emails from Barry Baxter, depicting his missing grandchildren being buried alive. Barry Baxter holds Joss hostage at the Imperial in order to negotiate with Tom, leading to a final showdown with Tom holding a faulty weapon.
478	21	"Car Wars"	Martin Sacks	Jo Kasch	29 June 2005
Jonesy risks his life in a ute surfing competition in order to salvage the lives of a young man and his heavily pregnant sister as Susie hits it off with the attractive victim of a car theft racket. Joss' flash car turns heads, but is sending him broke.
479	22	"Night & Day"	Steve Mann	Tony Morphett	6 July 2005
Jonesy and Alex are called to a noisy party where they find that Susie is among the guests and has a large quantity of drugs in her bag. The driver of a vehicle used in a ramraid is unable to be identified, while Kelly and Joss meet an interesting man.
480	23	"The Party's Over"	Colin Budds	Bill Garner	20 July 2005
Kelly and Joss' birthday celebrations are soured when Kelly's lifelong friend is found dead, with Joss' friend in the frame for drugging and raping her. Susie's new boyfriend offers Joss a way out of his financial troubles, but it may not be legal.
481	24	"Crossing the Line"	Roger Hodgman	Michaeley O'Brien	20 July 2005
Amy fights to clear her cousin's name when three teenagers are killed in a collision with his truck, but learns that he didn't tell the truth about everything. Jonesy and Alex struggle to save Susie from her boyfriend's deceit, but ultimately she rescues herself.
482	25	"Warm Blood"	Richard Frankland	Ted Roberts	27 July 2005
The man who murdered Kelly's father is released from prison and Alex's good nature leaves him ostracised by his workmates and alone in a dark warehouse with a gun at his head. Mark is feeling increasingly isolated and the only one to give him any sympathy is his neighbour, Melanie Anderson.
483	26	"Another Day at the Office Part 1"	Peter Sharp	Jane Allen	3 August 2005
Mark feels guilty when a lost teenage girl is found murdered. Garth Henderson returns and offers Amy a job in his new Cold Case crew, while the case grows stranger and more murder victims are found.
484	27	"Another Day at the Office Part 2"	George Ogilvie	Forrest Redlich	10 August 2005
The net closes on Marie Biden, who turns the tables on Amy and PJ when she traps them in her torture chamber. Amy offers her Cold Case position to PJ, who is left with a difficult decision. Final Appearance of Senior Detective P.J Hasham
485	28	"Last Orders"	Roger Hodgman	Chris Corbett	17 August 2005
Chris attacks a robber breaking into the pub, but things go from bad to worse when Amy arrests her and she finds herself facing bankruptcy and legal action. Alex fights a losing battle with paranoia.
486	29	"Getting the Bullet"	Chris Langman	John Banas	24 August 2005
Alex continues to struggle with paranoia, but things become more desperate when a petty criminal exploits the situation by involving police bureaucracy, further inflaming tensions within the police station.
487	30	"Acid Test"	Peter Sharp	Ysabelle Dean	31 August 2005
On what he believes will be his last day in the job, Joss has an armed confrontation with an escaped prisoner and Alex is left to determine his fate. Amy has doubts about accepting Jonesy as a working partner.
488	31	"One for the Road"	Steve Mann	Ted Roberts	7 September 2005
Mark befriends a young boy, but it turns to tragedy when he breaks a promise to him under duress from his family. Jonesy's first foray as a detective goes horribly wrong when he breaks cover to save a drowning woman.
489	32	"Two Laws"	Grant Brown	Tony Morphett	14 September 2005
Mark agonises over the death of a young boy, leading him to make a hard decision about his future. Jonesy and Amy try to find the culprit when a large marijuana plantation is discovered amid rows of tax-deductible trees. [Final appearance of Mark Jacobs]
490	33	"Good Times"	Chris Langman	Bill Garner	21 September 2005
Tom confronts his past when an old army mate confesses to a 30-year-old homicide. Constable Matt Graham arrives in town with a secretive nature and a cloud over his head. Susie finally manages to exert her authority as Acting Sergeant, but the powers that be have another rude shock in store.
491	34	"Bad Fortune"	Fiona Banks	Michaeley O'Brien	28 September 2005
Kelly and Matt rescue a grateful young girl, Estelle White, from the bottom of a cliff. Amy and Jonesy investigate when a recent lottery winner is found bashed and near death on the side of the road.
492	35	"Child's Play"	Steve Mann	Forrest Redlich	5 October 2005
Amy and Jonesy investigate the murder of a teenage girl the morning after the school formal, only to find that the suspects seem to care more about the impression their stories have on the police rather than the fact they have killed. Kelly endures the over-attentiveness of Estelle.
493	36	"Facing the Music"	Grant Brown	Jeff Truman	12 October 2005
Alex struggles with Matt's black and white approach to justice when a teacher is assaulted by his student. Kelly tries to sever ties with her stalker, but finds that the obsession is just beginning.
494	37	"Too Close"	Raymond Quint	James Dunbar and John Banas	19 October 2005
Matt's service in East Timor complicates his dealings with a young man who is found robbing a video store. Estelle's obsession places Kelly's life in danger and the others must find her before it's too late.
495	38	"Promises, Promises"	Peter Sharp	Jo Kasch	26 October 2005
As Amy and Jonesy investigate a grisly murder, Matt forges ahead with his own line of inquiry. Amy is faced with the prospect that one of their own has crossed the line when Matt's prime suspect is found murdered.
496	39	"Slaying the Demons"	Aarne Neemer	John Banas	2 November 2005
Matt's military past is revealed as he is investigated over the murder. Kelly makes a serious error in judgement, leading to a showdown with her number one fan. Amy grudgingly notes Jonesy's potential as a detective.
497	40	"Keeping Up Appearances"	George Ogilvy	Ysabelle Dean	12 November 2005
With Jonesy away at Detective Training School, Amy finds good help hard to find, while Matt and Amy both come to the same conclusion. Joss relentlessly pursues a minor burglary, determined to prove it is a front for a major art theft.
498	41	"Face Value"	Peter Sharp	Tony Morphett	16 November 2005
Jonesy finds that being a detective is harder than he thought when a woman alleges she was raped under general anaesthetic. Amy's investigation closes in on a sleazy orderly, until a second victim accuses a respected plastic surgeon.
499	42	"Lost & Found"	Ray Quint	Tony Morphett	16 November 2005
Amy closes in on Dr. Nelson, only to find that he turns the tables on her just as she is about to put him away. A young boy arrives in Mount Thomas, claiming that his father is a member of the Mount Thomas police.

== DVD release ==
Season Twelve of Blue Heelers was released on Thursday, 4 November 2010

The Complete Twelfth Season
Set Details	Special Features
28 Episodes (1304 Mins.); Episodes: 429-456; 8 Discs; 16:9 Widescreen Aspect Ratio; English (Dolby Digital 2.0 Stereo)	Blue Heelers: Live Episode.
Release Dates	Blue Heelers: Live Episode.
Australia	Blue Heelers: Live Episode.
4 November 2010	Blue Heelers: Live Episode.
