= Blue Heelers season 11 =

Blue Heelers
- Season 11
- Starring: Simone McAullay; Ditch Davey; Jane Allsop; Paul Bishop; Julie Nihill; Martin Sacks; John Wood
- No. of episodes: 39

Release
- Original network: Seven Network
- Original release: 4 February – 5 November 2004

Season chronology
- ← Previous; Season 10 Next → Season 12

The eleventh season of the Australian police-drama Blue Heelers premiered on the Seven Network on 4 February 2004 and aired on Wednesday nights at 8:30 PM. The 39-episode season concluded 5 November 2004. The core of the main cast remained from previous seasons, with only Caroline Craig as Tess Gallagher departing. There were also several new additions to the main cast, with Geoff Morrell as Mark Jacobs, Rachel Gordon as Amy Fox, Samantha Tolj as Kelly O'Rourke, and Danny Raco as Joss Peroni all being introduced. Like the previous season, the eleventh season was released on DVD as a two part combination set on 5 August 2010.

== Overview ==
The programme suffered along with the Seven Networks as a whole, its ratings in a dire state. 2004 became the year in which the producers took a radical approach to shake up their show. The 39-episode 11th season saw the programme start the year closer to the low end of the weekly top 50 - and sometimes out of it altogether. However, when storylines heated up towards June/July, the numbers did too, and the programme enjoyed an amicable ratings performance thereon in 2005. On 21 April 2004 Blue Heelers aired a special event: a live episode. While Paul Bishop did not appear due to film commitments, this theatre-esque event drew large ratings and was the first step made in attempting to draw viewers back to the show. The broadcast hit nearly 1.6 million viewers in April, helping Seven to narrowly win the No. 1 spot for the night; but, it failed to resurrect the numbers for the show as Seven had hoped.

This was followed by the overhaul of the show. Its 440th episode, "End of Innocence", aired on 6 July 2004 and saw a new family in town being suspected of ghastly crimes. The Baxter family terrorised Clancy, Jo, Tom and Grace, and shortly thereafter the terror became reality when the station was blown up and Clancy and Jo were killed. Soon after, Grace was found raped and murdered.

Nick Schultz, now in Homicide, returned to investigate, and soon learned that Tom had changed as a result of these events, and was now much harsher and determined to gain vengeance on the Baxters. Four new cops arrived on the scene - the smart Detective Senior Constable Amy Fox, family man Sergeant Mark Jacobs, and ambitious rival trainees, Probationary Constables Kelly O'Rourke and Joss Peroni (whose birthdays just happen to be on the same day). In episode 445, "Checkmate", Barry Baxter was sent to jail for the terror attacks, and Nick departed Mount Thomas leaving his colleagues to face their new situation. The ratings picked up significantly during this time.

In the final episodes of the season, a series of attempts on Tom's life saw him suspect Tarni Baxter (Melissa Andersen), the jailed Baxter's daughter. Although there was no proof against her, the closing moments of the season finale saw a crazy-with-rage Tom attempting to drown Tarni in a river.

While some critics and fans were concerned at the new soap opera style that Blue Heelers had embraced, ratings remained high for the rest of the season. This season saw the old opening credits replaced with a new version adopting a more modern tone for the start of seasons 11, 12, and 13.

== Casting ==
=== Main ===
- John Wood as Senior sergeant Tom Croydon
- Julie Nihill as Christine "Chris" Riley
- Martin Sacks as Senior detective Patrick Joseph "P.J." Hasham
- Paul Bishop as Sergeant Benjamin "Ben" Stewart
- Jane Allsop as Senior Constable Joanna "Jo" Parrish
- Ditch Davey as Constable Evan 'Jonesy' Jones
- Simone McAullay as Constable Susie Raynor
- Geoff Morrell as Sergeant Mark Jacobs
- Rachel Gordon as Detective senior constable Amy Fox
- Samantha Tolj as Probationary constable Kelly O'Rourke
- Danny Raco as Probationary constable Joss Peroni

=== Recurring ===
- Jonathan Brooks as Luke Darcy
- Heidi Arena as Marissa Craddock
- Marcus Eyre as Detective sergeant Paul Donald
- Adam Palmer as Senior detective Eddie Turnbull
- Jeremy Kewley as Tony Timms
- Natasha Pincus as Deniz Gulmez
- Peter Stefanou as Dr. Mehmet Gulmez
- Peta Doodson as Inspector Monica Draper
- Adam May as Ellis Corby

=== Guest stars ===
- Charles "Bud" Tingwell as Charles Shaw
- Nicki Paull
- Bernard Curry
- Lesley Baker
- Eliza Taylor-Cotter
- Danny Adcock
- Alan Hopgood
- Daniela Duspara
- Frankie J. Holden
- Simon Westaway
- Luke Hemsworth
- Jeremy Lindsay Taylor

== Reception ==
The season had an average of 1.4 million viewers until the halfway through, where it spiked up to a weekly 1.6 million viewers.

== Episodes ==
No. overall	No. in season	Title	Directed by	Written by	Australian air date
419	1	"Retribution Part 1"	Roger Hodgman	Michaeley O'Brien	4 February 2004
Luke Darcy returns to Mount Thomas, and seems to be a changed man. But Jo takes the bullet when he attacks her.
420	2	"Retribution Part 2"	Peter Sharp	Bill Garner	11 February 2004
P.J is accused of murder.
421	3	"The Right Thing"	Declan Eames	Ysabelle Dean	18 February 2004
Rivalry runs rampant between Chris and her opponent in the lead up to council elections.
422	4	"Happily Ever After"	Chris Adshead	Jenny Lewis	25 February 2004
Ben faces a dilemma when he and his fiancée Marissa search for two homeless kids.
423	5	"Heirs Apparent"	Chris Langman	David Allen	3 March 2004
When Susie finds herself escorting a pet alpaca to a funeral.
424	6	"A Mere Formality"	George Ogilvie	Ted Roberts	10 March 2004
Ben and Susie face the inquest into Brad's death.
425	7	"Cast the First Stone"	Kath Hayden	Tony Morphett	17 March 2004
Two girls in band fight over their music teacher. *Note*: Kia Luby guest stars as Romy Deeble. Kia Luby previously co-starred on The Saddle Club.
426	8	"Great Expectations"	Steve Mann	Dave Worthington; John Banas	24 March 2004
Tom has a black eye, PJ and Jo are in a foul temper after a bush walk goes wrong.
427	9	"Off Your Face"	Chris Langman	John Banas	31 March 2004
Susie and Evan find a young boy near death during a spate of alcohol robberies at the Imperial. Evan hires someone to help at the pub while Chris is laid up.
428	10	"Running Scared"	Chris Hayden	Mary McCormick	7 April 2004
A woman who works out at the same gym as Susie and Jo is raped, and Jo shows up on a questionable website, taking off her uniform in public. She sets herself up as a target to find out who is committing the attacks, but finds that she is not the next one in his sights. Will the coppers find the correct target in time?
429	11	"Mind Wide Open"	Raymond Quint	Michaeley O'Brien	14 April 2004
PJ and Jo take a trip to see the new constable who took over the station in Widgeree. They end up investigating alien abductions.
430	12	"Reasonable Doubt"	Aarne Neeme	Tony Morphett	21 April 2004
This episode of Blue Heelers went to air LIVE. The Blue Heelers revisit a child's murder after the suspect's trial is concluded. Tensions run high amongst the officers, as well as the townspeople. Alibis come into question, but who is telling the truth when everyone seems to be lying? Constables Jones and Raynor find time for a romantic moment just before shots ring out at the station. NOTE: This episode is not included in the original DVD release. However, it is included in the ViaVision release as a special feature.
431	13	"On the Inside"	Chris Adshead	Bill Garner	28 April 2004
The Heelers investigate some strange happenings at an all ladies prison. *Note* Louis Corbett guest stars. Louis later joins the cast in Season 14 as Acting Sergeant Alex Kirby's son Rory.
432	14	"Secrets and Lies"	Jeffrey Walker	Ysabelle Dean	5 May 2004
Jo reopens the case of a missing teenager when his mother claims to have seen him in the dead of the night.
433	15	"Yesterday's Hero"	Chris Langman	David Boutland	12 May 2004
A former AFL player for the Hawthorn Hawks is robbed.
434	16	"The Cull"	Kath Hayden	David Allen	19 May 2004
Susie and Evan make the horrifying discovery of about 50 dead kangaroos.
435	17	"Life of the Party – Part 1"	Chris Adshead	Ted Roberts	2 June 2004
Jonesy and Susie head to the site of an ecstasy overdose.
436	18	"Life of the Party Part 2"	Steve Mann	Tony Morphett	9 June 2004
Dylan dies of an ecstasy overdose.
437	19	"The Family Way"	Chris Langman	Chris Corbett	16 June 2004
A middle aged doctor is murdered on the morning he is supposed to give testimony.
438	20	"Payback"	Fiona Banks	John Banas	23 June 2004
Susie accidentally shoots Ben while investigating a break in.
439	21	"Echoes"	Steve Mann	Maureen Sherlock	30 June 2004
P.J does everything in his power to prove that Maggie wasn't wrong, much to Jo's displeasure. Jo calls off her engagement to P.J. Lisa McCune appears as Maggie Doyle in flashback scenes.
440	22	"End of Innocence"	Chris Langman	Bill Garner	6 July 2004
The Mount Thomas Police Station is bombed and, while Tom just escapes the blast, Jo and Clancy are killed. Final Appearance of Senior Constable Jo Parrish
441	23	"Headless Chooks"	Chris Adshead	Bill Roberts	14 July 2004
The Heelers are running around like headless chooks after the bombing of the Mount Thomas police station and the team has to deal with the tragic death of their colleague, Jo Parrish, and with the death of 'the superman', Clancy Freeman. Inspector Falcon-Price arrives on the scene as well as Sergeant Nick Schultz who returns to Mount Thomas as part of the Homicide Squad to investigate the bombing. The team goes into overdrive trying to find Grace and the station bomber while Tom, seriously injured and fed up with the lack of effort his team is putting into finding Grace, discharges himself from the hospital and helps in the search; he finds Grace's body lying in a creek on the Holstein property, the Holsteins being relatives of suspect, Cal Milic. But, Grace's body was found only 1 km from the Baxter house and Tom is determined to get the Baxters for what they'd done, although there is no evidence that points to Barry Baxter or any of his sons. Mount Thomas also gets two new members: Sergeant Mark Jacobs, whom the Inspector promises Tom's job to, and new addition to the CI team, Det. Snr. Const. Amy Fox, not immediately fitting in very well. The episode concludes with Tom, against all advice, taking a drive alone to see the Baxters. When he returns he reports that only Troy Baxter was home and "He's met with an unfortunate accident, he's dead". What are the team to think? What had Tom done? First Appearances of Sergeant Mark Jacobs and Detective Senior Constable Amy Fox
442	24	"A Time For Mourning"	Peter Sharp	Ysabelle Dean	21 July 2004
The Heelers receive the autopsy report on Grace Curtis revealing she was beaten and raped before being tossed into the river and drowning because of exhaustion. This intensifies the search for the rapist and murderer when another rape victim is discovered within circumstances almost identical to those of the rape of Grace Curtis. An old man thinks he has been robbed when a cigar box containing money disappears from his house; Joss is assigned to be his "bodyguard" for a day. Amy still struggles to fit in with the C.I. branch at Mount Thomas and, with all the happenings, tension within the station grows as everybody is still having trouble coming to terms with the deaths of Jo, Clancy and Grace. The team also begin furnishing their new station but, it is not as easy as you'd think and ends in an eruption of still raw emotions. Probationary Constables Kelly O'Rourke and Joss Peroni arrive at Mount Thomas. Tom continues his vendetta against the Baxters while Barry Baxter still very much blames Tom for the death of his boy, Troy. Tom seems to be getting in too deep and is becoming withdrawn from everybody else, not to mention extremely moody and angry with everything and everyone. A wake is held for Jo, Clancy and Grace at The Imperial and Tom's emotions get the better of him when he assaults Barry Baxter. First Appearances of Constable Kelly O'Rourke and Constable Joss Peroni
443	25	"Pigs Will Fly"	George Ogilvie	Deb Parsons	28 July 2004
The Mount Thomas police receive a bomb threat in the form of a letter and, later a fake bomb is left in the station causing a total evacuation and the attendance of the Bomb Squad. The fake-bomber later demanded $50,000 or he would really bomb the station; the fake bomb turns out to be tomato soup left by a former parking-inspector in need of money. Barry Baxter makes a complaint about being assaulted by Tom and Chris lies for him, claiming that Baxter started the fight. A still bitter Tom returns to the site of Grace's car and discovers her car's distributor cap. This is found to have none of Milic's fingerprints, thus eliminating him as a suspect for Grace's rape and murder. Chris has a brick thrown through her window, missing her by inches and a woman on speed throws an ashtray at Chris, over 40 cents for a phone call. Kelly and Joss attend a break-in fearing an armed-offender only to discover that the offender was actually a joey which jumped through a window. Ben and Susie share a comforting kiss in the tea room and are discovered by Jonsey. Cal Milic, fed up with being hounded by reporters and the police, commits suicide; taking his 7-year-old daughter with him.
444	26	"Life Goes On"	Grant Brown	Michael Brindley	4 August 2004
In an attempt to solve the rape of Grace Curtis, the Heelers interrupt Troy Baxter's funeral to get a DNA sample. Tom (against all orders) also attends, and takes great delight in taunting Barry by telling him that Troy wasn't his son. When the DNA tests arrive at the station, they reveal that it truly was Troy Baxter that raped Grace Curtis. Kelly and Joss are in hot water when their attempt to apprehend a criminal demanding cigarettes turns out wrong and the shop attendant is on the receiving end of Kelly's pepper spray. Another victim of bad speed is found in Mount Thomas and the team suspects that the Baxters are behind it. A 15-year-old girl is found by Evan and Susie in the women's toilets giving birth to a baby. Susan is nearly killed when a 4WD ploughs through her bedroom wall. Tom decides it isn't safe for her in Mount Thomas and forces her to move out of the area. Tom becomes more bitter and aggressive towards everyone and denies help from anyone. Susie and Ben's relationship may be going places and Jonesy is having trouble dealing with it.
445	27	"Checkmate"	Chris Adshead	Alison Nisselle	11 August 2004
In this episode, the net finally closes in on the Baxters. Their speed manufacturing operation is proved and they are charged. It is also finally revealed that it was Barry Baxter that was responsible for the bombing of the station. He is charged as a result of his son Matt's admission. The Heelers find that he purchased the explosives from Doc Parkinson, whose warehouse is later found engulfed in fire. The team also farewell Det. Sgt. Schultz as he returns to Melbourne.
446	28	"Don't Call Me Baby"	Peter Sharp	John Banas	1 September 2004
Despite allegations by her ex-boyfriend Theo that she isn't all she appears to be. Evan is thrashed when Donna is kidnapped and everyone is looking at Theo for answers. Kelly dates the doctor that tended to her injuries, only to find out that he's much too young to do some of the things he says he's done. Joss dates the victim of neighbor-harassment, but is she only in it for what his uniform can do for her? Susie cancels a date with Ben because she's tired after a rough day, but ends up at hospital, at Evan's bedside all night.
447	29	"Bring It On"	Jeffrey Walker	Chris Corbett	8 September 2004
Jonesy finds his career on the line as he attempts to protect Donna. In the meantime, Donna is found, shrouded in a cloud of suspicion. Susie keeps trying to let Ben down easy, but it's not sinking in.
448	30	"Pillow Talk"	Grant Brown	Michaeley O'Brien	15 September 2004
Jonesy is stunned when Donna tells him that the people who hired Theo to kill Hugo Allen were in fact the police of st. david's.
449	31	"Out of Love"	Chris Langman	Tony Morphett	22 September 2004
Hugo Allen is found dead while Jonesy is shot and Donna disappears.
450	32	"Turf War"	Peter Sharp	Tony Morphett; Bill Garner	29 September 2004
The corrupt cop at Mt Davis is revealed.
451	33	"Away Games"	Steve Mann	Jenny Lewis	6 October 2004
Mt. Thomas is inundated by a group of footballers, and it isn't long before a young girl is gang raped causing Tom's stepson Daniel to become the main suspect. Jonesy is held hostage when a guy points a nail gun to his head. Ben ends up in a familiar situation where he has to shoot someone in order save a colleague. He can't find the heart to do it so he quite literally walks away. Disobeying an order and almost losing a friend makes Ben do some hard thinking about the job and his colleagues' trust which puts him on the brink of suicide as his depression reaches breaking point, causing him to put his gun to his head. He later saddles up for the country road. Final Appearance of Sergeant Ben Stewart
452	34	"Special Treatment"	Kath Hayden	Ted Roberts	13 October 2004
As the rape investigation continues, Inspector Draper arrives in town.
453	35	"Too Late To Say Sorry"	Chris Langman	Ysabelle Dean	20 October 2004
Sgt. Roy Holland (played by Marty Fields) arrives in town and Joss takes the opportunity to get on his good side.
454	36	"One of the Boys"	Peter Sharp	Maureen Sherlock	27 October 2004
Kelly has no problem dealing with a straightforward case, until she discovers something shocking about the perpetrator. Roy continues to treat Kelly unfairly.
455	37	"A Helping Hand"	Roger Hodgman	Max Singer	3 November 2004
Kelly's rejection of Sgt. Holland sees him treating her badly and continually giving her abuse.
456	38	"Tit for Tat"	Steve Mann	John Banas	10 November 2004
Joss attempts to break things off with Fay Tudor but she doesn't agree. Tarni Baxter returns to get her brother's car. She's out for revenge, along with her new boyfriend, Ryan Decker, and starts playing a deadly game with Tom. Roy gets his comeuppence, and then some, after seducing a wild 15-year-old girl. Is Tom the victim of suicide, murder, or mistaken identity?
457	39	"Crash Site"	George Ogilvie	Michaeley O'Brien	17 November 2004
PJ has finally admitted that the old Tom and the new Tom are very different people. He believes that the old Tom is on his way back. Tarni Baxter continues to taunt Tom, who is pushed to the edge by her, leading him to do something shocking. Will Tarni sink or swim?

== DVD release ==
Season 11 Parts 1 and 2 was released on 5 August 2010.

The Complete 11th Season (Parts 1+2)
Set Details	Special Features
TBA Episodes (TBA Mins.); Episodes: TBA; 10-Disc Set; 16:9 Widescreen Aspect Ratio; English (Dolby Digital 2.0 Stereo)	Slipcase Packaging
Release Dates	Slipcase Packaging
Australia	Slipcase Packaging
5 August 2010	Slipcase Packaging
