= Blue Heelers season 13 =

Blue Heelers
- Season 13
- Blue Heelers final cast of 2006
- Starring: Matthew Holmes; Charlie Clausen; Danny Raco; Samantha Tolj; Rachel Gordon; Simone McAullay; Ditch Davey; Julie Nihill; John Wood
- No. of episodes: 11

Release
- Original network: Seven Network
- Original release: 1 April – 4 June 2006

Season chronology
- ← Previous; Season 12

The thirteenth and final season of the Australian police drama Blue Heelers premiered on the Seven Network on 1 April 2006 and aired on Saturday nights at 8:30 pm. The 11-episode season concluded 4 June 2006, due to its cancellation by the Seven Network as a result of its sharp decline in ratings. When, in late 2005, the time came to renew Blue Heelers, Seven commissioned eleven further episodes to be produced, but its future after this was still undecided.

In January 2006, Seven officially announced that they had cancelled Blue Heelers, but would air a final shortened season of only 11 episodes in mid-2006, the 11 episodes which had been filmed in late 2005, before Blue Heelers had been cancelled.

This season focuses primarily on the show's main protagonist, Senior Sergeant Tom Croydon, his failing health and his personal troubles. John Wood, who portrays Croydon, is the only actor to appear in every episode of Blue Heelers and is, indisputably, the pillar of the show. The final episode of the thirteenth season aired as a 2-hour, movie-length tribute starting with an introduction from John Wood, and concluding with a compilation of Blue Heelers moments from over its 13-season run. For this thirteenth season, Blue Heelers was moved from its primetime Wednesday-night timeslot to the lower rating Saturday-night timeslot, which saw it come up against The Bill, a British police drama which has become quite popular in Australia. Ratings for this season, partially due to the series' move to its lower-rating timeslot, were relatively low; ratings were around the 1.2 million viewer mark, increasing to 1.5 million for the finale. Blue Heelers failed to even make it into the top 20 programmes at any time during its thirteenth season.

This season was very successful in regards of awards, particularly for John Wood who won the Gold Logie for Most Popular Personality on Australian Television, as well as the Most Popular Actor Silver Logie Award. Wood had been nominated for the Gold Logie for ten straight years, and finally won it in 2006. By the end of this season, Blue Heelers had also equalled the record for most episodes produced of a television drama in Australia, equalling Homicide's record, set in 1977.

All 11 episodes of the season made their subscription television premiere on 26 January 2011 (Australia Day), where they aired back to back in an Australia Day marathon on the Universal Channel.

== Cast ==
For this season, the producers made the choice to make no changes to the main cast, all of whom featured in all eleven episodes of the season.

=== Main ===
- John Wood as Senior Sergeant Tom Croydon
- Julie Nihill as Christine "Chris" Riley
- Ditch Davey as Detective Senior Constable (Senior Detective) Evan "Jonesy" Jones
- Simone McAullay as Senior Constable Susie Raynor
- Rachel Gordon as Detective Senior Constable (Senior Detective) Amy Fox
- Samantha Tolj as Constable Kelly O'Rourke
- Danny Raco as Constable Joss Peroni
- Charlie Clausen as Acting Sergeant Alex Kirby
- Matthew Holmes as Constable Matt Graham

=== Recurring ===
- Louis Corbett as Rory Hayes, Kirby's son
- Stephanie Millar as Dr. Sophie Ash
- Neil Pigot as Inspector Russell Falcon-Price
- Joshua Lawson as David Murray

=== Guest stars ===
- Roy Billing as Ian Goss
- Ian Roberts as Wayne Rhodes
- Jacinta Stapleton as Tilda Dean
- Bernard Curry as Andrew Gilfillan
- Elly Varrenti as Angela Peroni, Joss' mum
- Kane Alexander as Roger Armstrong
- Spencer McLaren as Gary Harding
- Marcus Graham as Pilgrim Bond
- Damian Walshe-Howling as Adam Cooper
- Peta Doodson as Inspector Monica Draper

== Plot ==
Due to Tom's illness, Falcon-Price takes over the operation of the station and the team must deal with his constant presence and the pressure which they are put under. Falcon-Price's constant attempts to prove that Tom is not up to his job have also grown more intense at Tom's initial sign of weakness. We see that Alex is having trouble dealing with his new role as a father, and, on top of this, Alex is stabbed by a criminal, and this begins to look as if it is all Tom's fault. The two rivals, Kelly and Joss, enter into new romances: Joss with a pickpocket victim and Kelly with a rival lawyer. They must deal with their constant jealousy of each other and their constant drive to outdo each other, as it had been ever since they left the Academy. Joss must also deal with his growing gambling debts and the consequences of these, including his being beaten up, his being forced to get a second job and his becoming homeless. He must also deal with the people around him who, in trying to help him, make him feel worse; particularly the arrival of his mother in town. Dismissed police officer Adam Cooper also arrives back in Mount Thomas, for the first time since Tom dismissed him in 1998. This time he arrives in Mount Thomas as a photocopier technician and wants to take revenge on Tom. In an attempt to do this, he tries to frame him for a crime he did not commit. In the heat of these allegations against Mount Thomas' top cop, there is the very real possibility that the Mount Thomas police station may be closed forever, and the team are forced to find new placements and the possibility of separation from one another.

== Production ==
The season premiered on 1 April 2006, with the show's 500th episode - "Only The Lonely". The network chose to discount the season premiere as an episode and instead chose to advertise the season premiere as episode 499 and promoted the next episode - "Boss" - as the monumental 500th episode. This episode focuses largely on Tom Croydon battling the news that he has cancer.

The cast finished filming their final episode for 2005 on 20 December, aware that the show's future was the subject of discussion, but at this point the show had not been cancelled. To prepare for the possibility of cancellation, two alternate endings for the show were filmed in 2005 for a possible series finale in 2006. One ending was left open ended, to serve as a lead-in to a possible 14th season, the other ending wrapped up all the show's storylines. The cast were on their New Year non-rating period hiatus when they were told of Blue Heelers' cancellation. Thus, the eleven final episodes the cast had filmed in late 2005 were to be used for the 2006 season. For the series finale, the latter ending, wrapping up the show's storylines was used. Although rather than completely wrapping everything up, the producers made it possible to resume from where they left off, should Seven decide to start producing Blue Heelers again.

The 2-hour series finale, titled "One Day More", aired on Sunday 4 June 2006 in a prime-time slot, at 8:30 pm. The finale focuses on Tom's attempts to reconnect with his family, and recover from his debilitating illness, whilst dealing with criminal charges brought against him by a vengeful ex-officer as well as the fact that the Mount Thomas police station, which he loves so dearly, may be closed down. It also features the return of former cast member Damian Walshe-Howling, reprising his role as Adam Cooper, still very bitter about his treatment by Tom. Rather than ending in "a hail of bullet or a bomb explosion", the producers wanted to give the record-breaking series a gentle and fitting farewell to celebrate its life - "We did not want to blow everyone up," producer Gus Howard said, "It is a gentle grounding. It felt like the right thing to do.".

This season also marked the time when Blue Heelers matched the record for "most episodes produced in an Australian weekly primetime drama", equalling Homicide's record, which was set in 1977. Blue Heelers did not, however match the "total airtime on television" record. This record was also set by Homicide in 1977. This record stands at 516 hours whilst Blue Heelers is just shy of the record at 511 hours.

== Reception ==
In Blue Heelers' twelfth season, ratings were at an all-time low of 1.2 million viewers per episode, which was less than half what the show had been attracting during its peak from 1997 to 2000, when it was drawing more than 2.5 million viewers. After these falling ratings during 2005, Seven decided to take action and considered cancelling the series altogether. However, before doing this, they commissioned a shortened season consisting of only 11 episodes, taking the show's episode tally to 510. This season was shortened from the normal season length of around 40 episodes.

On 13 January 2006, the network ended months of speculation when they officially cancelled the series. The news was broken by television critic Robert Fidgeon on radio station 3AW, and was shortly followed by the official announcement which appeared on the front-page of nearly all of Australia's major newspapers including The Sydney Morning Herald, Sydney's Daily Telegraph, The Melbourne Herald Sun, The Melbourne Age and Brisbane's Courier Mail.

For this thirteenth season, Seven chose to move Blue Heelers from its Wednesday-night, primetime timeslot, which it had occupied for 10 years, to the lower-rating Saturday night timeslot, which also saw it up against popular British police programme The Bill and Network Ten's Australian Football League (AFL) coverage; this move was slammed by cast member John Wood. Ratings for this season were generally low; no episode ranked in OzTAM's top 20 programme list for the week.

The final episode, "One Day More", achieved 1,512,000 viewers in the five major Australian cities: Melbourne, Sydney, Perth, Adelaide and Brisbane. Whilst enough to justify a Sunday primetime slot, it was still a very low rating figure and was not enough for Seven to justify the continued production of the programme, which was estimated at costing them almost $500 000 per episode to produce. Additionally, more "reality-type" programmes such as Border Security which cost $100 000 to produce and package were achieving record numbers of viewers as high as 2 million per episode; Blue Heelers had not had 2 million viewers for over 5 years.

== Awards ==
In 2006, John Wood was once again nominated for the most coveted television award in Australia, the Gold Logie for Most Popular Personality on Australian Television. In 2006, Wood finally won this award, which had eluded him every year since 1997. This could be partially attributed to the magnitude of support thrown behind Wood in his bid for the publicly chosen award: Nova 100's Michelle Anderson, for example, ran a campaign and had T-shirts made up in his honour stating: "Ten years, it's high time the pillar of society and acting god that is John Wood be rewarded with gold."; even Victoria's top-cop, Victoria Police Chief Commissioner Christine Nixon, threw her support behind Wood in his bid for the Gold. As well as this prestigious award, Wood was also privileged to win the Silver Logie for Most Popular Actor, which he had won in 2005 and had been nominated for a further 6 times, over thirteen years, for his role as Tom Croydon on Blue Heelers. At the 2006 Logies, Wood was also nominated for Most Outstanding Actor in a drama series and Blue Heelers was nominated for Most Popular Australian Drama series. Most Outstanding Actor went to Dan Wyllie from Love My Way and Most Popular Drama went to Home and Away.

At the 2006 Australian Film Institute (AFI) Awards, Blue Heelers was nominated for Best Television Drama Series, but this award went to Love My Way. Guests actors on the show, Marcus Graham and Saskia Burmeister, however, were nominated for, and won, Best Guest or Supporting Actor and Actress in Television Drama, respectively. Graham was nominated for his role in "Moonlighting" (episode 508), while Burmeister was nominated for her role in a season twelve episode.

== Episodes ==
| No. overall | No. in season | Title | Directed by | Written by | Australian air date |
|---|---|---|---|---|---|
| 500 | 1 | "Only the Lonely" | Fiona Banks | Bill Garner | 1 April 2006 |
Tom, who is not well and is trying to hide it from his colleagues, meets an old friend who has been caught shoplifting and discovers that he was trying to please his ten-year-old daughter who is dying from leukaemia. Tom continues to refuse to see a doctor. Alex is struggling with the idea of being a father, and is further discouraged when his son, Rory, goes missing and is feared kidnapped by gunmen who've been taking shots at uniformed police officers. Finally, the Heelers find that the gunman was taking revenge on the police for the death of his son.
| 501 | 2 | "Boss" | Chris Langman | Michaeley O'Brien | 8 April 2006 |
The Heelers are concerned about Tom's health and, despite Amy's nagging, Tom is still very reluctant to see a doctor and denies claims that he is unwell. In the midst of this, Tom becomes personally involved in the case of a young boy who is being bullied and tormented by his peers; this forces Tom to reminisce about his troubles as a child. Matt helps an old colleague of Tom's when he arrives at the station seeking help with an old case.
| 502 | 3 | "Dirt" | George Ogilvie | Stuart Page | 15 April 2006 |
Tom's health is further declining and he finally gives in to Amy's persistence and opens up to her. Jonesy and Alex become mixed up in a mysterious cult after they find a baby's remains in a firepit in the national park. Alex continues to struggle with the idea of fatherhood and is further discouraged when he makes a mistake that lands Rory in hospital. An elderly man is arrested for shoplifting various items which he intends to give to his girlfriend.
| 503 | 4 | "What's Love Got to Do with It" | Peter Sharp | John Banas | 22 April 2006 |
Tom secretly goes to Melbourne to receive treatment for his cancer, confiding only in Amy. Kelly, becoming uneasy about Tom's disappearance, consults Amy who ensures her Tom is out innocently fishing. Following Tom's disappearance, Inspector Falcon-Price gleefully takes over the operation of the station and also becomes suspicious about Tom's whereabouts, finally deciding to question Kelly. Amy begins to get frustrated when the Inspector does his utmost best to hinder her case of a brutal home invasion and assault. When hers and the Inspector's opinions begin to differ, Amy finds herself taken off the case. Alex, in a bid to keep Rory hidden from the Inspector, sends him out on the road with Susie and is terrified when he again goes missing.
| 504 | 5 | "Affluenza" | Chris Ashead | Kylie Needham; John Banas | 29 April 2006 |
Joss comes up with yet another money-making scheme and catches the gambling bug when a pickpocket victim he and Kelly help gives him a winning tip. Jonesy looks into a string of assaults at the local racetrack. Alex and Matt disagree when Alex plans to let a businessman slide on a shoplifting charge and Matt wants to play things by the book. Matt continually maintains that the shoplifter is planning something bigger and even goes to the extent of investigating him on his day off. After his treatment, Tom is forced to accept help from good friends as he recovers from his operation.
| 505 | 6 | "Going Down Swinging" | Chris Langman | Samantha Winston | 6 May 2006 |
Falcon-Price is still at Mount Thomas and, after realising the extent of Tom's bad health, orders him out on the road as Divisional Patrol Supervisor, seeing a chance to get rid of Tom by proving he is not fit for active duty. It looks as if this is true when Alex is stabbed by an escaped offender and it looks as if Tom is to blame. Falcon-Price convinces Alex to have Tom brought before the Medical Officer and, when Alex agrees, Falcon-Price uses this as ammunition to get Tom out of the force; but gets it blown up back in his face. Meanwhile, Jonesy and Amy have difficulty finding their suspect and Kelly's jealousy is showing when she tries to find some negative information about Joss's new girlfriend.
| 506 | 7 | "Burning Up" | George Ogilvie | Ysabelle Dean | 13 May 2006 |
Joss's mother arrives in Mount Thomas and reveals she is worried about Joss's money habits. Joss reveals he has a gambling problem. While investigating a series of arsons, Kelly gets involved with a lawyer but questions the relationship when it comes to their conflicting interests in differing senses of ethic.
| 507 | 8 | "Down to Earth" | Grant Brown | Ted Roberts; John Banas | 20 May 2006 |
The Heelers investigate the suspicious downing of a crop dusting plane, suspecting sabotage; they just do not count of the number of suspects. Everyone is concerned that Joss has lost his nerve when he fails to back Kelly up during two incidents. Joss's gambling problems are increasing and his gambling problems start to affect his work. When he is left homeless, Kelly offers him accommodation. Again, Kelly is having problems with her new lawyer boyfriend and the ethical problems that their relationship is presenting. Alex fears for his son when he provides evidence about a robbery. Alex also fears Rory has a crush on Susie, or even worse, that Susie is the one with a crush.
| 508 | 9 | "Moonlighting" | Martin Sacks | Tony Morphett | 27 May 2006 |
Joss's gambling debts peak; in an attempt to pay them off, he takes a second job as a cab driver. He is presented with a once only opportunity for easy money when a high roller offers him a job as a getaway driver. Amy and Jonesy investigate the murder of a client of Joss's and link it to an armed robbery and Joss's high roller client. Following this, Joss is taken hostage and it becomes a race against time to save him. Kelly's relationship is again tested when she and her boyfriend are again on opposing sides of a case.
| 509 | 10 | "One Day More – Part 1" | Fiona Banks | Stuart Page | 4 June 2006 |
Amy and Even are attempting an undercover operating when their cover is blown and Matt is almost shot. Tom is still battling with, and coming to terms with, his cancer and knows that he should be taking his time and renewing ties with his estranged family. He is distracted when disgraced former police-officer Adam Cooper arrives in Mount Thomas, as a photocopier technician. Cooper, who was dismissed by Tom for corruption, attempts to frame Tom and accuses him of illegally selling stolen firearms following the bombing of the former Mount Thomas police station; these are accusations that Inspector Falcon-Price is gleeful to hear and he readily accepts them and grants Cooper anything he desires. Tom also helps fellow cancer suffer, Gina, in her final days and Heelers are left to pick up the pieces. Alex and Amy must prepare for Tom's approaching case, which he seems to have no care for at all, and they are stretched to breaking point. After the accusations against Tom, the Inspector announces that the Mount Thomas station is to close and the Heelers start to find new jobs, facing the fact that they must leave Mount Thomas. Finally, Cooper's scheme is foiled, it is announced that the station is to remain open and the Inspector leaves, very disappointed.
| 510 | 11 | "One Day More – Part 2" | Peter Sharp | Tony Morphett | 4 June 2006 |

== Season 13 DVD release ==
Season 13 was released on Thursday, 3 March 2011.

The Complete Thirteenth Season (Parts 1–2)
| Set Details | Special Features |
| TBA Episodes (TBA Mins.); Episodes: 458 - 499; 10 Discs; 16:9 Widescreen Aspect Ratio; English (Dolby Digital 2.0 Stereo) | Slipcase Packaging |
| Release Dates | Slipcase Packaging |
| Australia | Slipcase Packaging |
| Release date 3 March 2011 | Slipcase Packaging |
