= P. J. Hasham =

- Blue Heelers character
- Martin Sacks as P. J. Hasham
- First appearance: "A Woman's Place" (Ep. #1); 18 January 1994
- Last appearance: "Another Day at the Office (Pt. 2)" (Ep. #484); 10 August 2005
- Created by: Hal McElroy and Tony Morphett
- Portrayed by: Martin Sacks

In-universe information
- Full name: Patrick Joseph Hasham
- Occupation: Police officer
- Family: Helena Hasham (mother)
- Significant others: Maggie Doyle – fiancée; Jo Parrish – fiancée
- Children: No children
- Religion: Roman Catholic (non-practising)

Career with Victoria Police
- Position: Mt. Thomas Police Station: Senior Detective; Acting Station Sergeant (briefly); Detective Senior Constable (before 1994)
- Years of service: c. 1986 – present

Patrick Joseph "P. J." Hasham is a fictional character in the long-running Australian police drama Blue Heelers, portrayed by Martin Sacks. An experienced detective, P. J. was attached to the gaming squad in Melbourne and was eventually disbanded due to corruption. He was transferred to the small country town of Mount Thomas as the only criminal investigator at the local station. Despite his stated preference for staying out of "uniformed matters", he worked far closer with his uniformed colleagues than many visiting detectives, and also preferred to dress down compared to the business dress usually favoured by other detectives. He was the last member of the original cast to leave the show, doing so midway through the twelfth season, and was the third-longest serving character, appearing in 483 of the 510 episodes to air.

== Development and casting ==
The character, then named Nick Schultz, was created by Hal McElroy and Tony Morphett to be the only detective posted to the Mount Thomas Police Station. The character's name was swapped with that of the show's traffic cop, P. J. Hasham, because the producers felt that those names better suited the physicality of the actor chosen. His early characterisation is that of a cowboy detective who has spent most of his career in city postings before being transferred to the bush.

Martin Sacks came to the role as an experienced actor, having first appeared in a bit part in The Love Boat and then in the cast of Australian soap opera The Restless Years. Sacks also had experience acting in Hollywood, but returned to Australia after a few years. After announcing his departure from the show, Sacks admitted that he wasn't keen on the part at first as he didn't think the show would last.

In later years, the death of both of his fiancées, the departure of many of his friends, and the changing attitude of his highly respected boss combine to make Mount Thomas feel like less of a home for P. J., and the character chooses to depart the town for pastures new. His exit storyline, which sees him leave for Melbourne to join the Cold Case Squad, was intended to allow the character to return for future guest roles, but the show ended before this could eventuate.

== Character background ==
In his fictional backstory, the character is the Lebanese Australian son of a store-owner who was born and raised in Melbourne, and has at least two sisters. Although his mother is a staunch Roman Catholic, P. J. gave up on religion when his father was killed. Despite this, he still remembers the teachings well enough to recite part of the rosary when prompted. He remains skeptical of the benefits of faith and religion, something he attributes to his role as a detective.

== Role on Blue Heelers ==
P. J. joined the Victoria Police an unspecified amount of time before the start of the series. During his early career, he was posted to the Fitzroy Station in Melbourne, where he remained living with his mother. About 1988/89, P. J. was serving as a detective on the Regional Gaming Squad when the entire squad was investigated for corruption by the Internal Investigations Division (IID) based on a tip-off from fellow squad member Monica Draper (Peta Doodson). The investigation found no evidence of any wrongdoing from P. J., but he was still transferred to the country town of Mount Thomas where he served as the sole member of the station's Criminal Investigation Branch (CIB).

By 1994, P. J. had settled in to his role at Mount Thomas and had established a comfortable working relationship with the station sergeant, Tom Croydon (John Wood). In February of that year, the annual Mount Thomas Cup brought an array of colourful characters to the town, and provided him with the prospect of settling an old score with Barry Raymond "Apples" Maxwell. A daring daylight attack on a bookie looked like it might be the opening that he's looking for, but the perpetrator turned out to be the younger Maxwell brother. Ultimately, Apples never made it to town, he died in a car accident earlier in the day.

Later in the first season, P. J. was reunited with a former flame when Stock Squad detective Hillary Edmunds (Jennifer Botica) arrived in town to investigate cases of cattle-duffing. After spending an overnight stakeout together watching a stolen prized bull, P. J. was prepared to reignite their romance, only to be let down when Hilary stood him up. Hillary returned again later in the year with her uncle, who hoped to retire to a property he owned in the district, only to find that another farmer was claiming the land as his own under an obscure law. When a building on the property is destroyed by arson, P. J. found himself drawn into the dispute by his relationship with Hillary, whose single-mindedness regarding the case threatened any chance of them learning the truth.

During the second season, P. J. was one of four officers targeted by an IID raid regarding allegations of police involvement in the sale and distribution of drugs. The IID officer assigned to search his house was Monica Draper, the senior sergeant who had reported corruption on the Regional Gaming Squad and had long suspected him of being "on the take". While the investigation was on-going, the news of a crashed prison bus saw P. J. placed back on duty, working with IID to question Susan Croydon (Beth Buchanan) about drugs found during the earlier raids. When Adam Cooper (Damian Walshe-Howling) and Chris Riley (Julie Nihill) are taken hostage in the Imperial Hotel, P. J. joined his colleagues in cordoning off the pub and, after Tom is shot, he took part in the interview of the shooter and the take-down of the escaped prisoners.

Less than three months later, P. J. found himself under investigation by IID again when the local branch of the bank is robbed and the offender fingers him as an accomplice. The investigation was complicated by his mutual animosity with Monica Draper, who was assisting the "toe-cutters" with the inquiry. When his former boss, Peter Grantham (David Glazebrook), arrived at the station to taunt P. J. about the investigation. P.J became suspicious that Grantham was setting him up, and his fears were realised when a search uncovered a portion of the stolen funds in his freezer. With her friend's career on the line, Maggie Doyle (Lisa McCune) approached her father, Pat (Dennis Miller), for help and together they uncovered evidence that Grantham had framed P. J., allowing him to return to duty.

Late in 1996, the return of young offender Luke Darcy (Jonathan Brooks) from the juvenile justice system corresponded to a spike in assaults and thefts, leading the police to investigate the family. The situation came to a head when Nick Schultz (William McInnes) and Adam Cooper responded to a domestic disturbance at the Darcy house, followed shortly by P. J. and Maggie Doyle. Luke had soaked his father in fuel and was threatening him with a cigarette lighter when he was tackled by Nick and Adam. While Luke was struggling with the police, his mother Raelene began threatening P. J.with a machete, saying that they wouldn't take her son away. Backed against a lattice frame, he ordered her to drop the knife, before shooting her three times as she continued to advance towards him.

As the investigation into the shooting began, P. J.'s colleagues were supportive of him, but with the media and the brass clamouring for answers, the investigators from the Homicide Squad were anxious to keep everything above board, to prevent any implication of a cover-up. The situation was made worse by the arrival of journalist Paul Carson, who aired footage of the shooting which appeared to implicate P. J. as a cold-blooded killer and suggested that the shooting was a police reprisal for the murder of Wayne Patterson by Raelene's cousin. During the coronial inquest, P. J. suffered a crisis of confidence on the back of a death-bed confession which put one of his earliest convictions in Mount Thomas in doubt. With P. J. tied up in the inquest, it was left up to Maggie to find out the truth, and potentially save his career. Eventually, the confession was proved false, and P. J. was cleared of any wrongdoing by the coroner.

In 1997, P. J. and Maggie were drawn into an investigation at the local gold mine when Adam and new constable Dash McKinley (Tasma Walton) found prospector Hec O'Farrell in the mine, despite him no longer holding the lease. Hec's mate, Bert, is found bashed and their jar of gold dust is missing, with P. J. believing that Hec had taken the gold himself, but Tom and Dash are skeptical. The investigation took an unexpected turn when the new miners, Matt Kinsella and Jamie Burgess, discovered a nugget of gold just when the police are on hand to play witness. A routine check into the men's backgrounds uncovers the fact that both men were guards on duty during a bullion robbery. With this information in hand, P. J. and Maggie return to the mine to investigate, only to be trapped by a cave-in caused by an explosion. Trapped in close quarters together, they finally have a chance to explore a side of their relationship which they'd been suppressing for a long time.

While waiting for rescue, the trapped couple discussed, among other things, their hopes and dreams for the future while managing to stay hydrated thanks to water dripping from the mine ceiling. Through mere chance, and a discarded Minties wrapper, Dash and Adam realised that their colleagues were trapped in the mine while searching for Kinsella and Burgess. The rescue was complicated by the fact that the blast which caused the cave-in had made the rest of the tunnel unstable, but the State Emergency Service volunteers managed to extricate them both before the roof caved-in completely. Once free of the mine, Maggie and P. J. were set on nailing the two men for the bullion robbery, and for attempted murder, only to learn that Burgess' partner had killed Kinsella, and tried to kill Burgess.

During the fifth season, P. J. found himself under investigation by Monica Draper yet again after a suspect claimed that his confession was obtained while he was in intense pain and in need of medical attention. P. J. invited Monica to listen to the tape of the interview, but when he presses play on the tape recorder, he discovered that the tape was missing. During the search for the tape, he realised that there was only one place he hadn't searched: Monica's handbag. To the shock of everyone, the tape was there, leading Monica to admit that she'd taken the tape to protect the suspect, who is her biological son. When P. J. realised that she was covering for her son, who actually took the tape, he put aside his animosity and decided to do everything in his power to help her.

For a brief period in 1998, P. J. returned to the uniformed branch after he was selected as the acting sergeant following the station's upgrade and Tom's promotion. He found himself unable to stay out of CI matters, however, and quickly decided that he was better off as a detective, and passed the acting sergeant's role over to Nick.

Later that year, P. J. became concerned that he may have contracted HIV after he cut his hand while rescuing a bloodied driver from his mangled car. No-one knew about the driver might be HIV-positive until a nurse at the local hospital contracted the virus after suffering a needlestick injury while treating the man. P. J.'s secretive behaviour and his contact with the nurse led Maggie to suspect them of an affair, until he explained the situation. When the driver was seen on security footage holding up a service station with a syringe full of blood, it appeared certain that he was HIV-positive. The police soon discovered that everything isn't always as it seems when the truth comes out, the nurse actually contracted the virus while having an affair, and it was unlikely the P. J., nor Maggie, had anything to worry about.

Throughout 1999, P. J. became worried for Maggie's safety as she doggedly pursued the drug ring which killed her brother, Robbie. His worst fears were confirmed when she went missing and one of her contacts is found dead. Reinforcements arrive from St Davids, but P. J. was overwrought and it became apparent to everyone that his relationship with Maggie was far more than professional. Taken off the case, he continued to investigate privately with help from Pat Doyle, who informed him of a crooked cop working with the syndicate. After learning that Maggie was meeting with a new dealer, they rushed to the scene to find her car in flames, with a charred body inside. Fortunately, the body wasn't Maggie, but with someone wanting her dead, it soon became clear that she would need to enter Witness Protection for her own safety.

After Maggie's return, P. J. briefly entertained the prospect of standing aside in favour of allowing her to have a relationship with Ben Stewart (Paul Bishop), but ultimately he proposed to her after an altercation with a group of Y2K survivalists. The engagement proves to be short-lived, however, when bent copper Barry Craig is killed in prison after doing a deal with Maggie. The deal included the names of everyone involved in the syndicate, including several cops, and she was now in danger. When her house is torched, it became clear that she needed to return to Witness Protection. Despite P. J.'s demands to go with her, it is organised that she will enter the program alone.

Tragedy strikes for the couple when, on her way to a meeting with her brother Mick (Terry Serio), Maggie is shot and killed, dying in P. J.'s arms when he arrives on the scene. As P. J. and his fellow officers tried to cope with their grief, the evidence had begun to pile up which fingered P. J. as the murderer and, to make things worse, his service weapon was missing from the safe. The investigation uncovered a key witness who placed P. J. at the crime scene, which gave the Homicide Squad enough evidence to charge him. The case against him quickly fell apart, however, when the witness is found dead and Ben uncovers evidence that the witness had been paid to set P. J. up.

Over the next several months, P. J. continued to inch closer to finding the identity of his fiancée's killer. The breakthrough moment came when the driver of a crashed car left the hospital before shooting a local mechanic execution style and taking something from wreck of his car. In order to flush the killer out, P. J. agreed to act as bait, but the suspect was already waiting for them, and after he narrowly missed shooting P. J., he was taken out by a head-shot from one of the detectives. Then, more than ever, P. J. was sure that a corrupt cop was behind Maggie's death and, as the final pieces of the puzzle fell into place, he uncovered an unimaginable act of betrayal. Finally, he confronted Maggie's killer in a fight to the death which ended when Pat arrived, shooting and killing his last living child.

In 2001, P. J.'s mother Helena (Arianthe Galani) arrived in town and invited him to join her at a "get rich seminar". Helena missed the seminar, which ends abruptly when an irate woman crashed her car through the building housing the seminar. As P. J. tried to investigate the woman and her feud with the seminar's host, his efforts were complicated by the fact that his mother was working to discredit the seminar host herself. Against his better judgement, he agreed to let his mother wear a wire, getting them the information they needed to arrest the con man, and later invited Helena to live with him full-time.

Helena returned the following year, this time with her new boyfriend in tow, and immediately complicated when they purchased a collectable pottery item believed to be stolen goods. P. J. took an immediate dislike to Stefan (Bob Ruggiero), which put a lot of pressure on his relationship with his mother. Finally, Stefan sacrifices his own happiness to save Helena's relationship with her son, and drives off into the sunset alone, leaving Helena to make a heart-breaking admission to her son. Over the coming weeks, P. J. tried and failed to come to terms with his mother's terminal cancer diagnosis. When she lapsed into a coma that she would never wake from, he finally found it within himself to say goodbye after a chat with Ben.

After slowly growing closer over the course of the previous twelve months, P. J. found himself forced to confront his feelings for his colleague, Jo Parrish (Jane Allsop), while investigating a crashed vehicle found at the bottom of a cliff with a body inside. Although he initially suspected suicide, P. J. was surprised to learn that his new flatmate, Marko, knew the victim, who worked for his father and their landlord, George Fiorelli. Unbeknownst to anyone, a family with a score to settle had closed in, and kidnapped Jo in the belief that she could help lead them to Fiorelli. After being rescued by P. J., Jo was put in peril once more Marko turned on her and joined his father in reclaiming some valuable paintings, only for both to be murdered in a revenge killing in front of her. Meanwhile, the realisation that he nearly lost her twice in one day was enough to get P. J. to admit his feelings for her.

The eleventh season started with P. J. investigating a break-in at the local Salvation Army hall. He immediately suspected Luke Darcy, who had recently been released from prison. Despite finding no evidence linking him to the crime, and claims from multiple people that Luke has reformed and found religion, he doggedly pursued his hunch, bringing Luke in on several other matters. It looked like P. J. had crossed the line into police harassment, only to be proven right when Luke attempted to rape Jo.

Later that night, Ben and Evan Jones (Ditch Davey) found Luke dead with an axe sticking out of his head, and P. J. standing over the body. He refused to help the investigation in any way, which left the Homicide Squad detectives with no choice but to arrest him for murder again. As Jo and her colleagues continued to investigate, they realised that P. J. was protecting someone, and there was only one person in Kayla Darcy that he'd be willing to protect. With the killer found, the Homicide Squad dropped the charges against P. J. and he returned to duty once more.

Later in the year, P. J.'s romance with Jo was in full bloom and they had agreed to get married and have children together. The engagement was short-lived, however, when their current case appears to be linked to one investigated by Maggie while she was acting sergeant. Tortured by nightmares of his first love, P. J. was forced to talk a woman out of taking her own life, admitting to her that you only get one great love, and that he had lost his. Jo overheard the conversation and broke off the engagement.

Shortly after the collapse of the engagement, Jo was killed along with Clancy Freeman (Michael Isaacs) when the police station was destroyed by a bomb. Although the whole station was grieving, there was still the matter of bringing the culprit, or culprits, to justice, so P. J. joined Nick Schultz, now a detective sergeant in the Homicide Squad, and new colleague Amy Fox (Rachel Gordon), on the investigation.

Over the course of the next few weeks, P. J. became concerned that Tom had become fixated on the Baxter family, who were prime suspects in the station bombing, and asks Tom's daughter to reason with him. The situation with Tom and the Baxters continued to deteriorate as Tom took the investigation into his own hands and headed to Melbourne to locate some information allowing Nick and P. J. to authorise a search and surveillance on the Baxter property, and the neighbouring land. This surveillance finally allowed them to catch the Baxters on drug charges, and eventually to charge them for bombing the station. After Nick returned to Melbourne, P. J. became concerned for Tom's mental health after hearing that his informant in Melbourne had been killed in an accidental explosion.

P. J.'s final case in Mount Thomas came in August 2005 when a young teenage girl was found murdered. The girl had been returned to a couple claiming to be her family mere hours earlier by Sergeant Mark Jacobs (Geoff Morrell). Along with Amy, and her former lover Garth Henderson (Andy Rodoreda), he delved into an investigation that revealed a truth far darker than any of them could imagine. During the course of the case, Garth offered Amy a spot on his new Cold Case Squad, but she declined and suggested that he offer the job to P. J. instead. Reflecting on the fates of the nameless victims of the Bidens, P. J. and Amy agreed to always fight for justice for the innocent victims of crime. As he prepares to leave Mount Thomas for new pastures in Melbourne, he shares fond farewells with Tom and Chris, but his most emotional farewell comes from Amy.

== Relationships ==
=== Romance ===
P. J. Hasham has never been married, but has been engaged twice, with both engagements ending in tragic circumstances:

- Maggie Doyle (Lisa McCune) was P. J.'s first fiancée. Although they often butted heads when their theories on cases didn't match up, Maggie was his most frequent investigative partner after her arrival at the station. Their relationship turned romantic after they were trapped together overnight in an old goldmine. After initially hiding their relationship for fear of being transferred, they finally announced their engagement in 1999. The engagement ended just two episodes later, however, as Maggie was gunned down on the brink of entering the Witness Protection Program.
- Jo Parrish (Jane Allsop) was P. J.'s second fiancée. After Maggie's death, Jo became his preferred investigative partner, and when a room became available at the house he shared with Ben Stewart, she also became his housemate. After spending the night together for the first time, they initially decided to just be good friends, but found themselves sleeping together once more after a passionate argument. P. J. proposed midway through the eleventh season, but Jo broke off the engagement a short time later after deciding that she couldn't and wouldn't compete with the ghost of Maggie Doyle. A short time later, Jo was killed when the police station was bombed.

During the first season, P. J. was shown to have a previous romantic relationship with Hillary Edmunds (Jennifer Botica), a detective in the Stock Squad. He also had a brief romantic relationship with paramedic Gina Belfanti, but they broke up when Gina realised that P. J. was in love with Maggie. In later seasons, he also had an off-and-on relationship with Ben's sister, Liz Stewart (Kat Stewart).

=== Family ===
Very little is known of P. J.'s family apart from his mother. He had a very close relationship with his mother, and struggled to cope with her death from cancer. His father was killed when he was 11 years old, and it is mentioned briefly that he has at least two older sisters, who were in Beirut as of 2002, but there is no further mention of them after this.

=== Friends and colleagues ===
Over the course of some fifteen years in Mount Thomas, P. J. is shown to have developed friendships, or at least close acquaintances, with a number of local personalities. His most significant friendship outside of the force is the one he shares with Chris Riley (Julie Nihill), a shire councillor and the publican of the Imperial Hotel, the local "watering hole" used by the local police. Although their relationship is damaged somewhat by Chris' refusal to testify in one of his cases, they repair the damage over time, and P. J. is often the person who finds Chris and sends her to see Tom when he needs comfort or a friend. When he leaves Mount Thomas to move to Melbourne, Chris is the one person, apart from his colleagues, that he seeks out and says goodbye to.

Despite pointing out on more than one occasion that he didn't actually answer to the station sergeant, P. J. formed a strong bond with Tom Croydon (John Wood) over their time working together, built on their mutual respect for one another. Although he frequently begged off from taking part in anything he felt was "a job for the uniforms", he was known on occasion to complete tasks unrelated to criminal investigations, including at least one occasion where he helped the Traffic Branch with random breath testing. P. J. wasn't always particularly close to his colleagues, but he was always willing to get together at the end of the day with a couple of beers at the Imperial Hotel.

Other than Tom, his closest friend on the force was probably Nick Schultz (William McInnes), with whom he often teamed up to tease the junior constables at the station, and with whom he shared a house for some time. After a rough start due to their shared attraction to Maggie Doyle, he also formed a close bond with Ben Stewart (Paul Bishop), who was also his house-mate for a time. When Jo broke off her engagement with P. J., it was Ben who tried to repair the damage, knowing how much they meant to each other.

After the station bombing, P. J. is joined in Mount Thomas by a second detective, Amy Fox (Rachel Gordon), and her abrupt arrival coming immediately after the end of his engagement and Jo's death, leads to friction between them. Over time, he grows closer to Amy, and she ultimately gives up a prestigious place on the Cold Case Squad for him. As he leaves Mount Thomas, they share an emotional goodbye and vow to always work for justice and the innocent.

Bad experiences in his early career as a detective caused him to develop a distrust of the Ethical Standards Division (ESD), particularly of Monica Draper (Peta Doodson), whose testimony had seen him transferred to Mount Thomas from his cushy job on the Regional Gaming Squad. Despite his dislike of the "toe-cutters", he wasn't completely opposed to taking down corrupt cops, taking part in an operation which exposed his then boss, Detective Senior Sergeant Peter Grantham (David Glazebrook), as a crook, and later working to expose the police insider within a drug organisation who had killed his fiancée.

== Personality ==
The character of P. J. Hasham was conceived as a cowboy detective, and was initially portrayed as a womaniser, with his first appearance in the show seeing him observe Maggie Doyle's car approaching and telling Nick Schultz he was taking the next one while conducting random breath testing on the highway. In answer, Schultz warned him to "make sure she isn't married this time". In addition, he struggled to express his feelings, particularly towards the opposite sex, and only admitted to loving Maggie, and later Jo, after one or both of them had been put through a life-threatening ordeal.

P. J. has no patience for modern technology, when he receives a new mobile phone, he tells Jo that he's going to shove it in a drawer somewhere. In spite of this, he frequently states that he is smarter than the "uniforms", and will often talk down to them if they make a suggestion he either doesn't want, or doesn't agree with. He is loyal to his colleagues, and the station as a whole, however, and will back them to the hilt if he believes they are right, even if that means going against his superiors.

Since the death of his father, he has become a skeptic, particularly when it comes to matters of faith, and prefers to deal in facts, being doubtful of anything that he can't find a logical explanation for. This contributes to his struggles to deal with grief, which sees him go to extreme lengths to either prevent the deaths of those close to him or, in the case of his two fiancées, ensuring that their killers are brought to justice. He believes that people can be truly, irredeemably evil, and will do anything in his power to prevent such people from harming innocent people even after their death, going so far as to take the wrap on a murder charge in order to protect a young mother who killed a man in self-defence.

== Reception ==
Although Blue Heelers was not expected to become a popular programme, the show became a hit shortly after it began airing, with much of this success credited to the quality of the ensemble cast, including Martin Sacks as P. J. Hasham.

During his time on Blue Heelers, Sacks was nominated for the Silver Logie Award for Most Popular Actor each year from 1997 until 2001, winning the award on all five occasions. He was also nominated twice at the People's Choice Awards, being nominated for Favourite Actor in a Drama or Serial in both 1998 and 1999, winning the award in 1998.

As a result of his time on the show, Sacks became one of the most recognisable faces in Australian television, with as many as 4 million viewers watching his will-they-won't-they romance with Lisa McCune's Maggie Doyle on a weekly basis. The relationship culminated in Maggie's death in what remains one of the most iconic moments in Australian television history.
