= Blue Heelers season 5 =

Blue Heelers
- Season 5
- Blue Heelers cast of 1998
- No. of episodes: 41

Release
- Original network: Seven Network
- Original release: 24 February – 25 November 1998

Season chronology
- ← Previous; Season 4 Next → Season 6

The fifth season of the Australian police-drama Blue Heelers premiered on the Seven Network on 24 February 1998 and aired on Wednesday nights at 8:30 PM. The 41-episode season concluded 25 November 1998. The 41-episode fifth season saw the show move to Wednesday nights at 8:30 PM, making way for All Saints on Tuesdays at 8.30 PM.

== Casting ==
Damian Walshe-Howling appeared in the full season as Adam Cooper but finished his almost five-year career on the show with the show's season five finale - "Rotten Apple (Part 2)".

Paul Bishop began his playing his part of Ben Stewart before he actually became a permanent cast member in the episode "Nine Lives". William McInnes left the series because of lack of his storyline in the show and moving on to further projects.

=== Main ===
- John Wood as Sergeant/Senior Sergeant Tom Croydon
- Julie Nihill as Chris Riley
- Martin Sacks as Senior Detective/Acting Sergeant P. J. Hasham
- Lisa McCune as Constable/Senior Constable/Acting Sergeant Maggie Doyle
- William McInnes as Senior Constable/Sergeant Nick Schultz up to episode 37
- Damian Walshe-Howling as Constable Adam Cooper
- Tasma Walton as Constable Dash McKinley
- Paul Bishop as Detective Acting Sergeant/Senior Constable Ben Stewart from episode 20

=== Recurring ===
- Peta Doodson as Inspector Monica Draper
- Beth Buchanan as Susan Croydon
- Michael Isaacs as Clancy Freeman
- Suzi Dougherty as Dr. Mel Carter
- Axl Taylor as Len the barman
- Dennis Miller as Ex-Sergeant Pat Doyle
- Stuart Baker as "Richo"
- Reg Evans as Keith Purvis
- Terry Gill as Chief Superintendent Clive Adamson
- Karen Davitt as Dr. Zoe Hamilton
- Don Bridges as Charlie Clarke
- Marie Trevor as Lelia Clegg
- Pauline Terry-Bietz as Beth McKinley
- Neil Pigot as Inspector Russell Falcon-Price
- Adam May as Ellis Corby
- Peter Aanensen as Merv Poole
- Jeremy Kewley as Tony Timms
- Kevin Harrington as Charlie McKinley
- Catherine Wilkin as Sally Downie
- Grant Piro as Tim Ryan

=== Guests ===
- Shane Connor
- James Condon
- John Clayton
- Maggie Dence
- Peter O'Brien
- Shaun Micallef
- Ross Williams
- Grant Piro
- Val Lehman
- Monica Maughan
- Anne Phelan
- Dennis Coard
- Carol Burns
- Sean Scully

== Episodes ==
| No. overall | No. in season | Title | Directed by | Written by | Australian air date |
|---|---|---|---|---|---|
| 171 | 1 | "Secrets (1)" | Richard Jasek | Jenny Lewis | 24 February 1998 |
It seems that everyone has forgotten Dash's birthday. And she finds herself in the middle of a school hostage situation
| 172 | 2 | "Secrets (2)" | Russell Burton | David Marsh | 25 February 1998 |
Dash tries to outwit the gunman who has taken her hostage while the other Heelers search for her.
| 173 | 3 | "Smoke and Mirrors" | Karl Steinberg | Cassandra Carter | 4 March 1998 |
Adam discovers everyone is not always as they seem when he gets a startling surprise when he discovers a big secret about one of his friends. Will he let this secret impact on their friendship and will they be able to get through all right?
| 174 | 4 | "Moving House" | Fiona Banks | David Allen | 11 March 1998 |
A local resident Bob Barker reports that his house has been stolen and Tom's friend Sally Downie is involved. Tom is in a dilemma: Should he risk his bias or try to continue to prove her innocence or leave it to Maggie and PJ?
| 175 | 5 | "Piece of Cake" | Steve Mann | Bill Garner | 18 March 1998 |
The station is thrown into chaos when a review team arrives in Mount Thomas
| 176 | 6 | "Keeping Mum" | Russell Burton | Peter Dick & David Allen | 25 March 1998 |
When P.J. suspects Monica Draper of covering up a crime, a shocking secret is revealed when her past re-surfaces and P.J has to make a big decision, will he take revenge on Monica Draper for the years that she treated him unfairly or, will he let go of these feelings and support Monica in her time of need.
| 177 | 7 | "Letting Go" | Richard Jasek | Paul Davies | 1 April 1998 |
Nick is forced to face up to a long-standing grievance with his family when his parents visit and P.J becomes Sergeant after Tom is promoted to Senior Sergeant
| 178 | 8 | "The Whistle Blower" | Simon Phillips | Susan Hore | 8 April 1998 |
P.J's CI replacement Deborah Hill arrives in Mount Thomas and starts to make waves with the Heelers and accusations go flying everywhere when distrust creates tension when she accuses Nick of pushing her down the stairs of a stakeout
| 179 | 9 | "King of Hearts" | Steve Mann | Ysabelle Dean | 15 April 1998 |
Nick's plans to marry Zoe are tested when they are both accused of murder. Martin Bridport, a Cardiologist from Melbourne turns up, claiming to be Zoe's boyfriend. Zoe becomes angry when he kills her horse, and won't leave when told to, claiming that they are still together. Attempting to smooth things over, Nick takes Zoe to the Imperial where Martin Bridport again turns up and Nick loses his cool with him. The next day Nick is woken and told that Martin Bridport is dead. Nick refuses to cooperate with the Homicide squad or even the other Heelers
| 180 | 10 | "When Love's Not Enough" | Richard Jasek | Judy Colquhoun | 22 April 1998 |
When Dash uncovers a case of neglect, it places Tom in the difficult position of deciding if he will betray a friend's trust while trying to defuse the situation at the same time is forced to make a choice about Clancy and Leonie who are positive that their daughter Rachel will be taken from them and they run away in desperation in the middle of a meningitis outbreak
| 181 | 11 | "Stars in Their Eyes" | Kevin Carlin | Matthew Williams | 29 April 1998 |
Dash finds herself babysitting two dodgy film producers when movie fever hits Mount Thomas
| 182 | 12 | "She Killed Santa" | Richard Burton | Dave Marsh | 6 May 1998 |
Maggie takes on the responsibility of an Assistant Crown Prosecutor in a criminal trial. Tom finds himself on the side of the accused, a woman charged with the murder of her husband.
| 183 | 13 | "This Mortal Coil" | Justin McSwiney | Cassandra Carter | 13 May 1998 |
The Heelers' fears are realized, when a woman suffering from Motor Neurone Disease is found dead. Her family's pleas for her to be euthanised make Zoe sure that it was not the disease that ended her suffering.
| 184 | 14 | "Waste of Space" | Chris Langman | Jenny Lewis | 20 May 1998 |
Strange things are happening in the Eventide Retirement Home. Valuables are going missing. A person is found dead in mysterious circumstances and another puts others lives in danger when he hallucinates after smoking marijuana.
| 185 | 15 | "A Bit of Biff" | Ray Quint | Bill Garner | 27 May 1998 |
A visiting troupe of boxers cause headaches for the Heelers with a series of brawling and pick pocketing incidents. Adam boxes for charity to Tom's disapproval.
| 186 | 16 | "Mr. Lucky" | Fiona Banks | John Banas | 3 June 1998 |
"Mr. Lucky" is Enzo Fiorelli, a charming, charismatic and successful con man. Released after a long stretch in prison, he blows his witness protection cover and returns to Mount Thomas where he receives hate mail, a brick through the windscreen of his expensive car and finally a bullet through one of his tyres.
| 187 | 17 | "Deception" | Russell Burton | Michael Winter | 10 June 1998 |
Sally Downie, the woman in Tom's life has been abducted and the Heelers suspect the same two violent criminals who are holding hostage the daughter of a con man.
| 188 | 18 | "Catch of the Day" | Pino Amenta | David Anthony | 17 June 1998 |
Adam and Dash find intrepid reporter for the Mount Thomas Gazette, Tony Timms, dazed and injured on the riverbank while they are investigating a reported explosion. After eating fish at a charity dinner, the Heelers come down with food poisoning.
| 189 | 19 | "Deed not the Breed" | Richard Sarell | Ysabelle Dean | 24 June 1998 |
Dash is befriended by a stray dog, but when she brings it back to the station it attacks Nick and causes havoc. When she defies Tom by not taking it to the pound, she becomes almost obsessively defensive of the animal. Tom is seriously annoyed with her for her insubordination, but the wind is taken out of his sails when he learns that she has cancer.
| 190 | 20 | "Victims" | Richard Sarell | David Boutland | 1 July 1998 |
Tom is faced with a dilemma when a mother asks him to protect her son, a convicted felon who is back home after early release. The news brings Detective Ben Stewart from Organized Crime to Mount Thomas who takes a shine to Maggie to P.J.'s disapproval. And Ben and P.J walk into a siege situation. First appearance of Senior Constable Ben Stewart
| 191 | 21 | "The Living Dead" | Richard Jasek | Michaeley O'Brien | 8 July 1998 |
Maggie and PJ discover a road accident victim has been shot with a bullet from a missing police gun. Visiting detective Peppy Romano is convinced the death is a life insurance fraud, but events soon take a mysterious turn
| 192 | 22 | "Spinning the Yarn" | Fiona Banks | Mary McCormick | 15 July 1998 |
Maggie and P.J. uncover a bitter family feud that threatens to destroy the love of two young musicians.
| 193 | 23 | "The Dark Side" | Russell Burton | David Allen | 22 July 1998 |
Maggie and P.J. find their relationship under pressure when a visiting detective, Ben Stewart is accused of murder.
| 194 | 24 | "Intervention" | Fiona Banks | Cass Carter | 29 July 1998 |
Nick questions his ability to continue in the Police Force when he puts a woman's life at risk.
| 195 | 25 | "Murder in Mind" | Richard Jasek | John Banas | 5 August 1998 |
Tom clashes with Chris when she fights passionately to save a friend who is accused of an unsolved 50-year-old murder.
| 196 | 26 | "Blood Ties" | Steve Mann | David Marsh | 12 August 1998 |
While P.J. waits for the result of a blood test, Maggie helps him search for a young man who holds the key to saving both their lives.
| 197 | 27 | "Little Monsters" | Chris Langman | Bill Garner | 19 August 1998 |
Mount Thomas is in the grip of fear as a serial killer stalks the area. Adam becomes a hero by apprending a suspect on his own. Later, after a series of fires at the local school, Dash is appalled to learn that one of four suspects that are budding serial killers, is her niece Fiona.
| 198 | 28 | "Nine Lives" | Grant Brown | Tony Morphett | 26 August 1998 |
Ben returns to a permanent posting in Mount Thomas and quickly tests all the other Heelers' loyalties.
| 199 | 29 | "Missing Digits" | Richard Jasek | Grace Morris & Caroline Stanton | 2 September 1998 |
P.J. and Ben compete to win Maggie over by solving the mystery behind a lawyer's death.
| 200 | 30 | "Child's Play" | Steve Mann | Michael Winter & David Allen | 9 September 1998 |
Dash learns that a woman's reason for suiciding may have been caused by her infertility due chemotherapy.
| 201 | 31 | "False Alarms" | Karl Steinberg | Geraldine Pilkington | 16 September 1998 |
When Adam finds himself in serious trouble with Tom, he is tempted to take an offer that could end his career.
| 202 | 32 | "Nobody's Perfect" | Grant Brown | Caroline Stanton & Mary McCormick | 23 September 1998 |
Ben fights for the life of a troubled teenager while Adam is tempted by a bribe.
| 203 | 33 | "Turkish Delight" | Richard Jasek | Cassandra Carter | 30 September 1998 |
Nick fears for the life of a young Turkish woman who disappears after her parents announcement of her arranged marriage.
| 204 | 34 | "Like Father Like Son" | Raymond Quint | Bill Garner | 7 October 1998 |
Ben's investigation of some farm thefts gets him involved in a bitter family feud.
| 205 | 35 | "Birds of Prey" | Chris Langman | David Marsh | 14 October 1998 |
Maggie and P.J. come to the aid of Chris when a con artist threatens to destroy the Imperial.
| 206 | 36 | "Mates Rates" | Richard Sarell | Beverly Evans | 21 October 1998 |
Adam foolishly buys a sporty, second-hand car. Little to his knowledge at this point does he know that his beloved new car is actually a rebirth and is, in other words, stolen.
| 207 | 37 | "Wedding Blues" | Karl Steinberg | David Boutland | 28 October 1998 |
A parking inspector goes missing; a wedding celebrant seems to be up to something fishing; and, Nick and Zoe are married. Following their small, and somewhat nail-biting, wedding, they both leave Mount Thomas to go to the city to start their new lives together. Final appearance of Sergeant Nicholas Schultz
| 208 | 38 | "All in the Family" | Raymond Quint | Ysabelle Dean | 4 November 1998 |
Ben clashes with Tom when he finds himself championing the cause of Maureen Ritchie and her 3 foster children.
| 209 | 39 | "Hunted" | Chris Langman | Jenny Lewis | 11 November 1998 |
Maggie's brother Robbie, after escaping from custody, finds Maggie and assaults her at her home. After this, the Heelers believe it would be best for Maggie to look after the Widgeree Police Station while the popular boating festival is on. Upon arriving at Widgeree, Maggie finds a woman that has been bashed, she goes inside to find help but instead finds a man holding a young boy hostage. Maggie, having her gun stolen, escapes with the boy and they're chased by the man. They both escape into the bush, with the help of Robbie, while the Heelers back at Mount Thomas are becoming worried about where Maggie could be.
| 210 | 40 | "Rotten Apple (1)" | Fiona Banks | Mary McCormick | 18 November 1998 |
While Dash awaits her final cancer results, she becomes drawn into a case involving one of her old and trusted schoolteachers. Dash and Adam worry about their jobs and the upcoming doctor's appointment and they find comfort in each other's arms.
| 211 | 41 | "Rotten Apple (2)" | Richard Sarell | Rachel Lewis | 25 November 1998 |
Tom discovers the truth about Adam's new car and dismisses him from the police force immediately while Adam leaves Mount Thomas, not before taking his revenge on Tom by giving him a shiny black eye. Final appearance of Constable Adam Cooper

== DVD release ==
The Complete Fifth Season: Part 1
| Set Details | Special Features |
| 24 Episodes (1080 Mins.); Episodes 140–163; 6-Disc Set; Full Frame; English (Dolby Digital 2.0 Stereo) | Slipcase Packaging; Photo Gallery |
| Release Dates | Slipcase Packaging; Photo Gallery |
| Australia | Slipcase Packaging; Photo Gallery |
| 8 June 2006 | Slipcase Packaging; Photo Gallery |

The Complete Fifth Season: Part 2
| Set Details | Special Features |
| 18 Episodes (810 Mins.); Episodes 164–181; 5-Disc Set; Full Frame; English (Dolby Digital 2.0 Stereo) | Slipcase Packaging; Photo Gallery (10 Pics) |
| Release Dates | Slipcase Packaging; Photo Gallery (10 Pics) |
| Australia | Slipcase Packaging; Photo Gallery (10 Pics) |
| 8 June 2006 | Slipcase Packaging; Photo Gallery (10 Pics) |

The Complete Fifth Season
| Set Details | Special Features |
| 42 Episodes (1890 Mins.); Episodes 140–181; 11-Disc Set; Full Frame; English (Dolby Digital 2.0 Stereo) | Slipcase Packaging; Photo Gallery |
| Release Dates | Slipcase Packaging; Photo Gallery |
| Australia | Slipcase Packaging; Photo Gallery |
| 8 June 2006 | Slipcase Packaging; Photo Gallery |
