= Tom Croydon =

- Blue Heelers character
- John Wood as Tom Croydon
- First appearance: "A Woman's Place" (Ep. #1); 18 January 1994
- Last appearance: "One Day More" (Ep. #510); 4 June 2006
- Created by: Hal McElroy and Tony Morphett
- Portrayed by: John Wood

In-universe information
- Full name: Thomas Arthur Croydon
- Occupation: Police officer
- Spouses: Nell Croydon; Grace Curtis
- Children: Anna Croydon; Susan Croydon
- Religion: Roman Catholic

Career with Victoria Police
- Position: Mt. Thomas Police Station: Station Supervisor; Station Sergeant (before 1998)
- Rank: Senior Sergeant
- Years of service: c. 1971–present

Thomas Arthur "Tom" Croydon is a fictional character in the long-running Australian police drama Blue Heelers, portrayed by John Wood. A long-serving member of the police force, Tom has decades of experience of being a police officer in a small country town, and an attitude which earns him the respect, trust and even affection of his subordinates. As the most senior officer in the country town of Mount Thomas, he frequently acts as a mentor and father figure to the junior members of the station, but eventually a series of personal tragedies put him into a downward spiral which threatens both his personal and professional lives. He is one of two characters, along with Chris Riley, to appear in all thirteen seasons of the show, and is the only character to appear in all 510 episodes to air.

== Development and casting ==
The character of Tom Croydon was created by Hal McElroy and Tony Morphett to be the senior officer at the Mount Thomas Police Station. His early characterisation is that of a tough, chauvinistic police officer who has lived most of life in the same country town and sees policing in the bush very differently from the way it is handled in the city.

John Wood was drawn to the role by quality of the scripts he had been given, including an audition script where two young constables entered the sergeant's office and inform him that they'd just shot someone's dog. Wood, who was three years removed from starring in legal drama Rafferty's Rules, cited the scripts as the best he had read since leaving Rafferty's.

In later years, a change in direction of the show resulted in Mount Thomas becoming a darker, grittier place. A number of personal tragedies, including the loss of a colleague and the murder of his second wife cause the character's whole outlook to change from affable country peace-maker into a revenge-driven lone wolf.

== Character background ==
In his fictional backstory, the character is the son of a Roman Catholic dairy farmer, and was raised on his family's property located outside Mount Thomas, a short distance from an Aboriginal mission at Lake End where he attended the small one-teacher school. Although his exact age and date of birth are unknown, he was in infants' school in 1955 and is stated to have served on national service during the Vietnam War, serving with 5th Battalion, Royal Australian Regiment – placing his date of birth no later than 1950–51. His oldest friend in town is the publican of the Imperial Hotel, Chris Riley (Julie Nihill), who he was at school with.

A pillar of the local community, Tom is shown to be a passionate supporter, and former player and coach, of the local football club, the "Mudlarks", and serves for a time as the president of the local racing club.

== Role on Blue Heelers ==
Tom joined the Victoria Police sometime around 1971 and was assigned to the police station in his hometown of Mount Thomas where he served as a probationary constable under Sergeant Rice. Sometime in 1973, he joined Sergeant Rice in assisting the Welfare Department with the removal of three Aboriginal children living at Lake End Mission from a violent domestic situation. Later, in September 1980, he arrested Clive Ostroff, a local handyman, for the murder of a local girl and physically assaulted him during the arrest. At some point prior to the first season, Tom was posted to the same station as Pat Doyle, the father of one of his future subordinates, and the pair's acrimonious relationship would persist for decades.

By 1994, Tom had risen to the rank of sergeant and was in charge of the station at Mount Thomas, as well as a small one-man station in the nearby town of Widgeree. He oversaw a team made up of traffic officer Nick Schultz (William McInnes), detective P. J. Hasham (Martin Sacks) and wet-behind-the-ears youngsters Maggie Doyle (Lisa McCune) and Wayne Patterson (Grant Bowler), later joined by a third young officer in Adam Cooper (Damian Walshe-Howling).

Near the end of the first season, Tom was left a widower after his wife Nell was killed in a head-on accident which also seriously injured their younger daughter, Susan (Beth Buchanan), and killed the three occupants of the other car. At first, Tom is positive that the driver of the other car was at fault, but was distraught to learn that his wife had suffered a heart attack and veered into oncoming traffic.

During the second season, Tom was one of four officers targeted by an IID raid regarding allegations of police involvement in the sale and distribution of drugs. During the raid, the investigators found a traffickable quantity of drugs hidden in the bathroom, and a bong in Susan's bedroom, both of which she eventually admitted to owning. These discoveries saw him interviewed by the "toe-cutters", which kept him at the station even while his officers were out searching for dangerous prison escapees. Meanwhile, one of the accomplices in the prison escape had made his way to the Imperial and panicked when Adam arrived to speak to Chris. The man, Dean Shipley, took Adam and Chris hostage with a sawn-off shotgun and demanded to see Tom. Against Inspector Ted Faulkner's wishes, he entered the pub to negotiate with Dean, unarmed and without a bullet-proof vest.

While he was negotiating, Dean was spooked by something happening outside the hotel, and shot Tom in the chest with Adam's service revolver. Although the bullet missed his vital organs, he lost a lot of blood and was rushed into surgery to remove the bullet lodged against his collarbone. As the investigation progressed, evidence came to light that Dean Shipley had planted the drugs in Tom's bathroom and all charges against Susan were dropped.

In 1996, Tom's eldest daughter, Anna (Alexandra Sangster), returned to Mount Thomas after five years without contact, to let her parents know that she is pregnant, only to learn of her mother's death two years previous. Over the course of the next few episodes, he finally came to grips with the fact that he was a grandfather, only to find himself taking care of young Sam when Anna disappeared again, leaving her son behind.

When the news arrived in early 1998 that a review team was coming up from Melbourne to assess the station for potential closure, Tom is certain that the station will remain open, even as the rest of the staff tried to make the station look busier than it really is to ensure it does so. At the end of the review, the team ultimately determined that, not only should the station remain open, but that it should receive an upgrade. As a result of the upgrade, Tom was promoted to senior sergeant as the station supervisor.

In 1999, Tom became a minor celebrity when, following a police chase which resulted in an apparently fatal crash, he prayed for God to absolve the driver, Tim Sullivan, of his sins, only for Tim to sit upright in the ambulance. The incident causes a media circus to descend on the accident scene and the police station, and leaves Tom and fellow Catholic Maggie questioning their faith.

A short time later, the station was rocked by the murder of their beloved colleague, Maggie Doyle, who was gunned down while on the brink of entering the witness protection program. While he grieved, he was forced to deal with accusations that a member of his team might be the perpetrator, and with P. J.'s unfailing determination to find Maggie's killer.

In late 2001, Tom found himself struggling to reconcile his attraction to a new woman, the local Anglican priest, Grace Curtis (Debra Lawrance), with his lingering love and affection for his late wife. His life is further complicated when his friendship with the suspects in a theft case, both of whom are former colleagues, was suspected of interfering with his objectivity.

During a gathering celebrating Tom's thirty years of service in the police force, he was assaulted by an Indigenous woman who accused him of kidnapping her nearly thirty years previously from Lake End Mission, forcing him to relive one moment of his career that he'd rather forget. Desperate to atone for the sins of the past, he subsequently bends the rules to ensure that the woman gets the help she needs, and ensure that her son wouldn't get lost in the system. Later that same year, his impending marriage to Grace was put at risk when her ex-husband arrived in town and Tom is suspected of playing a part in his subsequent death.

In 2004, Tom narrowly escaped death when the police station is bombed with Jo Parrish (Jane Allsop) and Clancy Freeman (Michael Isaacs) still inside. When he later found Grace raped and murdered, this pushed him over the edge, causing him to seek vengeance against Barry Baxter (Danny Adcock), the man he suspected of committing both crimes. As he continued his single-minded campaign against the Baxters, his colleagues began to worry about the change in his personality, especially when he apparently tried to drown Barry's daughter, Tarni (Melissa Andersen).

The feud with Baxter came to a head in the middle of the following season when Tom's daughter Anna Allcott (now played by Kate Mulvany) returned to Mount Thomas and her children, Sam and Daisy, were kidnapped and buried alive by Barry. Baxter then took Joss Peroni (Danny Raco), one of Mount Thomas' junior constables, hostage in the Imperial Hotel in order to provoke a confrontation. After a tense stand-off, P. J. and Amy Fox (Rachel Gordon) rescued the children, and Baxter committed suicide with Peroni's service weapon. Once the children were returned safely to their mother, Anna angrily rebuffed her father and forbade him from contacting them.

By 2006, Tom's health had deteriorated and he was trying various medications in order to cope with the immense pain. After finally opening up to Amy, who he had come to see like a daughter, he agreed to see a doctor, who diagnoses him with prostate cancer. As he continued to struggle with his health, Tom was also forced to deal with attempts from his direct superior, District Inspector Russell Falcon-Price (Neil Pigot), to have him removed from the force and Mount Thomas Police Station closed. When Adam Cooper returned to Mount Thomas and accused his former boss of corruption, Falcon-Price is all too prepared to listen. Tom, meanwhile, had bonded with a fellow cancer sufferer, and seemed content to spend time with her, leaving the rest of his team splitting time between working to clear his name, and scouting out their potential future postings.

When Cooper's accusations fell apart, Falcon-Price was forced to drop the charges and allow the station to remain open. Finally, with his reputation intact, and after much coaxing from Amy and Kelly O'Rourke (Samantha Tolj), Tom finally accepts an invitation to a family reunion which his youngest daughter had been trying to invite him to. There, he finally reconciled with his two daughters.

=== Rank ===
Tom joined the Victoria Police sometime around 1971. At the beginning of the series in 1994, he held the rank of Sergeant.

Sergeant	"A Woman's Place" (Ep. #1) — "Piece of Cake" (Season 5)
Senior; Sergeant	"Piece of Cake" (Season 5) — "One Day More" (Ep. #510)

=== Awards and decorations ===

Vietnam Medal	
National Medal	with clasp for 25–34 years service
Australian Defence Medal	
Vietnam Campaign Medal	
Victoria Police Service Medal	with clasp for 15–19 years eligible service

Although not depicted in the show, Tom would also have been eligible for the Australian Defence Medal upon its inception in March 2006.

== Relationships ==
=== Romance ===
Tom Croydon has been married, and widowed, twice:

- Nell Croydon (Leigh Morgan) was Tom's first wife. The Croydons were childhood sweethearts, and he would ride his bike from Mount Thomas to the nearby city of St Davids to visit with her. Sometime after leaving school, they were married and have two daughters, Anna and Susan. Although she is mentioned in most episodes prior to her death in 1994, she is not seen on screen until a flashback during an episode in 1999. She is frequently mentioned as an ideal "copper's wife", having acted as the station cleaner and looked after the inmates while her husband was watch-house keeper. A member of the Country Women's Association, she was also mentioned to have been a keen gardener and an excellent baker. Nell later dies in a car accident at first Tom thinks it is the driver in the other car's fault but he later finds out the she suffered from a heart attack and swerved into incoming traffic.
- Grace Curtis (Debra Lawrance) was Tom's second wife, whom he first met while they were both walking their dogs. The rector of the local Anglican Church, she was often called on to act as a moral or religious advisor to the local police. After their marriage in 2002, Tom becomes step-father to Grace's sons, Daniel and Nelson, but his relationship with them is frequently strained, and both boys departed from Mount Thomas after Daniel was accused of gang-raping a local girl.

During the fifth and sixth seasons, Tom also has a romantic relationship with Sally Downie (Catherine Wilkin), a local lawyer. The couple frequently find themselves on opposite sides of the law and they ultimately separate after Sally takes on the defence of a drink-driver responsible for the death of one of Tom's friends.

=== Family ===
Very little is known of Tom's family apart from his wives and children. His sister, Patsy (Valentina Levkowicz) appears in two episodes during the third season, called in by Anna to help with looking after Sam. They appear to have an acrimonious relationship, with the two trading verbal barbs.

Tom is shown to be a caring father to both of his daughters, but he frequently shows a tendency to nag and the risks that his job can place those close to him under causes him to become estranged from both Anna and Susan on more than one occasion. Ultimately, though, he reconciles with his daughters and attends a family reunion with them in the final episode.

=== Friends and colleagues ===
Tom is depicted as a long-time resident of Mount Thomas, and so he is shown to be friends with a number of local personalities. His most significant friendship is the one he shares with Chris Riley (Julie Nihill), a shire councillor and the publican of the Imperial Hotel, the local "watering hole" used by the local police. Friends since they were children, Chris is often the person that Tom turns to when he needs a friend to lean on, especially after Nell's death in season 1. In subsequent seasons, there were hints of a potential mutual attraction between them, but this was never expanded upon.

Tom was also especially close to Clancy Freeman (Michael Isaacs), a mentally disabled local man who idolises the police, and in particular "Senior Tom". When his mother died from cancer, Tom arranged for Clancy's home to be turned into a group home so that he would not be alone, and would have access to a live-in carer. When Clancy and his girlfriend had a child and it became clear they were incapable of offering proper care, Tom organised a foster mother who was willing to let the parents visit regularly.

Throughout the course of the show, Tom mentors a procession of junior constables who join the Mount Thomas Police, frequently lecturing them on his philosophy for country policing. Over time, he is shown to develop an almost father-daughter dynamic with Maggie Doyle (Lisa McCune), and later with Amy Fox (Rachel Gordon). He also has a strong bond with P. J. Hasham built on their mutual respect for each other. His relationship with Kelly O'Rourke (Samantha Tolj) is somewhat different, having acted as a surrogate father for her since her father was killed in the line of duty.

His relationships with his colleagues haven't all been rosy, however, with Tom's testimony having ended the careers of more than one officer through the years. Although he managed to cultivate a working relationship with St Davids' District Inspector Ted Faulkner (Nick Waters) and later Monica Draper (Peta Doodson) of the Ethical Standards Division (ESD), he was frequently at loggerheads with their successor, Russell Falcon-Price (Neil Pigot), a fast-track officer who saw Tom as a relic of the past.

== Personality ==
A career police officer, Tom Croydon is initially portrayed as somewhat of a chauvinist, referring to Maggie Doyle as "girlie" when they first meet. He is firm, loyal to the officers under his command and committed to justice. He takes an old-fashioned approach to policing, firmly believing that being a cop in a country town involves more than just charging people for every minor infraction. Although he's been known to let a troublesome kid spend a few hours in the cells, or to pay penance by washing the police vehicles, he's equally willing to come down hard on anyone who needs it.

Tom is generally laid-back and doesn't stand on ceremony – he prefers being called "boss" to "sergeant" – but that doesn't stop him from being exacting in the standards he expects from his people. He's not afraid to let his staff know exactly what he thinks when they've done something he doesn't agree with, but he trusts them to get results and will back them to the hilt.

Things change after the station is bombed in season 11, causing Tom to go off the rails. Now consumed by his desire for revenge, he becomes vitriolic, angry and downright brutal. Where once he was one of the best-loved men in town, he becomes the kind of person who nearly drowns a girl, and who gate-crashes a funeral to taunt a suspect. These changes cause him to abandon friends and come very close to wrecking his career. His cancer diagnosis in the final season sees him begin to open up, and glimpses of the old Tom Croydon appear again as he befriends a fellow cancer sufferer and tries to help her during her final days.

== Reception ==
Although Blue Heelers was not expected to become a popular programme, the show became a hit shortly after it began airing, with much of this success credited to the quality of the ensemble cast, led by John Wood as Tom Croydon.

During his time on Blue Heelers, Wood was nominated for the Gold Logie, the award for the most popular personality on Australian television, each year from 1997 until 2007. After nine consecutive nominations without a victory, Wood was finally awarded the prize in 2006 before being nominated for an eleventh consecutive year in 2007. On the first three occasions, he was beaten to the prize by his co-star Lisa McCune. During that time-frame, he was also nominated for the Silver Logie Award for Most Popular Actor on ten occasions, winning the award twice in 2005 and 2006.
