= The Truckies =

- Genre: Drama
- Country of origin: Australia
- No. of seasons: 1
- No. of episodes: 12

Production
- Executive producer: Oscar Whitbread
- Producer: John Gauci
- Running time: 60 minutes

Original release
- Network: ABC
- Release: 31 July – 16 October 1978

The Truckies is an Australian television drama which first screened on the ABC in 1978.

== Premise ==
The Truckies was about the pressures of life on the road for transport driver Chris and his wife Carol.

== Cast ==
- Michael Aitkens as Chris
- John Wood as Stokey, Chris' friend
- Colleen Hewett as Carol, Chris' wife
- Michael Carman as Jeff
- Frank Wilson as Wally
- John Ewart as Spanner
- Lois Ramsey as Dora
- Tom Oliver and Tommy Dysart as the Devlin brothers
- Denise Drysdale
- Sigrid Thornton
- Jonathan Hardy

== Production ==
It was executive produced by Oscar Whitbread and was made by several of the team behind the TV show Power Without Glory.

== Episodes ==
1. Running In (31 July 1978) - w Keith Thompson dir John Gauci. Chris and Stokey deal with the Devlin brothers.
2. Prime Movers (7 Aug 1978) - w Keith Thompson d Douglas Sharp.
3. Short Haul (14 Aug 1978)
4. Rear Vision (21 Aug 1978)
5. Country Music (28 Aug 1978) - w Michael Aitkens d John Gauci.
6. Road Games (4 Sept 1978) - w Everett de Roche, d Michael Ludbrook.
7. Hitching Up (11 Sept 1978)
8. Heat Wave (18 Sept 1978)
9. Brumby Run (25 Sept 1978)
10. Road to Naragoona (2 Oct 1978) - Chris and Stokey both find romance when they break down in a small town.
11. Thunderplain Stallion (9 Oct 1978) - Chris and Stokey escort a racehorse.
12. Final Payment (16 October 1978) - Chris finds out Carol is pregnant.

== Reception ==
Reviewing the first episode the Sun Herald said "the ABC has gone down market... the people at whom this series is aimed would rarely turn to the ABC."

== Critique ==
John Wood later recalled: "I thought it was a tremendously innovative show, but it came aground on the reef of ABC internal politics. Obviously there were things wrong with it, and I guess by going for truthfulness they stuffed up in a sense, because one of the problems in driving along in a truck and doing different angles and two shots and reverses is that it's totally impossible to match the engine revs at any time. But apart from that problem of not being able to match the soundtrack, I thought it was a wonderful show. Unfortunately it caused a lot of havoc, because the guy who took over as head of drama in Sydney had been an ex-sound recordist, and he regarded it as beneath his 'golden standard', so he was very willing to sabotage it. And it was a great excuse for the Sydney mob to say you stuffed up down there."
