= Every Move She Makes =

- Based on: story by Anne Whitehead
- Written by: Catherine Millar
- Directed by: Catherine Millar
- Starring: Julie Nihill; Doug Bowles; Pepe Trevor
- Country of origin: Australia
- Original language: English

Production
- Producer: Erica Rayner
- Cinematography: Ian Warburton
- Editor: Bill Murphy
- Running time: 75 mins
- Production company: ABC

Original release
- Network: ABC
- Release: 1984

Every Move She Makes is a 1984 Australian TV movie about a woman who has an obsessed lover. It was written and directed by Catherine Millar and produced by Erina Rayner. It was the fifth in a collection of six films in the series Sunday Australian Movies.

== Cast ==
- Julie Nihill as Alison Berger
- Doug Bowles as Matthew Pitt
- Pepe Trevor as Jackie
- James Laurie as Andrew
- Bruce Myles as Defence
- Victor Kazan as Prosecurtor
- Bruce Knappett as Berger
- Ross Williams as Alison's Supervisor
- Rob Williams as Sgt. McCechnie
- Shane Connor as Nick
- Mike Bishop as Bob
- Alton Harvey as Mr. Pitt
- Eileen Chapman as Mrs. Pitt
- Vanessa Windsor as Cecilia
- Julie Nihill as Alison Berger

== Reception ==
Marie McNamara of the Age says Nihill's performance is a "masterful rendition" and calls the film a "tense, well-scripted drama." Leonie Lamont in the Sun-Herald said "Every Move She Makes is a disturbing movie. Alison Berger is a normal woman whose life is turned into a nightmare by her tormentor. It happen to anyone." In The Sydney Morning Herald Marian Theobald says it is "the best kind of thriller – if you have a high tolerance level for fear." Dennis Pryor in the Age says "This is not an easy film to write about. It is packed with ideas, images, symbols and perceptions of the way things are for women. Perhaps there are too many ideas to contain in a single film." John O'Hara writes in Cinema Papers "The film works better as a set of variations on a classic horror theme than as an extended account of female isolation in a contemporary male world."
