= Rafferty's Rules =

Television series

- Genre: Legal drama
- Created by: Ben Lewin
- Starring: John Wood; Simon Chilvers; Arky Michael; Terry Serio; Andrew McFarlane; Catherine Wilkin; Katy Brinson; Lisa Crittenden; Mouche Phillips
- Country of origin: Australia
- No. of episodes: 86

Production
- Running time: 50 minutes

Original release
- Network: Seven Network
- Release: 12 February 1987 – 2 February 1991

Rafferty's Rules is an Australian television drama series which ran from 1987 to 1991 on the Seven Network.

The producers of the series were Posie Graeme-Evans (1987–1988), and Denis Phelen. The directors were Graham Thorburn, Mike Smith and Russell Webb. The writers were David Allen, John Upton, Tim Gooding and David Marsh.

Rafferty's Rules was one of the first programs undertaken by the Seven Network’s then new in-house drama unit, going into production in May 1985 as "a 15-part courtroom drama". The program had started out as a pilot episode, recorded in early 1984 with the actor Chris Haywood in the lead role. When the pilot episode was remounted later in 1984, Chris Haywood wasn't available, and the lead role was re-cast to John Wood. This second recording was eventually broadcast as the program's first episode. Initially it was hoped that the program would make its debut during the 1985 ratings season, and there was an option to extend the series to 26 episodes if the initial response was positive.

By mid-1986, the media was asking questions as to why the series, "which had more pilots than TAA", had yet to appear. On Sunday, 15 June 1986, The Sun-Herald TV Guide said, "The series was made last year, and scripting of a new series has almost been completed".

Rafferty's Rules eventually debuted on the Seven Network in February 1987.

The series was also shown in New Zealand on TV3 in 1989, and in the UK on the Satellite channel Lifestyle in 1991. In New Zealand, it was shown on Fridays at 9:30 p.m. In the UK, it was shown daily at 14:00.

In Australia, the series was last replayed nationally at 3 p.m. weekdays in 2006 on the Seven Network, although not entirely. Prior to that, Seven broadcast the series at the 10–11 a.m. weekday timeslot in the late 1990s. More recently, in 2020, the series was available on the 7plus "on-demand" service.

== Awards ==
John Wood received the Logie Award for Most Outstanding Actor in both 1988 and 1989, and Catherine Wilkin received the Logie Award for Most Outstanding Actress in 1988.

Rafferty's Rules was named Best Drama Series at the 1988 Penguin Awards, Peter Carroll won Best Actor in a Series and Michael Cove won Best Scriptwriter for Drama Series.

== Plot ==
Michael Aloysius Rafferty, who is a stipendiary magistrate, drives to work in an old blue VW Kombi van. He owns a cat named Rhubarb.

Rafferty is separated from his wife, with whom he had two children (a son and a daughter).

Rafferty also has an older daughter, Rebecca Browning, who is in her early twenties—and of whose existence he was unaware until she contacted him after she had grown up. (Rebecca's mother is a woman who Michael Rafferty had known before he met his wife, and who he had not seen since his marriage.)

Rafferty also has a brother, Patrick Rafferty, who is a state Member of Parliament.

== Cast ==
=== Main / regular ===
- John Wood as Michael Rafferty, S.M.
- Simon Chilvers as Sgt. Julian Flicker, Police Prosecutor
- Arky Michael as Fulvio Frangellomini, Court Clerk
- Catherine Wilkin as Paulyne Gray, Public Defender
- Katy Brinson as Lisa Blake, Public Defender

=== Recurring ===
Actor	Role	Eps.
Andrew McFarlane	Sgt. Gibson, Police Prosecutor	10 episodes
Julie Nihill	Cathy Gregory	3 episodes
John Gregg	Baraclough	6 episodes
Lisa Crittenden	Sandra Frangellomini	5 episodes
Michael Long	Kilminster	3 episodes
Paul Chubb	Patrick Rafferty	3 episodes
Richard Carter	Detective Sgt. Brown	21 episodes
Rhondda Findleton	Sue Gibson	4 episodes
Terry Serio	Bomber Clayton, Police Prosecutor	4 episodes
Tina Bursill	Erica Jamison	2 episodes

== Series location ==
The series is based at a Magistrates' Court in Manly (a Sydney beachside suburb), over which Rafferty presided.
