= Pepe Trevor =

Australian actress, screenwriter, journalist and author and visual artist

- Born: Penelope Trevor; 1960 (age 65–66); Sydney, Australia
- Other name: Pepe Trevor-Goodall
- Occupations: Actress; author; journalist; visual arts
- Years active: 1977–2005 (as actress)
- Notable work: Prisoner (1985–86)
- Spouse: Matthew Arnold (m.1985–?)
- Children: 2
- Parent: Marie Trevor (mother)

Penelope Trevor (born 1960) professionally known as Pepe Trevor, is an Australian former actress, screenwriter, journalist and author and visual artist, who is perhaps best known for her role as young card shark and trouble-maker, Alexis "Lexie" Patterson in television series Prisoner (1985–86).

== Biography ==
Trevor was born in Sydney, and moved to Melbourne at the age of six. She made a name as an actress in various Australian television series during the 1980s. Later in life, Trevor began writing, and won the Dobbie Award in the 1997 Nita Kibble Literary Awards for her first novel, Listening for Small Sounds. Her second novel, Another Man's Office, came out in 2000. As a journalist, Trevor has contributed articles for The Melbourne Weekly Magazine. Trevor was married to violinist and music teacher, Matthew Arnold, and they have two sons. She is the daughter of television producer, Marie Trevor (born Brisbane, Queensland, 1922 – 7 June 2000), who also worked on Prisoner.

She was portrayed by Sarah Snook in the 2015 Australian romantic drama film, Holding the Man, based on her friend, Timothy Conigrave's, memoir of the same name.

== Bibliography ==
- Listening for Small Sounds. (1996)
- Another Man's Office. (2000)

== Filmography ==
Title	Year	Role	Type
1977	The Sullivans	Patricia	TV series
1979	Skyways		TV series
1980	All the Green Year	Kitty	TV series
	A Country Practice		TV series
1981	I Can Jump Puddles	Pretty Girl	TV miniseries
1979–81	Cop Shop	Lindy Turner, Sarah Moore, Kidnap Victim, Sue Dawson, Sue Powell	TV series
1982	Lonely Hearts		Feature film
1984	Every Move She Makes	Jackie	TV film
1985–86	Prisoner	Lexie Patterson	TV series
1991–92	Kelly	Alice	TV series
1991	Col'n Carpenter	Radio host	TV series
1993	Say a Little Prayer	Shop Assistant	Film
1994–96	Blue Heelers	Carla Houghton, Maria Baker	TV series
1994–95	Janus	Sandy	TV series
1995	Correlli	Karen Hodges	TV miniseries
1996	Law of the Land	Lisa Blake	TV series
1997	Road to Nhill	Anne	Feature film
2002	Stingers	Helen Vanderhoven	TV series
2002	Guinevere Jones	Mrs. Blatt	TV series
2004	Fergus McPhail	Matron	TV series
2005	MDA	Leonie Joyce	TV series
2022	Talking Prisoner	Self	
