= Ben Stewart (Blue Heelers) =

- Blue Heelers character
- First appearance: "Victims"; 1 July 1998
- Last appearance: "Away Games"; 6 October 2004
- Portrayed by: Paul Bishop

In-universe information
- Occupation: Detective Acting Sergeant; Senior Constable; Acting Sergeant; Sergeant
- Family: Liz Stewart (sister)
- Spouse: Angel White; Rachel Stewart
- Significant other: Marriasa Caddrock
- Children: Madeleine Stewart (daughter); Emma Stewart (daughter); Josh Stewart (son)

Benjamin "Ben" Stewart is a fictional character from the Australian police drama Blue Heelers, played by Paul Bishop. He made his first appearance during the fifth season episode "Victims", broadcast on 1 July 1998.

== Storylines ==
His first appearance on the series took place in the middle of season 5 as a guest, before returning to the series as a full-time cast member from later in season 5 until season 11. Initially, he was a visiting Detective Acting Sergeant from the Organised Crime Squad, but was accused of the murder of a suspect by another visitor, Detective Sergeant Peppy Romano of the Homicide Squad. After it was discovered that Romano himself was responsible for the murder, as well as the attempted framing of Ben Stewart, Ben assaulted Peppy while Peppy was handcuffed, which led to Peppy being dismissed from the force and charged, and Ben was demoted back into uniform as a Senior Constable. Shortly after, he was then posted to Mount Thomas permanently.

In the series, he fell for Maggie Doyle upon arriving and the two had a brief relationship, but later on in the series, Maggie chose P.J. Hasham instead.

Ben is divorced from his wife Rachael, and has three children: Madeline, Emma and Josh. While they live with their mother, Emma also spent a short amount of time living with Ben. At the start of the 8th season, Ben learned that Rachael and her husband Frank planned to move with his children over to Perth, where Ben would be less likely to see them, and for a short while he planned to sue Rachael for custody, but due to a similar case at the time that ended badly for all concerned, he had a change of heart and did not fight the move to Perth.

Ben was depicted as having a problem with alcoholism towards the end of season 9, and the first half of season 10, suspected to be fuelled by both being passed over for promotion, and that his children had been moved to the other side of the country. Later in season 10 he meets a woman in the Salvation Army named Marrissa Caddrock, it leads Ben to join the Salvation Army including taking a vow of chastity, the two later begin a relationship together and go on to become engaged.

At the end of season 10, Ben shot and killed police colleague Susie Raynor's paralyzed husband, Brad in order to save her life, a scandal then ensues in Court when false accusations are made by Brad's sister that a sexual relationship between him and Susie was the real reason for the shooting. Ben was cleared of the charges and despite the seemingly resolved issues, Marrissa breaks off their engagement. Ben also finally gained promotion to the rank of Sergeant at the start of season 11.

After the Station bombing in season 11 and the subsequent death of close friend Jo, Ben blames himself for her death as he made her stay at the station, Ben and Susie grieve Jo's death by going on to seek comfort with one another and start a brief relationship, but like Maggie, she had feelings for another colleague (Evan 'Jonesy' Jones) and breaks up with Ben.

Soon after Susie left him Ben again finds himself in the position of having to shoot someone in order to save a colleague's life, this time Jonesy's, in this case though he doesn't have the nerve and hesitates so Jonesy is forced to save himself. Jonesy then accuses Ben of wanting him dead because of Susie's feelings for him and despite Susie's rebuttal of Jonesy's claims she still tells a disillusioned Ben to move on and accept that the two of them are over. This coupled with the current case he's working on lead Ben to question his life not only as a policeman but in general which leaves him at breaking point and even contemplating suicide until he receives a call from his son that changes his mind. Ben immediately leaves the police force and moves to Perth to be closer to his kids.

== Reception ==
For his portrayal of Ben, Bishop received a nomination for the Most Popular New Talent – Male accolade at the 1999 Logie Awards. While reviewing the character's first episode, Ali Gripper from The Sydney Morning Herald stated that Ben "provides P.J. with some much needed rivalry for Maggie Doyle's affections", which prompted P.J. to finally ask her out.
