= Simone McAullay =

Australian actress (born 1976)

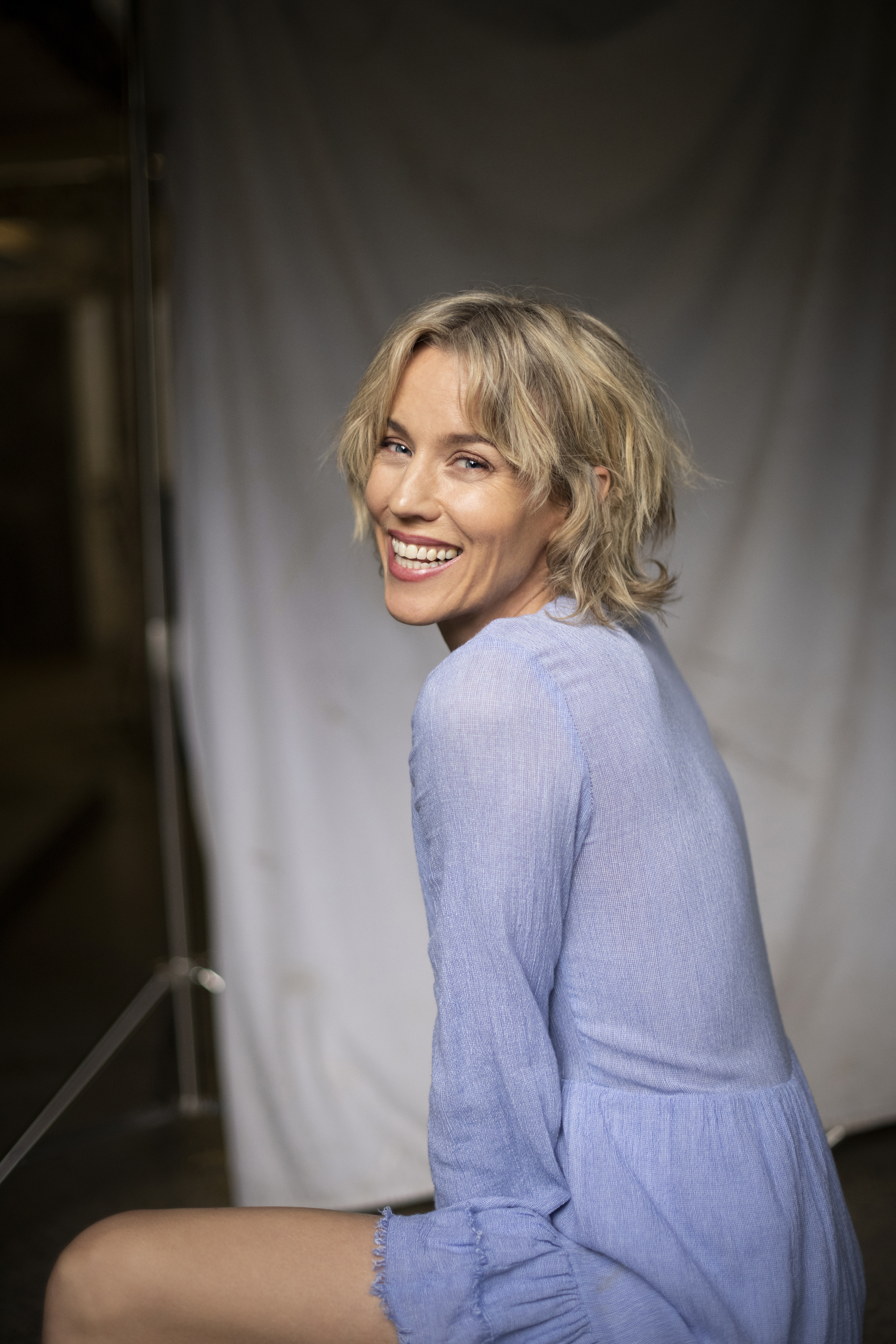
- McAullay in 2022
- Born: 14 April 1976 (age 50); Perth, Western Australia
- Occupation: Actress
- Years active: 2001–present

Simone McAullay (born 14 April 1976) is an Australian actress.

== Early life ==
Born in Perth, Western Australia, McAullay moved to the East Coast as a late teenager, living in Byron Bay, and in the late 1990s, she auditioned to study at The Actors Centre in Sydney. After several years of study there, she graduated in 2000.

== Career ==
In 2001, she was selected for the role of Angie McIntyre in the series Crash Palace. Also in 2001, she played the role of Mrs Harrison in the feature film, Invincible.

In a breakthrough role, from 2003 until 2006, she played the role of Senior Constable Susie Raynor on popular Australian drama series Blue Heelers. In 2007, McAullay appeared in a recurring role as Vivian Anderson on Home and Away for 15 episodes. She returned to Home and Away in April 2008 for five episodes. In July 2008, she portrayed forensic policewoman Jessica Mackay in the TV drama series, The Strip, a police crime drama set on the Gold Coast in Queensland, for the Nine Network.

From 2013 to 2015, she auditioned from Australia for a role of hotelier Becca Fisher in the high-profile ITV drama series Broadchurch. After being selected for the role, she relocated to the UK to begin work on the series, which became a critically acclaimed drama. Whilst in the UK, she had guest roles as Janine in The Smoke on Sky1, in the finale of The IT Crowd, and as Ruth Culver on Holby City. She also enjoyed a guest role on live recorded sitcom Count Arthur Strong and played Lyra in indie feature film Access All Areas. In 2016, she played the role of Jess Philips in the BBC Birmingham series, The Coroner.

After arriving back home in Australia in 2018, Simone joined the cast of The Commons as Francesca Boulay for streaming service Stan in 2019. In 2020, Simone played Alisa Black in three episodes of Cowboy Bebop, for Netflix US, filmed in New Zealand. In 2022, she joined the cast of La Brea season 2 as Kiera, for NBC.

== Filmography ==
=== Film ===
Year	Title	Role	Note
2001	Invincible	Mrs. Harrison	Film

=== Television ===
Year	Title	Role	Note
2001	Crash Palace	Angie McIntye	TV series (1 episode)
2003–2006	Blue Heelers	Susie Raynor	TV series (101 episodes)
2007–2008	Home and Away	Viv Anderson	TV series (9 episodes)
2008	The Strip	Jessica Mackay	TV series (13 episodes)
2013–2015	Broadchurch	Becca Fisher	TV series (14 episodes)
2013	The IT Crowd	Shop Assistant	TV series (1 episode)
2014	The Smoke	Janine	TV series (1 episode)
2014	Holby City	Ruth Culver	TV series (1 episode)
2015	Count Arthur Strong	Annabel	Episode 2.7 "Fame at Last"
2016	The Coroner	Jess Phelps	Episode 2.1 "The Drop Zone"
2019	Home and Away	Teresa Masterson	TV series
2019	The Commons	Francesca Boulay	TV series
2020	Cowboy Bebop	Alisa Black	TV series
2022	La Brea	Kiera	TV series, season 2
