= Danny Raco =

Australian actor and director (born 1979)

- Born: 24 December 1979 (age 46); Rome, Italy
- Occupations: Actor, director
- Years active: 1998–present

Danny Raco (born 24 December 1979) is an Italian Australian actor and director, known for his television work on Home and Away and Blue Heelers..

Raco was born in Rome, Italy.

== Career ==
He got his start playing Marco Vialli on the teenage soap opera Heartbreak High from 1998 to 1999. In 2001, he joined the cast of a primetime soap opera, Home and Away, playing Alex Poulos.

In 2004, Raco chose to leave Home and Away to pursue the role of Constable Joss Peroni on Blue Heelers. He remained with the show until its end in 2006. He returned to Home and Away in June 2007, and is now a director on the series.

== Filmography ==
Acting
Year	Title	Role	Notes
1999	All Saints	Goose Goozens	Season 2, episode 32
1999	Heartbreak High	Marco Vialli	Season 7 (22 episodes)
2001–04, 2007	Home and Away	Alex Poulos	Seasons 14–17 (main cast), Season 20 (recurring)
2003	Home and Away: Hearts Divided	Alex Poulos	Direct-to-video special
2004–07	Blue Heelers	Joss Peroni	Seasons 11–13 (main cast, 68 episodes)
2007	Almost	Trip Wolf	Feature film
2008	Crooked Business	Eddie	Feature film

Directing
Year	Title	Notes
2007–present	Home and Away	Season 20–present (600+ episodes)
2017–19	Drop Dead Weird	Seasons 1–2 (30 episodes)

== Personal life ==
While on Home and Away, he dated co-stars Tammin Sursok and Ada Nicodemou, who played his sister Leah.
