= Paul Bishop (actor) =

Australian actor and politician

- Born: 4 September 1966 (age 60); Gladstone, Queensland
- Occupations: Actor; Director; Politician
- Years active: 1997–present
- Spouse: Elise Parups
- Children: 4

Paul Bishop is an Australian actor and politician who has served as the Division 10 Councillor in Redland City since 2012.

== Early life ==
Bishop was born in Gladstone, Queensland and raised in Wynnum, Queensland. He attended Brisbane State High School.

== Career ==
Bishop's film debut was in Bruce Beresford's 1997 movie Paradise Road, and appeared as Sergeant Ben Stewart on Blue Heelers from 1998 to 2004 for which he received Logie nominations in both 1999 and 2000. Other roles include the telemovie Never Tell me Never, MDA III, Heartbreak High, and G.P. with ABCTV, House Gang with SBS, and Murder Call for Channel 9.

Theatre roles include The Importance of Being Earnest, Three Days of Rain, Money and Friends, Take Me Out, The Shaughraun, at Melbourne Theatre Company, Blackrock, The John Wayne Principle and Anthony Crowley's The Frail Man at Melbourne's Playbox, The John Wayne Principle, As You Like It, Poor Super Man, Saint Joan, Amy's View and Money and Friends with Sydney Theatre Company. Romeo and Juliet, Oedipus Rex, Away, Taming of the Shrew, The Game of Love and Chance and more than 20 other professional credits with Queensland Theatre Company since 1986.

In 2006, Bishop appeared in the movie 48 Shades, based on the Nick Earls novel 48 Shades of Brown and he appeared on stage in Operator for La Boite Theatre, The Carnivores for Black Swan Theatre, Perth, The Woman Before and Puss in Boots with Queensland Theatre Company. In 2007 he performed in and toured Private Fears in Public Places for QTC and NSW tour, and played a minor role in the feature How to Change in 9 Weeks.

== Filmography ==
=== Film ===
Year	Title	Role	Type
1997	Paradise Road	Dennis Leighton-Jones	Feature film
1998	Never Tell Me Never	Scott	TV movie
2006	48 Shades	Mr Wilkes	Feature film
2009	In Her Skin	Doctor	Feature film
2010	Sisters of War	Geoff Lempriere	TV movie
2015	Skin	Dave	Short film
2015	The Fear of Darkness	Scientist	Feature film
2018	Refraction	Jay's Father	Short film

=== Television ===
Year	Title	Role	Type
1996	House Gang	Duane Bradley	TV series, season 1, 1 episode
1996	G.P.	Al Tynan	TV series, 1 episode
1997	Heartbreak High	Tim	TV series, 1 episode
1997	Murder Call	Mike Olsen	TV series, season 1, 1 episode
1998-2004	Blue Heelers	Ben Stewart	TV series, 256 episodes
2001	The Weakest Link	Self	TV series, 1 episode
2005	MDA II	Dr Tim Whitney (intern)	TV series, 4 episodes
2006	H_{2}O: Just Add Water	Mitch	TV series, 3 episodes
2008	TV Land: Myths and Legends	Self	TV series, 1 episode
2013	Reef Doctors	Inspector Matthew Stanton	TV miniseries, 1 episode
2015-16	Mako: Island of Secrets	Dr Ross	TV series, 4 episodes
2016	Wanted	Bernie	TV series, 2 episodes
2018-21	The Bureau of Magical Things	Jared	TV series, 8 episodes
