= Samantha Tolj =

Australian actress (born 1982)

- Born: 12 June 1982 (age 43); Perth, Western Australia, Australia
- Occupation: Actress
- Years active: 2000–present

Samantha Tolj (born 12 June 1982) is an Australian actress, known for her roles as Kelly O'Rourke in Blue Heelers, Daria Hennessy in Home and Away, and Sian Parry in Packed to the Rafters.

== Early life ==
Born in Perth, her father is Croatian and mother is Anglo Celtic Australian. After taking an interest in acting, Tolj was enrolled in the Victorian Youth Theatre when she was 10 years old.

== Career ==
Tolj guest starred on various television series, including Stingers, Marshall Law, After the Deluge, and MDA. She had a recurring role in the eighth and ninth seasons of Blue Heelers as teenage rebel Louelle Nixon.

In 2004, Tolj was one of four new cast members to join the main cast of Blue Heelers. She played police constable Kelly O'Rourke. For her performance, Tolj received a nomination for the Logie Award for Most Popular New Female Talent in 2005. She remained with the show until it ended in 2006. In 2007, Tolj played a guest role in McLeod's Daughters. In 2010, Tolj joined the cast of Home and Away as Shandi Ayres. Tolj joined the cast of Packed to the Rafters as Sian Parry in early 2012. She also appeared in Ed Kavalee's film Scumbus, which aired on Network Ten in November 2012.

== Filmography ==
Television appearances
Year	Title	Role	Notes
2000	Pig's Breakfast	Shaz	Episode: "With Friends Like These"
2000–2003	Blue Heelers	Louelle Nixon	Recurring
2002	Marshall Law	Karen	Episode: "Dogs, Wives and Videotape"
2002	Stingers	Brittany	Episode: "A Little Crush"
2003	Stingers	Lauren Davies	Recurring
2003	After the Deluge	Yashi	TV film
2003	MDA	Lexi Tickner	Episode: "The Samaritan Kind"
2004–2006	Blue Heelers	Kelly O'Rourke	Main cast
2005	Last Man Standing	Mish	Episode: "1.1"
2006	Real Stories	Tonya Blunt	Episode: "1.3"
2007	McLeod's Daughters	Heather Richardson	Episode: "Sisters Are Doing It for Themselves"
2008	Rush	Graffiti Artist	Episode: "1.6"
2008	Satisfaction	Adama	Episode: "Last Look"
2009	Rescue: Special Ops	Bronte	Episode: "1.12"
2010–2011	Home and Away	Shandi Ayres/Daria Hennessy	Recurring
2011	Rescue: Special Ops	Simone Abrahams	Episode: "3.19"
2011–2013	Packed to the Rafters	Sian Parry	13 episodes
2014	Fat Tony & Co.	Renee Mokbel	6 episodes
2019	Glitch	Slipper	Episode "3.3", "3.6"
2019–2022	Five Bedrooms	Rebecca Bourke	6 episodes
2021	Wentworth	Detective Carr	2 episodes

Film appearances
Year	Title	Role	Notes
2003	Heartworm	Anna	
2011	Scumbus	Amy	
2022	Darklands	Jamie Connard	
2022	A Perfect Pairing	Hazel Vaughn	
