= John Wood (actor, born 1946) =

Australian actor (born 1946)

- Born: 14 July 1946 (age 80); Melbourne, Victoria, Australia
- Education: National Institute of Dramatic Art (BFA)
- Occupations: Actor, scriptwriter
- Years active: 1966–present
- Known for: Rafferty's Rules as Michael Rafferty; Blue Heelers as Tom Croydon
- Spouse: Leslie Wood
- Children: 2

John Wood (born 14 July 1946) is an Australian television Gold Logie Award-winning actor and scriptwriter.

Wood has appeared in numerous theatre and TV productions, but is best known for his roles in the legal drama Rafferty's Rules as Stipendiary Magistrate Michael Rafferty and in the long-running police drama Blue Heelers, as Tom Croydon both for the Seven Network.

== Early life ==
Wood began studying drama at National Institute of Dramatic Art (NIDA) in 1966, where he performed in a student production of a play called Eh? directed by Max Gillies and co-starring Tony Taylor.

== Career ==
=== Theatre ===
Wood became a professional actor in 1970, when he worked for the Old Tote Theatre Company in a production of Death of a Salesman.

His notable stage roles include The Club, How to Succeed in Business Without Really Trying, Art, Born Yesterday, The Elocution of Benjamin Franklin, Cats, Chess, Love Letters, Blood Relations, The Real Inspector Hound, Strange Bedfellows: The Musical and Stephen Sewell's It Just Stopped (2006). He played the Bishop of Basingstoke in the 25th anniversary concert of Jekyll & Hyde. He also played the Wizard in The Wizard Of Oz Arena Specular in 2019.

=== Television ===
Wood's first professional television role was in Minus Five with Ken James and Rowena Wallace, which went to air with the title Barrier Reef. A common misconception is that his first role was actually a guest role in soap opera Bellbird.

Wood then appeared in several Australian drama series and miniseries, in minor roles. He also played the co-lead role of Stokey in ABC drama series The Truckies in 1978, also writing an episode. Additionally, he wrote eleven episodes of the series Prisoner, and several episodes of Cop Shop.

It wasn't until 1987 that Wood became a well-known actor, taking the lead in drama series Rafferty's Rules, as magistrate Michael Rafferty. He twice won a Logie Award for Most Outstanding Actor, for his portrayal of Rafferty during its four seasons.

In 1993, Wood landed a leading role as Tom Croydon in Blue Heelers, which went on to become a big hit in Australia. He was one of only two actors (the other being Julie Nihill) to star in the series from its beginning in 1993 to its cancellation in 2006, although Wood's character is the only one to be seen in every single episode. Wood also wrote three episodes for the series.

Wood was a contestant in the 2004 edition of the Australian Dancing with the Stars. The following year, he hosted the mini-documentary series Made in Melbourne, documenting 50 years of HSV7. In 2006, he hosted Channel Nine's travel series Wine Me, Dine Me. He next appeared on Channel Ten 2007 telemovie, Joanne Lees: Murder in the Outback, playing barrister Grant Algie.

In 2009, Wood appeared in drama series The Cut and the historical dramatised documentary Rogue Nation, both on ABC1. He also had a role in the second installment of the Underbelly crime drama franchise, Underbelly: A Tale of Two Cities, playing Murray Farquhar.

In 2010, Wood had a recurring role in Offspring. The following year, he joined the cast of Neighbours for a six-month guest role as Martin Chambers.

In 2012, Wood appeared in Miss Fisher's Murder Mysteries, and had a recurring role in The Doctor Blake Mysteries. In 2013, he had a guest role on It's a Date alongside Denise Scott.

=== Memoirs ===
In August 2020, Wood's memoir, How I Clawed My Way Back to the Middle, was published by Viking.

== Filmography ==
=== Television ===
Year	Title	Role	Notes	Ref
1970	Dynasty	Danny Bernac	1 episode	
1971	Barrier Reef	Chris	1 episode	
1972	Redheap	George	3 episodes	
1972	Catwalk	Ricky Novak	7 episodes	
1972	A Nice Day at the Office	Brian	1 episode	
1972–1975	Homicide	Max Reed / John Hill	2 episodes	
1973	The Taming of the Shrew	Hortensio	TV play	
1973–1975	Matlock Police	Jacko / Cliff	2 episodes	
1974	Out of Love		Anthology series, 1 episode	
1976	Power Without Glory	Sugar Renfrey	21 episodes	
1976–1977	Bluey	Cusack / Terry Carter	2 episodes	
1977	Bellbird		2 episodes	
1977	No Room for the Innocent		TV movie	
1978	The Truckies	Stokey	12 episodes	
1978	Catspaw	Billo	1 episode	
1978–1980	Cop Shop	Jack / John / John Harwood	7 episodes	
1979	Burn the Butterfiles		TV movie	
1980	Lawson's Mates	One Eyed Bogan	1 episode	
1981	The Sullivans	Army Surgeon	2 episodes	
1984	Special Squad	Barron / Crawley	2 episodes	
1984	The Last Bastion	Robert Menzies	Miniseries, 3 episodes	
1985	One Summer Again	Sir Walter Corry	Docudrama miniseries, 3 episodes	
1986–1987	The Challenge	Alan Bond	Miniseries, 6 episodes	
1987–1990	The Flying Doctors	Frank O'Leary / Dennis Cleary	2 episodes	
1987–1991	Rafferty's Rules	Michael Rafferty	86 episodes	
1990	G.P.	Hugh Daly	1 episode	
1991	All Together Now	Detective Grant	1 episode	
1992	Dearest Enemy	Anderson Morley	7 episodes	
1993–1994	Newlyweds	Frank	4 episodes	
1994–2006	Blue Heelers	Tom Croydon	510 episodes	
2007	Joanne Lees: Murder in the Outback	Grant Algie	TV movie	
2009	The Cut	Bill Telford	6 episodes	
2009	Underbelly	Murray	2 episodes	
2009	Rogue Nation	Governor William Bligh	1 episode	
2010	Sleuth 101	Bill	1 episode	
2010	Offspring	Gareth	4 episodes	
2011	Killing Time	Allan Bond	1 episode	
2011–2012	Neighbours	Martin Chambers	5 episodes	
2012	The Strange Calls	Deputy Commissioner Banks	1 episode	
2012	Miss Fisher's Murder Mysteries	Mr Jones	1 episode	
2013	It's a Date	Rex	1 episode	
2013	Paper Giants: Magazine Wars	Ken Crowley	Miniseries, 2 episodes	
2013–2017	The Doctor Blake Mysteries	Patrick Tyneman	23 episodes	
2014	Fresh Blood: Aunty Donna	Crooked Cop	1 episode	
2015	Open Slather	Special guest	2 episodes	
2015	We Are Not Real People	Guest Speaker	1 episode	
2017	True Story with Hamish & Andy	Principal Scott	1 episode	
2018	How to Stay Married	Morrey	1 episode	
2018	Shaun Micallef's Mad as Hell	Unorganised Funerals Salesman	1 episode	

=== Television (as self) ===
Year	Title	Role	Notes	Ref
2012	Who Do You Think You Are?	Participant	1 episode	
2019	The New Full Monty	Participant		
2021	Celebrity Mastermind	Contestant		

=== Film ===
Year	Title	Role	Notes
1972	The Office Picnic	Clyde	Feature film
1977	Blue Fire Lady	Gus	Feature film
1982	Ginger Meggs	Constable Brady	
1985	The Empty Beach	Parker	Feature film
1987	The Bit Part	John Bainbridge	Feature film
1987	Bullseye	Bluey McGurk	Feature film
2004	Hooked	Sir Richard	Short film
2009	Remembering Nigel	John Wood	
2011	Waiting for Robbo	Eric	Short film
2013	Backyard Ashes	Merv	
2016	Brown Paper Bag	School Principal	Short film
2017	Bye Bye Baby		Short film
2022	Beat	Dr. Mondon	
2023	Godless: The Eastfield Exorcism	Detective Chambers	

=== As writer ===
Year	Title	Role	Notes
1974	Flash Nick from Jindavick	Writer	
1978	The Truckies	Writer	1 episode
1979–1980	Prisoner	Writer	11 episodes
1980–1981	Cop Shop	Writer	9 episodes
1989	Sugar and Spice	Writer	2 episodes
1995–1997	Blue Heelers	Writer	3 episodes

== Awards ==
John Wood has won several TV Week Logie Awards over the years and has also been nominated for several.

In 1988 and 1989, Wood received the TV Week Logie Award for 'Most Outstanding Actor' for his work on Rafferty's Rules. In 2006, he was nominated in the same category for his role in Blue Heelers.

Wood was nominated for the Gold Logie for Most Popular Personality on Australian Television every year from 1997 to 2007, for his role in Blue Heelers. After nine consecutive Gold Logie nominations without a win, he was awarded the prize in 2006.

Wood has won the Most Popular Actor award twice (in 2005 and 2006) and has been nominated another eight consecutive times (1996–2003) for his role in Blue Heelers.

Awards and achievements
Preceded by Rove McManus for Rove Live	Gold Logie Award; Most Popular Personality on Australian Television; 2006 for Blue Heelers	Succeeded by Kate Ritchie for Home and Away
