= Julie Nihill =

Australian actress

- Born: 1957 (age 68–69); Melbourne, Australia
- Occupation: Actor
- Years active: 1981–present
- Known for: Blue Heelers as Chris Riley

Julie Nihill (born 1957 in Melbourne) is an Australian actress, voice artist, narrator, producer and writer, best known for her 12-year role as Chris Riley on the police drama Blue Heelers (1994–2006).

== Early life ==
Nihill was drawn to acting through her love of storytelling. She originally studied a Bachelor of Science (Biological Sciences) at La Trobe University, which she abandoned to pursue a career as an actress. She trained at Trinity College London, studying an Associate Diploma in Speech and Drama, and an Associate Diploma in Effective Speaking.

== Career ==
Nihill made her television debut in I Can Jump Puddles (1981) and her film debut in Careful, He Might Hear You (1983). That led to her first lead role, in the ABC TV movie Every Move She Makes, for which she received a Penguin Award, and the miniseries Bodyline, in which Nihill played Jessie Bradman, the wife of Sir Donald Bradman.

Nihill became a household face in 1994 when she was cast as publican and local councillor Chris Riley in the police drama Blue Heelers. Nihill was one of only two actors (the other being John Wood) to star in the series for its entire run.

Nihill had guest roles in television programs including Prisoner: Cell Block H, Sons and Daughters, A Country Practice, Mother and Son, House Husbands, The Leftovers, and Picnic at Hanging Rock.

She is also a theatre performer, having worked with Australian theatre companies such as the Melbourne Theatre Company, the Sydney Theatre Company and the Tasmanian Theatre Company. She has performed numerous radio plays for the ABC, as well as commercial voice-over work and documentary narration. Nihill has also narrated a number of audiobooks.

== Personal life ==
Nihill was married to actor Richard Moir, and they had two daughters, actress Lucy Moir and director Bonnie Moir.

She runs an Australian production company called EarthStar Films.

Nihill has a Graduate Diploma in Education from Mercy College, Melbourne and is registered with the Victorian Department of Education. She is also a Human Potential and Transformation Coach and Facilitator, a qualification she obtained in California.

== Filmography ==
=== Film ===
Year	Title	Role	Type
1982	A Slice of Life	Pam	Feature film
1982	We of the Never Never		Feature film
1983	Careful, He Might Hear You	Diana	Feature film
1983	Undercover	Design Room Girl	Feature film
1985	The Coca-Cola Kid	Marching Girl	Feature film
1985	Rebel	Joycie	Feature film
1986	Kangaroo	Vicki Calcott	Feature film
1988	Boundaries of the Heart	June Thompson	Feature film
1990	Deadly	Jeny	Feature film
2000	The Way of the Birds	Herself (Voice)	Film short
2001	Dalkeith	Sally	Feature film
2015	Holding the Man	Petrea, Pranic Healer (uncredited)	Feature film
2016	The Prince of Chinatown	Mother	Film short
2017	Pillars	Louisa	Film short
2018	Bird	Teacher	Film short
2019	The Diver	Cynthia	Film short
2020	Nursery	Carol	Film short
2020	The Way of the Birds	Narrator / The Mother	Animated short
2020	Love is a Lunatic City	Op-Shop Volunteer	Film short
2021	The Cutting Room	Fay	Film short
2023	Nursery	Carol	Film short

=== Television ===
Year	Title	Role	Type
1981	I Can Jump Puddles	Young Woman	TV miniseries, 1 episode "Getting Your Breath"
1981	The Sullivans	Sue Matthews	TV series, 1 episode
1982	Cop Shop	Raylene Fennell / Christine Powell	TV series, 2 episodes
1982	Holiday Island	Bernadine	TV series, 1 episode
1982	Home	Joy	TV series, 2 episodes
1982	The Young Doctors	Linda Wilson	TV series, 8 episodes
1982; 1983	Prisoner	Lindy Peters / Nurse	TV series, 2 episodes
1983	Starting Out	Tessa Staples	TV series, 1 episode
1984	Bodyline	Jessie Bradman	TV miniseries, 1 episode
1984; 1989	A Country Practice	Michelle Hayden / Dinny	TV series, 4 episodes
1984	Every Move She Makes	Alison Berger	TV movie
1984	The Cowra Breakout	Merle	TV miniseries, 4 episodes
1985	Sons and Daughters	Julie Webb	TV series, 16 episodes
1986	Tusitala	Belle Strong	TV miniseries, 3 episodes
1987	Army Wives	Jill	TV movie
1988; 1991	Rafferty's Rules	Cathy Gregory	TV series, 3 episodes
1989	The Flying Doctors	Jilly Potter	TV series, 1 episode
1992	Mother and Son	Receptionist	TV series, 1 episode
1994–2006	Blue Heelers	Christine 'Chris' Riley	TV series, 507 episodes
1995	Banjo Paterson's The Man from Snowy River (aka Snowy River: The McGregor Saga)	Nora O'Reilly	TV series, season 2, 1 episode
1998	Good Morning Australia	Guest	TV series, 1 episode
2012	Winners & Losers	Pauline Brown	TV series, 1 episode
2012	The Mystery of a Hansom Cab	Mrs. Hableton	TV movie
2014	Worst Year of My Life, Again!	Ms Fowler	TV series, 1 episode
2014	The Greatest Love of All	Gary's Mum	TV series, 1 episode
2017	House Husbands	Bronwyn	TV series, 1 episode
2017	The Leftovers	Sharon	TV series, 1 episode
2017	True Story with Hamish & Andy	Ruth	TV series, 1 episode
2018	Picnic at Hanging Rock	Mrs. Horton	TV miniseries, 1 episode
2018	The Doctor Blake Mysteries	Maggie Butson	TV series, 1 episode
2018	How to Stay Married	Mrs. Veteris	TV series, 1 episode
2019	Neighbours	Sister Grace	TV series, 1 episode

== Theatre ==
Year	Title	Role	Venue / Co.
1980	You're a Good Man, Charlie Brown	Patty	Universal Theatre, Melbourne & Anthill Theatre
1985–86	Mixed Doubles: Tom Thumb the Great	Princess Huncamunca / Foodle	Wharf Theatre with STC
1985–86	Mixed Doubles: Seduced	Miami	Wharf Theatre with STC
1985–86	Mixed Doubles: Family Favourites	Lucy	Wharf Theatre with STC
1985–86	Mixed Doubles: Suddenly Last Summer	Sister Felicity	Wharf Theatre with STC
1986	Wild Honey	Sacha	Playhouse, Adelaide with STCSA
1988–89	Don's Party	Kath	Sydney Opera House, Melbourne Athenaeum with Kinselas
1991	Ursula (Adaptation of D.H. Lawrence's Women in Love)	Ursula	Crossroads Theatre, Sydney
1991	Molly in Bed (Soliloquy from James Joyce's Ulysses)	Clara Mason	Crossroads Theatre, Sydney
1993	Big Toys	Mag	Malthouse Theatre, Melbourne, Ford Theatre, Geelong, Monash University, West Gippsland Arts Centre, Her Majesty's Theatre, Ballarat
1995	The Supper	Erika	Malthouse Theatre, Melbourne with Stables Productions
2001	Return Journey	Barmaid	Montsalvat, Melbourne
2001	The Fire & the Rose	One woman cabaret	Montsalvat, Melbourne
2001	Under Milk Wood	Polly Garter	Montsalvat, Melbourne
2003	Inheritance	Simon Phillips	Playhouse, Melbourne, Sydney Opera House with MTC / STC
2006	Secret Life of Shakespeare	Gertrude / Viola	
2007	The Glass Soldier		Playhouse, Melbourne with MTC
2014	The Glass Menagerie	Amanda	Melbourne Fringe Festival
2017	Bakersfield Mist	Maude	Tasmanian Theatre Company
2020	Running with Emus		La Mama, Melbourne

== Awards ==
Year	Work	Award	Category	Result
1984	Every Move She Makes	Penguin Award	Certificate of Commendation for a Single Performance by a Lead Actress in a One-off Drama	Won
1985	Bodyline	Logie Award	Best New Talent	Nominated
1985	Bodyline	Logie Award	Best Actress in a Miniseries	Nominated
1988	Boundaries of the Heart	Australian Film Institute Award	Best Actress in a Supporting Role	Nominated
