= Blue Heelers season 2 =

Blue Heelers
- Season 2
- No. of episodes: 41

Release
- Original network: Seven Network
- Original release: 21 February – 21 November 1995

Season chronology
- ← Previous; Season 1 Next → Season 3

The second season of the Australian police-drama Blue Heelers premiered on the Seven Network on 21 February 1995 and aired on Tuesday nights at 8:30 PM. The 41-episode season concluded 21 November 1995. The cast for this season was the same as that of the preceding season, without Ann Burbrook as Roz Patterson, and with the introduction of Damian Walshe-Howling as Adam Cooper to take her place. This season of Blue Heelers was released on DVD on 1 December 2005 and was released in a two-part release; and later as a complete set.

== Casting ==
The cast for this season was identical to that of the prior season, with the omission of Ann Burbrook as Roz Patterson and with the introduction of Damian Walshe-Howling as Adam Cooper to take her place.

=== Main ===
- John Wood as Sergeant Tom Croydon
- Julie Nihill as Christine 'Chris' Riley
- Martin Sacks as Senior Detective Patrick Joseph 'P.J.' Hasham
- Lisa McCune as Constable Margaret 'Maggie' Doyle
- William McInnes as Senior Constable Nicholas 'Nick' Schultz
- Grant Bowler as Constable Wayne Patterson
- Damian Walshe-Howling as Constable Adam Cooper

=== Recurring ===
- Peta Doodson as Sergeant → Senior Sergeant Monica Draper
- Beth Buchanan as Susan Croydon
- Michael Isaacs as Clancy Freeman
- Suzi Dougherty as Dr. Mel Carter
- Axl Taylor as Len the barman
- Dennis Miller as Ex-Sergeant Pat Doyle
- Nick Waters as Inspector Ted Faulkner
- Helen Trenos as Celia Donald
- Dale Stevens as Senior Constable / Detective Senior Constable Rose Egan
- Stuart Baker as "Richo"
- Reg Evans as Keith Purvis
- Terry Gill as Chief Superintendent Clive Adamson
- Karen Davitt as Dr. Zoe Hamilton
- Rachel Blakely as Gina Belfanti
- Beverley Evans as Harriet Keppel

=== Guest stars ===
- Robert Grubb as Sergeant Harris
- David Field as Michael "Mick" Doyle
- Maxine Klibingaitis as Judy
- Rebecca Rigg as Kate Kenny
- Hugh Jackman as Brady Jackson
- Libby Tanner as Holly McLeod
- Kris McQuade as Maureen Powers
- Janet Andrewartha as Detective Ryan
- Kerry Armstrong as Sandy Fielding
- Reg Gorman as Freddie
- Lois Collinder as Nina Dwyer
- Kristian Schmid as Aaron Landers
- Jeremy Kewley as Jonathan Ryder
- Gerard Kennedy as Sal D'Angelo
- Samuel Johnson as Dennis Cole

== Episodes ==
No. overall	No. in season	Title	Directed by	Written by	Australian air date
46	1	"Without a Trace"	Mark Piper	Michaeley O'Brien	21 February 1995
A couple go missing from their farm. Rose's ex-husband brings back painful memories. Mount Thomas has its first UFO sighting.
47	2	"A Question of Courage"	Richard Sarell	Anne Brooksbank	28 February 1995
While the Heelers are trying to break up and all-in brawl, Adam deserts them to call for backup on the radio. When he arrives back all he sees is Maggie lying on the floor and everybody's eyes on him. To add to Adam's bad day, he is bitten by a suspect whom he later discovers to have HIV.
48	3	"A Cruel Reality"	Riccardo Pellizzeri	Susan Hore	7 March 1995
The town's first bank robbery puzzles the Heelers and leads to an unexpected suspect
49	4	"Mates"	Gary Conway	Hugh Stuckey	14 March 1995
An old friend of Tom's who betrayed his trust returns to make amends. The ex-con's return to town moves PJ and Rose to reopen his case
50	5	"Out of Harm's Way"	Mark Piper	Peter Gawler	21 March 1995
A man's abduction of his daughter from his ex wife gets Adam personally involved when the man insists on negotiating only with him. Nick finds Adam's gun missing from his locker. He is worried, knowing that Adam is worried at the prospect of being HIV positive. Adam receives his test results.
51	6	"Breaking the Cycle"	Richard Sarell	Judith Colquhoun	28 March 1995
A schoolboy assaults another student and the Heelers uncover a shocking secret about the boy's family.
52	7	"Heavy Traffic"	Riccardo Pellizzeri	Michael Winter	4 April 1995
A traffic blitz in Mount Thomas causes headaches for Tom and the rest of the Heelers when Nick's friend is killed in an accident.
53	8	"Gun Law"	Gary Conway	David Allen	11 April 1995
Maggie's gun goes missing, and there could be dire consequences if it isn't found quickly.
54	9	"Ripples on the Pond"	Brendan Maher	John Coulter	18 April 1995
PJ and Rose investigate a clever lawyer for crimes against a Chinese restaurant owner and his family.
55	10	"Protected Species"	Mark Piper	Max Singer	25 April 1995
An old friend of Tom's is attacked, but charging the offender becomes more complicated than he bargained for.
56	11	"Stop for a Bite"	Karl Steinberg	Tony Morphett	2 May 1995
Rose is sent back to St Davids when it becomes clear that Mount Thomas only needs one CI
57	12	"The Long and Winding Road"	Steve Mann	Anne Brooksbank	9 May 1995
When two female backpackers arrive in Mount Thomas, the male members of the station are soon competing for their attention.
58	13	"The Old School Tie"	Julian McSwiney	Patrick Edgeworth	16 May 1995
When a plane goes down in dense bushland near Mount Thomas, the Heelers are involved in a search and rescue operation, discovering a politician dragging a dead girl from the wreckage.
59	14	"Motherlove"	Mark Piper	Susan Hore	23 May 1995
Maggie gets personally involved with a mother and her two kids, when the mother gets involved with a gang of bikers.
60	15	"Dead Ringer"	Karl Steinberg	Shane Brennan	30 May 1995
Nick has the chance to run the station during Tom's absence, the job is made more complicated by the discovery of an unidentified body in Mount Thomas which brings Nick's old homicide squad rivals to town.
61	16	"The Lolita Blues"	Steve Mann	Peter Gawler	6 June 1995
A school girl moves in with her teacher. PJ investigates two brothers who were the chief suspects in an interstate payroll robbery.
62	17	"Shadowman"	Richard Sarell	Anne Brooksbank	13 June 1995
Nick and Adam investigate a rape in the town of Widgeree.
63	18	"Trust Me"	Chris Martin-Jones	Ruth Field	20 June 1995
Sasha betrays Nick's trust to protect her brother during an investigation into stolen car parts.
64	19	"Parenting"	Mark Piper	Judith Colquhoun	27 June 1995
Nick helps the family of his star basketball player fight back against vandals making their lives a misery.
65	20	"Gun Crazy"	Gary Conway	Russell Haig	4 July 1995
Wayne is thrown into the world of guns when a gunshop is robbed.
66	21	"With Prejudice"	Richard Sarell	Michaeley O'Brien	11 July 1995
The team have to cope with the glare of media attention when a five-year-old girl goes missing.
67	22	"Paranoia (1)"	Chris Martin-Jones	Michael Winter	18 July 1995
A gunman holds Chris and Adam hostage at the Imperial and Tom is shot. When investigators probe allegations of corruption, tempers fray.
68	23	"Paranoia (2)"	Mark Piper	Peter Gawler	25 July 1995
The mood of paranoia intensifies as the Heelers set out to capture the prison escapees and avenge Tom's shooting.
69	24	"The Collector"	Julian McSwiney	Tony Morphett and Wal Saunders	1 August 1995
A routine robbery investigation is complicated when it is discovered that aboriginal artefacts are involved.
70	25	"Homecoming Queen"	Mark Piper	John Wood	8 August 1995
An old schoolfriend visits Tom and soon becomes under suspicion in a robbery investigation.
71	26	"Secrets"	Chris Martin-Jones	Margaret Plumb	15 August 1995
Pro active policing is required when a local schoolgirl becomes the victim of harassment by her classmates after she has an abortion. A gang of bullies plague the school, targeting one girl in particular and the Heelers vow to stamp out the problem.
72	27	"The Last Straw"	Richard Sarrell and Riccardo Pellizzeri	Susan Hore	22 August 1995
The Heelers are embroiled in a bovine saga when a farmer's prize bull is shot dead. Meanwhile, Adam realises that Chris is not interested in him.
73	28	"The Best of Rivals"	Brian McDuffie	Fred Clarke	29 August 1995
The lives of Wayne and Nick tragically collide, when Nick befriends a young graffiti artist and Wayne helps a mate. Maggie and Wayne prepare for the Senior Constable exam.
74	29	"Swings and Roundabouts"	Julian McSwiney	David Allen	5 September 1995
The Blue Heelers investigate a drug theft at the hospital.
75	30	"Double Jeopardy (1)"	Chris Martin-Jones	Ysabelle Dean	12 September 1995
The team learn that a well known trouble maker has been released early from prison. A criminal's wife agrees to help the police, who can't protect her. Wayne gets involved with the wife of a criminal.
76	31	"Double Jeopardy (2)"	Mark Piper	Michaeley O'Brien	19 September 1995
The Kennys rough up Wayne, he is forced to fight for his career and reputation as Kate charges him with sexual assault. Wayne's choices lands him in hot water.
77	32	"The Mongrel Factor"	Brian McDuffie	Peter Gawler	26 September 1995
Gold Fever overcomes the citizens of Mount Thomas, with potentially tragic consequences.
78	33	"Just Desserts"	Julian McSwiney	Anne Brooksbank	3 October 1995
Maggie reveals hidden talents when she fills in as Police Prosecutor during a trial. But can she match up against the experience of Defence Lawyer Brady Jackson, after which she becomes friendly with, PJ becomes jealous.
79	34	"Unnatural Death"	Chris Martin-Jones	Cassandra Carter	10 October 1995
When a Vietnam veteran is found murdered in his hospital bed, the Blue Heelers must solve the mystery.
80	35	"Tough Love"	Mark Piper	Louise Crane	17 October 1995
Nick relives an old nightmare.
81	36	"A Question of Loyalties"	Brian McDuffie	Michael Winter	24 October 1995
Maggie enlists help from an old ally (her father) when trying to uncover the truth behind allegations against PJ.
82	37	"Vow of Silence"	Steve Mann	Robert Harris and Peter Dick	17 October 1995
A young girl's trauma creates a conflict for the Heelers; a conflict between Faith and Prejudice.
83	38	"Juggling with Smoke"	Gary Conway	Dave Worthington	30 October 1995
It may be Melbourne Cup day but, for PJ, all bets are off, he has a major crime to solve.
84	39	"The Discount Suit"	Karl Steinberg	Fred Clarke	7 November 1995
Wayne has to balance loyalty to his job and a friend when a mate's blood sample goes missing.
85	40	"Brotherly Love (1)"	Chris Martin-Jones	David Allen	14 November 1995
Adam's brother visits for Christmas. Tom's Christmas party ends in horror.
86	41	"Brotherly Love (2)"	Brian McDuffe	Peter Gawler	21 November 1995
Gina's life is thrown into chaos and Monica Draper arrives to help with the rape investigation. Chris and Adam break up.

== DVD release ==
The Complete Second Season: Part 1
Set Details	Special Features
19 Episodes (855 Mins.); Episodes 18 – 36; 5-Disc Set; Full Frame; English (Dolby Digital 2.0 Stereo)	Slipcase Packaging; Photo Gallery; Audio Commentary on Ep. 19: 'Good Cop, Bad Cop'
Release Dates	Slipcase Packaging; Photo Gallery; Audio Commentary on Ep. 19: 'Good Cop, Bad Cop'
Australia	Slipcase Packaging; Photo Gallery; Audio Commentary on Ep. 19: 'Good Cop, Bad Cop'
1 December 2005	Slipcase Packaging; Photo Gallery; Audio Commentary on Ep. 19: 'Good Cop, Bad Cop'

The Complete Second Season: Part 2
Set Details	Special Features
18 Episodes (810 Mins.); Episodes 37 – 54; 5-Disc Set; Full Frame; English (Dolby Digital 2.0 Stereo)	Slipcase Packaging; Photo Gallery; Audio Commentary on Ep. 44: 'Luck of the Draw'
Release Dates	Slipcase Packaging; Photo Gallery; Audio Commentary on Ep. 44: 'Luck of the Draw'
Australia	Slipcase Packaging; Photo Gallery; Audio Commentary on Ep. 44: 'Luck of the Draw'
1 December 2005	Slipcase Packaging; Photo Gallery; Audio Commentary on Ep. 44: 'Luck of the Draw'

The Complete Second Season
Set Details	Special Features
37 Episodes (1665 Mins.); Episodes 18 – 54; 11-Disc Set; Full Frame; English (Dolby Digital 2.0 Stereo)	Slipcase Packaging; Photo Gallery; Audio Commentary on Ep. 19: 'Good Cop, Bad Cop'; Audio Commentary on Ep. 44: 'Luck of the Draw'
Release Dates	Slipcase Packaging; Photo Gallery; Audio Commentary on Ep. 19: 'Good Cop, Bad Cop'; Audio Commentary on Ep. 44: 'Luck of the Draw'
Australia	Slipcase Packaging; Photo Gallery; Audio Commentary on Ep. 19: 'Good Cop, Bad Cop'; Audio Commentary on Ep. 44: 'Luck of the Draw'
1 December 2005	Slipcase Packaging; Photo Gallery; Audio Commentary on Ep. 19: 'Good Cop, Bad Cop'; Audio Commentary on Ep. 44: 'Luck of the Draw'
