= Blue Heelers season 4 =

Blue Heelers
- Season 4
- No. of episodes: 42

Release
- Original network: Seven Network
- Original release: 10 February – 25 November 1997

Season chronology
- ← Previous; Season 3 Next → Season 5

The fourth season of the Australian police-drama Blue Heelers premiered on the Seven Network on 10 February 1997 and aired on Tuesday nights at 8:30 PM. The 42-episode season concluded 25 November 1997. The main cast was the same as the previous season, except without Grant Bowler as Constable Wayne Patterson. Like previous seasons, the fourth season was released on DVD as a two part set and as a complete set, both on 6 April 2006.

== Casting ==
In the episode, "Fool For Love", Jane Allsop guest starred. She impressed the producers so much that they would later invite her back to the show in a main role as Jo Parrish.

=== Main ===
- John Wood as Sergeant Tom Croydon
- Julie Nihill as Christine 'Chris' Riley
- Martin Sacks as Senior Detective Patrick Joseph 'P.J.' Hasham
- Lisa McCune as Constable Margaret 'Maggie' Doyle
- William McInnes as Senior Constable Nicholas 'Nick' Schultz
- Damian Walshe-Howling as Constable Adam Cooper
- Tasma Walton as Probationary Constable Deirdre 'Dash' McKinley

=== Recurring ===
- Peta Doodson as Senior Sergeant → Inspector Monica Draper
- Beth Buchanan as Susan Croydon
- Michael Isaacs as Clancy Freeman
- Axl Taylor as Len the barman
- Dennis Miller as Ex-Sergeant Pat Doyle
- Jeremy Kewley as Tony Timms
- Reg Evans as Keith Purvis
- Terry Gill as Chief Superintendent Clive Adamson
- Karen Davitt as Doctor Zoe Hamilton
- Rachel Blakely as Gina Belfanti
- Don Bridges as Charlie Clarke
- Marie Trevor as Lelia Clegg
- Pauline Terry-Bietz as Beth McKinley
- Neil Pigot as Inspector Russell Falcon-Price
- Adam May as Ellis Corby
- Peter Aanensen as Merv Poole
- Kevin Harrington as Charlie McKinley
- Kate Atkinson as Stacey Norse
- Stuart Baker as "Richo"

=== Guest stars ===
- Anne Phelan
- Stefan Dennis
- Vincent Gil
- Alan Dale
- Peta Brady
- Brett Climo
- Wendy Strehlow
- Fiona Corke
- Lesley Baker

== Reception ==
The 1997 season was the highest rated for the show, and was the number one show on Australian television for that year, averaging 2,441,000 viewers in the five cities for the year.

Two of the most popular episodes remain the two-parter "Gold" and "Fool's Gold", in which PJ and Maggie are trapped down a mine shaft and release their sexual tension.

== Episodes ==
No. overall	No. in season	Title	Directed by	Written by	Australian air date
129	1	"Mad Dogs and Englishmen"	Richard Sarell	Ysabelle Dean	10 February 1997
The inhabitants of Mount Thomas have a suspected outbreak of "Mad Cow Disease" and people do not seem to be coping, especially when they suspect it was Mad Cow Disease that tragically killed Gina and threatens to take Maggie's life.
130	2	"Under Siege"	Chris Langman	Susan Hore	10 February 1997
Nick, having been left in charge of the station, is trapped in the station with Adam and Dash with no way of outside contact while P.J is desperately searching for a way to save Maggie's life and to find the cause of her mystery illness.
131	3	"Working Lunch"	Kevin Carlin	Bill Garner	11 February 1997
An extortionist threatens to blow up Bluey's Indian restaurant and a bullet hole is found in Katrina Hagen's window where she works with Shire President Roger Payne. Meanwhile, Dash's love of gossip threatens to get her into hot water on a surveillance operation.
132	4	"Immaculate Misconception"	Grant Brown	John Wood	18 February 1997
Clancy is accused of rape which he happily admits to. Leonie says she doesn't feel well and is taken to the doctor to be told she is pregnant. Tom has to contend with Chris' emotional cousin Domenic and Adam declares his feelings for Dash but doesn't get the response he hoped for.
133	5	"Reports of Damage and Loss"	Richard Sarell	John Banas	25 February 1997
The weather is terrible, it is pouring rain and Mount Thomas are suffering thunderstorms they have rarely seen, nobody would want to be outside in this weather; unfortunately there are children out and Nick and Adam are sent to save them. But, when Nick and Adam arrive back at the station hours later to fill out a Report of Damage and Loss, they are cold, soaking wet and both have broken spirits.
134	6	"Fowl Play"	Chris Langman	Peter Dick	4 March 1997
Nick is astonished to find the shooter of a young protester is Zoe Hamilton. Ken Norse accuses Matthew Prentice of stealing one of his ducks. Norse later falls seriously ill after eating a specially prepared duck at the Imperial. Lead poisoning is the result and his two children become the main suspects and admit to hating him but not killing him.
135	7	"The Luck of the Irish"	Kevin Carlin	Cassandra Carter	11 March 1997
Chris' new love Sean is found murdered in the cemetery. and Tom finds there is no record of him or his teenage son Conor entering Australia.
136	8	"Bloodstained Angels"	Grant Brown	David Phillips	18 March 1997
The Heelers must determine whether they are looking for a publicity stunt, an avenging father or an adoring fan after one of the station's vehicles is defaced, and a car is torched in the car park of the Commercial when a heavy metal band arrives in Mount Thomas.
137	9	"Charity Begins at Home"	Richard Sarell	Annie Beach	8 April 1997
Joanne Mason accuses her husband of deliberately pushing her out of their car. Dash moves in with Maggie, and throws out Maggie's favourite jumper by mistake. Mrs Mason moves in with Dash and Maggie. Clothes are stolen from a Salvation Army bin and money and the clothes are found in Capt. Ingrid Perry's Possession who is targeted for attempted murder.
138	10	"Fool for Love"	Richard Jasek	Emma Honey	15 April 1997
Adam has a surprise announcement, but a crisis involving a phony dating agency nearly overshadows his special day. Adam and Stacey wed.
139	11	"There Last Night"	Raymond Quint	David Boutland	22 April 1997
Tom becomes personally involved in the lives of a Vietnam veteran and his son, with tragic consequences.
140	12	"Gold"	Chris Langman	Ysabelle Dean	29 April 1997
Maggie and P.J, in one of Blue Heelers' most popular episodes, find themselves trapped underground in a collapsed mineshaft and find themselves thinking, 'Will we make it out alive?'
141	13	"Fool's Gold"	Gary Conway	Tony Morphett	6 May 1997
The question of whether Maggie and P.J will make it out alive plagues Mount Thomas.
142	14	"Grave Matters"	Kevin Carlin	David Allen	13 May 1997
Tom struggles with confronting relationships from the past, present, and future when the headstone of late wife, Nell, is vandalised.
143	15	"Loose Cannons"	Steve Mann	David Marsh	20 May 1997
Tom and Nick fall out when a professional shooter attempts to reconcile with his wife leads to a violent confrontation.
144	16	"Lean on Me"	Gary Conway	Kathie Armstrong	27 May 1997
Amphetamines are being home-made in Mount Thomas – with tragic consequences.
145	17	"Random Breath"	Chris Langman	Susan Hore	3 June 1997
Dash is accused of illegally waving her new boyfriend through a breath test station and finds herself in hot water with the new inspector.
146	18	"Close Encounters"	Kevin Carlin	Stephen Measday	10 June 1997
A baby disappears in suspicious circumstances, but only Adam believes the mother's story.
147	19	"Buckley's Chance"	Steve Mann	Rick Held	17 June 1997
An Oz Lotto ticket goes missing and Adam's wife suffers a miscarriage. Adam finds out that the baby wasn't his.
148	20	"No Means No"	Raymond Quint	Michael Winter	24 June 1997
Nick goes out on a limb to help an ex-prostitute rape victim, while Maggie and P.J suspect her of being an obsessed admirer. Inspector Monica Draper arrives to investigate complaints against Nick.
149	21	"Poetic Justice"	Fiona Banks	Bill Garner	1 July 1997
P.J finds himself dealing with an innocent feral, a Russian barber, and a truckload of cigarettes
150	22	"Left in Trust"	Kevin Carlin	Beverley Evans	8 July 1997
Maggie befriends a Polish woman who is looking for her missing exchange student daughter.
151	23	"Sick Puppy"	Steve Mann	Peter Dick	15 July 1997
Tom's daughter heads into mortal danger when she befriends a suspected murderer.
152	24	"Sisterly Love"	Fiona Banks	Jenny Lewis	22 July 1997
When P.J and Maggie can't agree over a spate of serial burglaries, lives are put in danger. Meanwhile, P.J investigates the school where Susan, Tom's daughter is working as a relief teacher.
153	25	"Can't Take a Joke"	Grant Brown	Roger Dunn	29 July 1997
Adam's career is at risk after a violent confrontation caused by the return of Stacey's old boyfriend.
154	26	"Every Contact Leaves Its Trace"	Graham Thorburn	Cassandra Carter	5 August 1997
A bungled suicide or attempted murder? As Adam Cooper lies near death in hospital, Dash sets out to solve the mystery.
155	27	"Playing Games"	Chris Langman	David Allen	12 August 1997
A Murder Mystery Weekend reveals more than anyone bargained for when a property development is vandalised, Chris' life is threatened, and Maggie and P.J confront the passion that promises to draw them together.
156	28	"Counting Chickens"	Fiona Banks	John Banas	19 August 1997
Nick and Dash find that a dispute over a chicken farm inheritance leads to more than broken eggs.
157	29	"Drag Line"	Grant Brown	Tony Morphett	26 August 1997
Bert Cole is campaigning for a youth curfew in Mount Thomas, until he is found dead-wearing women's clothing.
158	30	"Closing Ranks"	Steve Mann	Rick Held	2 September 1997
Nick and Zoe are held hostage at the hospital by a bereaved father after a baby dies under suspicious circumstances.
159	31	"Off the Air"	Peter Sharp	David Marsh	9 September 1997
Tom is forced to step in when a talkback radio announcer creates hysteria over a supposed crime wave.
160	32	"The Scarecrow"	Russell Burton	David Boutland	16 September 1997
When Maggie makes an enemy of an infamous local farmer, Dash's nightmares are realised. Maggie's brother, Robbie, returns.
161	33	"Safe as Houses"	Richard Sarell	Craig Wilkins	23 September 1997
Dash thinks her sympathy may have been misplaced after she organises assistance for friends evicted from their farm by the bank.
162	34	"Our Patch"	Fiona Banks	Anthony Ellis	30 September 1997
Tom looks like he is going soft when he protects a bunch of drunken louts harassing Chris at the pub.
163	35	"The All Seeing Eye"	Raymond Quint	Cassandra Carter	7 October 1997
Maggie and P.J. solve a two-year-old kidnapping case – with a little help from a witch and a gypsy. Maggie discovers her brother, Robbie, is still using drugs.
164	36	"Playing Possum"	Russel Burton	David Allen and Judith Colquoun	14 October 1997
When Maggie helps her brother Robbie kick his heroin addiction, her work and relationships suffer. Could Maggie really be shifting evidence? She calls her father Pat for help.
165	37	"Collateral Damage"	Karl Steinberg	Bill Garner	21 October 1997
The Heelers attempts to bust the drug trade in Mount Thomas are complicated.
166	38	"The Big Picture"	Richard Sarell	Russell Winter	28 October 1997
P.J. is determined to prove that Maggie has not been leaking information to drug dealers.
167	39	"Settlement Postponed"	Richard Jasek	Tony Morphett	4 November 1997
The Heelers are on the trail of an illegal SP bookie and Nick feels responsible when the main suspect goes missing.
168	40	"Containing the Rage"	Karl Steinberg	Paul Davies	11 November 1997
Dash realises a friend of hers has an anger management problem and this is a girl with a past and with a truck load of secrets.
169	41	"The Civil Dead"	Raymond Quint	Susan Hore	18 November 1997
P.J's past comes back to haunt him when Luke Darcy's trial is deferred and he ends up back on the street.
170	42	"Possession"	Russell Burton	David Boutland	25 November 1997
Maggie is tempted to suppress evidence that Robbie was involved in the theft of some paintings and she and P.J finally get together. Maggie makes the heartbreaking choice to turn her brother in.

== DVD release ==
The Complete Fourth Season: Part 1
Set Details	Special Features
23 Episodes (1035 Mins.); 6-Disc Set; Episodes 97 – 119; Full Frame; English (Dolby Digital 2.0 Stereo)	Slipcase Packaging; Photo Gallery (17 Pics)
Release Dates	Slipcase Packaging; Photo Gallery (17 Pics)
Australia	Slipcase Packaging; Photo Gallery (17 Pics)
6 April 2006	Slipcase Packaging; Photo Gallery (17 Pics)

The Complete Fourth Season: Part 2
Set Details	Special Features
20 Episodes (900 Mins.); Episodes 120 – 139; 5-Disc Set; Full Frame; English (Dolby Digital 2.0 Stereo)	Slipcase Packaging; Photo Gallery
Release Dates	Slipcase Packaging; Photo Gallery
Australia	Slipcase Packaging; Photo Gallery
6 April 2006	Slipcase Packaging; Photo Gallery

The Complete Fourth Season
Set Details	Special Features
43 Episodes (1935 Mins.); 11-Disc Set; Episodes 97 – 139; Full Frame; English (Dolby Digital 2.0 Stereo)	Slipcase Packaging; Photo Gallery
Release Dates	Slipcase Packaging; Photo Gallery
Australia	Slipcase Packaging; Photo Gallery
6 April 2006	Slipcase Packaging; Photo Gallery
