= Blue Heelers season 3 =

Blue Heelers
- Season 3
- No. of episodes: 42

Release
- Original network: Seven Network
- Original release: 12 February – 26 November 1996

Season chronology
- ← Previous; Season 2 Next → Season 4

The third season of the Australian police-drama Blue Heelers premiered on the Seven Network on 12 February 1996 and aired on Monday nights, and later, Tuesday nights, at 8:30 PM. The 42-episode season concluded 26 November 1996. All main cast members from the previous season returned. Tasma Walton was introduced in episode 107 as Dash McKinley.

== Casting ==
With Grant Bowler's exit from the show, Ann Burbrook also returned to Blue Heelers to temporarily reprise her role as Roz Patterson.

=== Main ===
- John Wood as Sergeant Tom Croydon
- Julie Nihill as Christine "Chris" Riley
- Martin Sacks as Senior Detective Patrick Joseph "P.J." Hasham
- Lisa McCune as Constable Margaret "Maggie" Doyle
- William McInnes as Senior Constable Nicholas 'Nick' Schultz
- Grant Bowler as Constable Wayne Patterson
- Damian Walshe-Howling as Constable Adam Cooper
- Tasma Walton as Probationary Constable Deirdre "Dash" McKinley

=== Recurring ===
- Peta Doodson as Senior Sergeant Monica Draper
- Beth Buchanan as Susan Croydon
- Michael Isaacs as Clancy Freeman
- Axl Taylor as Len the barman
- Dennis Miller as Ex-Sergeant Pat Doyle
- Nick Waters as Inspector Ted Faulkner
- Helen Trenos as Celia Donald
- Stuart Baker as "Richo"
- Reg Evans as Keith Purvis
- Terry Gill as Chief Superintendent Clive Adamson
- Karen Davitt as Dr. Zoe Hamilton
- Rachel Blakely as Gina Belfanti
- Beverley Evans as Harriet Keppel
- Alexandra Sangster as Anna Croydon
- Don Bridges as Charlie Clarke
- Marie Trevor as Lelia Clegg
- Pauline Terry-Bietz as Beth McKinley
- Frankie J. Holden as Senior Detective Jack Woodley
- Jack Finsterer as Detective Constable Johnny Kowalski

=== Guest stars ===
- Frances O'Connor
- Marg Downey
- Lee Kernaghan
- Radha Mitchell
- Terry Gill
- Raelee Hill
- Louise Siversen
- Rhys Muldoon
- David Wenham
- Norman Yemm
- Andrew Blackman
- Anne Phelan
- Annie Jones
- Asher Keddie
- Andrew McKaige

== Episodes ==
No. overall	No. in season	Title	Directed by	Written by	Australian air date
87	1	"Once Only Withdrawal (1)"	Riccardo Pellizzeri	Tony Morphett	12 February 1996
The Mt Thomas district is engulfed by bushfires and the police are being kept busy. Maggie and Wayne encounter an armed robber while trying to keep a local farmer up to date with the situation. After taking the offender to the station he injures himself and must be taken to the mostly closed local hospital. While Wayne is guarding the operating theatre, the offenders accomplices take the entire hospital, including Wayne Patterson as their hostages.
88	2	"Once Only Withdrawal (2)"	Gary Conway	Tony Morphett	12 February 1996
The team desperately try to bring a safe end to the hospital siege, but with fires blocking access to the town, they have no way of getting any back-up.
89	3	"Second Innings"	Richard Jasek	Howard Griffiths	13 February 1996
It is time for the annual cricket clash, between the Imperial Hotel and the Federal Hotel. Meanwhile the captain of the Imperial's side has most of the stock stolen from his butcher's shop. Is it an inside job? The Heelers investigate, while also preparing to play.
90	4	"Spider Man"	Chris Martin-Jones	Ysabelle Dean	20 February 1996
The body of a small girl is found in a farmer's dam. Investigations quickly lead the police to a suspect but without enough evidence they are forced to release him. After losing their tail on him, another young girl goes missing. They have to find the missing girl before it is too late.
91	5	"Day of Reckoning"	Richard Sarell	Susan Hore	27 February 1996
The coronial inquest into the death in custody of Vincent Platt begins and it appears that Nick is not showing any interest in defending himself. So the rest of the station get to work to find the evidence to clear his name.
92	6	"Sex and Death"	Kevin Carlin	Michaeley O'Brien	5 March 1996
Adam fights for his life after a drag-racing incident. During the subsequent investigation the Heelers find out that Adam has been keeping quite a few secrets from them.
93	7	"Not in my Backyard"	Chris Martin-Jones	Cassandra Carter	12 March 1996
Feelings run high when a prison is proposed in Mount Thomas.
94	8	"All Part of the Service"	Richard Sarell	Dave Worthington	19 March 1996
Tom creates a monster and has to deal with explosive consequences.
95	9	"Dog Days"	Richard Jasek	David Allen	26 March 1996
Mount Thomas is out hunting for a phantom sheep killer, while Wayne plays the field at home.
96	10	"An Act of Random Violence"	Chris Langman	Peter Gawler	2 April 1996
The Heelers are on alert after Joe Kenny escapes from prison. This is especially problematic for Wayne as he previously had an affair with Joe's wife. Meanwhile Wayne proposes to Gabe Greenway, his latest love interest, but with news about Joe and the reason for his interest in Wayne, she starts to question whether Wayne Patterson is a man she wants her children to know. Final appearance of Constable Wayne Patterson
97	11	"Unfinished Business"	Steve Mann	Peter Dick	9 April 1996
Roz returns to town for Wayne's funeral, much to Nick's dismay and the aftermath of Wayne's death sees each officer coming to terms with their grief and at the same time out to clear his name.
98	12	"Happy Families"	Gary Conway	John Wood	16 April 1996
PJ investigates a local suspected drug dealer. Maggie's brothers and father arrive to celebrate her 25th birthday. Heroin from PJ's investigation goes missing from the station, and the only people who could be responsible are the station full of police. During a dawn raid of the drug dealer's house, PJ, Maggie, Adam and Maggie's dad Pat make a terrible discovery. Meanwhile, after 5 long years, Tom's eldest daughter Anna shows up, with a surprise grandchild on the way.
99	13	"Priorities"	Karl Steinberg	Fred Clarke	23 April 1996
The Mount Thomas staff are understaffed and overworked, the computers are down, Inspector Faulkner turns up, a stolen car with a baby still in it, and the station finally boils over, with devastating and near tragic consequences for a young man who considers committing suicide.
100	14	"A Fair Crack of the Whip (1)"	Chris Langman	Tony Morphett	30 April 1996
Wayne's replacement finally arrives: Detective Jack Woodley. The team investigates a local string of robberies and the town is flooded with people performing in and attending the annual rodeo. Tom deals with his daughter Anna's pregnancy.
101	15	"A Fair Crack of the Whip (2)"	Steve Mann	Annie Beach	7 May 1996
The investigation into the assault of an elderly woman causes P.J. to suffer a crisis of confidence.
102	16	"Under Pressure"	Gary Conway	Margaret Plum	14 May 1996
The Heelers investigate a dispute between two sheep shearers. As soon as it appears that the dispute is settled, one of the shearers is found dead in a bale of wool. PJ leaves the murder investigation for Jack to deal with and instead investigates a case of alcohol contamination at the Pub.
103	17	"Fight Dirty"	Karl Steinberg	David Boutland	21 May 1996
Maggie is set to prosecute the Dean Crocker Case but P.J. has doubts about the credibility of evidence supplied by his new partner, Jack Woodley. With the case only hours away, P.J. must find new evidence to ensure a conviction while simultaneously proving why Jack's evidence is tainted.
104	18	"Art of Deception"	Chris Langman	David Allen	28 May 1996
The Mount Thomas Festival of the Arts causes headaches for Tom and Chris. Nick attempts to break down the fence between two feuding neighbors and P.J. is trying to find the source behind the influx in beatings that appear to be drug-related.
105	19	"Old Sins, Long Shadows"	Steve Mann	Jennifer Rowe	4 June 1996
Maggie discovers a homicide on the sly and Adam deals with a complaint from a high school principal about pornography
106	20	"In Unity Is Strength"	Richard Sarell	Dave Worthington	11 June 1996
Adam is upset after he and Nick discover the dead body of a teenager who has died from alcohol abuse. Chris' dismissal of a cellarman results in a strike at the Imperial
107	21	"The Kremin Factor"	Richard jasek	Peter Gawler	18 June 1996
A young woman arrives in town claiming to be the same girl that went missing 18 years earlier. Everybody had come to accept that the girl had died, except for her mother. It is now up to the Heelers to get to the bottom of what happened 18 years earlier, and to prove the true identity of the woman. Deirdre 'Dash' McKinley arrives for her first day, much to Adam's pleasure and Tom's annoyance. First appearance of Constable Deirdre McKinley
108	22	"Shelter from the Storm"	Chris Langman	Cassandra Carter	25 June 1996
Nick and Maggie witness a car drive into a dam. The driver is Rachel Freeman, the elderly mother of local disabled man Clancy. The investigation leads Nick to suspect an attempted suicide and things take another turn after Mrs Freeman is rushed to Hospital after taking an overdose of pain medication. Meanwhile Tom must find somewhere for Clancy stay and Dash must deal with her own prejudices.
109	23	"Principle of the Thing"	Richard Sarell	John Banas	2 July 1996
As the Heelers necessarily become involved with the high school, Tom realises his own problems are nothing in comparison to the school principal's.
110	24	"Mind Games"	Kevin Carlin	Susan Hore	9 July 1996
A childhood friend of Anna Croydon's recovers painful long forgotten memories and accuses her father, a local G.P. of molesting her as a child. P.J. and Maggie have to examine the events of the past as the victim continues to remember more details.
111	25	"Duty of Care"	Richard Jasek	Peter Dick	16 July 1996
Dash and Nick are called to an old farmhouse, where they discover a vandalised room, a terrified child, and a lamb hanging from the light fitting.
112	26	"Other People's Lives"	Chris Langman	John Banas	6 August 1996
P.J. and Maggie investigate the death of a young ballet dancer but P.J. is upset by Maggie's pas de deux with her varsity tutor.
113	27	"A Gift From God"	Kevin Carlin	Tony Morphett	13 August 1996
A paraplegic farmer is found battered and Tom suspects a water diviner; however, little does he know that the stranger is the father of Anna's baby, who has been traveling the countryside searching for them.
114	28	"Waiting to Happen"	Richard Sarell	David Phillips	20 August 1996
Nick is surprised by Dash's unprofessional behaviour at the scene of an accident until he learns that both the victims were friends of hers. Dash insists she can cope but Nick feels that there is more to it. P.J. investigates Roman, Maggies Tutor-turned-boyfriend, and discovers that he is married.
115	29	"Bewitched"	Richard Jasek	Cassandra Carter	27 August 1996
The Heelers are led into the world of witchcraft after a local woman is victimised by a local pastor. Things take a turn for the worse when that same pastor's teenage daughter is found dead in mysterious circumstances. P.J. and Maggie must investigate together.
116	30	"Mud Sticks"	Steve Mann	David Boutland	3 September 1996
P.J. has gone on leave and a new detective arrives to temporarily take his place: Detective Constable Johnny Kowalski. Tom places Baby Sam into a child care center but that same center becomes the target of rumours and gossip after a small girl is found to have bruises. Dash is quite taken by Johnny but soon realises he is not quite the gentleman that she thought he may have been.
117	31	"The Angel's Share"	Kevin Carlin	John Banas	10 September 1996
Maggie and Johnny investigate after thousands of liters of wine are stolen from a family owned winery. Johnny does not miss the chance of wooing Maggie, regardless of whether or not Maggie is interested.
118	32	"Something for Nothing"	Raymond Quint	David Allen	17 September 1996
The team investigate a burglary from a local woman the night before her garage sale. Dash is desperate to raise enough funds to buy the car she wants so Adam loans her the money. Chris installs Poker machines at the Imperial Hotel.
119	33	"Winner Takes All"	Gary Conway	Ysabelle Dean	24 September 1996
A horse endurance race presents problems for the Heelers with both a thief and a saboteur on the loose and Dash and Maggie can't escape Johnny Kowalski's womanising.
120	34	"I Spy"	Karl Steinberg	Susan Hore	1 October 1996
PJ returns from leave but before he can settle back in, he takes a phone call from a 3 year old child who can't wake up his mother and doesn't know where he lives. The race is on to find out where they are and who beat up the child's mother, before he comes back to finish the job.
121	35	"Reality Bytes"	Steve Mann	Dave Worthington	8 October 1996
A series of break-ins occur, the perpetrator is caught but is found to be working on a tip off from a computer generated phone call. Meanwhile Dash and Adam damage the station computer while playing on-line video games at night. To avoid trouble with Tom, they get the computer fixed outside official channels which results in the station computer acting strangely.
122	36	"In The Gun (1)"	Kevin Carlin	Tony Morphett	15 October 1996
The Darcy family causes trouble for the Heelers, ending in a fatal police shooting.
123	37	"In The Gun (2)"	Raymond Quint	Michael Winter	22 October 1996
The aftermath of the shooting looks to bring one of the Heelers down.
124	38	"Buck Naked"	Gary Conway	Dave Marsh	29 October 1996
Dash uncovers the truth about her brothers fiancée.
125	39	"Friendly Fire"	Steve Mann	Cassandra Carter	5 November 1996
An old friend of Nick's is in town, running an adult adventure camp in the hills. It all goes wrong when a city law firm is on the camp for a bonding exercise and their boss is shot with something more sinister than a paintball.
126	40	"Half a Second"	Graham Thorburn	Anthony Ellis	12 November 1996
The coronial inquest into the fatal shooting of Raelene Darcy begins. Meanwhile, to make things worse for PJ, new evidence comes to light regarding the first case he investigated in Mt Thomas, the new evidence suggests that the wrong man went to jail so Maggie sets out to clear PJ's name.
127	41	"Miss Mount Thomas"	Kevin Carlin	Beverley Evans	19 November 1996
The favourite in the Miss Mount Thomas contest claims she is being stalked and then mysteriously disappears
128	42	"Dead or Alive"	Steve Mann	David Allen	26 November 1996
Dash's mother needs an urgent kidney transplant, then when a donor kidney becomes available, it must be transported quickly but the car transporting the precious organ is stolen from outside the hospital. A desperate search begins for the car and the kidney, but will the police find it in time? Also a wanted fugitive is found living with his girlfriend in Mt Thomas.

== DVD release ==
The Complete Third Season: Part 1
Set details	Special features
22 Episodes (990 mins.); Episodes 55 – 76; 6-Disc Set; Full Frame; English (Dolby Digital 2.0 Stereo)	Slipcase Packaging; Photo Gallery (10 Pics)
Release dates	Slipcase Packaging; Photo Gallery (10 Pics)
Australia	Slipcase Packaging; Photo Gallery (10 Pics)
16 February 2006	Slipcase Packaging; Photo Gallery (10 Pics)

The Complete Third Season: Part 2
Set details	Special features
20 Episodes (900 mins.); Episodes 77 – 96; 5-Disc Set; Full Frame; English (Dolby Digital 2.0 Stereo)	Slipcase Packaging; Photo Gallery
Release dates	Slipcase Packaging; Photo Gallery
Australia	Slipcase Packaging; Photo Gallery
16 February 2006	Slipcase Packaging; Photo Gallery

The Complete Third Season
Set details	Special features
42 Episodes (1890 mins.); Episodes 55 – 96; 11-Disc Set; Full Frame; English (Dolby Digital 2.0 Stereo)	Slipcase Packaging; Photo Gallery
Release dates	Slipcase Packaging; Photo Gallery
Australia	Slipcase Packaging; Photo Gallery
16 February 2006	Slipcase Packaging; Photo Gallery
