= Blue Heelers season 1 =

Blue Heelers
- Season 1
- No. of episodes: 45

Release
- Original network: Seven Network
- Original release: 18 January – 22 November 1994

Season chronology
- Next → Season 2

The first season of the Australian police-drama Blue Heelers premiered on the Seven Network on 18 January 1994 and aired on Tuesday nights at 7:30 PM. The 45-episode season concluded on 22 November 1994. It had an average rating of 2.5 million and going to 3.5 million at its peak.

Its main cast included John Wood, Julie Nihill, Martin Sacks. Lisa McCune, William McInnes, Grant Bowler, Ann Burbrook, and Damian Walshe-Howling.

== Casting ==
Ann Burbrook was originally cast as Maggie Doyle and Lisa McCune as Roz Patterson but the two swapped roles to avoid being typecast in the future. William McInnes was originally cast as PJ Hasham and Martin Sacks as Nick Schultz but the two swapped roles because McInnes "looked more like a Schultz". Roz was written out of the show before season's end, because the producers thought that they could do more with another police character, rather than a civilian. This allowed for the introduction of Adam Cooper to the group.

=== Main ===
- John Wood as Sergeant Tom Croydon
- Julie Nihill as Christine 'Chris' Riley
- Martin Sacks as Detective Senior Constable Patrick Joseph 'P.J.' Hasham
- Lisa McCune as Constable Margaret 'Maggie' Doyle
- William McInnes as Senior Constable Nicholas 'Nick' Schultz
- Grant Bowler as Constable Wayne Patterson
- Ann Burbrook as Roz Patterson
- Damian Walshe-Howling as Probationary Constable Adam Cooper

=== Recurring ===
- Peta Doodson as Sergeant Monica Draper
- Beth Buchanan as Susan Croydon
- Michael Isaacs as Clancy Freeman
- Suzi Dougherty as Dr. Mel Carter
- Axl Taylor as Len the barman
- Dennis Miller as Ex-Sergeant Pat Doyle
- Nick Waters as Acting Inspector → Inspector Ted Faulkner
- Helen Trenos as Celia Donald
- Dale Stevens as Senior Constable Rose Egan
- Jennifer Botica as Detective Senior Constable Hilary Edmunds

=== Guest ===
- Radha Mitchell as Sally-Anne
- Gerard Kennedy as John Eagan,
- Brett Swain as Peter Sutcliffe
- Kate Keltie as Sally Lamont
- Peter Hosking as Frank Davis
- Anne Phelan as Mrs. Brady
- Petra Jared as Kim Stewart
- Charles 'Bud' Tingwell as Hayes
- Lois Collinder as Mrs. Rivers
- Raelee Hill as Jill Lambert
- Libby Tanner as Heather
- Lois Ramsay as Eileen Heart
- Ian Smith as Clive Burton
- David Wenham as William Cassidy
- Rex Hunt as Ben Murphy
- Janet Andrewartha as Bridget Ryan
- Peter Mochrie as Col
- Tony Briggs as Tony Dixon

== Plot ==
At the start of the season, we meet young city constable, Maggie Doyle, who is arriving at her posting in the small country town of Mount Thomas. At Mount Thomas police station we also meet the officer in charge, Sergeant Tom Croydon, who runs "his" station with an almost grandfatherly watch over his co-workers. We also meet Constable Wayne Patterson, who we find had a short romance with Maggie while they attended the Victoria Police Academy together; much to Maggie's surprise, he is now married to Roz Patterson. We also meet Senior Constable Nicholas 'Nick' Schultz, a sarcastic and yet good-hearted cop, and Senior Detective Patrick Joseph "P.J." Hasham, a charismatic and somewhat chauvinistic detective who soon found himself very interested in Maggie. At the local pub, The Imperial, we meet Chris Riley, a local woman who knows all the ins-and-outs of Mount Thomas.

During the season, we see Roz assisting the Heelers and later getting a job at the station as the administration officer. We also see the extent of Roz and Wayne's marriage problems which, when brought to a head when Roz witnesses a shooting over the telephone, results in the end of their marriage and Roz leaving Mount Thomas and returning to her home in Melbourne. This marriage dissolution is a result of many pressures which Roz and Wayne are placed under as a result of Wayne's dangerous job. This includes his being shot and left for dead by two criminals and Roz's somewhat intense jealousy for Maggie. Roz's absence opens up a place for ambitious and contentious young cop, Constable Adam Cooper, whose "breaking-in" at Mount Thomas is anything but smooth, particularly with Wayne who develops quite a disdain for him. Keeping with the theme of family problems, we see how Tom's family problems, including problems with his two daughters, develop. These are only made worse with the death of Tom's wife, Nell, as a result of a car accident. Tom, as a superior police officer, has to learn to deal to separate his personal and professional lives. He is increasingly finding it harder and harder when he has to deal with his friends and family when it is them that have committed offences. PJ has to deal with an old flame, Hilary Edmunds, when she arrives in town as part of the livestock squad, investigating farming issues in Mount Thomas. Maggie also finds romance in Mount Thomas with a shifty detective, Sean Neale, and she has trust issues when she discovers that her beloved boyfriend may, in fact, be a criminal. Maggie also discovers she has relationship problems with her father, Sergeant Pat Doyle. It is also revealed that Nick is carrying a huge secret: his wife and daughter, as well as half of his family, were killed in a car crash. This is revealed to be the reason Nick joined highway patrol and the reason for his stance against vehicle offences such as speeding and drink driving.

== Reception ==
The show quickly had an average Rating of 2.5 Million and going to 3.5 million at its peak.

The writers and Southern Star didn't expect the show to go anywhere but it quickly amassed to being a #1 Hit series for a number of years up unto 2003-2004 where the drama shows were beginning to fall down in ratings because the CSI franchise became more popular than drama shows since 2001, which caused the cancellation of the show in 2006. The show had 510 episodes out of the thirteen seasons and 12 years since it aired.

== Episodes ==
No. overall	No. in season	Title	Directed by	Written by	Australian air date
1	1	"A Woman's Place"	Mark Callan	Tony Morphett	18 January 1994
Maggie Doyle, the new cop in town, convinces a local girl to press rape charges against her violent boyfriend. First Appearances of Sergeant Tom Croydon, Christine Riley, Detective Senior Constable Patrick Joseph Hasham, Constable Margaret Doyle, Senior Constable Nicholas Schultz, Constable Wayne Patterson and Roz Patterson
2	2	"Doing It Tough"	Gary Conway	Peter Kinloch	25 January 1994
Wayne experiences his first autopsy, and Tom is forced to press charges against a friend's daughter.
3	3	"Why Give People Rights?"	Paul Moloney	John Upton	1 February 1994
Maggie and PJ lock horns when a local activist is shot dead.
4	4	"Wives"	Judith John-Story	Anne Brooksbank	8 February 1994
Roz gives PJ information leading to the arrest of a client's husband and a retired cop looks set to become a permanent thorn in Tom's side.
5	5	"Waiting for Apples"	Alister Smart	Graeme Koetsveld	15 February 1994
An annual racing event brings an array of colourful characters to Mount Thomas.
6	6	"Apprehended Violence"	Gary Conway	Greg Haddrick; Tony Morphett	22 February 1994
The discovery of an abandoned child raises painful memories for Nick.
7	7	"Life After Death"	Paul Moloney	Ted Roberts	1 March 1994
Seventeen-year-old Clare Brady is involved in a fatal car accident.
8	8	"Domino Effect"	Judith John-Story	Tony Morphett	8 March 1994
Shock waves surge through Mount Thomas when Wayne is shot by a couple of criminals.
9	9	"Diary Entry"	Julian McSwiney	Tony Morphett	15 March 1994
Wayne returns to work after the shooting, and a local drug dealer is exposed.
10	10	"Visions Splendid"	Gary Conway	John Upton	22 March 1994
Maggie and Wayne investigate the harassment of an elderly lady, and Roz lands a job at the station.
11	11	"Abandoned"	Paul Moloney	Anne Brooksbank	26 March 1994
A baby is found abandoned in Mount Thomas and causes more trouble than imagined.
12	12	"Damaged Goods"	Judith John-Story	Howard Griffiths	5 April 1994
The wife of a solicitor is arrested for shoplifting, and Tom risks his reputation to help a friend.
13	13	"Armed and Dangerous"	Steve Mann	Peter Kinloch	15 April 1994
A spate of armed robberies brings the Special Response Squad to Mount Thomas.
14	14	"Reunion"	Gary Conway	Tony Morphett	19 April 1994
Chris is shocked to find her supposedly dead ex-husband very much alive.
15	15	"Family Ties"	Alister Smart	Ysabelle Dean	26 April 1994
The fate of a small boy hangs in the balance due to a maze of untruths.
16	16	"Theft"	Chris Langman	Anne Brooksbank	3 May 1994
Wayne is accused of theft, and his future at the station hangs in the balance.
17	17	"Meat is Hung, Men are Hanged"	Steve Mann	Everett De Roche	10 May 1994
The return of a convicted child killer could have grave consequences for Mount Thomas.
18	18	"Conduct Unbecoming"	Gary Conway	Ray Harding	17 May 1994
PJ meets his match when an old flame comes to town to solve a cattle duffing problem.
19	19	"Good Cop, Bad Cop"	Alister Smart	Tony Morphett	24 May 1994
The Blue Heelers are worried that Tom may be transferred back to Melbourne.
20	20	"The Final Season"	Chris Adshead	Tim Gooding	31 May 1994
Wayne's hero comes to Mount Thomas and finds it hard to live up to his reputation.
21	21	"Payback"	Steve Mann	Judith Colquhoun	7 June 1994
Nick is destined to lose another relationship when his girlfriend knocks down someone and is accused of attempted murder.
22	22	"Sex, Lies and Videotapes"	Gary Conway	Patrick Edgworth	14 June 1994
Tom's mate Charles Turner embezzles $10,000 from the football club's funds.
23	23	"Men in Her Life"	Riccardo Pellizzeri	Tony Morphett	21 June 1994
When Maggie's reputation is on the line, her father comes to Mount Thomas to help sort it out.
24	24	"A Bird in the Hand"	Richard Sarell	Ysabelle Dean	28 June 1994
The team discovers an animal smuggling scheme going on in Mount Thomas.
25	25	"Missing"	Steve Mann	Anne Brooksbank	5 July 1994
Bill Mason follows up leads to the disappearance of his son, Paul, four years earlier.
26	26	"Day in Court"	Mark Piper	Justin Glockerla; Stephen Measday	12 July 1994
Maggie has her first day in court presenting evidence, and she's got butterflies.
27	27	"Nowhere to Run"	Riccardo Pellizzeri	Susan Hore	19 July 1994
A young girl is found dead, and her housemates are suspected of involvement.
28	28	"Consequences"	Richard Sarell	John Upton	26 July 1994
Inspector Faulkner investigates a local man who is selling inferior carcasses as quality meat.
29	29	"A Matter of Trust"	Steve Mann	Anne Brooksbank	2 August 1994
Roz is personally involved in a domestic case.
30	30	"Necessary Force"	Mark Piper	Tony Morphett	9 August 1994
Roz hears a shooting over the telephone and Wayne's marriage breaks down when Roz leaves to go back to Melbourne. Final regular appearance of Roz Patterson
31	31	"Bitter Harvest"	Riccardo Pellizzeri	Justin Glockerla; Alan Hopgood	16 August 1994
When a rape occurs in Mount Thomas, PJ thinks he knows who the culprit is.
32	32	"Crazy Like a Fox"	Alister Smart	John Lord; Tony Morphett	23 August 1994
A brother and sister feuding, an antique store owner is accused of receiving stolen goods, and Nick is offered a bribe while on duty.
33	33	"Old Dogs, New Tricks"	Steve Mann	Rachel Lewis	30 August 1994
Some strange things are going on at an old people's home and lead to an unexpected culprit.
34	34	"Labour of Love"	Mark Piper	Ysabelle Dean	6 September 1994
Wayne Patterson and the new recruit, Adam Cooper, have a personality clash. First Appearance of Constable Adam Cooper
35	35	"Escape Route"	Chris Martin-Jones	Judith Colquhoun	13 September 1994
A car crash victim turns out to be a battered wife. Adam falls for Maggie.
36	36	"Adverse Possession"	Riccardo Pellizzeri	John Coulter; Justin Glockerla	20 September 1994
A farmer stands to lose his land due to an ancient law.
37	37	"The Folly of Youth"	Steve Mann	Susan Hore	27 September 1994
Two missing girls cause suspicion to be placed in an unfair direction when looking for suspects.
38	38	"Face Value"	Mark Piper	Hugh Stuckey	4 October 1994
A car accident involving a priest puzzles the team.
39	39	"Suspicion"	Chris Martin-Jones	Anne Brooksbank	11 October 1994
A drug raid goes wrong, and suspicion is rife among the Heelers as to whose fault it was.
40	40	"Without Intent"	Riccardo Pellizzeri	Peter Gawler	18 October 1994
A carpet shop is ram-raided, and a body goes missing from a funeral parlour during a B & S ball.
41	41	"Family Matters"	Steve Mann	David Allen	25 October 1994
An overzealous young security guard's accusations lead to a much more interesting suspect than first thought, and a young girl comes into the station highly distressed.
42	42	"The First Stone"	Mark Piper	Tony Morphett	1 November 1994
Nick is involved in a murder investigation that could spell the end of his career.
43	43	"Skin Deep"	Chris Martin-Jones	Ysabelle Dean	8 November 1994
A stabbing proves hard for the Heelers to handle when racism becomes involved.
44	44	"Luck of the Draw"	Riccardo Pellizzeri	Cassandra Carter	15 November 1994
Tom's wife, Nell, is killed in a car accident.
45	45	"Damage Control"	Gary Conway	Judith Colquhoun; Michaeley O'Brien	22 November 1994
Maggie's boyfriend is suspected of being on the take when a horse racing ring is discovered.

== DVD release ==
The Complete First Season
Set Details	Special Features
Episodes 1–17; 17 Episodes (765 Mins.); Episodes 1–17; 6-Disc Set; Full Frame; English (Dolby Digital 2.0 Stereo)	Slipcase Packaging; Photo Gallery 24 Pics (On Disc 1)
Release Dates	Slipcase Packaging; Photo Gallery 24 Pics (On Disc 1)
Australia	Slipcase Packaging; Photo Gallery 24 Pics (On Disc 1)
2 November 2005	Slipcase Packaging; Photo Gallery 24 Pics (On Disc 1)
