= List of awards and nominations received by Blue Heelers =

Blue Heelers awards and nominations
Awards and nominations
| Award | Wins | Nominations |
| Australian Film Institute Television Awards | 3 | 7 |
| Australian Screen Editors Awards | 0 | 1 |
| AWGIE Awards | 1 | 3 |
| Logie Awards | 26 | 68 |
| People's Choice Awards | 3 | 11 |

Totals (Note: Certain award groups do not simply award one winner. They acknowledge several different recipients, have runners-up, and have third place. Since this is a specific recognition and is different from losing an award, runner-up mentions are considered wins in this award tally. For simplification and to avoid errors, each award in this list has been presumed to have had a prior nomination.)
- Wins: 33
- Nominations: 89

The following is a list of all awards which the Australian drama, Blue Heelers, has won or been nominated for.

== Awards and nominations ==
List of awards and nominations received by Blue Heelers
| Award | Year (Note: The year listed refers to that in which the award ceremony took place.) | Category | Nominee(s) | Result | Ref(s). |
|---|---|---|---|---|---|
| Australian Film Institute Television Awards | 1998 | Best Episode in a Television Drama Series | "Collateral Damage" (producer Riccardo Pellizzeri) | Nominated | |
| Australian Film Institute Television Awards | 2001 | Best Performance by an Actor in a Guest Role in a Television Drama Series | Gary Day for "The Poisoned Fruit Part 2" | Won | |
| Australian Film Institute Television Awards | 2001 | Best Performance by an Actress in a Guest Role in a Television Drama Series | Carol Burns for "Deadly Fascination" | Nominated | |
| Australian Film Institute Television Awards | 2005 | Best Television Drama Series | Blue Heelers series 12 (producers Gus Howard and David Clarke) | Nominated | |
| Australian Film Institute Television Awards | 2006 | Best Guest or Supporting Actor in a Television Drama | Marcus Graham for "Moonlighting" | Won | |
| Australian Film Institute Television Awards | 2006 | Best Guest or Supporting Actress in a Television Drama | Saskia Burmeister for "Facing the Music" | Won | |
| Australian Film Institute Television Awards | 2006 | Best Television Drama Series | Blue Heelers series 13 (producers Gus Howard and David Clarke) | Nominated | |
| Australian Screen Editors Awards | 2006 | Best Editing in a Television Drama | Nathan Wild | Nominated | |
| AWGIE Awards | 1997 | Television – Series | John Banas for "Reports of Damage and Loss" | Won | |
| AWGIE Awards | 2002 | Television – Series | Tony Morphett for "Letting Go" | Nominated | |
| AWGIE Awards | 2005 | Television – Series | Michaeley O'Brien for "Crash Site" | Nominated | |
| Logie Awards | 1995 | Most Popular Actor | John Wood | Nominated | |
| Logie Awards | 1995 | Most Popular Actress | Lisa McCune | Nominated | |
| Logie Awards | 1995 | Most Popular New Talent | Lisa McCune | Won | |
| Logie Awards | 1995 | Most Popular Series | Blue Heelers | Nominated | |
| Logie Awards | 1996 | Most Popular Personality on Australian Television (Gold Logie) | Lisa McCune | Nominated | |
| Logie Awards | 1996 | Most Popular Actor | Martin Sacks | Nominated | |
| Logie Awards | 1996 | Most Popular Actor | John Wood | Nominated | |
| Logie Awards | 1996 | Most Popular Actress | Lisa McCune | Won | |
| Logie Awards | 1996 | Most Popular Series | Blue Heelers | Nominated | |
| Logie Awards | 1997 | Most Popular Personality on Australian Television | Lisa McCune | Won | |
| Logie Awards | 1997 | Most Popular Personality on Australian Television | John Wood | Nominated | |
| Logie Awards | 1997 | Most Popular Actor | Martin Sacks | Won | |
| Logie Awards | 1997 | Most Popular Actor | John Wood | Nominated | |
| Logie Awards | 1997 | Most Popular Actress | Lisa McCune | Won | |
| Logie Awards | 1997 | Most Popular New Talent | Tasma Walton | Won | |
| Logie Awards | 1997 | Most Popular Series | Blue Heelers | Won | |
| Logie Awards | 1998 | Most Popular Personality on Australian Television | Lisa McCune | Won | |
| Logie Awards | 1998 | Most Popular Personality on Australian Television | John Wood | Nominated | |
| Logie Awards | 1998 | Most Popular Actor | John Wood | Nominated | |
| Logie Awards | 1998 | Most Popular Actor | Martin Sacks | Won | |
| Logie Awards | 1998 | Most Popular Actress | Lisa McCune | Won | |
| Logie Awards | 1998 | Most Popular Programme | Blue Heelers | Won | |
| Logie Awards | 1998 | Most Outstanding Actor | William McInnes | Nominated | |
| Logie Awards | 1999 | Most Popular Personality on Australian Television | Lisa McCune | Won | |
| Logie Awards | 1999 | Most Popular Personality on Australian Television | John Wood | Nominated | |
| Logie Awards | 1999 | Most Popular Actor | John Wood | Nominated | |
| Logie Awards | 1999 | Most Popular Actor | Martin Sacks | Won | |
| Logie Awards | 1999 | Most Popular Actress | Lisa McCune | Won | |
| Logie Awards | 1999 | Most Popular Programme | Blue Heelers | Won | |
| Logie Awards | 1999 | Most Popular New Male Talent | Paul Bishop | Nominated | |
| Logie Awards | 1999 | Most Outstanding Drama Series | Blue Heelers | Won | |
| Logie Awards | 2000 | Most Popular Personality on Australian Television | Lisa McCune | Won | |
| Logie Awards | 2000 | Most Popular Personality on Australian Television | John Wood | Nominated | |
| Logie Awards | 2000 | Most Popular Actor | John Wood | Nominated | |
| Logie Awards | 2000 | Most Popular Actor | Martin Sacks | Won | |
| Logie Awards | 2000 | Most Popular Actress | Lisa McCune | Won | |
| Logie Awards | 2000 | Most Popular Programme | Blue Heelers | Won | |
| Logie Awards | 2000 | Most Popular New Female Talent | Jane Allsop | Won | |
| Logie Awards | 2001 | Most Popular Personality on Australian Television | Lisa McCune | Nominated | |
| Logie Awards | 2001 | Most Popular Personality on Australian Television | John Wood | Nominated | |
| Logie Awards | 2001 | Most Popular Actor | John Wood | Nominated | |
| Logie Awards | 2001 | Most Popular Actor | Martin Sacks | Won | |
| Logie Awards | 2001 | Most Popular Programme | Blue Heelers | Nominated | |
| Logie Awards | 2001 | Most Popular New Female Talent | Caroline Craig | Nominated | |
| Logie Awards | 2002 | Most Popular Personality on Australian Television | John Wood | Nominated | |
| Logie Awards | 2002 | Most Popular Actor | John Wood | Nominated | |
| Logie Awards | 2002 | Most Popular Programme | Blue Heelers | Nominated | |
| Logie Awards | 2002 | Most Popular New Male Talent | Ditch Davey | Won | |
| Logie Awards | 2003 | Most Popular Personality on Australian Television | John Wood | Nominated | |
| Logie Awards | 2003 | Most Popular Actor | John Wood | Nominated | |
| Logie Awards | 2003 | Most Popular Australian Programme | Blue Heelers | Nominated | |
| Logie Awards | 2004 | Most Popular Personality on Australian Television | John Wood | Nominated | |
| Logie Awards | 2004 | Most Popular Australian Programme | Blue Heelers | Nominated | |
| Logie Awards | 2004 | Most Popular Australian Drama Series | Blue Heelers | Nominated | |
| Logie Awards | 2005 | Most Popular Personality on Australian Television | John Wood | Nominated | |
| Logie Awards | 2005 | Most Popular Programme | Blue Heelers | Nominated | |
| Logie Awards | 2005 | Most Popular Actor | John Wood | Won | |
| Logie Awards | 2005 | Most Popular Actress | Jane Allsop | Nominated | |
| Logie Awards | 2005 | Most Popular New Female Talent | Rachel Gordon | Nominated | |
| Logie Awards | 2005 | Most Popular Australian Drama Series | Blue Heelers | Nominated | |
| Logie Awards | 2005 | Most Popular New Female Talent | Samantha Tolj | Nominated | |
| Logie Awards | 2006 | Most Popular Personality on Australian Television | John Wood | Won | |
| Logie Awards | 2006 | Most Popular Actor | John Wood | Won | |
| Logie Awards | 2006 | Most Popular Australian Drama Series | Blue Heelers | Nominated | |
| Logie Awards | 2006 | Most Outstanding Actor in a Drama Series | John Wood | Nominated | |
| Logie Awards | 2007 | Most Popular Personality on Australian Television | John Wood | Nominated | |
| Logie Awards | 2007 | Most Popular Actor | John Wood | Nominated | |
| Logie Awards | 2007 | Most Popular Australian Drama Series | Blue Heelers | Nominated | |
| People's Choice Awards | 1998 | Favourite Actor in a Drama or Serial | Martin Sacks | Nominated | |
| People's Choice Awards | 1998 | Favourite Actor in a Drama or Serial | John Wood | Nominated | |
| People's Choice Awards | 1998 | Favourite Actress in a Drama or Serial | Lisa McCune | Won | |
| People's Choice Awards | 1998 | Favourite TV Drama or Serial | Blue Heelers | Won | |
| People's Choice Awards | 1998 | Favourite TV Star | Lisa McCune | Won | |
| People's Choice Awards | 1999 | Favourite Actor in a Drama or Serial | William McInnes | Nominated | |
| People's Choice Awards | 1999 | Favourite Actor in a Drama or Serial | Martin Sacks | Nominated | |
| People's Choice Awards | 1999 | Favourite Actor in a Drama or Serial | John Wood | Nominated | |
| People's Choice Awards | 1999 | Favourite Actress in a Drama or Serial | Lisa McCune | Nominated | |
| People's Choice Awards | 1999 | Favourite TV Drama or Serial | Blue Heelers | Nominated | |
| People's Choice Awards | 1999 | Favourite TV Star | Lisa McCune | Nominated | |
