= Nick Schultz =

Nick Schultz may refer to:

- Nick Schultz (ice hockey) (born 1982), Canadian former professional ice hockey player
- Nick Schultz (cyclist) (born 1994), Australian professional road racing cyclist
- Nick Schultz (Blue Heelers), fictional character from the Australian television series Blue Heelers
- Nick Schultz (politician) (born 1988), American politician
