= Adam Cooper =

Adam Cooper may refer to:

- Adam Cooper (Blue Heelers), fictional character
- Adam Cooper (dancer) (born 1971), actor, choreographer, dancer and theater director, formerly of the Royal Ballet

== See also ==
- Adam Ashley-Cooper (born 1984), Australian rugby union player
