= Chris Riley (Blue Heelers) =

- Blue Heelers character
- Julie Nihill as Chris Riley
- First appearance: "A Woman's Place" (Ep. #1); 18 January 1994
- Last appearance: "One Day More" (Ep. #510); 4 June 2006
- Created by: Hal McElroy and Tony Morphett
- Portrayed by: Julie Nihill

In-universe information
- Full name: Christine Bridget Riley
- Occupation: Publican; Shire councillor
- Spouse: Terry Kennedy (div.)
- Religion: Roman Catholic

Councillor Christine Bridget "Chris" Riley is a fictional character in the long-running Australian police drama Blue Heelers, portrayed by Julie Nihill. The publican and landlady of the Imperial Hotel in Mount Thomas, Chris is in a unique position to assist the police thanks to her wealth of knowledge about the town and its inhabitants. Strong-willed and opinionated, she often serves a spokeswoman for important issues in the community, and eventually gains election to the local shire council. She is one of two characters, along with Tom Croydon, to appear in all thirteen seasons of the show, appearing in 507 of the 510 episodes to air.

== Development and casting ==
The character of Chris Riley was created by Hal McElroy and Tony Morphett to be the publican and landlady of the Imperial Hotel, the Mount Thomas watering hole favoured by the town's police force. Her early characterisation is that of a helpful, friendly woman who is fiercely loyal to her friends, with a fiery temper to boot. During the early development of the show, McElroy conceived the rule that the producers of the show "couldn't have a camera in a room unless there was a copper there as well", with this rule extended to include the only two non-police members of the main cast, that being Chris Riley and Roz Patterson.

Julie Nihill came to the role after playing the role of Jessie Bradman in Bodyline and guest roles in hit television shows such as Sons and Daughters, A Country Practice and Rafferty's Rules.

In later years, Chris is portrayed as a shire councillor, which allows the character to take on a more significant role in the community, moving her away from simply being a friendly ear and occasional informant for the police.

== Character background ==
Chris Riley is the Irish Australian daughter of a publican who was born and raised at the Imperial Hotel in Mount Thomas, the local pub owned by her father and frequented by the police. Her oldest friend in town is Tom Croydon, a friend from school who has gone on to become the sergeant of the local police station. At some point prior to the start of the series, she married Terry Kennedy, a shearer who did his national service in the same unit as Tom. Although Chris admitted to finding him beautiful, Terry was less than dependable and he walked out on the marriage some ten years before the first season.

== Role on Blue Heelers ==
As the landlady of the Imperial Hotel, Chris Riley is a friend and confidante to many members of the local police station who frequent her pub, both during and outside of work hours. When she is first introduced, she provided lodgings for Maggie Doyle (Lisa McCune), the new constable in town, and helped her to play a prank on her new colleagues, Nick Schultz (William McInnes) and P. J. Hasham (Martin Sacks), on her first night in town. Later that night, Chris asked Maggie for help when local girl Sally-Anne shows up at the pub claiming she was raped. As the case progresses, she did her best to offer Sally-Anne support, giving the suspect an earful when he tried to drink in her bar.

Just before Anzac Day in 1994, Tom arrived at the pub after closing time and informed Chris that her ex-husband, Terry Kennedy, had been killed in a car accident, and she is needed to perform the identification because his face is unrecognisable from his injuries. After identifying him from his distinctive tattoo, she returned to the pub to find Terry (Ivar Kants) climbing through her bedroom window. Despite her misgivings, she originally agreed not to tell the police of the mistaken identification and the two reconciled. This changes rapidly with the news that despite the fact they had never got an official divorce, Terry had gone on to marry another woman, thus committing bigamy.

Although she is normally more than happy to help the local police, Chris was reluctant to testify as the key witness in a court case after the suspect's wife arrived in town and told her a sob story with her child in hand. When the police prosecutor subpoenaed her, forcing her to testify, she deliberately gave vague testimony which led to the suspects acquittal. The failure of this case, and Chris's part in it, briefly drove a wedge in her relationships with both P. J. and Tom.

During mid 1995, Chris found herself held hostage in her own pub along with Adam Cooper (Damian Walshe-Howling) when a local man escaped from a prison van and held them both at gunpoint. The assailant, Dean Shipley, demanded to see his former football coach, Tom Croydon, who entered the bar without a bullet-proof vest and was shot non-fatally after Dean was spooked by a noise from outside. After getting drunk in an effort to cope with the trauma of being held hostage and seeing her best friend shot, Chris shared a kiss with Adam, and the pair ultimately began a short-lived sexual relationship.

Midway through the fourth season, Chris's temper found her in hot water when she summarily dismissed a barman who was suspected of dealing alcohol to minors on the sly. Her assumption of his guilt, and her unwillingness to let the man state his case leads to her entire staff going on strike. As the strike wore on, she tried to do everything herself, but when a delivery driver chose to support the strike and not make an important delivery of alcohol, the threat of financial ruin finally forced her to the negotiation table.

By early 1997, the news that Chris is planning to marry Irish immigrant Sean O'Malley draws mixed reactions from her friends and family. Tom cautions her that she might just be rushing things, but she waves off his concerns. Later, when Sean turns up dead in a graveyard from shotgun wounds, Chris learns that her fiancé wasn't the man she thought he was, and that his past in Ireland had finally caught up to him.

The following year, Chris found evidence of a mysterious fifty-year old cold case in the journal of a local woman, hidden behind a wall in the Imperial's cellar. Although she was initially enthusiastic about the case, she quickly began butting heads with the police once it became clear that the chief suspect is a local spinster and friend of hers. Although the evidence is seemingly against them, Tom's friendship with Chris keeps him from going through with charging the suspect, and the police ultimately uncover another suspect.

Later that year, Chris had come to the conclusion that her business was in trouble. The building was old, the plumbing still wasn't fixed, and she wasn't making as much profit as she had hoped. This made her an easy mark for a travelling fraudster with plans to demolish the Imperial and replace it with a shopping mall. Luckily for her, the police were able to find evidence of the fraud and put an end to the scheme before it was too late.

In early 1999, Chris decided to run for election as a member of the local shire council. When a couple of local kids were killed in a fiery car crash, her campaign manager used the opportunity to push a platform for youth issues and government spending. The media coverage was less than flattering, playing Chris as dragging in the victim's mother to score votes. Unfortunately, there was no time to clear up the issue, and her election was left in doubt thanks to voter backlash. Ultimately, though, she avoided most of the backlash, won the election and took her seat on the council.

Shortly after being elected, Chris expressed her concerns about a proposal for an abattoir to be built down by the river, but she was shouted down by her constituents. Regardless of any environmental concerns, the townspeople were far more interested in the jobs that the proposal would create, and it looks like someone will stop at nothing to silence her when the Imperial's beer delivery is destroyed by a dangerous driving stunt and she found herself in hospital after being accidentally poisoned.

In early 2004, Chris found herself up for re-election to the council against a local Muslim woman, Deniz Gulmez (Natasha Pincus). An ugly incident where one of the Chris's male bar-workers donned a burqa and sneaked into a female-only pool session sparked a fierce political battle between the two women. As racial tensions ran high, Deniz pointed the finger at her opponent after her meal at the pub is laced with peanuts, which she is highly allergic too. Ultimately, however, the two women found that they agreed on many issues, and Deniz withdrew from the election to act as Chris's campaign manager.

Later that year, Chris was confronted with the past when her ex-husband, Terry (now played by Frankie J. Holden), showed up in the pub cellar while an ex-lover, Dan Woodley, was found hiding in a crawlspace behind the guests' shower. Dan is wanted in Queensland in relation to an armed robbery, but when Joss Peroni (Danny Raco) returned to arrest him, Chris claimed he has left. Joss later returned with Tom, who warned her that she was at risk of being charged as an accessory, and was all set to have her hauled off in handcuffs when Dan turned himself in. While the police waited for an extradition request, Chris begged Tom to listen to Dan's story, a story that firmly pointed the finger at Terry. Even after Terry was found with the robbery weapon and proceeds, Tom refused to release Dan, leading to Chris angrily calling him out for having changed for the worse.

In 2005, Chris found herself facing bankruptcy after she surprised a late night intruder in the bar. In the ensuing struggle, she was left with a badly cut hand while the female intruder was in a coma from a blow to the head. Although Tom wants the matter cleared up quickly, Detective Amy Fox (Rachel Gordon) can see inconsistencies in the story and keeps investigating. Against Tom's protests, Chris is arrested for assault, and she faced the prospect of losing her liquor licence if she were formally charged. Without a licence, it would only be a matter of time before going bankrupt.

In an effort to clear her name, Evan Jones (Ditch Davey) asked Chris to walk him through what happened that night, and he came to suspect that there were two intruders. With this information in hand, Evan and Amy investigated the intruder's boyfriend, who confessed to the attempted burglary. They were able to prove that Chris acted in self-defence, which would be enough to save her liquor licence. By the time she received the news, however, she had already sold the pub. With the pub under new ownership, Chris settled herself into her new job as the pub's manager, initially with a strict new dress code, at least until she put her foot down with her new bosses.

== Relationships ==
=== Romance ===
Chris Riley has been married once:

- Terry Kennedy (Ivar Kants, later Frankie J. Holden) is Chris's ex-husband. She met Kennedy when she was working in her father's pub, the Imperial Hotel, when Kennedy walked in with a group of shearing mates. Chris was infatuated with him and they married a short time later. About ten years prior to the start of the series, Kennedy walked out of her life, seemingly for good, and only ever returned to ask for a loan.

Prior to the start of the series, Chris had a romantic liaison with Dan Woodley (Greg Parker), who she called the "man she should have married". During the second season, she also had a brief relationship with Adam Cooper, which ended when Adam realised Chris didn't share his feelings. During the fourth season, she was engaged to Sean O'Malley, an Irish immigrant who had fled from The Troubles to Australia. The engagement ends when Sean is killed by his own son for deserting his IRA roots.

=== Family ===
Very little is known of Chris's immediate family apart from the fact that her father was the publican of the Imperial Hotel and left the pub in his daughter's ownership. During the first four seasons, she is shown to have several cousins, with Gail Jackson (Margaret Mills) and her daughter Jade (Breeanna Obst) appearing in the second season. Dominic Riley (Robin Dene) and his daughter Leonie (Rainey Mayo) appear several times starting from the fourth season.

=== Friends and colleagues ===
Chris is depicted as a long-time resident of Mount Thomas, and so she is shown to be friends with a number of local personalities. Her most significant friendship is the one she shares with Tom Croydon (John Wood), the town's senior-most police officer. Having been friends since they were children, Chris often acts as a shoulder for Tom to lean on, and likewise he does the same for her. After Tom's wife is killed in the first season, there were occasional hints of a potential mutual attraction, but this was never expanded upon. Despite their close friendship, Tom's position as a police officer sometimes led to friction between the friends when they came down on opposite sides of the law.

With Chris being the publican of the "watering hole" for the local police, she has made friends with most of the police officers who join the Mount Thomas Police, taking on a maternal role with many of them and her pub is frequently the first home for new constables when they first arrive in town. Among these officers, she was probably closest to Maggie Doyle (Lisa McCune), the first female constable to be posted to the town. Much like her friendship with their boss, however, their closeness didn't stop Chris from giving them a piece of her mind if she thought they were wrong.

Chris is also shown to be active in the community, not only as a councillor, but also as a member of, and frequent host of the Country Women's Association. Her position with the CWA gives her a close friendship with several of the town's older women, including local personalities like Leila Clegg and Winifred Starling.

As an employer, Chris has been shown to be demanding of her staff, leading her to have a sometimes acrimonious relationship with several of them, especially with her first chef, Jeannie. In one third season episode, she fires one of her barmen without giving him a chance to tell his side of the story after he is accused of selling alcohol to minors. This act leads to her entire staff going out on strike, and she is forced to apologise to them all when she is unable to even get her beer delivery through their picket line.

== Personality ==
As a publican in a country town, Chris Riley is portrayed as the kind of woman who knows everyone, and who everyone knows. If something is going on in town, there is a very good chance that she will have heard about it. If the police need the latest gossip, it is often Chris that they turn to, and she is normally more than willing to give them a helping hand. She isn't completely immune to sweet talking, however, and there are times where a smooth-talking criminal has convinced her not to help the authorities.

Despite dealing with her rough-and-tumble clientele on a daily basis, she has a maternal nature and often acts as a den mother for the town's cohort of young constables, offering them lodging in her pub, and a friendly ear if they need it. She hates being called "Mrs. Riley", and is known universally as Chris, or occasionally "Chrissy". She does have a redhead's temper, however, and she is more than willing to ban someone from her pub, or give them an earful if she feels they deserve it.

After her election to the shire council, Chris shows she is not afraid to take an unpopular decision if she thinks it is in the best interests of her constituents. Even when she is faced with an angry mob, or with the possibility she might've been poisoned, she has the tenacity to stick to her guns and find a way to work things out.

== Reception ==
Although Blue Heelers was not expected to become a popular programme, the show became a hit shortly after it began airing, with much of this success credited to the quality of the ensemble cast, including Julie Nihill as Chris Riley.
