= Police Files: Unlocked =

- Genre: Documentary
- Presented by: David Field (2007–2008); Ditch Davey (2006–2007)
- Country of origin: Australia
- Original language: English
- No. of series: 3

Production
- Running time: 30 minutes

Original release
- Network: Seven Network
- Release: 2006 – 2008

Police Files: Unlocked is an Australian television program that aired on the Seven Network, showcasing police videos from around the world in similar vein to World's Wildest Police Videos. The first two seasons of the program were hosted by former Blue Heelers star Ditch Davey. Repeats of the show and the third season features the narration of David Field, who also had a recurring guest role in Blue Heelers. Unlike Davey, Field did not appear on camera.

The program looks at police operations from Australia and around the world, featuring footage of high speed police pursuits, police stings and surveillance operations. At the end of each story, a summary of consequences the offender faces for their crime is revealed, and occasionally what the action would be if the offender was caught in Australia. The program claims that the vision is from actual police tapes.

The first-season finale of Police Files: Unlocked was broadcast on 29 November 2006 in a one-hour special episode. A second season aired in 2007, and a third season began airing in March 2008. It was axed in 2008.
