= Ditch Davey =

Australian actor

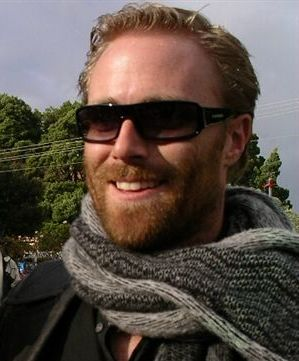
- Ditch Davey in 2006
- Born: 1974 or 1975 (age 50–51); Australia
- Occupation: Actor
- Years active: 1998–present
- Known for: Blue Heelers and Home and Away
- Spouse: Sophia Dunn (m. 2010) (separated)
- Children: 2
- Awards: Logie Award for Most Popular New Male Talent (2002)

Kristian "Ditch" Davey is an Australian actor known for his role as Evan Jones in the Seven Network's Blue Heelers from 2001 to 2006, and for playing the lead role of Julius Caesar in Netflix Season 2: Master of Rome Roman Empire in 2018.

== Early life and education ==
Davey graduated from the Western Australian Academy of Performing Arts (WAAPA), Perth in 1998.

== Career ==
Not long after leaving the WAAPA in 1998 and the state of Western Australia, Davey got his first acting job on a Wrigley's Eclipse chewing gum ad. Following this, he was seen on Australian dramas such as All Saints, Above the Law, and Water Rats. Following a small role in the Seven Network telemovie Do or Die, Davey attracted the attention of the Blue Heelers producers. He was soon cast as probationary constable Evan Jones and he made his first appearance in July 2001. In 2006, Blue Heelers was cancelled after twelve years.

Davey hosted Channel Seven's Police Files: Unlocked, before leaving to work on Sea Patrol. From 2008 until 2011, Davey played SAS officer Jim Roth on a semi-regular basis. He had a guest role in a 2010 episode of Wilfred. The following year, Davey played Detective Sergeant Mick Ritchie in Underbelly Files: Tell Them Lucifer was Here. He also portrayed Romeo in the 2012 Australian science-fiction film Crawlspace. He also had a supporting role in the final season of "Spartacus: War of the Damned". In 2014, Davey starred in the ABC-TV series Black Box, as Dr. Ian Bickman, chief neurosurgeon, opposite Kelly Reilly. In 2017, he joined the cast of the comedy-drama series 800 Words.

In 2018, he landed the lead role of Julius Caesar in Netflix Season 2: Master of Rome Roman Empire, alongside Jessica Green who played Cleopatra.

From September 2020, Davey began playing neurosurgeon Dr. Christian Green in the Seven Network soap opera Home and Away. Davey plays the role of Roger Levett in the Network 10/Paramount+ series Paper Dolls. On 4 June 2025, Davey was named in the extended cast for Stan series Gnomes.

On 4 March 2026, Davey was named in the cast for upcoming film Wolf Creek: Legacy.

== Personal life ==
Davey has been married to actress Sophia Dunn since 2010. They have two sons. In 2020, the family relocated to Sydney to accommodate Davey's filming commitments with Home and Away.

== Awards and nominations ==
In 2002, Davey won the Logie Award for Most Popular New Male Talent.

== Filmography ==
=== Film ===
Year	Title	Role	Notes
2007	Small Change	Mick	Short film
2008	Under a Red Moon	Stew	Feature film
2009	Blessed	Nathan	Feature film
2009	If at First You Don't Succeed	Andrew	Short film
2011	Closing In	Whelan	Short film
2012	Crawlspace	Romeo	Feature film
2013	We've All Been There	Matt	Short film
2013	Coping	Uncle Trevor	Short film
TBA	Wolf Creek: Legacy	TBA	Film

=== Television ===
Year	Title	Role	Notes
2000	Bondi Banquet	Dasher Rorschach	
2000	Water Rats	Brendan Hogan	Episodes: "Reunion" and "In the Blood"
2000	Above the Law	Chris Clark	Episodes: "A Hard Day's Night" and "By the Book"
2001	Do or Die	Slipper	Miniseries
2001–2006	Blue Heelers	Evan Jones	Series regular
2008	Satisfaction	Rosso	Episode: "Rubber Dubber"
2008–2011	Sea Patrol	Captain Jim Roth	Recurring role
2010	Wilfred	Clarance	Episode: "Dog Star"
2011	Underbelly Files: Tell Them Lucifer was Here	Det. Sgt. Mick Ritchie	TV movie
2012–2013	Spartacus: War of the Damned	Nemetes	
2014	Black Box	Dr. Ian Bickman	Series regular
2015	Texas Rising: The Lost Soldier	George Wilkerson	Miniseries
2016	The Doctor Blake Mysteries	Llewellyn Sullivan	Episode: "The Visible World"
2017	800 Words	Terry Turner	Season 2
2018	Roman Empire	Julius Caesar	Season 2: Master of Rome
2020–2021	Home and Away	Christian Green	Main cast
2022	Beyond the Dark	Nathan	1 episode
2023	Paper Dolls	Roger Levett	Main cast
2026	Gnomes	Brant Sanders	TV series
