= Wayne Patterson =

- Blue Heelers character
- First appearance: "A Women's Place"; 18 January 1994
- Last appearance: "An Act Of Random Violence"; 2 April 1996
- Portrayed by: Grant Bowler

In-universe information
- Occupation: Police constable
- Spouse: Roz Patterson
- Relatives: George Patterson (father); Helen Patterson (mother)

Wayne Patterson is a fictional character from the Australian police drama Blue Heelers, played by Grant Bowler. He made his first appearance in the pilot episode "A Women's Place", broadcast on 18 January 1994. He departed in the third season episode "An Act Of Random Violence" on 2 April 1996.

== Development ==
Wayne is one of the show's seven original main characters, who made his debut during the first episode. Blue Heelers marks Bowler's first television role. He graduated from NIDA in 1991 and appeared in various Shakespeare productions before he was cast as Wayne. He stated "Acting is as challenging as I hoped and I decided on a move into television to learn a new part of the business. I guess you could say I'm ambitious, but not in a materialistic sense. More about the work I do."

At the beginning of the series, Wayne is married to Roz Patterson (Ann Burbrook). They have a "steamy, tempestuous" marriage, which sees them fighting a lot, but they always make up. Burbrook described it as "daggers and then red roses", while Bowler thought it was a believable relationship and called it "very Nineties". He also said that as Wayne is often a scapegoat for many "klutzy things" that occur at the station and everyone is good at something, he wanted his character to be good at his marriage. When problems arise in the marriage, Roz considers leaving Wayne, until "a disaster" forces them to re-evaluate their lives.

The "disaster" occurs in the eighth episode when Wayne is shot while on duty. The scene was scripted to emphasise the danger young officers were facing every day in Australia. Bowler admitted that he was "terrified" when he had the prop gun pointed at his head during filming. He told Caron James of TV Week: "It really, really freaked me out. I was distinctly uncomfortable the first time the gun was pointed at me, despite the fact that the safety officer and the armoury officer had told me it was safe." Bowler also told James that he had grown up around guns and went shooting with his father when he was younger, but it was still "unnerving" to film the scene. Bowler explained that the plot is not a "shoot 'em up", Wayne does not see it coming and it is actually an unglamorous incident. Wayne's injury is serious and Roz keeps vigil by his bedside as he recovers.

== Storylines ==
Wayne is a young member of the Mount Thomas team. He attended the police academy with Maggie Doyle (Lisa McCune), where they dated for a while. After Maggie's mother died, she and Wayne lost touch and drifted apart until Maggie is posted in Mount Thomas, where she learns Wayne is married to Roz Patterson (Burbrook) and is staying in the police residence.

Wayne goes through a lot while at Mount Thomas including being shot and left for dead by the driver of a car he was about to help. He and Maggie were also taken hostage by dangerous criminals in the Mount Thomas hospital in the first season 3 episode "Once Only Withdrawal". He was held at gunpoint numerous times, been accused of corruption and drug offences and was also known in Mount Thomas as a bit of a "ladies man". He was part of the Traffic Operations Group at Mount Thomas and, later, became the District Firearms Officer.

Wayne's time as a Heeler was ended in the season 3 episode "An Act Of Random Violence" when he was struck by a car and killed right outside of the Mount Thomas Police Station, while running across to save a child, who was in the path of the oncoming car. Wayne's position was initially filled by senior detective Jack Woodley (Frankie J. Holden) who was later found charged with falsifying evidence. He was then replaced by Constable Dash McKinley (Tasma Walton). Wayne's wife Roz briefly returns for Wayne's funeral, much to Nick's dislike who suspects she only returned to receive his life insurance and police benefits.

== Reception ==
The character's departure episode was seen by 873,000 viewers, which was 223,000 more than the show's average audience figure. Simon Hughes of The Age criticised Wayne's exit storyline, writing "How sad that the writers could not rise to the occasion and provide him with something better than what can only be described as an ordinary death."
