= Adam Cooper (Blue Heelers) =

- Blue Heelers character
- First appearance: "Labour of Love"; 6 September 1994
- Last appearance: "One Day More"; 4 June 2006
- Portrayed by: Damian Walshe-Howling

In-universe information
- Occupation: Police constable
- Spouse: Stacey Norse

Adam Bryce Cooper is a fictional character from the Australian police drama series Blue Heelers, played by Damian Walshe-Howling. He made his debut in the first season episode "Labour of Love", broadcast on 6 June 1994. Adam is a police constable transferred to Mount Thomas as his first station straight from the police academy at age 19. He takes Roz Patterson's place when she is dismissed from her employment as the station's administration officer for accessing confidential police records. Adam is a bright spark of an officer with plenty of potential and plenty of questions. He is very young for a police officer and appears slightly immature at times though he has a good heart and a love for his job.

== Development ==
Adam is one of seven original main characters created for the series. Damian Walshe-Howling was in Indonesia for a five-week surfing and climbing holiday when he called his mother at home and learned that his agent had been trying to contact him. After speaking with his agent, Walshe-Howling learned that he was close to missing out on the auditions for Blue Heelers and if wanted to attend, he would need to cut his holiday short by a week. He did so and just "scraped" into the auditions on the last day. Following three callbacks, he learned that he had been cast as rookie constable Adam Cooper. He told Caron James of TV Week: "It was Friday afternoon, and I'd been waiting by the phone all day. Finally, my agent rang and said, 'Damo, break out the Bollinger!' I just screamed 'Yes!' I celebrated all weekend!" To prepare for the role, Walshe-Howling joined a squad for a day at the Victoria Police Academy in Melbourne, where he completed a 3.2km run and an assault course. He made his first appearance as Adam in the thirty-fourth episode of the series, which was broadcast on 6 September 1994.

Adam comes to Mount Thomas straight from the police academy. Walshe-Howling called his character "pretty cocky, and he's a bit of a smart —." He said Adam does not know his own boundaries yet and thinks he's "something special", so he feels he is ready to go out and "catch the crooks." Walshe-Howling later described Adam as "passionate and impulsive", and he thought that his ability to do "what comes naturally" was one of the character's strengths. When asked by a TV Week columnist what Adam had learned during his time at Mount Thomas, Walshe-Howling stated "It has been rewarding in some ways, but in other ways it has shattered a lot of his illusions about the way life is. I don't think he's as innocent as he used to be." Walshe-Howling was grateful to the producers for being open to the cast having a say in the direction of their character's storylines.

Walshe-Howling reprised the role for an appearance in the final episode, broadcast on 4 June 2006. Adam returns to Mount Thomas, which is facing closure, to "settle an old score."

== Storylines ==
Season 1 for Adam mainly focused on his introduction to and breaking-in at the station. The first time Adam appeared in the series, he was at the academy and Wayne Patterson had travelled there himself to complete further study. It was here that Adam and Wayne met and Wayne began to show his dislike towards Adam. Adam managed to say all the wrong things and act the wrong way which irritated Wayne. This finished in Adam and Wayne having a violent confrontation and Adam finally decided to leave him alone. When he arrived at the station, he was the newest officer there and appeared a little out-of-place with all the mature officers.

Early in Season 2, Adam was bitten by a bouncer (Terry Serio) who was HIV positive in an attempt to capture and arrest him. He was terrified at the prospect of dying at a young age, and thankfully his test results a few weeks later turned out to be negative for the condition. After a shaky start, Adam begun to fit in a little more at the station. He also started a physical relationship with Chris Riley, but the relationship ended in the season finale when he had intercourse with Gina Belfanti. Adam's brother visited him in the same episode, an argument took place after his older brother was accused of rape. Overall, Adam matured a little and started to fit in a lot more in Season 2.

As a valued member at Mount Thomas, Adam went through another steady year as a Heeler in Season 3. He played a key role in proving Nick Schultz innocent when he was accused of killing a man who was in custody. Drama came for Adam in "Sex and Death" when he crashed his car while drag racing, he faced being sacked but luckily Chief Superintendent Clive Adamson decided against it. He was good mates with Jack Woodley, who was posted at Mount Thomas for a few weeks before getting sacked for fixing evidence. Adam also formed a strong early bond with Dash McKinley, and Adam quickly became very fond of her. He saved Dash in a hostage situation in the season final, and drove Dash down to Melbourne to visit her sick mother in hospital.

Early in Season 4, Adam rolled the dice and admitted his feelings for Dash, but Dash told him that she didn't like him like "that". Adam met Stacey Norse in "Fowl Play" and after a short time dating the two decided to get married. The night before the wedding, Dash and Adam kissed, after the kiss, Adam revealed that Stacey was pregnant. But Adam and Dash put their now obvious feelings for each other aside and the marriage went through the very next day. Faced with financial difficulties, Adam and Stacey's marriage declined and it was revealed that Stacey was not pregnant with Adam's child, but an ex-boyfriends. When the ex-boyfriend came to town, Stacey created an evil plan to kill Adam and take off with her ex-lover and start a new life with Adam's insurance payout. The plan failed, and in a dramatic scene, a bed ridden Adam proved that she conspired to kill him. The rest of the season was quiet for Adam, but his relationship with Dash remained strong.

The downfall of Adam Cooper began about 3 episodes into Season 5. After his male friend Wazza tried to kiss him, Adam found himself in a difficult situation when he saw Wazza being bashed for being a homosexual. To avoid being labelled a "fag-lover", he did nothing to stop the beating in a cowardly fashion. About 12 episodes later, Adam came close to killing a boxer in a fight which was organised by himself. But the worst came from episode 201 onwards. Adam found new friends, who weren't exactly trustworthy and he became resentful towards Tom, who always seemed to pick at Adam over minor things. A few tension filled verbal conflicts resulted. In episode 206 "Mates Rates", Adam mistakenly purchased a stolen car. He soon found out that it was stolen, but to avoid any investigation he did not reveal the truth to his workmates. In "Rotten Apple", Adam comforted Dash who was facing the prospect of dying of cancer and the two had sex. A few days later, Adam's secret regarding his car was found out and Tom went to him to tell him what he had found out - Adam has a furious look on his face throughout the conversation and punched Tom at the end of it. The next day, Adam was dismissed by Tom, who agreed not to press assault charges after some persuasion from Chris. Adam responded with a simple "Thanks". He packed up his things as his disappointed colleagues stood and watched and he started crying just before he walked out for the last time. As he exited the station, he had one last glance at the car which cost him his career, and before he could go much further Dash came out to say one last goodbye and from this it was apparent that she was the only officer who still respected him. The pair shared a friendly moment before Adam walked away.

Adam reappeared in the last episode of Blue Heelers (Episode 510: One Day More). During this episode he came back to Mount Thomas saying that he wanted to make amends to the broken bridges, get on with his life and speak with Tom. As things turned out, he came back and attempted to frame Tom for selling an illegal weapon in Melbourne just after the old station was bombed. He came back as a photocopier technician and was, not to Tom’s knowledge, fixing the station’s photocopier. It was this job that gave him the access to the police computer where he stole information while everybody was occupied. This was found out and his room was searched revealing that he still had the illegal high-powered sawn-off shotgun. It was found out, also, that he was involved in a shooting and drug offence but, when he made allegations against Tom, Inspector Falcon-Price was more than happy to release him on bail. His accomplice, the shooter, was later brought in and released, along with Adam and he was forced to, in self-defence, kill this man with a metal bar when he made a move on him. The episode finished with Adam and Tom having a long talk and making amends and Adam dropping the allegations against Tom. Adam made a full confession to killing the shooter in self-defence.
