= List of Blue Heelers characters =

Blue Heelers is an Australian television police drama series that aired on the Seven Network from 18 January 1994 until 4 June 2006. The series depicted the lives and relationships of the residents of Mount Thomas, a fictional small town in Victoria, and its police force. The following is a list of all main, recurring/semi-regular cast members that appeared in the series.

== Main characters ==
=== Adam Cooper ===
Adam Cooper, played by Damian Walshe-Howling, made his first appearance on 6 September 1994.

=== Tom Croydon ===
Tom Croydon, played by John Wood, made his first appearance on 18 January 1994.

=== Maggie Doyle ===
Maggie Doyle, played by Lisa McCune, made her first appearance on 18 January 1994.

=== Amy Fox ===
Amy Fox, played by Rachel Gordon, made her first appearance on 17 July 2004. Amy entered the show in season 11 after the bombing of the Mount Thomas Police Station. She was billed as being "Early 30s, sweetly spoken, feminine but with a take-no-prisoners policing style." She is also "smart", but "desperate for love and approval after childhood tragedies." Amy is partnered with Senior Detective P. J. Hasham (Martin Sacks). At first, there is tension between the two but eventually they form a close friendship. Her parents died in a car accident when she was eight years old, and afterward she lived with her aunt and uncle. She happily lived with them for four years until her uncle started molesting and raping her when she was 12 years old. The abuse continued until her aunt kicked her out when she was 16. She confronted her uncle in season 12 of the show and told him that the reason her aunt kicked her out was because she became pregnant with his baby. Her aunt made her abort the baby before driving her to the train station and telling her never to come home. Her uncle then confesses to molesting her 15 years ago and is arrested. Amy continues to work with P.J until he joins a Cold Case Squad in Melbourne. She is later partnered with Evan Jones (Ditch Davey) when he becomes a detective.

=== Tess Gallagher ===
Tess Gallagher, played by Caroline Craig, made her first appearance on 24 May 2000.

=== Matt Graham ===
Matthew "Matt" Graham, played by Matthew Holmes, made his first appearance on 21 September 2005. Matt served in the Army, notably as part of the peace-keeping force in East Timor, and his time there has left some very deep scars. Before transferring to Mount Thomas, Matt has had some trouble at his previous postings, where it has been noted that he has a very black or white view of the world and of enforcing the law, plus some problems controlling his temper, something his colleagues struggle to deal with, and they initially find his attitude overly harsh, making it difficult for him to really make friends. Detective Amy Fox (Rachel Gordon) takes an immediate dislike to him and makes it her mission to go after him when Matt is accused of murdering a suspect. Even after he is exonerated of the crime she continues to distrust him and it is a long time before she can start to see that behind the hard exterior Matt might actually be a nice guy. When he is almost shot in a drugs raid gone wrong, a moment on vulnerability allows Amy to realise that the two of them may actually have a lot in common. Matt remains a loyal member of the team at Mount Thomas to the very end.

=== P. J. Hasham ===
P. J. Hasham, played by Martin Sacks, made his first appearance on 18 January 1994.

=== Mark Jacobs ===
Mark Jacobs, played by Geoff Morrell, made his first appearance on 14 July 2004. He was introduced after the bombing of the original Mt Thomas Police Station. He was billed as "Mid 40s career cop, steady, self-confident, calm, intellectual and ambitious." He is married to Penny and has a daughter, Freya (Bethany Fisher). Mark was appointed by Inspector Falcon-Price (Neil Pigot) who wanted him to be the replacement for Senior Sergeant Tom Croydon (John Wood). He left the force after the death of a boy under the influence of drugs and alcohol, whom he hit with a car causing an uproar in the town of Widjeree.

=== Evan Jones ===
Evan "Jonesy" Jones, played by Ditch Davey, made his first appearance on 18 July 2001. Jonesy was introduced into the show as a Probationary Constable who had joined the police force in his late twenties in order to avenge the death of his biological father, Sam Bridges. Soon after joining the Mt. Thomas Station he became a prime suspect in an investigation before later being cleared of all suspicion when Les Anderson, his biological father's former business partner and suspected killer was assaulted and left for dead. He was known to come from a strong policing family having his half brother, Detective Sergeant Dylan Jones and adoptive father Commander Reg Jones both in the police force. Jones was a rebellious and headstrong character, who was often criticised for his non-team oriented ways, 'Cowboy' nature and casual approach to both life and policing.

He also constantly found himself in trouble with senior officers from the moment he arrived in town, with Senior Sergeant Tom Croydon, strongly disapproving of Jones' motives for joining the force in the first place and continually questioned his choice of staying in the job, while he also had an unceremonious working relationship with his later Sergeant Ben Stewart, who Jonesy consistently butted heads with over both policing and personal matters. His aggressive 'bad cop' role when handling, and questioning suspects and his ability to attract trouble also saw him referred to as "Mad Dog Jones" by Inspector Falcon-Price. Later in the series he makes his way up to the rank of Senior Constable and after Senior Detective P.J. Hasham's departure in Season 12 he shows promise as a detective after working closely with Senior Detective Amy Fox and goes on to partner her after becoming a Detective Senior Constable following the completion of Detective training.

Jonesy's chaotic love life is a constant source of complication for the character throughout his time in the series. After he joins the station he soon develops a highly emotional yet ambiguous relationship with his Sergeant Tess Gallagher. She is however eventually so overwhelmed by her colleague's affection for her and her own feelings for him that she briefly succumbs to his advances when she finally acknowledges his feelings for her and the pair share a passionate encounter in the station’s locker room, Tess however panics and immediately tries to put a stop to any future romantic relationship with Jones by eloping to Fiji with Doctor Josh Carmichael. After the breakdown of Tess' ultimately doomed marriage her subsequent pregnancy with Josh's child leads to Jonesy wanting to help support Tess and he asks her to marry him, but his proposal is declined as she doesn’t want to jump into another rushed marriage and wants go through with the pregnancy independently. Later complications with Tess’ pregnancy then force her to leave Mt. Thomas, leading to an emotional goodbye to Jones. He later develops a relationship with Senior Constable, Susie Raynor and includes a marriage proposal, however, his hesitation in starting a romantic relationship led to her having two fleeting relationships with Sergeant Ben Stewart and Leading Senior Constable Alex Kirby, the revelation of the latter with Jonesy's best mate Kirby leads to their short lived engagement ending. It is seen in the final episode of the series that Jonesy and Susie have managed to repair part of their once close friendship with each other.

=== Alex Kirby ===
Alex Kirby, played by Charlie Clausen, made his first appearance on 23 February 2005. Originally a leading senior constable, Alex was promoted to acting sergeant towards the end of 2005. In the final episode of Season 12, Alex's son, Rory, (played by Louis Corbett) is introduced.

=== Jack Lawson ===
Jack Lawson, played by Rupert Reid, made his first appearance on 10 February 1999.

=== Dash McKinley ===
Dash McKinley, played by Tasma Walton, made her first appearance on 18 June 1996.

=== Kelly O'Rourke ===
Kelly O'Rourke, played by Samantha Tolj, made her first appearance on 21 July 2004. She came into the show after the bombing of the Mount Thomas Station. She was introduced as a probationary constable and billed as being "An energetic 21-year-old graduate from the Academy, enthusiastic and self-confident." Her father was a police constable and friends with Tom Croydon (John Wood), before he was killed in the line of duty when she was a child.

=== Jo Parrish ===
Jo Parrish, played by Jane Allsop, made her first appearance on 18 August 1999.

=== Roz Patterson ===
Roz Patterson (also McGregor), played by Ann Burbrook, made her first appearance on 18 January 1994. In the series, she is married to Wayne Patterson, one of the Mount Thomas Police constables. She arrives with him from the city and stays with him in the police residence. Roz is a very friendly and warm person and one who is very loyal to her friends. She may perhaps be a little naïve and gullible and may make some mistakes, but she has good intentions and a kind heart. Roz cleans the station as she was the wife of the watch-house keeper. She resented the job (mostly due to the police's unwritten rule that the watch-house keeper's wife was not only expected to clean the station, but also the cells and provide meals for those in the cells, all unpaid) and resented that she was forced to do this job and have little life of her own. She was always a city girl and liked to have friends around her and the comforts of life—not much of this in Mount Thomas, she thought.

After a failed attempt to run a beauty business out of the police residence where she put an ad in the local paper with the station number before Wayne could clear it with Tom Croydon, Roz purchased a car of her own, which she used for her new idea of a mobile beauty business. This was all going fine for her until she was pulled over by Nick, who gave her a ticket for doing 19 km/h over the speed limit. Roz had previously had many traffic infringements and, as a result, her license was suspended putting an end to her driving and the business. Roz was furious at Nick for this, with Roz giving both Wayne and Nick a hard time over it. Wayne tried to reason with Nick with no success. Nick later explained to Roz his reason's for not going easy on her, telling her that his wife and daughter had been killed by a drunk driver who was speeding which prompted him to join the traffic division.

She was then lucky enough to get a job as a clerical assistant at the Mount Thomas police station, and she enjoyed doing this. Working together put strain on Roz and Wayne's marriage but they made it work. After a while, though, it became too much for Roz to deal with. As part of the job, she had been exposed to all the terrible things that Wayne had to put up with, and was seeing all that Wayne never told her. These things scared her and she began to worry about Wayne more and more. Doing this job, Roz became very attached to some of the people she had to deal with. One particular women caught her eye and she began to feel sorry for this mother, who was trying to support her children, and working at a pub at the same time. When she wanted some information that Roz had access to, Roz felt obligated to get her this information, which could change her life for the better. Roz stole the information from the police computer, and was found out. Roz was dismissed from her job and returned to the boring old life she had before. The last straw for Roz finally came when, one night, Wayne received a call about a burglary out of town on an old farm. He left to attend but the complainant called back and started talking to Roz, who then heard a shooting over the telephone. She was terrified that Wayne had again been shot. This was too much for her. She decided to move back to the city to her parents' house and end the marriage, much to Wayne's dismay. Roz also appeared in Episode 97 (Unfinished Business) as a guest. This was the episode after Wayne’s final episode and she came to attend the funeral and tie up the loose ends.

=== Wayne Patterson ===
Wayne Patterson, played by Grant Bowler, made his first appearance on 18 January 1994.

=== Joss Peroni ===
Joss Peroni, played by Danny Raco, made his first appearance on 21 July 2004. Joss entered the show after the bombing of the original Mt Thomas Police Station and the death of Senior Constable Jo Parrish during Season 11. He is introduced as a probationary constable, and billed as being "an enthusiastic cowboy who loves catching bad guys and loves wearing a gun. A keen heterosexual with a desire to be seen as an Italian stallion." He is stopped for speeding by Evan Jones (Ditch Davey) and Susie Raynor (Simone McAullay). He trained at the Police Academy with Kelly O'Rourke (Samantha Tolj) and has a strong but friendly rivalry with her.

=== Susie Raynor ===
Susie Raynor, played by Simone McAullay, made her first appearance on 24 September 2003. The character was introduced as a replacement for Tess Gallagher (Caroline Craig). Upon her debut, Susie is married to Brad (Matt Passmore), a former policer officer who became a paraplegic after an accident on the job. Brad is later killed by Ben Stewart. Susie accidentally shot Ben in the arm during a burglary. Ben started to think it was revenge since he was the one who killed her husband. She and Ben later had a brief relationship, but Susie regretted it. Susie was shortly engaged to Evan Jones, but that ended because she had slept with Jonesy's best mate Alex Kirby. Susie was promoted to Senior Constable in early 2005. In late 2005 she was semi-promoted to Acting Sergeant under Snr. Sgt. Croydon's direction, but was later semi-demoted back to Senior Constable under the Inspector's orders, due to that Leading Senior Constable Kirby outranks her. The Acting Sergeant's position then got given to Kirby.

=== Chris Riley ===
Christine "Chris" Riley, played by Julie Nihill, made her first appearance on 18 January 1994.

=== Nick Schultz ===
Nicholas "Nick" Schultz, played by William McInnes, made his first appearance on 18 January 1994.

=== Ben Stewart ===
Benjamin "Ben" Stewart, played by Paul Bishop, made his first appearance on 26 August 1998.

== Recurring characters ==
=== A ===
==== Clive Adamson ====
Chief Superintendent Clive Adamson was a fictional character in the long-running Australian police drama Blue Heelers. He originally appeared in the show between 1995 and 1996 as the regional Chief Superintendent based in the fictional city of Evanleigh and was usually only seen in Mount Thomas in the aftermath of some major drama. As a chief superintendent, he outranked the Heelers and also the district inspector and thus was not the favourite person of Ted Faulkner. He was quite a large man and came across as grandfatherly but was also a forceful leader. After a break of five years, Adamson returned to the series after Inspector Falcon-Price was abducted.

Portrayed by Terry Gill, 1995 – 1996, 2001

==== Sophie Ash ====
Sophie Ash is a fictional character from Blue Heelers. She appeared in 2005 and 2006. She was a doctor at the Mount Thomas Hospital.

Portrayed by Stephanie Millar, 2005 – 2006

=== B ===
==== Gina Belfanti ====
Gina Belfanti was a fictional character in the long-running Australian police drama Blue Heelers. She was an ambulance officer in Mount Thomas and lived with Maggie. She joined the Heelers in 1995 and stayed until 1997 when she died in hospital during the opening episode of season 4 (it was revealed in the next episode that she died from Encephalitis). She had a one-night stand with Adam Cooper before being raped later that night. She also had a brief relationship with P.J Hasham, before realising he had feelings for Maggie.

Portrayed by Rachel Blakely, 1995 – 1997

=== C ===
==== Josh Carmichael ====
Doctor Josh Carmichael was a fictional character in the long-running Australian police drama Blue Heelers from 2002 until 2003.

Portrayed by Daniel Fredrikson, 2002 – 2003

==== Mel Carter ====
Mel Carter was a fictional character on Blue Heelers. She was a Doctor and replaced Jasmine Farrah. She was first introduced in season 6 episode 'Under Fire' (250). She first comes across as vicious and impatient, however this can be explained as she was under stressful situation as she was helping with the bus crash.

Portrayed by Suzi Dougherty, 1999 – 2002

==== Charlie Clarke ====
Charlie Clarke was a fictional character in the long-running Australian police drama Blue Heelers. He was Mount Thomas' plumber, but was quite slack when it came to plumbing itself. He quite often made work for the Heelers and was once suspected of the murder of his wife, Cheryl, who he refers to as 'the minister for war'. He lives out of town with his wife and his dog, Dylan, named after Bob Dylan.

Portrayed by Don Bridges, 1996 – 2003

==== Leila Clegg ====
Leila Clegg was a fictional character in the long-running Australian police drama Blue Heelers who could quite often be found at the Imperial Pub havin' a quick drink. She was quite old lady, who became quite good friends with Nick and "Tommy" and became involved with many police activities, one even taking part in a drug bust. She was portrayed by Marie Trevor who had also had a guest role in Blue Heelers before she started playing Leila in 1996.

Portrayed by Marie Trevor, 1996 – 2000

==== Ellis Corby ====
Ellis Corby was a fictional character in the long-running Australian police drama Blue Heelers. He was a lawyer in the series from 1995 to 2005. He was portrayed by Adam May who initially appeared in the series as an ambulance officer.

Portrayed by Adam May, 1997 – 2005

==== Marissa Craddock ====
Marissa Craddock was a fictional character who was in the Salvation army and was Marrying Ben. but that all ended when she found out Ben wasn't ready to be married nor having a relationship with her.

Portrayed by Heidi Arena, 2003 – 2004

==== Anna Croydon ====
Anna Croydon is a fictional character on the long-running series Blue Heelers. She first appeared in 1996 and was last seen in the 2006 series final. She has been married twice, the first time to an Indian man. While married to him, she had an affair with her current husband Brett Allcott. They have been married since 1996 and have two children, Sam and Daisy.

Portrayed by Alexandra Sangster, 1996, Kate Mulvany 2005–2006

==== Nell Croydon ====
Nell Croydon was a character in the Australian series Blue Heelers since it began in 1994 although she was never seen throughout the series, she was spoken about regularly. She was the wife of Mount Thomas' officer-in-charge, Tom Croydon. She died in the season one episode forty four tilted Luck of the Draw. Nell suffered a 'heart turn' at the wheel while driving back from Melbourne with her daughter Susan. As a result, her car drove onto the wrong side of the road just outside Mount Thomas and had a head-on collision with another car that left three teenagers dead and Susan in hospital. She also appeared in season six episode 'Starry Starry Night' as a figment of Tom's imagination.

Portrayed by Leigh Morgan, 1994

==== Susan Croydon ====
Susan Croydon was a fictional character in the long-running Australian police drama Blue Heelers. She was Tom Croydon's daughter and we see her first in the first series when she is involved in the fatal car accident that killed Nell Croydon, her mother and Tom Croydon's wife. She eventually becomes a teacher, but not before she battles with the education department for her career, trying to prove to them that she no longer has anything to do with drugs.

Portrayed by Beth Buchanan, 1994 – 2004

==== Daniel Curtis ====
Daniel Curtis was a fictional character in the long-running Australian police drama Blue Heelers from 2001 until 2004. Daniel was the elder of Tom's two stepsons in his marriage to Grace Curtis.

Portrayed by Kane McNay, 2001 – 2003

Portrayed by Abe Forsythe, 2004

==== Grace Curtis ====
Grace Curtis, played by Debra Lawrance, appeared on a recurring basis between 2001 and 2004. She was introduced as a love interest for Tom Croydon (John Wood). In 2004, she was raped and murdered by the Baxters, who also blew up the Mount Thomas station.

==== Nelson Curtis ====
Nelson Curtis was a fictional character in Blue Heelers from 2001 until 2004. He was the younger of Tom's two stepsons, after he married Grace Curtis.

Portrayed by Darcy Bonser, 2001 – 2004

=== D ===
==== Paul Donald ====
Detective Sergeant Paul Donald was a fictional character in the long-running Australian police drama Blue Heelers first portrayed by Marcus Eyre. Det Sgt Donald was a member of the Homicide Squad, he first appeared on Blue Heelers in 1999. Donald was involved in the investigation of Senior Constable Maggie Doyle's murder where he believed P.J was the murderer. Donald normally appeared on the show to work on a big case. In the show he was portrayed as a homosexual.

Portrayed by Marcus Eyre, 1996 – 2004

==== Celia Donald ====
Celia Donald was a fictional character in the long-running Australian police drama Blue Heelers first portrayed by Helen Trenos. She was a real-estate agent in the series from 1994 to 1997 and was a very sophisticated and confident woman and was always trying to talk someone into buying something. Celia was heavily involved in many different Mount Thomas organisations, such as the local Racing club. She was portrayed by Suzy Cato in 2000 and 2001 for a number of episodes. Through her connections, Celia usually knew about big happenings in Mt Thomas, such as a proposed psychiatric gaol, before anyone else in town does, even the Heelers. And she was never shy about spreading her information around the town, which usually stirred up trouble.

Portrayed by Helen Trenos, 1994 – 1997 and Suzy Cato, 2000 – 2001

==== Sally Downie ====
Sally Downie was a fictional character in the long-running Australian police drama Blue Heelers. She was a lawyer in the series from 1998 to 1999 and was portrayed by Catherine Wilkin. During Season 5 (1998) of the series, Sally and Tom embark on a relationship which lasts a number of episodes until they realise, coppers and lawyers don't mix.

Portrayed by Catherine Wilkin, 1998 – 1999

==== Mick Doyle ====
Mick Doyle was a recurring character in the long-running Australian police drama Blue Heelers. A member of the Ethical Standards Division (E.S.D.) of the Victorian Police, he appeared in the show from 1996 to 2000. He is the son of ex-Sergeant Pat Doyle, and the brother of Maggie and Robbie Doyle. Mick murdered Maggie, and himself was shot and killed by Pat after he had found out that Mick had killed Maggie.

Portrayed by David Field, 1995, and Terry Serio, 1996 - 2000

==== Pat Doyle ====
Pat Doyle was a recurring character from Australia's cop show Blue Heelers. A former Sergeant who was once stationed in the city with a young Tom Croydon, he appeared between 1994 and 2000. Pat has three children — Maggie, Robbie and Mick — all of whom are deceased and former members of the Victoria Police. As of 2000, Pat is in prison after being charged with the murder of Mick, having shot his son when he discovered that Mick was not only corrupt, but that he had also murdered his own sister Maggie.

Portrayed by Dennis Miller, 1994 – 2000

==== Robbie Doyle ====
Robbie Doyle was a recurring character from Australia's cop show Blue Heelers. A former police officer, Robbie lost his job in the force after he was shown to have a drug problem. He appeared on the show between 1996 and 1998 with his primary storyline being his struggles to cope with his heroin addiction. He is shot dead while protecting Maggie from a crazed gunman in Widgeree.

Portrayed by David Wenham, 1996, and Brett Climo, 1997 - 1998

==== Monica Draper ====
Inspector Monica Draper was a fictional character who appeared on Blue Heelers on a recurring basis from 1995 to 2006. At her introduction to the series she was with IID (Internal Investigation Division), before being promoted to Senior Sergeant over Tom Croydon. Sometime during 1997 she was promoted to Inspector of ESD. She had a kind personality, but knew how to get the job done, but never let personal feelings get in the way. She seemed to be good friends with Tom Croydon, unlike her successor Inspector Falcon-Price. She found out about her son Dean, who she had put up for adoption when she was 16, during season 5. She often visit's Mt.Thomas as part of her role in ESD (Ethical Standards Division), is tough but fair member of the team.

Before the series, Draper and P.J. worked in the gaming squad together. It was revealed in Season 2 that Draper had found illegal activity going on in the squad (something P.J. also knew but turned a blind eye to) and her actions in reporting the activity had shut down the squad, and though he wasn't involved in anything illegal, it resulted in P.J. being posted to Mt Thomas. In Season 4, P.J surprisingly came across the bag man and arrested him before the gaming squad was shut down.

Portrayed by Peta Doodson*, 1995 – 2006

* A registered nurse since 1972, Doodson was also the medical adviser to Blue Heelers.

=== E ===
==== Hilary Edmunds ====
Hilary Edmunds was a fictional character on Blue Heelers. She was an old flame of P.J's and she made guest appearances throughout the first season (1994).

Portrayed by Jennifer Botica, 1994

==== Rose Egan ====
Senior Constable Rose Egan, played by Dale Stevens, made her first appearance on 22 November 1994. Stevens's casting was publicised in the 19 November 1994 issue of TV Week. She was "thrilled" to secure the role of Rose, saying "I was in shock for two days. I walked around giggling to myself!" She also said that until her role on Blue Heelers, she had mainly played "baddies". Her character is a trainee detective and only the second female officer at Mount Thomas station after Maggie Doyle (Lisa McCune). To prepare for the role, Stevens visited a real police station and met with the detectives there to ask questions. Rose becomes rivals with Maggie, who is passed over for promotion in favour of Rose. Caron James of TV Week reported that Rose has "a traumatic past of physical and psychological abuse." While Stevens explained that Rose is actually "a real success story" as she has been through a lot.

Rose comes to Mount Thomas police station to do some detective work with P. J. Hasham (Martin Sacks) as she is going for a job in CI. She is greeted with resentment from Maggie Doyle, who also hoped to get the same job and she thought P. J. was all for her getting it. Rose is transferred after the station is deemed to have too many officers.

=== F ===
==== Russell Falcon-Price ====
Russell Falcon-Price was a fictional character from Blue Heelers. He appeared on a recurring basis between 1997 and 2006. He was portrayed by Neil Pigot. He was unpopular with most of the officers at the station and was known as 'Rusty'. At the start of his tenure at St Davids, It was apparent that Russell was trying to get some dirt on Tom Croydon in a bid to get himself further in the force. In 1999 (season 6), P.J implies that Falcon-Price is attracted to Maggie Doyle, when Maggie confronted him about this, he informs her that he was actually planning on giving her the vacant Sergeant's position. In 2003 (Season 10) Ben Stewart had an affair with the inspector's wife, Felicity. At the same time Falcon-Price showed interest in Jo Parrish (Jane Allsop). After a hostage situation involving the Falcon Price children, Ben stopped pursuing the relationship as it became apparent that it was not going anywhere. In the series finale he was successful in closing the Mount Thomas Station down but the Station was reopened towards the end of the episode, when it became known that the evidence he had used was false.

Portrayed by Neil Pigot, 1997 – 2006

==== Jasmine Farah ====
Doctor Jasmine Farah was a fictional character in the long-running Australian police drama Blue Heelers and joined the Heelers in 1999. She was a doctor at the local Mount Thomas hospital and sometimes referred to as "The Persian Princess".

Portrayed by Sapidah Kian, 1999

==== Ted Faulkner ====
Inspector Edward 'Ted' Faulkner was a fictional character in the long-running Australian police drama Blue Heelers. He first appeared in the series in late 1994 and appeared as the district police inspector, stationed at St. David; he took the place of Inspector Murray. He left the series in 1996 when fast-tracker Inspector Russell Falcon-Price took over the job, Ted now seemed very gentle and low-key compared to Falcon-Price.

Portrayed by Nick Waters, 1994 – 1996

==== Brad Fingleton ====
Brad Fingleton was a fictional character in the long-running Australian police drama Blue Heelers. He first appeared in the series in late 2003 as Constable Suzie Raynor's husband- a former cop, who was struggling to come to terms with being in a wheelchair. In the final episode of Season 10 "Sexual Healing Part 2" Brad had stolen Constable Raynor's firearm. Both Acting Sergeant Stewart & Constable Raynor were concerned that Brad was going to use it on himself. When they arrived at his place he accused Ben & Suzie of having an affair; he pulled the gun on Suzie, giving Acting Sergeant Stewart no option but to fire and kill Brad.

Portrayed by Matt Passmore, 2003

==== Clancy Freeman ====
Clancy (Joey) Freeman is a fictional character who appeared on a recurring basis in Blue Heelers. He was a mentally disabled young man, who Tom Croydon had something of a soft spot for. When Clancy's mother died suddenly from cancer, Tom arranged for his home to be turned into a group home for other mentally disabled people. Clancy would not be lonely and would have a carer living with them all. This is where he met his girlfriend with whom he had a baby (Rachel). Unfortunately after a few months it appeared they were having trouble caring properly for the baby and a foster mother was needed. Tom helped with this transaction and made sure the parents could regularly visit with their daughter.

Clancy and Jo Parrish died in the bombing of the Mount Thomas Station in episode, 'End Of Innocence' in 2004.

Portrayed by Michael Isaacs, 1995 – 2004

==== Hayley Fulton ====
Hayley Fulton was a fictional character in the long-running Australian police drama Blue Heelers. She was a young, neglected child whom Tess took in and cared for until she lost her back to her real family.

Portrayed by Emily Browning, 2000 – 2002

=== G ===
==== Ian Goss ====
Senior Constable Ian Goss, based on a real person, and known as Gossie, was a fictional character on Blue Heelers. He was an old friend of Tom Croydon's, who landed the job of running the one man station at Widgeree in Season 8 (2001). As a Widgeree local, it was believed that he should be able to keep the usually quiet town of Widgeree at piece. In 2003, (Season 10) Gossie was involved in an incident that ultimately decided his fate as a Police officer; a young French filmmaker was killed in Widgeree in an incident Gossie should have prevented. Gossie later returned in 2006 (Season 13) as a shop owner with a grudge against his old mate Tom Croydon.

The real life Ian Goss "Gossie" was a Senior Constable of Police who served in a rural town approximately 42 km north of Melbourne, Victoria, Australia. Gossie, as he was affectionately known to the community and his colleagues, was stationed at the rural town of Riddells Creek for approximately 20 years. He was a typical 'country copper' who was respected by all. His character was introduced into Blue Heelers by a Victoria Police Media Advisor who was a Sergeant with Victoria Police. That Sergeant was David O'Connor of Victoria's Western Region.

Widgeree Police Station was filmed at location at Clarkefield, Victoria, Australia. This is a short distance south of Riddells Creek. Clarkefield is famous for its hotel, which is reputed to be haunted.

Portrayed by Roy Billing, 2001 – 2003, 2006

==== Peter Grantham ====
Peter Grantham was a fictional character in the long-running Australian police drama Blue Heelers. Introduced in the first season, Grantham was a Detective Senior Sergeant at St Davids and was technically P.J.'s direct superior but he was expelled from the force after he was proven to be corrupt. He reappeared in season 2 as the security manager for the local bank after the bank was robbed and P.J. fingered as an accomplice. Maggie and her father Pat were able to prove that Grantham framed P.J. and his plan for revenge was foiled.

Portrayed by David Glazebrook, 1994 – 1995

=== H ===
==== Zoe Hamilton ====
Zoe Hamilton was a fictional character on the long-running Australian police drama Blue Heelers. She was a doctor at Mount Thomas Hospital. Zoe played a part in the show from 1995 until 1998 when she married Sergeant Nick Schultz and they moved to Melbourne so she could study at Melbourne University. Nick took up a sergeant's position at Footscray police station. Nick later became a detective sergeant with the homicide squad.

Portrayed by Karen Davitt*, 1995 – 1998

* Davitt played a nurse named Karen at the Mt Thomas Hospital during season one before becoming Dr Hamilton in season 2.

==== Alan Hayes ====
Alan Hayes was a fictional character on the long-running Australian police drama Blue Heelers. Known around Mount Thomas as 'Compo', he was always cooking up some kind of scheme to get compensation or money. Despite his reputation, Compo was a good citizen at times, organising a charity event to raise money for the CFA on one occasion, but using the opportunity to run an SP book.

Portrayed by Tony Rickards, 1995 - 2003

==== Rory Hayes ====
Rory Hayes is a fictional character in Australia's popular Police series Blue Heelers. He appeared in the season 12 finale and appeared on a recurring basis in the 13th and final season of the series.

Rory was 9 years old when he entered the series. He came to the town of Mount Thomas dressed in a Darth Vader costume and claimed to be on a mission. He later said that it was to find his father. At first, it was thought that Evan Jones was his dad, but when Rory's mother arrived it was revealed that his father was Alex Kirby. Rory had already become attached to Jonsey so he at first resented Alex. In the episode "On The Lonely", after there was a shooting in front of the Primary School that Rory attended, he went missing and Alex panicked and was desperate to find him. It turned out that Rory was just scared and went home. When Alex found him he immediately ran over and hugged him, showing his love and concern for Rory. Another episode that showed this was the episode when Rory was rushed to hospital with appendicitis.

In later episodes, Rory accepted Alex as his dad and the two developed a loving relationship.

Portrayed by Louis Corbett of McKinnon Secondary College, 2005 – 2006

=== K ===
==== Siobhan Kennedy ====
Siobhan Kennedy was a fictional character on the long-running Australian TV series Blue Heelers. A self-confessed witch, Siobhan was friendly with the Heelers, in particular Ben Stewart, even if they thought she was a bid odd. Siobhan was often asked to consult on cases involving the supernatural. She appeared on a recurring basis between 1996 and 1997 and again between 2000 and 2001.

Portrayed by Rosalind Hammond, 1996 - 1997, and Marie-Louise Walker, 2000 - 2001

==== Harriet Keppell ====
Harriet Keppell was a fictional character on the long-running Australian TV series Blue Heelers. She was a journalist who always seemed to get in the way. She appeared on a recurring basis from 1995 to 1996.

Portrayed by Beverly Evans, 1995 – 1996

==== Tibor Kerenyi ====
Dr. Tibor Kerenyi was a fictional character on the long-running Australian TV series Blue Heelers. He was the local veterinarian who was regularly called in to help the Heelers whenever their cases involved sick or injured animals. He appeared on a recurring basis from 1995 until 2001.

Portrayed by Colin Duckworth, 1995 – 2001

==== Johnny Kowalski ====
Detective Constable Johnny Kowalski, played by Jack Finsterer, made his first appearance in the third season episode "Mud Sticks", broadcast on 3 September 1996. The character was created as a temporary replacement for P. J. Hasham, whose actor Martin Sacks was promoting the show in Europe. Finsterer described Johnny as being "a very good detective. But as soon as a woman walks through the door, he's completely distracted. When Johnny arrives at Mt Thomas he's in seventh heaven, because there are two women – Dash and Maggie – at the station." The actor added that Johnny thinks that everyone is attracted to him and every woman wants "to be conquered." However as Johnny becomes more overt with his advances towards Maggie Doyle (Lisa McCune), she makes it clear that she "is not to be trifled with". Dash McKinley (Tasma Walton) is more naïve and is taken in by Johnny's smoothness, until she realises what he is about.

=== L ===
==== Len ====
Len was a fictional character on Blue Heelers and was the barman in Mount Thomas' Imperial Pub.

Portrayed by Axl Taylor, 1994 – 2002

=== M ===
==== Beth McKinley ====
Beth McKinley was a fictional character in the long-running Australian police drama Blue Heelers and joined the cast in 1996 playing the mother of new Probationary Constable, Dash McKinley. Beth had 9 children and was widowed when Dash was just 2. Beth was very well known in Mount Thomas, and very knowledgeable about everything to do with the town and its inhabitants. (On more than one occasion Sergeant Croyden told Dash he didn't want to hear any of her mothers gossip in the station, yet other times the stories she had heard from her mother came in helpful when looking for suspects) She was a member of local Mount Thomas women's groups and got along with everyone in Mount Thomas. She was killed in season 6 in a car accident, this made Dash consider her future and she resigned from the force

Portrayed by Pauline Terry-Bietz, 1996 – 1999

==== Charlie McKinley ====
Charlie McKinley was a fictional recurring character in the long-running series Blue Heelers. He played the older brother to constable Dash McKinley and had a primary school aged daughter who was often compared to dash, as a bit of a loudmouth and troublemaker.

Portrayed by Kevin Harrington, 1997 – 1999, 2003

==== David Murray ====
David Murray was a fictional character in the long-running Australian police drama Blue Heelers. He played a lawyer late in the series and had a relationship with Kelly; they moved in together in season 13.

Portrayed by Joshua Lawson, 2006

=== N ===
==== Sean Neale ====
Detective Constable Sean Neale, played by Richard Huggett, made his first appearance on 16 August 1994. Sean was a detective based at district headquarters in St Davids. He comes to Mount Thomas to aid a rape investigation. He also becomes a love interest for Maggie Doyle (Lisa McCune), who he is "besotted" with. Huggett described his character as "very methodical and logical." After twice finding himself under suspicion for corruption he departed for a fresh start in Melbourne.

==== Stacey Norse ====
Stacey Norse was a fictional character in the long-running Australian police drama Blue Heelers. She was married to Adam after she became pregnant with, what Adam thought was, his baby, which she miscarried. She left the series in the same year she arrived, 1997, when she and her former boyfriend (The Father of the Miscarried baby) got back together, and tried to kill Adam, so she could have the insurance money for starting her new life, their plot was revealed and they were taken into custody

Portrayed by Kate Atkinson, 1997

=== P ===
==== Sasha Peters ====
Sasha Peters was a fictional character in the long-running Australian police drama Blue Heelers. Sasha entered the series as the wife of one of Nick's friends, but her life took a tragic turn when her husband was killed in a high-speed chase during a speed blitz. Sasha grew close to Nick but their relationship suffered after her brother was arrested by the Heelers.

Portrayed by Jane Longhurst, 1995

==== Merv Poole ====
Merv Poole was a fictional character on Blue Heelers.

Portrayed by Peter Aanensen, 1997 – 2004

==== Keith Purvis ====
Keith Purvis was a fictional character in the long-running Australian police drama Blue Heelers. He was a real "fair-dinkum" farmer and was always there to cause a stir when the copper were quiet. He considered himself very patriotic and felt it was his right, or maybe his responsibility, to preside over things and sort out the problems in the community. Using force if necessary, it was not a rare sight to see him strutting around with a gun in his hand, despite having had his gun licence revoked.

Portrayed by Reg Evans, 1995 – 2000

=== R ===
==== "Richo" ====
Richo was a fictional character in Blue Heelers.

Portrayed by Stuart Baker, 1995 – 2004

==== Tim Ryan ====
Tim Ryan was a fictional character in the long-running Australian police drama Blue Heelers from 1998 until 1999.

Portrayed by Grant Piro, 1998 – 1999

=== T ===
==== Robyn Taylor ====
Senior Constable Robyn Taylor, played by Belinda McClory, made her first appearance in season 1 episode 21 1994 then on 5 May 1999. McClory guested as Robyn for six-weeks. Robyn comes to Mount Thomas as part of the Accident Investigation Squad, she expresses an interest in moving to the country. She was soon Gazetted to the Accident Investigation Squad St David's. She, her husband and fourteen-month-old daughter settled on land in Mount Thomas, with the aim of starting a vineyard. She was lent to Mount Thomas for the remainder of Maggie Doyle's (Lisa McCune) time in witness protection but, when her husband was charged with major fraud, she and her daughter returned to Melbourne.

==== Tony Timms ====
Tony Timms was played by Jeremy Kewley from 1997 until 2005. He was Mount Thomas' less than helpful journalist, who wrote primarily for the Mount Thomas Gazette. He was involved in many dramas in Mount Thomas and was quite often a bit of a problem for the local officers.

=== W ===
==== Jack Woodley ====
Senior Detective Jack Woodley, played by Frankie J. Holden, made his first appearance on 30 April 1996. Woodley replaced Wayne Patterson (Grant Bowler) after he died, and he came from the Armed Robbery Squad in Melbourne. He came as a surprise to everyone at the station because they all believed they would get a young probationary constable, not an experienced city detective. He had a wife and two children and was aiming on having a quiet country life in Mount Thomas. In his first episode, he and P. J. Hasham (Martin Sacks) were investigating the burglary and assault of a police widow and, to speed things up, Jack planted evidence on the main suspect, this went unnoticed at the time. He later planted evidence on another innocent man in the murder case of a shearer and this led PJ to believe something was going on. In his fourth episode, after PJ had done some investigating, he found out that Jack had been falsifying evidence and he had a big decision on his hands – report it and get Jack dismissed and also lose the case which Maggie Doyle (Lisa McCune) was about to prosecute, or do nothing and win the case. He decided he would have to tell the truth and Jack was dismissed from the police force.
