= Dash McKinley =

Deirdre McKinley
- Blue Heelers character
- First appearance: "The Kremin Factor"; 18 June 1996
- Last appearance: "The Full Circle"; 14 July 1999
- Portrayed by: Tasma Walton

In-universe information
- Nickname: Dash
- Occupation: Constable
- Family: Beth McKinley (mother); Alec McKinley (brother); Charlie McKinley (brother); Ian McKinley (brother); Madeleine McKinley (sister); Dave McKinley (brother); Judy McKinley (sister); Evelyn McKinley (sister); Fiona McKinley (niece)

Deirdre Elaine "Dash" McKinley is a fictional character from the Australian drama series Blue Heelers, played by Tasma Walton. She made her first appearance in the third season episode "The Kremin Factor", which was broadcast on 18 June 1996. One of her major storylines occurred during the 1998 season, when she was diagnosed with cancer. Dash was the youngest of nine children. She had a kind personality but a big mouth. She and her family always seemed to be the first to know the town's gossip and everyone's business. The character departed during the sixth season on 14 July 1999.

== Development ==
When the Blue Heelers producers began looking for a new cast member, they received hundreds of applicants due to the popularity of the show, which was number one in the ratings at the time, and it became "one of the most sought-after acting roles in the country." On 27 April 1996, Rachel Browne from The Sun-Herald reported Tasma Walton had joined the cast as Constable Deirdre McKinley. Of being cast, Walton stated "I was so excited. It's going to be really challenging. It's one of the best shows in Australia to work on." She had previously guested in the show as a schoolgirl in 1995, but Dash was her first ongoing television role. Due to her experience with the show, she found it easy to "slip into the regular spot" and said the "family atmosphere" on the set helped to bring out qualities in the other characters that viewers may not have seen before. Browne confirmed that Walton's first scenes would air in June of that year. Dash is introduced as a 19 year old, rookie Constable. Walton spoke with some of the younger recruits at the police academy during her research for the role.

In December 1998, Walton announced her departure from the series. Browne stated the actress would leave in the middle of 1999.

== Storylines ==
Dash first appeared in the season three episode "The Kremin Factor". She refused to call Tom Croydon 'boss', instead calling her superior by his first name. She and Tom got off to a dreadful start; while talking to the others about Tom, Dash stated that he was fat and old, not knowing he was behind her. Dash also couldn't drive, losing her police licence back at Fitzroy.

The beginning of Season 5 the episodes "Secrets, part 1 and 2" marked Dash's 21st birthday. At the same time her Constable accreditation had come through (ending her probation) and the Heelers decided to use the two occasions to have a surprise celebration to mark the events. Unfortunately before the upcoming celebration, Dash is taken hostage, along with a school class in an awkward custody case.

Later on in the season, in the episode "Deed not the Breed" she discovers she has cancer; she then undergoes heavy chemotherapy, and eventually recovers. She also has a brief relationship with Adam Cooper.

In the sixth season of Blue Heelers, Dash quickly found herself pursuing relationships with the new members, eventually falling to her knees over the idea of fulfilling the future needs as a hopeful co-detective alongside the upper-ranked PJ. This idea was first prompted upon the orders of Inspector Monica Draper, who at the time appeared to have a serious personality clash with rising rank ' Taylor '. This would soon give McKinley her very first chance, submitting herself towards the idolised career choice. Unfortunately in doing this, McKinley's hopeful career would somewhat fall short and ironically come to a sudden end following the shocking death of her very close Mother.

== Reception ==
For her portrayal of Dash, Walton won Most Popular New Talent at the 1997 Logie Awards. While viewing the character's debut, Rachel Browne of The Sydney Morning Herald observed that trouble follows Dash wherever she goes. Browne also wrote: "Dash is brazen and brash, everything the Pollyanna-ish Constable Maggie Doyle (Lisa McCune) is not. Expect some long-overdue fireworks." Browne's colleague Robin Oliver stated "The Heelers adroitly acquired a bit of popular silliness with the arrival of the good-looking, good-hearted young Dash (Tasma Walton), a walking disaster area who this week is sent on a burglary inquiry and is overcome with desire to own the victim's car."
