= Mount Thomas =

Fictional town in Blue Heelers

- 'Blue Heelers' location
- First appearance: A Woman's Place; Ep. 1 (Pilot), 18/1/1994
- Last appearance: One Day More (Pt. 2); Ep. 510, 4/6/2006
- Created by: Hal McElroy

In-universe information
- Location: Australia
- Characters: Tom Croydon, Chris Riley, P.J. Hasham, Maggie Doyle
- Population: 7805

Mount Thomas is the fictional town featured in the long-running Australian police procedural drama Blue Heelers, which ran from 1994 up until its cancelation in 2006. The program was filmed in Victorian suburbs of Werribee, Williamstown and Castlemaine, which were all used for the show's exterior scenes to depict Mount Thomas, whilst interior scenes were filmed in-house at the Seven Network studios.

== Town synopsis ==
In Blue Heelers, Mount Thomas is located in the state of Victoria in a very rough northern triangle with the real towns of Echuca, Swan Hill and Benalla nearby. In episode 321, Mount Thomas is shown to be located in the fictional Victorian Parliament electoral district of Hetherington, along with St Davids and the surrounding district. In episode 56, the population is given on a "Welcome to Mt. Thomas" sign as 7805; in episode 266 a different sign states the population is now 6399, which is likely a continuity error, as the circumstances on the show do not indicate such a significant drop in residents. Nevertheless, the town is large enough for a police force of five officers plus a detective, a court house, a railway station and yards, hospital, primary and secondary schools, football and cricket clubs and a swimming pool - but still small enough that most members of the community are known to everyone else.

It is also large enough to have its own town council, a newspaper (The Gazette) and at least eleven pubs, including "The Imperial", which serves as both the "copper's pub" and home to several of the officers, new to town with nowhere else to live but one of Chris Riley's rooms. Significant action takes place here throughout the series given its importance to the "Heelers" and Chris' involvement in the community.

Other pubs in Mount Thomas (regularly mentioned but rarely featured) are:

- "The Commercial" (The Imperial's main rival)
- "The Railway"
- "The Federal"
- "The Steam Packet" (frequently described by characters as being the worst)
- "Customs House"
- "The Cumberland"
- "The Mainland"
- Unnamed pub, near the court house
- Unnamed pub, near the Coles supermarket
- Unnamed pub, near the football oval.

There is also at least one motel, a motor inn and a caravan park. A local country radio station, 4TM, is mentioned in episode 4, but soon after the only reference is to 3SD, which is the station in nearby St Davids.

A number of real-life businesses can be seen in Mount Thomas throughout the show. Various characters remark that the town has been in trouble commercially, or will be in trouble in the future due to lack of employment.

Mount Thomas is shown to be close to a national park and surrounded by open farmland, a river, and a lake, called Lake Widgeree on the show.

== Etymology ==
In the third season it is revealed that the town was settled by a person called Colonel Thomas. The town is presumably named in his honour.

Characters on the show sometimes jokingly refer to Mount Thomas to as the "Crime Capital of Australia" due to the constant stream of murders, thefts, kidnappings, explosions, shootings and assaults which happened on Blue Heelers on a weekly basis.

The town was described by character Roz Patterson (played by Australian actor Ann Burbrook), as "the place where elephants go to die".

== Nearby locations ==
=== St Davids ===
Mount Thomas and the nearby small settlement of Widgeree are overseen by the St Davids police district, based in the larger town of St Davids (also fictional), which has a population of just over 68 000. Successive inspectors, Ted Faulkner and Russell Falcon-Price, are based there, as is Inspector Monica Draper of Ethical Standards Division (E.S.D.). The C.I.B. in St Davids is supervised by a Detective Sergeant who is also responsible for the detectives based at Mount Thomas, though this is very rarely mentioned or explored after being a major plotline in the first season. St Davids Police Station also hosts a district Forensic Services department, but other more specialised units, such as the Homicide Squad, Special Operations Group and Accident Investigation Squad respond from Melbourne.

St Davids is also the home of a local radio station, known as 3SD, and a Prime7 television station, as well as a number of amenities not offered in Mount Thomas including a multiplex cinema.

According to a sign seen during Season 1, St Davids is located 37 kilometres from Mount Thomas.

=== Widgeree ===
Widgeree is a small country town where there is very little in the way of business besides the obligatory pub and life revolves around the local footy club. With a small population, everyone knows everyone and policing in Widgeree is a bit different than in the larger towns and cities. Served by a small, one-man police station, the incumbent police officer is technically under the supervision of the Sergeant at Mount Thomas although the local copper, a senior constable, is generally left to their own devices. After the original senior constable, Al McCubbin, is suspended during season 1, Widgeree Station is closed down and Mount Thomas assumes the additional role of policing Widgeree until the station is reopened in season 8. The position is given to an over-zealous young senior constable who quickly makes an enemy of the townspeople; he is soon "encouraged" to transfer and the post is assumed by Tom Croydon's old friend Senior Constable Ian Goss for a number of years until he too falls into a lax mindset and gradually loses the cooperation of locals, resulting in a criminal family wreaking havoc. At the end of his tether, Goss seriously assaults one of them and resigns rather than face disciplinary action, in a huge blow to Tom. Goss is replaced by Senior Constable Rochelle de la Rue who is eventually written out and the station remained closed, until season 11 when it was reopened for one episode. At the end of the episode wigderee police station was burnt down and was never rebuild and remained closed until the seasons end.

In season 1, the distance between Mount Thomas and Widgeree is given as a 90-minute drive, which necessitates the town having its own station to provide a prompt police response. After a few years, writers reduced the distance significantly, finally having Constable Jo Parrish remark in season 9 that it is now a 20-minute drive to Widgeree. In reality, such a short distance would not really require Widgeree to have its own station as officers could respond even more quickly from Mount Thomas in an emergency. Despite injuries and fires occurring in the town during the series, there is no mention of Widgeree having its own fire or ambulance stations. Nearby Lake Widgeree is long mentioned as a popular spot for boating and hunting events.

=== Evanleigh ===
Rarely mentioned in the show, Evanleigh is home to the regional superintendent, Clive Adamson, who has ultimate responsibility for St Davids, Mount Thomas and Widgeree. Very little is known about Evanleigh, however since it is home to the superintendent it is presumably a substantially sized city, perhaps similar in size to Ballarat.

== Real locations used ==
The majority of exterior scenes were filmed in Wyndham, Williamstown and from time-to-time at Castlemaine, all in the state of Victoria. Castlemaine, in the Victorian Goldfields region 90 minutes north of Melbourne, played Mount Thomas in the major aerial shots of the town.

To contain production costs location scenes needed to be shot close to the South Melbourne studios of Channel Seven, so coastal Williamstown (20 mins south west of the city) - noted for its Victorian and Federation architecture - was chosen. The railway yards of adjacent Newport were the location for the Mount Thomas rail yards, and the scene of numerous crimes. The nearby basalt plains around Werribee were suitable to represent farming and bush country.

The shots looking north were filmed from the Burke & Wills monument towards the former Castlemaine Gaol. The southern shots were filmed at the Castlemaine Gaol looking over Castlemaine railway station towards the Post Office clock tower.

Coincidentally the exterior of "The Imperial Hotel" is a former local pub called "Beck's Imperial Hotel" (which was marked up with beer signage for cut away scenes). Today it is a decaying second hand clothes and antiques store - and the interior has no resemblance to Chris Riley's pub. "The Imperial" is right next door to the real Castlemaine Police Station (although this has never been featured in the show), and also across the road from the Castlemaine Courthouse. In at least two (earlier) episodes, real police cars belonging to Castlemaine Police Station (different makes to the production vehicles used as "Mount Thomas" units) are inadvertently seen parked in the street during exterior shots of The Imperial.

The first Mount Thomas Police Station was actually the former Williamstown Police Station where the majority of the Mount Thomas street scenes were filmed. Early in the series the building was sold and converted to a residence and was specially decorated for filming.

Shots and scenes for Widgeree was filmed on location at Clarkefield. Including Clarkefield Coach & Horses, which was used as the Widgeree pub, on the same street just three houses down is where Widgeree Police Station was filmed, which is actually a private residence and was only dressed up as a police station for the show.
