= Nick Schultz (Blue Heelers) =

- Blue Heelers character
- First appearance: "A Women's Place"; 18 January 1994
- Last appearance: "Burden of Proof"; 9 February 2005
- Portrayed by: William McInnes

In-universe information
- Titles: Senior Constable; Acting Sergeant; Sergeant; Detective Sergeant
- Occupation: Traffic Division (1994-95); General Duties (1995-98); Homicide Squad (2004-05)
- Spouses: Jennifer Schultz (dec.); Zoe Hamilton (1998–present)
- Children: Zoe Schultz; Toby Schultz
- Relatives: Klaus Schultz (father); Elizabeth Schultz (mother)

Nicholas "Nick" Schultz is a fictional character from the Australian television series Blue Heelers, portrayed by William McInnes. He was introduced in the first season episode "A Women's Place", broadcast on 18 January 1994. He departed in episode 207, but returned to the series as a guest star for five episodes (441–445) in 2004 and a further two episodes (458–459) in 2005 as a homicide detective based in Melbourne.

== Storylines ==
Nick is the son of Klaus Schultz, a German-Australian who served in the Afrika Corps during World War II, and his wife Elizabeth. He grew up in Sydney, near the beach, before moving to Victoria at some point prior to the first series. At some point, he married Jennifer, who later gave birth to a daughter, Zoe.

A few years before the start of the series, Jennifer and Zoe were killed when a drunk driver collided with their car, a tragedy which inspired Nick to join the traffic division in hope of preventing others from going through the same grief and trauma.

Along with P.J. Hasham, Nick is the first character seen in the pilot episode with the pair performing random breath tests on motorists entering Mount Thomas. He is revealed to be the sole police officer attached to the Mount Thomas Traffic Division although he often helps out the other officers with other police matters.

It is also revealed that Nick volunteers his time to teach basketball to kids at the local gym as part of the police's Blue Light community scheme. At one point, Nick clashes with P.J. after the detective begins questioning youths over a crime. Nick tells P.J. that the gym is a place that gives the local kids something to do and where the police can blend in and not be seen as police, not a place where P.J. can pump the kids for information.

He also clashed with Roz Patterson over traffic fines after she was caught driving 19 km/h above the speed limit, causing her to lose her license. Despite pleas from Roz and her husband (and Nick's colleague) Wayne, Nick refused to budge and he later confessed that his wife and daughter had been killed by a drunk driver.

During the second season, Nick has several personality clashes with Wayne. The first occurred during a traffic blitz in Mt Thomas while Wayne was the passenger of a Traffic Operations Group officer during a pursuit which was not terminated despite the officer being ordered to do so and, as a result, Billy Peters, a friend of Nick's, was killed in a high-speed accident. The second clash occurred when one of Wayne's mates ran over and killed a girl who Nick had befriended while driving under the influence.

After the Mt Thomas Traffic Division is closed down, Nick moves into the police residence and becomes the watch-house keeper. The police had an unwritten rule that watch-housekeepers should be married so that the officers wife could also work at the station (unpaid) cleaning the cells and the office as well as providing meals for those in the lock-up. Following Tom Croydon's advice, Nick enlisted the help of the Police Association (the police union) in order to get the job, forcing an unhappy district Inspector Ted Faulkner into giving him the job so as to not look like Nick was being discriminated against for being single. This also caused a minor conflict with Wayne who had been the watch-house keeper until his marriage to Roz had ended. Wayne had moved into traffic with Nick before being moved to general duties when traffic closed with Wayne accusing Nick of looking after himself while forgetting about his mate. Nick also begins a relationship with Sasha Peters (Billy's widow) which lasts only a few months. He also conducted an intervention on Tom's younger daughter, Susan, who had become mixed up in a cult, revealing to her that he knew what cults were like as his late wife had also been taken in by a cult during a rocky point of their marriage.

Early in 1996, Nick is accused of murder after the death in custody of suspected child killer. His colleagues are suspicious because of his particular hatred of that type of criminal; he takes child homicide cases personally because they bring back painful memories of his daughter.

When Wayne Patterson dies after being run over by a car outside of the police station, Nick is furious because Wayne's parents refuse to allow the Heelers, other than Tom Croydon, to attend the funeral, taking out his anger on Roz when she arrives in Mt Thomas to inform them of the Pattersons' wishes. Despite this, Nick and the others are able to pay tribute in their own way, arriving at the church in time to perform a guard of honour as Wayne's coffin is carried to the hearse. Nick later finds some solace in his friendship with Doctor Zoe Hamilton who works at the Mt Thomas Hospital.

In one of the most notable episodes of the season, Nick tries to save two young girls from drowning in a flood, with Adam Cooper's help. He instructs Adam to go and radio in to get help but when Adam ran back to the car, the road it was on had been washed away, with another young girl inside. While Adam tries to get to the girl in the car, Nick thinks Adam has abandoned him.

Later in the season, Nick and the other Heelers are suspicious of Adam's new wife, Stacey, and treat her with some distrust, though Nick later offers Stacey comfort after Adam is shot. It is later discovered that Adam's shooting was part of a plan by Stacey to claim life insurance and move away with the real father of the child she had previously miscarried.

Early in 1998, a review team arrives in Mt Thomas to evaluate the police station and the Heelers try desperately to appear busy to prevent the station from being downgraded. Nick however, has been saddled with local reporter Tony Timms and his attempts to bore the journalist almost cause the Heelers plans to backfire and Nick concocts a missing person to make up for it.

When the station is upgraded, Nick has hopes of being promoted to Sergeant but to his dismay Inspector Falcon-Price chooses to appoint P.J. as Acting Sergeant instead. After P.J. found himself incapable of staying out of CI affairs and self-demoted himself, Nick was named Acting Sergeant in his place.

In this season, Nick begins a relationship with Zoe. He proposes to her early in the season but things are complicated when they become suspects in the murder of Zoe's ex-boyfriend. As the season continues, he becomes frustrated that Tom isn't letting him do his job as sergeant and even considers a transfer. He follows PJ's advice, however, and reconsiders the transfer. Late in the year he proposes to Zoe again, this time successfully. The two are married in a Mt Thomas park and the couple leave after the wedding for Melbourne, where Nick has been posted to the police station at Footscray.

After six years in Melbourne, Nick returns to Mt Thomas as a Detective Sergeant working with the Homicide Squad to investigate the deadly explosion at Mt Thomas Police Station. While he is in town, Nick is also called in to investigate several suspicious deaths which appear to be related. After the investigations are completed, Nick returns to Melbourne.

Nick returns to Mt Thomas once again to investigate a suspicious death where the chief suspect is none other than his former boss, Tom Croydon. After Tom is cleared, Nick leaves Mt Thomas for the last time and returns to Melbourne.
