= Blue Heelers season 8 =

Blue Heelers
- Season 8
- No. of episodes: 42

Release
- Original network: Seven Network
- Original release: 21 February – 28 November 2001

Season chronology
- ← Previous; Season 7 Next → Season 9

The eighth season of the Australian police-drama Blue Heelers premiered on the Seven Network on 21 February 2001 and aired on Wednesday nights at 8:30 PM. The 42-episode season concluded 28 November 2001. The main cast returned from season 7 barring the departure of Lisa McCune as Maggie Doyle and with the introduction of Ditch Davey as Evan 'Jonesy' Jones. Like preceding seasons, the eighth season was released on DVD both as a two part set and a complete set, on 1 October 2008.

== Casting ==
=== Main ===
- John Wood as Senior Sergeant Tom Croydon
- Julie Nihill as Christine 'Chris' Riley
- Martin Sacks as Senior Detective Patrick Joseph 'P.J.' Hasham
- Paul Bishop as Senior Constable Benjamin 'Ben' Stewart
- Rupert Reid as Constable Jack Lawson
- Jane Allsop as Constable Jo Parrish
- Ditch Davey as Constable Evan 'Jonesy' Jones
- Caroline Craig as Sergeant Tess Gallagher

=== Guest stars ===
- Carol Burns
- Richard Cawthorne
- Norman Yemm
- Val Lehman
- David Clencie
- Simon Burke
- Terry Gill
- Alethea McGrath
- Gary Sweet
- Rhys Muldoon
- Gary Day
- Lisa Crittenden
- Julia Blake
- Alan Hopgood
- Gerard Kennedy
- Lesley Baker
- Mat Stevenson
- Kirsty Child

== Plot ==
Jack is beginning to get the hang of his legs again after the 5% operation was a success. Tess begins to have feelings for Jack up to a point where they start a secret relationship in the episode "Manly Art". Their relationship is going somewhere until a case comes up about an old time drug dealer who just got out of prison. Jack begins to put his emotions in front of the job and will do anything to get his own justice. Jack is suspect for murder by Killing the drug dealer. Tess says one of them should get a transfer to St Davids because they could never work together if they can't trust one another. Jack then admits he could have saved the guy but instead watched him fall to his death. Jack is charged and dismissed from the force. While Tess is feeling sad the members are disappointed by the fact he did kill the guy and didn't admit the truth earlier. New probationary Constable Jones has arrived with a secret plot to find out what really happened in his father's death. Tess and Jo quickly take a liking to him but Tess remembers what happened to her last secret relationship with Jack and doesn't want to relive that moment so she keeps it to herself and gets on with her job as a sergeant. After all Tess knows not to mix work with play. Jonesy suspects a local building contractor, Les Anderson, of murdering his father. After a DDT poisoning is connected to Anderson, Jonesy inserts himself into the investigation. Commander Jones, Jonesy's adoptive father, halts the investigation as Jonesy realizes there's been a coverup in his father's case. Anderson is then implicated in a death on his building site and later he's found very seriously assaulted. Before he dies, he confesses privately to Jonesy that he did kill Jonesy's father. By the time the team has solid evidence of the crime, Anderson has died and Jonesy has to decide if he will stay in the police force. Tess finds a child from a troubled home has slept in overnight in her car. More trauma touches the family when Tess makes an error in professional judgement, and when things don't go well for the child in her new placement, Tess adopts her. Tom starts a relationship with Grace Curtis, the new Anglican minister, but her son's bad behavior is too great a strain on the relationship.

== Reception ==
Ratings in the 8th season began to decline slowly, with many fans disliking Maggie's absence, or the absence of the so-called "McCune-Factor".

== Awards ==
=== Logie Awards ===
Year	Nominee	Award	Result
2001	Lisa McCune	Most Popular Personality on Australian Television	Nomination
2001	John Wood	Most Popular Personality on Australian Television	Nomination
2001	John Wood	Most Popular Actor	Nomination
2001	Martin Sacks	Most Popular Actor	Win
2001	Blue Heelers	Most Popular Programme	Nomination
2001	Caroline Craig	Most Popular New Female Talent	Nomination

=== Australian Film Institute (AFI) Awards ===
Year	Nominee	Award	Result
2001	Gary Day (ep. 322)	Best Actor in a Guest Role in a TV Drama Series	Win
2001	Carol Burns (ep. 297)	Best Actor in a Guest Role in a TV Drama Series	Nomination

== Episodes ==
No. overall	No. in season	Title	Directed by	Written by	Australian air date
295	1	"The Blame Game (1)"	Grant Brown	Bill Garner	21 February 2001
A woman rushes into the station claiming a man has kidnapped her children, and Ben's work starts to mirror his private life.
296	2	"The Blame Game (2)"	Declan Eames	Bill Garner and Harriet Smith	28 February 2001
The father of the children appears in court with a bomb strapped to his body and abducts Ben.
297	3	"Deadly Fascination"	Kevin Carlin	David Boutland	7 March 2001
A crime fiction writer is asking a lot of questions about the death of a baby 25 years ago.
298	4	"Letter of the Law"	Chris Langman	Tony Morphett	14 March 2001
Tess and Tom must choose a new policeman for nearby Widgeree.
299	5	"A Bit on the Side"	Grant Brown	Dave Worthington	21 March 2001
PJ is faced with the opportunity to move back to the city when two detectives turn up.
300	6	"Tough Nut"	Declan Eames	Cassandra Carter	28 March 2001
Tess takes on more than her job demands when she tries to help the three children of a local woman.
301	7	"The Fine Print"	Raymond Quint	Peter Dick	4 April 2001
PJ's mother comes to stay and trouble quickly follows. Can he keep a professional distance while allowing his mother to play a vital role in solving the case?
302	8	"Family Reserve"	Kevin Carlin	Jo Merle and John Banas	11 April 2001
Jo is under pressure when her parents arrive in town to find their "princess" another career.
303	9	"Chop Chop"	Chris Langman	David Allen	18 April 2001
PJ's plans for an illegal tobacco raid are blown.
304	10	"Blood"	Roger Hodgman	Deborah Parsons	25 April 2001
Mick Boyce has just finished doing time. What is he doing in Mount Thomas? Jack decides to make him feel unwelcome and Tess tires of his apologies and begins to doubt him as an objective member of the team.
305	11	"They Don't Make Them Like They Used To"	Raymond Quint	Chris Corbett	2 May 2001
Jo takes on a case involving Mount Thomas' only cinema which goes back 30 years.
306	12	"Love and Money"	Graham Thorburn	David Boutland	9 May 2001
Arnie Briggs is out of prison and Jack is after him dragging Tess into a highly volatile situation.
307	13	"Fowl Play"	Peter Sharp	Bill Garner	16 May 2001
Jo takes on a case as an amusing diversion from paperwork, only to find it could have life threatening consequences for the people of Mount Thomas.
308	14	"Fooling Around"	Kevin Carlin	Michaeley O'Brien	23 May 2001
Ben's love of drink and woman lead him into dangerous terrain - both personally and professionally.
309	15	"Death By Flight"	Chris Langman	David Worthington	30 May 2001
A plane crashes into a farmhouse, killing three people, and P.J. and Ben face emotional barriers while investigating a complex case.
310	16	"A Friend Indeed"	Richard jasek	Yuki Asano and Caroline Stanton	6 June 2001
Jo defends a simple young man who appears manipulated by so called friends, willing to let him be the fall guy, and in the process questions her own ideas of friendship and betrayal.
311	17	"The Manly Art"	Kevin Carlin	Caroline Stanton	13 June 2001
P.J. plays cupid in helping Jack form a romantic bond with Tess.
312	18	"Falling Part 1"	Peter Sharp	Tony Morphett	20 June 2001
Tess is forced to confront her worst fears - that Jack will do anything, even lie to her, in order to carry out his own version of justice.
313	19	"Falling Part 2"	Grant Brown	John Banas	20 June 2001
Jack's and Tess' romance is on full throttle, but neither of them are aware of what lies ahead professionally, and how far Jack is prepared to go in order to see his own version of justice done. Final appearance of Constable Jack Lawson
314	20	"Winners And Losers"	Aarne Neeme	David Allen	27 June 2001
Tess must put Jack out of her mind when her attempts to rescue a kidnapped boy placing her own life in danger.
315	21	"No Place Like Home"	Riccardo Pelizzeri	Deborah Parsons and David Allen	11 July 2001
P.J. must confront his deepest beliefs when a desperate young man needs his help.
316	22	"Dragged"	Peter Sharp	Bill Garner	18 July 2001
Tess must accept the help of Jonesy, the rebellious new constable, when a young suspect becomes bent on revenge. First appearance of Constable Evan Jones
317	23	"Baby Love"	Steve Mann	Cliff Green	25 July 2001
Jonesy's preconceptions about the sanctity of parenthood are challenged when he befriends a young mother in trouble.
318	24	"An Inspector Calls"	Roger Hodgman	Dave Worthington	1 August 2001
Jo and Falcon-Price have no choice but to work as a team when both their lives are threatened.
319	25	"Dinosaurs"	Steve Mann	Chris Corbett	8 August 2001
Tom is faced with one of the toughest decisions of his career when two old friends are suspected of theft.
320	26	"Charming"	Esben Storm	Cassandra Carter	15 August 2001
Ben's protective instincts threaten to overcome him as he races to save a young girl from certain harm.
321	27	"The Sins of the Father"	Fiona Banks	Carol Williams	22 August 2001
Jo must confront her prejudices when a local politician dies under suspicious circumstances.
322	28	"Poisoned Fruit Part 1"	Denny Lawrence	Tony Morphett	29 August 2001
Jonesy risks everything to avenge his father's death.
323	29	"Poisoned Fruit Part 2"	Roger Hodgman	Tony Morphett	5 September 2001
As Jonesy fights to discover the truth, the Commander's reputation is placed against the wall. Have his protective instincts allowed a murderer to walk free?
324	30	"Fifteen Minutes"	Fiona Banks	Abe Pogos	19 September 2001
Jo's vanity threatens to undermine her ability to do her job.
325	31	"Copping The Flak"	Declan Eames	Caroline Stanton	26 September 2001
Ben and Jonesy's essential differences threaten to complicate an investigation.
326	32	"Strays"	Chris Langman	Philip Dalkin	3 October 2001
Tess questions her own happiness when that of a little girl is threatened.
327	33	"The Lord Giveth"	Declan Eames	John Banas	10 October 2001
An investigation into a nobly motivated burglar leads Tom to discover the identity of a mysterious and attractive woman.
328	34	"Credit Limit"	Daina Reid	Dave Worthington	17 October 2001
Jonesy's inexperience and good intentions place lives at risk.
329	35	"A Hard Call"	Aarne Neeme	Bill Garner	17 October 2001
Tess' actions are placed under scrutiny when she makes a life and death decision.
330	36	"Role Model"	Chris Langman	David Allen	24 October 2001
Tom questions the role of a mentor when a burglar's bid to impress leads to a serious crime.
331	37	"A Safe Bet"	Declan Eames	John Banas and Karen Altman	31 October 2001
Jo fights to help a young man when he lacks the strength to help himself.
332	38	"A Matter of Faith"	Riccardo Pellizzeri	Ysabella Dean	7 November 2001
Jo marvels at the human capacity for forgiveness when a faith healer is assaulted.
333	39	"Who Can You Trust?"	Fiona Banks	Caroline Stanton and Piers Hobson	11 November 2001
Jonesy risks Tess' trust when she suspects him of influencing a witness to suit his own prejudice.
334	40	"Best Eaten Cold"	Chris Langman	Tony Morphett	21 November 2001
Jonesy must reevaluate his place on the force when he learns the truth about his father's death.
335	41	"The Real Santa"	Steve Mann	Caroline Stanton	28 November 2001
Does Ben's hunger for the perfect Christmas place his children's happiness at risk?
336	42	"Dreaming of a White Christmas"	Roger Hodgman	Michaeley O'Brien	28 November 2001
It's Christmas and everyone celebrates it or avoids it in their own way.

== Weakest Link Special Episode ==
On 9 August 2001, a special episode of The Weakest Link featuring nine actors from the show went to air. The results were as follows:

	Main Rounds								Final Round
Round:	1	2	3	4	5	6	7	8	Final
Voted Out:	Peta; 5/9 Votes	Caroline^{1} 3/8 Votes	Paul; 4/7 Votes	Jane; 4/6 Votes	Suzi^{2} 2/5 Votes	Jeremy; 3/4 Votes	Ditch; 2/3 Votes	–	John (Winner); Neil (Runner-up)
Money Banked:	$7,500	$5,500	$3,500	$0	$3,200	$4,000	$1,200	$3,500 x 3	$35,400; TOTAL
Contestant	Votes								
John	Peta	Caroline	Paul	Jane	Suzi	Jeremy	Ditch	Won	
Neil	Peta	Caroline	Ditch	Jane	Suzi	Jeremy	Ditch	Lost	
Ditch	Peta	Jeremy	Paul	Jane	Jeremy	Jeremy	John		
Jeremy	Peta	Suzi	Paul	Jane	~~Neil~~; Suzi^{2}	John			
Suzi	Peta	Ditch	Jeremy	Jeremy	Jeremy				
Jane	Jeremy	Caroline	Paul	John					
Paul	Jeremy	Jeremy	John						
Caroline	Jane	Jeremy							
Peta	Jane								

- Note that the following are regarding the contestant, not the contestant the contestant votes against:

Red indicates the contestant was the weakest link
Lime indicates the contestant was the strongest link

^{1} Jeremy and Caroline tied with three votes each, but as Neil was the strongest link, he opted to vote Caroline off.

^{2} Jeremy and Suzi tied with two votes each, but as Jeremy was the strongest link, and could not vote himself off, he opted to vote Suzi off, though he originally voted for Neil who was not part of the tie.

Peta was first eliminated for not answering enough questions correctly. Caroline was next on a countback also for not answering enough questions correctly. Paul followed for being too big a threat to the team. Jane was voted out for not answering any questions correctly. Suzi was eliminated on a countback for not answering enough questions correctly. Jeremy was next also for not answering enough questions correctly. Ditch was voted out for not banking anything nor answering any questions correctly. In the end, John defeated Neil in the head-to-head round.

The final total won was $35,400, which John donated to the Red Cross Australia.

== DVD release ==
Similarly to the release of Blue Heelers' seventh season, the eighth season was also postponed due to the contractual negotiations. However, everything was finalised for a 1 October 2008 release. Like the seventh season, "The Complete Eight Season" will be released as a complete boxset.

The Complete Eighth Season: Part 1
Set details	Special features
22 episodes (970 mins.); Episodes 266-287; 6-disc set; Full frame; English (Dolby Digital 2.0 Stereo)	Photo gallery (12 pics)
Release dates	Photo gallery (12 pics)
Australia	Photo gallery (12 pics)
1 October 2008	Photo gallery (12 pics)

The Complete Eighth Season: Part 2
Set details	Special features
19 episodes (842 mins.); Episodes 288-306; 5-disc set; Full frame; English (Dolby Digital 2.0 Stereo)	Photo gallery (20 pics)
Release dates	Photo gallery (20 pics)
Australia	Photo gallery (20 pics)
1 October 2008	Photo gallery (20 pics)

The Complete Eighth Season
Set details	Special features
41 episodes (1812 mins.); Episodes 266-306; 11-disc set; Full frame; English (Dolby Digital 2.0 Stereo)	Photo gallery
Release dates	Photo gallery
Australia	Photo gallery
1 October 2008	Photo gallery
