= Blue Heelers season 7 =

Blue Heelers
- Season 7
- DVD covers for both parts
- Starring: Jane Allsop; Rupert Reid; Paul Bishop; Julie Nihill; Martin Sacks; Lisa McCune; John Wood
- No. of episodes: 41

Release
- Original network: Seven Network
- Original release: 9 February – 22 November 2000

Season chronology
- ← Previous; Season 6 Next → Season 8

The seventh season of the Australian police-drama Blue Heelers premiered on the Seven Network on 9 February 2000 and aired on Wednesday nights at 8:30 pm. The 41-episode season concluded 22 November 2000. The main cast was the same as the previous season except without Tasma Walton as Dash McKinley, and introducing Caroline Craig as Tess Gallagher. This season was released on DVD in a two part set on 31 July 2008.

== Casting ==
=== Main ===
- John Wood as Senior Sergeant Tom Croydon
- Julie Nihill as Chris Riley
- Martin Sacks as Senior Detective P. J. Hasham
- Lisa McCune as Senior Constable Maggie Doyle (episodes 1–2)
- Paul Bishop as Acting Sergeant / Senior Constable Ben Stewart (Note: Ben Stewart starts the season as Acting Sergeant but is demoted back to Senior Constable after the arrival of Tess Gallagher.)
- Rupert Reid as Constable Jack Lawson
- Jane Allsop as Constable Jo Parrish
- Caroline Craig as Sergeant Tess Gallagher (episodes 16–41)

=== Recurring cast ===
- Dennis Miller as Pat Doyle
- Terry Serio as Mick Doyle
- Mark Wilson as Benny Matthews
- Marcus Eyre as Detective Paul Donald
- Adam Palmer as Detective Doug Turnbull
- Neil Pigot as Inspector Russell Falcon-Price
- Peta Doodson as Inspector Monica Draper
- Suzi Dougherty as Dr. Mel Carter

=== Guest cast ===
- Paul Dawber
- Alan Hopgood
- Olivia Hamnett
- Kate Hood
- Ian Rawlings
- Andy Anderson
- Dennis Coard
- Roger Oakley
- Betty Lucas
- James Condon
- Alex Papps
- Mary Ward
- Tommy Dysart
- Maggie Kirkpatrick
- Joy Westmore
- Alyce Platt
- Jeremy Angerson
- Sean Scully
- Zoe Bertram
- Wendy Strehlow
- Reg Gorman
- Kane McNay
- Richard Morgan
- Frank Wilson
- Nicki Paull

== Plot ==
Maggie, aided by PJ and her brother Mick, arrived at the point of cracking the drug ring she had been pursuing for a year and realised that she would have to go into witness protection. To do so, she staged a breakup with PJ and then awaited her escort nervously. PJ, however, realised that she was being tricked and arrived just seconds too late, to see Maggie shot down by a mysterious assailant. The episodes that followed, the "Who Killed Maggie Doyle?" arc, were the most-watched episodes ever. Arrested for Maggie's murder, PJ looked desperately to prove that he was being framed. Ultimately, in episode 263 "Out of the Shadows", he discovered the truth - it was her brother Mick.

== Episodes ==
| No. overall | No. in season | Title | Directed by | Written by | Australian air date |
|---|---|---|---|---|---|
| 254 | 1 | "Loose Ends" | Grant Brown | John Banas | 9 February 2000 |
As Maggie gets closer to cracking the drug ring that killed her brother, her life is put in real danger.
| 255 | 2 | "One More Day" | Raymond Quint | Coral Drouyn | 16 February 2000 |
Maggie is on the brink of entering the safety of witness protection when her father is abducted and her plans are thrown into jeopardy. Final appearance of Senior Constable Maggie Doyle
| 256 | 3 | "Aftermath" | Graham Thorburn | Tony Morphett | 23 February 2000 |
As the other Heelers grieve, P.J. is determined to find the killer of Maggie Doyle.
| 257 | 4 | "Shadow of Doubt" | Grant Brown | Chris Phillips | 1 March 2000 |
All the evidence in the murder of Maggie Doyle points in one direction, P.J. Hasham.
| 258 | 5 | "A Chip off the Old Block" | Peter Sharp | Jon Stephens | 8 March 2000 |
Jack has a lot on his hands as he tries to protect his forgetful great grandfather from his failing years and some unsavoury new friends.
| 259 | 6 | "Code of Honour" | Fiona Banks | David Worthington | 15 March 2000 |
Tom's own "code of honour" is tested when a bikie gang comes to town with a vendetta.
| 260 | 7 | "Life Class" | Chris Langman | Karin Altman | 22 March 2000 |
Jo helps save a young girl from her charismatic art teacher, but is she out of moral danger?
| 261 | 8 | "Vanishing Act" | Raymond Quint | Cassandra Carter | 29 March 2000 |
All is not what it seems as Jack and P.J. investigate the case of the man who truly disappears after volunteering for a magician's vanishing act.
| 262 | 9 | "Unfinished Business" | Roger Hodgman | Bill Garner | 5 April 2000 |
P.J. gets closer and closer to nailing the identity of Maggie's killer when he gets information from a band of old rock and rollers.
| 263 | 10 | "Out of the Shadows" | Steve Mann | Jon Banas | 12 April 2000 |
P.J. finally discovers the identity of Maggie's killer - revealing an act of unimaginable betrayal.
| 264 | 11 | "Dance Crazy" | Chris Langman | David Allen | 19 April 2000 |
Jo and Ben team up to investigate the stalking of a local popular dance instructor.
| 265 | 12 | "Welcome Back" | Raymond Quint | Piers Hobson and David Allen | 26 April 2000 |
Tom reassesses his own life and the choices he has made when his old school friend arrives in Mount Thomas dripping with money and big city success.
| 266 | 13 | "Broken Windows" | Kevin Carlin | David Boutland and Peter Dick | 3 May 2000 |
Ben's and Jo's working relationship becomes strained when they enforce a zero tolerance policy in their dealings with vandalism and a group of street kids.
| 267 | 14 | "Something Fishy" | Roger Hodgman | Jon Stevens | 10 May 2000 |
Jack and Jo find themselves in a competition when they team up to solve a mystery of a switched fish and missing gold.
| 268 | 15 | "Dead For Quids" | Steve Mann | David Anthony | 17 May 2000 |
Tom and P.J. clash as they become embroiled in the case of an elderly woman whose death may have been hastened by her doctor.
| 269 | 16 | "On the Road" | Richard Jasek | Bill Garner | 24 May 2000 |
The new sergeant for Mount Thomas is announced. But is Ben the sure bet he thinks he is? First appearance of Sergeant Tess Gallagher
| 270 | 17 | "Lost and Found" | Chris Langman | Coral Drouyn | 31 May 2000 |
Tess' first job as new sergeant is to find a missing baby, but she also has to find a way to get on with the other Heelers - especially Ben.
| 271 | 18 | "Rank Outsider" | Kevin Carlin | David Worthington | 7 June 2000 |
A suspected greyhound ring-in puts pressure on the struggle between the old style country policing and the new approach brought by Sergeant Tess Gallagher.
| 272 | 19 | "Conduct Endangering Life" | Steve Mann | Chris Phillips | 14 June 2000 |
Jack, the son of a timber man, is the first to accuse a group of environmental protestors of a lethal practice of spiking logs at a local timber mill - but uncovering a dark family secret forces him to reassess his prejudices.
| 273 | 20 | "A Little Faith" | Esben Storm | Cassandra Carter | 21 June 2000 |
Will Ben risk the life of an unborn child to prove that a faith healer is a fraud?
| 274 | 21 | "The Gumshoe" | Kevin Carlin | David Allen | 28 June 2000 |
P.J.'s efforts to locate a missing backpacker are hampered by an over-enthusiastic private investigator.
| 275 | 22 | "Small Potatoes" | Chris Langman | Piers Hobson | 5 July 2000 |
Ben finds out more about Tess than she wants to reveal when she is forced to confront her childhood demons.
| 276 | 23 | "A Good Kid" | Grant Brown | John Stevens | 12 July 2000 |
Tess' message to Jo is clear - one more mistake, and you're out!
| 277 | 24 | "Fair Go" | Richard Jasek | Bill Garner | 19 July 2000 |
Jo's job and honour are on the line over a stolen cuckoo clock.
| 278 | 25 | "Cop it Sweet" | Declan Eames | Marieke Hardy | 26 July 2000 |
Jo finds her career under threat after she inadvertently lets a homicide suspect escape.
| 279 | 26 | "Moving On" | Richard jasek | Kelly Lefever | 2 August 2000 |
Ben's most terrifying nightmares come true as he races to prevent a young girl's suicide.
| 280 | 27 | "Bank on It" | Grant Brown | Chris Phillips | 9 August 2000 |
P.J. and Tess must put their personal differences aside and work as a team when confronted with an unusual bank robbery.
| 281 | 28 | "Hard Feelings" | Kelly Lefever | Peter Dick | 16 August 2000 |
Ben won't give up on a young offender who shows no remorse after committing a spate of serious crimes.
| 282 | 29 | "Running of the Rams" | Declan Eames | Tony Morphett | 23 August 2000 |
Tess learns a lesson about country policing when a group of locals plan to raise money for the CFA by running naked down the main street.
| 283 | 30 | "Tangled Web" | Roger Hodgman | Lyn Ogilvy | 30 August 2000 |
Ben puts his reputation at risk when he becomes emotionally involved in the lives of a woman and her son, who appear to be victims of domestic violence.
| 284 | 31 | "On Your Bike" | Raymond Quint | David Allen | 6 September 2000 |
Jack finds out that his girlfriend and an old mate have been exchanging love letters, throwing his future plans into chaos.
| 285 | 32 | "Stir Crazy" | Richard Sarell | Piers Hobson | 6 September 2000 |
A prison riot forces the Heelers to take custody of a group of violent criminals, putting Tess' leadership to the test.
| 286 | 33 | "Broken Promises (1)" | Steve Mann | Michael Winter | 4 October 2000 |
Jacks' trust in a friend leads him to be accused of involvement in a drug deal - testing the Heelers' allegiance
| 287 | 34 | "Broken Promises (2)" | Raymond Quint | Bill Garner | 4 October 2000 |
Jo and Tess put their lives on the line in a battle against the drug dealers responsible for shooting Jack.
| 288 | 35 | "Wheeling and Dealing" | Mike Smith | David Worthington | 11 October 2000 |
The Heelers realise Jack needs a little motivation while coming to terms with his injuries - and are happy to help out - in a most unexpected way.
| 289 | 36 | "Mind Over Matter" | Richard Sarell | Michael Brindley | 18 October 2000 |
Jack re-evaluates life in a wheelchair as he helps Clancey affirm his position in the community.
| 290 | 37 | "Paper Chase" | Graham Thorburn | Cassandra Carter | 25 October 2000 |
Jack is successfully adjusting to life in a wheelchair, making it hard for him to decide on a high risk operation which could result in him either regaining the use of his legs or make his condition worse.
| 291 | 38 | "Bully Boys" | Fiona Banks | Chris Phillips and David Allen | 1 November 2000 |
Jack puts his career in jeopardy when Tess finds him attempting to force a confession by roughing up a student at the school.
| 292 | 39 | "Bloodlines" | Declan Eames | Tony Morphett | 8 November 2000 |
Jo's actions during an investigation convince Jack to make a decision which drastically changes his life..
| 293 | 40 | "Ten Percent" | Richard Sarell | Michaeley O'Brien | 15 November 2000 |
Jack must come to grips with the shooting incident that put him in a wheelchair if he hopes to survive a standoff with an armed robber.
| 294 | 41 | "Leg Work" | Peter Sharp | David Allen | 22 November 2000 |
Jack may decide to force a risky spine operation as a last resort to keep his job at Mount Thomas.

== DVD release ==
Due to contractual negotiations, the release of this season, as well as any proceeding seasons, was postponed. These negotiations have concluded and the "Complete Seventh Season" DVD set (parts one and two) was released for sale in Australia (Region 4) on 31 July 2008. The seventh season was released, as its predecessors were, in two parts. However, this season was simply released in a standard DVD package, not a boxed set with slipcase packaging like its predecessors. It is expected to be released as a complete package sometime in the future.

The Complete Seventh Season: Part 1
| Set Details | Special Features |
| 22 Episodes (974 Mins.); Episodes 224 - 253; 6-Disc Set; Full Frame; English (Dolby Digital 2.0 Stereo) | Photo Gallery (20 Pics) |
| Release Dates | Photo Gallery (20 Pics) |
| Australia | Photo Gallery (20 Pics) |
| 31 July 2008 | Photo Gallery (20 Pics) |

The Complete Seventh Season: Part 2
| Set Details | Special Features |
| 20 Episodes (881 Mins.); Episodes 254 - 265; 5-Disc Set; Full Frame; English (Dolby Digital 2.0 Stereo) | Photo Gallery |
| Release Dates | Photo Gallery |
| Australia | Photo Gallery |
| 31 July 2008 | Photo Gallery |
