= Jack Lawson (Blue Heelers) =

- Blue Heelers character
- First appearance: "Dancing with the Devil"; 10 February 1999
- Last appearance: "Falling"; 20 June 2001
- Portrayed by: Rupert Reid

In-universe information
- Occupation: Police constable
- Significant other: Molly Malloy
- Relatives: Brenda Lawson (mother); Craig Ryan (cousin)

Jack Lawson is a fictional character from the Australian police drama Blue Heelers, played by Rupert Reid. Reid joined the cast in September 1998 and he relocated to Melbourne for filming. To prepare for the role, he spent time with the Victoria Police. He made his first appearance in the sixth season episode "Dancing with the Devil", broadcast on 10 February 1999.

== Casting ==
Reid had been out of work for several months since leaving his role in Heartbreak High when he was cast as Jack in September 1998. He called the role a "dream come true." Reid had to relocate from Sydney to Melbourne for the part, and he was contracted for three years. In preparation for filming, he spent time with the Victoria Police. He told Marina Williams of TV Week that he "watched, listened and talked to them, but mostly listened." He found the workload to be one of the hardest things to cope with, along with getting into character and finding the rhythm of the show.

== Development ==
Reid wanted to keep his character "positive" and not have him turn into a cynic. He said Jack was growing up and "coming of age." He described him as someone "who sees beauty and also sees things that aren't beautiful, and that does make him confused and question his own actions." There were a number of similarities between Reid and Jack, including their "easygoing" personas, their love for the outdoors and that both of them relocated for their jobs. A TV Week writer called Jack "brash" and "laconic".

Following his introduction, it is established that Jack left his "sweetheart" Molly Malloy back in his home town of Swiss Creek. Producers later cast Petra Yared as Molly. Following months of separation, Jack brings Molly to town, and a TV Week columnist noted that it is soon apparent that their reunion "is not going to be an easy one." While Jack appears to be in love with Molly, she shows an indifference to their relationship and even flirts with some deer hunters. Molly's visit "becomes uneasy" and Jack's cousin Craig (Nick Barkla) eventually admits that they have had an affair. After Craig fails to return from a camping trip, Jack finds his cabin "peppered" with bullet holes. However, he soon becomes a suspect in Craig's disappearance and has to prove his innocence. The TV Week columnist quipped "The one person he thought he could trust is betraying him, and declaring that Mt Thomas' good guy has a dark side."

Following the introduction of Jo Parrish (Jane Allsop), Jack develops a "big crush" on her. Reid said that his character "likes her immediately", but he is also "a bit indignant" as he is trying to convince people not to see him as a young child. He admitted that he was not sure if Jack and Jo would be the new P. J. (Martin Sacks) and Maggie (Lisa McCune), who had become the show's most popular couple, but added "with the nature of two young people in a confined place, sparks are bound to fly!"

Jack plays a large part in the show's 250th episode, broadcast on 3 November 1999, as he tries to save Molly's life after she becomes trapped inside a bus that crashed while trying to avoid a police chase. Molly had been returning to Mount Thomas in an attempt to reconcile with Jack, following their separation months before. Reid felt "honoured" that his character was involved in the milestone episode, especially after he had just celebrated his first year with the show. He stated "It was nice that they made the 250th episode such a big 'Jack story'. I feel like it is a nice show of faith in my abilities, and I feel very much a part of this amazing warhorse we call Blue Heelers."

In a late 2000 storyline, Jack is shot while on duty and has to use a wheelchair for some time. In order to understand his character's mindset, Reid spent time with several paraplegics, including a police officer who was shot in similar circumstances to Jack. He also attended a paraplegic support group and took part in a game of wheelchair basketball with the Australian Paralympic men's basketball team to prepare for the storyline, which he described as "a sobering experience." On-screen, Jack makes the decision to sell his "beloved" horse Matilda. Reid explained that the moment is "a really big thing for Jack. He's in a wheelchair, it doesn't look like he's going to get to ride a horse again – and he really doesn't want to be reminded of his old self. Matilda is such an important side of Jack, but he can't really manage a horse." Jack meets a man who is into horses and can provide all the care Matilda needs, so he decides to sell her to him. Erin Craven of TV Week thought that some viewers would see it as a sign that Jack is giving up hope of walking again, but Reid reckoned it was more of Jack being practical. Craven also pointed out that choosing to sell Matilda is one of the hardest things the character has ever faced, but the "frustration" of being in a wheelchair was what was really getting to Jack. Reid stated "He doesn't want people to feel sorry for him. There are a lot of people who treat Jack like an invalid, so it's really frustrating for him. He's so annoyed by the way other people react to him." The storyline also changes the relationship between Jack and Jo, as they become closer. Reid refused to reveal whether the pair would begin a romance, adding that Jack's relationship with everyone in Mt Thomas changes.

The following year, producers created a romance storyline between Jack and fellow officer Tess Gallagher (Caroline Craig). The pair were shown to be attracted to one another, but their relationship does not develop until they are both held hostage, which allows them to admit their feelings. Reid explained that neither Jack or Tess know if they are going to survive their ordeal and there is a lot of unsaid stuff between them. He continued: "They realise that their number could be up. There's a lot of feeling between the two of them and a lot of emotionally loaded words. The danger of this situation really cuts through to the emotional truth of how much they really care for each other." For Tess, Craig said that she has never had anyone care about her like Jack does, but she also does not want to jeopardise her career. Being in a relationship with a junior constable "is a bad move". Craig also said Tess does not want people knowing, which Jack finds hard to understand. However, Reid said he understood Tess's dilemma, despite his character's view. Jack "oversteps the mark a couple of times" and Reid explained that Jack feels like the goalposts keeping moving. One day they are Tess and Jack and the next its sergeant and constable.

The Jack and Tess romance was compared to the show's "favourite couple" Maggie and PJ, who had a similar situation at the start of their long-running relationship arc. They also gave into their feelings during a life or death storyline. Reid acknowledged the comparisons to Maggie and PJ, but did not think Jack and Tess were the next Maggie and PJ as they had very distinct personalities and storylines. He also pointed out that there is an age gap between Jack and Tess, so there was a different dynamic between them. Both Reid and Craig enjoyed the storyline, but found it challenging, especially Craig who was not a fan of the kissing scenes. However, she and Reid had been friends for a number of years and she thought it would have been worse if she performed those scenes with someone she was not comfortable with.

== Storylines ==
Jack arrives in Mount Thomas with his horse Matilda, who appears frequently on the show. Jack is riding in the bush when he discovers the body of fellow police member Constable Greg Mason (Matthew Green). Jack was 19 when he first arrived in Mount Thomas and was still completing his policing degree.

Jack left his girlfriend Molly (Petra Yared) behind in his hometown, the young lovers having promised each other to wait to consummate their relationship until marriage. But when she visits him in Mount Thomas, she reveals that she has had an affair with Jack's cousin, Craig Ryan (Nick Barkla), and he breaks off their relationship. Molly is impaled during a bus accident and dies of her injuries. After her death, Jack admits that he had lied to her about his feelings.

Jack joins the Mount Thomas footy team, the Mudlarks. He befriends his teammates Matt Waldron (Fletcher Humphrys) and Scotty Foster (Jeremy Angerson). Matt is diagnosed with terminal brain cancer, and Scotty goes to jail for manslaughter of another teammate. Matt marries his girlfriend Letty Brown (Verity McIntyre), who gives birth to his son, Matty Jr (Derryn Mullan), before he dies. Jack eventually falls in love with Letty. He loses his virginity to her and moves into her house. The relationship falls apart when Scotty is released from prison, and Letty realises she is in love with him 'in a different way'.

Jack is accused of corruption by D.S. Bernie O'Halloran (Robert Mammone) after a stakeout fails to intercept a drug shipment into Mount Thomas. In order to clear his name, Jack investigates and realises his friend Jamie Mitchell (Simon Gleeson) set him up. Jamie tries to bribe Jack into looking the other way, but Jack refuses and Jamie shoots him. The bullet lodges too close to his spinal cord to operate, leaving Jack in a wheelchair for some months. His mother Brenda Lawson (Zoe Bertram) comes to take care of him. Jack is very depressed during this time and sells his horse Matilda to a passing rodeo. After a suspect in a wheelchair is convicted of burglary, and Inspector Falcon-Price (Neil Pigot) orders Jack to be put on restricted duties at St. Davids, Jack convinces his specialist to operate, despite being given only a 5% chance of success. The operation is a success and Jack is able to walk again.

Jack begins a relationship with Tess Gallagher (Craig). But the shooting leaves him with a lot of resentment towards people who deal with drugs. After he lets suspected drug manufacturer Bradley Eckhart (Richard Cawthorne) fall to his death, Jack is sent to prison for manslaughter.

== Reception ==
Gordon Farrer of The Age was critical of Reid's early episodes, writing that he "seems to struggle in his role even when the writing is top-notch." His colleague Simon Hughes said that despite it being early days, neither Jack or Ben Stewart (Paul Bishop) could "hold a candle to their predecessors" Wayne Patterson (Grant Bowler) and Nick Schultz (Williams McInnes). He added "who can be bothered with the marital baggage with which one has arrived or the adolescent sex life of the other?" Fellow Age critic Brian Courtis noted some "particularly interesting vibes" between Jack and the newly introduced Jo Parrish (Jane Allsop). In May 1999, Sue Williams of The Sydney Morning Herald named Reid as one of the "next big stars" due to his role as Jack. She said he "won the attention of viewers, not to mention a few magazine covers."
