= Blue Heelers season 6 =

Blue Heelers
- Season 6
- DVD cover for the first part
- No. of episodes: 42

Release
- Original network: Seven Network
- Original release: 10 February – 24 November 1999

Season chronology
- ← Previous; Season 5 Next → Season 7

The sixth season of the Australian police-drama Blue Heelers premiered on the Seven Network on 10 February 1999 and aired on Wednesday evenings at 8:30 PM. The 42-episode season concluded on 24 November 1999. The main cast was mostly the same as the previous season with the departure of William McInnes as Nick Schultz and Damian Walshe-Howling as Adam Cooper, and the introductions of Rupert Reid as Jack Lawson and Jane Allsop as Jo Parrish, the latter having previously guest starred in season 4 episode "Fool for Love". As with previous seasons, the sixth season was released on DVD as both a two part and complete set, both on 10 August 2006.

== Casting ==
=== Main ===
- John Wood as Senior Sergeant Tom Croydon
- Julie Nihill as Chris Riley
- Martin Sacks as Senior Detective P.J. Hasham
- Lisa McCune as Acting Sergeant / Senior Constable Maggie Doyle (Note: Maggie Doyle was absent between episodes 224 and 229. Upon her return, she requested not to be reappointed as Acting Sergeant.)
- Tasma Walton as Constable Dash McKinley (episodes 1–23)
- Paul Bishop as Senior Constable / Acting Sergeant Ben Stewart
- Rupert Reid as Probationary Constable Jack Lawson
- Jane Allsop as Probationary Constable Jo Parrish (episodes 28–42)

=== Guest stars ===
- Kate Hood
- Jason Clarke
- Terence Donovan
- Lisa Crittenden
- Grant Piro
- Norman Yemm
- Robert Grubb
- Margot Knight
- Arianthe Galani
- Jeremy Angerson
- Louise Siversen
- Lois Ramsay
- Mary Ward
- Nancye Hayes
- Roger Oakley.

== Episodes ==
No. overall	No. in season	Title	Directed by	Written by	Australian air date
212	1	"Dancing with the Devil (1)"	Robert Klenner	Bill Garner	10 February 1999
A masked serial rapist is on the loose in Mount Thomas and the Heelers have their work cut out trying to find out the offender's identity and Constable Jack Lawson makes his entrance into the station. First appearance of Constable Jack Lawson
213	2	"Dancing with the Devil (2)"	Kevin Carlin	Harry Jordan	17 February 1999
Maggie is attacked by the masked rapist and a mother tries to take the law into her own hands
214	3	"Winning at all Costs"	Esben Storm	Beverley Evans	24 February 1999
Dash's brother returns to Mount Thomas with a few skeletons in his closet He is accused of having sex with a student and his car and he are attacked. Dash believes he is innocent.
215	4	"Love is a Drug"	Steve Mann	Dave Worthington	3 March 1999
Maggie and P.J. stifle evidence when a videotape of a lovers tiff captures them canoodling at Govet's Leap.
216	5	"An Eye for an Eye"	Steve Mann	Tony Morphett	10 March 1999
Jack and Dash witness a double fatality involving two popular young locals. Chris faces voter backlash, and Jack involves Maggie in a hunch without telling her. In the end someone ends up dead when the truth comes out.
217	6	"Wishful Thinking"	Richard Jasek	Jenny Lewis	17 March 1999
Ben's kids try to "hook up" Maggie and Ben.
218	7	"Pillow Talk"	Karl Steinberg	Mary Graham	24 March 1999
Tom, and Sally clash after a vicious attack on an elderly woman and the offender brings P.J. to boiling point after threatening Maggie.
219	8	"The Good Weed"	Fiona Banks	Cassandra Carter	31 March 1999
Tom is caught between a rock and a hard place and Chris ends up violently sick in hospital.
220	9	"By the Book"	Kevin Carlin	David Allen	7 April 1999
Jack finds himself in hot water when an ex criminal accuses him of attempted murder. To make things worse, Falcon-Price comes in to investigate.
221	10	"Dirty Money"	Richard Jasek	Dave Marsh	14 April 1999
Maggie does everything in her power to bring down the drug ring that killed her brother and her life is turned upside down when her family becomes embroiled in the drug ring.
222	11	"Married to the Job"	Faith Martin	Beverley Evans and Kelly Levefer	21 April 1999
Ben gives Maggie information, which puts her in danger and risks losing his children when well-meaning decisions turn to disaster.
223	12	"Web of Lies"	Raymond Quint	Roger Dunn and Dave Worthington	28 April 1999
P.J confronts his worst fears when the Heelers discover Maggie's missing car in flames and a charred body inside. Maggie's heartbreaking decision pushes P.J to the edge.
224	13	"End of the Road"	Pino Amenta	Brian Bell and John Banas	5 May 1999
Jack jumps the divide between duty and friendship when two mates become murder suspects.
225	14	"Lies and Whispers"	Chris Langman	Cassandra Carter	12 May 1999
Dash's promotion to trainee detective turns sour when she learns that her mentor, Inspector Monica Draper could have amorous intentions only to find out her mistake and learns not to make assumptions.
226	15	"Jack of Hearts"	Fiona Banks	Bob Cameron	19 May 1999
Jack becomes the reluctant rescuer in a lovelorn schoolgirl's dangerous game to win his affection.
227	16	"The Grace of God"	Grant Brown	Jenny Lewis	26 May 1999
One Heeler dead, the killer is loose, he's desperate and Tom is on his doorstep.
228	17	"The Stag"	Declan Eames	Bill Garner	2 June 1999
Jack is in the line of fire when he seems to have resolved the problems of the heart through the barrel of a gun.
229	18	"The Good Life"	Chris Langman	Harry Jordan	9 June 1999
Ben's investigation of a livestock plague unravels Robyn's new life in Mount Thomas.
230	19	"Perfect Match"	Fiona Banks	Deborah Parsons	16 June 1999
P.J. feels rejected when Ben and Maggie help a dying child whose parents are in trouble.
231	20	"Oil and Water"	Grant Brown	Lyn Ogilvy	23 June 1999
Tom and Sally's relationship goes on trial when Sally defends a drink driver responsible for the death of Tom's friend.
232	21	"Smoke gets in your Eyes"	Declan Eames	David Allen	30 June 1999
Maggie appeals for her life when a martyr to a cause threatens to kill them both in a publicity stunt.
233	22	"King of the Kids"	Chris Langman	Jenny Lewis	7 July 1999
Dash places an abused boy's life in danger when she tries to help the maverick social worker who is protecting him.
234	23	"Full Circle"	Kevin Carlin	Dave Worthington	14 July 1999
Dash's excitement at becoming a detective ends in despair and a life changing decision, after her mother is killed in a car accident. She leaves after that. Final appearance of Constable Deirdre McKinley
235	24	"Behind the Badge"	Fiona Banks	Piers Hobson	21 July 1999
Maggie and Chris confront death and despair when they fall victim to an armed bandit.
236	25	"The Angel Cruise"	Richard Jasek	Peter Dick	28 July 1999
A cash strapped Ben is seduced into a dodgy pyramid scheme that divides the Heelers and the town in a contest of winners and losers.
237	26	"Downsizing"	Richard Sarell	Dave Marsh	4 August 1999
Tom battles town panic because not only does the station appear under threat but with the bank closing, Mount Thomas seems set for financial ruin.
238	27	"The Deepest Cut"	Kevin Carlin	Emma Honey and Peter Dick	11 August 1999
Ben finds himself in the midst of gay slurs and murder accusations when his hairdresser friend is found dead.
239	28	"Hello-Goodbye"	Karl Steinberg	Ysabelle Dean	18 August 1999
Trouble magnet, Constable Jo Parrish arrives at Mount Thomas police station provoking both a civil suit and a stalker. First appearance of Constable Jo Parrish
240	29	"Whip Crack-Away"	Richard jasek	Tony Morphett	25 August 1999
Jo oversteps the line when she protects a charming gypsy who operates on the wrong side of the law.
241	30	"Price of Silence"	Richard Sarell	Cassandra Carter	1 September 1999
Maggie threatens her career when she is groped by a pro police politician on campaign and charges him with indecent assault.
242	31	"Without Judgment"	Roger Hodgman	Geraldine Pilkington	8 September 1999
A missing man, a passionate kiss, and a family secret exposed force Maggie to a decision about her confused love life.
243	32	"Smoke Without Fire"	Kevin Carlin	David Allen	15 September 1999
The town pushes for Tom's resignation when a corrupt colleague with a personal grudge tries to bring him down.
244	33	"Starry Starry Night"	Declan Eames	John Banas	22 September 1999
A mystery unfolds on night patrol when Jack and Jo stumble across a troubled stranger who carries a message for the Heelers that they won't forget.
245	34	"Paradise Lost"	Richard Sarell	Bill Garner	29 September 1999
P.J. fears he is losing ground when Ben and Maggie are drawn into an alternative community called Paradise.
246	35	"The Game"	Julian McSwiney	Dave March	6 October 1999
It's Grand Final week and the pressure is on Jack and finds it hard to focus on work with footy fever upon him. At the same time he has to deal with Marnie Sommer's constant petty crimes. And coach of the Mudlarks Ian Waldron is kidnapped by the St Davids team. On top of all this, Marnie's husband returns to Mount Thomas fresh out of prison and holds up Marnie at gunpoint, demanding the loot from the armed robbery.
247	36	"Miracle at Rabbit Creek"	Kevin Carlin	Tony Morphett	13 October 1999
Tom pursues a local trouble maker who veers off the road into a tree at high speed. Devastated, he prays to God to absolve Tim Sullivan of his sins. Ten minutes later, after the ambulance arrives he sits upright! After jokes at Tom's expense, Inspector Falcon Price wants to know if Tom is blessed and Tom and Maggie question their faith. P.J remains the station cynic until his mother who is terminally ill, arrives. Tim, feeling his life is a freak show after being ridiculed mercilessly and pressed by his mother to reform, runs away and Tom goes to search for him. someone has planted a bomb in Rabbit Creek and visitors to the Creek will be killed in 5 minutes, Tim is the hero by tossing it into the creek where it explodes harmlessly.
248	37	"Second Chance"	Steve Mann	David Boutland	20 October 1999
P.J. kills Jo's new romance when he reveals her boyfriend is a murderer with vengeance on his mind.
249	38	"The Price of Friendship"	Richard Sarell	Karin Altmann	27 October 1999
Jack is in strife when he places a wayward friendship before duty and endangers three lives.
250	39	"Under Fire"	Raymond Quint	Peter Dick	3 November 1999
Ben and Maggie crash chasing a suspect which leads to a bus crashing. Jack's ex-girlfriend is trapped in the bus, along with a consignment of volatile chemicals.
251	40	"Fifty-Fifty"	Peter Sharp	Lyn Ogilvy	10 November 1999
Ben is compromised by a despairing teenager who pleas for shelter from her feuding parents.
252	41	"Kids"	Steve Mann	Deborah Parsons	17 November 1999
Ben won't believe that his daughter Emma has burgled an old lady.
253	42	"Be Prepared"	Steve Mann	Bill Garner	24 November 1999
Jack saves a local from a mantrap and meets a family of Y2K survivalists.

== DVD release ==
The Complete Sixth Season: Part 1
Set Details	Special Features
24 Episodes (1080 Mins.); Episodes 182–205; 6-Disc Set; Full Frame; English (Dolby Digital 2.0 Stereo)	Slipcase Packaging; Photo Gallery (7 Pics)
Release Dates	Slipcase Packaging; Photo Gallery (7 Pics)
Australia	Slipcase Packaging; Photo Gallery (7 Pics)
10 August 2006	Slipcase Packaging; Photo Gallery (7 Pics)

The Complete Sixth Season: Part 2
Set Details	Special Features
20 Episodes (810 Mins.); Episodes 206–223; 5-Disc Set; Full Frame; English (Dolby Digital 2.0 Stereo)	Slipcase Packaging; Photo Gallery (12 Pics)
Release Dates	Slipcase Packaging; Photo Gallery (12 Pics)
Australia	Slipcase Packaging; Photo Gallery (12 Pics)
10 August 2006	Slipcase Packaging; Photo Gallery (12 Pics)

The Complete Sixth Season
Set Details	Special Features
44 Episodes (1890 Mins.); Episodes 182–223; 11-Disc Set; Full Frame; English (Dolby Digital 2.0 Stereo)	Slipcase Packaging; Photo Gallery
Release Dates	Slipcase Packaging; Photo Gallery
Australia	Slipcase Packaging; Photo Gallery
10 August 2006	Slipcase Packaging; Photo Gallery
