= Jo Parrish =

- Blue Heelers character
- First appearance: "Hello Goodbye"; 18 August 1999
- Last appearance: "End Of Innocence"; 6 July 2004
- Portrayed by: Jane Allsop

In-universe information
- Occupation: Constable; Senior Constable
- Family: Bev Parrish (mother); Jeff Parrish (father)

Jo Parrish is a fictional character from the Australian television police drama Blue Heelers, played by Jane Allsop. She made her first appearance during the sixth season episode "Hello Goodbye", broadcast on 18 August 1999. The character left in the eleventh season on 6 July 2004, after being killed in an explosion. She was the seventh longest serving character behind Tom Croydon, Chris Riley, P.J. Hasham, Ben Stewart, Maggie Doyle and Nick Schultz

== Casting ==
Jane Allsop auditioned for the role of Dash McKinley in 1995, but the role was given to Tasma Walton. She made a guest appearance in the series a year later. In 1999, Allsop was cast as Jo, Dash's replacement following Walton's decision to leave the series. Allsop spent a number of weeks carrying out research for the role, which included visits to the Victoria Police Academy and police stations in St Kilda and Shepparton.

== Development ==
Jo is a police constable from the city who transfers to Mount Thomas. Jo is described as "the type of person who only opens her mouth to change feet" and she has earned the nickname "Perish Parrish". She quickly gains the ire of Ben Stewart (Paul Bishop), and the friendship and affection of Constable Jack Lawson (Rupert Reid). The character's first day on the job is marred by a civil action brought against her by a shoplifter, who accuses her of assault and false arrest. An internal inquiry is also launched against her, as there is doubt about whether she used correct police procedure. Senior Sergeant Tom Croydon (John Wood) is left "even more dismayed" when Jo messes up the staff lunches and strikes his car. A Sydney Morning Herald reporter commented that it was "an inauspicious introduction to Mount Thomas" for the character and thought things would get worse before getting better for her.

== Storylines ==
Jo is initially portrayed as a very stubborn and sometimes even pig-headed young woman. She does, however, mature over the course of the series. She is good friends with Constable Jack Lawson and his replacement, Constable Evan Jones (Ditch Davey). She also gets on well with Senior Constable Maggie Doyle (Lisa McCune) before Maggie is shot dead. Jo initially dislikes the new sergeant who arrives after Maggie's death, Tess Gallagher (Caroline Craig), however, the two later become friends. Jo is later promoted to Senior Constable. Jo has a relationship with P. J. Hasham (Martin Sacks), who she becomes engaged to. The relationship ends when Jo feels that P. J. will not get over the death of his former fiancée, Maggie. She plans on leaving Mount Thomas because she felt it was too painful to work with P.J after their break-up however she is killed alongside Clancy Freeman (Michael Isaacs) when the Mount Thomas station is bombed.

== Reception ==
For her portrayal of Jo, Allsop won the Logie Award for Most Popular New Female Talent in 2000. She was nominated in the Most Popular Actress category in 2005.

A reporter for The Sydney Morning Herald observed that Allsop's casting as Jo helped to "fill the rebel-without-a-clue void" left by Walton's departure.
