= Slate, Wyn & Me =

- Directed by: Don McLennan
- Produced by: Tom Burstall
- Starring: Sigrid Thornton; Martin Sacks; Simon Burke
- Cinematography: David Connell
- Edited by: Zbigniew Friedrich
- Distributed by: Filmpac Distribution
- Release date: 1987
- Running time: 87 minutes
- Country: Australia
- Language: English
- Budget: A$2,362,038
- Box office: A$13,478 (Australia)

Slate, Wyn and Me is a 1987 Australian film directed by Don McLennan and starring Sigrid Thornton, Simon Burke, and Martin Sacks.,

== Premise ==
A small town school teacher witnesses the murder of a policeman by a criminal, Wyn, and is kidnapped by him and his brother, Slate.

== Production ==
The film was shot over 8 weeks.

== Awards ==
The movie was nominated for The Best Screenplay, Adapted. In 1987

== Cast ==
- Sigrid Thornton as Blanche McBride
- Simon Burke as Wyn Jackson
- Martin Sacks as Slate Jackson
- Tommy Lewis as Morgan
- Lesley Baker as Molly
- Harold Baigent as Sammy
- Michelle Torres as Daphne
- Murray Fahey as Martin
- Taya Straton as Pippa
- Julia MacDougall as Del Downer
- Peter Cummins as Old Man Downer
- Reg Gorman as Wilkinson
- Warren Owens as Tommy
- Eric McPhan as Policeman
- Simon Westaway as Policeman
- Kurt Von Schneider as Truck Driver
