= Kate Hood =

Australian actress

- Born: 1958 or 1959 (age 67–68); Sydney, New South Wales, Australia
- Occupations: Actress, writer, director
- Years active: 1981−present
- Notable work: Prisoner (1986)

Kate Hood (born 1958 or 1959) is an Australian actress, born in Sydney. She studied drama in New Zealand and joined The Mercury Theatre

She is best known to international audiences for her role in the cult television drama Prisoner as the misunderstood Kath Maxwell during the final year of the series.

She also played Jill Fowley on three episodes of Blue Heelers during its sixth season, and is the voice behind many TAC commercials. She had a part in the Jodie Foster film Mesmerized.

In 2003, Hood was diagnosed with HSP (hereditary spastic paraplegia). She is a wheelchair user. Hood said of the diagnosis that she underwent two years of unsuccessful treatment with a chiropractor before seeing a neurologist.

In 2023, Hood was added to an advisory board of the Melbourne Theatre Company.

== Other activities ==
Hood is the director of Raspberry Ripple Productions, a production company that focuses on helping disabled actors work with people like themselves on stage.

Hood is an advocate for disability awareness in the arts sector.

== Filmography ==
=== Film ===
Year	Title	Role	Notes
1984	Constance	Library Assistant	
1986	Mesmerized	Midwife	Feature film
1988	Takeover	Nurse	Television film
1993	The Flood: Who Will Save Our Children?	Mrs. Bowman	Television film

=== Television ===
Year	Title	Role	Notes
1986	Prisoner	Kath Maxwell	Season 8 (84 episodes)
1999–2000	Blue Heelers	Jill Fowler, Rita Hammond	Season 6 (3 episodes)
2016–17	Neighbours	Maxine Cowper	Season 32−33 (4 episodes)
2022	Talking Prisoner	Self	Podcast series 1 episode

== Theatre ==
Hood has appeared in numerous theatre productions. In 2023, Hood appeared in the play Escape Alone. In 2024, Hood appeared in Cost of Living during the Queensland season of the production.

Year	Title	Role	Notes	Ref
2024	Cost of Living	Ani	Queensland Theatre Co	
2024	Peacemongers			
2023	Escape Alone	Lena	Southbank Theatre	
2023	Risky Business		Director / Geelong Theatre Co	
