= Mesmerized (film) =

1985 drama film

- Video release poster
- Directed by: Michael Laughlin
- Screenplay by: Michael Laughlin
- Story by: Jerzy Skolimowski
- Produced by: Antony I. Ginnane
- Starring: Jodie Foster; John Lithgow; Michael Murphy
- Cinematography: Louis Horvath
- Edited by: Petra von Oelffen
- Music by: Georges Delerue
- Production companies: RKO Pictures; Challenge Corporate Services; Orinward; Camperdown
- Distributed by: Thorn EMI Screen Entertainment (Australia); Cannon Home Video (UK); Vestron Pictures (US)
- Release dates: November 18, 1985 (United Kingdom); December 31, 1986 (United States)
- Running time: 97 minutes
- Countries: Australia; United Kingdom; New Zealand; United States
- Language: English
- Budget: $4.2 million

Mesmerized (also known as Shocked and My Letter to George) is a 1985 drama film directed by Michael Laughlin and starring Jodie Foster, John Lithgow and Michael Murphy.

Loosely based upon the Pimlico mystery, the film was a co-production between Australia, New Zealand, United Kingdom and United States with RKO Pictures. The film was titled Mesmerized during production and upon release in Australia, New Zealand, and the UK. It was released in the US in 1986 as My Letter to George, and elsewhere as Shocked.

== Plot ==
An orphaned 18-year-old New Zealand girl marries a much older wealthy businessman. Strains soon develop between them, at great emotional and physical toll on them and those around them, from family and servants to business and trade associates and clientele.

She proceeds to cultivate a game with him in which she reads to him and also hypnotizes him. While he is under hypnosis, she feeds him chloroform, thus gradually poisoning him. He finally dies and she is arrested and accused of poisoning him. Although chloroform is found in his stomach, there is no proof that she was involved, so she is acquitted. She then leaves New Zealand with his brother George, whom she loves.

The film ends by stating that her story was "based on a real character, crime and trial" and that it was assumed that they had emigrated to America to begin a new life. She was 19 years old.

== Cast ==
- Jodie Foster – Victoria Thompson
- John Lithgow – Oliver Thompson
- Michael Murphy – Reverend Wilson
- Dan Shor – George Thompson
- Harry Andrews – Old Thompson
- Philip Holder – Dr. Finch
- Beryl Te Wiata – Mrs. Simmons
- Reg Evans – Mr. Simmons
- Jonathan Hardy – Burley
- Don Selwyn – Joseph
- Derek Hardwick – Longwood
- George Spoors – Lawyer
- Bob Gould – Judge
- Jonathan Elsom – Public Prosecutor
- Norman Fairley – Bailiff
- Kate Hood – Midwife
- Sarah Peirse – Victoria's mother
