= Blue Heelers =

1994–2006 Australian police drama series

- Also known as: Boys in Blue (working title)
- Genre: Drama
- Created by: Tony Morphett; Hal McElroy
- Starring: John Wood; Julie Nihill; William McInnes; Lisa McCune; Martin Sacks; Grant Bowler; Ann Burbrook; Damian Walshe-Howling
- Composers: Garry Hardman; Red Symons; Michael Atkinson
- Country of origin: Australia
- Original language: English
- No. of seasons: 13
- No. of episodes: 510 (list of episodes)

Production
- Executive producer: Riccardo Pellizzeri
- Camera setup: Video (1994–2002); HD video (filmized) (2003–2006)
- Running time: 45 minutes
- Production companies: Southern Star; 7 Network

Original release
- Network: Seven Network
- Release: 18 January 1994 – 4 June 2006

Blue Heelers is an Australian police drama series that was produced by Southern Star Group and ran for twelve years on the Seven Network, from 1994 to 2006. Although based around the policing of the town, the series generally depicted the everyday lives and relationships of the residents of Mount Thomas, a fictional small town in Victoria.

The series was one of the highest-rated and most-awarded programs in the history of Australian television, having won 25 Logie awards, and having equal standing with The Don Lane Show as the most awarded show in the history of the Logies (with five wins). It is also noted for its two main stars Lisa McCune, a four-time recipient of the Gold Logie, and John Wood, who also won Gold.

== Overview ==
Blue Heelers was first aired on 18 January 1994, with the episode "A Woman's Place". The last episode, episode #510 titled "One Day More" aired on 4 June 2006. The series was produced by Southern Star Group for the Seven Network. During its 13-season run it won a total of 32 awards and was nominated for a further 50. This included 25 Logie Awards, five of which were the Gold Logie, the most coveted television award in Australia.

As well as everyday policing matters, the series deals with many controversial and "touchy" subjects. The series was the first to examine the stressful world of young police officers who are "thrown into the deep end where they are left to sink or swim".

Police procedurals were enormously popular in Australia in the 1960s and 1970s, but by the 1980s they had been replaced by home-grown soap operas and mini-series, like Neighbours and Home and Away.

Blue Heelers, however, was Australia's most popular television drama while it lasted. The series drew more than 2.5 million viewers every week at its peak. Along with the long-running Crawford Productions series Homicide, Blue Heelers holds the Australian record for most episodes produced of a weekly prime-time drama. It was also nearly the longest-running series, but Homicide lasted one calendar month longer and, due to five feature-length episodes, had more time on air.

Blue Heelers was sold to 108 territories and gained international recognition in the UK, Ireland, New Zealand, Canada and other countries.

The series launched the careers of many Australian actors, such as Lisa McCune, Grant Bowler, Ditch Davey, Rachel Gordon, Tasma Walton, Charlie Clausen and Jane Allsop. While many of these actors are still best known for their work on Blue Heelers, some have gone on to bigger roles. Many other actors of today also appeared in guest roles, including Hugh Jackman, Charles 'Bud' Tingwell, Peter O'Brien, John Howard and Robert Rabiah.

John Wood, alongside Julie Nihill remained the only actors with Blue Heelers to remain during its entire 12-year run, portraying Senior Sergeant Tom Croydon and publican Chris Riley respectively.

== Plot ==
P.J. Hasham, Tom Croydon and Maggie Doyle

The series primarily focuses on the daily lives of police officers working at a police station in the fictional small town of Mount Thomas in the Australian state of Victoria. Each episode is presented from the perspective of the officers. This was a specific technique that creator Hal McElroy chose to employ.

The police officers, commonly referred to as "Heelers", are always active sorting out the town's many problems. These problems range from trivial complaints such as land and fencing disputes to more serious offences, such as homicides and assaults. The small town is also faced with many other significant occurrences including bank robberies, escaped criminals, police shootings, kidnappings and the acts of deluded criminals. Of these, one of the more significant events is the bombing of the police station during the show's twelfth season.

Whenever overwhelmed, the Heelers call on the assistance of the police in the larger town of St Davids, home of the resident police inspector Russell Falcon-Price. An antagonist in the series, Falcon-Price often tries to terminate the employment of the Mount Thomas sergeant or to close the entire station, which in reality would be almost entirely out of his control.

Along with their police work, aspects of the Heelers' personal lives are regularly featured, notably the relationship between Maggie and PJ, which ends with Maggie's death in one of the most watched moments on Australian television.

== Episodes ==
Season	Episodes	Originally released	
Season	Episodes	First released	Last released
1	45	18 January 1994	22 November 1994
2	41	21 February 1995	21 November 1995
3	42	12 February 1996	26 November 1996
4	42	10 February 1997	25 November 1997
5	41	24 February 1998	25 November 1998
6	42	10 February 1999	24 November 1999
7	41	9 February 2000	22 November 2000
8	42	21 February 2001	28 November 2001
9	40	13 February 2002	20 November 2002
10	42	12 February 2003	26 November 2003
11	39	4 February 2004	5 November 2004
12	42	2 February 2005	26 November 2005
13	11	1 April 2006	4 June 2006

== Cast ==
=== Main ===
Actor	Character	Episode count	Season												
Actor	Character	Episode count	1	2	3	4	5	6	7	8	9	10	11	12	13
John Wood	Tom Croydon	510	Main	Main	Main	Main	Main	Main	Main	Main	Main	Main	Main	Main	Main
Julie Nihill	Chris Riley	510	Main	Main	Main	Main	Main	Main	Main	Main	Main	Main	Main	Main	Main
Martin Sacks	P. J. Hasham	484	Main	Main	Main	Main	Main	Main	Main	Main	Main	Main	Main	Main	
Lisa McCune	Maggie Doyle	255	Main	Main	Main	Main	Main	Main	Main						
William McInnes	Nick Schultz	214	Main	Main	Main	Main	Main						Guest	Guest	
Grant Bowler	Wayne Patterson	96	Main	Main	Main										
Ann Burbrook	Roz Patterson	31	Main		Guest										
Damian Walshe-Howling	Adam Cooper	178	Main	Main	Main	Main	Main								Guest
Tasma Walton	Dash McKinley	128			Main	Main	Main	Main							
Paul Bishop	Ben Stewart	253					Main	Main	Main	Main	Main	Main	Main		
Rupert Reid	Jack Lawson	102						Main	Main	Main					
Jane Allsop	Jo Parrish	202						Main	Main	Main	Main	Main	Main		
Caroline Craig	Tess Gallagher	139							Main	Main	Main	Main			
Ditch Davey	Evan Jones	193								Main	Main	Main	Main	Main	Main
Simone McAullay	Susie Raynor	99										Main	Main	Main	Main
Rachel Gordon	Amy Fox	70											Main	Main	Main
Samantha Tolj	Kelly O'Rourke	69											Main	Main	Main
Danny Raco	Joss Peroni	69											Main	Main	Main
Geoff Morrell	Mark Jacobs	59											Main	Main	
Charlie Clausen	Alex Kirby	50												Main	Main
Matt Holmes	Matt Graham	20												Main	Main

Blue Heelers final cast of 2006

=== Recurring cast ===
Actor	Character	Episode count	Reference
Arianthe Galani	Helena Hasham	6	
Beth Buchanan	Susan Croydon	15	
Brett Climo	Robbie Doyle	9	
Catherine Wilkin	Sally Downie	14	
Damien Fotiou	Vinnie Morelli	3	
Danny Adcock	Barry Baxter	8	
David Lyons	Jason Tyler	3	
Debra Lawrance	Grace Curtis	26	
Dennis Miller	Pat Doyle	14	
Emily Browning	Hayley Fulton	9	
Frances O'Connor	Gabe Greenway	3	
Helen Thomson	Dr Tatiana Zylinski	6	
Jack Finsterer	Detective Constable Johnny Kowalski	4	
Jeremy Kewley	Tony Timms	23	
Josh Lawson	David Murray	5	
Kevin Harrington	Charlie McKinley	4	
Martin Copping	Boyd Spurling	5	
Marty Fields	Sgt. Roy Holland	4	
Matt Passmore	Brad Fingleton	5	
Merfyn Owen	Father Brian Hegerty	11	
Michael Isaacs	Clancy Freeman	11	
Mirrah Foulkes	Deborah Masters	3	
Neil Pigot	Inspector Russel Falcon-Price	42	
Peta Doodson	Inspector Monica Draper	33	
Rachel Blakely	Gina Belfanti	10	
Reg Evans	Keith Purvis	5 +	
Richard Carter	Les Anderson	4	
Richard Huggett	Detective Constable Sean Neale	6	
Roger Oakley	Russ Cavell	4	
Roy Billing	Senior Constable Ian Goss	5	
Sarah Chadwick	Acting Sgt Lindy Schroeder	3	
Stephen Curry	Eddie Dodds	3	
Steve Mouzakis	Theo Kallergis	5	
Suzi Dougherty	Dr. Mel Carter	30	
Tara Morice	Melanie Anderson	5	
Terence Donovan	Ian Waldron	3	
Terry Gill	Superintendent Clive Adamson	5	
Terry Serio	Mick Doyle	8	
Todd MacDonald	Brendan Maguire	3	
Tottie Goldsmith	Fay Tudor	3	
Vince Colosimo	Bill Lapscott	3	

== Production ==
On average, 42 episodes of Blue Heelers were broadcast per year on Australian television, with each episode comprising fifty scenes. One episode was made every week. The scripts were written to a formula which allowed one day for rehearsal, two days on location and two days in the studio. Episodes were shot eight to ten weeks ahead of their scheduled broadcast date. There were 16 episodes in various stages of production at any one time (from the conception of new storylines to post-production). In addition, there were always seven complete episodes waiting to go to air. Apart from the regular cast members, the show employed 4,300 guest actors annually, plus 30 extras every week. A total of 150 people were involved in some way with the show's production each week, including cast members, crew, wardrobe, publicists and writers.

=== Conception and development ===
Blue Heelers creator/producer, Hal McElroy, conceived the idea of Blue Heelers when he heard that an eighteen-year-old friend was planning to become a police officer. Intrigued, he inquired as to why this young boy, fresh out of school, would want to become a police officer, as opposed to the many other opportunities he had open to him. McElroy soon discovered that, at the time, a staggering 60% of Australian police officers were under the age of 26. This, coupled with McElroy's desire to create a country cop show, formed the basis of the programme. When this same young officer left the force only a year later due to the shooting death of his colleague, McElroy was even more intrigued to learn about the very fickle, yet rewarding job of policing the community. McElroy continued his quest by asking ex-police officer Michael Winter to write down what it was like to be a city cop who transferred to a country town. These became the ideas that Blue Heelers was based around. Michael Winter also conceived the name of the programme by recounting the common names for a country police officer: "tyre-biters"—referring to the fact that country cops are often involved in car chases—and "blue heelers"—referring to their blue uniforms and overall similar appearance and persona to a Blue Heeler dog, a protective and intuitive breed of Australian dog. From the time that McElroy's idea was initially conceived, to the time the programme was ready to air, three years passed.

During the early development of Blue Heelers two completely different pilots were shot: one depicting the story from the perspective of a police officer and the other from the perspective of a criminal. When these were presented to the Seven Network, the network committed to 13 episodes of the first pilot. The pilot went on to become the official first episode of Blue Heelers, telling the story of a new cop in town, Maggie Doyle, and her beginnings in Mount Thomas. Hal McElroy chose to discard the second pilot, realising it was a fatal mistake to be "with the criminals as they plotted the crime". He also conceived his rule that the producers of the show "couldn't have a camera in a room unless there was a copper there as well" (a rule shared by long-running UK Police drama The Bill). Hence, the basis of the show being from a police officer's perspective became a firm reality. (The only bending of this rule was with scenes featuring publican Chris; as she was billed with the main cast, she was given the same on-screen "rules" as the officers. In early episodes, before she worked at the station, this "rule" also applied to Wayne Patterson's wife Roz).

Hal McElroy gives his police adviser's opinion:

He had been posted to Yass (in New South Wales) and he really loved it up there because the routine was so simple and straightforward-most often you knew the victim and sometimes you knew the culprit, and someone in charge would give them a clip behind the ear and say 'wash the police car' or 'sweep the yard' and 'don't ever do it again', rather than sending a juvenile to jail.

I loved it, and I said 'Hey this is great'. But all the writers said, 'No it's boring, we want that gritty, inner-city police stuff'. (We had Boys in Blue set up in Leichhardt in Sydney.) And I still remember the moment I was driving home up River Road and I thought, 'Then we can have two shows'. I said to this copper 'What are you called in the country? What is your nickname?' And he said they call highway patrol 'tyre biters' and coppers 'blue heelers'. And I thought 'That's the title!' So I rang [scriptwriter] Tony Morphett and said 'Let's do a show about young cops in the country. It's called Blue Heelers.

— Hal McElroy,

By creating the programme, McElroy and Morphett hoped to close the gap between to police and the public. They hoped to show the human side of the policing and that, like other citizens, police officers have feelings, regrets, aspirations and fears. They also hoped that the show would act as a tribute to the courage of police officers, who risk their lives everyday, never knowing if they would return home at the end of the day.

=== Filming locations ===
Only about half of the footage for each episode was shot on location. Most of the scenes, including scenes in the police station and pub, were filmed at the Seven Network studios in Melbourne. Much of the filming on location was carried out in towns such as Williamstown, and the more established parts of Werribee. The scenes of the outside of the Mount Thomas police station were actually filmed at the old, disused Williamstown police station, which was then a private residence. Scenes at Mount Thomas High School were filmed at Williamstown High School. The town of Castlemaine was most often used as the backdrop for Mount Thomas, seen in almost every episode. Although the Blue Heelers' pilot was shot in Castlemaine, the cast and crew very rarely returned there to shoot further episodes; images of Castlemaine were usually just establishing shots. Chris Riley's fictional Imperial Hotel, for example, was actually the real Imperial Hotel in Castlemaine. Mount Thomas' fictional Commercial Hotel was filmed at the Willy Tavern in Williamstown. The second Mount Thomas police station, adopted during the programme's reform of 2004, was filmed at Newport Railway workshops. The Mount Thomas Hospital was filmed at the Werribee Mercy Hospital. Sunbury railway station was commonly used as the Mount Thomas railway station. Hobson's Bay, and Wyndham, Victoria were also locations used in Blue Heelers.

=== 2004 revamp: the station bombing ===
After low ratings in 2003 and 2004, the producers and executives of Blue Heelers realised that there were apparent problems which could potentially lead to the series' downfall. In 2004, Blue Heelers lost the top ratings spot to McLeod's Daughters. During 2003 and 2004, Australian television drama was also at its "lowest point in a decade" and many popular shows were cancelled. As the show remained basically unchanged from its debut ten years earlier, the production team decided that a revamp was in order.

At the beginning of season 11, the revamp began with new, more modern opening credits, using an electric guitar, rather than an acoustic. Later in that season, a live episode, "Reasonable Doubt", was broadcast in hope of offering a short-term ratings boost and encourage more long-term viewers. Although an immediate success, the live episode did not bring about a sustained increase in ratings. Producers also hoped that a shift in direction, a change of mood and setting, and the addition of four cast members would cement Blue Heelers' long-term future. They also wanted the show to remain relevant and more accurately reflect today's modern world:

Mount Thomas was created in 1993 and the world has changed... It will now be more reflective of today's country towns, not the sleepy backwater it was. It wasn't an easy task but the creative team responded brilliantly and there's a real feeling of excitement again... The old girl can still dance. And dance to new tunes.

— John Holmes,

The main plot, setting and character changes started in July 2004, with the airing of the episode "End of Innocence". In this episode, the main storyline was the bombing of the Mount Thomas police station. The blast killed popular main character Snr. Const. Jo Parrish (Jane Allsop) and recurring cast member Clancy Freeman, and injured the show's main protagonist, Senior Sergeant Croydon. After the bombing it was revealed that Croydon's wife, the Reverend Curtis, was missing. It was later revealed she had been brutally raped and murdered. These events brought about sweeping changes to the mood of not only Croydon but also the mood of the entire show. The Daily Telegraph television writer Marcus Casey commented, "Mount Thomas has become a darker, grittier place, the people and cops in it transformed by an invasion of evil". Consequently, the story changed its focus from the old Mount Thomas police station to the new one that was used until the show's cancellation in 2006. The Seven Network feared that in the modern post-9/11 world, a show about country police was no longer what audiences wanted. Storylines of the proceeding five episodes focused on the bombing of the station and the four new main characters: Rachel Gordon as Amy Fox, Geoff Morrell as Mark Jacobs, Samantha Tolj as Kelly O'Rourke, and Danny Raco as Joss Peroni. Popular former cast member William McInnes also returned to the show, temporarily reprising his role as Nick Schultz. Producers hoped the new tone of the series, the new younger actors, and McInnes's role reprisal would lure back viewers who had stopped watching the programme. This new style of programme that Blue Heelers was embracing was a sign of the show trying to keep up with other larger television shows, particularly the CSI franchise.

The revamp of the series resulted in a 25% ratings increase, bringing the series' weekly viewership to 1.6 million people. Critical response after the event was reassuring, and it appeared that critics were approving of the drastic moves by Seven and Southern Star:

The recent shake-up at the old station has swept aside an unhealthy staleness that had settled on the place and there's some much-needed fresh energy provided by the new recruits, including Samantha Tolj as true-blue Aussie gal Kelly O'Rourke and Danny Raco as Italian stallion Joss Peroni.

— Debi Enker,

=== Cancellation ===
In the hope that viewing would increase, an 11-episode season in 2006 was commissioned by the Seven Network. However, the ratings spike begun in 2004 was not sufficient for the Seven Network to commit to continuing to produce the show. In January 2006, Seven officially announced that they had cancelled Blue Heelers but would air a final shortened season of 11 episodes in mid–2006. At the time, the show was still drawing 1.2 million viewers per week on average, down from the 3.5 million it was drawing at its peak. The announcement was front-page news on nearly all of Australia's major newspapers, including The Sydney Morning Herald, The Daily Telegraph (Sydney), The Herald Sun, The Age and Brisbane's Courier Mail. Two different endings were shot for the final episode, which finished filming on 20 December 2005. The first ending wrapped up all the show's storylines, while the second left the show open for another season; the second version was used.

For Blue Heelers' final season in 2006, it was moved from its primetime Wednesday-night timeslot, to a lower-rating Saturday-night timeslot. In the Saturday timeslot, Blue Heelers competed with The Bill, a British police drama which had become quite popular in Australia on the Australian Broadcasting Corporation, and Saturday Night AFL Coverage on Fox Footy Channel and Network Ten. This move was slammed by leading cast member John Wood. Blue Heelers' cancellation may also be related to Seven's AFL broadcast, which saw Seven invest $780m for the 5-year broadcasting rights of the game.

== Broadcast ==
=== Australia ===
Blue Heelers originally aired on Tuesday nights at 7:30 pm on the Seven Network, thus it was limited to a PG content level restriction. When the series was hailed as a success, it began the transition from this timeslot to the 8:30 pm timeslot on the same day. After the move, writers could explore more diverse storylines, as the show was restricted to an M rating. The third and fourth season premiers aired on Monday nights during the 8:30 pm timeslot, but the show moved back to its original slot before the next episode. In its fifth season, Blue Heelers moved to the Wednesday night 8:30 pm timeslot, which it occupied for most of its run, until the end of its twelfth season. This move was made to make way for hospital drama All Saints.

Starting in 2004, the Seven Network aired Blue Heelers weekdays at 2:00 pm. All episodes aired with the final episode airing in 2007. This made way for the broadcast of early episodes of All Saints.

Seasons generally ran in Australia from early February to late November. Each season generally consisted of 41 to 42 episodes. The eleventh season however, only consisted of 39 episodes, as the Seven Network had gained the rights to televise the 2004 Athens Olympic Games. In total, 510 episodes were aired: 509-hour-long standard episodes and one live episode. The live episode, titled "Reasonable Doubts", was filmed to celebrate Blue Heelers 10th year on the air. To prepare, the cast was given six days to memorise their lines.

The final episode of the 13th season aired as a 2-hour tribute. It opened with an introduction from John Wood and concluded with a compilation of Blue Heelers moments from over its 13-season run.

Australian television quiz-show The Weakest Link, hosted by Cornelia Frances, also aired a Blue Heelers special episode on 9 August 2001. Cast members John Wood, Neil Pigot, Ditch Davey, Jeremy Kewley, Jane Allsop, Suzi Dougherty, Paul Bishop, Caroline Craig and Peta Doodson took part in this special event.

In February 2014, repeats of series 12 started airing; and, in May 2014, repeats of series 13 aired on 7two. Blue Heelers has also screened on Hallmark Channel in Australia in various time-slots.

=== International ===
Blue Heelers had a strong following not only in Australia but also worldwide; it has been sold to 108 territories and is shown in over 70 countries.

==== New Zealand ====
In New Zealand Blue Heelers screened on TV One in a popular timeslot. However, following the on-screen death of Maggie Doyle, ratings fell, and the show was moved to a 9:30 pm slot on Friday. Following that, the show moved to a late night Thursday slot where the rest of the episodes played out, with the show beginning anywhere between 11:30 pm and midnight. It aired its final episode on TV One on 20 March 2008.

==== Ireland ====
Debuted on RTÉ on 15 September 1995, initially airing every Friday afternoon at 4:30pm. In 1998, the show moved to a late night slot on RTÉ2, typically airing around 1:00am on Thursdays.

Season 5 premiered in September 2001, and was promoted to weekday mornings at 10:30am on RTÉ One. With five episodes airing per week, the Irish broadcast quickly caught up with the Australian schedule. As a result, in 2004, RTÉ reduced its output to a single weekly episode, which aired late on Thursday nights, usually around 1:00am.

RTÉ began broadcasting the final season on 30 May 2008 in a late-night Saturday slot, with the series finale airing on 30 November 2008.

On 24 June 2009, RTÉ began re-airing Blue Heelers from the beginning, typically in a very early Sunday morning slot around 4:00am.

RTÉ screened all episodes in their original unedited state. The drama proved very popular in Ireland and rated very well.

==== United States ====
Blue Heelers aired briefly in the United States of America in the early 2000s on the short-lived cable channel Trio (carried primarily by DirecTV). No episode after number 76 was ever shown in the United States, and when Trio changed their programming in 2004, Blue Heelers was dropped from the schedule. The series returned to US airwaves in September 2021 on the new digital network DigiTV, a channel devoted mainly to imported British and Australian series.

==== Canada ====
Blue Heelers was broadcast on Showcase in Canada, last airing on 15 May 1998.

==== United Kingdom ====
In the United Kingdom, Blue Heelers was broadcast on most of the regional franchises of the ITV Network. At least ten out of the fourteen regional companies that formed ITV aired the first few years of the series and most initially broadcast it in the original hour-long format during the afternoon (with necessary edits to suit the time slot, usually regarding profanity). Some ITV regions edited each episode into two half-hour editions, and stripped these episodes across two or three days. This half-hour format of broadcasting Australian series was well established by ITV with A Country Practice. Very early hour-long episodes of Blue Heelers also ran unedited later in the evening, around midnight, on both Central and UTV.

Carlton Television and Westcountry Television were the first to broadcast Blue Heelers, and they began with three half-hour weekly episodes, Monday to Wednesday, 14:20-14:50, starting from 3 January 1995. Later in the year, they then switched to airing hour-long episodes, 14:20-15:20, on Mondays. Central Television were next to start in February 1995 with a late night 23.40-00:35 slot on Tuesdays, before following Carlton with the half-hour 14.20-14:50 slot on Mondays and Tuesdays from March. Central also reverted to hour long episodes in 1996, usually on Monday and Friday, 14:20-15:15, but went back down to one hourly episode per week in 1997, on Mondays, 13:50-14:45, as the gap with Australian broadcasts narrowed. By 2000, half-hour editions were being aired again, 13:30-14:00, but now on Tuesday and Wednesday. Central were one of the most consistent ITV regions to broadcast Blue Heelers, completing series 6 by summer 2001. The final batch of episodes shown in these regions were from Season 7. Westcountry and Central started to screened this series as hour long episodes each Friday 14:10-15:10 during the summer 2002, before reverting back to the half hour format during the autumn. Carlton kept the half-hour episodes screening the series in half-hour in the autumn, and finishing the season 7 on Wednesday, 20 November 2002 (Australian air date: 22 November 2000).

Blue Heelers also aired on Anglia Television, Meridian Television and Channel Television, typically Mondays at 14:20-15:15. During the summer school holidays, it was broadcast daily in a morning slot, usually from 11:05, until late 1998. Granada Television and Border Television also screened the series from 1995 in the hour long format but by 1998, these regions had dropped the series. Ulster Television (UTV) began airing Blue Heelers in early 1995. The show initially screened 3 times a week, on Monday, Wednesday and Friday afternoons at 13:50, later moving to 14:20. UTV aired several episodes late night, around 11:40pm on Wednesdays or Thursdays during July 1997, as their content was deemed unsuitable for daytime viewing. UTV cancelled Blue Heelers in 1998.

Scottish Television began aired hour-long episodes from January 1995, airing on Fridays, Then Tuesday from May until Xmas 1995, the series was dropped as there was no room do to network programmes, 2 editions went out in 1996, the series returned on 9 January 1998 on Fridays until the end of march, then reappeared on 3rd Oct with Eps65 until 19 December. During 1999 From April until early August the series was broadcast at 04.30 most weekday morning before being dropped completely.

Grampian Television, HTV, Yorkshire Television, and Tyne Tees Television all chose not to purchase Blue Heelers, opting for locally made programming instead.

When the English ITV contractors reformatted as one company in late 2002, regionally-run programmes such as Blue Heelers and Shortland Street (which were at different points of the series in each region) disappeared from the schedules. No ITV region ever screened the series in full. Blue Heelers also aired on an early UK digital and cable channel, Carlton Select, in the late 1990s. Early episodes aired daily, and then in a weekly slot on Fridays at 20.00 as episodes became more recent. Episodes to the later part of the 1997 season were shown before the series was dropped, along with the entire channel shortly afterwards.

== Home media ==
=== Home Media Overview ===
- 2005–2011: Paramount Pictures released each season of Blue Heelers on DVD.
- July 2013: The show's production company, Endemol Australia (formerly Southern Star Productions), stated there are no plans at this stage to re-release.
- November 2015: Channel 7 said that there are still no plans to re-release Blue Heelers on DVD or Blu-ray.
- May 2017: Via Vision Entertainment stated they would be re-releasing Blue Heelers on DVD.
- 2017–2018: Via Vision Entertainment released four collectable box sets of Blue Heelers which featured all 510 episodes.
- 2018: Via Vision Entertainment released Blue Heelers: The Complete Collection.
- August 2018: 7plus (Channel 7 Streaming Service) started releasing all episodes.

=== VHS Releases ===
Title	Format	Episodes #	Tapes & discs	Region 4 (Australia)	Special features	Distributors
Welcome To Mt Thomas	VHS	Season 1, Episode 1 & 2	1		N/A	
The Earth is Made of Glass	VHS	Season 1, Episode 3 & 4	1		N/A	
The Spice of Life	VHS	Season 1, Episode 5 & 6	1		N/A	
The Wheel of Chance	VHS	Season 1, Episode 7 & 8	1		N/A	
Cops with Heart	VHS	Season 1, Episode 1 Season 2, Episode 22 & 23	1	28 November 1996	Behind The Scenes	Buena Vista Home Entertainment
Stories from the heart	VHS	Season 1, Episode 18 & 23; Season 2, Episode 40 & 41	1	1996	Interviews with the cast	
Brotherly Love – Parts 1 & 2	VHS	Season 2, Episodes 40 & 41	1	3 August 1998	None	
Double Jeopardy – Parts 1 & 2	VHS	Season 2, Episodes 30 & 31	1	7 September 1998	None	
Paranoia – Parts 1 & 2	VHS	Season 2, Episodes 22 & 23	1	5 October 1998	None	

=== DVD Releases ===
TimeLife (DVD Releases)
Title	Format	Episodes #	Tapes & discs	Region 4 (Australia)	Special features	Distributors
Welcome To Mt Thomas	DVD	Season 1: Episode 1 & 2	1	2003	None	TimeLife
The Earth is Made of Glass	DVD	Season 1: Episode 3 & 4	1	2003	None	TimeLife
The Spice of Life	DVD	Season 1: Episode 5 & 6	1	2003	None	TimeLife
The Wheel of Chance	DVD	Season 1: Episode 7 & 8	1	2003	None	TimeLife

Paramount Home Entertainment (DVD Releases)
Title	Format	Episodes #	Tapes & discs	Region 4 (Australia)	Special features	Distributors
Blue Heelers Season 1	DVD	Series 1, Episodes 1–17	6	2 November 2005	Photo Gallery	Paramount Home Entertainment
Blue Heelers Season 2 (Parts 1&2)	DVD	Series 1, Episodes 18–45 Series 2, Episodes 1–9	10	1 December 2005	Photo Gallery; Commentary on episodes 19 and 44 (season 1)	Paramount Home Entertainment
Blue Heelers Season 3 (Parts 1 & 2)	DVD	Season 2, Episodes 10–41 Season 3, Episodes 1–10	11	16 February 2006	Photo Gallery	Paramount Home Entertainment
Blue Heelers Season 4 (Parts 1 & 2)	DVD	Season 3, Episodes 11–42 Season 4, Episode 1–11	11	6 April 2006	Photo Gallery	Paramount Home Entertainment
Blue Heelers Season 5 (Parts 1 & 2)	DVD	Season 4, Episodes 12–42 Season 5, Episode 1–11	11	6 June 2006	Photo Gallery	Paramount Home Entertainment
Blue Heelers Season 6 (Parts 1 & 2)	DVD	Season 5, Episode 12–41 Season 6, Episode 1–12	11	10 August 2006	Photo Gallery	Paramount Home Entertainment
Blue Heelers Season 7 (Parts 1 & 2)	DVD	Season 6, Episodes 13–42 Season 7, Episodes 1–12	11	31 July 2008	Photo Gallery	Paramount Home Entertainment
Blue Heelers Season 8 (Parts 1 & 2)	DVD	Season 7, Episodes 13–41 Season 8, Episodes 1–12	11	1 October 2008	Photo Gallery	Paramount Home Entertainment
Blue Heelers Season 9 (Parts 1 & 2)	DVD	Season 8, Episode 18–42 Season 9, Episodes 1–12	11	5 November 2009	Photo Gallery	Paramount Home Entertainment
Blue Heelers Season 10 (Parts 1 & 2)	DVD	Season 9, Episodes 13–40 Season 10, Episodes 1–12	10	6 May 2010	None	Paramount Home Entertainment
Blue Heelers Season 11 (Parts 1 & 2)	DVD	Season 10, Episodes 13–42 Season 11, Episode 1–10	10	5 August 2010	None	Paramount Home Entertainment
Blue Heelers Season 12	DVD	Season 11, Episodes 11–40	8	4 November 2010	Blue Heelers: Live Episode	Paramount Home Entertainment
Blue Heelers Season 13 (Parts 1 & 2)	DVD	Season 12, Episodes 1–20 Season 12, Episodes 21–42	10	3 March 2011	None	Paramount Home Entertainment
Blue Heelers Season 14	DVD	Season 13, Episodes 1–10	3	2 June 2011	None	Paramount Home Entertainment

Via Vision Entertainment (DVD Releases)
Title	Format	Episodes #	Tapes & discs	Region 4 (Australia)	Special features	Distributors
Blue Heelers (Collection 1)	DVD	Series 1, Episodes 1–45 Series 2, Episodes 1–41 Series 3, Episodes 1–10	27	5 July 2017	Photo Galleries Commentary on Episodes 19 & 44	Via Vision Entertainment
Blue Heelers (Collection 2)	DVD	Series 3, Episodes 11–42 Series 4, Episodes 1–42 Series 5, Episodes 1–41 Series 6, Episodes 1–42 Series 7, Episodes 1–12	44	6 September 2017	Photo Galleries (Series 4–7)	Via Vision Entertainment
Blue Heelers (Collection 3)	DVD	Series 7, Episodes 13–41 Series 8, Episodes 1–42 Series 9, Episodes 1–41 Series 10, Episode 1–11	37	4 October 2017	Photo Galleries (Series 8–9)	Via Vision Entertainment
Blue Heelers (Collection 4)	DVD	Series 10, Episodes 12–42 Series 11, Episodes 1–39 Series 12, Episodes 1–42 Series 13, Episode 1–11	31	3 November 2017	Blue Heelers: Live Episode	Via Vision Entertainment
Blue Heelers (Complete Collection)	DVD	Series 1–13, Episodes 1–510	134	17 October 2018	Selected Episode Commentaries Photo Gallery (Series 1–9) Blue Heelers: Live Episode	Via Vision Entertainment
Blue Heelers (Complete Collection)	DVD	Series 1–13, Episodes 1–510	134	29 November 2023	Selected Episode Commentaries Photo Gallery (Series 1–9) Blue Heelers: Live Episode	Via Vision Entertainment

=== Streaming ===
Blue Heelers 7+ streaming
Title	Format	Episodes #	Release date	Streaming Status	Distributors
Blue Heelers Season One	Streaming	Episodes 17	12 August 2018	Currently Streaming	7plus
Blue Heelers Season Two	Streaming	Episodes 37	12 August 2018	Currently Streaming	7plus
Blue Heelers Season Three	Streaming	Episodes 42	12 August 2018	Currently Streaming	7plus
Blue Heelers Season Four	Streaming	Episodes 43	17 August 2018	Currently Streaming	7plus
Blue Heelers Season Five	Streaming	Episodes 42	17 August 2018	Currently Streaming	7plus
Blue Heelers Season Six	Streaming	Episodes 42	17 August 2018	Currently Streaming	7plus
Blue Heelers Season Seven	Streaming	Episodes 42	17 August 2018	Currently Streaming	7plus
Blue Heelers Season Eight	Streaming	Episodes 41	17 August 2018	Currently Streaming	7plus
Blue Heelers Season Nine	Streaming	Episodes 42	21 August 2018	Currently Streaming	7plus
Blue Heelers Season Ten	Streaming	Episodes 40	21 August 2018	Currently Streaming	7plus
Blue Heelers Season Eleven	Streaming	Episodes 40	21 August 2018	Currently Streaming	7plus
Blue Heelers Season Twelve	Streaming	Episodes 29	24 August 2018	Currently Streaming	7plus
Blue Heelers Season Thirteen	Streaming	Episodes 42	24 August 2018	Currently Streaming	7plus
Blue Heelers Season Fourteen	Streaming	Episodes 10	24 August 2018	Currently Streaming	7plus

== Reception ==
=== Critical response ===
Described by critics before its launch as "A Country Practice meets Cop Shop", and as "the contemporary cousin of British cop show, Heartbeat", Blue Heelers was not anticipated by critics to become a hugely popular programme.

=== Viewership ===
It became a hit TV show soon after it began airing. During most of its broadcast, Blue Heelers was very popular in Australia, regularly attracting up to 2.5 million viewers, and up to 3.5 million viewers at its peak. Throughout the show's broadcast it continually drew a strong audience, regularly appearing among the top-rating prime time programmes on Australian television. Viewership of Blue Heelers never dropped below 1 million viewers. The episodes "Gold" and "Fool's Gold" (episodes 140 and 141), which aired during the programme's fourth season, were two of the most popular Blue Heelers episodes. Each drew 2.5 million viewers, considered a huge achievement in 1997.

Blue Heelers' executive producer, Gus Howard believed the show's popularity was due mainly to the quality of the cast.

Much of the success of Blue Heelers has been attributed to one of the best ensemble casts of any drama on television, with most every cast member becoming a household name... The basic vocation for the show has always been about shedding a little light on the human condition, something Australian audiences have readily identified with. The show epitomises and represents the Australian ethos in a way that truly reflects Australian life.

— Gus Howard,

Much of the show's sixth season, as well as the first 10 episodes of its seventh season, were the most watched episodes of the series. These episodes focus of the death of Maggie Doyle (played by Lisa McCune). Maggie's being shot and left for dead during episode 255, "One More Day", was ranked by TV Week as the third most memorable moment of a drama series on Australian television.

Season	No. of episodes	Originally Aired		Viewers (in millions)	Rating	Drama Rank
Season	No. of episodes	Season premiere	Season finale	Viewers (in millions)	Rating	Drama Rank
1	45	10 September 1993	22 November 1994	—N/a		
2	41	21 February 1995	21 November 1995	—N/a		
3	42	12 February 1996	26 November 1996	—N/a		
4	42	10 February 1997	25 November 1997	—N/a		
5	41	24 February 1998	25 November 1998	—N/a	18.0	#1
6	42	10 February 1999	24 November 1999	—N/a	15.6	#2
7	41	9 February 2000	22 November 2000	—N/a	13.7	#2
8	41	21 February 2001	28 November 2001	1.757	13.4	#1
9	40	13 February 2002	20 November 2002	1.508	11.3	#2
10	42	12 February 2003	26 November 2003	1.397	10.3	#3
11	39	4 February 2004	5 November 2004	1.264	9.3	#12
12	42	2 February 2005	26 November 2005	1.209	8.7	#19
13	11	1 April 2006	4 June 2006	—N/a		

=== Awards and nominations ===
In terms of awards, Blue Heelers is regarded as one of the most successful programmes on Australian television. Blue Heelers has been the recipient of many awards, including 25 Logie Awards, five of which are the prestigious Gold Logie, 3 AFI Television Awards, 3 People's Choice Awards, and 1 AWGIE Awards. Blue Heelers was nominated for a further twelve Gold Logies. Blue Heelers has also won multiple Silver Logies, including numerous Most Popular Actor, Most Popular Actress and Most Popular Programme awards, as well as many Outstanding Awards. Many Blue Heelers cast members have also presented awards at the Logies. In the 2005 50 Years 50 Shows poll, Blue Heelers was voted 37th greatest show on Australian television and ranked within the top ten dramas.

Blue Heelers award summary
Award	Wins	Nominations
Gold Logie Awards	5	5
Silver Logie Awards	20	35
AFI Television Awards	3	4
AWGIE Awards	1	1
People's Choice Awards	3	6
Australian Screen Editors' Awards	0	1
TOTAL	32	52

== Merchandise ==
A CD Album titled Music From Blue Heelers was released in 1995. It included the Blue Heelers theme music, plus other songs related to the program, many of them country songs.

The first full Blue Heelers novel, Maggie's Story, was written by Roger Dunn and released in 1997 by Coronet Books. In August 1998, a second novel, Tom's Story, written by Cassandra Carter was released by Bolinda Publishing.

Name	Format	Release
Music From Blue Heelers	CD	1995
Blue Heelers Maggie's Story	Book	1997
Blue Heelers Tom's Story	Book	August 1998
Blue Heelers	calendar	1999

== See also ==
- List of Australian television series
- Mount Thomas
- Victoria Police
- List of longest-running Australian television series
