= Maggie Doyle =

- Blue Heelers character
- Lisa McCune as Maggie Doyle
- First appearance: "A Woman's Place"; 18 January 1994
- Last appearance: "One More Day"; 16 February 2000
- Created by: Hal McElroy and Tony Morphett
- Portrayed by: Lisa McCune

In-universe information
- Full name: Margaret Ann Doyle
- Occupation: Police officer
- Family: Pat Doyle (father); Mick Doyle (brother); Robbie Doyle (brother)
- Significant other: P. J. Hasham (fiancé)
- Religion: Roman Catholic

Career with Victoria Police
- Position: Mt. Thomas Police Station: General Duties; Acting Station Sergeant (1998–1999)
- Rank: Senior Constable
- Years of service: c. 1992–2000 †

Maggie Doyle is a fictional character in the long-running Australian police drama Blue Heelers, portrayed by Lisa McCune. A feisty young constable from a policing family, Maggie arrived in Mount Thomas during the first episode, which follows her as she meets each of her colleagues in turn. The first female constable to join the station, she is faced with the prospect of not only learning how policing is a little bit different in a country town, but also with overcoming the chauvinism of some of the locals, and of some of her colleagues. She remained with the show for exactly half of its run, departing during the second episode of the seventh season, and was the fifth-longest serving character, appearing in 250 of the 510 episodes to air. (Note: McCune appeared as Maggie Doyle in 250 episodes of the show between 1994 and 2000. She was also credited for five episodes in which she did not appear in 1999, and made an uncredited appearance in a flashback scene in 2004.)

== Development and casting ==
The character of Maggie Doyle was created by Hal McElroy and Tony Morphett as a young constable just arriving in the town of Mount Thomas. Her early characterisation is that of a young woman, determined to prove herself, and who is unwilling to stand for any form of discrimination.

Lisa McCune came to the role at the age of just 22, having appeared mainly in advertisements and theatre-work. McCune had her first audition with creator and producer Hal McElroy. She told Doug Aiton of The Age: "It was a fabulous audition because everyone in the room was going for the part they were reading." McCune did two more auditions, and told Aiton that for the first time, she felt relaxed. The producers also made everyone feel like they wanted them to do well. She then spent the days after the auditions talking to her agent Cluny Morton, who would keep her updated on the casting progress. Eventually, Morton informed McCune that the producers wanted her for Maggie. McCune admitted that she did not think she would get the part, as she thought she was not strong or "weighty" enough, but she was "delighted". She was also aware that as it was just the pilot she was cast for, it might not work out, but two weeks later the cast were informed that the show was going ahead for an initial run of 13 weeks. According to Ann Tenna, also of The Age, station bosses believed that, despite her inexperience, McCune would "take our sitting rooms by storm".

Although it had been claimed that McCune was originally cast as Roz Patterson, but swapped roles with Ann Burbrook, this was denied by Hal McElroy in an interview with TVFlashback.com, who confirmed that McCune had always been intended to play Maggie Doyle.

Maggie's departure from the show was the culmination of a three-year-long arc which saw her deal with her brother's addiction to drugs, and then attempt to bring down the drug ring which had ultimately contributed to his death. Although McCune has stated that she fought to prevent her character being killed off, Maggie's death went ahead, and became one of the most-watched moments in Australian television history.

== Character background ==
In her fictional backstory, the character is the only daughter of police officer Pat Doyle and his wife, Kathleen. She is the youngest member of a policing family, with her eldest brother Mick serving as a detective in the Internal Investigations Division (IID), later known as the Ethical Standards Department (ESD), while her second eldest brother Robbie worked primarily in an administrative role. Kathleen Doyle died sometime between her daughter's graduation from the Police Academy, and her arrival in Mount Thomas. Without the family matriarch, the Doyle family were described by Tom Croydon as the most hide-bound and pig-headed family he'd ever met.

Coming from a family of Irish Catholics, Maggie was educated, at least during her primary years, at an unnamed Catholic school staffed by nuns. On one occasion, she insisted on playing the part of Joseph in the nativity play and, on another, the eight-year-old Maggie performed a citizen's arrest on a classmate and dragged him down to the police station for squirting one of the nuns with the bubbler.

== Role on Blue Heelers ==
Maggie officially joined the Victoria Police midway through 1992, having graduated from the Academy in the same class as her then lover, and later colleague, Wayne Patterson (Grant Bowler). After the academy, she was gazetted to an unspecified station in Melbourne's western suburbs and served there until she was posted to Mount Thomas. Upon her arrival in town, Maggie was called into action even before her first shift when her new landlady, Chris Riley (Julie Nihill), asked for help when one of her kitchen staff arrived at the pub in the middle of the night claiming she'd been raped.

On her way to work the following morning, Maggie got her first taste of the town's attitude to a female constable when she was heckled by a couple of local men. After reporting for duty, her first day was a whirlwind which saw her shoot a vicious dog before saving the rape victim from a suicide attempt, and finished it off by exposing the rapist for what he truly was in the midst of a crowded pub.

Later that year, Maggie was out on a solo patrol when she intercepted a vehicle being driven erratically. The only occupants of the car were a local member of parliament (MP), Ken Forbes, and his press liaison, Glenn Ritchie. Forbes had been driving, but refused to undertake a breath test and insisted on talking to her boss. Back at the station, Forbes finally took the breath analysis and was found to be nearly twice the legal limit, but both men insisted that Maggie was mistaken and Glenn had been driving. Maggie insisted on going through with the charges, backed up by Tom Croydon (John Wood), and was soon put under intense pressure from several sources to drop the case, which resulted in her father, Pat (Dennis Miller), coming to help. When she was forced to move out of the pub by Inspector Ted Faulkner, Pat took matters into his own hands, and "convinced" Glenn of the wisdom of telling the truth, who in turn convinced Forbes to take the rap.

Following the completion of her probation period, Maggie applied for a trainee vacancy with the St Davids Criminal Investigation Branch (CIB), which would be the first step on the road to becoming a detective, however she was beaten out by Rose Egan (Dale Stevens) who then completed the trainee-ship at Mount Thomas under the tutelage of P. J. Hasham (Martin Sacks).

During the second season, Maggie found herself in trouble when her gun-belt was stolen after she discarded it in order to save a boy who was apparently drowning. The police were faced with the prospect of children in possession of a loaded weapon which had been modified to require less pressure to pull the trigger, a nightmare waiting to happen. With the Inspector on their backs, her colleagues faced a race against time to find the gun before the worst could happen. When the gun found its way into the hands of a young child, only pure luck prevented a tragic end.

When IID raided the houses of several Mount Thomas police officers later that year, Maggie was one of the two officers not targeted in the raid. With one of the investigators being her brother Mick (David Field), she was torn between her relationship with her brother, and her loyalty to her colleagues. The news of a crashed prison bus saw Maggie manning a checkpoint on one of the roads out of town and, after her boss is shot while negotiating with a hostage taker, she found herself at the hospital and faced with the mastermind of the escape. Some quick thinking allowed her to single-handedly take down two criminals and rescue an abducted paramedic.

At Tom Croydon's annual Christmas party that year, everything appeared to have gone well, at least until Maggie discovered her friend Gina Belfanti (Rachel Blakely) had been raped on her way home from the party. Although the investigation uncovered the fact that she had sex with Adam Cooper (Damian Walshe-Howling) at the party, he was discounted as a suspect and the police decided to use Maggie as bait for the rapist. Heading home after the operation was called off, she found herself face-to-face with the rapist but was able to hold him off until Gina came to her aid.

During the third season, Maggie's father and two brothers arrived in town to celebrate her 25th birthday, but the celebration looked like it might be put on hold when a bag of heroin went missing in the middle of a station full of cops. Luckily, the bag had seemingly just been misplaced, and the party went on as scheduled. The next morning, Maggie and her father took part in a raid on a suspected drug house, where they found the last thing they could've expected: Robbie (David Wenham) unconscious from an overdose. Later, they realised that Robbie had stolen some of the heroin from the station and, after briefly considering covering-up, the whole family went down to the station and had him charged. As Pat left to take Robbie to a drug rehabilitation clinic, the whole family resolved to support him.

In early 1997, the Mount Thomas district was gripped by fears that cattle were dying from mad cow disease, and the tension sky-rocketed when the first cases were reported in humans. Two people were already dead, including Gina Belfanti, when Maggie was brought into the hospital with exactly the same symptoms as the dead women. The autopsies for the two dead women identified the cause of death as encephalitis and an investigation found it to be the Japanese strain, but P. J. realised that Maggie couldn't be infected because of the 5 to 15-day incubation period: she'd only been to the host farm more recently than that. After retracing her steps with Adam's help, P. J. discovered that Maggie had been bitten by a tick. With Dr. Zoe Hamilton's help, the tick was removed and eventually Maggie made a full recovery.

Later that year, Maggie and P. J. were drawn into an investigation at the local gold mine when Adam and new constable Dash McKinley (Tasma Walton) found prospector Hec O'Farrell in the mine, despite him no longer holding the lease. Hec's mate, Bert, is found bashed and their jar of gold dust is missing, with P. J. believing that Hec had taken the gold himself, but Tom and Dash are skeptical. The investigation took an unexpected turn when the new miners, Matt Kinsella and Jamie Burgess, discovered a nugget of gold just when the police are on hand to play witness. A routine check into the men's backgrounds uncovers the fact that both men were guards on duty during a bullion robbery. With this information in hand, Maggie and P. J. return to the mine to investigate, only to be trapped by a cave-in caused by an explosion. Trapped in close quarters together, they finally have a chance to explore a side of their relationship which they'd been suppressing for a long time.

While waiting for rescue, the trapped couple discussed, among other things, their hopes and dreams for the future while managing to stay hydrated thanks to water dripping from the mine ceiling. Through mere chance, and a discarded Minties wrapper, Dash and Adam realised that their colleagues were trapped in the mine while searching for Kinsella and Burgess. The rescue was complicated by the fact that the blast which caused the cave-in had made the rest of the tunnel unstable, but the State Emergency Service volunteers managed to extricate them both before the roof caved-in completely. Once free of the mine, Maggie and P. J. were set on nailing the two men for the bullion robbery, and for attempted murder, only to learn that Burgess' partner had killed Kinsella, and tried to kill Burgess.

In September of that year, Maggie's brother Robbie (now played by Brett Climo) returned to Mount Thomas for the first time since finishing rehab. Meanwhile, she encountered Gavin Stone driving a seriously un-roadworthy car, but initially decided to give him a warning and a chance to get the car repaired. She later found him driving the vehicle again, and was forced to write it off as defective. When she continued refusing to certify the vehicle as roadworthy, Gavin's father Arthur claimed that she was persecuting them. Gavin later solved his transportation problem by borrowing a motorbike, but was killed in an accident while going back to the farm for a helmet for a passenger. Arthur Stone was furious, and blamed Maggie for his son's death, so when her car was vandalised, he was the obvious suspect. The real culprit, Gavin's girlfriend, managed to surprise Maggie and was planning to have her drive head-on into a wall, but was prevented from doing so when Robbie arrived on the scene.

For the rest of the season, Maggie was faced with the prospect that Robbie might be back on heroin and was eventually forced to make the heartbreaking decision to arrest him again on drugs charges, with the likely result being his incarceration.

Shortly after she was appointed acting sergeant during the fifth season, Maggie was left reeling when Robbie turned up her doorstep in the middle of a storm, having escaped from gaol with just a couple of weeks left to run on his sentence. She tried to arrest him, but he threw her against the coffee table and fled. With Robbie still on the loose, Tom decided to have Maggie work out of the normally closed Widgeree Police Station during the annual powerboat festival to keep her away from the investigation. Within minutes of arriving in town, she was plunged headfirst into a fight for survival with Samuel, a young boy in witness protection, against a crazed man, Hank, after being forced to surrender her gun. After hiding in an old hut, they were discovered by Hank, who knocked Maggie unconscious after Samuel was able to escape. Ultimately, she was found by Robbie and P. J. but events ended in tragedy when Robbie took a bullet meant for his sister and died in her arms, while P. J. disarmed Hank and wrestled him to the ground.

Early in 1999, Maggie and Dash McKinley were handed a delicate case involving an alleged sexual assault at the local retirement home. The victim is in the early stages of Alzheimer's disease and claims her assailant was the devil, leading some people to dismiss her claims. The two female Heelers are more inclined to believe the victim though, especially after they discover devil masks at the local video store. The case took an ugly turn when Maggie was attacked and soon the town was in an uproar. The assailant is eventually unmasked during the course of another attack but escapes to his hideout, and it is up to Maggie to overcome her fears and lead her colleagues there.

Later in the year, Maggie's father arrived in town and started sniffing around the victim of a road rage incident. The victim, an antiques dealer, is revealed to be the man who got her brother Robbie onto drugs, and Maggie finds herself in the crossfire of a family argument when her brother Mick arrives in town and takes over the accident investigation. When the dealer shows up dead, P. J. wonders if Pat had something to do with it, leading to Maggie insisting on some time apart. Against the wishes of her father and P. J., Maggie begins a dogged pursuit of the drug ring which killed Robbie.

As her pursuit of the ring continued, Maggie suddenly went missing in the wake of the revelation that a crooked cop was supporting the syndicate. With her name in the frame as the culprit, P. J.'s emotional response to her disappearance reveals that their relationship was far more than professional. News arrived that Maggie was meeting with a new dealer, but by the time the Heelers arrived on the scene, her car was already in flames, with a charred body inside. Fortunately, the body wasn't Maggie's, but with someone wanting her dead, it was clear that she would need to enter witness protection for her own safety.

After she returned from six weeks in the witness protection program, Maggie began having doubts about her relationship with P. J. when she witnesses the differing approaches of P. J. and their colleague Ben Stewart (Paul Bishop) to the case of a sick child and her parents. This comes to a head when P. J. puts himself in Maggie's line of fire in a misplaced attempt to protect her, leading her to tell him that he needs to stop smothering her.

Over the following months, Maggie is indecently assaulted by a politician and later drugged by a jealous woman at an idyllic commune, all while developing a mutual attraction towards Ben, with more than a little nudge from Ben's youngest daughter, Emma. Eventually, P. J. tells Maggie that he will stand aside to allow her to explore a relationship with Ben, but changes his mind and proposes to her after an altercation with a group of Y2K survivalists.

The engagement proved to be short-lived, however, when bent copper Barry Craig was killed in prison after doing a deal with Maggie. The deal included the names of everyone involved in the syndicate, including several cops, and she was now in danger. When her house is torched, it became clear that she needed to return to witness protection. Despite P. J.'s demands to go with her, her brother Mick (now played by Terry Serio) organises for her enter the program alone. On her last day in Mount Thomas before returning to protective custody, Maggie was gunned down by an unknown assailant and died in P. J.'s arms when he arrived on the scene.

P. J. was initially fingered for the murder by a witness and the disappearance of his service weapon from the safe, but the case quickly fell apart, leaving P. J. free and determined to find the true killer. After a long investigation, P. J. and Pat confront the killer, uncovering an unimaginable act of betrayal: the killer is her brother Mick. With Maggie avenged, and the last of Pat's children now dead, the two men closest to her are able to grieve properly, scattering her ashes over the landscape outside Mount Thomas.

=== Rank ===
Maggie joined the Victoria Police in 1991. At the beginning of the series in 1994, she held the rank of Constable.

Constable	"A Woman's Place" (Season 1) — "King of Hearts" (Season 5)
Senior; Constable	"When Love's Not Enough" (Season 5) — "All in the Family"
Acting; Sergeant	"All in the Family" (Season 5) — "End of the Road" (Season 6)
Senior; Constable	"The Good Life" (Season 6) — "One Day More" (Season 7)

== Relationships ==
=== Romance ===
Maggie never married, but was briefly engaged before her death:

- P. J. Hasham (Martin Sacks) was Maggie's on-again-off-again romantic partner and eventual fiancé. Although they often butted heads when their theories on cases didn't match up, Maggie was P. J.'s most frequent investigative partner after her arrival at the station. Their relationship turned romantic after they were trapped together overnight in an old goldmine. After initially hiding their relationship for fear of being transferred, they finally announced their engagement in 1999. The engagement ended just two episodes later, however, as Maggie was gunned down on the brink of entering the Witness Protection Program.

During the first season, Maggie was shown to have a previous romantic relationship with Wayne Patterson (Grant Bowler), a classmate at the Academy who became her colleague at Mount Thomas. She also had brief relationships with Glenn Ritchie (Jeremy Callaghan), the press liaison for a local politician, and Sean Neale (Richard Huggett), a detective based in St Davids. In later seasons, she shared a kiss with Ben Stewart (Paul Bishop), but this relationship was limited to a few dates before Maggie became engaged to P. J. shortly before her death.

=== Family ===
Of all the characters in Blue Heelers, Maggie has one of the best known family backgrounds. Her father, Pat Doyle (Dennis Miller, is a frequently recurring character throughout the first seven seasons of the show, often arriving in Mount Thomas after hearing that his daughter needs help. Pat is Maggie's idol, and is a widower and old school police officer who retires as a sergeant. Although he dotes on Maggie, Pat has shown a tendency towards "tough love" when it comes to his two sons.

Maggie's eldest brother, Mick Doyle (David Field, later Terry Serio), first appears when the Internal Investigations Division (IID), with whom he is a detective sergeant, arrives in Mount Thomas and raids the home of her colleagues. Mick is shown to be very close with his sister, calling her "Mitsy", with this closeness causing tension with both their father, and with Maggie's colleagues, all of whom resent the fact that Mick is a member of the "toe-cutters". Despite their closeness, it is revealed during the seventh season that Mick is responsible for his sister's murder.

Maggie's younger brother, Robbie Doyle (David Wenham, later Brett Climo), was also a police officer, and was a senior constable serving in a mainly administrative position when he was dismissed after being charged with the theft of heroin from Mount Thomas and related drugs charges. Robbie continued to recur on the show until his character's death, with Maggie putting her career on the line for him several times as he went through drug rehabilitation. After he relapsed again, Maggie was forced to arrest him, resulting in his incarceration. He later escaped from gaol, again putting Maggie's career in jeopardy, before being killed by an armed assailant while protecting his sister.

=== Friends and colleagues ===
Over the course of some six years in Mount Thomas, Maggie is shown to have developed friendships, or at least close acquaintances, with a number of local personalities. Like most of her colleagues, she has a strong friendship with Chris Riley (Julie Nihill), a shire councillor and the publican of the Imperial Hotel, the local "watering hole" used by the local police. Chris is Maggie's landlord when she first moves into town, and remains a close friend and confidante after Maggie is forced to move out by pressure from superior officers.

For around three years, Maggie's closest friend was her roommate, Gina Belfanti (Rachel Blakely), a local paramedic whose work often crossed path with that of the police before her death, which came after contracting Japanese encephalitis.

Despite initially finding her boss, Tom Croydon (John Wood), to be gruff and something of a chauvinist, Maggie proved herself to be an excellent copper, which in turn gained her more respect from Tom. Over time, this respect developed into something of a father-daughter dynamic and Maggie came to look at Tom like a second father, though he remained willing to offer stern counsel on the rare occasions that Maggie made a mistake.

Maggie was friendly with all her colleagues, even the occasionally dour Nick Schultz (William McInnes), but found her closest friendship with fellow female officer Dash McKinley (Tasma Walton). Despite the age difference between them, Maggie and Dash bonded over their shared experiences as females in a male-dominated workplace. Following Gina's death, Dash became Maggie's roommate, sharing a house with her until she decided to leave Mount Thomas in the aftermath of her mother's death. With Dash gone, Maggie's new female colleague is Jo Parrish (Jane Allsop), but the two have little time together to begin bonding before Maggie is gunned down.

For a lot of her career, Maggie's family connections – to her father, the "old school" sergeant, and her brother, the "toe-cutter" – complicated her relationships with her fellow officers. Despite having a strong sense of pride in being a cop, Maggie found herself despising her profession on more than one occasion, describing the force as a "boys' club" after being pressured by her superiors to move out of her room at the Imperial Hotel while she was pursuing charges against a politician.

== Personality ==
The character of Maggie Doyle was initially conceived as a strong, opinionated woman who had little time for the outdated and chauvinistic views of her male colleagues and many of the townspeople who were not used to female police officers. Coming from a police family, she deeply believed in the ideals which the police uniform should stand for, and frequently took it personally when she perceived that a fellow copper has disgraced that uniform. Despite her police heritage, Maggie is shown making her fair share of mistakes, which sometimes have the potential for serious consequences, including one time where her decision to leave her gun belt unattended to help what she thinks is a drowning youth almost ended in the death of a child.

Maggie's attention to detail, interpersonal skills and stubbornness made her character a perfect foil for that of P. J. Hasham and they were frequently paired together on investigations. As the only female officer for the first two and a half seasons, Maggie is usually called upon to perform the roles which need a softer touch, like dealing with babies and young children, but she isn't one to shy away from wading into the middle of a brawling crowd. As the series went on, Maggie also filled the role of mentor to the less experienced constables joining the station, in particular the new female constables.

Maggie is an idealist and a feminist, willing on more than one occasion to put her career on the line to expose corruption and chauvinism, including at least two occasions where she brings charges against politicians who are very different to their public personas. Although higher-ups have tried to convince her to back down on more than one occasion, Maggie is nothing if not stubborn and this bloody-minded determination comes to the fore when she investigates the drug ring she believes led to her brother's death.

== Reception ==
Although Blue Heelers was not expected to become a popular programme, the show became a hit shortly after it began airing, with much of this success credited to the quality of the ensemble cast, including Lisa McCune as Maggie Doyle.

During her time on Blue Heelers, McCune was nominated for twelve individual Logie Awards. After winning the Silver Logie Award for Most Popular New Talent at the 1995 ceremony, McCune was nominated for the Silver Logie Award for Most Popular Actress each year from 1996 until 2000, winning the award on all five occasions. Additionally, she was nominated for the Gold Logie Award for Most Popular Personality on Australian Television on six consecutive occasions between 1996 until 2001, winning the award four times in succession between 1997 until 2000. She was also nominated three times at the People's Choice Awards, being nominated for Favourite Actress in a Drama or Serial in 1998, and Favourite TV Star in both 1998 and 1999, winning both awards in 1998.

As a result of her time on the show, McCune rapidly progressed from being relatively unknown to being one of the most recognisable, and popular, faces on Australian television. At the height of the show's popularity, as many as 4 million viewers tuned in to watch her will-they-won't-they romance with Martin Sacks' P. J. Hasham on a weekly basis. The relationship culminated in Maggie's death in what remains one of the most iconic moments in Australian television history.
