= Tess Gallagher (Blue Heelers) =

- Blue Heelers character
- First appearance: "On the Road"; 24 May 2000
- Last appearance: "Motherhood"; 10 September 2003
- Portrayed by: Caroline Craig

In-universe information
- Occupation: Police Sergeant
- Spouse: Josh Carmichael (divorced)
- Children: Hayley Fulton (foster)
- Relatives: Denise Pattrucci (mother); Bridie Gallagher (sister)

Tess Gallagher is a fictional character from the Australian police procedural television series Blue Heelers, portrayed by Caroline Craig. She made her debut in the seventh series episode "On the Road", broadcast on 24 May 2000.

== Casting ==
Craig's casting was publicised in the 4–10 March 2000 issue of TV Week. John Burfitt confirmed that her character was a replacement for the recently departed Maggie Doyle, played by Lisa McCune. Craig, who graduated from NIDA a few months before being cast, began filming that same week. Of finding Maggie's replacement, producer Ric Pellizzeri stated: "We looked for someone who is special and can play well the character we have created. Blue Heelers deals with a lot of emotional issues, and Caroline suited all of our requirements."

== Storylines ==
The character arrived shortly after Maggie Doyle's death. She arrives as the new Sergeant at Mount Thomas, taking Ben Stewart's assumed position. This and her emotionally withdrawn and critical character initially fuels animosity between her and her colleagues. She eventually earns the department's respect, particularly by her colleague Senior Detective P.J. Hasham and her boss Senior Sergeant Tom Croydon.

Tess' family is disjointed and hectic and leads her to adopt a survivalist attitude. Her mother is an ignorant and misguided individual who cared little for her five children. Tess mentions that she has three brothers (although this is never confirmed) and one sister named Bridie, all of whom she supposedly raised throughout her own childhood.

Tess' upbringing served to mould her into a determined and successful individual both attaining a Master of Business Administration (MBA) and the role of Senior Detective at Shepparton in Regional Victoria.

Tess' emotional withdrawal eventuates in a number of a failed relationships throughout the series. Her initial love interest, Probationary Constable Jack Lawson, although significantly younger than her manages to win her trust and convinces her to momentarily dispose of her cynical outlook toward men and committed relationship. This trust is soon destroyed as Jack is charged for the murder of a suspect and is seen to show no remorse for his action. Jack is replaced by Constable Evan Jones to whom Tess takes an immediate interest but is also taken aback by his relentless foolhardiness. As the Constable's interest in his Sergeant grows from an initial admiration to love, Tess is cautious with her relationship to the Constable and often harshly although reluctantly dismisses any form of affection from Jones that could potentially endanger her pseudo stable existence. The potential of a relationship with Jones scares Tess into marrying the rogue Doctor Josh Carmicheal. Josh's concealed homosexuality and criminal habit of stealing pethidine for a former schoolboy lover results in Tess' decision to divorce her husband. Jones is seen to support Tess both through her divorce with her husband and effective pregnancy with Josh's child by offering to marry her. Tess' history of failed relationship deemed this unwise but Tess does hold a firm friendship with Jones throughout her pregnancy until her final departure due to her contraction of pre-eclampsia.

Although Tess is originally seen as a volatile character there are instances during the series that showcase her vulnerability as a human being. Her empathy toward a truant child Hayley who also suffers a tormenting childhood see Tess foster the child and consider her adoption although this doesn't eventuate. Tess' eventual pregnancy also portrays her vulnerability as she faces the decision to either terminate her unborn child or potentially die.

Tess departs from the series due to the risk of untreated pre-eclampsia. Her departure effectively resulted in her reconciliation with her longtime estranged mother Denise. Ironically, this bond would fall into effect with Gallagher's long term decision of leaving the police force and going onto raise her unborn child alone.

== Reception ==
For her portrayal of Tess, Craig earned a nomination for the Logie Award for Most Popular New Female Talent in 2001.
