= Caroline Craig =

Australian actress

- Born: 30 April 1975 (age 51); Melbourne, Victoria, Australia
- Occupations: Actress, director
- Years active: 2000–present

Caroline Craig (born 30 April 1975 in Melbourne, Victoria, Australia) is an Australian actress, based in Melbourne. Caroline completed a BA at Melbourne University before graduating from NIDA (National Institute of Dramatic Art) in 1999.

== Career ==
=== Television ===
Caroline first appeared as series regular Sergeant Tess Gallagher in Channel Seven's drama series Blue Heelers (2000 - 2003). In 2008 she appeared as Detective Jacqui James in Underbelly, and has since narrated the Underbelly series for Channel Nine. Most recently she played the role of Matron Grace Wilson in the ABC1 mini series ANZAC Girls, which screened in 2014.

On 5 March 2026, Craig was named in the cast for series three of Stan series Black Snow.

=== Stage ===
Since graduating from NIDA, Caroline has worked for Melbourne Theatre Company, Sydney Theatre Company, State Theatre Company of South Australia, Bell Shakespeare Company, Malthouse Theatre, Melbourne and Griffin Theatre Company. Caroline has also directed a number of independent theatre productions including S-27 for Griffin Independent. In 2013 Caroline performed in Yes, Prime Minister, touring Australia and New Zealand.

In 2022, Craig appeared in the titular role of Anna K in Anna K for the Malthouse Theatre's 2022 season..

== Filmography ==
Television
Year	Title	Role	Notes	Ref
2000– 2003	Blue Heelers	Sgt. Teresa "Tess" Gallagher	139 episodes	
2005	The Heartbreak Tour	Jack	TV movie	
2007	Bastard Boys	Tali Bernard	TV mini-series	
2006– 2007	Orange Roughies	Chloe Meachem	8 episodes	
2007	Little Deaths	Vanessa		
2008– 2013	Underbelly	Jacqui James / Narrator	34+ episodes	
2010	Sleuth 101	Bridget Wilmott	Episode 4	
2010	ICU	Narrator	TV series	
2011	Underbelly Files: Tell Them Lucifer was Here	Jacqui James / Narrator		
2011	Rescue Special Ops	Sheree O'Brien	Episode 12	
2012	Dangerous Remedy	Barbara Wainer	TV movie	
2014	ANZAC Girls	Matron Grace Wilson	6 episodes	
2019	The Hunting	Stephanie	Episode 4	
2023	Missing Persons Investigation	Narrator	TV series	
2026	High Country	Rochelle	TV series	
2027	Black Snow	TBA	TV series	

=== Film appearances ===
Year	Title	Role	Notes	Ref
2022	Assets	Bravo	Short film	
2021	Roborovski	Anita	Short film	
2020	Bloody Hell	Mother		
2019	151 Ludlow	Clarance	Short	
2011	Glossy	Various	Short	
2005	The Opposite of Velocity	Karen	Short	

== Theatre ==
Year	Title	Role	Notes	Ref
2023	Prima Facie		State Theatre, South Australia	
2022	Anna K	Anna K	Malthouse Theatre	
2018	Creditors	Tekla	State Theatre	
2011	Speaking in Tongues	Jane	SBW Theatre	
