= Rupert Reid =

Australian actor

- Born: Australia
- Occupation: Actor
- Years active: 1987–present
- Relatives: Sam Reid (brother)

Rupert Reid is an Australian actor, known for his roles as Declan Costello in the television series Heartbreak High from 1996 until 1997, and Constable Jack Lawson in the police drama series Blue Heelers from 1999 until 2001. After returning from Los Angeles in 2013, Reid had a supporting role in Winners & Losers as Rob Hill, took over the role of Krez "Pav" Pavlovic in The Heights, and played Marvin in children's television show The Gamers 2037.

== Early life ==
Reid was born near Canberra, but raised in Sydney. He is the son of actress Kate Reid, who appeared in Rafferty's Rules. His parents separated amicably when he was young. He has five siblings from his parents' three marriages, including actor Sam Reid. When he was a teenager, Reid decided to pursue an acting career despite his mother advising him to become a plumber instead.

== Career ==
Reid played Declan Costello in Heartbreak High for a year from 1996 until 1997. After several months out of work, he joined the main cast of Blue Heelers as Constable Jack Lawson in September 1998. He relocated to Melbourne for the role. Sue Williams of The Sydney Morning Herald named Reid as one of the "next big stars" due to his role as Jack and his popularity with viewers. Reid appeared in the 2003 films The Matrix Revolutions and The Matrix Reloaded as Lock's lieutenant. He also appeared in the 2005 television film Small Claims: The Wedding.

Reid left Australia to secure film and television work in Los Angeles. He attended a number of auditions and worked on his acting skills. In 2013, he secured a guest appearance in an episode of NCIS. He returned to Australia that same year and filmed a pilot for the Seven Network called Hartman's Solution, which starred Erik Thomson. However, the show was not picked up. In 2015, Reid joined the supporting cast of the Seven Network drama Winners & Losers as school physical education teacher Rob Hill, who became a love interest for Sam MacKenzie (Katherine Hicks). It marked Reid's first major television role in a decade.

Reid wrote and directed the short film Boo, which was a finalist at Tropfest in 2012. He later worked with actor Tom Oakley to write and direct short film Talk to Someone. The film was inspired by the suicides of six of Oakley's male friends and was made to raise awareness. In 2017, Reid appeared in three episodes of the miniseries Sunshine. He also guested in Home and Away in 2019. In 2020, Reid was cast as Krez "Pav" Pavlovic in the second season of ABC serial drama The Heights. He took over the role from Marcus Graham, who could not return to the series because of a schedule conflict. Reid went on to play Marvin in The Gamers 2037.

== Filmography ==
=== Film ===
Year	Title	Role	Notes
1987	Pandemonium	Child Witness	
1998	The Sugar Factory	Bruce Kyle	
1999	Kick	Sinkers	
2003	The Extreme Team	Dillion	
2003	The Matrix Reloaded	Lock's Lieutenant	
2003	The Matrix Revolutions	Lock's Lieutenant	
2011	Another Earth	Keith Harding	
2013	The Jungle	Larry	
2013	Past God	Will	
2015	Super Awesome!	Charlie	
2023	The Big Dog	Kevin	

=== Television ===
Year	Title	Role	Notes
1996–1997	Heartbreak High	Declan Costello	33 episodes
1997	Water Rats	Jens	Episode: "Hunting Season"
1998	Meteorites!	Nurse Ben	TV film
1999–2001	Blue Heelers	Const. Jack Lawson	Main role
2003	White Collar Blue	Shane Duggan	5 episodes
2004	The Mystery of Natalie Wood	Henry Jaglom	TV film
2005	Small Claims: The Wedding	David	TV film
2013	NCIS	Noah	Episode: "Chasing Ghosts"
2015	Winners & Losers	Rob Hill	10 episodes
2015	Australia: The Story of Us	Ken Crane	Episode: "Risky Business"
2015	Mary: The Making of a Princess	Chris Meehan	TV film
2016	Brock	Norman Gown	Episode #1.1
2016	Black Comedy	Guest	Episode #2.6
2017	Sunshine	Ben Canny	Miniseries, 3 episodes
2017	Cleverman	Chief of Staff	Episode: "Revival"
2017	Hoges: The Paul Hogan Story		Episode #1.1
2019	Home and Away	Samuel Collins	3 episodes
2019	Reef Break	Dr. Benjamin	Episode: "The Comeback"
2020	The Heights	Krez "Pav" Pavlovic	30 episodes
2020	Reckoning	Emilio Hobbs	4 episodes
2020–2021	The Gamers 2037	Marvin	21 episodes
2021	Harrow	Derek Moore	Episode: "Sola Dosis Facit Venemum"
2022	Barons	Hayden	Episode: "The Dream Factory"
2024	Prosper	Robbie Ratten	2 episodes

=== Video game ===
Year	Title	Role	Notes
2003	Enter the Matrix	Lock's Lieutenant	
