= Jane Allsop =

Australian actress

Jane Claire Allsop
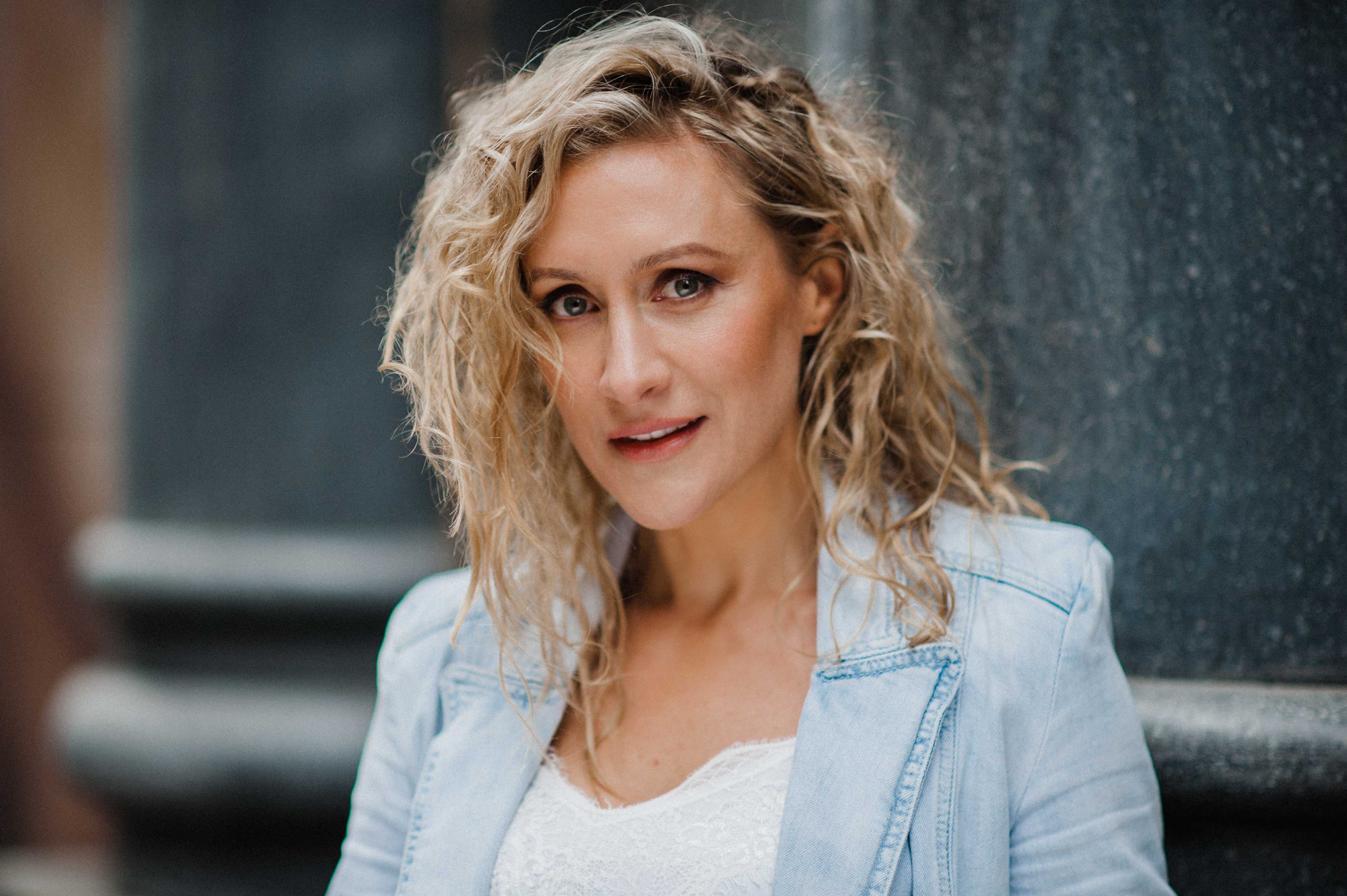
- Allsop in 2020
- Born: Oxford, England
- Occupation: Actress
- Spouse: David Serafin (m. 2014)
- Children: 4
- Website: www.janeallsop.com.au

Jane Claire Allsop is an English Australian actress, best known for her role as Jo Parrish on Blue Heelers.

== Early life ==
Allsop was born in the United Kingdom, and only a few months after her birth moved to the United States with her parents, John and Helen Allsop. When Allsop was two and a half years old, her family settled in Mont Albert in Melbourne, Australia. She attended Strathcona Primary School and Melbourne Girls Grammar.

She began drama classes at age nine in Box Hill, and at thirteen she starred in a Wedgewood Pies commercial, where she wore a bright green bikini and was only on screen for a small segment.

Allsop began studying for an Arts Degree but dropped out. She was accepted into the Victoria College of the Arts in 1995 and studied for a visual and performing arts degree.

== Career ==
Whilst studying, Allsop guest starred on television series such as Neighbours (1995), Blue Heelers (1997) and Halifax f.p. (1998). After graduating in 1998, Allsop returned to Neighbours as a different character for several months.

In 1999 Allsop landed her breakthrough role. She auditioned for Blue Heelers and won the lead role of Constable Jo Parrish. Over the next 5 years, she would become one of Blue Heelers all-time most popular characters, winning a Logie Award for the Most Popular New Female Talent in 2000, and receiving a nomination for a Silver Logie for Most Popular Actress in 2005. She played the role until 2004, after which time she left to pursue further career options. Her character was killed off in a bombing, which was used as part of a major revamp of the show.

After Blue Heelers, the next notable role for Allsop was a guest role in the ABC's MDA. Allsop played Lucy Morello, partner of Andrew Morello who have decided to use IVF to become pregnant. In 2005, Allsop appeared in the children's TV show Holly's Heroes for one episode as Abby Dawson. Also during 2005, Allsop guest starred on Last Man Standing.

In one of the first roles after the birth of her first son, Indiana, Allsop portrayed TV actress and comedian Noeline Brown in the 2007 tele-movie, The King: The Story of Graham Kennedy. During the same year, Allsop guest starred on Neighbours as Diana Murray, a barrister working with Toadfish Rebecchi (Ryan Moloney) and Rosetta Cammeniti (Natalie Saleeba) on a legal case. Allsop appeared in ten episodes.

Allsop was then cast in 2010 drama feature Matching Jack, alongside Jacinda Barrett, playing the role of Marianne. The movie premiered at the 2010 Melbourne International Film Festival before going on to wider release in August 2010.

Allsop also had recurring roles in Rush and Tangle from 2010. She appeared in Underbelly Files: Tell Them Lucifer was Here and drama miniseries The Slap in 2011. She had a supporting role in House Husbands and the miniseries Devil's Dust in 2012. She then joined House Husbands as a main cast member.

Allsop played Felicity in two seasons of the ABC series Rake. In 2018 she was in Underbelly Files: Chopper and True Story with Hamish & Andy.

== Personal life ==
Jane Allsop is married to actor David Serafin, whom she met in acting class at age 13 but did not start dating until years later. Serafin had guest roles on Blue Heelers during Jane's time on the show in 2001 and 2003. In May 2006, Allsop had their first son, Indiana Zac Serafin, and in May 2008 had their second, Jagger Zed Serafin. They had twin girls in December 2016. The couple were married in July 2014.

In 2021 Allsop founded and launched "Zoe & Zara", a makeup line focused on organic products, free from palm oil. In 2024, Zoe & Zara was rebranded to Xoe and the Fox.

== Filmography ==
=== Television ===
Year	Title	Role	Notes	Ref
1995	Neighbours	Samantha Spry	2 episodes	
1997	Kangaroo Palace	Cecily	TV film	
1997	Blue Heelers	Angie Henderson	Episode: "Fool For Love"	
1998	Halifax f.p.	Lauper's Girlfriend	Episode: "Afraid of the Dark"	
1998	State Coroner	Kirsty Wilson	Episode: "Sunday in the Country"	
1998	Driven Crazy	Cinema Patron 2	Episode: "Noseweed"	
1998–1999	Neighbours	Shelley Harris/Hanson	2 episodes	
1999	The Adventures of Lano and Woodley	Teresa	Episode: "The Pool"	
1999–2004	Blue Heelers	Jo Parrish	Main cast, 202 episodes	
2005	MDA	Lucy Morello	4 episodes	
2005	Last Man Standing	Suzie	Episodes: "1.3, 1.8, 1.18, 1.22"	
2005	Holly's Heroes	Abby Dawson	Episode: "Stop the Clock"	
2007	Neighbours	Diana Murray	11 episodes	
2007	The King	Noeline Brown	TV film	
2009	City Homicide	Jo Andrews	Episode: "Rage"	
2010–2011	Rush	Tash Button	12 episodes	
2010–2012	Tangle	Tanya Hicks	12 episodes	
2011	Underbelly Files: Tell Them Lucifer was Here	Carmel Arthur	TV film	
2011	The Slap	Tracey	Episodes: "Connie", "Richie", "Aisha"	
2012	Devil's Dust	Eva Francis	Miniseries	
2012–2017	House Husbands	Rachel	Main cast, 26 episodes	
2013	Underbelly: Squizzy	Lady Margaret Stanley	Episode: "Squizzy Cooks a Goose"	
2014	INXS: Never Tear Us Apart	Pat Hutchence	Miniseries	
2014–2016	Rake	Felicity Finnane	6 episodes	
2015	The Doctor Blake Mysteries	Ruth Dempster	Episode: "My Brother’s Keeper"	
2015	Miss Fisher's Murder Mysteries	Delores	Episode: "Death & Hysteria"	
2015	The Divorce	Police Officer	Episode: "1.1"	
2018	Underbelly Files: Chopper	Detective Martin	Episode: "Part One", "Part Two"	
2018	True Story with Hamish & Andy	Carol's Mum	Episode: "Carol"	
2019	Ms Fisher's Modern Murder Mysteries	Shirley King	Episode: "Seasoned Murder"	
2020	Drunk History Australia	Sarah	Episode: "1.1"	
2020, 2022	Neighbours	Lisa Rowsthorn	Guest role	
2021	Metro Sexual	Amelia Krabb	4 episodes	
2023	Plausible Deniability	Kelly O'Leary	1 episode	
2023	Surviving Summer	Loopy	4 episodes	
2023	Heat	Louise Fisher	4 episodes	
2024	Human Error	Bianca	2 episodes	

=== Film ===
Year	Title	Role	Notes
2002	Guru Wayne	Jane White	Film
2006	The Deal	Tina	Short
2010	Matching Jack	Marianne	Feature film
2011	Golden Girl	Cilla's Mother	Short
2011	Attack	Carol	Short
2012	FH2: FagHag2000	Mary the Talk Show Host	Short
2014	You Cut, I Choose	Jill (27 years old)	Short
2014	Cherokee	Linda	Short
2016	The Menkoff Method	Nancy Mayer	Film
2025	One More Shot	Lynne	
