= Martin Sacks =

Australian actor (born 1959)

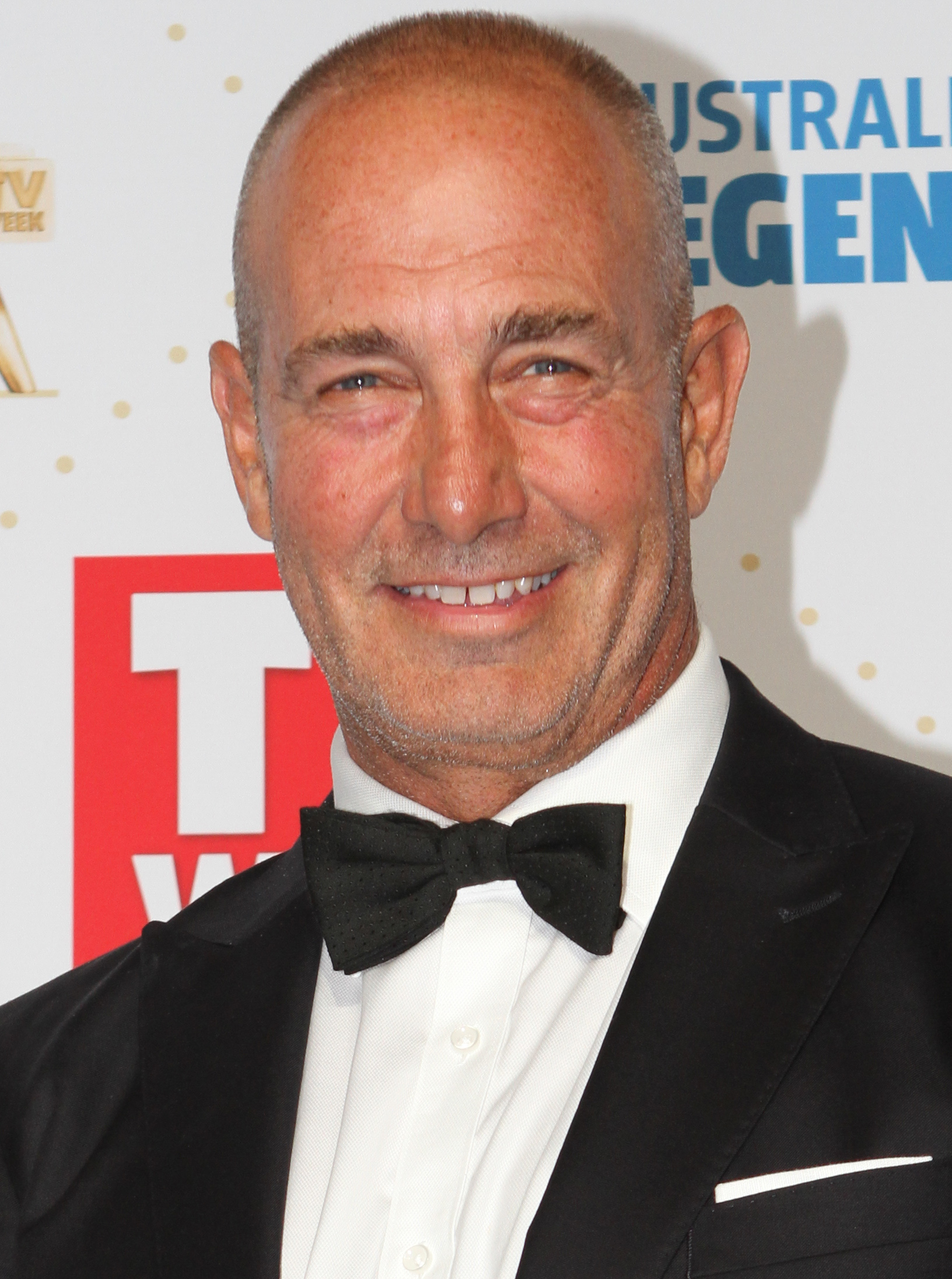
- Sacks attending the 2016 TV Week Logie Awards, May 2016
- Born: Martin Colin Sacks; 16 October 1959 (age 67); Sydney, Australia
- Occupations: Actor, director
- Years active: 1977–present
- Spouse: Kate Sacks (née Allen)
- Awards: 1998–2002: Silver Logie award for Most Popular Actor – for his role as PJ Hasham in Blue Heelers

Martin Colin Sacks (born 16 October 1959) is an Australian actor, perhaps best known for his 12-year role on Blue Heelers as P. J. Hasham from 1993 to 2005.

== Life and career ==
Sacks was born in Sydney. He got into acting after a bit part in an episode of The Love Boat when it was filming in the Pacific. His first role came about in the series The Restless Years in 1977, which started him on the television circuit in Australia. He emigrated to Hollywood in the 1980s, guest starring in series such as thirtysomething, but preferred Australia, and so he returned there after a few years. Also had guest appearances in: Love in Limbo, Encounters, Irresistible Force, Fields of Fire III, All the Way, Touch the Sun: Princess Kate, Slate, Wyn & Me, Sentiments, Emoh Ruo, Stock Squad and The City's Edge. Also Jake and the Fatman.

Sacks took the role of Detective P.J. Hasham in the 1993 series Blue Heelers. The show rocketed him to fame, most notably his 7-year "will-they-or-won't-they" relationship with Constable Maggie Doyle (Lisa McCune) which ended with her death in the programme's seventh season.

During the time he starred on the show, Sacks married Kate and had two children, Jack and Ned and had leading roles in two major Australian miniseries: Do or Die and My Husband, My Killer (both 2001).

After playing P.J. for twelve years, and being one of only three original cast still on the show in the twelfth season, Sacks left Blue Heelers in August 2005. Sacks asked the producers not to kill his character, so that he could return for a guest spot in the future. He did not get the chance, however: the show was cancelled in early 2006.

Sacks is also a director, having directed episodes of Blue Heelers, All Saints and a short film called Crushed.

Sacks also starred in the 2008 Australian TV hit, Underbelly, portraying underworld loanshark Mario Condello. In 2010, Sacks guest starred in three different shows – City Homicide, Rescue: Special Ops and Sea Patrol. In 2013 he appeared in Wentworth.

In 2025, Sacks was named in the cast for the upcoming Netflix series The Survivors. On 20 November 2025, Sacks was named in the cast for ABC series Dustfall.

On 8 October 2026, Sacks was named in the extended cast for the film Chiquita.

== Filmography ==
=== Film ===
Year	Title	Role	Notes	Ref
1983	The City's Edge	Youth at Party	Feature film	
1985	Stock Squad	Ric Santana	TV movie	
1985	Emoh Ruo	Des. Tunkley	Feature film	
1987	Slate, Wyn & Me	Slate Jackson	Feature film	
1988	Touch the Sun: Princess Kate	Greg Mathieson	TV movie	
1993	Irresistible Force	Bomb Squad Officer	Feature film	
1993	Love in Limbo	Max Wiseman	Feature film	
1993	Encounters	Martin Carr	Feature film	
2001	My Husband, My Killer	Andrew Kalajzich	TV movie	
2011	The Cup	Neil Pinner	Feature film	
2011	This Dog’s Life	Father	Short film	
2012	Bait 3D	Todd	Feature film	
2012	Jack Irish: Black Tide	Steve Levesque	TV movie	
2012	Island	Chris	Short film	
2012	Rise of the Underdog	Bridges	Short film	
2012	Blackbuster	Graham	Short film	
2013	Absolute Deception	Hank	Feature film	
2013	Cliffy	Syd	TV movie	
2014	Breath	Father	Short film	
2014	Rise	Jimmy Cove	Feature film	
2015	Truth	Robert Strong	Feature film	
2016	Hitch	The Man	Short film	
2016	Land to Vale	Narrator	Short film	
2017	The Kindness of Strangers	Man	Short film	
2017	Don't Tell	Tony	Feature film	
2018	The Second	The Brother	Feature film	
2019	Ride Like a Girl	Owner #2	Feature film	
2020	Sweet River	John Drake	Feature film	
2021	Buckley's Chance	Cooper	Feature film	
2022	Bosch & Rockit	Derek	Feature film	
2025	With or Without You	Stevo		
2027	Chiquita		Film	

=== Television ===
Year	Title	Role	Notes	Ref
1977	The Restless Years	Adam Lee	TV series	
1982	Cop Shop	Abel (Laurie Myers)	TV series. 2 episodes	
1982–84	A Country Practice	Craig Thompson/Philby	TV series. 6 episodes	
1987	Sentiments	Jeff	TV series	
1988	All the Way	Alan Scott	Miniseries, 3 episodes	
1989	Fields of Fire III	Rinaldo	Miniseries, 3 episodes	
1990	thirtysomething	Assistant Director	TV series, Season 3, episode 22	
1990	Jake and the Fatman	Halsey Reed	TV series, Season 4, episode 5	
1993	Police Rescue	Lloyd Cooper	TV series, Season 3, episode 4	
1993–2005	Blue Heelers	Senior Detective Patrick Joseph "P.J." Hasham	TV series, 484 episodes	
1997	Oz Encounter: UFOs in Australia	Host	Documentary	
1999	Carols in the Domain	Host	TV special	
2001	Do or Die (aka The Rubicon)	Jimmy Grattan	Miniseries	
2008	Underbelly	Mario Condello	TV series, 11 episodes	
2008	The Strip	Keith Boswell	TV series, Season 1, episode 5	
2009	East of Everything	Toby Ferrani	TV series, Season 2, episode 7	
2010	Lowdown	Tony Marino	TV series, Season 1, episode 7	
2010	City Homicide	Daniel Worthington	TV series, Season 3, episode 22	
2010	Sea Patrol	Derek Cavanaugh	TV series, Season 4, episode 16	
2010	Rescue Special Ops	Charles Howard	TV series, Season 2, episode 12	
2010	Offspring	Colin Soriel	TV series, 2 episodes	
2012	The Straits	Howard Reeman	Miniseries, 2 episodes	
2013	Reef Doctors	David	Miniseries, Episode: "Episode #1.9"	
2013	Air Rescue	Narrator	TV series, 6 episodes	
2014-15	Wonderland	Callan Beaumont	14 episodes	
2012, 2014	Rake	Roger Cross	TV series, 7 episodes	
2013–18	Wentworth	Derek Channing	TV series, 17 episodes	
2013–14, 2017	A Place to Call Home	Itzaak Goldberg	TV series, 5 episodes	
2014	The Gods of Wheat Street	Bobby Blackman	Miniseries, 3 episodes	
2015	The Doctor Blake Mysteries	Martin O’Brien	TV series, 1 episode	
2016	Brock	Geoff Brock	Miniseries, 2 episodes	
2017	The Laps Tasmania	Narrator	Documentary	
2018	Sisters		Online miniseries	
2022	Irreverent	Victor	Miniseries, 3 episodes	
2024	Darby and Joan	Doug Malcolm	TV series: guest	
2025	The Survivors	Julian Gilroy	TV series	
2026	Dustfall	Tony Morrison	TV series	

== Director ==
Year	Title	Notes
2005-2006	Blue Heelers	4 episodes
2006-2008	All Saints	6 episodes
	Crushed	Short film

== Accolades ==
Year	Association	Category	Work	Result	Ref
1996	Logie Award	Most Popular Actor	Blue Heelers	Nominated	
1997	Logie Award	Most Popular Actor	Blue Heelers	Won	
1998	Logie Award	Most Popular Actor	Blue Heelers	Won	
1999	Logie Award	Most Popular Actor	Blue Heelers	Won	
2000	Logie Award	Most Popular Actor	Blue Heelers	Won	
2001	Logie Award	Most Popular Actor	Blue Heelers	Won	
