= Blue Heelers season 9 =

Blue Heelers
- Season 9
- No. of episodes: 40

Release
- Original network: Seven Network
- Original release: 13 February – 20 November 2002

Season chronology
- ← Previous; Season 8 Next → Season 10

The ninth season of the Australian police-drama Blue Heelers premiered on the Seven Network on 13 February 2002 and aired on Wednesday nights at 8:30 pm. The 40-episode season concluded 20 November 2002. The main cast was unchanged from the previous season but for the departure of Rupert Reid as Jack Lawson. Similar to previous seasons, the ninth season was released on DVD as a two part set and as a complete set, both released on 3 November 2009.

== Casting ==
=== Main ===
- John Wood as Senior Sergeant Tom Croydon
- Julie Nihill as Christine 'Chris' Riley
- Martin Sacks as Senior Detective Patrick Joseph 'P.J.' Hasham
- Paul Bishop as Senior Constable Benjamin 'Ben' Stewart
- Jane Allsop as Constable Jo Parrish
- Caroline Craig as Sergeant Tess Gallagher
- Ditch Davey as Constable Evan Jones

=== Guests ===
- Ailsa Piper
- Alan David Lee
- John Orcsik
- Leslie Dayman
- Margot Knight
- Justine Saunders
- Jane Badler
- Elspeth Ballantyne
- Peter Sumner
- Shaunna O'Grady
- Kate Jason
- Alethea McGrath
- Marg Downey
- Monica Maughan
- Lois Collinder
- Annie Jones

== Reception ==
The season saw a decline in viewers, with 1.9 million from its usual 2.5 million.

== Episodes ==
No. overall	No. in season	Title	Directed by	Written by	Australian air date
337	1	"Breaking Point Part 1"	Denny Lawrence	Dave Worthington	13 February 2002
Everyone is pushed to the edge and Tom becomes a target when a boy's troubled past comes back to haunt him.
338	2	"Breaking Point Part 2"	Declan Eames	John Banas	20 February 2002
Tom and Tess risk losing the people they love in their desire to protect them.
339	3	"If It Ain't Hurtin'"	Fiona Banks	Bill Garner	27 February 2002
Jonesy must make a decision about his future when an old flame asks him to leave the force.
340	4	"Down in the Forest"	Roger Hodgman	David Allen	6 March 2002
Ben must fight to earn the trust of three desperate children.
341	5	"The Real Thing"	Daina Reid	Tom Hegarty	13 March 2002
Jo questions her feelings for her new boyfriend when their careers and values clash.
342	6	"Rainy Night Blues"	Fiona Banks	Abe Pogos	20 March 2002
Tess' past threatens to overcome her when Jonesy betrays her confidence.
343	7	"Jack and Jill"	Peter Sharp	Ysabelle Dean	27 March 2002
P.J.'s pride prevents his mother from speaking openly to him about his future.
344	8	"Sons and Mothers"	Ray Quint	Caroline Stanton	3 April 2002
P.J. cannot face the prospect of his mother's impending death.
345	9	"Say His Name"	Aarne Neeme	Tony Morphett	10 April 2002
P.J. faces the balance of life and death.
346	10	"The Perfect Life"	Ray Quint	Michaeley O'Brien	17 April 2002
The death of P.J.'s mother affects his judgement.
347	11	"Flushed"	Daina Reid	John Banas	24 April 2002
P.J.'s professional mistrust leads him to discover the darker truth behind a domestic dispute.
348	12	"Dancing on the Edge"	Peter Sharp	Bill Garner	1 May 2002
Ben Questions his police future when he is accused of assault.
349	13	"Those That Trespass"	Aarne Neeme	Rachel Lewis	8 May 2002
Sam Baxter, a troubled 15-year-old girl, is found breaking into her mother's store.
350	14	"Reflection"	Fiona Banks	Petra Graf	15 May 2002
There is celebration in Mt. Thomas as Tom gets a service medal for 30 years in the force.
351	15	"Buddies"	Denny Lawrence	David Allen	15 May 2002
Jo is convinced by Jonesy to cut a speeding fine.
352	16	"Broken Dreams"	Fiona Banks	Carol Williams	5 June 2002
An aspiring ballerina is injured in a car crash and Jo seeks justice.
353	17	"An Old Fashioned Man"	Chris Langman	David Boutland	12 June 2002
It is an interesting time in Mt Thomas for couples together and not together.
354	18	"Of Middle Eastern Appearance"	Geoffrey Nottage	Chris Corbett	19 June 2002
A friend of Jo's, science teacher Deniz Gulmez is accused of hurting Rufus Sedgwick, a boy in her class.
355	19	"The Best Man"	Denny Lawrence	Tony Morphett	26 June 2002
A domestic at the church finds Jonesy's mate's wedding coming to a standstill.
356	20	"Wednesday's Child"	Deborah Niski	Anne Melville	3 July 2002
After reports come in of a mysterious woman harassing young girls outside the primary school, Tess and Jonesy investigate the woman's claims that one of the girls at the school is her long lost daughter who was kidnapped as an infant 10 years earlier.
357	21	"Finders Keepers"	Ray Quint	Michaeley O'Brien	10 July 2002
Tess, Jonesy and PJ investigate after a car accident on a bush track is linked to the proceeds of a city armed robbery, the falling out of thieves and a couple of old farmers who just don't know what they have got themselves into.
358	22	"Burning Desire"	Fiona Banks	Fiona Banks	17 July 2002
Jo invites herself to live in PJ's house, but fails to let him know.
359	23	"Naked Lady"	Aarne Neeme	Peter Hepworth	24 July 2002
A private school teacher is found dead on the outskirts of town.
360	24	"Private Lives"	Steve Mann	David Allen	7 August 2002
Ben is personally affected by the tragic death of an infant in a motor accident.
361	25	"Inside Outside"	Deborah Niski	Rob George, Rachel Lewis	7 August 2002
PJ finds himself at loggerheads with Jo over her sympathy for a woman on work release from prison.
362	26	"The Last Jar"	Richard Frankland	Peter Dick	14 August 2002
Tess and Jonesy clash when a man accuses his estranged wife of trying to kill his girlfriend by poisoning her breakfast jam.
363	27	"Stewart Vs Stewart"	Chris Langman	Jane Allen	21 August 2002
Ben takes on the job of prosecuting a teenager accused of the heart breaking robbery of a grieving widower.
364	28	"Fishing For Dummies"	Declan Eames	John Banas	28 August 2002
Jonesy heads off for a relaxing fishing weekend, but it turns into a disaster when he falls into the river.
365	29	"Salvation Part 1"	Aarne Neeme	Tony Morphett, Caroline Stanton	4 September 2002
Tom's wedding plans are thrown into disarray when Grace's ex husband, Simon, arrives in town.
366	30	"Salvation Part 2"	Roger Hodgman	Tony Morphett, Caroline Stanton	4 September 2002
Tom seems to be his own worst enemy when he admits to a violent confrontation with Simon shortly before his death.
367	31	"In Another Place"	Geoffrey Nottage	Leon Saunders	18 September 2002
As Ben and Jo wrestle with the problems of an immigrant family new to Mt Thomas.
368	32	"Parenthood"	Esben Storm	Chris Corbett	25 September 2002
Tom finds parenthood is no easier the second time around.
369	33	"Boys Will Be Boys"	Daina Reid	Noel Maloney	2 October 2002
Tess and Jonesy disagree about how to deal with a gang of troublesome teenage boys.
370	34	"Deep Water"	Chris Langman	Bill Garner	9 October 2002
Ben is coaching a school swimming team and is surprised when one of the girls, Chloe, develops a crush on him.
371	35	"Nothing Personal"	Declan Eames	Ysabelle Dean	16 October 2002
Ben's re-involvement with his first wife Angela is complicated by the appearance of her jealous husband.
372	36	"Teamwork"	Richard Frankland	David Boutland	23 October 2002
After Jonesy crashes a police vehicle, Tess decides he needs to learn something about teamwork.
373	37	"Stable Mates"	Steve Mann	David Allen	30 October 2002
Jo is attending a counselling session, after shooting a man in the previous episode.
374	38	"Some Days"	George Ogilvie	Ted Roberts	6 November 2002
Evans brother, Dylan, helps with an investigation.
375	39	"Body of Evidence"	Chris Langman	Tony Morphett	13 November 2002
Jo and PJ heal their rift as they find themselves investigating a bizarre case.
376	40	"All You Need Is Love"	Peter Sharp	Leon Saunders	20 November 2002
Tess and Evan share a steamy kiss to end Blue Heelers' ninth season

== DVD release ==
Season 9 Parts 1 and 2 was released on 3 November 2009.

The Complete Ninth Season: Part 1
Set Details	Special Features
TBA Episodes (TBA Mins.); Episodes 307-330; 6-Disc Set; Full Frame; English (Dolby Digital 2.0 Stereo)	Slipcase Packaging; Photo Gallery (12 Pics)
Release Dates	Slipcase Packaging; Photo Gallery (12 Pics)
Australia	Slipcase Packaging; Photo Gallery (12 Pics)
3 November 2009	Slipcase Packaging; Photo Gallery (12 Pics)

The Complete Ninth Season: Part 2
Set Details	Special Features
TBA Episodes (TBA Mins.); Episodes 331-348; 5-Disc Set; Full Frame; English (Dolby Digital 2.0 Stereo)	Slipcase Packaging; Photo Gallery (12 Pics)
Release Dates	Slipcase Packaging; Photo Gallery (12 Pics)
Australia	Slipcase Packaging; Photo Gallery (12 Pics)
3 November 2009	Slipcase Packaging; Photo Gallery (12 Pics)

The Complete Ninth Season
Set Details	Special Features
TBA Episodes (TBA Mins.); Episodes 307-348; 11-Disc Set; Full Frame; English (Dolby Digital 2.0 Stereo)	Slipcase Packaging; Photo Gallery
Release Dates	Slipcase Packaging; Photo Gallery
Australia	Slipcase Packaging; Photo Gallery
3 November 2009	Slipcase Packaging; Photo Gallery
