= Blue Heelers season 10 =

Blue Heelers
- Season 10
- No. of episodes: 42

Release
- Original network: Seven Network
- Original release: 12 February – 26 November 2003

Season chronology
- ← Previous; Season 9 Next → Season 11

The tenth season of the Australian police-drama Blue Heelers premiered on the Seven Network on 12 February 2003 and aired on Wednesday nights at 8:30 PM. The 42-episode season concluded 26 November 2003. The main cast was the same as the previous season. Simone McAullay was introduced in episode 409 as Susie Raynor. The tenth season was released on DVD as a two part combination set on 4 May 2010.

== Casting ==
=== Main ===
- John Wood as Senior Sergeant Tom Croydon
- Julie Nihill as Christine 'Chris' Riley
- Martin Sacks as Senior Detective Patrick Joseph 'P.J.' Hasham
- Paul Bishop as Senior Constable → Acting Sergeant Benjamin 'Ben' Stewart
- Jane Allsop as Constable Jo Parrish
- Caroline Craig as Sergeant Tess Gallagher
- Ditch Davey as Constable Evan 'Jonesy' Jones
- Simone McAullay as Constable Susie Raynor

=== Guest stars ===
- Betty Bobbitt
- Robert Grubb
- Jeremy Lindsay Taylor
- Richard Cawthorne
- Lisa Crittenden
- Maggie Millar
- Betty Lucas
- Paul Mercurio
- Lynda Gibson
- Ian Rawlings
- Colette Mann
- Ernie Bourne
- Lyndel Rowe
- Andrew Clarke

== Reception ==
The season saw the series' ratings at an all time low, with 1.7 million–1.9 million viewers.

== Episodes ==
No. overall	No. in season	Title	Directed by	Written by	Australian air date
377	1	"Firebrands Part One"	Ray Quint	John Banas	12 February 2003
A drunken Ben accidentally sets fire to P.J's home. P.J is reminded of Maggie, questioning his commitment to Jo.
378	2	"Firebrands Part Two"	Ray Quint	Michael Voigt	19 February 2003
Jo tries to help Ben realise he has a drinking problem. Ben pushes the boundaries to try to catch the arsonist. P.J is haunted by Maggie's memories, yet again, leaving Jo to wonder if their relationship is even worth the effort.
379	3	"In The Dog House"	Steve Mann	Rachel Lewis	26 February 2003
Tom gets stuck between a rock and a hard place when it looks like his stepson's dog may be responsible for killing livestock on a farm belonging to an old friend.
380	4	"Excuses, Excuses"	Peter Sharp	Bill Garner	5 March 2003
Inspector Falcon-Price orders a crackdown on road offences - until Ben catches out the Inspector's own wife.
381	5	"Too Hard Basket"	Roger Hodgman	Ysabelle Dean	12 March 2003
Jo once again becomes involved with Sam Baxter after she is caught fleeing the scene of a robbery.
382	6	"Fair Play"	Chris Langman	Rob George	19 March 2003
Jo and Grace coach netball teams that are due to face each other in competition.
383	7	"The Sum of the Parts"	Richard Frankland	Dave Worthington and Tony Morphett	26 March 2003
Human remains are found in a shallow grave. Sparking a cold case investigation
384	8	"Bumps in the Night"	Peter Sharp	David Allen	2 April 2003
Something strange is happening at the new private rehab center. A wealthy resident is adamant she is being targeted by 'demons', and PJ believes the centers security consultant, Archie Garrett is involved in something suspicious.
385	9	"Trust Accounts"	Declan Eames	Tony Morphett	2 April 2003
When Jonesy accidentally puts Tess in hospital after an allergic reaction to seafood he gave her, he finds claims of missing drugs from the hospital.
386	10	"Out of Control"	Chris Langman	Michaeley O'Brien	9 April 2003
Ben's drinking problem becomes more apparent when he comes across two young kids with serious substance abuse habits.
387	11	"Love In"	Steve Mann	John Banas	23 April 2003
Tom, Jonesy and Jo join officers from St. Davids on a team building adventure weekend which goes wrong when sabotage nearly kills a man and Inspector Falcon-Price believes he was the target and that Jo was responsible. Meanwhile Ben attends his first AA meeting which leads him into having an affair with the Inspector's wife.
388	12	"Blackout"	Ray Quint	Chris Corbett	30 April 2003
An old friend of PJ's is in town providing security for an art exhibit. When a power outage causes a spate of seemingly unrelated incidents, PJ suspects there is a link.
389	13	"Where There's a Will"	Chris Langman	Sue Hore	7 May 2003
Jonesy and Tess become involved in a suicide investigation of an elderly father with suspected brain cancer.
390	14	"Father's Day Part One"	Declan Eames	Bill Garner	14 May 2003
Tess and Ben encounter a family custody dispute.
391	15	"Father's Day Part Two"	Arner Neeme	Ted Roberts	21 May 2003
Following the Inspector's discovery the Heelers try to put out the fire.
392	16	"Dream On"	Chris Langman	David Boutland	28 May 2003
As her pregnancy progresses, Tess starts dreaming vividly.
393	17	"The Ties That Bind"	Kath Hayden	David Allen	4 June 2003
Young Sam Baxter is implicated when there is a burglary—at the telephone shop run by Sam's estranged mother Adele.
394	18	"Prince Charming"	Declan Eames	Dave Worthington	11 June 2003
Jo announces she's moving out of the house she shares with PJ and Ben because she is moving in with her new boyfriend!
395	19	"The New Perfect"	Mark Piper	Tony Morphett	25 June 2003
Jo Parrish is rarely at a loss for words, but the Mt Thomas constable is momentarily speechless when she meets her fathers new girlfriend for the first time.
396	20	"Playing with Fire"	Aarne Neeme	Michaeley O'Brien	2 July 2003
Jonesy pushes Tess to watch a birthing video and name her unborn child.
397	21	"A Bad Smell"	Chris Langman	John Banas	9 July 2003
Pam, a new female plumber in town, stirs up trouble with Mount Thomas' resident plumber, Charlie Clarke.
398	22	"A Knife for a Knife"	Richard Frankland	Chris Corbett	16 July 2003
Tom's teenage step-son, Daniel, finds a class mate stabbed in an alley.
399	23	"A Better Mind"	Jenny Lewis	Declan Eames	23 July 2003
Ben investigates the health of a baby boy reared by his widowed dad.
400	24	"Thicker Than Water"	Ray Quint	John Banas	23 July 2003
Jo and PJ discover the body of a young woman at the bottom of a cliff in a suspected suicide.
401	25	"Raging Hormones"	Chris Langman	Ysabelle Dean	30 July 2003
Tess struggles to keep her emotions under control as her raging hormones give her a "pregnancy brain".
402	26	"A Blind Eye"	Kath Hayden	Peter Dick	6 August 2003
A French documentary maker in town to film country policing captures all the intricacies and conflicts.
403	27	"Chocolate Sardines"	Steve Mann	David Allen	13 August 2003
Ben has joined the Salvation Army, much to the amusement of his colleagues.
404	28	"Too Good to Be True Part One"	Grant brown	Caroline Stanton and Peter Hepworth	20 August 2003
Tess is delighted when her sister Bridie turns up in town.
405	29	"Too Good to Be True Part Two"	Peter Sharp	Tony Morphett	27 August 2003
Bridie accuses Jonesy of murder, but makes the mistake of manufacturing evidence against him.
406	30	"Every Man and His Ute"	Chris Langman	Dave Worthington	3 September 2003
Jo's life is saved by a mysterious stranger after she is left choking on her seatbelt after she is run off the road.
407	31	"Motherhood"	Richard Frankland	John Banas	10 September 2003
Tess is surprised to discover that her in-laws, are the couple who stopped to help a hit and run victim. Final Appearance of Sergeant Tess Gallagher
408	32	"A New Life"	Chris Adshead	Chris Corbett	17 September 2003
Jo takes a single mother, Cherry, under her wing when she arrives in Mt Thomas searching for Ryan, the father of her baby.
409	33	"The Lowest of the Low"	Peter Sharp	Bill Garner	24 September 2003
Constable Susie Raynor arrives in Mount Thomas. First Appearance of Constable Susie Raynor
410	34	"Safety Last"	Chris Langman	Michaeley O'Brien	1 October 2003
Jonesy begins to doubt Susie's efficiency on the job until he is taken hostage by a fugitive in the woods.
411	35	"Good and Evil Part One"	Steve Mann	Leon Saunders	8 October 2003
Ben finds his tolerance tested when his 17-year-old daughter Maddy turns up at a seedy Mt Thomas club.
412	36	"Good and Evil Part Two"	George Ogilvy	David Boutland	15 October 2003
Ben is concerned that Maddy is dating a 'weirdo' just to spite him.
413	37	"Losing the Road"	Peter Sharp	Tony Morphett	22 October 2003
Susie fears for her husband Brad's safety.
414	38	"What Goes Around"	Chris Langman	Ted Roberts	29 October 2003
Susie has found her husband, Brad, a job at a local call centre.
415	39	"Contamination"	Richard Frankland	Tony Morphett	5 November 2003
Ben buys his basketball team pork rolls from a local takeaway shop. The resulting food poisoning cause blame to get passed around.
416	40	"Dirty Cheaters"	Roger Hodgman	Dave Worthington	12 November 2003
When the Mt Thomas High School principal is attacked.
417	41	"Sexual Healing I"	Fiona Banks	Chris Corbett	26 November 2003
When a local man hangs himself.
418	42	"Sexual Healing II"	Fiona Banks	Chris Corbett	26 November 2003
Ben shoots Susie’s husband.

== DVD release ==
Season 10 Parts 1 and 2 was released on 4 May 2010.

The Complete Tenth Season (Parts 1+2)
Set Details	Special Features
Episodes 349-388 (Approx. 1800 Mins.); Episodes 349-388; 10-Disc Set; 16:9 Widescreen Aspect Ratio; English (Dolby Digital 2.0 Stereo)	Slipcase Packaging
Release Dates	Slipcase Packaging
Australia	Slipcase Packaging
4 May 2010	Slipcase Packaging
