= Kabayan, Becomes a Billionaire =

- Theatrical release poster
- Directed by: Guntur Soeharjanto
- Written by: Cassandra Massardi
- Produced by: Chand Parvez Servia
- Starring: Jamie Aditya; Rianti Cartwright; Aming; Didi Petet; Meriam Bellina; Slamet Rahardjo; Christian Sugiono; Melly Goeslaw
- Cinematography: Yunus Pasolang
- Edited by: Cesa David Luckmansyah
- Music by: Melly Goeslaw; Anto Hoed
- Production company: Starvision Plus
- Distributed by: Starvision Plus
- Release date: December 23, 2010
- Running time: 103 minutes
- Country: Indonesia
- Language: Indonesian

Kabayan, Becomes a Billionaire (Indonesian: Kabayan Jadi Milyuner) is a 2010 Indonesian comedy-drama film directed by Guntur Soeharjanto, written by Cassandra Massardi, and stars Jamie Aditya, Rianti Cartwright, Didi Petet, Meriam Bellina, and Aming.

== Plot ==
The tranquil village in West Java, home of the modest boarding school led by the Islamic cleric Ustadz Sholeh (Slamet Rahardjo), is suddenly disturbed by the presence of real estate entrepreneur Boss Rocky (Christian Sugiono) who intends to buy the land and develop a resort. But Boss Rocky encounters an unexpected opponent. His name is Kabayan (Jamie Aditya), the right-hand man of Ustadz Sholeh, and Kabayan is a man immune to bribes and more powerful persuasions. With his loyal friend Armasan (Aming), Kabayan steadfastly rejects Boss Rocky's plans. But seeing Kabayan's infatuation for Iteung (Rianti Cartwright), his lovely accountant, Boss Rocky orders Iteung to spy on Kabayan and trick him into signing the land purchase agreement, even drafting the help of Iteung's parents through false promises of preserving the village as well as building a mosque in their name.

Kabayan unknowingly signs the contract, mistaking it for a marriage certificate. While Kabayan waits for his bride, Iteung, in vain, Ustadz Sholeh is told that the property now belongs to Boss Rocky. Determined to reclaim his home and capture Iteung's heart, Kabayan goes to Jakarta and finds that Iteung's parents have promised her to Boss Rocky, believing his plans to build a mosque in their name. They give Kabayan only one chance to win Iteung, to obtain an amount of 1 billion Rupiah in a week.

== Cast ==
- Jamie Aditya as Kabayan
- Rianti Cartwright as Iteung
- Aming as Armasan
- Didi Petet as Abah
- Meriam Bellina as Ambu
- Slamet Rahardjo as Ustadz Sholeh
- Christian Sugiono as Boss Rocky
- Melly Goeslaw as Secretarist
