= Jamie Aditya =

Indonesian-Australian artist (born 1970)

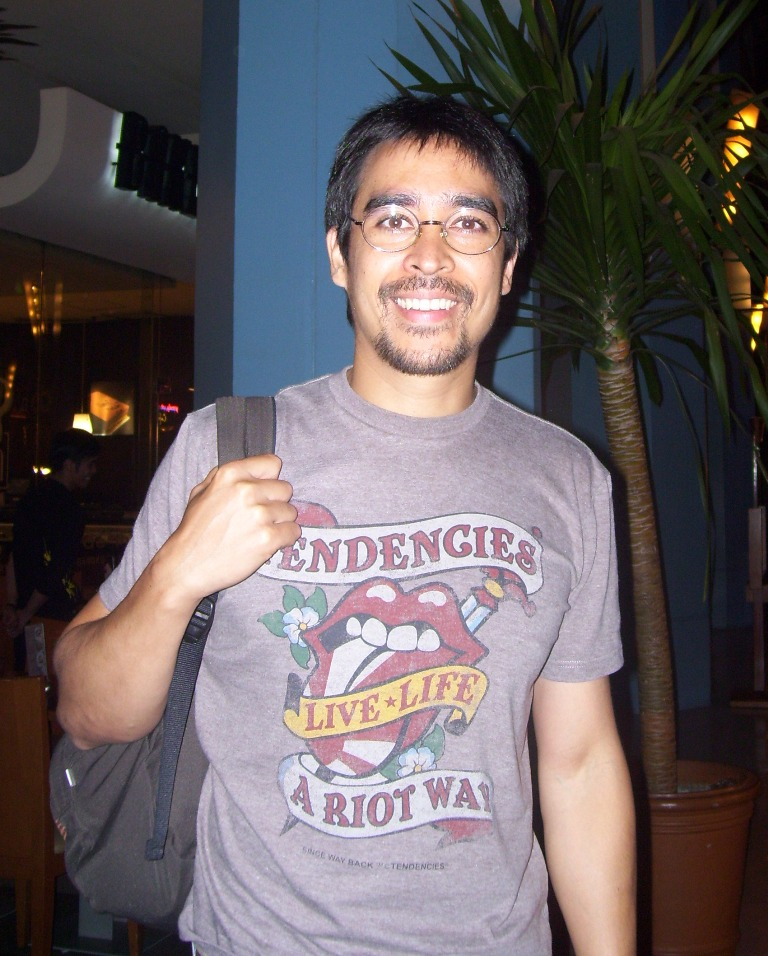
- Aditya in 2007
- Born: James Adityavarman Graham; March 12, 1970 (age 56); Canberra, Australia
- Occupations: video jockey; actor; presenter; radio host
- Years active: 1995–present
- Spouse: Nathalie Widyanti
- Parent(s): Stuart Graham and Ati Asyawati

James Adityavarman Graham (born 12 March 1970 in Canberra), known professionally as Jamie Aditya, is an Indonesian-Australian video jockey, presenter, actor, radio host, and singer.

== Family ==
Jamie Aditya is the son of Stuart Laurence Graham and Ati Asyawati, daughter of the Sundanese writer and novelist from Indonesia, Achdiat Karta Mihardja. His father is from Australia and the son of Australian Military senior officer, Stuart Clarence Graham. Jamie was their third child.

== Career ==
He was a VJ for MTV Asia and MTV Indonesia in the 1990s. In 2000, he was chosen as the best host of Asian TV Awards and was nominated as the best host in 2003. From 2004 until 2005, he became the host of Sync or Swim, produced by Discovery Channel. In 2005, he came back to Jakarta with his wife and son and became a singer. In 2007, he was the judge of Indonesian Idol for the fourth season. He also helped indie band from Bandung, such as Rock N Roll Mafia. He collaborated with Glenn Fredly in the song, "Good Times" on the album Aku Dan Wanita. He worked as a host in Singapore's HOTFM 91.3 radio station in September 2012, from 4 pm to 7.30 pm on weekdays, co-hosting with Charmaine Yee. He left the station that same year after a short stint. He voiced Spook and the mice in the kids TV series Kitty Is Not a Cat.

== Filmography ==
- XL, Antara Aku, Kau dan Mak Erot (2008)
- Asmara Dua Diana (2009)
- Kabayan Jadi Milyuner (2010)
- 2017–2020: Kitty Is Not a Cat as Spook / Mouse 1 / Mouse 2
- Griss (2018)
- Stateless (2020; ABC drama)
