= List of Kitty Is Not a Cat episodes =

Kitty Is Not a Cat is an Australian animated television series which first aired on 7TWO in Australia on 20 April 2018.

== Series overview ==
Series	Episodes		Originally released		
Series	Episodes		First released	Last released	Network
Pilot			28 April 2016		YouTube
1	52	12	12 December 2017	19 December 2017	7TWO
1	52	40	30 April 2018	25 May 2018	7TWO
2	52	30	11 November 2019	29 November 2019	7TWO
2	52	22	15 March 2026	20 March 2026	7plus
3	26		TBA	TBA	TBA

== Episodes ==
=== Pilot (2016) ===
A pilot/test animation for Kitty Is Not a Cat was released prior to the series' premiere onto BES Animation's YouTube channel in 2016.

No.	Title	Story by	Written by	Storyboard by	Original air date
0	"KITTY IS NOT A CAT!"	Unknown	Unknown	TBA	28 April 2016

=== Season 1 (2017–18) ===
No.	Title	Story by	Written by	Storyboard by	Original air date
1	"Surprise for Tubby"	Sean Zwan	Bradley Slabe	Jayden Dowler	20 April 2018 (Note: This episode first aired as a sneak peek on December 12, 2017.)
Kitty's plan to throw a surprise party for King Tubby gets misconstrued by him as an attempt to seize his throne.
2	"Teddy's Bear"	Maurice Argiro	David Breen	Maurice Argiro	20 April 2018
The cats decide Kitty needs a teddy bear, but mistakenly end up getting her a grizzly bear.
3	"Dancey Pants"	Bruce Kane	Jacklyn Bassanelli	Nick Simpson	23 April 2018 (Note: This episode first aired as a sneak peek on December 13, 2017.)
When Kitty takes her love of the reality TV show 'Dancey Pants' all the way to the TV studio, the cats must rally to get her home. This proves harder than they thought.
4	"Spook Saves Kitty"	Bruce Kane	David Breen and Bruce Kane	Sasha Mutch	23 April 2018
When Spook is left to look after Kitty, his fear of danger is taken to the extreme and he alters everything to be more 'safe'. That is until Spook gets bumped on the head and his attitude changes.
5	"All About the Bass"	Maurice Argiro	David Breen	Mark Petlock and Maurice Argiro	24 April 2018 (Note: This episode first aired as a sneak peek on December 14, 2017.)
When Kitty can't seem to progress past one, very loud, flat note on the bass, the cats rally to try to expand her repertoire. Unfortunately, nothing seems to work, leaving Kitty disheartened.
6	"Gaming & Shaming"	Maurice Argiro	Jessica Hopcraft	Michael Harris	24 April 2018
King Tubby is convinced that Kitty needs to get her hands on the latest handheld console 'Frog with a Moustache'. Kitty becomes addicted to the game.
7	"The Truth About Cats and Birds"	Bruce Kane	Maik Hempel	Michael Harris	25 April 2018 (Note: This episode first aired as a sneak peek on December 15, 2017.)
Despite the cats telling Kitty the birds are their friends; she scares them off trying to prove her cat abilities. But now she has to get them home as they've been caught and are stuck in cages at the neighbour's house.
8	"Scared of the Dark"	Bruce Kane	Bradley Slabe	Ian Milne	25 April 2018
When Kitty's nightlight goes missing, Kitty's fear of the dark comes creeping out. In the end it won't be a nightlight that saves the day.
9	"Kitty Needs a Bath"	Roberto Fino	Maik Hempel	Jayden Dowler	26 April 2018 (Note: This episode first aired as a sneak peek on December 18, 2017.)
The cats realise Kitty has furballs from attempting to lick clean her cat onesie and decide they need to give her a bath. Easier said than done in a house full of cats who hate water and a girl who thinks she's one.
10	"Scaredy Cats"	Roberto Fino	David Breen	Michael J. Harris	26 April 2018
In a blackout, Timmy Tom tells a scary story about a monster called the tail snatcher. When a terrifying shadow appears at their window they're all convinced that the story might not be made up!
11	"Cats and Cash"	Roberto Fino	Jacklyn Bassanelli	Christopher Hocking	27 April 2018 (Note: This episode first aired as a sneak peek on December 19, 2017.)
The Nazz and Kitty discover the cats have not only found the cash stash, but have been using it in ridiculous ways. They must work out how to get the money back.
12	"Queen of the Jungle"	Martin Cormier	Jacklyn Bassanelli	Christopher Hocking	27 April 2018
After watching a documentary on lions, Kitty begins terrorising the cats and any other creature in sight. They decide the only way to snap her out of this is to show her the reality of living like a lion.
13	"Calling All Cats"	Roberto Fino	Michael Dockery	Sasha Mutch	30 April 2018
Two desperate gangsters on the run from police show up at the mansion. The whole house is in danger when these thugs take over and try to steal the cats' house out from under them.
14	"Family Trees"	Roberto Fino	Bradley Slabe	Michael Dockery	30 April 2018
The cats try to help Kitty learn about her family background by taking a trip to the zoo.
15	"The Playhouse"	Roberto Fino	David Breen	Ben Leon	1 May 2018
The cats are devastated when they mistake Kitty playing in a playhouse, for her moving out. But once Kitty realises the mistake her friends have made, she knows exactly how to fix it.
16	"Kitty Gets Jealous"	Roberto Fino	Bradley Slabe	Michael Harris	1 May 2018
When an adorable injured bunny arrives on the doorstep the cats are completely smitten. Kitty however, is faced with feelings of jealousy.
17	"Hired Hound"	Sean Zwan	Jacklyn Bassanelli	Mark Petlock	2 May 2018
The cats are on edge when a guard dog named Butcher is hired by Harold to keep them quiet. Now reduced to creating as little noise as possible, they need a solution fast.
18	"Happy Days"	Martin Cormier	Bradley Slabe	Sasha Mutch	2 May 2018
When Happy gets gifted some spectacles after a few too many accidents in the house, his new vision allows him to see life like everyone else. Unfortunately, this does not make Happy, happy.
19	"Seven Cakes for Kitty"	Roberto Fino	Maik Hempel	Michael Dockery	3 May 2018
The cats decide to bake Kitty seven cakes to make up for not having celebrated her birthday.
20	"Kitty Gets Dumped"	Roberto Fino	Jacklyn Bassanelli	Sean Anderson	3 May 2018
Kitty and Timmy Tom make the best out of a bad situation when they get stranded at the rubbish dump.
21	"Tuned In and Out"	Roberto Fino	Michael Dockery	Mark Petlock	4 May 2018
When Kitty and Timmy Tom trick Olive into thinking Stanley is a piano prodigy, they must then work with Stanley to try and get his lack of real talent up to scratch.
22	"A Work of Fact or Fiction"	Martin Cormier	Michael Dockery	Michael J. Harris	4 May 2018
When the cats come to believe there is treasure buried on their property, chaos engulfs the house and destroys the backyard.
23	"Cats' Liberation"	Maik Hempel	Maik Hempel	Ben Leon	7 May 2018
When Miley decides to rally the cats to create a serious movie to get humans to take them seriously, she discovers she's bitten off more than she can chew.
24	"Ming the Magnifico"	Martin Cormier	Jessica Hopcraft	Sasha Mutch	7 May 2018
After a botched attempt at hypnosis from Ming, the younger cats get a hold of his mystical crystal, and unfortunately, they have a little better luck than he did.
25	"The Big House"	Sean Zwan	David Breen, Bruce Kane & Jessica Hopcraft	Mark Sonntag	8 May 2018
When Kitty loses Happy on an outing and he is picked up by a stranger, the cats and Kitty are terrified. Happy's in "the Big House" - a decadent mansion, but the others think he's in cat prison!
26	"Sour Kitty"	Roberto Fino	Jacklyn Bassanelli, Bruce Kane & David Witt	Greg Holfeld	8 May 2018
When Kitty gorges on Halloween candy, her emotions get a little shaky. The cats don't know how to handle this new Kitty, but she's run out of treats so they better work it out fast!
27	"Safety Cat"	Martin Cormier	Michael Dockery	Michael J. Harris	9 May 2018
Last Chance is enlisted to educate Kitty on the dangers of being a cat and he does a bang-up job. That is, until he gets himself in a situation where his feline faculties aren't enough.
28	"Kitty Copy Cat"	Sean Zwan	Jessica Hopcraft	Lluis Sanchez	9 May 2018
When Kitty starts copying Miley's look, music, hobbies... everything, Miley struggles to keep her cool and plans to trick Kitty back into being herself.
29	"Old Mother Tubbard"	Michael J. Harris	David Breen & Bruce Kane	Sasha Mutch	10 May 2018
An unexpected visit from King Tubby's mother has the household in a funk, as they are forced to assume fake roles based on the lies King Tubby has told her.
30	"Sandwich Playdate"	Sean Zwan	Maik Hempel	Mark Petlock	10 May 2018
When the cats invite the child from next door over for a play date, they get a very bad impression of how human children are supposed to act.
31	"The Future Is Feline"	Andrew Bowler	Jessica Hopcraft	Michael J. Harris	11 May 2018
When Kitty makes an origami fortune teller she isn't prepared for the trouble it will cause her, but getting rid of it might be harder than she thought.
32	"School for Cats"	Roberto Fino	Bradley Slabe & Bruce Kane	Mark Petlock	11 May 2018
To prepare Kitty for school, King Tubby decides to set up some practice classes and insists the other cats teach them. Kitty is clearly adept at every subject, but unfortunately her teachers don't do quite as well.
33	"Paw and Order"	Roberto Fino	Bradley Slabe, Bruce Kane & Jessica Hopcraft	Mark Sonntag	14 May 2018
When a sleep-walking King Tubby eats a cake he was saving in the fridge, he wakes in horror to find it gone. All signs point to Kitty being the cake thief - but an in-house investigation could uncover the truth about what really happened.
34	"The Furball Champion"	Roberto Fino	Tyson Gaunt	Greg Holfeld	14 May 2018
The cats band together to attempt to play sports with Kitty, but the complicated rules and confusing equipment see the cats losing interest fast.
35	"Rat a Cat Cat"	Sean Zwan	Bruce Kane and Tony Wilson	Sasha Mutch	15 May 2018
When a tap dancing rat wiggles his way into Kitty's life, she is naive to his true colours. Lucky for Kitty it's the cats' job to be able to smell a rat... and they do!
36	"Robo-Dog"	Martin Cormier	Naomi Holmes	Michael Dockery	15 May 2018
Kitty and Timmy try to integrate a Robo-dog into the house with very little success. The cats decide a Robo-cat would be much better, but they soon find out their own species is worse!
37	"Fickle World of Feline Art"	Sasha Mutch	Lucy Shaw & Ricardo Ramirez	Michael J. Harris	16 May 2018
When King Tubby demands the household participate in an art competition to paint a portrait of him, the results aren't quite what he wanted.
38	"The Time Capsule"	Michael J. Harris	Jessica Hopcraft	Michael J. Harris	16 May 2018
King Tubby comes up with the idea of creating a time capsule to fill with significant objects to bury in the backyard.
39	"The Arrival"	Maurice Argiro	Bruce Kane	Nick Simpson & Sasha Mutch	17 May 2018
On New Year's Eve, the cats look back at the arrival of their favourite little household member, Kitty.
40	"Deportment"	Roberto Fino	Jo Watson	Anne Yi	17 May 2018
King Tubby's mother arrives for a visit and decides it's time that Kitty is introduced to all things deportment.
41	"Possum in the Roof"	Martin Cormier	Jessica Hopcraft	Dave Follett	18 May 2018
Kitty's obsession with a wildlife TV show is brought in to play when she lets a possum seek shelter in the house.
42	"Herding Humans"	Roberto Fino	David Witt & Bruce Kane	Anne Yi	18 May 2018
When King Tubby decides that the cats need to teach Kitty about queuing, he makes them all begin lining up... for everything!
43	"Petal Pushers"	Michael J. Harris	Jessica Hopcraft	Michael J. Harris	21 May 2018
When Petal overhears the cats complaining about her 'niceness' she decides if they don't want nice Petal... they won't get nice Petal!
44	"Tubnesia"	Sean Zwan & Nick Campbell	Sean Zwan	Sean Zwan	21 May 2018
After a rather large bump on the head King Tubby cannot remember who Kitty is. So the cats try their hardest to remind him of all the wonderful memories they share together.
45	"Yodel-Ay-He-Who"	Maik Hempel	Maik Hempel	Dave Follett	22 May 2018
When Kitty and Spook play an old yodelling record they are shocked to see the whole household come down with an infectious case of the yodels!
46	"Square Debt"	Maurice Argiro & Roberto Fino	David Witt & Bruce Kane	John Eyley	22 May 2018
When Kitty is blamed for the breakage of an expensive vase belonging to the neighbours, she is set to work to pay her debt.
47	"The Bump in the Basement"	Roberto Fino	Michael Dockery	Michael Dockery & Patrick Crawley	23 May 2018
Kitty discovers a baby bird who immediately latches on to her, thinking she is its mother.
48	"Sharing"	Roberto Fino	David Witt & Jessica Hopcraft	Anne Yi	23 May 2018
Kitty displays some very human like behaviour when she becomes possessive of a toy and doesn't want to share it.
49	"Funky Cat"	Maurice Argiro	Tony Wilson	Maurice Argiro	24 May 2018
An intergalactic funky feline from The Nazz's musical past shows up on the doorstep of the house and asks him to come back on tour with him.
50	"Kitty Gets Court"	Michael J. Harris	Bruce Kane	Michael J. Harris	24 May 2018
A series of characters take the stand against Kitty in an episode that is so strange, it might just all be a dream.
51	"When the Cats Are Away"	Roberto Fino	Lorin Clarke, Bruce Kane & Jessica Hopcraft	Dave Follett	25 May 2018
When Timmy Tom and Kitty are left home alone with the mice, they're shocked when they decide to invite over a few of their friends.
52	"Cat Naps"	Martin Cormier & Sean Zwan	Michael Dockery & Martin Cormier	Sean Zwan & Ben Leon	25 May 2018
Convinced Kitty is turning into a creature called a 'Grumpkin' due to lack of sleep, King Tubby convinces the cats to keep her awake until night time to get her back to normal.

=== Season 2 (2019; 2026) ===
No. overall	No. in season	Title	Directed by	Written by	Storyboard by	Original air date
Part 1
53	1	"Meowing at the Moon"	Roberto Fino	Story by : Bruce Kane and Jessica Hopcraft; Written by : Tyson Gaunt	Dave Follett	11 November 2019
The mice get trapped in the house on a Wild Moon - the one night where all the cats go bonkers. Kitty protects them from the cats, who are suddenly hungry for mouse.
54	2	"Little Miss Kitty"	Maurice Argiro	Story by : Bruce Kane; Written by : Jo Watson	Maurice Argiro	11 November 2019
Kitty always falls asleep during her fairy tale bedtime stories, so the cats decide to act them out to impart their important moral messages.
55	3	"Vote 4 Kitty"	Maurice Argiro	Ricardo Ramirez	Greg Holfeld	12 November 2019
When the cats learn what an election is, they realise they never voted for King Tubby as leader. They pick Kitty as a candidate to run against him in their own election.
56	4	"Tubby's Signature Move"	Jayden Dowler	Naomi Holmes and Jessica Hopcraft	Tom McKinnell	12 November 2019
King Tubby sees a viral dance move online and decides to try and go viral himself - but coming up with a cool new dance is much harder than it looks.
57	5	"Kids' Craze"	Andrew Bowler	Tyson Gaunt	Andrew Bowler	13 November 2019
Cheeta and King Tubby set out to invent the latest "kids craze" using Kitty as a guinea pig, but despite all their crazy gadgets, she's content with a simple ball of yarn.
58	6	"Junior Rangers"	Martin Cormier	Jacklyn Bassanelli	Tom McKinnell	13 November 2019
Petal thinks becoming a Junior Ranger would be good to help Kitty learn to behave like a human. However, it's Petal who quickly becomes obsessed with it.
59	7	"Imaginary Friend(s)"	Andrew Bowler	Jessica Hopcraft	Andrew Bowler	14 November 2019
When Kitty starts playing with an imaginary friend, the cats all decide to get imaginary friends of their own - to the detriment of their friendships with each other.
60	8	"The Nightly Mews"	Roberto Fino	Lucy Shaw	Tom McKinnell and Roberto Fino	14 November 2019
Bored with the news, Cheeta decides to start his own news about Kitty's daily activities. In order to make it interesting, he has to resort to hurtful lies.
61	9	"Spiritual Guise"	Michael J. Harris	Michael Dockery	Michael J. Harris	15 November 2019
King Tubby gets scammed by Lucky Chuck and Yeahno with a fake guru service that will supposedly help him make decisions. Unfortunately, they're just here to steal all his stuff.
62	10	"Commercial Cats"	Roberto Fino	Bruce Kane	Bob Baxter	15 November 2019
When Cheeta learns about advertising, he decides to make his own ads to sell Ted's stuff. However, his limited understanding of what advertising is keeps getting in the way.
63	11	"Bad Comedy"	Michael J. Harris	Tony Wilson	Michael J. Harris	18 November 2019
In lieu of a court jester, King Tubby hires a terrible comedian to entertain him. Unfortunately, the jokester they get only does insult comedy.
64	12	"Losing the Beat"	Maurice Argiro	Lorin Clarke	Nick Simpson	18 November 2019
When Ginsburg accidentally shaves his goatee off, he thinks it's caused him to lose his sense of rhythm. Kitty tries to help him find it again.
65	13	"Yah Outta the Band"	Martin Cormier	Tyson Gaunt	Julius Tan	19 November 2019
The band gets a record deal, but on one condition - Cheeta gets replaced with a studio musician. Heartbroken, Cheeta tries to start his own band.
66	14	"Cat Cafe"	Roberto Fino	Jo Watson	Anne Yi	19 November 2019
Kitty does work experience at a cafe, and the cats come along to support her. Unfortunately, she is competing for the position with Stanley.
67	15	"Cat Burglar"	Michael J. Harris	Jo Watson	Michael J. Harris	20 November 2019
After hearing about a cat burglar on the news, the cats' belongings start to mysteriously disappear. When they begin their investigations, all of the clues seem to point to Kitty.
68	16	"Basement Buddies"	Bec Readhead	Jessica Hopcraft	Julius Tan	20 November 2019
King Tubby and Miley get stuck in the basement together. They couldn't think of a worse person to be stuck with - they're nothing alike! Or are they?
69	17	"Meditating Miley"	Michael J. Harris	Jessica Hopcraft	Bec Readhead	21 November 2019
The Nazz decides to teach Miley how to meditate after her temper tantrums go too far. She meditates every time she feels angry - which turns out to be all the time.
70	18	"My Fair Harold"	Roberto Fino	Ricardo Ramirez	Greg Holfeld	21 November 2019
When Olive kicks Harold out, he comes to live with the cats. They find him insufferable and, in order to get rid of him, decide to try and find a way to make Olive take him back.
71	19	"Luck Be a Kitty Tonight"	Roberto Fino	James Ferris	Anne Yi	22 November 2019
When the Stinkletons throw out their maneki- neko, they start getting bad luck - and when Kitty picks it up, the cats start having good luck.
72	20	"Dear Luna"	Roberto Fino	Jessica Hopcraft	Roberto Fino	22 November 2019
The cats won't take Luna's well-meaning advice, so she starts giving it to them under the pseudonym 'Dear Tuna' in her own advice radio show.
73	21	"Every Thorn Has Its Rose"	Roberto Fino	Jessica Hopcraft	Greg Holfeld and Roberto Fino	25 November 2019
Thorn's sister Rose comes to visit and unknowingly reveals to the household that Thorn's supposedly "glamorous" past isn't all that it seems.
74	22	"Survival of the Cattest"	Maurice Argiro	Tyson Gaunt	Nick Simpson	25 November 2019
Kitty loves watching a survivalist reality TV show, and when the cats learn they could win five million dollars, they decide to recreate it themselves.
75	23	"A Place in the Sun"	Roberto Fino	James Ferris	Roberto Fino and Julius Tan	26 November 2019
When the cats' sunny naptime is disturbed by the shadow of the Stinkletons' new satellite dish, Last Chance, Spook, and Kitty go to investigate.
76	24	"General Romantic Housecall"	Michael J. Harris	Lucy Shaw	Michael J. Harris	26 November 2019
Spook wins a day with the doctor from General Romantic Hospital. To the cats' increasing frustration, Spook doesn't get that he's not a real doctor.
77	25	"Last Chance's Last Chance"	Michael J. Harris	Lauren Anderson	Michael J. Harris	27 November 2019
Last Chance has lost a life on each of his birthdays, so Kitty doesn't like his chances for this one - and it doesn't help that the party games have been planned by Cheeta.
78	26	"The Catley Awards"	Bec Readhead	Bruce Kane	Bec Readhead	27 November 2019
King Tubby hosts an award ceremony for the house full of cats, complete with silly award categories, special guests, and unexpected winners!
79	27	"Kittenman"	Roberto Fino	Bruce Kane and Tony Wilson	Julius Tan	28 November 2019
Timmy Tom believes that he really is a superhero, and Kitty has to tag along as he annoys the household with his misguided attempts to help.
80	28	"Unboxing Kitty"	Roberto Fino	Naomi Holmes	Anne Yi	28 November 2019
Kitty makes popular unboxing videos that she uploads online. When Luna finds out, she decides to become Kitty's coffee-guzzling brand manager: her Lunager.
81	29	"Sibling Rivalry"	Maurice Argiro	Lauren Anderson	Nick Simpson	29 November 2019
By comparing Kitty and Timmy Tom, the cats accidentally cause the pair to become deeply competitive for their attention.
82	30	"Dog Whistling"	Roberto Fino	Michael Drake	Tom McKinnell	29 November 2019
Everyone in the household knows how to whistle, except for Kitty. When a dog shows up at the cat house, they discover she can in fact whistle - but it's only audible to dogs.
Part 2
83	31	"Cat Cold"	Jayden Dowler	Annabelle Ots	Julius Tan	15 March 2026 (7plus); 4 September 2026 (7two)
In trying to keep Kitty from catching the cat cold, the household of cats all catch it themselves! Now it's up to Kitty to take care of them.
84	32	"Cats Eye-Q"	Roberto Fino	Ray Boseley	Bob Baxter	15 March 2026 (7plus); 4 September 2026 (7two)
The cats decide to test their IQ. Much to their surprise, Kitty gets the lowest score. Even more to their surprise, King Tubby gets the highest.
85	33	"Germs"	Roberto Fino	Martin Cormier	Greg Holfeld	15 March 2026 (7plus); 5 September 2026 (7two)
When Kitty plays with her new microscope, she starts to worry about germs. The cats try to reassure her, but how can Kitty relax when germs are absolutely everywhere?
86	34	"I Spai"	Maik Hempel	Isaac Miller, Jessica Hopcraft and Maik Hempel	Maik Hempel	15 March 2026 (7plus); 5 September 2026 (7two)
King Tubby gets a virtual assistant for the household - SPAI - as a new learning tool for Kitty. However, it soon turns the house upside down.
87	35	"The Mosquito"	Michael J. Harris	Michael J. Harris	Michael J. Harris	15 March 2026 (7plus); 5 September 2026 (7two)
Kitty's peaceful night's sleep is disturbed by the intrusion of an annoying, buzzing mosquito. It's up to her to catch the fiend without waking up any of the sleeping cats.
88	36	"Hitting the Heights"	Roberto Fino	Michael Drake	Tom McKinnell	15 March 2026 (7plus); 5 September 2026 (7two)
When a well-meaning lesson goes too far, Kitty develops a serious fear of being up high, and the cats have to find a way to build up her confidence again.
89	37	"Snow Day"	Martin Cormier	Tyson Gaunt	Julius Tan	15 March 2026 (7plus); 5 September 2026 (7two)
Kitty is excited waiting for the snow, but the cats don't know what that is. In a panic, Spook starts planning for the inevitable end of the world.
90	38	"The Kitty Factor"	Roberto Fino	Jessica Hopcraft	Sarah Brennan	15 March 2026 (7plus); 5 September 2026 (7two)
Pierre helps Kitty discover that she's a trendsetter when other cats in the household start copying her. Kitty can't help it - she just has the "it factor"!
91	39	"Abra Catabra"	Bec Readhead	Scott Edgar	Bec Readhead	15 March 2026 (7plus); 6 September 2026 (7two)
When Kitty's magic act makes the Nazz disappear, the cats frantically try to find him again. Meanwhile, the Nazz finally has some peace and quiet.
92	40	"You Can't Handle the Juice!"	Roberto Fino	Lauren Anderson	Mark Sheard	15 March 2026 (7plus); 6 September 2026 (7two)
Olive tricks Petal into buying box upon box of the disgusting Juicy Juice - and the only way to get rid of it is to sell it to her friends!
93	41	"Space Cats"	Martin Cormier	Martin Cormier	Julius Tan	15 March 2026 (7plus); 6 September 2026 (7two)
In order to command some respect from his subjects, King Tubby declares that they will put the first cat on the moon. The problem is that Happy is their short-sighted astronaut.
94	42	"Catmer vs Catmer"	Michael J. Harris	Lucy Shaw	Sarah Brennan	15 March 2026 (7plus); 6 September 2026 (7two)
The cats get sick of Mr Clean and Thorn's constant bickering, so they leave them behind when they go shopping. But now Kitty has to deal with them!
95	43	"Tap & Go"	Roberto Fino	Bruce Kane	Anne Yi	20 March 2026 (7plus); 6 September 2026 (7two)
Ming has put King Tubby on an allowance to stop him from spending all of the household's money, but things go awry when King Tubby gets a credit card.
96	44	"Shouty Time"	Maik Hempel	Maik Hempel	Maik Hempel	20 March 2026 (7plus); 6 September 2026 (7two)
When Kitty finds a Flobberknob doll, the cats find themselves easily irritated by its gross noises. The problem is that Kitty seems to enjoy annoying them.
97	45	"Up The Ante"	Bruce Kane and Damien Smart	Bruce Kane	Julius Tan	20 March 2026 (7plus); 7 September 2026 (7two)
The household of cats are really struggling to put their heads together and work as a team, so Kitty tries to help them out by showing them some of the best team players on the planet - ants!
98	46	"Kitty Retires"	Martin Cormier	James Ferris	Mark Sheard	20 March 2026 (7plus); 7 September 2026 (7two)
When King Tubby and Petal discover the concept of retirement, they're afraid that Kitty has left it too late - you can never retire too early, after all!
99	47	"Double Trouble"	Michael J. Harris	Ray Boseley	Michael J. Harris	20 March 2026 (7plus); 8 September 2026 (7two)
Kitty loves Trouble, her new pet fish, but the cats are horrified to discover that it's not a fish at all. Now all that's left is to try and prove it to Kitty.
100	48	"Pen Pals"	Andrew Bowler	Jessica Hopcraft	Brigette Liberto	20 March 2026 (7plus); 8 September 2026 (7two)
Kitty is writing to her pen pal, Sven, but he never seems to reply! Petal, Cheeta, and Last Chance concoct a plan to send Kitty letters themselves.
101	49	"Laziness"	Roberto Fino	Story by : Bruce Kane; Written by : Jon Dalgaard	Dave Follett	20 March 2026 (7plus); 9 September 2026 (7two)
King Tubby decides it's time to try and teach Kitty to waste her energy like a human, as opposed to saving it like a cat.
102	50	"Catdown"	Bec Readhead	Bruce Kane	Bec Readhead	20 March 2026 (7plus); 9 September 2026 (7two)
Kitty is a guest on a show announcing the top ten cat songs of the year. Unfortunately, Claw is her co-host, and he doesn't like any of the songs!
103	51	"Clean vs the Birds"	Martin Cormier	Martin Cormier	Julius Tan	20 March 2026 (7plus); 10 September 2026 (7two)
Mr Clean is very proud of his achievement to grow the exotic Gooberry Bush in his own backyard! Unfortunately, one bird has taken a particular interest in the berries.
104	52	"Best Best Friend"	Maik Hempel	Jessica Hopcraft	Maik Hempel	20 March 2026 (7plus); 10 September 2026 (7two)
When Luna discovers that humans only have one best friend, she decides it's important to find out which of the cats is Kitty's.

=== Season 3 ===
This season has never aired in Australia. It was originally planned to run for 52 episodes, as with the first two seasons, however it was cut down to 26 episodes.

No. overall	No. in season	Title	Directed by	Written by	Storyboard by	Original air date
105	1	"The Big Tomato"	Maik Hempel	Jo Watson	Maik Hempel	TBA
106	2	"Trivial Paw-Suit"	Roberto Fino	Ricardo Ramirez	Mark Sheard	TBA
107	3	"Pawsitivity"	Roberto Fino	Jessica Hopcaft	Bec Readhead & Mark Sheard	TBA
108	4	"Garage Sale"	Maik Hempel	Bradley Slabe	Sarah Brennan	TBA
109	5	"Ciao Ciao Chow Chow"	Roberto Fino	Jessica Hopcraft	Mark Sheard	TBA
110	6	"Gifted Kitty"	Maurice Argiro	Bruce Kane	Maurice Argiro	TBA
111	7	"King Bratty"	Roberto Fino	Jessica Hopcaft	Greg Holfeld	TBA
112	8	"Earth Day"	Michael J. Harris	Jessica Hopcaft	Julius Tan	TBA
113	9	"April Fools"	Martin Cormier	Bruce Kane	Andrew Bowler & Julius Tan	TBA
114	10	"You're It!"	Roberto Fino	Ricardo Ramirez	Mark Sheard	TBA
115	11	"Sepurration Anxiety"	Roberto Fino	Jessica Hopcraft	Sarah Brennan	TBA
116	12	"Remote Control"	Michael J. Harris	Lucy Shaw	Michael J. Harris	TBA
117	13	"Classical Kitty"	Roberto Fino	Lorin Clarke and Bruce Kane	Anne Yi	TBA
118	14	"Nick Name Nelly"	Roberto Fino	Jessica Hopcraft	Julius Tan	TBA
119	15	"Frog Prince"	Maik Hempel	Bruce Kane	Maik Hempel	TBA
120	16	"Foxy Chicken"	Roberto Fino	Bruce Kane	Anne Yi	TBA
121	17	"In the Shadow of Mice"	Maik Hempel	Bec Readhead and Maik Hempel	Maik Hempel	TBA
122	18	"Collective Chaos"	Maik Hempel	Ray Bosseley & Maik Hempel	Maik Hempel	TBA
123	19	"Fact Cat"	Michael J. Harris	Bruce Kane	Michael J. Harris	TBA
124	20	"Catmus"	Michael J. Harris	Tyson Gaunt	Michael J. Harris	TBA
125	21	"Catter Up"	Maurice Argiro & Roberto Fino	Bruce Kane	Maurice Argiro & Dave Follett	TBA
126	22	"Chauf-Fur"	Andrew Bowler	Jessica Hopcaft & Bruce Kane	Sarah Brennan	TBA
127	23	"A Cat's Tail"	Andrew Bowler	Bruce Kane	Mark Sheard	TBA
128	24	"Car Trouble"	Martin Cormier	Martin Cormier	Sarah Brennan	TBA
129	25	"Pineapple Pizza"	Roberto Fino	Bruce Kane	Anne Yi	TBA
130	26	"Paper Tigers"	Andrew Bowler	Lauren Anderson	Mark Sheard	TBA
