= Kitty Is Not a Cat =

- Genre: Comedy; Musical
- Created by: Bruce Kane; Maurice Argiro
- Written by: Bruce Kane; Jessica Hopcraft
- Directed by: Maurice Argiro; Roberto Fino
- Starring: Rove McManus; Cal Wilson; Stephen Hall (seasons 1–2); Rachel King; Rupert Degas; Jamie Aditya; Vincent Milesi; Marg Downey; Roslyn Oades
- Narrated by: Marg Downey
- Theme music composer: Quan Yeomans
- Composer: Quan Yeomans
- Country of origin: Australia
- Original language: English
- No. of series: 3
- No. of episodes: 130 (26 unaired in Australia) (list of episodes)

Production
- Executive producer: Bruce Kane
- Producers: Judith Whittle; Laura DiMaio (season 1)
- Running time: 11 minutes
- Production company: BES Animation

Original release
- Network: 7TWO (2017–2019); 7plus (2026); Pop (Slovenia); UYoung (Asia)
- Release: 12 December 2017 – 29 November 2019
- Release: 15 March 2026 – present

Kitty Is Not a Cat is an Australian animated musical television series which first aired on 7TWO in Australia on 12 December 2017, with a sneak peek of the show's first 12 episodes, that lasted until 19 December. It then properly premiered on the channel on 20 April 2018, with episode premieres resuming 10 days later.

On 21 September 2018, it was announced that it was renewed for a second season, which premiered on 11 November 2019. The series was renewed for a third season in October 2019; it was originally announced as a 52-episode season, as the previous two seasons were; however it would eventually be cut down to 26 episodes, likely as a result of Australian funding budget cuts. The series was not renewed for a season 4.

The series is incomplete in Australia, as new broadcasts would temporarily cease after November 2019; several networks worldwide had aired the remaining 48 episodes since 2020, and all 130 episodes were released internationally by the year 2023. After a long hiatus, 7plus would eventually release the remaining episodes of the second season in March 2026, followed by a television broadcast in September of the same year. However, the third and final season has not yet released in the country.

== Plot ==
Kitty Is Not a Cat follows the story of a little girl called Kitty who has a big imagination who feels like she can be anything she wants, even a cat. Kitty arrives at a house full of partying felines, who suddenly find their lives turned upside down. They attempt to teach Kitty how to be a human when she actually prefers to live her life as a cat.

== Characters ==
=== Main ===
- Kitty (voiced by Roslyn Oades) – The titular heroine who is not a cat. She has black hair and wears an orange cat costume with a red collar. Her skin is white, with light maroon cheeks on her face. She is an orphan. Her origin or how she found out about the mansion with the talking, smart & musical cats remains a mystery.
- King Tubby (voiced by Rove McManus) – A fat black tuxedo Persian cat. He has black fur and wears a red collar and a tin can for a crown. Self-appointed "king of all cats", Tubby spends most of his time "sitting on his throne, pretending he knows just what's going on". He however regularly provides explanations on certain aspects of humanity, albeit shaky ones. Oddly, he doesn't seem to play any musical instrument.
- The Nazz (voiced by Stephen Hall) – A dark orange Norwegian forest Persian fox-cat. Maybe the oldest cat in the mansion, The Nazz is also the sanest, wisest, and most responsible one, who tries to keep a semblance of order. He's a talented and experienced piano player who composed and recorded several albums' worth of songs. The Nazz barely appears in season 2, only having two episodes in total where he provides a speaking role, and the rest of his appearances are non-dialogue cameos where he is not in focus; his role as a father figure to Kitty in the show is completely taken over by Ming. The Nazz is then completely absent from the show in season 3.
- Petal (voiced by Cal Wilson) – A Russian Blue cat, who's soft-spoken, calm, takes great care of others, but knows how to be firm when needed. She is considered a mother figure for Kitty, keeping her safe and teaching her the values of kindness, diligence and patience. She plays the saxophone.
- Timmy Tom (voiced by Rachel King) – A light blue tabby cat. The youngest of all the cats, Timmy is almost always seen in Kitty's company, and they always get along wonderfully. He can still play a few instruments, notably pianos.
- Miley (also voiced by Rachel King) – A light pink tabby cat. She has pink fur with a light pink belly and wears glasses. A brilliant, snarky, sour loner, Miley is usually seen reading a book or cultivating her individuality. She has a well-hidden soft spot for Kitty, which doesn't stop her from expressing her criticism in her idiosyncratic way. She can use a keyboard, but her specialty is samples, synthwave and electronic music.
- Cheeta (also voiced by Rove McManus) – A cyan Siamese cat, no one is ever sure if what is going to come out of Cheeta's mouth, be it a creative piece of advice, or some more nonsensical solutions that will likely make the problem worse. Still, he sometimes has good (if unusual) ideas, and plays the electric guitar.
- Ginsburg (voiced by Vincent Milesi) – A cyan tabby cat. Little is shown about Ginsburg, safe from the fact that he is usually not very quick, likes to end his sentences in "Man", and is an incredible drummer.
- Pierre (voiced by Rupert Degas) – A cyan tabby cat. Refined, elegant, and French, Pierre is the mansion's cook and plays the bass.
- Ming (also voiced by Rupert Degas) – A Balinese persian cat. Scary, cold and distant, Ming behaves like an inscrutable sci-fi B movie villain. He's always had very ambivalent feelings towards the mansion's new resident. He plays keyboards in a very personal manner. By season 2, he is considered a father figure to Kitty, teaching her valuable lessons about life, morals and the value of humanity.
- Mr. Clean (also voiced by Rupert Degas) – A Maine Coon-Manx cat. Small, dirty, and simple, Mr. Clean is a humble cat who is very satisfied with his own hygiene. He's been shown to know how to grow fruit and vegetables, and, he plays the tuba.
- Happy (also voiced by Rupert Degas) – A Chartreux eyes-closed cat, Happy would have a hard time seeing his own paws, but this handicap has resulted in a unique character trait: since he can't see the bad in anything, then everything is amazing to him all the time! He provides lighthearted comic relief and plays the trombone.
- Last Chance (also voiced by Rove McManus) – An injured green tabby cat. Everyone knows cats have nine lives. Last Chance is on his, well, last one, but he isn't going to let this bring him down. He plays the trumpet, and announces King Tubby's arrivals and house meetings.
- Thorn (also voiced by Cal Wilson) – A black and white Sphynx cat. She has black fur with a white muzzle and belly. She wears a red collar around her neck. She also wears a pair of white boots. Dark, menacing, classy, and cold, Thorn may seem scary, but has shown more many times how deeply she cares for little Kitty. She is an impressive singer, speaks with a Russian accent and has a twin sister named Rose (also voiced by Wilson).
- Spook (voiced by Jamie Aditya) – An Abyssinian-Munchkin cat who is afraid of spiders, Spook perfectly illustrates the expression "scaredy cat". He's terrified, startled, or worried by nearly everything, but finds comfort in a sappy romance television show, and apparently has a knack for technology. He doesn't play instruments, but knows his way as a disc jockey.
- Luna (also voiced by Rachel King) – A brown-haired tabby cat, Luna tries to avoid effort whenever possible, except when music and dancing are involved. She plays the zither.

=== Recurring ===
- The Mice (both voiced by Jamie Aditya) – a pair who work for King Tubby and wheel him out of places, which they don't do happily. They frequently complain about how they aren't given a break.
- Harold Stinkleton (voiced by Rupert Degas) – One of the neighbours. He is grumpy, clueless, and submissive towards his wife.
- Olive Stinkleton (voiced by Rachel King) – One of the neighbours. She is prissy, haughty, and bossy towards her husband.
- Stanley "Stan" Stinkleton (voiced by Marg Downey) – The youngest Stinkleton. He is usually depicted playing video games, eating, sleeping, and doing as little of worth as possible.
- King Tubby's Mom (voiced by Rove McManus) – A fat black tuxedo Persian cat. She is the mother of King Tubby.

== Production ==
Kitty Is Not a Cat is created by Bruce Kane and Maurice Argiro and produced by BES Animation for Seven Network in Australia. Kane has said that they "wanted to create a show that uniquely blends urban culture, comedy, and music with stories that connect to 6-10-year-old kids."

A pilot/test animation for the series was uploaded to BES Animation's YouTube channel, prior to the series' release on April 28, 2016. The pilot implies a slightly darker tone for the series was considered, but ultimately dropped. Factors present in the pilot such as Kitty being an orphan who is abandoned by her family are hardly touched on, and rarely alluded to, in the final series. Though most of the characters are present in the final, Blossom (a snobby red female cat) was removed, and Rose (in the pilot, a white female cat) was redesigned from scratch and reworked to be Thorn's cousin for an episode.

== Episodes ==
Series	Episodes		Originally released		
Series	Episodes		First released	Last released	Network
Pilot			28 April 2016		YouTube
1	52	12	12 December 2017	19 December 2017	7TWO
1	52	40	30 April 2018	25 May 2018	7TWO
2	52	30	11 November 2019	29 November 2019	7TWO
2	52	22	15 March 2026	20 March 2026	7plus
3	26		TBA	TBA	TBA

== Broadcast ==
Kitty Is Not a Cat premiered on 7TWO in Australia on 20 April 2018. The first season concluded on 25 May 2018. Season 2 premiered on 11 November 2019, but did not complete its broadcast; after the episodes "Sibling Rivalry/Dog Whistling" aired on 29 November 2019, the rest of the season would not air on the channel for several years, for unknown reasons. After a long hiatus, the rest of the second season was added to the 7plus website in March 2026; episodes 16-21 of the season were added on March 15, and episodes 22-26 of the season were added on March 20. These episodes were aired on television from September 4 to 10 of the same year. The show's third and final season has not yet been released in the country.

The entirety of Season 2 would see release on Kartoon Channel in the United States in November 2021. The service does not have Season 1, unlike various other American streaming services.

All three seasons have aired in English on ETV Bal Bharat in India since its launch on April 27, 2021, with Season 3 premiering sometime in May 2023. It would be the first international release of that season's episodes in English; however the season has also aired prior in Poland and China.

Showmax, a streaming service in South Africa, would also host all three seasons of the show. In either 2020 or 2021, the service had the first two seasons. It is not known when they began hosting Season 3, and eventually the show would later be removed from the service. The series, including Season 3, was added back to the service in August 2024.

=== Worldwide ===
In South Africa, the show premiered on Disney Channel on 23 April 2018. In New Zealand, the show is broadcast on TVNZ 2.

In the United States, the series was released for free, and out of order, on The Roku Channel around December 2019, although it was later removed from the service. The series was given a rating of TV-Y7. Kidoodle.TV would later stream the series. Sensical hosts a randomly assorted group of episodes, and a few episodes of the series are also available on Oznoz. All of these mentioned services only host Season 1.

In the United Kingdom, as of March 2021, episodes are available on demand via Virgin Media's Virgin Kids section. However, since these are listed by title and not by episode number, it is unclear whether any episodes have been omitted.

== Awards and nominations ==
Year	Award	Category	Result
2018	SPA Awards	Animated Series Production of the Year	Won
2019	Kidscreen Awards	Best New Series	Nominated
2019	Pulcinella Awards	Best Kids TV Series	Nominated
