= Marg Downey =

Australian comedian (born 1961)

- Born: Margaret Cecilia Louise Downey; 5 May 1961 (age 65); Melbourne, Victoria, Australia
- Occupations: Actress, comedian, writer
- Years active: 1984−present

Margaret Cecilia Louise Downey (born 5 May 1961) is an Australian comedian and actress, best known for her roles in The D Generation, Fast Forward and Full Frontal.

== Early life and education ==
Downey grew up in a middle-class Catholic family in the Melbourne suburb of East Malvern in an eight-child family. Her father worked as a chartered accountant. She attended Sacré Cœur School (with fellow comedian Jane Turner) in Glen Iris, and then studied Arts/Law at the University of Melbourne, where she resided at Newman College. At university, she began to perform in university revues, and auditioned for performing arts courses at the National Institute of Dramatic Art, the Victorian College of the Arts and the University of Melbourne, but was not successful in gaining entry to any of them.

== Career ==
Downey first rose to prominence in the sketch comedy program The D-Generation on the Australian Broadcasting Corporation in the late 1980s. She subsequently appeared in later sketch comedy series with other members of The D-Generation, including Fast Forward, Full Frontal and Something Stupid. In these, she was known for her portrayals of a news anchor, a stern SBS presenter and for her spot-on impression of current affairs host Jana Wendt. Her spoof of "The What's On SBS Presenter" satirised the eccentricity of SBS programming, displaying grim masochistic determination to "not miss a moment of this scintillating entertainment".

Downey starred in the 2001 Network 10 comedy series Sit Down, Shut Up, playing the role of Principal Sue which was played by American comedian Kenan Thompson in the 2009 American Fox television re-make of the original Australian series. The animated American version was produced and written by Mitch Hurwitz, of Arrested Development fame.

In 2005, Downey was cast as a regular player in Seven's live comedy sketch show Let Loose Live, but the show was cancelled after just two episodes due to low ratings. The following year, she appeared in the sketch show Magda's Funny Bits alongside Magda Szubanski. In this show, she recreated her role as infomercial host Janelle, first developed on Fast Forward.

In 2018, she voiced Stanley "Stan" Stinkleton and the narrator in the kids TV series, Kitty Is Not a Cat.

In 2021 Downey joined the cast of ABC Drama The Newsreader in the role of Evelyn Walters, Downey reprised the role for the second and third seasons of the show.

=== Comedy style ===
Downey's television roles are often authority figures or professional women with slightly eccentric personalities, such as Principal Sue in Sit Down, Shut Up and the "relationship-counselor" Marion seen in comedy series Kath & Kim. On Fast Forward, Marg Downey appeared in a lot of sketches with Steve Vizard, such as Eyeball News, The Midday Show, Candid Camera, The Cosby Show and Get Smart. Downey also played Clancy in the Skippy send-up, and appeared in send-ups of I Dream Of Jeannie, Mr Ed and Bewitched.

== Filmography ==
=== Film appearances ===
Year	Title	Role	Notes	Ref
2023	Jones Family Christmas	Sandra		
2017	The Birth	Midwife	Short	
2012	Kath & Kimderella	Marion		
2012	Christmas Clay	Kate	Short	
2010	Us	Nell	Short	
2010	Oranges and Sunshine	Miss Hutchinson		
2010	Matching Jack	Nurse Celia		
2009	The Wake	Ellen	Short	
2004	Under the Radar	Maxine		
2002	The Merchant of Fairness	Mrs Rowe		
2002	The Real Thing	Psychologist		
2002	Guru Wayne	Mrs Marsh		
2002	Queen of the Damned	Talamascan		
2000	The Magic Pudding	Various (voice)		
2000	Beware of Greeks....Bearing Guns	Policewoman		
1996	Zone 39	Computer (voice)		

=== Television appearances ===
Year	Title	Role	Notes	Ref
2026	Ground Up	Catherine la Fontaine	6 episodes	
2021–25	The Newsreader	Evelyn Walters	18 episodes	
2021–22	Fisk	Lindy	2 episodes	
2018–19	Kitty Is Not a Cat	Narrator/Stanley	82 episodes (voice)	
2018	Back In Very Small Business	Yvonne Giradoux	5 episodes	
2017	Get Krack!n	McCartney's Mum	1 episode	
2017	The Other Guy	Wilma	1 episode	
2017	Top of the Lake	Isadore	3 episodes	
2017	Newton's Law	Melinda Whitley	1 episode	
2016	Dogstar: Christmas in Space	Alice / Daina / Greta Clark (voice)	TV Movie	
2015	Open Slather	Various	20 episodes	
2014–15	The Doctor Blake Mysteries	Evelyn Toohey	2 episodes	
2014	The Flamin' Thongs	Crystal Woman (voice)	1 episode	
2012	Exchange Student Zero	Happy Peach Flower / Peg (voice)	TV Movie	
2012	House Husbands	Principal Moon	1 episode	
2010–12	Wakkaville	Various (voice)	25 episodes	
2010	City Homicide	Jane Clegg	1 episode	
2008	Very Small Business	Yvonne	1 episode	
2007–11	Dogstar	Great / Alice / Daina	52 episodes	
2007	The Starter Wife	Proper Lady	1 episode	
2006	Nightmares and Dreamscapes	Judy Diment	1 episode	
2005	Let Loose Live	Various	2 episodes	
2002–04	Kath & Kim	Marion	6 episodes	
2001	Horace and Tina	Mrs Belevedere	1 episode	
2001	The Bob Downe Show	Janelle	1 episode	
2000	The New Adventures of Ocean Girl	Elgar/ Various	10 episodes	
2000	Sit Down, Shut Up	Sue Dirkin	13 episodes	
2000	Gloria's House	Various (voice)	TV Series	
1999	The Late Report	Various	TV Series	
1998	The Silver Brumby	Mrs. Dingo/Eee	1 episode	
1998	Something Stupid	Various	6 episodes	
1998	The Games	Radio Newsreader	1 episode	
1998	Good Guys Bad Guys	Glynnis Filch	1 episode	
1997–98	Li'l Elvis and the Truckstoppers	Janet Rig / Eileen	26 episodes	
1997	Get a Life	The Nanny	TV series	
1995–02	Blue Heelers	Kaye / Kanga / Karen	3 episodes	
1994	Economy Class	Sue Atherton	TV Movie	
1993–94	Full Frontal (Australian TV series)	Guest	7 episodes	
1993	The Making of Nothing	Diane Feust	TV Movie	
1993	A Royal Commission into the Australian Economy	Dame Victoria Market	TV Movie	
1992	Bligh	Yvette / Frances	2 episodes	
1991	Turn it Up	Aggie	TV Movie	
1989–92	Fast Forward	Various	90 episodes	
1988–89	The D-Generation Goes Commercial	Various	4 episodes	
1986–87	The D-Generation	Various	16 episodes	
1986	The Fast Lane	Nadene	1 episode	

== Accolades ==
Year	Format	Award	Category	Result
2021	Television	AACTA Award	Best Supporting Actress in a Drama	Nominated
2024	Television	AACTA Award	Best Supporting Actress in a Drama	Nominated
