= List of Blue Heelers episodes =

The following is a list of episodes from the Australian police-drama, Blue Heelers, which premiered on 18 January 1994 and concluded on 4 June 2006, due to its cancellation by the Seven Network. Blue Heelers, which was created by Hal McElroy and Tony Morphett, and produced by Southern Star, ran for thirteen seasons and a total of 510 episodes. Blue Heelers won a total of 25 Logie Awards, five of which were the Gold Logie, 3 AFI Awards, 3 People's Choice Awards, and 1 AWGIE Awards.

== Series overview ==
Season	Episodes	Originally released	
Season	Episodes	First released	Last released
1	45	18 January 1994	22 November 1994
2	41	21 February 1995	21 November 1995
3	42	12 February 1996	26 November 1996
4	42	10 February 1997	25 November 1997
5	41	24 February 1998	25 November 1998
6	42	10 February 1999	24 November 1999
7	41	9 February 2000	22 November 2000
8	42	21 February 2001	28 November 2001
9	40	13 February 2002	20 November 2002
10	42	12 February 2003	26 November 2003
11	39	4 February 2004	5 November 2004
12	42	2 February 2005	26 November 2005
13	11	1 April 2006	4 June 2006

== Episodes ==
=== Season 1 (1994) ===
No. overall	No. in season	Title	Directed by	Written by	Australian air date
1	1	"A Woman's Place"	Mark Callan	Tony Morphett	18 January 1994
2	2	"Doing It Tough"	Gary Conway	Peter Kinloch	25 January 1994
3	3	"Why Give People Rights?"	Paul Moloney	John Upton	1 February 1994
4	4	"Wives"	Judith John-Story	Anne Brooksbank	8 February 1994
5	5	"Waiting for Apples"	Alister Smart	Graeme Koetsveld	15 February 1994
6	6	"Apprehended Violence"	Gary Conway	Greg Haddrick; Tony Morphett	22 February 1994
7	7	"Life After Death"	Paul Moloney	Ted Roberts	1 March 1994
8	8	"Domino Effect"	Judith John-Story	Tony Morphett	8 March 1994
9	9	"Diary Entry"	Julian McSwiney	Tony Morphett	15 March 1994
10	10	"Visions Splendid"	Gary Conway	John Upton	22 March 1994
11	11	"Abandoned"	Paul Moloney	Anne Brooksbank	26 March 1994
12	12	"Damaged Goods"	Judith John-Story	Howard Griffiths	5 April 1994
13	13	"Armed and Dangerous"	Steve Mann	Peter Kinloch	15 April 1994
14	14	"Reunion"	Gary Conway	Tony Morphett	19 April 1994
15	15	"Family Ties"	Alister Smart	Ysabelle Dean	26 April 1994
16	16	"Theft"	Chris Langman	Anne Brooksbank	3 May 1994
17	17	"Meat is Hung, Men are Hanged"	Steve Mann	Everett De Roche	10 May 1994
18	18	"Conduct Unbecoming"	Gary Conway	Ray Harding	17 May 1994
19	19	"Good Cop, Bad Cop"	Alister Smart	Tony Morphett	24 May 1994
20	20	"The Final Season"	Chris Adshead	Tim Gooding	31 May 1994
21	21	"Payback"	Steve Mann	Judith Colquhoun	7 June 1994
22	22	"Sex, Lies and Videotapes"	Gary Conway	Patrick Edgworth	14 June 1994
23	23	"Men in Her Life"	Riccardo Pellizzeri	Tony Morphett	21 June 1994
24	24	"A Bird in the Hand"	Richard Sarell	Ysabelle Dean	28 June 1994
25	25	"Missing"	Steve Mann	Anne Brooksbank	5 July 1994
26	26	"Day in Court"	Mark Piper	Justin Glockerla; Stephen Measday	12 July 1994
27	27	"Nowhere to Run"	Riccardo Pellizzeri	Susan Hore	19 July 1994
28	28	"Consequences"	Richard Sarell	John Upton	26 July 1994
29	29	"A Matter of Trust"	Steve Mann	Anne Brooksbank	2 August 1994
30	30	"Necessary Force"	Mark Piper	Tony Morphett	9 August 1994
31	31	"Bitter Harvest"	Riccardo Pellizzeri	Justin Glockerla; Alan Hopgood	16 August 1994
32	32	"Crazy Like a Fox"	Alister Smart	John Lord; Tony Morphett	23 August 1994
33	33	"Old Dogs, New Tricks"	Steve Mann	Rachel Lewis	30 August 1994
34	34	"Labour of Love"	Mark Piper	Ysabelle Dean	6 September 1994
35	35	"Escape Route"	Chris Martin-Jones	Judith Colquhoun	13 September 1994
36	36	"Adverse Possession"	Riccardo Pellizzeri	John Coulter; Justin Glockerla	20 September 1994
37	37	"The Folly of Youth"	Steve Mann	Susan Hore	27 September 1994
38	38	"Face Value"	Mark Piper	Hugh Stuckey	4 October 1994
39	39	"Suspicion"	Chris Martin-Jones	Anne Brooksbank	11 October 1994
40	40	"Without Intent"	Riccardo Pellizzeri	Peter Gawler	18 October 1994
41	41	"Family Matters"	Steve Mann	David Allen	25 October 1994
42	42	"The First Stone"	Mark Piper	Tony Morphett	1 November 1994
43	43	"Skin Deep"	Chris Martin-Jones	Ysabelle Dean	8 November 1994
44	44	"Luck of the Draw"	Riccardo Pellizzeri	Cassandra Carter	15 November 1994
45	45	"Damage Control"	Gary Conway	Judith Colquhoun; Michaeley O'Brien	22 November 1994

=== Season 2 (1995) ===
No. overall	No. in season	Title	Directed by	Written by	Australian air date
46	1	"Without a Trace"	Mark Piper	Michaeley O'Brien	21 February 1995
47	2	"A Question of Courage"	Richard Sarell	Anne Brooksbank	28 February 1995
48	3	"A Cruel Reality"	Riccardo Pellizzeri	Susan Hore	7 March 1995
49	4	"Mates"	Gary Conway	Hugh Stuckey	14 March 1995
50	5	"Out of Harm's Way"	Mark Piper	Peter Gawler	21 March 1995
51	6	"Breaking the Cycle"	Richard Sarell	Judith Colquhoun	28 March 1995
52	7	"Heavy Traffic"	Riccardo Pellizzeri	Michael Winter	4 April 1995
53	8	"Gun Law"	Gary Conway	David Allen	11 April 1995
54	9	"Ripples on the Pond"	Brendan Maher	John Coulter	18 April 1995
55	10	"Protected Species"	Mark Piper	Max Singer	25 April 1995
56	11	"Stop for a Bite"	Karl Steinberg	Tony Morphett	2 May 1995
57	12	"The Long and Winding Road"	Steve Mann	Anne Brooksbank	9 May 1995
58	13	"The Old School Tie"	Julian McSwiney	Patrick Edgeworth	16 May 1995
59	14	"Motherlove"	Mark Piper	Susan Hore	23 May 1995
60	15	"Dead Ringer"	Karl Steinberg	Shane Brennan	30 May 1995
61	16	"The Lolita Blues"	Steve Mann	Peter Gawler	6 June 1995
62	17	"Shadowman"	Richard Sarell	Anne Brooksbank	13 June 1995
63	18	"Trust Me"	Chris Martin-Jones	Ruth Field	20 June 1995
64	19	"Parenting"	Mark Piper	Judith Colquhoun	27 June 1995
65	20	"Gun Crazy"	Gary Conway	Russell Haig	4 July 1995
66	21	"With Prejudice"	Richard Sarell	Michaeley O'Brien	11 July 1995
67	22	"Paranoia (1)"	Chris Martin-Jones	Michael Winter	18 July 1995
68	23	"Paranoia (2)"	Mark Piper	Peter Gawler	25 July 1995
69	24	"The Collector"	Julian McSwiney	Tony Morphett and Wal Saunders	1 August 1995
70	25	"Homecoming Queen"	Mark Piper	John Wood	8 August 1995
71	26	"Secrets"	Chris Martin-Jones	Margaret Plumb	15 August 1995
72	27	"The Last Straw"	Richard Sarrell and Riccardo Pellizzeri	Susan Hore	22 August 1995
73	28	"The Best of Rivals"	Brian McDuffie	Fred Clarke	29 August 1995
74	29	"Swings and Roundabouts"	Julian McSwiney	David Allen	5 September 1995
75	30	"Double Jeopardy (1)"	Chris Martin-Jones	Ysabelle Dean	12 September 1995
76	31	"Double Jeopardy (2)"	Mark Piper	Michaeley O'Brien	19 September 1995
77	32	"The Mongrel Factor"	Brian McDuffie	Peter Gawler	26 September 1995
78	33	"Just Desserts"	Julian McSwiney	Anne Brooksbank	3 October 1995
79	34	"Unnatural Death"	Chris Martin-Jones	Cassandra Carter	10 October 1995
80	35	"Tough Love"	Mark Piper	Louise Crane	17 October 1995
81	36	"A Question of Loyalties"	Brian McDuffie	Michael Winter	24 October 1995
82	37	"Vow of Silence"	Steve Mann	Robert Harris and Peter Dick	17 October 1995
83	38	"Juggling with Smoke"	Gary Conway	Dave Worthington	30 October 1995
84	39	"The Discount Suit"	Karl Steinberg	Fred Clarke	7 November 1995
85	40	"Brotherly Love (1)"	Chris Martin-Jones	David Allen	14 November 1995
86	41	"Brotherly Love (2)"	Brian McDuffe	Peter Gawler	21 November 1995

=== Season 3 (1996) ===
No. overall	No. in season	Title	Directed by	Written by	Australian air date
87	1	"Once Only Withdrawal (1)"	Riccardo Pellizzeri	Tony Morphett	12 February 1996
88	2	"Once Only Withdrawal (2)"	Gary Conway	Tony Morphett	12 February 1996
89	3	"Second Innings"	Richard Jasek	Howard Griffiths	13 February 1996
90	4	"Spider Man"	Chris Martin-Jones	Ysabelle Dean	20 February 1996
91	5	"Day of Reckoning"	Richard Sarell	Susan Hore	27 February 1996
92	6	"Sex and Death"	Kevin Carlin	Michaeley O'Brien	5 March 1996
93	7	"Not in my Backyard"	Chris Martin-Jones	Cassandra Carter	12 March 1996
94	8	"All Part of the Service"	Richard Sarell	Dave Worthington	19 March 1996
95	9	"Dog Days"	Richard Jasek	David Allen	26 March 1996
96	10	"An Act of Random Violence"	Chris Langman	Peter Gawler	2 April 1996
97	11	"Unfinished Business"	Steve Mann	Peter Dick	9 April 1996
98	12	"Happy Families"	Gary Conway	John Wood	16 April 1996
99	13	"Priorities"	Karl Steinberg	Fred Clarke	23 April 1996
100	14	"A Fair Crack of the Whip (1)"	Chris Langman	Tony Morphett	30 April 1996
101	15	"A Fair Crack of the Whip (2)"	Steve Mann	Annie Beach	7 May 1996
102	16	"Under Pressure"	Gary Conway	Margaret Plum	14 May 1996
103	17	"Fight Dirty"	Karl Steinberg	David Boutland	21 May 1996
104	18	"Art of Deception"	Chris Langman	David Allen	28 May 1996
105	19	"Old Sins, Long Shadows"	Steve Mann	Jennifer Rowe	4 June 1996
106	20	"In Unity Is Strength"	Richard Sarell	Dave Worthington	11 June 1996
107	21	"The Kremin Factor"	Richard jasek	Peter Gawler	18 June 1996
108	22	"Shelter from the Storm"	Chris Langman	Cassandra Carter	25 June 1996
109	23	"Principle of the Thing"	Richard Sarell	John Banas	2 July 1996
110	24	"Mind Games"	Kevin Carlin	Susan Hore	9 July 1996
111	25	"Duty of Care"	Richard Jasek	Peter Dick	16 July 1996
112	26	"Other People's Lives"	Chris Langman	John Banas	6 August 1996
113	27	"A Gift From God"	Kevin Carlin	Tony Morphett	13 August 1996
114	28	"Waiting to Happen"	Richard Sarell	David Phillips	20 August 1996
115	29	"Bewitched"	Richard Jasek	Cassandra Carter	27 August 1996
116	30	"Mud Sticks"	Steve Mann	David Boutland	3 September 1996
117	31	"The Angel's Share"	Kevin Carlin	John Banas	10 September 1996
118	32	"Something for Nothing"	Raymond Quint	David Allen	17 September 1996
119	33	"Winner Takes All"	Gary Conway	Ysabelle Dean	24 September 1996
120	34	"I Spy"	Karl Steinberg	Susan Hore	1 October 1996
121	35	"Reality Bytes"	Steve Mann	Dave Worthington	8 October 1996
122	36	"In The Gun (1)"	Kevin Carlin	Tony Morphett	15 October 1996
123	37	"In The Gun (2)"	Raymond Quint	Michael Winter	22 October 1996
124	38	"Buck Naked"	Gary Conway	Dave Marsh	29 October 1996
125	39	"Friendly Fire"	Steve Mann	Cassandra Carter	5 November 1996
126	40	"Half a Second"	Graham Thorburn	Anthony Ellis	12 November 1996
127	41	"Miss Mount Thomas"	Kevin Carlin	Beverley Evans	19 November 1996
128	42	"Dead or Alive"	Steve Mann	David Allen	26 November 1996

=== Season 4 (1997) ===
No. overall	No. in season	Title	Directed by	Written by	Australian air date
129	1	"Mad Dogs and Englishmen"	Richard Sarell	Ysabelle Dean	10 February 1997
130	2	"Under Siege"	Chris Langman	Susan Hore	10 February 1997
131	3	"Working Lunch"	Kevin Carlin	Bill Garner	11 February 1997
132	4	"Immaculate Misconception"	Grant Brown	John Wood	18 February 1997
133	5	"Reports of Damage and Loss"	Richard Sarell	John Banas	25 February 1997
134	6	"Fowl Play"	Chris Langman	Peter Dick	4 March 1997
135	7	"The Luck of the Irish"	Kevin Carlin	Cassandra Carter	11 March 1997
136	8	"Bloodstained Angels"	Grant Brown	David Phillips	18 March 1997
137	9	"Charity Begins at Home"	Richard Sarell	Annie Beach	8 April 1997
138	10	"Fool for Love"	Richard Jasek	Emma Honey	15 April 1997
139	11	"There Last Night"	Raymond Quint	David Boutland	22 April 1997
140	12	"Gold"	Chris Langman	Ysabelle Dean	29 April 1997
141	13	"Fool's Gold"	Gary Conway	Tony Morphett	6 May 1997
142	14	"Grave Matters"	Kevin Carlin	David Allen	13 May 1997
143	15	"Loose Cannons"	Steve Mann	David Marsh	20 May 1997
144	16	"Lean on Me"	Gary Conway	Kathie Armstrong	27 May 1997
145	17	"Random Breath"	Chris Langman	Susan Hore	3 June 1997
146	18	"Close Encounters"	Kevin Carlin	Stephen Measday	10 June 1997
147	19	"Buckley's Chance"	Steve Mann	Rick Held	17 June 1997
148	20	"No Means No"	Raymond Quint	Michael Winter	24 June 1997
149	21	"Poetic Justice"	Fiona Banks	Bill Garner	1 July 1997
150	22	"Left in Trust"	Kevin Carlin	Beverley Evans	8 July 1997
151	23	"Sick Puppy"	Steve Mann	Peter Dick	15 July 1997
152	24	"Sisterly Love"	Fiona Banks	Jenny Lewis	22 July 1997
153	25	"Can't Take a Joke"	Grant Brown	Roger Dunn	29 July 1997
154	26	"Every Contact Leaves Its Trace"	Graham Thorburn	Cassandra Carter	5 August 1997
155	27	"Playing Games"	Chris Langman	David Allen	12 August 1997
156	28	"Counting Chickens"	Fiona Banks	John Banas	19 August 1997
157	29	"Drag Line"	Grant Brown	Tony Morphett	26 August 1997
158	30	"Closing Ranks"	Steve Mann	Rick Held	2 September 1997
159	31	"Off the Air"	Peter Sharp	David Marsh	9 September 1997
160	32	"The Scarecrow"	Russell Burton	David Boutland	16 September 1997
161	33	"Safe as Houses"	Richard Sarell	Craig Wilkins	23 September 1997
162	34	"Our Patch"	Fiona Banks	Anthony Ellis	30 September 1997
163	35	"The All Seeing Eye"	Raymond Quint	Cassandra Carter	7 October 1997
164	36	"Playing Possum"	Russel Burton	David Allen and Judith Colquoun	14 October 1997
165	37	"Collateral Damage"	Karl Steinberg	Bill Garner	21 October 1997
166	38	"The Big Picture"	Richard Sarell	Russell Winter	28 October 1997
167	39	"Settlement Postponed"	Richard Jasek	Tony Morphett	4 November 1997
168	40	"Containing the Rage"	Karl Steinberg	Paul Davies	11 November 1997
169	41	"The Civil Dead"	Raymond Quint	Susan Hore	18 November 1997
170	42	"Possession"	Russell Burton	David Boutland	25 November 1997

=== Season 5 (1998) ===
No. overall	No. in season	Title	Directed by	Written by	Australian air date
171	1	"Secrets (1)"	Richard Jasek	Jenny Lewis	24 February 1998
172	2	"Secrets (2)"	Russell Burton	David Marsh	25 February 1998
173	3	"Smoke and Mirrors"	Karl Steinberg	Cassandra Carter	4 March 1998
174	4	"Moving House"	Fiona Banks	David Allen	11 March 1998
175	5	"Piece of Cake"	Steve Mann	Bill Garner	18 March 1998
176	6	"Keeping Mum"	Russell Burton	Peter Dick & David Allen	25 March 1998
177	7	"Letting Go"	Richard Jasek	Paul Davies	1 April 1998
178	8	"The Whistle Blower"	Simon Phillips	Susan Hore	8 April 1998
179	9	"King of Hearts"	Steve Mann	Ysabelle Dean	15 April 1998
180	10	"When Love's Not Enough"	Richard Jasek	Judy Colquhoun	22 April 1998
181	11	"Stars in Their Eyes"	Kevin Carlin	Matthew Williams	29 April 1998
182	12	"She Killed Santa"	Richard Burton	Dave Marsh	6 May 1998
183	13	"This Mortal Coil"	Justin McSwiney	Cassandra Carter	13 May 1998
184	14	"Waste of Space"	Chris Langman	Jenny Lewis	20 May 1998
185	15	"A Bit of Biff"	Ray Quint	Bill Garner	27 May 1998
186	16	"Mr. Lucky"	Fiona Banks	John Banas	3 June 1998
187	17	"Deception"	Russell Burton	Michael Winter	10 June 1998
188	18	"Catch of the Day"	Pino Amenta	David Anthony	17 June 1998
189	19	"Deed not the Breed"	Richard Sarell	Ysabelle Dean	24 June 1998
190	20	"Victims"	Richard Sarell	David Boutland	1 July 1998
191	21	"The Living Dead"	Richard Jasek	Michaeley O'Brien	8 July 1998
192	22	"Spinning the Yarn"	Fiona Banks	Mary McCormick	15 July 1998
193	23	"The Dark Side"	Russell Burton	David Allen	22 July 1998
194	24	"Intervention"	Fiona Banks	Cass Carter	29 July 1998
195	25	"Murder in Mind"	Richard Jasek	John Banas	5 August 1998
196	26	"Blood Ties"	Steve Mann	David Marsh	12 August 1998
197	27	"Little Monsters"	Chris Langman	Bill Garner	19 August 1998
198	28	"Nine Lives"	Grant Brown	Tony Morphett	26 August 1998
199	29	"Missing Digits"	Richard Jasek	Grace Morris & Caroline Stanton	2 September 1998
200	30	"Child's Play"	Steve Mann	Michael Winter & David Allen	9 September 1998
201	31	"False Alarms"	Karl Steinberg	Geraldine Pilkington	16 September 1998
202	32	"Nobody's Perfect"	Grant Brown	Caroline Stanton & Mary McCormick	23 September 1998
203	33	"Turkish Delight"	Richard Jasek	Cassandra Carter	30 September 1998
204	34	"Like Father Like Son"	Raymond Quint	Bill Garner	7 October 1998
205	35	"Birds of Prey"	Chris Langman	David Marsh	14 October 1998
206	36	"Mates Rates"	Richard Sarell	Beverly Evans	21 October 1998
207	37	"Wedding Blues"	Karl Steinberg	David Boutland	28 October 1998
208	38	"All in the Family"	Raymond Quint	Ysabelle Dean	4 November 1998
209	39	"Hunted"	Chris Langman	Jenny Lewis	11 November 1998
210	40	"Rotten Apple (1)"	Fiona Banks	Mary McCormick	18 November 1998
211	41	"Rotten Apple (2)"	Richard Sarell	Rachel Lewis	25 November 1998

=== Season 6 (1999) ===
No. overall	No. in season	Title	Directed by	Written by	Australian air date
212	1	"Dancing with the Devil (1)"	Robert Klenner	Bill Garner	10 February 1999
213	2	"Dancing with the Devil (2)"	Kevin Carlin	Harry Jordan	17 February 1999
214	3	"Winning at all Costs"	Esben Storm	Beverley Evans	24 February 1999
215	4	"Love is a Drug"	Steve Mann	Dave Worthington	3 March 1999
216	5	"An Eye for an Eye"	Steve Mann	Tony Morphett	10 March 1999
217	6	"Wishful Thinking"	Richard Jasek	Jenny Lewis	17 March 1999
218	7	"Pillow Talk"	Karl Steinberg	Mary Graham	24 March 1999
219	8	"The Good Weed"	Fiona Banks	Cassandra Carter	31 March 1999
220	9	"By the Book"	Kevin Carlin	David Allen	7 April 1999
221	10	"Dirty Money"	Richard Jasek	Dave Marsh	14 April 1999
222	11	"Married to the Job"	Faith Martin	Beverley Evans and Kelly Levefer	21 April 1999
223	12	"Web of Lies"	Raymond Quint	Roger Dunn and Dave Worthington	28 April 1999
224	13	"End of the Road"	Pino Amenta	Brian Bell and John Banas	5 May 1999
225	14	"Lies and Whispers"	Chris Langman	Cassandra Carter	12 May 1999
226	15	"Jack of Hearts"	Fiona Banks	Bob Cameron	19 May 1999
227	16	"The Grace of God"	Grant Brown	Jenny Lewis	26 May 1999
228	17	"The Stag"	Declan Eames	Bill Garner	2 June 1999
229	18	"The Good Life"	Chris Langman	Harry Jordan	9 June 1999
230	19	"Perfect Match"	Fiona Banks	Deborah Parsons	16 June 1999
231	20	"Oil and Water"	Grant Brown	Lyn Ogilvy	23 June 1999
232	21	"Smoke gets in your Eyes"	Declan Eames	David Allen	30 June 1999
233	22	"King of the Kids"	Chris Langman	Jenny Lewis	7 July 1999
234	23	"Full Circle"	Kevin Carlin	Dave Worthington	14 July 1999
235	24	"Behind the Badge"	Fiona Banks	Piers Hobson	21 July 1999
236	25	"The Angel Cruise"	Richard Jasek	Peter Dick	28 July 1999
237	26	"Downsizing"	Richard Sarell	Dave Marsh	4 August 1999
238	27	"The Deepest Cut"	Kevin Carlin	Emma Honey and Peter Dick	11 August 1999
239	28	"Hello-Goodbye"	Karl Steinberg	Ysabelle Dean	18 August 1999
240	29	"Whip Crack-Away"	Richard jasek	Tony Morphett	25 August 1999
241	30	"Price of Silence"	Richard Sarell	Cassandra Carter	1 September 1999
242	31	"Without Judgment"	Roger Hodgman	Geraldine Pilkington	8 September 1999
243	32	"Smoke Without Fire"	Kevin Carlin	David Allen	15 September 1999
244	33	"Starry Starry Night"	Declan Eames	John Banas	22 September 1999
245	34	"Paradise Lost"	Richard Sarell	Bill Garner	29 September 1999
246	35	"The Game"	Julian McSwiney	Dave March	6 October 1999
247	36	"Miracle at Rabbit Creek"	Kevin Carlin	Tony Morphett	13 October 1999
248	37	"Second Chance"	Steve Mann	David Boutland	20 October 1999
249	38	"The Price of Friendship"	Richard Sarell	Karin Altmann	27 October 1999
250	39	"Under Fire"	Raymond Quint	Peter Dick	3 November 1999
251	40	"Fifty-Fifty"	Peter Sharp	Lyn Ogilvy	10 November 1999
252	41	"Kids"	Steve Mann	Deborah Parsons	17 November 1999
253	42	"Be Prepared"	Steve Mann	Bill Garner	24 November 1999

=== Season 7 (2000) ===
No. overall	No. in season	Title	Directed by	Written by	Australian air date
254	1	"Loose Ends"	Grant Brown	John Banas	9 February 2000
255	2	"One More Day"	Raymond Quint	Coral Drouyn	16 February 2000
256	3	"Aftermath"	Graham Thorburn	Tony Morphett	23 February 2000
257	4	"Shadow of Doubt"	Grant Brown	Chris Phillips	1 March 2000
258	5	"A Chip off the Old Block"	Peter Sharp	Jon Stephens	8 March 2000
259	6	"Code of Honour"	Fiona Banks	David Worthington	15 March 2000
260	7	"Life Class"	Chris Langman	Karin Altman	22 March 2000
261	8	"Vanishing Act"	Raymond Quint	Cassandra Carter	29 March 2000
262	9	"Unfinished Business"	Roger Hodgman	Bill Garner	5 April 2000
263	10	"Out of the Shadows"	Steve Mann	Jon Banas	12 April 2000
264	11	"Dance Crazy"	Chris Langman	David Allen	19 April 2000
265	12	"Welcome Back"	Raymond Quint	Piers Hobson and David Allen	26 April 2000
266	13	"Broken Windows"	Kevin Carlin	David Boutland and Peter Dick	3 May 2000
267	14	"Something Fishy"	Roger Hodgman	Jon Stevens	10 May 2000
268	15	"Dead For Quids"	Steve Mann	David Anthony	17 May 2000
269	16	"On the Road"	Richard Jasek	Bill Garner	24 May 2000
270	17	"Lost and Found"	Chris Langman	Coral Drouyn	31 May 2000
271	18	"Rank Outsider"	Kevin Carlin	David Worthington	7 June 2000
272	19	"Conduct Endangering Life"	Steve Mann	Chris Phillips	14 June 2000
273	20	"A Little Faith"	Esben Storm	Cassandra Carter	21 June 2000
274	21	"The Gumshoe"	Kevin Carlin	David Allen	28 June 2000
275	22	"Small Potatoes"	Chris Langman	Piers Hobson	5 July 2000
276	23	"A Good Kid"	Grant Brown	John Stevens	12 July 2000
277	24	"Fair Go"	Richard Jasek	Bill Garner	19 July 2000
278	25	"Cop it Sweet"	Declan Eames	Marieke Hardy	26 July 2000
279	26	"Moving On"	Richard jasek	Kelly Lefever	2 August 2000
280	27	"Bank on It"	Grant Brown	Chris Phillips	9 August 2000
281	28	"Hard Feelings"	Kelly Lefever	Peter Dick	16 August 2000
282	29	"Running of the Rams"	Declan Eames	Tony Morphett	23 August 2000
283	30	"Tangled Web"	Roger Hodgman	Lyn Ogilvy	30 August 2000
284	31	"On Your Bike"	Raymond Quint	David Allen	6 September 2000
285	32	"Stir Crazy"	Richard Sarell	Piers Hobson	6 September 2000
286	33	"Broken Promises (1)"	Steve Mann	Michael Winter	4 October 2000
287	34	"Broken Promises (2)"	Raymond Quint	Bill Garner	4 October 2000
288	35	"Wheeling and Dealing"	Mike Smith	David Worthington	11 October 2000
289	36	"Mind Over Matter"	Richard Sarell	Michael Brindley	18 October 2000
290	37	"Paper Chase"	Graham Thorburn	Cassandra Carter	25 October 2000
291	38	"Bully Boys"	Fiona Banks	Chris Phillips and David Allen	1 November 2000
292	39	"Bloodlines"	Declan Eames	Tony Morphett	8 November 2000
293	40	"Ten Percent"	Richard Sarell	Michaeley O'Brien	15 November 2000
294	41	"Leg Work"	Peter Sharp	David Allen	22 November 2000

=== Season 8 (2001) ===
No. overall	No. in season	Title	Directed by	Written by	Australian air date
295	1	"The Blame Game (1)"	Grant Brown	Bill Garner	21 February 2001
296	2	"The Blame Game (2)"	Declan Eames	Bill Garner and Harriet Smith	28 February 2001
297	3	"Deadly Fascination"	Kevin Carlin	David Boutland	7 March 2001
298	4	"Letter of the Law"	Chris Langman	Tony Morphett	14 March 2001
299	5	"A Bit on the Side"	Grant Brown	Dave Worthington	21 March 2001
300	6	"Tough Nut"	Declan Eames	Cassandra Carter	28 March 2001
301	7	"The Fine Print"	Raymond Quint	Peter Dick	4 April 2001
302	8	"Family Reserve"	Kevin Carlin	Jo Merle and John Banas	11 April 2001
303	9	"Chop Chop"	Chris Langman	David Allen	18 April 2001
304	10	"Blood"	Roger Hodgman	Deborah Parsons	25 April 2001
305	11	"They Don't Make Them Like They Used To"	Raymond Quint	Chris Corbett	2 May 2001
306	12	"Love and Money"	Graham Thorburn	David Boutland	9 May 2001
307	13	"Fowl Play"	Peter Sharp	Bill Garner	16 May 2001
308	14	"Fooling Around"	Kevin Carlin	Michaeley O'Brien	23 May 2001
309	15	"Death By Flight"	Chris Langman	David Worthington	30 May 2001
310	16	"A Friend Indeed"	Richard jasek	Yuki Asano and Caroline Stanton	6 June 2001
311	17	"The Manly Art"	Kevin Carlin	Caroline Stanton	13 June 2001
312	18	"Falling Part 1"	Peter Sharp	Tony Morphett	20 June 2001
313	19	"Falling Part 2"	Grant Brown	John Banas	20 June 2001
314	20	"Winners And Losers"	Aarne Neeme	David Allen	27 June 2001
315	21	"No Place Like Home"	Riccardo Pelizzeri	Deborah Parsons and David Allen	11 July 2001
316	22	"Dragged"	Peter Sharp	Bill Garner	18 July 2001
317	23	"Baby Love"	Steve Mann	Cliff Green	25 July 2001
318	24	"An Inspector Calls"	Roger Hodgman	Dave Worthington	1 August 2001
319	25	"Dinosaurs"	Steve Mann	Chris Corbett	8 August 2001
320	26	"Charming"	Esben Storm	Cassandra Carter	15 August 2001
321	27	"The Sins of the Father"	Fiona Banks	Carol Williams	22 August 2001
322	28	"Poisoned Fruit Part 1"	Denny Lawrence	Tony Morphett	29 August 2001
323	29	"Poisoned Fruit Part 2"	Roger Hodgman	Tony Morphett	5 September 2001
324	30	"Fifteen Minutes"	Fiona Banks	Abe Pogos	19 September 2001
325	31	"Copping The Flak"	Declan Eames	Caroline Stanton	26 September 2001
326	32	"Strays"	Chris Langman	Philip Dalkin	3 October 2001
327	33	"The Lord Giveth"	Declan Eames	John Banas	10 October 2001
328	34	"Credit Limit"	Daina Reid	Dave Worthington	17 October 2001
329	35	"A Hard Call"	Aarne Neeme	Bill Garner	17 October 2001
330	36	"Role Model"	Chris Langman	David Allen	24 October 2001
331	37	"A Safe Bet"	Declan Eames	John Banas and Karen Altman	31 October 2001
332	38	"A Matter of Faith"	Riccardo Pellizzeri	Ysabella Dean	7 November 2001
333	39	"Who Can You Trust?"	Fiona Banks	Caroline Stanton and Piers Hobson	11 November 2001
334	40	"Best Eaten Cold"	Chris Langman	Tony Morphett	21 November 2001
335	41	"The Real Santa"	Steve Mann	Caroline Stanton	28 November 2001
336	42	"Dreaming of a White Christmas"	Roger Hodgman	Michaeley O'Brien	28 November 2001

=== Season 9 (2002) ===
No. overall	No. in season	Title	Directed by	Written by	Australian air date
337	1	"Breaking Point Part 1"	Denny Lawrence	Dave Worthington	13 February 2002
338	2	"Breaking Point Part 2"	Declan Eames	John Banas	20 February 2002
339	3	"If It Ain't Hurtin'"	Fiona Banks	Bill Garner	27 February 2002
340	4	"Down in the Forest"	Roger Hodgman	David Allen	6 March 2002
341	5	"The Real Thing"	Daina Reid	Tom Hegarty	13 March 2002
342	6	"Rainy Night Blues"	Fiona Banks	Abe Pogos	20 March 2002
343	7	"Jack and Jill"	Peter Sharp	Ysabelle Dean	27 March 2002
344	8	"Sons and Mothers"	Ray Quint	Caroline Stanton	3 April 2002
345	9	"Say His Name"	Aarne Neeme	Tony Morphett	10 April 2002
346	10	"The Perfect Life"	Ray Quint	Michaeley O'Brien	17 April 2002
347	11	"Flushed"	Daina Reid	John Banas	24 April 2002
348	12	"Dancing on the Edge"	Peter Sharp	Bill Garner	1 May 2002
349	13	"Those That Trespass"	Aarne Neeme	Rachel Lewis	8 May 2002
350	14	"Reflection"	Fiona Banks	Petra Graf	15 May 2002
351	15	"Buddies"	Denny Lawrence	David Allen	15 May 2002
352	16	"Broken Dreams"	Fiona Banks	Carol Williams	5 June 2002
353	17	"An Old Fashioned Man"	Chris Langman	David Boutland	12 June 2002
354	18	"Of Middle Eastern Appearance"	Geoffrey Nottage	Chris Corbett	19 June 2002
355	19	"The Best Man"	Denny Lawrence	Tony Morphett	26 June 2002
356	20	"Wednesday's Child"	Deborah Niski	Anne Melville	3 July 2002
357	21	"Finders Keepers"	Ray Quint	Michaeley O'Brien	10 July 2002
358	22	"Burning Desire"	Fiona Banks	Fiona Banks	17 July 2002
359	23	"Naked Lady"	Aarne Neeme	Peter Hepworth	24 July 2002
360	24	"Private Lives"	Steve Mann	David Allen	7 August 2002
361	25	"Inside Outside"	Deborah Niski	Rob George, Rachel Lewis	7 August 2002
362	26	"The Last Jar"	Richard Frankland	Peter Dick	14 August 2002
363	27	"Stewart Vs Stewart"	Chris Langman	Jane Allen	21 August 2002
364	28	"Fishing For Dummies"	Declan Eames	John Banas	28 August 2002
365	29	"Salvation Part 1"	Aarne Neeme	Tony Morphett, Caroline Stanton	4 September 2002
366	30	"Salvation Part 2"	Roger Hodgman	Tony Morphett, Caroline Stanton	4 September 2002
367	31	"In Another Place"	Geoffrey Nottage	Leon Saunders	18 September 2002
368	32	"Parenthood"	Esben Storm	Chris Corbett	25 September 2002
369	33	"Boys Will Be Boys"	Daina Reid	Noel Maloney	2 October 2002
370	34	"Deep Water"	Chris Langman	Bill Garner	9 October 2002
371	35	"Nothing Personal"	Declan Eames	Ysabelle Dean	16 October 2002
372	36	"Teamwork"	Richard Frankland	David Boutland	23 October 2002
373	37	"Stable Mates"	Steve Mann	David Allen	30 October 2002
374	38	"Some Days"	George Ogilvie	Ted Roberts	6 November 2002
375	39	"Body of Evidence"	Chris Langman	Tony Morphett	13 November 2002
376	40	"All You Need Is Love"	Peter Sharp	Leon Saunders	20 November 2002

=== Season 10 (2003) ===
No. overall	No. in season	Title	Directed by	Written by	Australian air date
377	1	"Firebrands Part One"	Ray Quint	John Banas	12 February 2003
378	2	"Firebrands Part Two"	Ray Quint	Michael Voigt	19 February 2003
379	3	"In The Dog House"	Steve Mann	Rachel Lewis	26 February 2003
380	4	"Excuses, Excuses"	Peter Sharp	Bill Garner	5 March 2003
381	5	"Too Hard Basket"	Roger Hodgman	Ysabelle Dean	12 March 2003
382	6	"Fair Play"	Chris Langman	Rob George	19 March 2003
383	7	"The Sum of the Parts"	Richard Frankland	Dave Worthington and Tony Morphett	26 March 2003
384	8	"Bumps in the Night"	Peter Sharp	David Allen	2 April 2003
385	9	"Trust Accounts"	Declan Eames	Tony Morphett	2 April 2003
386	10	"Out of Control"	Chris Langman	Michaeley O'Brien	9 April 2003
387	11	"Love In"	Steve Mann	John Banas	23 April 2003
388	12	"Blackout"	Ray Quint	Chris Corbett	30 April 2003
389	13	"Where There's a Will"	Chris Langman	Sue Hore	7 May 2003
390	14	"Father's Day Part One"	Declan Eames	Bill Garner	14 May 2003
391	15	"Father's Day Part Two"	Arner Neeme	Ted Roberts	21 May 2003
392	16	"Dream On"	Chris Langman	David Boutland	28 May 2003
393	17	"The Ties That Bind"	Kath Hayden	David Allen	4 June 2003
394	18	"Prince Charming"	Declan Eames	Dave Worthington	11 June 2003
395	19	"The New Perfect"	Mark Piper	Tony Morphett	25 June 2003
396	20	"Playing with Fire"	Aarne Neeme	Michaeley O'Brien	2 July 2003
397	21	"A Bad Smell"	Chris Langman	John Banas	9 July 2003
398	22	"A Knife for a Knife"	Richard Frankland	Chris Corbett	16 July 2003
399	23	"A Better Mind"	Jenny Lewis	Declan Eames	23 July 2003
400	24	"Thicker Than Water"	Ray Quint	John Banas	23 July 2003
401	25	"Raging Hormones"	Chris Langman	Ysabelle Dean	30 July 2003
402	26	"A Blind Eye"	Kath Hayden	Peter Dick	6 August 2003
403	27	"Chocolate Sardines"	Steve Mann	David Allen	13 August 2003
404	28	"Too Good to Be True Part One"	Grant brown	Caroline Stanton and Peter Hepworth	20 August 2003
405	29	"Too Good to Be True Part Two"	Peter Sharp	Tony Morphett	27 August 2003
406	30	"Every Man and His Ute"	Chris Langman	Dave Worthington	3 September 2003
407	31	"Motherhood"	Richard Frankland	John Banas	10 September 2003
408	32	"A New Life"	Chris Adshead	Chris Corbett	17 September 2003
409	33	"The Lowest of the Low"	Peter Sharp	Bill Garner	24 September 2003
410	34	"Safety Last"	Chris Langman	Michaeley O'Brien	1 October 2003
411	35	"Good and Evil Part One"	Steve Mann	Leon Saunders	8 October 2003
412	36	"Good and Evil Part Two"	George Ogilvy	David Boutland	15 October 2003
413	37	"Losing the Road"	Peter Sharp	Tony Morphett	22 October 2003
414	38	"What Goes Around"	Chris Langman	Ted Roberts	29 October 2003
415	39	"Contamination"	Richard Frankland	Tony Morphett	5 November 2003
416	40	"Dirty Cheaters"	Roger Hodgman	Dave Worthington	12 November 2003
417	41	"Sexual Healing I"	Fiona Banks	Chris Corbett	26 November 2003
418	42	"Sexual Healing II"	Fiona Banks	Chris Corbett	26 November 2003

=== Season 11 (2004) ===
No. overall	No. in season	Title	Directed by	Written by	Australian air date
419	1	"Retribution Part 1"	Roger Hodgman	Michaeley O'Brien	4 February 2004
420	2	"Retribution Part 2"	Peter Sharp	Bill Garner	11 February 2004
421	3	"The Right Thing"	Declan Eames	Ysabelle Dean	18 February 2004
422	4	"Happily Ever After"	Chris Adshead	Jenny Lewis	25 February 2004
423	5	"Heirs Apparent"	Chris Langman	David Allen	3 March 2004
424	6	"A Mere Formality"	George Ogilvie	Ted Roberts	10 March 2004
425	7	"Cast the First Stone"	Kath Hayden	Tony Morphett	17 March 2004
426	8	"Great Expectations"	Steve Mann	Dave Worthington; John Banas	24 March 2004
427	9	"Off Your Face"	Chris Langman	John Banas	31 March 2004
428	10	"Running Scared"	Chris Hayden	Mary McCormick	7 April 2004
429	11	"Mind Wide Open"	Raymond Quint	Michaeley O'Brien	14 April 2004
430	12	"Reasonable Doubt"	Aarne Neeme	Tony Morphett	21 April 2004
431	13	"On the Inside"	Chris Adshead	Bill Garner	28 April 2004
432	14	"Secrets and Lies"	Jeffrey Walker	Ysabelle Dean	5 May 2004
433	15	"Yesterday's Hero"	Chris Langman	David Boutland	12 May 2004
434	16	"The Cull"	Kath Hayden	David Allen	19 May 2004
435	17	"Life of the Party – Part 1"	Chris Adshead	Ted Roberts	2 June 2004
436	18	"Life of the Party Part 2"	Steve Mann	Tony Morphett	9 June 2004
437	19	"The Family Way"	Chris Langman	Chris Corbett	16 June 2004
438	20	"Payback"	Fiona Banks	John Banas	23 June 2004
439	21	"Echoes"	Steve Mann	Maureen Sherlock	30 June 2004
440	22	"End of Innocence"	Chris Langman	Bill Garner	6 July 2004
441	23	"Headless Chooks"	Chris Adshead	Bill Roberts	14 July 2004
442	24	"A Time For Mourning"	Peter Sharp	Ysabelle Dean	21 July 2004
443	25	"Pigs Will Fly"	George Ogilvie	Deb Parsons	28 July 2004
444	26	"Life Goes On"	Grant Brown	Michael Brindley	4 August 2004
445	27	"Checkmate"	Chris Adshead	Alison Nisselle	11 August 2004
446	28	"Don't Call Me Baby"	Peter Sharp	John Banas	1 September 2004
447	29	"Bring It On"	Jeffrey Walker	Chris Corbett	8 September 2004
448	30	"Pillow Talk"	Grant Brown	Michaeley O'Brien	15 September 2004
449	31	"Out of Love"	Chris Langman	Tony Morphett	22 September 2004
450	32	"Turf War"	Peter Sharp	Tony Morphett; Bill Garner	29 September 2004
451	33	"Away Games"	Steve Mann	Jenny Lewis	6 October 2004
452	34	"Special Treatment"	Kath Hayden	Ted Roberts	13 October 2004
453	35	"Too Late To Say Sorry"	Chris Langman	Ysabelle Dean	20 October 2004
454	36	"One of the Boys"	Peter Sharp	Maureen Sherlock	27 October 2004
455	37	"A Helping Hand"	Roger Hodgman	Max Singer	3 November 2004
456	38	"Tit for Tat"	Steve Mann	John Banas	10 November 2004
457	39	"Crash Site"	George Ogilvie	Michaeley O'Brien	17 November 2004

=== Season 12 (2005) ===
No. overall	No. in season	Title	Directed by	Written by	Australian air date
458	1	"Vengeance"	Chris Langman	Elizabeth Coleman	2 February 2005
459	2	"Burden of Proof"	Peter Sharp	Tony Morphett	9 February 2005
460	3	"My Way"	Aarne Neeme	Bill Garner	16 February 2005
461	4	"The Walking Wounded"	Steve Mann	Chris Corbett	23 February 2005
462	5	"Chasing Smoke"	Martin Sacks	Ted Roberts	2 March 2005
463	6	"Everything a Girl Could Want"	Martin Sacks	Jenny Lewis	9 March 2005
464	7	"One Good Turn"	Grant Brown	John Banas	16 March 2005
465	8	"Sex Sells"	Peter Sharp	Peter Dick	30 March 2005
466	9	"One Sick Puppy"	Raymond Quint	John Lewis	6 April 2005
467	10	"Killing Time"	Chris Langman	Deb Parsons; Tony Morphett	13 April 2005
468	11	"Mirror Image"	Grant Brown	Deb Parsons; Tony Morphett	20 April 2005
469	12	"Blood and Bone"	George Ogilvie	Tony Morphett	27 April 2005
470	13	"Kicking Over the Traces"	Chris Langman	John Ridley; Stuart Page	4 May 2005
471	14	"Offside"	Aarne Neeme	Michael Brindley	11 May 2005
472	15	"The Life"	Steve Mann	Jeff Truman	18 May 2005
473	16	"The Ticket Out"	Chris Langman	Rohan Trollope and Tony Morphett	24 May 2005
474	17	"Playing by the Book"	Chris Adshead	Victoria Madden and John Banas	1 June 2005
475	18	"Monster"	Steve Mann	Chris Corbett	8 June 2005
476	19	"Dangerous Animals"	Fiona Banks	John Banas	15 June 2005
477	20	"Showdown"	Chris Adshead	Forrest Redlich	22 June 2005
478	21	"Car Wars"	Martin Sacks	Jo Kasch	29 June 2005
479	22	"Night & Day"	Steve Mann	Tony Morphett	6 July 2005
480	23	"The Party's Over"	Colin Budds	Bill Garner	20 July 2005
481	24	"Crossing the Line"	Roger Hodgman	Michaeley O'Brien	20 July 2005
482	25	"Warm Blood"	Richard Frankland	Ted Roberts	27 July 2005
483	26	"Another Day at the Office Part 1"	Peter Sharp	Jane Allen	3 August 2005
484	27	"Another Day at the Office Part 2"	George Ogilvie	Forrest Redlich	10 August 2005
485	28	"Last Orders"	Roger Hodgman	Chris Corbett	17 August 2005
486	29	"Getting the Bullet"	Chris Langman	John Banas	24 August 2005
487	30	"Acid Test"	Peter Sharp	Ysabelle Dean	31 August 2005
488	31	"One for the Road"	Steve Mann	Ted Roberts	7 September 2005
489	32	"Two Laws"	Grant Brown	Tony Morphett	14 September 2005
490	33	"Good Times"	Chris Langman	Bill Garner	21 September 2005
491	34	"Bad Fortune"	Fiona Banks	Michaeley O'Brien	28 September 2005
492	35	"Child's Play"	Steve Mann	Forrest Redlich	5 October 2005
493	36	"Facing the Music"	Grant Brown	Jeff Truman	12 October 2005
494	37	"Too Close"	Raymond Quint	James Dunbar and John Banas	19 October 2005
495	38	"Promises, Promises"	Peter Sharp	Jo Kasch	26 October 2005
496	39	"Slaying the Demons"	Aarne Neemer	John Banas	2 November 2005
497	40	"Keeping Up Appearances"	George Ogilvy	Ysabelle Dean	12 November 2005
498	41	"Face Value"	Peter Sharp	Tony Morphett	16 November 2005
499	42	"Lost & Found"	Ray Quint	Tony Morphett	16 November 2005

=== Season 13 (2006) ===
No. overall	No. in season	Title	Directed by	Written by	Australian air date
500	1	"Only the Lonely"	Fiona Banks	Bill Garner	1 April 2006
501	2	"Boss"	Chris Langman	Michaeley O'Brien	8 April 2006
502	3	"Dirt"	George Ogilvie	Stuart Page	15 April 2006
503	4	"What's Love Got to Do with It"	Peter Sharp	John Banas	22 April 2006
504	5	"Affluenza"	Chris Ashead	Kylie Needham; John Banas	29 April 2006
505	6	"Going Down Swinging"	Chris Langman	Samantha Winston	6 May 2006
506	7	"Burning Up"	George Ogilvie	Ysabelle Dean	13 May 2006
507	8	"Down to Earth"	Grant Brown	Ted Roberts; John Banas	20 May 2006
508	9	"Moonlighting"	Martin Sacks	Tony Morphett	27 May 2006
509	10	"One Day More – Part 1"	Fiona Banks	Stuart Page	4 June 2006
510	11	"One Day More – Part 2"	Peter Sharp	Tony Morphett	4 June 2006

== Blue Heelers specials ==
No. overall	No. in season	Title	Directed by	Written by	Original release date
1	1	"Blue Heelers: The Weakest Link"	Unknown	Unknown	9 August 2001
The Weakest Link, hosted by Cornelia Frances, aired a Blue Heelers special episode on 9 August 2001. Cast members John Wood, Neil Pigot, Ditch Davey, Jeremy Kewley, Jane Allsop, Suzi Dougherty, Paul Bishop, Caroline Craig and Peta Doodson took part in this special event.
2	2	"Countdown to Blue Heelers Live"	Unknown	Unknown	21 April 2004
This special hosted by Erik Thomson aired before the live episode "Reasonable Doubt". It featured interviews with cast members, John Wood, Julie Nihill, Martin Sacks, Ditch Davey, Simone McAullay, Jane Allsop.
3	3	"Reasonable Doubt – Blue Heelers Live"	Aarne Neeme	Tony Morphett	21 April 2004
The Heelers must deal with a child killer (Chris' nephew) who has been found not guilty by a jury. When he returns to Mt. Thomas and gets involved in a fight with a group of angry locals, Jonesy arrests him and clearly plans to mete out his own form of justice, in spite of opposition from his colleagues. With the mob out for blood, the acquitted man is sheltered at the station as an armed standoff erupts at the Imperial.

== Blue Heelers: Wheel of Fortune ==
No. overall	No. in season	Title	Directed by	Written by	Original release date
1	1	"Episode 01"	Unknown	Unknown	15 April 1996
It's "Real Cops" vs "Reel Cops" as members of Australia's Police Force take on the cast of Channel 7's "Blue Heelers" in a special series of Wheel of Fortune.
2	2	"Episode 02"	Unknown	Unknown	16 April 1996
It's "Real Cops" vs "Reel Cops" as members of Australia's Police Force take on the cast of Channel 7's "Blue Heelers" in a special series of Wheel of Fortune.
3	3	"Episode 03"	Unknown	Unknown	17 April 1996
It's "Real Cops" vs "Reel Cops" as members of Australia's Police Force take on the cast of Channel 7's "Blue Heelers" in a special series of Wheel of Fortune.
4	4	"Episode 04"	Unknown	Unknown	18 April 1996
It's "Real Cops" vs "Reel Cops" as members of Australia's Police Force take on the cast of Channel 7's "Blue Heelers" in a special series of Wheel of Fortune.
5	5	"Episode 05"	Glenn Woodcock	Unknown	19 April 1996
It's "Real Cops" vs "Reel Cops" as members of Australia's Police Force take on the cast of Channel 7's "Blue Heelers" in a special series of Wheel of Fortune.
