= Keith Faure =

Australian career criminal (born 1951)

- Keith George Faure, circa 1980s
- Born: Keith George Faure; June 1951 (age 75)
- Died: 2025
- Occupations: Painter and docker Slaughterman; Abalone sheller
- Parent: Noel Ambrose Faure
- Status: Imprisoned
- Convictions: Armed robbery x 4 Breaking and entering Manslaughter × 2 Murder × 2
- Penalty: Life imprisonment 19-year non-parole period

Keith George Faure (June, 1951 - July 2025), from Norlane, Victoria, Australia, is an Australian career criminal, convicted of multiple murders and manslaughters. He was serving life imprisonment with a minimum non-parole period of 19 years for his role in two murders related to the Melbourne gangland killings. Faure's criminal history includes further convictions for armed robbery and breaking and entering.

Faure and Chopper Read continued a lengthy prison war while imprisoned in Melbourne's Pentridge Prison during the 1970s and 1980s and Faure features prominently in Read's first few books. Faure was also the basis for the character of Keithy George in the film Chopper, who is stabbed to death in the film's opening scenes. Faure, portrayed by actor David Field, was reported to be unhappy with his portrayal and used his anger at his depiction in the film as a defence in a minor traffic offence. In the drama series Underbelly Faure is played by Kym Gyngell although as with several other characters his name is not mentioned in the series due to a court order.

== Criminal family ==
Faure's grandfather, Norman Bruhn, was reported to be a Sydney based gangster who operated during the 1920s. He was shot and killed in 1927 during a hit ordered by John Cutmore, who died with Squizzy Taylor in a Melbourne shoot-out four months later.

His brother, Leslie Faure, was serving a 14-year prison sentence for the murder of his girlfriend, killed in 1997. Faure's youngest brother, Noel Faure, was convicted of manslaughter for the 1990 killing of Frank Truscott of Rye, Victoria. Faure has been sent to trial for murder on five occasions and received two murder convictions.

== Criminal history ==
=== 1976 Clifton Hill ANZ Bank robbery ===
On 4 June 1976, Faure and two accomplices set out to rob the Clifton Hill branch of the ANZ Bank. Faure was convicted of shooting Senior Constable Michael Pratt in the back during the robbery. Pratt was later awarded the George Cross award for bravery, however he was forced to retire from the police force due to injuries sustained in the shooting by Faure. Faure was sentenced to four years' imprisonment for his role in the robbery and shooting of Pratt.

=== Manslaughter of Shane Rowland ===
Faure was found guilty of the manslaughter of Shane Dennis Rowland, who was shot dead on 1 May 1976 at a house in Richmond.

=== Manslaughter of Alan Sopulak ===
Faure was found guilty of the manslaughter of prisoner Alan Sopulak in 1976 at Pentridge prison. Sopulak died after he was stabbed nine times in the back with a sharpened butter knife.

=== Melbourne gangland killings ===
==== Murder of Lewis Caine ====
The body of Melbourne underworld figure, Lewis Caine (also known as Sean Vincent), was found dumped in a residential street in Brunswick on 8 May 2004. On 3 November 2005, Faure and Evangelos Goussis were convicted for the murder of Lewis Caine, the first murder convictions related to the Melbourne underworld wars.

==== Murder of Lewis Moran ====
On 31 March 2004 Lewis Moran and associate Herbert Wrout were shot while drinking at the Brunswick Club in Sydney Road, Brunswick. Faure was reportedly paid $150,000 by Tony Mokbel for the murder of Moran, of which $140,000 was collected. On 5 December 2005, during the committal hearing for the murder of Lewis Moran, Faure fainted in the dock and was attended to by paramedics after suffering a suspected stroke. Faure pleaded guilty to the murder of Moran. On 3 May 2006, Faure was sentenced to 24 years' imprisonment for the murder of Lewis Caine and life imprisonment with a non-parole period of 19 years for the murder of Lewis Moran. Faure also gave evidence against others in both of these murders in a deal with the prosecution in return for a reduced sentence.

== Summary of criminal convictions ==
Date	Conviction	Comments	Notes
February 1974	Armed robbery in company	Sentenced to 2 years 6 months' imprisonment.	
April 1974	Armed robbery in company	Sentenced to 4 years' imprisonment.	
February 1977	Manslaughter	Sentenced to 8 years' imprisonment.	
July 1977	Manslaughter	Sentenced to 9 years' imprisonment.	
November 1977	Armed robbery in company	Sentenced to 10 years' imprisonment.	
April 1989	Armed robbery	Sentenced to 13 years 6 months' imprisonment.	
13 May 2006	Murder	Sentenced to 24 years' imprisonment.	
13 May 2006	Murder	Sentenced to life imprisonment with a non-parole period of 19 years.	
