= Squizzy Taylor (disambiguation) =

Squizzy Taylor (1888–1927) was an Australian gangster.

Squizzy Taylor may also refer to:

- Squizzy Taylor (film), 1982 Australian film
- Lewis Taylor (Australian footballer) (born 1995), Australian rules footballer nicknamed "Squizzy"
