= Kim Lewis =

Australian actress

- Born: 5 September 1963 (age 62); Sydney, Australia
- Occupation: Actress
- Years active: 1977-
- Known for: The Restless Years, Sons and Daughters
- Spouse: John Howard
- Children: 1

Kim Lewis (born 5 September 1963 in Sydney, Australia) is a television, stage and film actress, best known for her roles in TV series including Julie Scott in The Restless Years and as Jill Taylor / O'Donnell in the television soap opera Sons and Daughters.

== Film and TV roles ==
Her first film role was as Ida Pender in Squizzy Taylor in 1981. Later television appearances include A Country Practice, Home and Away, All Saints and Packed to the Rafters.

She also acted on stage starting from 1986 until 2020, roles include The Heidi Chronicles

== Personal life ==
Lewis has one child with her husband and fellow Australian actor, John Howard.

She also helped produce the film Sweethearts.

== Filmography ==
=== Film ===
Year	Title	Role	Type
1982	Squizzy Taylor	Ida Pender	Feature film
1988	Party Line	Newscaster	Feature film
1997	Blackrock	Rhonda	Feature film
2000	Risk	Child's Mother	Film
2002	Down to the Wire	Beryl Gutter	Short film
2011	The Last Race	Alice Mitchell	Short film

=== Television ===
Year	Title	Role	Type
1979–1982	The Restless Years	Regular role: Julie Scott	TV series, 687 episodes
1982–1985	Sons and Daughters	Regular role: Jill Taylor/Jill O'Donnell	TV series, 542 episodes
1988	A Country Practice	Guest role: Jenny Wilson	TV series, 2 episodes "Personal Choice" Part 1&2
1989; 1992	G.P.	Guest role: Stacey Lucas	ABC TV series, 1 episode 1: "The Best Laid Plans"
1994; 1996	G.P.	Guest role: Karen Hatton	ABC TV series, 1 episode "Innocent Bystander"
1996	Home and Away	Recurring role: Debbie Salter	TV series, 3 episodes
1996	G.P.	Guest role: Major Jackie Parsons	ABC TV series, 1 episode "A Stiff Upper Lip"
1999; 2002	All Saints	Guest roles: Megan Costello	TV series, 1 episode "Shoot the Messenger"
1999	Close Contact	Michelle	TV movie
2000	Search For Treasure Island	Regular role: Sally Raymond	TV series Australia/Germany, 10 episodes
2002; 2004	All Saints	Guest role: Julia Renshaw	TV series, 1 episode "Shame"
2004	All Saints	Guest role: Naomi Capstone	TV series, 1 episode "Under the Skin"
2009	Packed to the Rafters	Guest role: Toni	TV series, 1 episode
2009; 2011	The Jesters	Guest roles: And Andy's Agent/Casting Agent	TV series, 2 episodes
2017	The Doctor Blake Mysteries	Guest role: Margaret Reddan	ABC TV series, 1 episode
2018	The Daily Edition	Guest – Herself with John Wood	TV series, 1 episode
2023	The Morning Show	Guest – Herself with 'Sons and Daughters' cast: Tom Richards & Daniel Roberts	TV series, 1 episode
