= Riding to Win =

1923 film

Riding to Win/Bound to Win
- Directed by: Eric Harrison
- Written by: Eric Harrison
- Produced by: Eric Harrison
- Starring: Squizzy Taylor; Ida Pender
- Production company: Eric Harrison Photoplays
- Release dates: 29 October 1923 (Sydney); 3 March 1925 (Brisbane)
- Running time: 4,500 feet (under an hour)
- Country: Australia
- Languages: Silent film English intertitles

Riding to Win is an Australian comedy drama silent film starring Australian gangster Squizzy Taylor and his girlfriend Ida Pender. Made in 1922 it was banned by the Victorian censor but obtained release in Sydney and Brisbane under the title Bound to Win.

It is considered a lost film.

== Plot ==
A heroic jockey (Taylor) saves his girlfriend (Pender), the daughter of a horse trainer, from a criminal gang determined to stop him from riding the race favourite to win in the Eclipse Steeplechase.

== Cast ==
- Squizzy Taylor

== Production ==
At the peak of Squizzy Taylor's fame, he was contacted by producer-director Eric Harrison who convinced Taylor and his then-girlfriend Pender to star in a sporting comedy drama which would exploit Taylor's experience as a jockey. Shooting took place in 1922 in Melbourne, with scenes shot at Caulfield and Moonee Valley. The working title was In Emergency Colours.

Harrison had worked for JC Williamson.

Taylor announced he had signed with American companies.

== Reception ==
The film was banned from public screening by Victorian censor on the basis it was "representing two persons who figured recently in Criminal Court proceedings". Everyones reported in 1922 that:

When Eric Harrison decided to exploit .Melbourne's elusive member of the underworld—“Squizzy” Taylor—the wiseheads declared that he would never be able to go through with it. Heeding not the words of wisdom, Eric took a chance with “in Emergency Colors” and had almost finished when the word came through that the Legislature had decided to forbid the screening of the film.In all probability the used celluloid will immediately be relegated to the scrap heap, which, after all, is said and done, seems to be a most appropriate place for it.

In April 1923 the censor insisted it be cut to 2,300 feet.

Eventually Harrison obtained a release for the movie under the title of Bound to Win in Sydney in 1923 and Brisbane in 1925. It is not known how well the film performed financially although a contemporary newspaper report claimed "large numbers of people visited" the Majestic Theatre to see the Brisbane premiere.

Taylor died in a gunfight in 1927.
