= Malcolm Thompson =

Malcolm Thompson may refer to:

- Malcolm Thompson (actor) (born 1949), British-born Australian actor
- Malcolm Thompson (footballer) (1946–2014), English footballer
- Malcolm Thompson (cricketer) (1913–1936), Australian cricketer
- Malcolm Thompson (Canadian football) (born 1995), Canadian football defensive back
