= Norman Bruhn =

Australian criminal

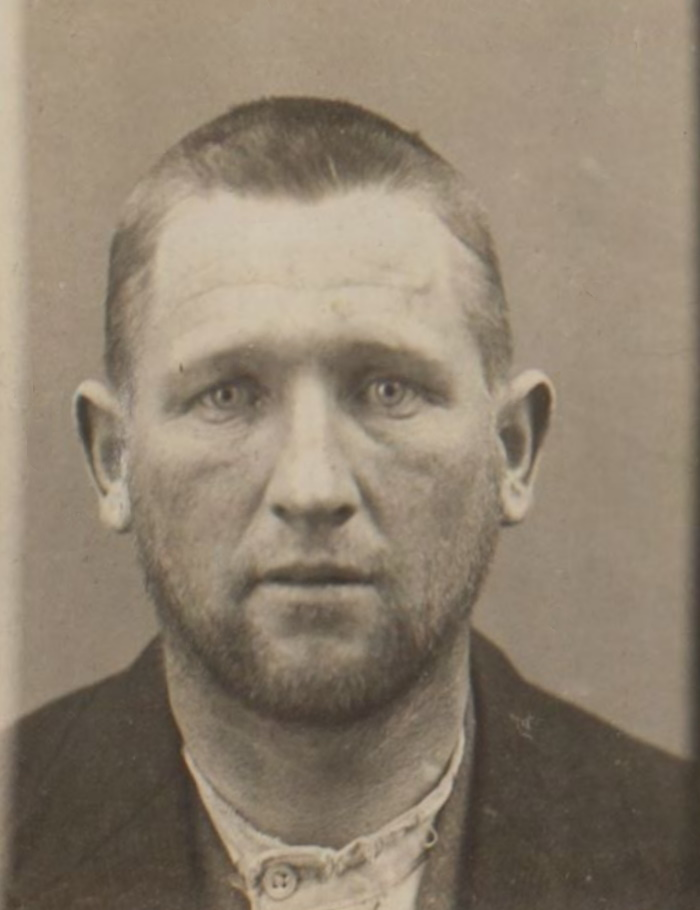
- Norman Bruhn in October 1921.
- Born: Norman Leslie Bruhn; 2 June 1894; Geelong, Victoria
- Died: 23 June 1927 (aged 33); Sydney
- Cause of death: Gunshot wounds to the abdomen
- Occupation: Criminal
- Parent(s): Oscar Johann Bruhn; Mary Anne Bruhn (née McFarlane)

Norman Bruhn (2 June 1894 – 23 June 1927) was a notorious and violent Australian dockworker, armed robber and standover man with links to the criminal underworld in both Melbourne and Sydney. In September 1926 Bruhn relocated with his family from Melbourne to Sydney, where he attained a brief ascendancy by targeting the underworld vice trade, using violence and intimidation against cocaine traffickers, prostitutes and thieves. Bruhn's criminal gang used the straight razor as a weapon of terror and are attributed as Australia's first 'razor gang', at the beginning of a period of gang violence in Sydney in the late-1920s known as the 'razor gang wars'. His period of domination of the inner-city vice economy was opposed by the more established criminal networks in Sydney. In June 1927 Bruhn was shot twice in the abdomen in an inner-city laneway in Darlinghurst. He died in Sydney Hospital the following morning, having refused to name his assailant.

Bruhn's life and times were portrayed in the television series on the Nine television network in Australia, Underbelly: Razor.

== Biography ==
=== Early life ===
Norman Leslie Bruhn was born on 2 June 1894 at Geelong, the fifth of ten children of Oscar Johann Bruhn and Mary Anne (née McFarlane). The father of the family, Oscar Bruhn, worked as a baker, employed since 1884 at John Little's Bakery in Moorabool-street, South Geelong. There is evidence that Norman and his siblings were raised in an atmosphere punctuated by occasional bouts of violence, exacerbated by his father's excessive drinking and short temper.

In June 1906 a notice was placed in the pages of the Geelong Advertiser by Norman's father, Oscar Bruhn of Fyans-street, South Geelong, directed to Edward Robinson of Geelong, apologising for an "unprovoked assault" committed upon him a week previously, and acknowledging "that it was absolutely without justification".

In May 1908 Norman Bruhn, aged 14 years, was admitted to the Geelong Hospital. He had been working in a local woollen mill when his arm was caught in a loom, causing a fracture and dislocation of the lower portion of the limb.

On 6 June 1908 Oscar Bruhn (senior) was officiating as a goal umpire at a football match between the Barwon and Chillwell Juniors teams at Kardinia Park in South Geelong. During the match the secretary of the Chillwell club, Albert Mattingley, was within the playing field near the goal posts and Bruhn claimed Mattingley was obstructing his view. He was asked to leave the ground, and when he refused, Bruhn tried to put him over the fence, but was unsuccessful. After the match, as Mattingley was picking up the goal flags, Bruhn struck him heavily on his back. In consequence Mattingley proceeded against Bruhn for assault. The Bench of magistrates fined the goal umpire ten shillings "for undertaking work not governed by the rules of football".

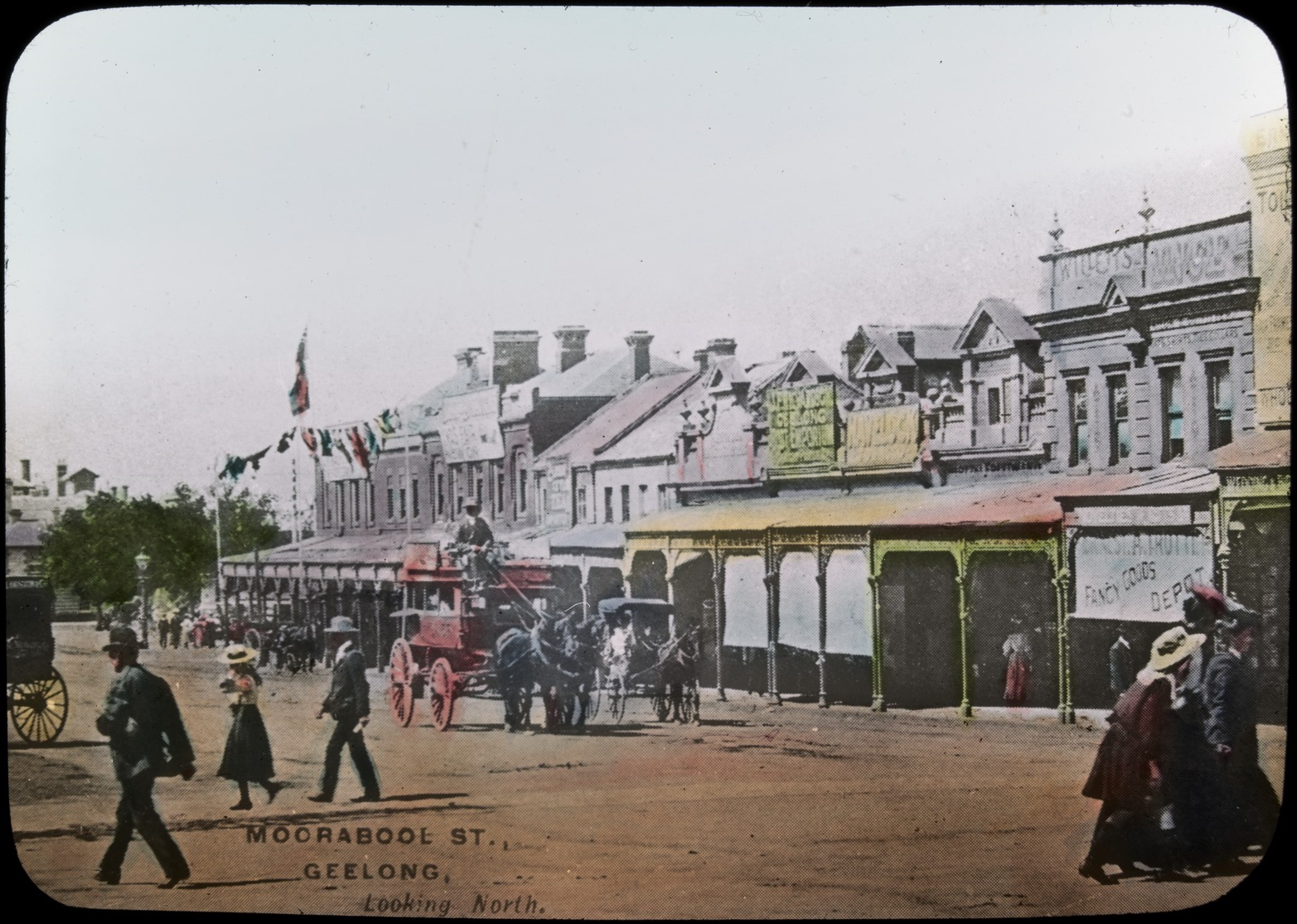
Moorabool-street, Geelong (hand-coloured glass lantern slide, approximately 1900).

In late May 1909 Oscar Bruhn was charged with unlawful assault after he threw his own son through a window at his residence in South Geelong. It was alleged that Bruhn arrived home in a violent mood. He initially threw a plate at his wife that missed. He then picked up his child by the legs, swung him around, and hurled the boy through a glass window and bamboo blind. The child landed in the street, in shock but with only a few scratches. At the Geelong West Police Court on 31 May 1918 Bruhn's legal representative stated that "the whole affair arose out of a family squabble" and that "the parties would adjust the matter themselves". The boy "said he had no desire to press the charge", so the police withdrew the charge and Bruhn was allowed to go free.

In November 1909 Oscar Bruhn (senior) was brought up on a charge of using insulting language at South Geelong. He was fined just one shilling after he signed "the pledge".

In November 1910 Norman Bruhn was one of five people fined ten shillings each for riding bicycles at night without lights.

In September 1911 Oscar Bruhn (senior) was arrested and charged with the indecent assault of 22-year-old Margaret Sudgell at Marshall-town, near Geelong. On the morning of 16 September Bruhn had called at several hotels before arriving at Bett's house at Marshall-town to buy eggs. It was alleged that he tried to assault Sudgell, who was employed by Mrs. Betts. Bruhn was tried in the Ballarat Supreme Court on 18 October. After hearing the evidence the jury returned a verdict of not guilty and the accused was discharged.

=== Larrikin activities ===
In July 1914 in the Geelong Police Court, Norman Bruhn was charged with offensive behaviour. Bruhn did not appear, but his legal representative pleaded guilty on his behalf, explaining that the defendant had received a position in a wool-shed and so was unable to attend court. The circumstances of the charge were detailed by Senior-constable Trainor, who stated that he and another constable were at the corner of Jacobs and Little Malop streets when "a party of youths… approached them and commenced boo-hooing and ran away". They repeated this behaviour on several occasions, with Bruhn identified by the policeman as the ring-leader of the larrikin 'push'. Bruhn was fined forty shillings (in default, 14 days' imprisonment).

In September 1914 the city of Bendigo held a railway picnic which attracted numerous visitors, many arriving on special trains from Melbourne. At about 6 p.m. at the corner of Hargreaves and Mitchell streets a number of young men "who had been imbibing too freely" started an argument "regarding the war". The argument led to punches being thrown. One of the men was knocked down, "his head striking the roadway with considerable force". Others joined in and a considerable crowd quickly gathered to witness the melee. Mounted Constable Dwyer arrived on the scene and caught one of the belligerents, Norman Bruhn, by the scruff of the neck and took him into custody. Bruhn was locked up and charged with offensive behaviour.

=== War record ===
Norman Bruhn enlisted in the Australian Imperial Force on 4 December 1914. He was initially placed in the 6th Battalion (transferred to the 46th Battalion in March 1916). Bruhn left Australia in February 1915, serving at Gallipoli and in France. His service record is scattered with frequent occurrences of drunkenness, absence without leave and desertion. He was court-martialled on two occasions (November 1916 and August 1917) and was treated in hospital for gonorrhoea a number of times. He was detained in prison and in hospital for various periods. When the war ended in November 1918 Bruhn was arrested and was treated for venereal disease. He escaped from custody and was absent without leave in France from March to October 1919. He was finally apprehended at Amiens and taken to London, where he was court-martialled for a third time and detained in custody. Bruhn left England aboard the Konigin Luise in December 1919, arriving at Melbourne in February 1920 and was discharged from the army, with the unexpired portion of his sentence remitted.

Norman Bruhn and 19-year-old waitress Irene Wyatt were married in May 1920 at St. Francis' Church in Melbourne. The couple had two children: Keith, born in April 1921 in Melbourne and Noel, born in 1924. After his discharge from the army Bruhn worked on the docks for a short time "before moving into a career in crime".

=== Criminal activities ===
On 26 July 1920 Bruhn was arrested and charged with having unlawfully assaulted Constable William Gleeson in the execution of his duties. Ten days previously Gleeson had been knocked down by two men during an attempted arrest. The constable fired his revolver at the men as the pair escaped. Bruhn was recognised and apprehended while police were inquiring into other matters at North Melbourne. His occupation was recorded as a woolworker.

On 21 December 1920 Edward Waterson, in company with his family, went to the Spencer Street Station to catch a train to Adelaide. As he approached the ticket window Waterson took two £5 notes from his pocket; as he did so, Stanley Bruhn, Norman's younger brother, stepped up, struck Waterson and took the notes from his hand. Waterson snatched back the notes and Bruhn then ran away. He was later found in the Inward Parcels Office, identified and arrested. At the time of the occurrence Norman Bruhn was found to have been standing nearby with some other men. He too was arrested and charged with loitering with the intent to commit a felony. Both Norman and Stanley Bruhn were remanded until 29 December, with bail fixed at £50.

On the night of 14 February 1921 the factory belonging to Elizabeth Goller in Guildford-lane (between Latrobe and Little Lonsdale streets in Melbourne) was robbed of serge and other dress materials worth £200. Norman Bruhn was suspected of the crime and his movements were kept under surveillance for several days. On 17 February it was decided to raid Bruhn's house in West Melbourne where two rolls of serge identified as being part of the stolen goods were found. Both Bruhn and his wife Irene were subsequently charged with the robbery in the City Watchhouse. Norman and Irene Bruhn were tried on the robbery charge before a jury and acquitted, after Irene had claimed "that a man had pushed the serge through the front window of her house and had not returned for it". In June 1921, however, the pair faced a magistrate in the City Court on the charge of having been in unlawful possession of the goods. On this occasion Bruhn was discharged, but Irene Bruhn was fined £5. The magistrate commented: "What often satisfies a jury would not satisfy a magistrate".

On the night of 28 June 1921 the blouse factory of the Marcelle Manufacturing Company in Guildford-lane was broken into and material worth about £230 was stolen. During the course of the robbery a man was seen by police "coming cautiously along the lane", and on seeing the police attempted to run away, but was arrested. A second man who was loitering in the neighbourhood also ran when he saw the police, but he too was apprehended. The two men were Norman Bruhn and Harold McDougall, a 30-year-old wharf labourer. Bruhn and McDougall were charged with loitering in a public place "with intent to commit a felony". Some of the stolen material was found near where the two men were arrested and stolen silk material was later found in McDougall's mother's house in West Melbourne. On 12 August the Bench of Magistrates discharged McDougall, but convicted Bruhn, who was sentenced to six months' imprisonment, to be suspended on a bond to be of good behaviour for three years. The next day McDougall was charged with breaking and entering the factory, but the charge ultimately failed and he was discharged.

On the night of 5 August 1921 Senior-Constable Kelly noticed Bruhn in a phaeton near O'Keefe's stables in O'Shanassy-street, North Melbourne, attempting to get a reluctant horse to go. When Kelly approached, Bruhn and two other men who were also present ran away. On investigation it was found that the set of harness on the horse had been stolen from O'Keefe's stables. In September 1921 Bruhn was charged in the City Court with having assaulted and robbed Thomas Hogan, a postal assistant, on the night of 10 September in Capel-street, West Melbourne. Hogan had been knocked down and robbed of a Stetson hat, a silver watch and chain and some coins. On 5 October 1921 at the Melbourne General Sessions Bruhn was tried on a receiving charge in relation to Hogan's hat and a larceny charge regarding the harness. He claimed mistaken identity, but the jury found him guilty on both charges. Bruhn was sentenced to prison terms of six months for larceny and a further three months for receiving. Bruhn was sent to Pentridge Prison. In March 1922 he was sentenced to a further six months incarceration for breaking his bond in regard to the 12 August loitering conviction.

=== A habitual criminal ===
On 11 January 1923 Bruhn was sentenced to a period of indeterminate reformatory imprisonment under the Indeterminate Sentences Act 1907 (Victoria). The Act allowed judges to impose an additional undefined period of confinement in a reformatory prison for those deemed to be an 'habitual criminal', "a class of offender who was considered either socially inadequate or highly motivated and contemptuous of the law".

On 11 March 1923 Bruhn's younger brother Stanley was observed in Geelong-road, Footscray, standing in a wagon "severely whipping" two horses "which were in poor condition". Six other men, including Norman Bruhn, were also present, all of them "very much under the influence of liquor". The witnesses saw one of the men on the back of a horse, kicking the animal with his heels. Another was striking the horse's head with the reins. By the time a policeman arrived one horse was lying on the ground exhausted (later destroyed) and the other was still in harness and "much distressed". In the Footscray Court on 19 March Stanley Bruhn faced a charge of "having used a horse in circumstances involving cruelty" and the other six men were charged with aiding and abetting his actions. Stanley and Norman Bruhn were each fined £10 plus costs.

Bruhn, recorded as a stevedore of West Brunswick, and two other men, George Donnellan and Edward O'Malley, were arrested after the Moreland Knitting Mills at West Coburg was broken into and robbed of clothing to the value of £68 in the early morning of 3 December 1925. The three men were seen in the vicinity soon after the robbery by a police bicycle patrol. The men threw bundles of clothes over garden fences and were running away when they were apprehended. Bruhn, Donnellan and O’Malley were committed for trial, with each man being released on bail of £100 with sureties. When the case was brought before the General Sessions on 3 March 1926 only O'Malley appeared. Warrants were issued for the arrest of Bruhn and Donnellan. O’Malley was able to provide an alibi for the time of the warehouse robbery and was acquitted of the charge. Bruhn was arrested on 17 April and remanded in gaol on a further charge of breaking into the warehouse of Wholesalers Ltd. in Little Collins-street and stealing a quantity of tobacco and cigars valued at £60. He was tried on 3 June at the General Sessions for the robbery at West Coburg. At the trial Bruhn claimed he was returning from a party and was simply talking to the two men when the police appeared and arrested him. The jury accepted his story and returned a verdict of not guilty. At the conclusion of the trial Bruhn complained that he was still being detained in prison for having broken his bond, to which the judge replied "that he was at liberty to make representations to the proper authorities".

By late 1926 Bruhn had an established reputation in the Melbourne criminal underworld as an armed robber and standover man, known as a skilled 'necklace man' (garrotter).

On 13 August 1926 a series of armed hold-ups were carried out in Melbourne, for which warrants were issued by police for the arrest of five men. The men named in the warrants were Norman Bruhn, Roy Bruhn, 'Wingey' Cameron, David Macfarlane (alias Woodlock) and 'Melbourne Darkie'. One of the armed robberies was that of Elizabeth Patrick at her home in South Yarra, from whom was stolen cash and diamond rings. Two "land salesmen", Walter Hammar of East Melbourne, and William Bruce of Collins-street Melbourne, were also robbed. In the case of the robbery of William Bruce, the gang entered his office in the mid-afternoon, locked the door and robbed him at gun-point. Before leaving they warned "they would deal with him" if he reported the robbery to the police. Other armed robberies carried out by Bruhn's gang were not reported, having been carried out on "members of the underworld, and on alleged gaming houses and sly-grog shops". Police believed the hold-ups were organised partly for the purpose of obtaining cash to bail out a man called Vince Christie. It was reported that detectives were "anxious to effect the arrest of the men as soon as possible, as they fear that a vendetta among the underworld may be brewing". Detectives visited the wanted men's haunts without success and believed the men had "gone into 'smoke'".

=== Move to Sydney ===
In September 1926, after a charge of shooting and wounding was laid against Bruhn in Melbourne, he breached his bail conditions and relocated to Sydney, taking his wife and young sons with him. The family travelled by coastal vessel to Sydney; Irene Bruhn later claimed they had sold their home in Melbourne, arriving in Sydney "with about £120 in our possession". The Victorian Police issued a warrant for Bruhn's arrest, though the case against him did not proceed. When the man he was alleged to have wounded in Melbourne refused "to be a party to any prosecution", the charge was withdrawn. In Sydney the Bruhn family rented a house in Park-road, Paddington; Bruhn joined the Wharf Labourers’ Union and began work on the wharves.

During the 1920s the urban character of Sydney underwent profound change, as it was transformed from a compact city into an expansive metropolis with decaying inner suburbs surrounded by an affluent suburban sprawl. The vice economy that developed in the inner-city slums and waterfront district was a reaction to successive conservative legislation in the decades following Federation, directed at imposing standards of personal behaviour. The New South Wales government had passed laws that sought to implement constraints on gambling, prostitution, and the sale of alcohol and narcotics. By the 1920s organised criminal syndicates began to emerge. Sly-grog establishments and SP bookmaking had a wide reach within the city, but prostitution and cocaine-trafficking was primarily restricted to inner suburbs such as Darlinghurst and Kings Cross.

=== The razor gang ===
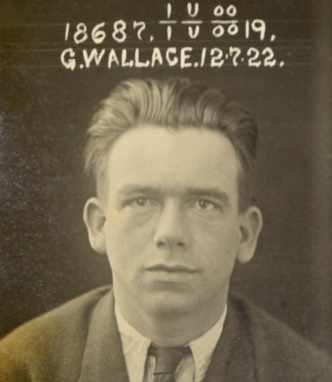
George 'The Midnight Raper' Wallace, photographed in July 1922.

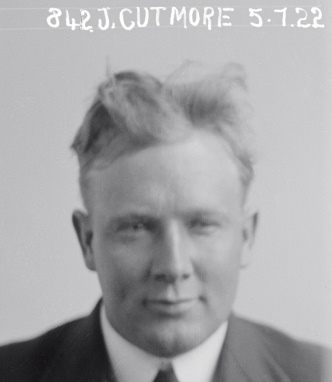
John 'Snowy' Cutmore, photographed in July 1922.

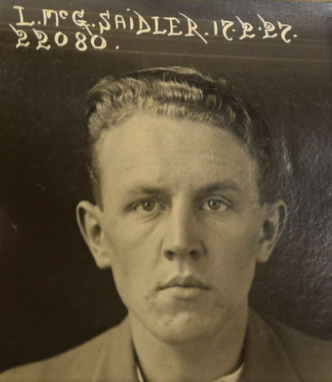
Lancelot 'Sailor the Slasher' Saidler, photographed in February 1927.

When he began working on Sydney's docks, Bruhn "established connections with the networks that smuggled or pillaged cocaine". Bruhn had "discovered in Sydney a new field for exploitation", an area of activity so lucrative "that several well-known Victorian criminals followed him to Sydney". Bruhn assembled a gang which included John 'Snowy' Cutmore, George 'The Midnight Raper' Wallace, Lancelot 'Sailor the Slasher' Saidler, and the albino standover man, 'Razor' Jack Hayes. In March 1927 the Pistol License Act became law, which required a license to carry or possess a pistol; anybody found with a concealable weapon without a license was subject to a fine of up to £100, with an addition of six months imprisonment if found to be carrying an unlicensed gun at night. As a consequence the weapon of choice of Bruhn's gang became the straight razor (often called the cut-throat razor), with a sharp blade that could be folded back into its handle and easily hidden from view. The group of criminals led by Bruhn in Sydney are attributed as Australia's first 'razor gang'.

The move to Sydney brought Bruhn and his gang into direct conflict with underworld figures such as Kate Leigh, Tilly Devine and Phil 'The Jew' Jeffs as they began to focus on disrupting the established cocaine business in Sydney. The first step in the cocaine supply chain were the seamen and dockworkers who smuggled the drug from the ships and out of the docks to the middlemen in the pubs or houses where it was stashed. Bruhn and his gang targeted the next step in the chain, the 'runners' who moved cocaine from the safe houses of the inner city suburbs to the distributors. Police estimated there were nearly five thousand "customers of the dope sellers" in the Darlinghurst and Potts Point districts. Bruhn also targeted his rivals' sly-grog shops and brothels by ransacking the premises, beating up customers and demanding 'standover' payments. The straight razor was used to threaten, intimidate and disfigure their opponents. Their victims were invariably those who wished to avoid the police, such as cocaine traffickers, thieves and prostitutes, who were attacked and threatened in laneways, brothels or in their own home. The gang members demanded money from their victims, who, if not forthcoming, were slashed about the face or body with a razor. When he gained his brief ascendancy in Sydney, Bruhn was counted among the underworld lovers of the coveted and notorious prostitute, Nellie Cameron.

In the autumn of 1927 the racehorse trainer and standover man, Sidney 'Siddy' Kelly, was slashed in the throat by 'Razor' Jack Hayes. After he recovered, Kelly and his older brother Tom encountered Hayes at Mack's, a sly-grog shop in Darlinghurst, and severely beat him. On the evening of 6 June 1927 Jack Hayes was shot by Tom Kelly, receiving a bullet wound in the chest which penetrated his lung. Hayes had been in Liverpool-street, Darlinghurst, when he later claimed he was shot from a passing car. However, Tom Kelly gave a different story, claiming that Hayes had jumped onto the running board of the car Kelly was in and, with a razor in his hand, said: "I’ll cut your ears off". Kelly said he warned Hayes to stay back, and when he failed to heed the warning, Kelly fired the shot. Hayes dropped to the road and was taken to St. Vincent's Hospital by men nearby. Kelly later surrendered to the police. Kelly was charged with shooting at Hayes "with intent to do grievous bodily harm", but the trial was delayed while Hayes recovered from his wound. When the trial was held at the Darlinghurst Sessions in August (less than two months after Bruhn had been killed), Kelly, pleading self-defence, was acquitted by the jury without hearing the case for the defence. During his evidence Hayes had been asked about his sobriquet, 'Razor Jack' (which he claimed to have become recently aware of). He was asked if he had ever slashed men with razors in company with Bruhn (which he denied). Hayes was also asked about a specific incident when it was alleged he cut a barrowman named Ellis in Oxford-street while the man was held by Bruhn. Ellis had been slashed by a razor extending from his ear to the back of his neck. This too, Hayes denied.

By June 1927 the Sydney tabloid newspapers were reporting that men with "slashed and sliced faces" were becoming "increasingly frequent visitors" to the inner-city hospitals. When questioned by the police the victims refused to name the perpetrator, fearing retribution if they allow "resentment to get the better of discretion". In recent months detectives had interviewed six people "who had refused the gang’s demands", all of whom claimed no knowledge of their attackers, though the police were certain "they had fallen victims to Bruhn's associates".

=== Death ===
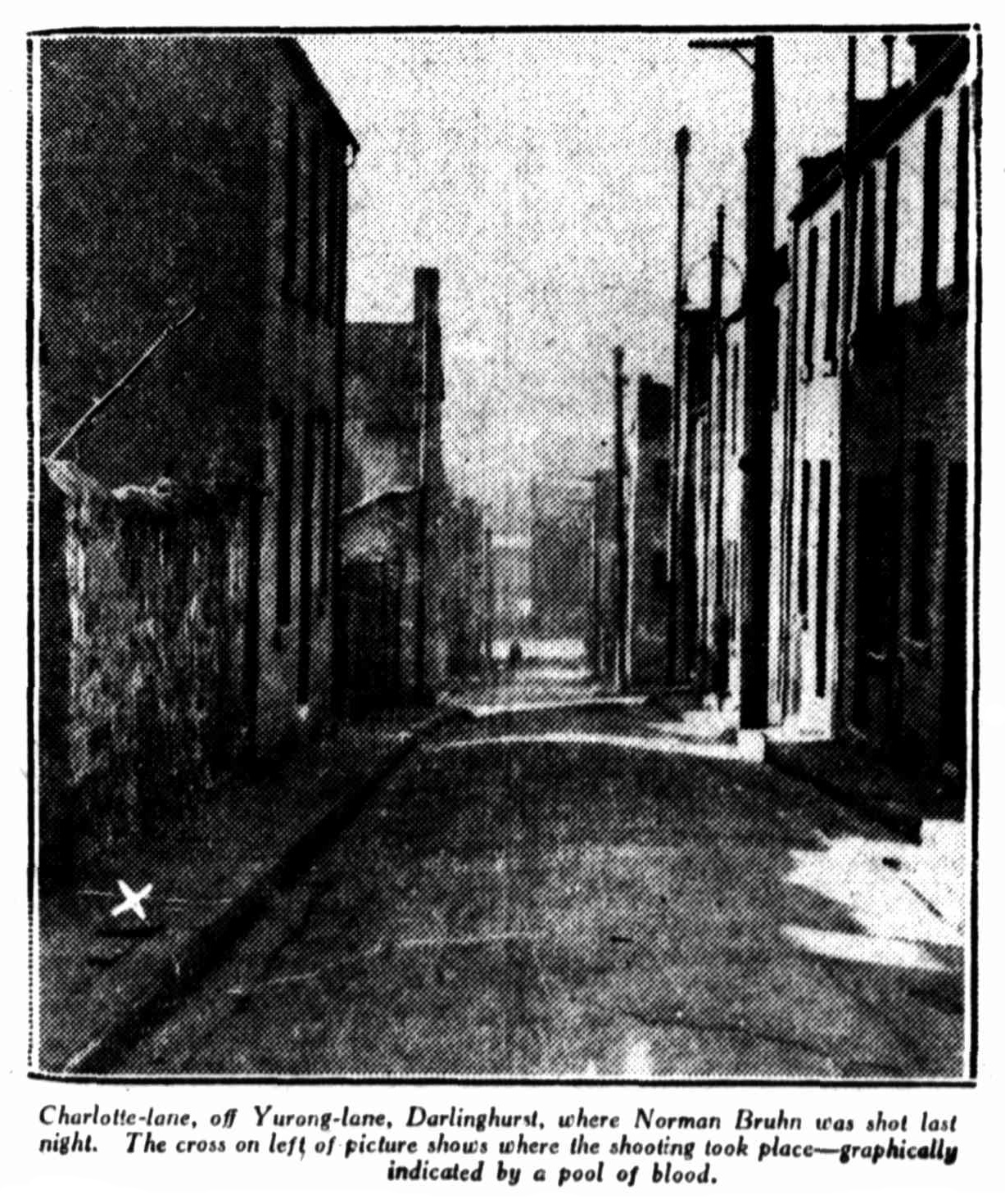
Charlotte-lane, Darlinghurst, where Norman Bruhn was shot (published in The Sun, 23 June 1927).

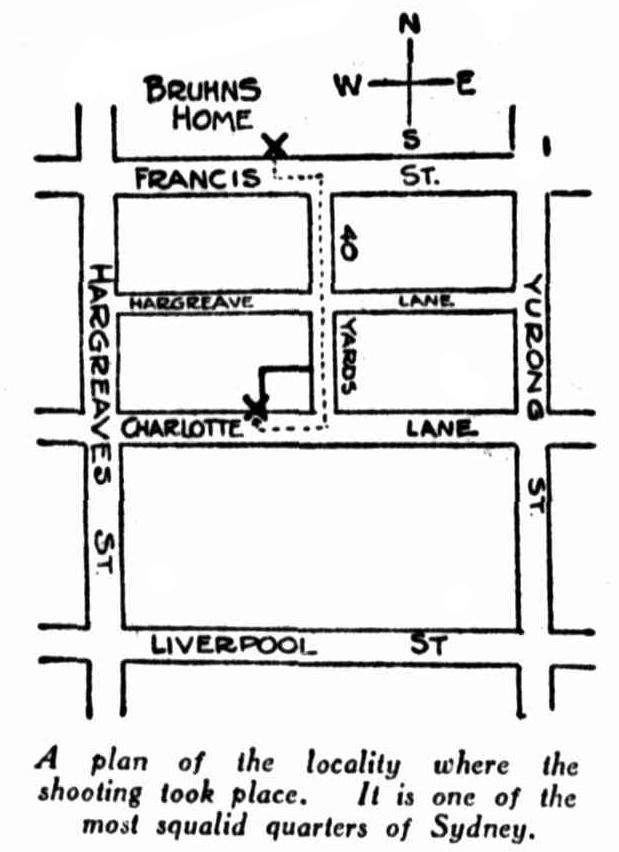
A map showing the location of the shooting and Bruhn's home, a short distance away.

By June 1927 Norman and Irene Bruhn and their two children were living in a flat in Francis-street (near the south-east corner of Hyde Park). Within a short period, Norman Bruhn and his criminal associates had disrupted the vice economy of Sydney's inner suburbs by focussing on extracting money from the cocaine traffickers by violence, or the threat of violence. However, the established criminal enterprises in Sydney had begun to fight back, making "common cause" against the attacks. Fights and counterattacks were increasingly carried out in the feud between the rival underworld gangs.

On Wednesday night, 22 June 1927, Norman Bruhn and three other men engaged a taxi-driver near Paddington Post-office. At their request the driver, Noel Infield, took them to Charlotte-lane in Darlinghurst, close to the south-east corner of Hyde Park, and was told to wait. At about ten o'clock the four men entered Mack's, a house at 22 Hargrave-street (on the corner with Charlotte-lane) owned by Joe McNamara and his brother which they operated as a sly-grog shop. Bruhn's companions were Robert Miller, a man named Hassett and another man. McNamara later gave evidence that he knew the third man as 'Snowy' (possibly 'Snowy' Cutmore). After remaining on the premises for about fifteen minutes, Bruhn's group left Mack's. On leaving the house Bruhn and his companions were approached by two men in Charlotte-lane. As they pushed past Miller, one of them said to him, "You get out of this, you’re not in it". One of the men then drew a revolver and shot Bruhn multiple times at close range. Five shots were fired, of which three hit their target. Bruhn slumped to the laneway, two .32 calibre bullet wounds in his abdomen and another which grazed his chest in two places. Constable Blench, who was walking along nearby Yurong-street, heard the five shots at about 10.30 pm, fired in quick succession. He ran into Charlotte-lane and saw Bruhn lying in a pool of blood, with Miller bending over him. Blench also saw two men running from the scene. Bruhn was put into Infield's taxi and taken to Sydney Hospital. At the hospital Constable Blench later reported that Miller remarked to him, regarding Bruhn's shooting, "It’s the coldest thing I’ve seen". When Bruhn was admitted to hospital, he was suffering severely from shock as a result of his wounds.

The proprietor of Mack's, Joe McNamara, walked to Francis-street and told Irene Bruhn of her husband's shooting. McNamara accompanied Mrs. Bruhn to the hospital in a car, during which she speculated about who had shot her husband. At one point she said: "I suppose that's Kelly again. You know – the one that done in the other fellow – the one that fixed 'The Ripper'" (a reference to Jack Hayes).

The bail magistrate, Mr. Hardwick, arrived at the hospital to interrogate the dying man, but Bruhn refused to give any information, claiming he did not know the name of his assailant. Although fully conscious, Bruhn repeatedly refused to give any information about the man who shot him. Bruhn died at 5.50 a.m. in Sydney Hospital on the morning after the shooting, aged 33 years.

Bruhn's brothers, Stanley and William, arrived in Sydney by motor car on 24 June to attend his burial. Norman Bruhn was buried in the Anglican section of Rookwood Cemetery on 25 June in the presence of his widow and two brothers. The coffin had been conveyed to the cemetery by train and it was estimated that 50 to 60 people were present at the graveside.

=== Investigation and coronial inquest ===
On 29 June, a week after Bruhn's death, Noel Infield, the taxi-driver on the night of Bruhn's shooting, attended an identification parade at the Darlinghurst Police Station, at which "several men were lined up for him". Infield was only able to identify Robert Miller, Bruhn's companion on the night. The next day a man approached Infield as he was waiting for a fare (described by the taxi-driver as "fair, with side-levers"). The man said: "Just as well you did not recognise anyone at the line-up"; he then added, "There will be another one tomorrow; be equally careful, or you will find yourself in hot water". At the line-up on the following day, Infield was again only able to identify Miller. Four men who had been placed in the two identification line-ups, who police suspected were involved in the shooting, were the brothers Tom and 'Siddy' Kelly, and Frank Green and George Gaffney. In light of the recent antagonism leading to the wounding of Jack Hayes, the selection of the Kelly brothers as suspects was obvious. Frank Green, known as 'The Little Gunman' because of his short stature, worked as a standover man and enforcer for Tilly Devine. George 'Gunman' Gaffney, on the other hand, worked for Tilly Devine's rival, Kate Leigh.

An inquest concerning the death of Norman Bruhn by the City Coroner was opened on 25 July. Robert Miller, Bruhn's companion on the night of the shooting, gave evidence but claimed to be "stupid drunk" and had no memory of the event, nor could he recall making a signed statement to police. On the second day of the inquest, held on 3 August, one of those who gave evidence was James Hassett, a "professional punter", who admitted to meeting Bruhn in Paddington earlier that afternoon but denied he had accompanied Bruhn and Miller to McNamara's house in Darlinghurst. At the conclusion of the inquest the coroner found that "Bruhn had been feloniously and maliciously murdered by some person unknown".

In August 1927 a reward of £200 was offered by the New South Wales Government for information leading to the apprehension and conviction of the person or persons responsible for Bruhn's death. In addition to the reward, the Government offered to extend a pardon to any accomplice who may provide such information. The reward was to remain in force for only three months.

=== Aftermath ===
In late October 1927 Bruhn's ally, 'Snowy' Cutmore, left Sydney for his hometown of Melbourne. On the evening of 27 October 1927 Cutmore died in a shoot-out with his underworld rival 'Squizzy' Taylor. Taylor and two other men had arrived at Cutmore's mother's house in Carlton, where Cutmore lay ill in bed. Taylor and one of his companions entered the bedroom where a desperate gun-fight occurred, resulting in the death of Cutmore and the fatal wounding of Taylor.

In the wake of the Carlton revolver duel and the deaths of 'Snowy' Cutmore and 'Squizzy' Taylor, police investigations determined that Taylor had been seen on the day of the shoot-out in the company of two underworld figures from Sydney, namely Tom Kelly and his younger brother 'Siddy' (both of whom had been among the suspects in Norman Bruhn's murder). On 29 October the Kelly brothers and a third man, Norman Smith, were intercepted by police at Seymour as they were travelling back to Sydney by motor car. The three were arrested, returned to Melbourne and charged with vagrancy. The Kelly brothers and Smith were remanded in custody while police continued their enquiries, but were released on 15 November when the police withdrew the vagrancy charges and admitted that their investigations "cannot go any further".

== A criminal family legacy ==
After his death Norman Bruhn's criminal legacy continued among his descendants through several generations. After her husband's death Irene Bruhn had a long-term relationship with Leslie Faure and her children, Keith and Noel, took the Faure name. Leslie Faure died on 9 April 1937 in Melbourne.

In October 1943, while enlisted in the Army as a private and stationed at Cowra, the older brother Keith Norman Faure was refused a meal at the Garden of Roses café because of the lateness of the hour, to which he responded by knocking a tray from the proprietor's hands and kicking him in the stomach, assaulting an officer and smashing three plate-glass windows and the glass door. Faure was sentenced to six months' imprisonment and ordered to pay compensation.

In 1942, aged eighteen, the younger brother Noel Ambrose Faure was convicted on two charges of housebreaking and stealing. Faure was a labourer in the shipbuilding and ship-repair industry, and a member of the Painters and Dockers Union, but also continued a criminal career. Faure was a talented safe-cracker. He married in 1950 and had three children. In later life Faure abandoned his criminal pursuits and worked as a slaughterman in a Footscray meatworks. He died in 1999. Faure's three sons were notorious criminals:

- Keith George Faure was born in June 1951. In June 1976 Faure, his cousin Norman Leslie Faure and another man robbed the Clifton Hill branch of the ANZ Bank, during which Faure shot the off-duty policeman Constable Michael Pratt in the back, for which he was convicted and sentenced to four years' imprisonment. Faure was a career criminal, convicted of multiple murders and manslaughters, including the murders of underworld figures, Lewis Caine and Lewis Moran during the Melbourne gangland killings of the late 1990s and early 2000s.
- Leslie Peter Faure was sentenced to a 14-year prison sentence for the murder of his girlfriend in August 1997 at Dromana, Victoria. Faure claimed the death occurred during a drunken game of Russian roulette.
- Noel William Faure was born in November 1954. He became a master butcher and a plasterer. He served gaol terms for manslaughter, firearms offences and driving charges. On 31 March 2004 Noel Faure, his older brother Keith and Evangelos Goussis murdered Lewis Moran and wounded Herbert Wrout at the Brunswick Club Hotel. The Faure brothers and Goussis were paid $150,000 for the underworld 'hit'. At his sentencing for the crime the judge noted that Faure had operated as a gun for hire; he was not involved in the gangland war and had no grievance with his victims. He died in prison on 30 December 2016 at Hopkins Correctional Centre, Ararat, Victoria, aged 62 years after a seven-year illness.
