= Nellie Cameron =

Australian prostitute

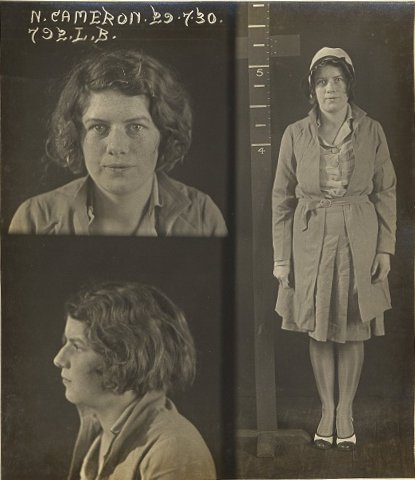
- Nellie Cameron in 1930
- Born: Ellen Katherine Kelly; 1910; Waterloo, New South Wales, Australia
- Died: 8 November 1953 (aged 42); Darlinghurst, New South Wales, Australia
- Burial place: Eastern Suburbs Memorial Park
- Other name: "The Kiss of Death Girl"
- Occupation: Prostitute
- Known for: Crime Figure
- Spouse: Charlie Bourke
- Children: 1

Nellie Cameron (born Ellen Katherine Kelly; 1910 – 8 November 1953), known as "The Kiss of Death Girl", was a notorious Sydney prostitute in the 1920s and 1930s, who was featured extensively in the 2011 Australian television mini-series Underbelly: Razor. Cameron was associated with the cocaine-fuelled ravages of the razor gang violence of that era, commonly associated with her contemporaries Tilly Devine and Kate Leigh, both criminal entrepreneurs who controlled much of Sydney's illegal sex industry and Sly-grog distribution during that period. Nellie Cameron received 73 criminal convictions during her life of crime, mainly for soliciting and vagrancy, and had the distinction of becoming the first woman in Australia to be convicted of consorting with criminals.

== Early life ==
Ellen (Nellie) Katherine Kelly was born in the inner city Sydney suburb of Waterloo in 1910, the youngest child of Colin Kelly, who later served in the AIF in World War I, and Lillian Kelly (née Ruddock). The Kellys also had two sons, Lionel, born in 1907, but died soon afterwards, and William Colin, who was born in 1908, but died a toddler of cerebral meningitis on 5 December 1910 in Bulli Cottage Hospital, NSW. Colin Kelly was later divorced by his wife, Lillian Kelly, on the grounds of desertion.

After Nellie's mother married Robert George Cameron in 1922, Nellie took her stepfather's surname for most of her adult life. Cameron was a Roman Catholic and was educated at an exclusive girls' school on the North Shore.

In 1926 Cameron ran away from home, caught a train to the city, seduced a married tram driver, and began living with him in Woolloomooloo.

== "The Kiss of Death Girl" ==
When Cameron began her career in prostitution in 1926 in Sydney's Surry Hills and Woolloomooloo districts at the age of fifteen, she was a blue-eyed blonde. Soon Cameron became Sydney's most popular and most expensive prostitute and was known as Sydney's Underworld Beauty Queen and also as the "Kiss of Death Girl" or "The Angel of Death", as most of her boyfriends or husbands were subsequently murdered. During her years in crime, Cameron was kidnapped, beaten, stabbed, razor slashed, and shot on numerous occasions.

Early in 1927 when Cameron met Norman Bruhn (1894–1927), a Melbourne-born dockworker and gunman, thief, standover man and pimp feared for his garroting skills, who was forced to leave Melbourne by rival gunman Squizzy Taylor in November 1926, she was described as "a redhead with a ripe figure and provocative china blue eyes". At that time Cameron was a street prostitute on William and Palmer Streets with no connection to Tilly Devine or any other madam. Despite having a wife and children, Bruhn soon became Cameron's lover and pimp, although she also worked as a dance instructor at Professor Bolot's Academy in Sydney's Oxford Street, commuting between Sydney and Queensland on a regular basis. According to Larry Writer, Cameron "perfected the age-old game called 'gingering' in Australia. During sex with one of her clients, an accomplice would emerge from beneath the bed and take the client's wallet from his pants or jacket. At that point, coitus would be interrupted by angry banging on the door by another involved in the scam, Cameron, feigning panic, would exclaim it was the police or her irate husband, and urge the client to dress and depart by the back door. Keen to avoid the embarrassment of public prosecution or a beating, the customer would flee and usually not notice until later that his wallet was missing." Cameron also was a cocaine runner and a fence for stolen property. Bruhn, who attempted to dominate the duopolised gangland milieu, was shot twice in the stomach outside a sly grog den in Charlotte Lane, Darlinghurst, on 22 June 1927 by a hit squad sent by either Devine or Kate Leigh, and subsequently died in the early hours of 23 June 1927.

Within weeks of Bruhn's death, Cameron began a series of relationships with a successive string of other Sydney criminals: Ernest Lyle Connelly (1903–1969), shot in Womerah Avenue, Kings Cross by rival gunman and future husband, Guido Caletti (or Calletti) in February 1929; New Zealand–born housebreaker and standover man Alan Edward (Ted) Pulley, later shot dead by illegal bookmaker Florrie Riley at Wentworth Street, Glebe on 6 March 1937; and Francis Donald (Frank) Green, (1902–1956), Caletti's rival for Cameron's affections.

On 16 June 1931 Cameron, Green, and William Hourigan visited the Maroubra home of James Edward "Big Jim" Devine that he shared with his wife, Tilly Devine. After an altercation, Devine shot at the fleeing Cameron, Green, and Hourigan, and accidentally killed a taxi driver. Subsequently, on 11 July 1931 Green, Horigan and Cameron were charged with "robbery under arms", being accused of having assaulted Devine, while armed with a revolver, and robbing him of a diamond tiepin valued at £50. On 16 September the charges against Cameron and Hourigan were dismissed due to lack of evidence.

On 16 November 1931, after visiting her then de facto husband Frank Green at St. Vincent's Hospital where he was in a serious condition after being shot in the stomach, Nellie Cameron was herself shot in the shoulder in Burton Street, East Sydney, while walking home from the hospital. Later, she refused to cooperate with police.

Cameron's first marriage was to the feared Sydney gangland figure Guido Caletti (1900–1939), who was the leader of a vicious Sydney gang known as the "Darlinghurst Push". The couple had fled New South Wales to Victoria due to outstanding arrest warrants. They married at the local registry office at Fitzroy, Victoria, on 20 February 1934 with Nellie using her birth name, Ellen Kelly. In November 1934 Caletti was imprisoned for two years, and Cameron renewed her relationship with Frank Green.

In July 1937 Cameron was charged with maliciously shooting at Harry Roper the previous month.

While Cameron was working as a prostitute in Queensland, Cameron's husband Guido Caletti was shot dead allegedly by two rival gunmen, Robert Branch and George Allan, at a party in Brougham Street, East Sydney, on 6 August 1939.

In 1940 Cameron married Charles Francis "Greyhound" Bourke (1909–1964) (also known as Edward Brown and MacRogers), another notorious Sydney criminal and gunman, at Sydney, using her then married name of Ellen Catherine Caletti. The couple separated a few years later, although she retained the surname of Bourke until her death in 1953.

About 1947 Cameron adopted Janice, the infant daughter of a neighbour, and raised her conscientiously.

== Later years and death ==
During 1951 Cameron began living with William Francis Donohue (born about 1922), a wharf labourer, at 17 Denham Street, Taylor Square. On 31 March 1952, Cameron was attacked at her flat by Donohue, who shot her in the stomach. Cameron was admitted to St Vincent's Hospital in a critical condition with a bullet lodged in her liver. Despite Bourke surrendering himself to police and informing them of the shooting, at trial Nellie would not give evidence against him and the case collapsed. Upon surgery to remove the bullets, it was found that Cameron had several healed bullet wounds in her body, possibly sustained from the attack in 1931. However, some of them had become sites for cancerous growths and they had become inoperable.

After severe illness and suffering from depression, Nellie Cameron committed suicide through gas asphyxiation at her Taylor Square flat on 8 November 1953.

Nellie was buried as Ellen Katherine Bourke on 10 November 1953 in the Botany Roman Catholic Cemetery, now known as Eastern Suburbs Memorial Park. Over 700 mourners attended her funeral including Kate Leigh, Tilly Devine and ex lover Frank Green. She was survived by her estranged husband Charlie Bourke, her mother, Mrs Lillian Cameron and her adopted daughter, Janice.
