= The Restless Years =

Australian soap opera (1977–1981)

- Genre: Soap opera
- Created by: Reg Watson
- Country of origin: Australia
- Original language: English
- No. of seasons: 4
- No. of episodes: 780

Production
- Producer: Don Battye (later years)
- Running time: 25 minutes
- Production company: Reg Grundy Organisation

Original release
- Network: Ten Network
- Release: 6 December 1977 – 12 November 1981

The Restless Years is an Australian soap opera which followed the lives of several Sydney school-leavers and the drama and relationships faced by young adults. It was created by Reg Watson and produced by the Reg Grundy Organisation for Network Ten, and ran from 6 December 1977 until 12 November 1981.

== Storylines ==
The series made use of dramatic storylines involving murders, kidnapping, suicides, amnesia, serial killers, blackmail, divorce, and prostitution among the more standard elements such as teenage problems, unemployment, romance, jealousy, money-making schemes, and parental problems.

The show's younger characters were seen living in various share households. Their storylines frequently involved romances, attempts to find a job, career problems. There were some family groups where the parents endured marital infidelity, divorce, problems with their children.

Dr Bruce Russell's first wife, Alison (Julieanne Newbould), suffered a miscarriage and was soon afterwards killed by terrorists while on holiday in Asia. Bruce later married Olivia Baxter. She fell pregnant but there were complications. Bruce arranged for her to have an abortion as the pregnancy could harm her health. After this she became mentally deranged and divorced him. Olivia subsequently snatched a baby and went on the run.

The Restless Years, unlike previous series, did not focus on a physical locale, although presented a loose set of relationships where frequent phone calls defined the facilitated links, and frequently occur in the various foyers of the apartment building where the characters resided. Although various scenes were featured at a local bar called "Thommo's", a much frequented cafe, and subsequently a youth refuge and a cafe called the "Beck and Call", the series although filmed in the in-house studios, including shopping centres, parks, gardens and the beach. The physical relationships from the various residences were not clearly defined, and the established logic was restricted to a subset of regulars.

== Cast ==
There was a high turnover of attractive youngsters in the cast, who made up the students of school graduates, including Olivia Baxter, played by Zoe Bertram, and rebellious youth Peter Beckett, played by Nick Hedstrom, however the series' most enduring character would be Dr. Bruce Russell, played by 28 year-old English-born Number 96 star Malcolm Thompson who before settling in Australia had previously spent a 10-month stint featuring in British TV soap opera Coronation Street.

The series made use of established actors to provide the backbone, including former school teacher and dignified middle-aged spinster Miss Elizabeth McKenzie, played by veteran actress June Salter, who would emerge as the heart of the series.

Original cast members Salter and Hedstrom left the series in late 1980 and Bertram left in late 1981, leaving Thompson as the only remaining original cast member, and the only cast member to continue through the show's entire run. Salter and Hedstrom returned for the final episode.

Actor	Role	Ref
June Salter	Miss Elizabeth McKenzie	
Malcolm Thompson	Dr. Bruce Russell	
Deborah Coulls/Sue Smithers	Penny Russell	
Nick Hedstrom	Peter Beckett	
Sonny Blake	Alan Archer	
Julieanne Newbould	Alison Clarke	
Graham Thorburn	Barry King	
Stanley Walsh	Clive Archer	
Tina Grenville	Louise Archer	
Lynette Curran	Jean Hutton (later Stafford)	
John Benton	Mr. Richard Dawson (school teacher)	
Zoe Bertram	Olivia Baxter	
Noel Trevarthen	Jeff Archer	
Peggy Thompson	Carol Archer	
Michael C. Smith	Shane Archer	
John Hamblin	A.R. Jordan	
Richard Gilbert	Mervyn Baggott	
Sharon Higgins	Nancy James	
Jill Forster	Heather Russell	
Bruce Barry	Miles Dunstan	
Ivar Kants	Ken Garrett	
Victoria Nicolls	Raelene Geddes (later Archer)	
Diane Craig	Gail Lawrence	
Lenore Smith	Diane Archer	
Tom Burlinson	Mickey Pratt	
Jamie Glesson	Tim Watson	
Vince Martin	Craig Garside	
Benita Collings	Clare Moran	
Joy Chambers	Rita Merrick	
Penny Cook	Susie Denning	
Anna Hruby	Sally Kennedy	
Martin Sacks	Adam Lee	
Lisa Crittenden	Briony Thompson	
Jacqui Gordon		
Peter Phelps	Kevin Ryan	
Kim Lewis	Julie Scott	
Kerri-Anne Kennerley	Melinda Burgess	
David Argue	Sammy Martin	

== Production ==
The series was Grundy's third foray into creating successful soap operas, and followed a similar theme to their previous school room drama Class of '74. The Restless Years also holds the distinction, with a handful of other Grundy serials, of having never been broadcast, or been remade, in the United Kingdom.

=== Theme tune ===
The opening and closing theme title sequence was played over a melancholy piano tune, over a shot of rolling clouds while an angelic chorus would intone, It's only a journey, through our restless years, let our hearts run free....

The rather maudlin tune and refrain set a pensive and sad tone.

In a promotional move, the network had singer Renee Geyer, record a funky rock ballad based on the theme tune, and it was used as the Ten Network's identification mark.

== Broadcast ==
The series debuted in a prime time slot on 6 December 1977 (during the end-of-year TV non-ratings period, in the vein of the Seven Network serial Cop Shop, which had premiered the previous week in the out of ratings period) and was creator Watson's second successful soap opera in Australia, following The Young Doctors.

It had a successful run of four years, until December 1981, and ran 781 x 30 minute episodes. It was not renewed by the network due to declining ratings. The series had a predominantly young audience.

The Restless Years originally screened in most areas at 7.30 pm in one-hour instalments, twice a week on Tuesdays and Thursdays. For all but the last three weeks of its 1981 season, the series screened in Melbourne as five thirty-minute episodes stripped across each weeknight at 7.00 pm. It was moved to 5.30 pm for the last three weeks, with final episode reached on Thursday, 12 November 1981. In Sydney in mid 1981 the series switched to running as a single one-hour episode on Wednesday nights at 7.30 pm.

== Famous alumni ==
There was a high turnover of young performers in the series. It was a training ground for many stars including Peter Mochrie in his debut as Ric Moran. He would go on to appear in film Winter of Our Dreams starring Bryan Brown and Judy Davis.

Others included Tom Burlinson (The Man From Snowy River), Penny Cook (A Country Practice and E Street), Anna Hruby, Martin Sacks (Blue Heelers), Lenore Smith (The Flying Doctors), Joanne Stanley, Lisa Crittenden (Sons and Daughters, Prisoner) and Jacqui Gordon, while Peter Phelps and Kim Lewis would also find fame on Sons and Daughters.

Jon (Sonny) Blake played Alan Archer in the series. He starred in a number of films after leaving The Restless Years, including The Anzacs, Freedom, amongst others, and the 1986 film, The Light Horsemen, in which he was dubbed the next Mel Gibson. Tragically, he was severely injured on the last day of filming in a car accident. He sustained permanent brain damage ending a promising career. He died in 2011.

== Remakes ==
The show was remade in the Netherlands as Goede tijden, slechte tijden (first broadcast 1990) which in turn was remade in Germany as Gute Zeiten, schlechte Zeiten (since 1992): both these titles mean "Good times, bad times". As of 2021, the Dutch and German shows are still running – although they have long since diverged from the original Australian storylines – and are the highest rated soap operas in their respective countries. Apart from the similar title, the shows are currently also very different from each other with unique characters and very different plotlines.

== See also ==
- List of Australian television series
