= Malcolm Thompson (actor) =

Australian actor

- Born: Yorkshire, England, United Kingdom
- Occupations: Actor, hotelier
- Known for: Number 96, The Restless Years

Malcolm Thompson is a British-born former actor. He was active in both his native England and in Australia, where he is best known for his role in 1970's soap operas The Restless Years and Number 96.

== Early life and career in England ==
Thompson was born in Yorkshire, England and began acting in England in weekly-repertory and other theatre companies, including The Bristol Old Vic, The Mermaid Theatre and London's West End.

Television and film work included educational programmes made for schools, and a stint in the soap opera Coronation Street, playing a young roughneck named Thomo for ten months.

== Career in Australia ==
After marrying an Australian woman and visiting that country in 1976 he decided to make Australia his home.

In 1977, while waiting tables at the Hyatt Kingsgate Sydney, Thompson received his first break into Australian television, when he was cast in the ongoing role of Toby Buxton in the soap opera Number 96. At that time the once top-rated Number 96 – which presented a heady mix of comedy, drama, melodrama and sex and nudity – was experiencing declining ratings so fought back by re-emphasising sexual situations and nudity. Thompson's character would be shown enlisting the services of a prostitute for a bondage and domination session, and became the first male to be shown full frontally nude in the series. Thompson's role lasted from April until June 1977; the show was cancelled soon after and the final episode was transmitted in August 1977.

He followed this with the key role of the clean-cut Dr Bruce Russell in teen oriented serial The Restless Years, which began on-air in December 1977. Thompson became the only cast member to appear continuously for the programme's entire 1977–1981 run. Other credits in Australia cover live theatre, television series and morning television.

== Hotelier ==
Thompson eventually chose to leave acting and devote himself to what would prove to be a successful career in the hotel industry. Working his way up from waiter, he eventually served as general manager of the Hyatt Regency Sydney, the Park Hyatt Canberra, the Park Hyatt Tokyo, and the Park Hyatt Los Angeles. While at the Park Hyatt Tokyo, Thompson coordinated the shooting of the film Lost in Translation at the hotel in 2002. To ensure that guests would not be disturbed, Thompson insisted that all filming take place at night, between midnight and 6:00 am, and that the crew be escorted by a hotel employee at all times. Although several Park Hyatt employees were cast as extras, Thompson himself does not appear in the film.

=== Awards ===
Thompson was thrice nominated for Hyatt International General Manager of the Year. In 2006, he returned to Japan to serve as general manager of The Peninsula Tokyo, which opened for business on 13 September 2007.
