= Evangelos Goussis =

Australian boxer, kickboxer and murderer

- Born: 14 September 1967 (age 59); Tashkent, Uzbek Soviet Socialist Republic, USSR (now Uzbekistan)
- Other name: Ange Goussis
- Occupations: Boxer, kickboxer, bouncer
- Known for: World Kickboxing Association middleweight champion (early 1990s)
- Parents: Aristides Goussis; Mahi Goussis
- Status: Imprisoned
- Convictions: Drug trafficking (1989); Attempted murder (1989); Murder (2006); Murder (2008); Intentionally causing serious injury
- Penalty: Life imprisonment with a non-parole period of 33 years

Evangelos "Ange" Goussis (born 14 September 1967) is an Australian former boxer and kickboxer from Geelong, Victoria, and is a multiple murderer, guilty of the murders of two victims of the Melbourne gangland killings.

== Early life ==
Goussis was born in Tashkent, in the former Uzbek Soviet Socialist Republic, of the USSR to a family of Greek immigrants in Uzbekistan.

Ange Goussis' father, Aristides Goussis, had been a resistance fighter against the Nazis during World War II for Greece, and was a communist guerilla in the brutal Greek Civil War of the late 1940s. In 1949, following the victory against the communist guerillas in Greece, Aristides and his wife, Mahi, a Red Cross child-care worker, fled to Uzbekistan.

Goussis arrived in Australia, aged eight years. After leaving school, Goussis held various jobs such as an apprentice motor mechanic, a sheet metal worker, fitness consultant and nightclub bouncer. During his early twenties, Goussis drifted into a life of crime after meeting many criminal associates via his employment as a bouncer and via boxing.

In November 1989, Goussis was convicted of attempted murder and trafficking in heroin and sentenced to a term of imprisonment. In March 2004, he was convicted of carrying an unregistered firearm.

=== Boxing and kickboxing career ===
As a boxer, Goussis won the inaugural Lionel Rose Shield. By 1987, he was a contender for the 1988 Summer Olympics to be held in Seoul; however, he did not qualify. In the early 1990s, Goussis competed in kickboxing. Goussis became the (WKA) World Kickboxing Association middleweight champion. Goussis' name stands alongside many other Greek kickboxing greats such as former world champions, Stan 'The Man' Longinidis and Tosca Petridis, Louie 'The Ice' Iosifidis, and current world champion 'Iron' Mike Zambidis and others. Goussis went eventually back to boxing, however, training with Keith Ellis. He had three professional fights, TKO-ing Shane Wirth in 39 seconds in March 1995 and drawing with Ricky Jackson two weeks later. In October 1997, at Bondi, he stopped Adam Turner in the first round.

== Melbourne gangland killings ==
=== Murder of Lewis Caine ===
Lewis Caine (also known as Sean Vincent) was an underworld figure based in Melbourne, and boyfriend of lawyer Zarah Garde-Wilson. Caine had lived with Garde-Wilson for a period of approximately two years before his death.

On 8 May 2004 Goussis and associate Keith Faure travelled to Melbourne from Geelong to meet with Caine in a Carlton hotel at the invitation of Faure. The body of Caine was found with a single gunshot wound to his head in a dead-end Brunswick street on 8 May 2004. At his trial for the murder of Caine, Goussis claimed self-defence, stating Caine produced a gun and fired at him; however, the gun jammed. Goussis stated he then shot Caine in the head with a single shot before dumping his body in the laneway. Goussis was found guilty by a jury for the murder of Caine.

=== Murder of Lewis Moran ===
Masked gunmen entered the Brunswick Club on Sydney Road, Brunswick at approximately 6:40 pm on 31 March 2004. Moran ran from his place at the bar and through a poker machine room before the gunman caught up with him and shot him twice, the fatal bullet being fired into the back of his head from a few centimetres away. Associate Bertie Wrout was severely wounded but survived the attack.

On 29 May 2008, Goussis was found guilty of the murder of Lewis Moran and on 9 February 2009, was sentenced to life imprisonment with a minimum 30-year non-parole period.

== Other legal matters ==
Goussis was under investigation for the murder of male prostitute, Shane Chartres-Abbott, who was shot dead in a professional hit outside his Reservoir home on 4 June 2003. Chartres-Abbott was travelling to the Melbourne County Court where he was due to appear to face rape charges. On 8 July 2014 the Victorian Supreme Court jury found that Goussis and two other co-accused were not guilty for the murder of Chartres-Abbott.

In 2013 growing disquiet emerged regarding the nature of the evidence used to secure Goussis's convictions. It was revealed that contradictory accounts by the primary prosecution witness had been rewritten to fit in with telephone call records provided by police. In 2014 Goussis released his account of events, alleging police misconduct, and called for a royal commission.
