= Sweethearts (1990 film) =

- Based on: Sweethearts by Colin Talbot
- Written by: Colin Talbot
- Directed by: Colin Talbot
- Starring: Christabel Wigley; John F. Howard
- Music by: Paul Grabowsky
- Country of origin: Australia
- Original language: English

Production
- Producer: Lynda House
- Cinematography: Terry Howells; Peter Tammer
- Editor: Christina De Podolinsky
- Running time: 78 minutes
- Production companies: Sweethearts Film Productions; Australian Film Commission

Original release
- Release: 1990

Sweethearts is a 1990 Australian film directed by Colin Talbot and starring Christabel Wigley and John F. Howard. The screenplay is about Juliet and Laura, who are looking for excitement.

Sweethearts was based on a novel written in 1978. Talbot wrote the script in Bali in 1987 and made the film with the assistance of the AFC.

== Cast ==
- Christabel Wigley as Juliette
- John F. Howard as John F. Howard
- Richard Clendinnen
- Henry Maas as Zero Hotel MC
- Ria Schmertz as the pretty girl pulling faces at the end
