= John "Snowy" Cutmore =

Australian criminal (1895–1927)

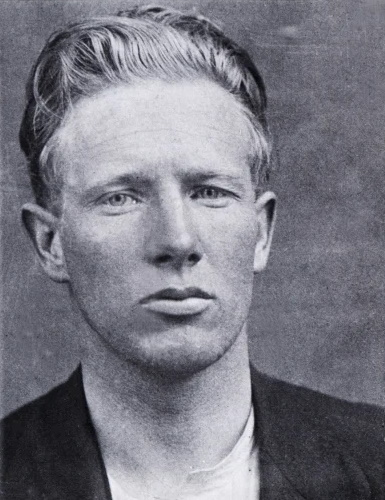
- Cutmore in 1920
- Born: John Daniel Cutmore; 29 August 1895; South Melbourne, Australia
- Died: 27 October 1927 (aged 32); Carlton, Victoria, Australia
- Cause of death: Gunshot wounds to the chest
- Other names: 'Snowy' Cutmore; John Harris; John Watson; Snowy Kenyon, John Daniel; John McLaughlin (or McLoughlin); John Nolan
- Occupation: Criminal
- Spouse: Gladys King (de facto)

John Daniel "Snowy" Cutmore (29 August 1895 – 27 October 1927), was an Australian criminal, well known in the criminal underworld of both Melbourne and Sydney during the inter-war years until his violent death in 1927. Cutmore was raised in inner-city Melbourne and was a prominent member of the Fitzroy Push, a lawless gang involved in prostitution, sly-grog and violence. Throughout his criminal career Cutmore displayed a willingness to relocate to another state to evade police attention, often travelling between Melbourne and Sydney (and occasionally Adelaide). For a short period from late 1926 he was a member of Norman Bruhn's criminal gang in Sydney, attributed as Australia's first razor gang at the beginning of a period of gang violence in Sydney in the late-1920s known as the 'razor gang wars'. Cutmore was shot and killed in his mother's home in Carlton in October 1927, in an underworld gunfight that also resulted in the death of his rival, Squizzy Taylor.

'Snowy' Cutmore's life and times were portrayed in the television series on the Nine television network in Australia, Underbelly: Razor and Underbelly: Squizzy. He also appears in the 1982 biopic Squizzy Taylor, where he was played by Steve Bisley.

== Early life ==
Cutmore was born on 29 August 1895, at South Melbourne, the eldest of two children of John Samuel Cutmore and Bridget Delia (née McLaughlin). His younger brother James was born in 1899 at Collingwood.^{[A]}

Cutmore's father worked as a cook and in 1914 the family was living in Princess Street, Fitzroy (though the father was possibly living in Western Australia by then). Cutmore senior enlisted in the First Australian Imperial Force in November 1914 at the Blackboy Hill military training camp in Western Australia and served overseas for virtually the entire duration of World War I returning to Australia only briefly in 1916. His next of kin as recorded on his enlistment papers was his wife, Delia Cutmore. Cutmore senior worked as a cook in the army and served at Gallipoli and the Middle East. He returned to Australia in August 1916 and disembarked at Fremantle. After a brief period Cutmore then returned overseas, arriving in England in December 1916 and serving in France until the end of the war. He spent periods in hospital in France and London (his record notated, "premature senility"). He eventually returned to Australia, disembarking at Melbourne in March 1919. John S. Cutmore returned to Western Australia at some point; he died in Perth in 1938.

== Criminal activities ==
On 1 September 1914, Cutmore (then aged 19) stole a number of items from a driver named Francis Davidson in the yard of the Tankerville Arms Hotel in Nicholson Street, Fitzroy. The items stolen were a gold chain, "a memorandum book, five tram tickets, a pair of spectacles" and five shillings worth of copper coins. Cutmore was arrested for the offence and granted bail to appear at the Fitzroy Court, but he subsequently absconded from bail and a warrant was issued for his arrest. In late September 1914 a warrant was issued for the arrest of two men, one of whom was "identical with one Snowy Cutmore", charged with "inciting a prisoner, William Harvey, to resist arrest" by Constable Malseed at Carlton on 14 September 1914.

In the early hours of 31 October 1914, Cutmore and Thomas Hillary, a sergeant in the Australian Expeditionary Force, assaulted two drunken sailors named Albert Florence and Frederick Akin in Bourke Street, Melbourne. Cutmore was seen to kick the sailors on the face and head and jump on one of them, in an attack described as "of a very savage character". Hillary struck the men with his fists. Cutmore and Hillary were chased by night porters (who had witnessed the assault) and several constables. Cutmore was found lying in a right-of-way, pretending to be drunk (but his heavy breathing indicated he had been running). Hillary hid in a partially constructed building in Little Bourke Street, but was found after a search. Both young men were charged with having assaulted the sailors. Cutmore gave his name as 'John Harris'. The sailors were treated at the Melbourne Hospital, Florence for cuts and abrasions and Akin for three broken ribs, a badly damaged eye and severe abrasions. On 5 November 'Harris' (Cutmore) and Hillary were tried in the City Court on the assault charges, which they denied on oath. Cutmore, who had used the most violence, was fined £10 (in default, two months' imprisonment) and Hillary £5 (in default, one month's imprisonment).

In February 1916, Cutmore (again under the name 'John Harris') was charged at Fitzroy police station with assault; he was subsequently convicted and fined 40 shillings (in default, seven days' imprisonment). Less than a week later he was charged at Carlton police station with "inciting", under the name 'John Watson'. On this occasion Cutmore was fined 20 shillings (in default, seven days' imprisonment). He was also arrested, on a warrant dating from 1914, for larceny from Francis Samuel Davidson.

=== Enlistment and desertation ===
Cutmore enlisted in the Australian Imperial Force on 6 April 1916. At the time of enlistment he was recorded as salesman, living with his mother in Wellington Street, Collingwood. In his enlistment papers he declared he had never been "convicted by a Civil Power". Cutmore soon discovered he was unsuited to military discipline, finding "the authority of superior officers unbearable". On 5 July 1916 Private Cutmore was reported to be absent without leave from the Royal Park army camp, north of Melbourne city. He was apprehended on 25 July. On examination Cutmore was found to be suffering from a venereal disease "and was placed in isolation". He escaped from custody the following day. Cutmore was later apprehended and treated in November 1916 at Royal Park for gonorrhoea. On 22 December 1916 he was declared a deserter and discharged from the army.

=== The shooting of Cleary ===
After December 1916, Cutmore was sought by the police as a military deserter. Police believed Cutmore had been in Adelaide and Sydney, but returned to Melbourne in about April 1917. During this period he was keeping company with another Melbourne criminal, Henry Dunn (alias Slater), known as 'Long Harry'.

On Saturday evening, 2 June 1917, Cutmore and 'Long Harry' Dunn attended a party at a grog-shop in Fitzroy Street, Fitzroy, an establishment kept by Ettie Jones, described by police as "an old time brothel keeper". Also attending the party that night was a 29-year-old flyweight boxer and newspaper-vendor, Charlie Cleary, and Cleary's boarder, a convicted criminal named Walter 'Cull' Johnson. At about 2 a.m. an argument was heard in the street down from the grog-shop (near the corner with Brunswick-place). The angry voices were followed by the sound of five gunshots. A neighbour, woken by the noises, saw four men at the scene, two of whom departed soon afterwards. The taller man was heard to say to his companion, "It is no use, he is shot now, you had better walk away, the police will be here soon". When neighbours and others nearby attended the scene, Charlie Cleary was found lying on the footpath with a head wound, trying to pull himself into a sitting position. The wounded man was dazed and still conscious; he had been shot at close range, with a small-bore bullet wound above his ear. Cleary's companion, 'Cull' Johnson, ran down to Gertrude Street and hailed a hansom cab to take Cleary to hospital.

When police at the Fitzroy station were alerted to the incident in the early hours of Sunday morning, they found Cleary and Johnson in the hansom cab near where the shooting had occurred, with Cleary bleeding profusely from his head. When asked who had shot him, the wounded man replied, "I am not shot, I only fell down". Cleary was initially taken to the Fitzroy watch-house and then to St Vincent's Hospital. When he was later interviewed in hospital, he told police he didn't remember where he had been or who shot him, adding, "You know I would be the last one to give any one away". Cleary's companion, 'Cull' Johnson, was equally reticent to provide details. An operation was performed on the wounded man and the bullet removed, after which his condition was reported to be "less serious". Cleary lingered for a fortnight in the hospital but died on 17 June.^{[B]}

An inquiry into the death of Cleary was held on 24 July by the Coroner, Dr Robert Cole. Amongst those who testified were police witnesses who gave evidence about Cleary's persistent refusal to disclose any information about the shooting before he died. Medical testimony showed that Cleary's wound behind the ear was scorched, indicating that the bullet had been fired at close range. Two men, described as "allegedly material witnesses", were named as John ('Snowy') Cutmore and Henry Dunn, both of whom had "disappeared, and their whereabouts are unknown by the police". In consequent of the absence of these witnesses the inquiry was adjourned, and warrants were to be issued for the arrest of the two men. On 25 July a notice was printed in the New South Wales Police Gazette & Weekly Record of Crime requesting "special inquiry" to trace John 'Snowy' Cutmore in connection with the shooting of Charles Cleary. The notice stated there were "good grounds for believing that evidence will be forthcoming to connect him with the death of Cleary". It was reported in August 1917 that "the police throughout the Commonwealth" were seeking the missing witness 'Snowy' Cutmore.

=== Activities in Sydney ===
Cutmore went 'into smoke' to Sydney in the wake of the Cleary shooting. On 23 March 1918 John 'Snowy' Cutmore (alias Nolan) was found to have goods which were "reasonably suspected of being stolen", namely two sets of harness and one kit bag, at a house in Pelican Street, Surry Hills. He was subsequently arrested and charged. Cutmore was described as being a native of Victoria and "a reputed sly-grog seller and a companion of the worst class of criminals". He was granted bail and promptly absconded, after which he probably returned to Melbourne for a brief period. On 4 October 1918 a farmer named John Boyd, living at Gore Street, Fitzroy, reported to police that he had been assaulted and robbed outside the Tankerville Arms Hotel in Fitzroy. He was robbed of cash amounting to £3.5s and a black felt hat. Boyd identified the offenders as "Snowy Cutmore and Paddy Doyle", both of whom were "well known to the Carlton police". By December 1918 the police in Sydney had decided to not proceed with the charge against Cutmore relating to the stolen harnesses.

By mid-December Cutmore had returned to Sydney. Late on the morning of Tuesday, 17 December 1918, a gardener, Ling Sing, of McKeown Street in Maroubra, disturbed two men "in the act of stealing from his hut". The intruders drew revolvers at the gardener before departing, taking with them a sheath-knife. As they were leaving Sing grabbed his own gun and fired after them, with one of the men returning fire. Sing reported that he had hit one of the intruders in the thigh. The two men were identified as Cutmore (alias Watson or Nolan) and Charles Lyons.

At about midday on the following day, 18 December, "a disturbance occurred" at a house in Richards Avenue, Surry Hills, in which a man named Vincent Cook was "cut about the head" and a woman, Mrs. Bartlett, "was slightly injured". Police arrived at the house to investigate and while they were present a man, later identified in the press as Cutmore, entered the premises holding an axe. On seeing the police Cutmore ran, closely pursued by several policemen. During the chase Detective James fired three shots into the air. Cutmore was apprehended in Riley Lane and taken to Darlinghurst police station where he was charged with assault. After their injuries were treated, Cook and Bartlett stayed away from the house. Another family occupied another section of the house and they "retired to bed at the usual hour". Shortly before three o'clock on the following morning a bomb made of gelignite was thrown through the window into the unoccupied front bedroom of the house, "wrecking it, and destroying the contents".

In January 1919 Cutmore and Lyons were arrested for the robbery in December from the hut at Maroubra, committed for trial and allowed bail. On 30 January 1919 Cutmore was charged at the Central police station with assaulting a constable. He was found guilty and fined £5 or six weeks imprisonment. In February 1919 it was decided not to proceed with the prosecution for the Maroubra robbery.

=== The Fitzroy vendetta ===
'Snowy' Cutmore and the notorious Melbourne criminal, 'Squizzy' Taylor, developed an enduring mutual animosity dating from about 1918 until their violent deaths in October 1927. The origin of the enmity between the two men has been attributed to the period of gang violence in Melbourne known as the 'Fitzroy vendetta'. The gang violence, a feud between the Fitzroy push and the Richmond push, began with a jewellery robbery in June 1918 and escalated into wide-ranging gang warfare aimed at avenging perceived grievances and domination of the inner-city sly grog trade. The Richmond push was headed by Taylor and the "two-up king" Henry Stokes, while the opposing gang was based in Fitzroy and included Edward 'Ted' Whiting, Henry 'Long Harry' Dunn (alias Slater) and Frederick Thorpe (alias Searby).

Cutmore was a part of the Fitzroy gang, but was living in Sydney for most of the period of the escalating violence between the Melbourne gangs. However, one incident during the period of the 'Fitzroy vendetta' was probably the most important factor in explaining the deep-seated hostility between 'Snowy' Cutmore and 'Squizzy' Taylor, namely the shooting of Harry Dunn by Taylor's ally, Henry Stokes, in May 1919. Dunn (or Henry Slater as he became more widely known) was a personal friend of Cutmore's. The shooting of Slater had been preceded by an escalation of violence between the Richmond and Fitzroy gangs. Within a space of days, a Richmond gang member was shot seven times, a man was brutally beaten by members of the Fitzroy push, and shots were fired at Ted Whiting and into the house of another Fitzroy gang member. Shortly after midday on Monday, 12 May 1919, in the busy thoroughfare of Little Collins Street, Henry Stokes shot Slater five times with a Colt automatic pistol. Slater was wounded four times in the chest and once in the left wrist. Stokes was apprehended by a police constable as he ran from the scene and charged with attempted murder. Stokes claimed he shot Slater in self-defence and, when tried, was found not guilty.

=== Return to Melbourne ===
Late at night on 9 February 1920 a brawl broke out in a restaurant in Elgin Street, Carlton, and a man (believed to be 'Snowy' Cutmore) was ejected from the establishment. As he was being thrown out Cutmore produced a revolver and fired three shots, one of which wounded the waiter, Peter Linas, in the leg. A warrant was issued for Cutmore's arrest (under the name 'Snowy Kenyon', "supposed identical with John Daniel Cutmore") for "shooting with intent to murder" the waiter.

On 24 August 1920, police went to Cutmore's home in Barkly Street, Carlton. When he became aware of the policemen at the house, Cutmore tried to hide inside the chimney. While searching the house the detectives heard "a curious scraping noise" and, with Cutmore unable to maintain his position up the chimney, "a soot-begrimed, dishevelled individual slid down... into the fireplace". He was taken to the city lockup where he was charged with having camisoles and other articles of women's apparel in his possession which were suspected of having been stolen. Cutmore was also charged with having shot Peter Linas in February 1920 "with intent to commit murder".

On 3 September 1920, Cutmore was sentenced in the Carlton Police Court to one months' imprisonment "for having had in his possession articles of women's apparel believed to have been stolen from a Johnston Street shop". An appeal was lodged against the conviction. On 20 September 1920 at the Northcote Police Court, Cutmore was convicted of multiple charges: offensive behaviour (fined £5 or one month imprisonment in default of payment), resisting police (£5 or one month imprisonment), obscene language (£10 or three months) and assault of a police officer (£10 or three months). The appeal against the earlier illegal possession charge was heard in the Victorian Supreme Court on 15 October and the appeal was dismissed. Cutmore was tried in the Criminal Court on 19 October 1920 with intent to murder Peter Linas, or do him grievous bodily harm. The accused gave evidence under oath that on the night of the shooting he was in Geelong. Cutmore's alibi was supported by other witnesses. He was found not guilty and discharged.

On the morning of 12 February 1921, two young men named Ernest Porter and John Collision were assaulted by three men on the beach at Port Melbourne. The assailants — William Maher, Robert Brown and Cutmore – initially struck the two men with their fists. During the attack Maher drew a revolver and fired at Collision from a distance of six yards (5.5 metres), the bullet passing within a few inches of his right ear. At this Collision and Porter "ran for their lives" to the local police station. Police arrived at the beach in time to apprehend the three men and their female companion. Later that morning a revolver was found at the beach. The three men were charged with assault and Maher faced a further charge of discharging a firearm with intent to commit murder. They faced the court at Port Melbourne on 21 February, and each were convicted of assault. Maher's firearm charge was reduced to "unlawfully discharging a firearm in a public place". Cutmore was fined £10 for the assault conviction (or two months' imprisonment in default of payment).

On Sunday evening, 19 June 1921, groups of men from rival gangs clashed in the vicinity of the corner Nicholson and Palmerston streets in Carlton. Bystanders witnessed several acts of violence, including a man being knocked down and kicked, and left lying on the tram track. Another man named James Sollery was chased into Palmerston Street by a number of men calling out, "Into him 'Checkers'". Sollery was caught and struck by 'Snowy' Cutmore and another of the pursuers kicked Sollery. Senior-Constable Lewis was riding a passing tram when he witnessed the attacks and jumped off the tram to intervene. He managed to apprehend Cutmore, but the policeman was then attacked by the others and was made to release him, after which the group ran away. The attackers were identified as members of the 'Checkers' Push, a gang based in the Carlton North/Fitzroy area of Melbourne. Police later arrested three members of the 'push': John Buckley, Arthur Ryan and John 'Snowy' Cutmore. The men were tried in the Fitzroy Court on 29 June. All three were found guilty of offensive behaviour. Both Buckley and Cutmore were convicted of additional charges: Buckley for assaulting a man who went to Lewis' assistance and Cutmore for the assault of Sollery (for which he was sentenced to two months' imprisonment) and resisting arrest (fined £10, or in default six weeks' imprisonment).

=== Adelaide ===
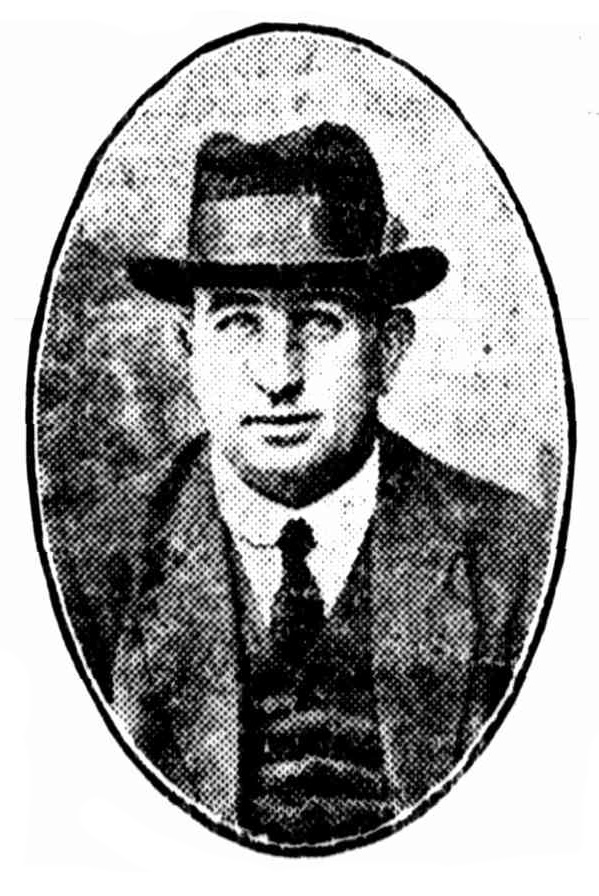
Cutmore's friend and ally, Harry Dunn (alias Slater); published in The Sun (Sydney), 14 December 1921.

In November 1921 Cutmore and Henry Slater (Dunn) were arrested in a West-terrace boarding-house in Adelaide, reported to be "the haunt of thieves". The police found a bag in their room holding two automatic revolvers and two clips of cartridges incorporating "expanding bullets". Cutmore acknowledged ownership of the bag but stated that it contained only "dirty shirts". Slater was charged with the murder of Thomas Monaghan in Sydney on 19 June. He was remanded in custody and sent to Sydney to answer the murder charge. Cutmore was charged with the unlawful possession of the two revolvers and with "having insufficient lawful means of support". He was released on bail, consisting of a personal bond of £150 and two sureties of £75 each. A "boarding-house proprietress and a ham shop proprietor" had entered into the required bonds for Cutmore. In the end, however, the charges against Cutmore were dismissed. Cutmore's companion, Harry Slater, was tried in Sydney on three separate occasions for Monaghan's murder, but each time the jury failed to agree on a verdict; he was freed in May 1922 after the Attorney-General decided to not proceed with the charge.

=== Absconding from bail ===
On 9 April 1922 Constable Smith had come upon a group of men "playing cards and arguing" at the corner of Kay and Rathdowne streets in Carlton. The policeman spoke to the men, most of whom dispersed. However, three remained "and assumed an insolent attitude". The encounter ended when the men attacked the constable, striking and kicking him before running away. Later on, two of the men (Cutmore and Alfred Lee) were arrested on warrant. At the Carlton Court on 21 April Lee was convicted of assaulting Constable Smith. At the same hearing Cutmore was called upon to answer a similar charge, but failed to appear, resulting in his bail being estreated. Cutmore then absconded to Sydney.

At midday on 7 July 1922 Cutmore and another man walked into Samuel Searle's tailor shop in Belmore Road, Randwick. The men snatched a roll of serge and one of tweed and hastily left the premises. Constable Glover witnessed the robbery and chased the men. The policeman managed to catch and handcuff one of the men after a fight. Another policeman, Constable Day, was passing on a tram; he jumped off and pursued the other man. After a chase of about a quarter of a mile Day fired a shot over the thief's head, who then surrendered. Cutmore was charged with larceny (under the name 'John McLaughlin'), granted bail and then absconded, this time back to Melbourne.

Cutmore had returned to Melbourne when he was arrested on about New Year's Day 1923, on the charge of assaulting Constable Smith in Carlton in April 1922. He faced the Carlton Court on 4 January 1923 and was convicted of the assault (for which he was fined £20, or in default three months' imprisonment), playing cards in the street (fined £1, in default 24 hours' imprisonment) and having absconded from bail (forfeiture of his bail of £25). In addition, however, Cutmore was remanded to face the New South Wales charge of having stolen cloth at Randwick on 7 July 1922 (on which charge he had previously absconded from his bail). By March 1923 the Sydney police had provided information to the Victorian Police, and Cutmore was committed for trial, charged with stealing serge and cloth belonging to Searle valued at £25.

Cutmore was returned to Sydney and tried (as 'John McLaughlin') in the Sydney Quarter Sessions on 21 May 1923 on the Randwick larceny charge. He was found guilty and sentenced to twelve months' hard labour in Bathurst gaol.

=== Razor gang ===
Cutmore probably remained in Sydney after his term of incarceration in Bathurst gaol. In 1926 he was working as a horse trainer and living in Doncaster Avenue at Randwick with his de facto wife, Gladys King. In August 1926 Cutmore was fined £30 for sly-grog selling in the Central Police Court in Sydney. In October he appealed against the amount of the fine.

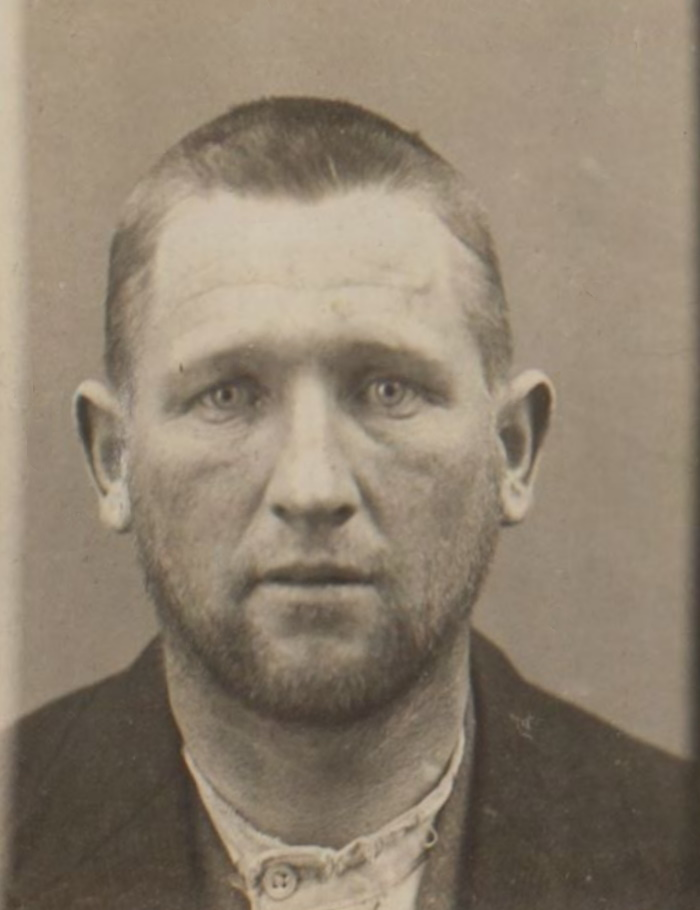
Norman Bruhn, photographed in October 1921.

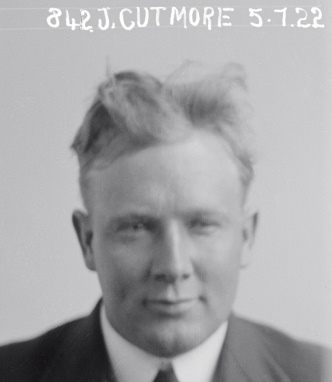
John 'Snowy' Cutmore, photographed in July 1922.

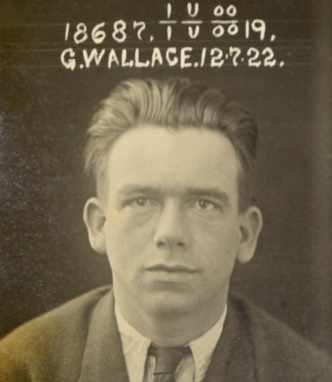
George 'The Midnight Raper' Wallace, photographed in July 1922.

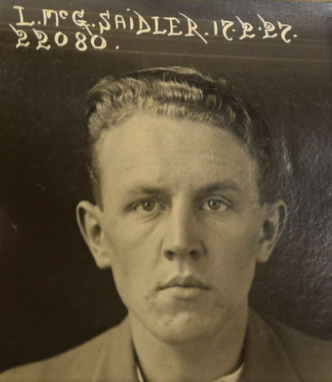
Lancelot 'Sailor the Slasher' Saidler, photographed in February 1927.

In late 1926, Cutmore joined up with Norman Bruhn, a Melbourne criminal who had absconded from bail on a shooting and wounding charge, arriving in Sydney in about November 1926. Bruhn assembled a gang which included John 'Snowy' Cutmore, George 'The Midnight Raper' Wallace, Lancelot 'Sailor the Slasher' Saidler, and the albino standover man, 'Razor' Jack Hayes.

In March 1927, the Pistol License Act became law, which required a license in order to carry or possess a pistol; anybody found with a concealable weapon without a license was subject to a fine of up to £100, with an addition of six months imprisonment if found to be carrying an unlicensed gun at night. As a consequence the weapon of choice of Bruhn's gang became the straight razor (often called the cut-throat razor), with a sharp blade that could be folded back into its handle and easily hidden from view. The group of criminals led by Bruhn in Sydney are attributed as Australia's first 'razor gang'.

The modus operandi of Bruhn's razor gang was to specifically target criminals, such as cocaine traffickers and thieves, who wished to avoid police attention. The straight razor was used to threaten, intimidate and disfigure their opponents. Their victims were invariably those who wished to avoid the police, such as cocaine traffickers, thieves and prostitutes, who were attacked and threatened in laneways and side streets, and occasionally in their own homes. Money was demanded, and if not forthcoming the person "would be slashed about the face and body with a razor". The criminal underworld "regarded 'informing' as the one unpardonable sin", so any cases that came to the attention of the police were invariably discontinued due to a lack of information.

Bruhn and his gang came into direct conflict with underworld figures such as Kate Leigh, Tilly Devine and Phil 'The Jew' Jeffs as they began to focus on disrupting the established cocaine-distribution business in Sydney. The first step in the cocaine supply chain were the seamen and dockworkers who smuggled the drug from the ships and out of the docks to the middlemen in the pubs or houses where it was stashed. Bruhn and his gang targeted the next step in the chain, the 'runners' who moved cocaine from the safe houses of the inner city suburbs to the distributors. Police estimated there were nearly five thousand "customers of the dope sellers" in the Darlinghurst and Potts Point districts. Bruhn also targeted his rivals' sly-grog shops and brothels by ransacking the premises, beating up customers and demanding 'standover' payments.

=== Murder of Norman Bruhn ===
On Wednesday night, 22 June 1927, Norman Bruhn and three other men, engaged the taxi driver, Noel Infield, near Paddington Post Office. At their request the taxi-driver took them to Charlotte Lane in Darlinghurst, close to the south-east corner of Hyde Park, and was told to wait. The four men entered a house in Hargrave Street (a cross street with Charlotte Lane). A short time later gunshots rang out and Bruhn was shot twice in the abdomen in the lane outside. Men were seen running from the scene and police arrived soon afterwards. Infield was assisted by one of Bruhn's companions to get the wounded man into the taxi. Bruhn was taken to Sydney Hospital where he died the following morning, aged 33 years. Although he was conscious and in full possession of his faculties until his death, Bruhn repeatedly refused to give police any information about the man who shot him. Other witnesses were also reluctant to give information to the police.

In August 1927 a reward of £200 was offered by the New South Wales Government for information leading to the apprehension and conviction of the person or persons responsible for Bruhn's death. In addition to the reward, the Government offered to extend a pardon to any accomplice who may provide such information. It was speculated that Bruhn's death was a reprisal against the activities of his razor gang against the network of cocaine-selling in Sydney. Cutmore may have been one of the men accompanying Bruhn on the night he was murdered, with some believing he was involved or complicit in the shooting, but ultimately the silence of witnesses or their refusal to provide consistent testimony stymied police investigations.

=== The shoot-out ===
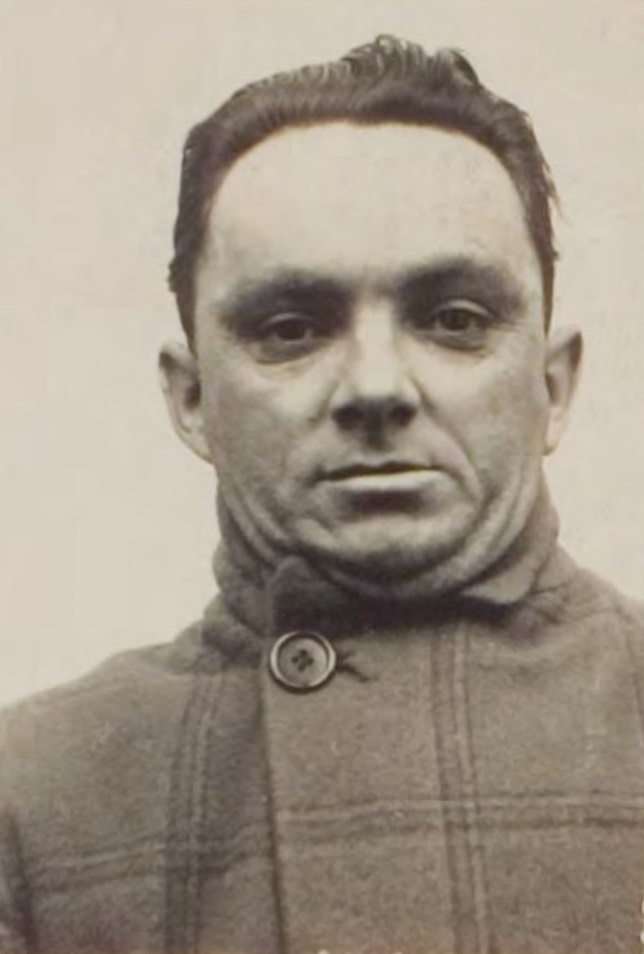
'Squizzy' Taylor (police identification photograph from July 1924).

Cutmore 'went to ground' after Bruhn's murder; he remained in Sydney until late October, when he returned to Melbourne. For the last few weeks prior to his departure he resided in a flat in Double Bay belonging to Phil 'The Jew' Jeffs, a Sydney criminal involved in prostitution, sly-grog and cocaine-distribution.^{[C]}

Cutmore's de facto wife, Gladys King, had returned to Melbourne in early October and was living with Cutmore's mother at 50 Barkly Street, Carlton. 'Snowy' Cutmore arrived in Melbourne from Sydney on 23 October 1927, with the stated purpose of attending the spring racing carnival. Cutmore had travelled by overnight train from Sydney with a man named Roy ('Budgie') Travers (alias Herbert Wilson), an ally of Phil Jeffs. Cutmore attended the Richmond races on Monday, 24 October, where he encountered 'Squizzy' Taylor and the two "exchanged threats". Cutmore was spotted at the races by Detectives Milne and West, and "on account of his past associations", he was ordered off the course. The next day Cutmore was taken ill with influenza and took to his bed in his mother's house in Carlton.

Shortly after 5 p.m. on Thursday, 27 October 1927, Leslie 'Squizzy' Taylor and two other men approached hire-car driver John Hall's Studebaker sedan in Lonsdale Street from the direction of the Bookmakers' Club and hired his car. At their instruction Hall drove the men to several hotels in Carlton (one hotel on the corner of Palmerston and Rathdown streets and two other hotels in Drummond Street), before being ordered to pull up in Barkly Street soon after 6 p.m., about 55 yards (50 metres) from the Cutmore house. Taylor and one of the men got out and entered the house while the other man remained in the car. In the house Cutmore's mother Bridget was cooking tea in the detached kitchen. Her daughter-in-law Gladys had gone to the dairy for milk and the only other occupants were her bed-ridden son, and John 'Scotty' King, "under the influence of drink" in the front bedroom. Travers, who had travelled from Sydney with Cutmore, claimed he was in the yard chopping wood at the time. Bridget Cutmore heard footsteps in the passageway, but her son had been having a number of visitors since his return from Sydney, so she took little notice.

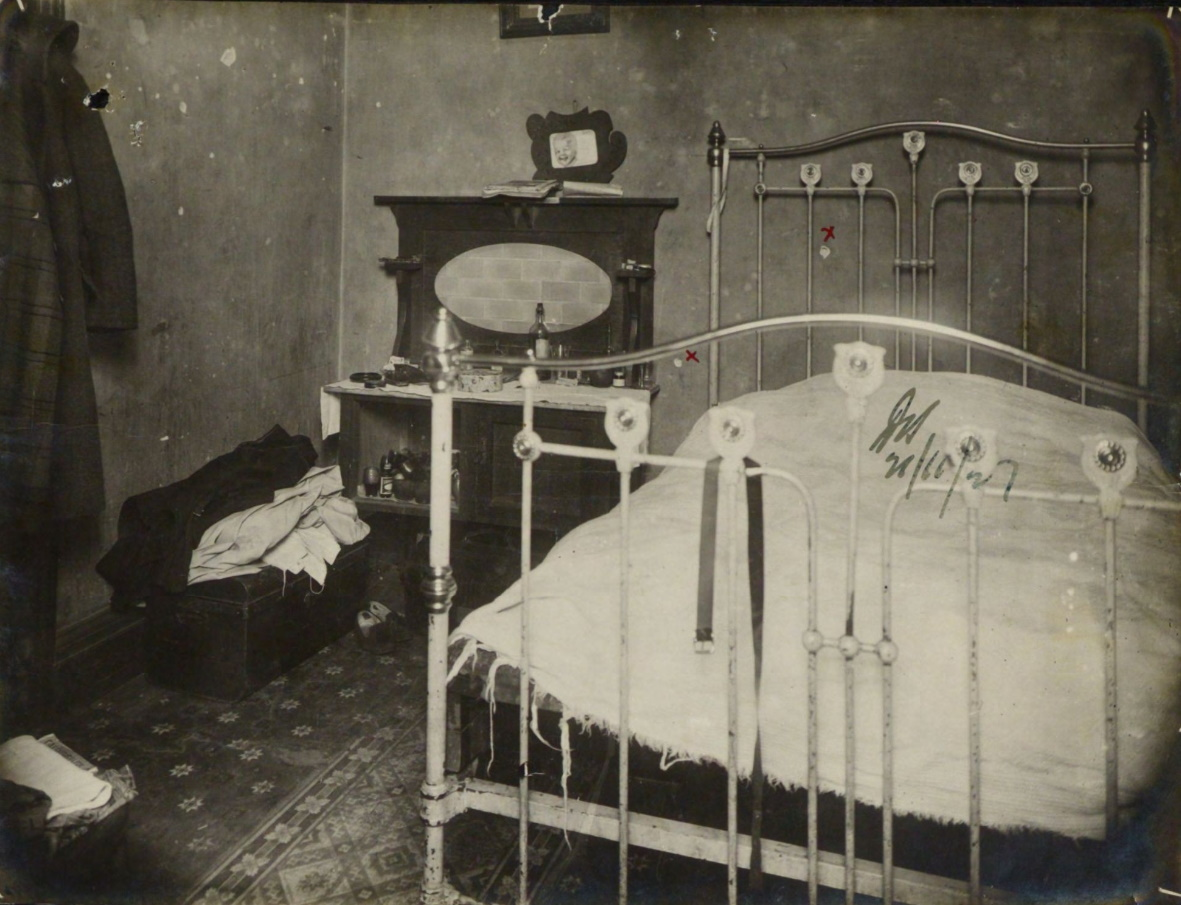
Cutmore's bedroom, scene of the fatal shoot-out between Cutmore and ‘Squizzy’ Taylor (photograph from the inquest report).

Taylor and the other man walked down the hall and entered Cutmore's bedroom. Angry shouting was heard by Bridget Cutmore "followed by a fusillade of pistol shots". The three men in the room, including Cutmore in his sick-bed, were each armed with revolvers and had started shooting at each other. Mrs Cutmore rushed to the room and was hit in the right shoulder by a bullet in the crossfire. Further shots were fired before Taylor and the other man left the house. 'Snowy' Cutmore lay dead in his bed, with five bullet wounds, four of which had passed through his body (one of them through the heart). There was a wound on the little finger of his right hand where a bullet had struck the magazine of the pistol he had been holding.

John 'Snowy' Cutmore was not the only victim of the encounter; 'Squizzy' Taylor had also been wounded in his right side in the gunfight. Taylor staggered out the front door to Hall's hire car and told the driver, "I’m shot; drive me to the St Vincent’s Hospital". Hall and the other man helped Taylor into the car and they drove towards the hospital in nearby Fitzroy. When the car was stopped by cross traffic at the corner of Brunswick and Johnston streets, the other man said to Hall, "Here, you do the rest on your own"; he then got out of the car and ran off down Brunswick Street. Hall then took the now unconscious Taylor to the hospital where he died in the casualty ward half an hour after admission, without having regained consciousness. In one of Taylor's pockets an empty automatic revolver was found and in another pocket, a box of .32 calibre cartridges.

The police were informed soon afterwards when a man (possibly Roy Travers) rushed into the Carlton police station to report the shooting. When Detectives Grieve, Milne and McPhee reached 50 Barkly Street they found Cutmore's mother bleeding from her wound. She was taken to Melbourne Hospital, where her condition was assessed as not serious. The room in which the shoot-out had occurred was found to be in complete disarray: Cutmore was lying dead on the bed; the floor was littered with empty cartridge cases, a mirror and a kerosene lamp had been smashed and all four walls had bullet marks. No guns were found in the room. Later that evening a police constable found an automatic pistol lying inside a fence at an address facing Macarthur Square, close to the house in Barkly Street. The gun had a cartridge jammed in the barrel and was unable to be fired. On the following morning a constable on duty at the house found a third firearm, a Webley automatic pistol, in the cisten of the lavatory in the far corner of the yard.

=== Aftermath ===
Two days after the shooting police detained three men at Seymour in connection with "the Taylor-Cutmore shooting case" – Thomas Kelly, his brother Sidney Kelly, and Norman Smith. The men had been intending to drive to Sydney. Roy Travers, trying to make his way back to Sydney, was arrested on the railway platform at Albury and charged with vagrancy. Police held Smith, the Kelly brothers and Travers on remand for several weeks, but eventually whatever cases the police hoped to make against the men were withdrawn.

Cutmore was buried on the afternoon of 29 October in the Coburg Pine Ridge Cemetery in Preston, a northern suburb of Melbourne.

An inquest into the deaths of Taylor and Cutmore was held at the City Morgue on 16 and 21 November 1927. Medical evidence determined that Cutmore died from bullet wounds in the heart and lungs and Taylor died from a bullet wound in the liver. In regard to the specifics of the ballistics evidence, the Coroner returned an open verdict, finding there was insufficient evidence to determine who had fired the fatal shots.

== Cultural resonance ==
Reports of the shoot-out between 'Squizzy' Taylor and 'Snowy' Cutmore, and details from the subsequent inquest, were widely published in the metropolitan newspapers of all Australian states, as well as regional newspapers.

By February 1928 the Australian Waxworks touring exhibition, featuring a number of "figures of crime", included representations amongst its exhibits of both Snowy Cutmore and Squizzy Taylor ("of the Melbourne Underworld tragedy"). The touring exhibition was described as a "unique and wonderful collection of 45 figures, skilfully modelled in wax... surrounded by sonic effects, the figures appear most lifelike". The exhibition featured "continuous lectures" by "Prof. Chas. E. South" on the various groups of figures. The admission price for adults was one shilling (children half price).

== Notes ==
A.'Snowy' Cutmore's younger brother, James, also had a criminal history. He served sentences at Melbourne and Pentridge Gaols during 1919 and 1920, as well as a stint in the Reformatory Prison at Castlemaine. During the period 1940 to 1944 Cutmore was incarcerated on five occasions in HM Prison Pentridge. His criminal convictions included larceny, house-breaking, unlawful possession and "assault with intent to rob". James Francis Cutmore died on 8 September 1960 at Carlton, Victoria, aged 61 years.

B.Cleary's companion on the night of the shooting, Walter 'Cull' Johnson, married Ellen Cleary (Charlie Cleary's widow) in 1920 and was the step-father to her two sons. The family had moved to Ascot Vale by 1924. 'Cull' Johnson died on 18 December 1937, aged 49 years. Ellen Johnson died in 1971.

C.In December 1927, two months after Cutmore had left Sydney and met his death in Melbourne, Jeffs' flat (one of the Saxonia Flats in Double Bay) was raided and searched by the police. A packet of cocaine was found on the premises; the response by Jeffs to the discovery of the powder was, "It's all right, that is horse powder, which was left here by 'Snowy' Cutmore before he went to Melbourne". At Jeffs' trial in January 1928 for possession of the cocaine, Gladys King (Cutmore's de facto widow) gave evidence that the cocaine had belonged to her late husband, who had been administering it to the horses he had been training. The case against Jeffs was dismissed.
