= Squizzy Taylor (film) =

- Directed by: Kevin James Dobson
- Written by: Roger Simpson
- Produced by: Roger le Mesurier
- Starring: David Atkins; Jacki Weaver; Alan Cassell; Michael Long; Steve Bisley; Fred "Cul" Cullen
- Music by: Bruce Smeaton
- Distributed by: Filmways; Umbrella Entertainment
- Release date: 1982
- Running time: 97 minutes
- Country: Australia
- Language: English
- Budget: A$1.7 million

Squizzy Taylor is a 1982 Australian drama film based on the life of Melbourne gangster, Squizzy Taylor, directed by Kevin James Dobson and starring David Atkins, Jacki Weaver and Alan Cassell.

== Cast ==
- Alan Cassell as Det. Brophy
- David Atkins as Squizzy Taylor
- Jacki Weaver as Dolly
- Robert Hughes as Reg Harvey
- Steve Bisley as 'Snowy' Cutmore
- Michael Long as Det. Piggott
- Kim Lewis as Ida Pender
- Fred "Cul" Cullen as Henry Stokes
- Peter Hosking as Angus Murray
- Tony Rickards as Dutch
- Simon Thorpe as Paddy
- Paul Trahair as Young Detective
- Peter Paulson as 'Long' Harry Slater
- David Scott as 'Bunny' Whiting
- Jenni Caffin as Tart with Squizzy
- Jonathan Sweet as Snowy's mate

== Production ==
Writer Roger Simpson had been researching the period since he helped adapt Power Without Glory (1976). The filmmakers also used research done by Nigel Buesst for his film on Squizzy Taylor.

The film was shot on location in Melbourne. Its critical and commercial response was limited.

== Home media ==
Squizzy Taylor was released on DVD with a new transfer by Umbrella Entertainment in July 2007. The DVD is compatible with all region codes and includes special features such as the theatrical trailer and a featurette titled The Rise and Fall of Squizzy Taylor.

On 11 November 2012 the film was made available on Umbrella Entertainment Streaming Services.

=== DVD Releases ===
Title	Format	Ep #	Discs	Release date	Special features	Distributors
Squizzy Taylor	DVD	Film	01	July 2007	Theatrical Trailer The Rise and Fall of Squizzy Taylor	Umbrella Entertainment

=== Online Streaming ===
Title	Release date	Special features	Distributors
Squizzy Taylor	July 2007 2019	Theatrical Trailer The Rise and Fall of Squizzy Taylor Special Features not available on Amazon Prime	Umbrella Entertainment Amazon Prime

== See also ==
- Cinema of Australia
