= Squizzy Taylor =

Australian gangster

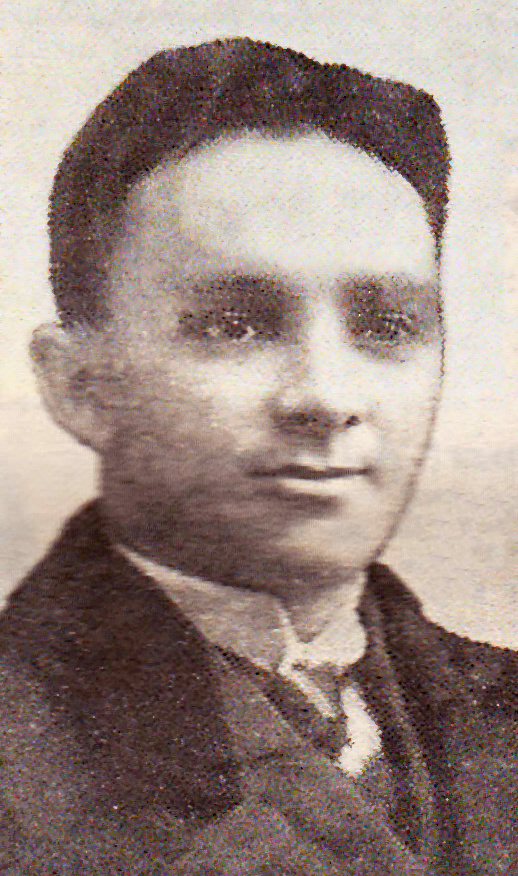
- Born: Joseph Theodore Leslie Taylor; 29 June 1888; Brighton, Colony of Victoria
- Died: 27 October 1927 (aged 39); Fitzroy, Victoria, Australia
- Cause of death: Gunshot
- Other names: Leslie Grout, Michael McGee, David Donoghue, The Turk
- Occupation: Criminal
- Spouse(s): Irene Lorna Kelly (m. 1920; div. 1924) Ida Muriel Pender (m. 1924)
- Children: June Lorraine Taylor; Lesley Taylor; Patricia Gloria Taylor

Joseph Theodore Leslie "Squizzy" Taylor (29 June 1888 – 27 October 1927) was an Australian gangster from Melbourne. He appeared repeatedly and sometimes prominently in Melbourne news media because of suspicions, formal accusations and some convictions related to a 1919 gang war, to his absconding from bail and hiding from the police in 1921–22, and to his involvement in a robbery where a bank manager was murdered in 1923.

Taylor enjoyed a fearsome reputation in 1920s Melbourne. A "spiv", described as the Australian equivalent of the 'American bootleggers', his crimes ranged from pickpocketing, assault and shopbreaking to armed robbery and murder. He also derived income from sly-grog selling, two-up schools, illegal bookmaking, extortion, prostitution and, in his later years, is believed by some to have moved into cocaine dealing.

== Early life ==
Born in Brighton, Victoria, on 29 June 1888, Taylor was the second youngest child of Benjamin Isaiah Taylor, coachmaker, and Rosina Taylor (née Jones). The family struggled financially and, after the family coachmaking business was sold by creditors in 1893, they moved to the inner-Melbourne working-class suburb of Richmond.

With the death of his father in 1901, the 13-year old Taylor began working in the stables of a horse trainer and then as a jockey in Melbourne's inner-city pony circuit.

Taylor soon started to get into trouble with the police and in May 1905 at the age of 16 was arrested for insulting behaviour. He was discharged without conviction by the local magistrates, but this was the first of many court appearances. His first criminal conviction was recorded in March 1906 at the age of 17 when he was sentenced to 21 days imprisonment for the theft of a "fly front grey Melton cloth overcoat".

=== Personal names ===
Although given the names "Joseph Leslie Theodore" by his parents, Taylor preferred to use the name "Leslie". One opinion claims that as a youth, Taylor became known by the nickname "Squizzy" because of an ulcerated, droopy left eyelid. This opinion isn't shared in Squizzy - The Biography, which claims that family sources interviewed by the author state that Leslie's older brother, Claude Taylor, was the original "Squizzy" Taylor. Linking the word "Squizz", which held a crude connotation to urinating at the time, to Claude being a short person, and a "little shit", the name was passed down to Leslie after a brief time of them both being referred to as Big Squizz and Little Squizz, before Claude left Victoria around 1912-14, and the name sticking with brother Leslie.

== Career ==
His first prison sentence behind him, Taylor became part of a larrikin 'push' (or gang) that roamed the streets looking for trouble. His early convictions included theft, assault, inciting to resist arrest, offensive language, throwing missiles and vagrancy.

Under the alias "Michael McGee", he was convicted and sentenced to two years imprisonment for pickpocketing the watch and chain of an unsuspecting punter at the Ballarat races in January 1908. After his release from prison Taylor continued to pickpocket, regularly moving from one place to another to avoid detection by the police. He was convicted of pickpocketing in Kapunda, South Australia, in January 1911 and under the alias "David Donoghue" in Christchurch, New Zealand, in November 1912.

Taylor's first wife was Dolly Gray, although it is unclear whether they were ever legally married. Dolly was more than just a girlfriend and wife—she is believed to have played an active role in some of Taylor's crimes, such as his schemes to decoy and extort money from married men.

=== Robbery and murder of Arthur Trotter (1913) ===
Arthur Trotter, a commercial traveller from MacRobertson's confectioners, was robbed of £200 and murdered in front of his wife and five-year-old son at his home in Fitzroy, Victoria, in January 1913. Harold "Bush" Thompson, a criminal associate of Taylor's, was arrested and tried for the murder but found not guilty. The police believed that Taylor was Thompson's accomplice in the armed robbery and murder, although no direct evidence could be obtained against him.

Thompson and Taylor were arrested for loitering at the Flemington racecourse with intent to commit a felony in July 1914. Taylor, alias "Leslie Grout", was sentenced to nine months' imprisonment with hard labour. While Taylor was in Melbourne Gaol, his wife Dolly supported herself by operating a brothel at her house in Little Lonsdale Street, Melbourne. One night in December 1914 she was admitted to hospital with a bullet wound in her head, received under mysterious circumstances. Although her condition was described as serious, she recovered from her injuries.

=== Murder of William Haines (1916) ===
In 1916 Taylor and John Williamson were tried and acquitted of the murder of William Patrick Haines, a 21-year-old chauffeur employed by the Globe Motor & Taxi Company. On the evening of 28 February 1916, a man calling himself Lestrange had telephoned the taxi company to order a car for the following day to take him to Eltham, Victoria. Haines, who was dispatched to drive the customer, was found late on 29 February 1916, shot dead on the floor of his car at the junction of Bulleen and Templestowe Roads, Heidelberg. The police believed that Taylor and Williamson had intended to rob a bank manager who was taking bank money from one branch to another. The police found that a grave had recently been dug near Clayton, several miles away, in which they believed the body of the bank manager was to be buried. Haines had apparently refused to co-operate so was murdered and the armed robbery was aborted.

While the murder charge failed, Taylor was sentenced to imprisonment for twelve months on a charge of vagrancy and one month for obstructing the police in the execution of their duty.

Taylor figured in the "Fitzroy Vendetta", a violent feud between rival criminal pushes that lasted for several months in 1919. One push, from Richmond, was headed by Taylor and the "two-up king" Henry Stokes, while the other one was based in Fitzroy and included Edward "Ted" Whiting, Henry "Long Harry" Slater and Frederick Thorpe.

The feud had its origins in a carefully planned robbery of £1,435 worth of diamond rings from Kilpatrick & Co, a Collins Street jewellers, in June 1918. The robbery, which Taylor is credited by some with orchestrating, was carried out by members of the Richmond and Fitzroy pushes.

When three of their members were arrested and faced trial over the robbery, the Fitzroy push became suspicious that someone from Richmond had tipped off the police and suspicions were raised further when Stokes, a member of the Richmond push, gave evidence for the prosecution in exchange for the police withdrawing charges against him. The two men were found not guilty, but that was not the end of the matter. Outside court after the trial, angry words were exchanged by the opposing factions and both Stokes and Taylor were struck by punches.

To add to the tensions, some members of the Fitzroy push were dissatisfied with the division of the proceeds from the Kilpatricks robbery. The final catalyst for the vendetta came some months after the robbery when Taylor's common law wife, Dolly, was drugged at an underworld party in Fitzroy, maltreated and robbed of £200 of jewellery that she was wearing. Some of the other guests considered the jewellery was part of the proceeds from the Kilpatrick's robbery and thus rightly belonged to them.

The Richmond push, led by Taylor, retaliated against those responsible for taking Dolly's jewellery. One of the first men targeted was Whiting, who was shot six times in the head when gunmen invaded his home in Webb Street, Fitzroy, late one night in February 1919. The newspapers reported that the life of Whiting, a former boxer, was only saved by his "exceptionally thick skull". More attacks and counter-attacks followed. The victims never sought the help of the police and, when they were so seriously injured that the police could interview them, they maintained an obstinate silence about the identity of the perpetrators.

The violence peaked in May 1919. Within a space of days, a Richmond gang member was shot seven times, a man was brutally beaten by members of the Fitzroy push, and shots were again fired at Whiting and into the house of another Fitzroy gang member. A few days later there was a violent confrontation between Stokes and Slater in Little Collins Street, Melbourne, which ended in Slater's admission to hospital with five bullet wounds to his body and Stokes under arrest for attempted murder. Stokes claimed he shot Slater in self-defence and when tried was found not guilty.

Taylor was arrested over a shooting incident in Fitzroy in August 1919. The police had seen him jumping into a moving car immediately after shots were fired into a "sly grog" shop in Fleet Street, Fitzroy, injuring a woman and two men. Taylor was initially convicted of loitering with intent to commit a felony and sentenced to 18 months imprisonment, however the conviction was overturned on appeal due to a lack of evidence.

By late 1919 the feud had died down. Whiting was in prison serving a nine-month sentence for occupying a house frequented by reputed thieves, while Slater and Thorpe had left for interstate. In September 1919 before leaving Melbourne, Thorpe was seen throwing a home-made bomb at the house of a police detective involved in the investigation of the vendetta shootings and the Kilpatricks robbery. Thorpe was subsequently arrested in Sydney and, after his return to Melbourne, sentenced to five years' imprisonment for the bombing and declared a habitual criminal to be detained at the Governor's pleasure.

=== Marriages ===
The Fitzroy Vendetta also marked the end of Taylor's relationship with his common-law wife, Dolly. By September 1919, Taylor had begun some form of relationship with a seventeen year old waitress, Irene Lorna Kelly. The couple were married under the rites of the Anglican Church in Fitzroy on 19 May 1920, and soon afterwards Dolly left Melbourne and moved to Adelaide. Shortly after the marriage Kelly gave birth to a daughter, June Loraine Taylor, who was born in Malvern East on 5 June 1920. The infant June died at around seven months of age in Kensington on 9 January 1921.

The couples' second daughter, Lesley Taylor, was born in St Kilda on 6 October 1922. The birth of another child did not help the couples' already strained marriage and Taylor ceased cohabitation with Kelly whilst he was in hiding in late 1922. Kelly returned to her parents' home with the infant Leslie and petitioned her husband for divorce on 31 July 1923 on the grounds of desertion and adultery, citing Taylor's extramarital affair with Ida Muriel "Babe" Pender. When asked about his marriage Taylor was quoted as saying, "She [Lorna] is only a fair weather friend, I am going to stick to Ida". Lorna was granted a decree nisi in February 1924 and the order nisi was made absolute in April 1924. Kelly was granted full custody of Leslie and she later sued Taylor for alimony to support their child's upkeep.

Taylor married Pender in Fitzroy on 23 May 1924. The couple also had a daughter, Gloria Patricia Taylor, born in Prahan on 15 February 1924.

=== In hiding (1921–1922) ===
Taylor was believed responsible for a series of burglaries throughout 1920 and into 1921. He was unsuccessfully prosecuted over the theft of £323 from the Thornbury branch of the Commercial Bank in February 1921, but otherwise his activities went on unimpeded by the police. His luck finally ran out in June 1921 when one night he was caught seemingly red-handed in a bonded warehouse in King Street, Melbourne. He was committed to stand trial for breaking and entering the warehouse and released on bail of £600. However, when Taylor's trial date arrived, he failed to appear at court and the bail money was forfeited. For more than a year the police searched for Taylor without success.

At the time Taylor absconded from bail, tensions were again rising in Fitzroy. Within days of his disappearance, Taylor's authority was openly challenged by Fitzroy gunman, Joseph Lennox Cotter, who riddled the door of Taylor's Bourke Street gambling club with bullets and shot the barman in the leg in crowded Bourke Street. Some weeks later Cotter fought one of Taylor's men at the Ascot races and the violence continued until, in October 1921, Cotter shot and killed John Thomas 'Fivo' Olson in Regent Street, Fitzroy. Cotter claimed he acted in self-defence in shooting Olson, whom he said was part of mob who had come to Fitzroy a few days before to shoot him. Cotter was found not guilty of Olson's murder.

The police came close to catching Taylor in March 1922, when he and two other men were spotted fleeing from a women's clothing shop in Elsternwick carrying bundles of stolen goods. The three men sped away in a car in which a driver and Taylor's girlfriend, Pender, had been waiting. A series of police raids located Taylor's two accomplices, Pender and the driver, but not Taylor. The police did, however, find some of his personal belongings, including clothes, photographs and a scrapbook of newspaper cuttings. Pender gave the police a witness statement and was rushed away to a safe location, however soon she too disappeared. Taylor's two accomplices and the driver were charged with housebreaking but, without Pender's evidence, the prosecutions failed.

Posters for the arrest of Taylor and Pender were circulated to all police stations across Victoria. Pender was arrested by police in July 1922 after she was spotted window shopping in Flinders Street, Melbourne.

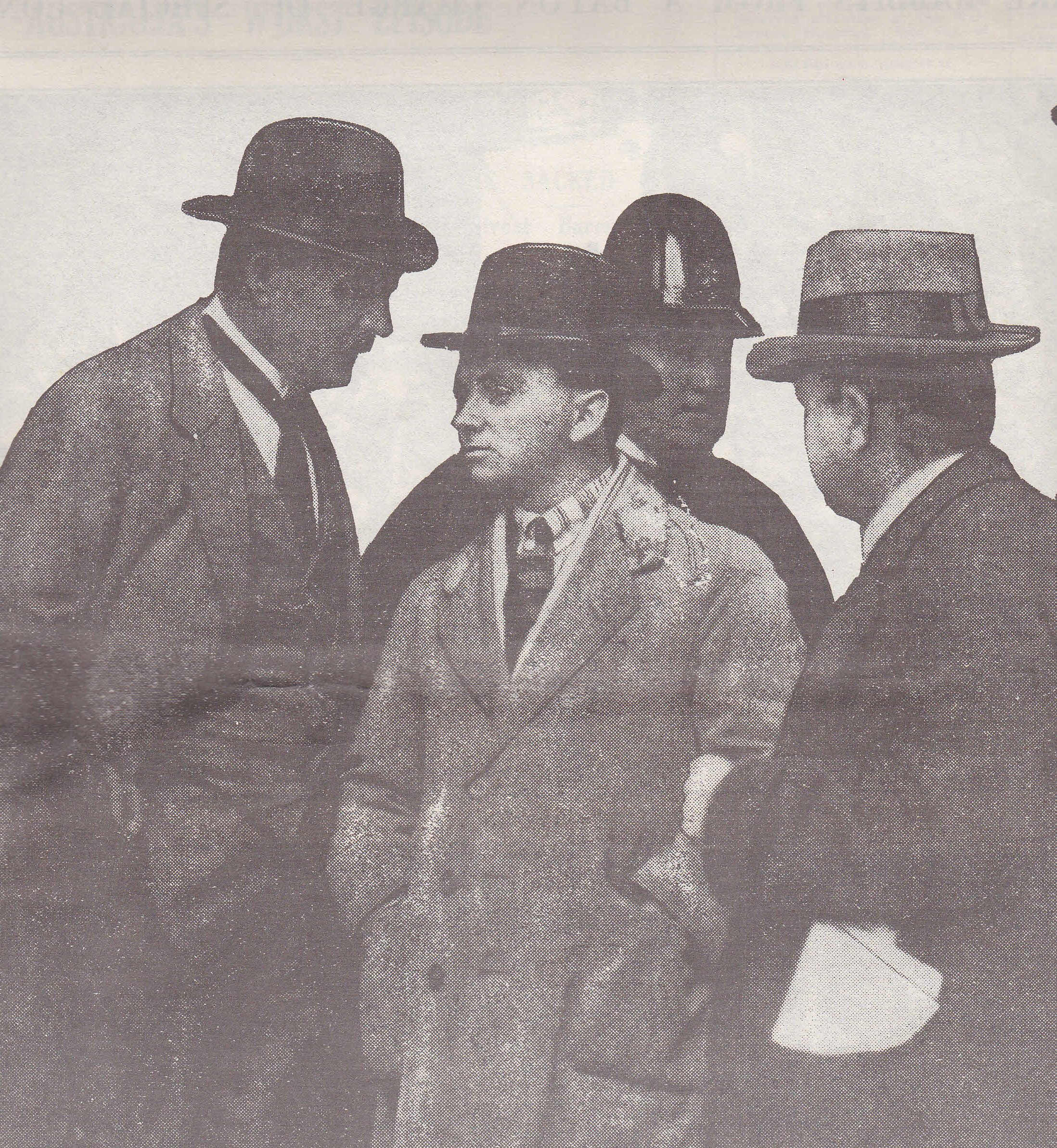
Squizzy Taylor surrenders to the police in September 1922

While in hiding, Taylor wrote letters to the Herald newspaper saying he would give himself up when he was ready. The police were sceptical about Taylor's promises, however in September 1922 he kept his word and surrendered to the police. He told the incredulous police detectives that he spent most of his time in a flat in East Melbourne and that he had often come out of hiding in disguise, sometimes dressed as a woman but more often as a schoolboy, which was convincing due to his small stature.

Taylor was again committed for trial on the charge of breaking into the warehouse and released on bail. On the evening before the trial, three shots were fired at Taylor as he was stepping out of a car in Bourke Street, Melbourne. Taylor was wounded once in the right leg. Cotter was arrested and charged with shooting at Taylor, although the charge failed due to a lack of evidence. He was sentenced to two months' prison for possessing an unregistered firearm.

On the day of his trial for warehouse breaking, Taylor limped into court on crutches. In his defence, he told a dramatic story about how an enemy of his called Lou 'the Count' Sterling (aka Louis Henri Stirling) had challenged him to fight. Taylor explained that later in the same evening he had been drinking heavily and, believing that Sterling and his men were pursuing him, he had hidden in the warehouse which was already unlocked. The jury failed to agree, so a second trial was held. At the re-trial Taylor was found not guilty.

=== Glenferrie robbery and murder of Thomas Berriman (1923) ===
Thomas Berriman, the manager of the Hawthorn branch of the Commercial Bank, was robbed of £1,851 and fatally wounded outside Glenferrie Station, Hawthorn, in October 1923. While en route to Glenferrie Station with a small suitcase of bank money, Berriman was approached by two men, one of whom offered to carry the suitcase. When Berriman refused to hand over the suitcase, one of the men drew a revolver and shot him in the chest. The men grabbed the suitcase and, pursued by bystanders, escaped on foot to a waiting car. Berriman was admitted to hospital in a serious condition and died two weeks later.

From police photographs, witnesses identified the man who shot Berriman as Richard Buckley and his accomplice as Angus Murray, an escapee from Geelong Gaol. The police raided a house in Barkly Street, St Kilda, a few mornings after the robbery and arrested Murray, Taylor and his girlfriend, Ida Pender.

The police believed that Taylor was the organiser of the robbery. He was initially charged with being the occupier of a house frequented by thieves and harbouring the escaped prisoner Murray.

Murray was charged with escaping from Geelong Gaol and with the robbery and wounding of Berriman. Berriman then died, and therefore the charges against Murray were upgraded to murder. Taylor was charged as an accessory.

The police were unable to locate Buckley despite numerous raids, an appeal for public assistance and the offer of a £500 reward. The inquest into the death of Berriman proceeded in Buckley's absence and the coroner returned the verdict of wilful murder, with Buckley and Murray as the principals and Taylor as an accessory.

After almost two months of remands in custody, Taylor was granted bail and soon began to intimidate key witnesses and devising a plan to rescue Murray from prison. The rescue plans involved the attempted bribery of a prison warder and Murray climbing over the prison wall with a rope made from towels. After the plans came to the knowledge of prison authorities, Taylor and four others were charged with conspiring to assist Murray to escape from Melbourne Gaol.

Murray was tried and convicted of the murder of Berriman and sentenced to death, even though it was Buckley who fired the fatal shot. He unsuccessfully appealed to the Court of Criminal Appeal and was refused leave to appeal to the High Court of Australia. The Trades Hall Council led a spirited campaign for a commutation of Murray's death sentence. Deputations were sent to the Attorney General and Premier, a petition with 70,000 signatories was sent to the Governor and public meetings were held to protest against Murray's pending execution. Efforts to obtain a reprieve failed, and Murray was executed on 14 April 1924 at Melbourne Gaol, with 2,000 protesters demonstrating outside.

The charges that Taylor was an accessory to the murder of Berriman were withdrawn; however, he still faced charges of conspiring to rescue Murray from prison, harboring Murray, and of occupying a house frequented by thieves. Taylor was found not guilty of the conspiracy charge. Three trials were held on the charge of harbouring Murray; at the first and second trials, the jury failed to reach a unanimous verdict and at the third trial he was acquitted.

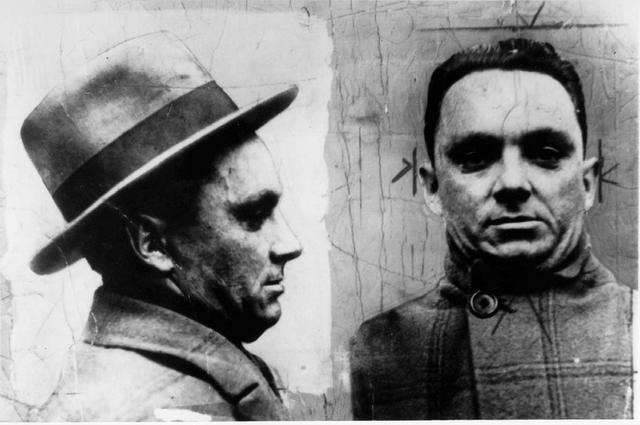
Squizzy Taylor on his release from Pentridge Prison in December 1924

Taylor was convicted of the less serious charge of being the occupier of a house frequented by thieves and sentenced to six months' prison in June 1924. He was also ordered to show cause why he should not be imprisoned indefinitely under the Indeterminate Sentences Act; however, the Supreme Court declined to order an indeterminate sentence, concluding that Taylor's criminal record was not sufficiently serious to warrant one. Taylor was released from Pentridge Prison in December 1924.

The police were relentless in their search for Buckley. Almost seven years after the murder of Berriman, the police traced him to a house in Moonee Ponds, Victoria, where he was arrested in October 1930. Rarely venturing outside the house where he lived with his great granddaughter, the ageing Buckley had grown a beard to change his appearance. Finally brought to trial, Buckley was convicted of Berriman's murder and sentenced to death, although this was soon commuted to life imprisonment. In 1946, 83-year-old Buckley was released from prison on compassionate grounds—he was dying and his family did not wish him to die in prison.

== Death ==
=== Fatal gunfight ===
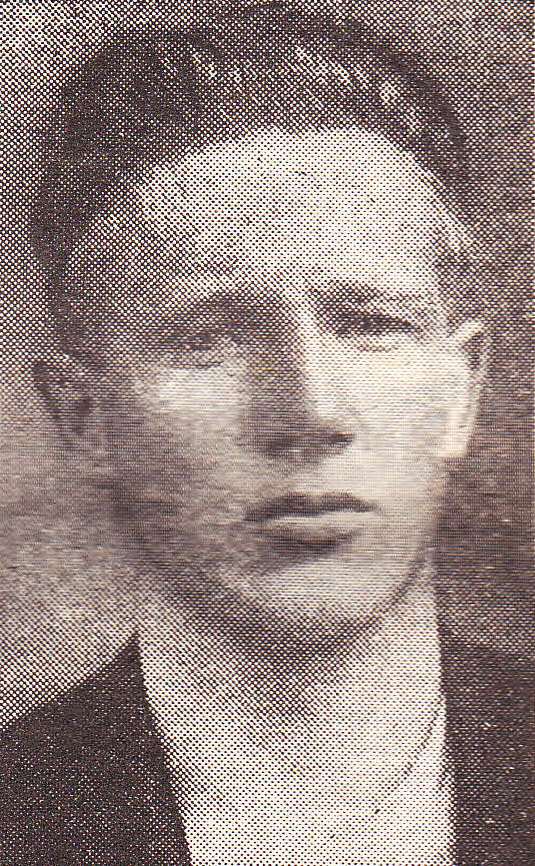
John "Snowy" Cutmore

Taylor was wounded in a gunfight with a rival gangster, John "Snowy" Cutmore, at a house in Barkly Street, Carlton, and died at St Vincent's Hospital, Fitzroy, on 27 October 1927. Cutmore, a standover man associated with the Razor Gang of Sydney, was also fatally wounded. Cutmore was an old foe of Taylor's. The animosity dated back to the Fitzroy Vendetta in 1919 when Cutmore was a member of the rival Fitzroy gang. Well known to the police as a violent criminal, Cutmore had a string of convictions in Victoria and NSW for assault, stealing and resisting arrest. In 1927 Cutmore was living in Sydney, then the scene of a 'razor gang war' between opposing factions of the Sydney underworld. Cutmore joined standover man Norman Bruhn, also originally from Melbourne, in a notorious razor gang who stole the illicit gains of their underworld peers, knowing their crimes would never be reported to the police. Bruhn was murdered in the Sydney suburb of Darlinghurst in June 1927.

Cutmore returned to Melbourne with his wife in October 1927 and began staying at his mother's house in Barkly Street, Carlton. Within a few days of his arrival, Cutmore was confined to bed with a severe bout of influenza. Taylor, hearing of Cutmore's return from Sydney, set out to find him. On the evening of 27 October 1927, Taylor and two men hailed a taxi to take them to Carlton. They stopped at several Carlton hotels in search of Cutmore and, finally, Taylor told the driver to take them to Barkly Street, Carlton.

In Barkly Street, Taylor and the two men got out of the taxi and headed for Cutmore's house. Taylor and one of his companions let themselves into the house and went to the room where Cutmore was lying ill in bed. Words were exchanged by the men, followed by a series of gunshots in quick succession. Cutmore, still lying in bed, was fatally wounded. His mother, who rushed to the room after hearing the shooting, was also wounded in the shoulder. Taylor was shot in his right side below the ribs. He staggered outside towards the waiting taxi, while one of his companions fled out the back door of the house. Taylor was helped into the taxi and taken to St Vincent's Hospital. When stuck in traffic on the way to the hospital, Taylor's other companion jumped from the taxi and ran off. Taylor was unconscious by the time he arrived at the casualty ward and died soon afterwards.

Taylor was buried with Anglican rites in Brighton Cemetery in a double plot with his eldest daughter, June Loraine Taylor. On the morning of the funeral, the police were needed to control a large crowd of onlookers who gathered at Taylor's house, swarming around the waiting hearse in morbid curiosity. Cutmore was buried in Coburg Cemetery.

Taylor's first wife, Lorna Kelly, remarried George Andrew Davis in Kensington on 22 December 1927. Kelly died in Frankston in 1980.

Taylor’s widow, Ida Pender, remarried George Thomas Lewin in Richmond on 29 September 1928. The Australian press incorrectly reported that Pender had remarried a Mick Powell. Pender and Lewin divorced in 1932. She then re-married Francesco Antonio Labattaglia in 1933. Pender died in Fitzroy on 22 April 1971. Taylor’s daughter by Pender, Patsy, married George Charles Forbes in Richmond in 1962. She died in South Australia in 2003.

=== Inquest ===
Police enquiries into the death of Taylor and Cutmore led to the arrest of four men. On the day after the shooting Roy Travers, an associate of Cutmore, was detained at Albury on a Sydney-bound train. The following day, the police intercepted three other men, Thomas Kelly, his brother Sidney Kelly and Norman Smith, also on their way back to Sydney. The police suspected that two of these men had accompanied Taylor to Cutmore's house on the night of the shooting. The Kelly brothers were well known to police for their role in the recent 'razor gang war' in Sydney. Thomas Kelly had just been acquitted of shooting Frank 'Razor Jack' Hayes with intent to do grievous bodily harm. Hayes together with Norman Bruhn and Cutmore, were central figures in a notorious razor gang that preyed on their peers in the Sydney underworld.

The police recovered three handguns believed to be connected with the shooting of Taylor and Cutmore. An automatic pistol was found in Taylor's pocket after he arrived at hospital and two other pistols were discovered in the vicinity of Cutmore's house, one was hidden in the cistern of a toilet in the backyard and the other was found in a right-of-way some distance away. This suggested that a third person was involved in the shooting.

A coronial inquiry was held into the deaths of Taylor and Cutmore. The coroner returned an open verdict due to a lack of evidence. He concluded that "... Cutmore died from bullet wounds in the heart and lungs. There is not sufficient evidence to say who fired the shots ... Taylor died from a bullet wound in the liver. There is not sufficient evidence to determine who fired the shot." Even though the coroner had heard forensic evidence suggesting the pistol found in Taylor's possession was used to shoot Cutmore and the pistol used by Cutmore had fired the fatal shot at Taylor, there remained a number of unanswered questions. There was no evidence of the motive for the shooting, the identity of the third person involved or explaining the discovery of Cutmore's pistol in a right-of-way some distance from the scene of the shooting. The four arrested men were discharged without conviction.

=== Theories ===
Several theories soon emerged about the deaths of Taylor and Cutmore. An early police theory was that the enmity between the two men resulted from jealousy over a woman. Other police enquiries suggested the shooting was a sequel to the murder of Norman Bruhn by an unidentified assailant in Sydney four months earlier.

The Melbourne Truth newspaper printed multiple theories on the Taylor-Cutmore shooting. One was that the shooting was an accident and Taylor, who was more bravado than bite, had only intended to "put the wind up" Cutmore not realising that he was armed. Another theory was that an unknown third person had lured Taylor and Cutmore to the Barkly Street house and murdered one or both of them. Yet another theory was that Taylor murdered Cutmore as payback for the death of Norman Bruhn. It reported that the police believed Cutmore had murdered Bruhn because he had robbed a friend of his.

Over the years, more theories have surfaced including:

- Cutmore's mother, Bridget Cutmore, murdered Taylor after he fatally wounded her son.
- Taylor's former criminal associate Henry Stokes organised the murder of Taylor, clearing the way for him to take control of the Melbourne underworld.
- Prominent Melbourne businessman and Australian Labor Party power-broker John Wren ordered the death of Taylor because he had supposedly threatened to shoot Wren. Perpetuated by Frank Hardy's controversial 1950 novel, Power Without Glory, this theory was strongly disputed by some, including veteran journalist Hugh Buggy who maintained that Wren was not involved in Taylor's death. Buggy wrote that the fatal confrontation between Taylor and Cutmore was the product of Cutmore celebrating his arrival back in Melbourne by smashing up a St Kilda beerhouse and punching its female proprietor.
- Another theory is that Joseph Lennox Cotter (aka "Brownie" Cotter) followed Squizzy to Cutmore's house on that fatal day to finally complete the hit, that he had failed to complete previously. Rumours suggest that he may have been paid by Stokes or by corrupt police for the job.

While there is a wealth of often speculative theories, there has never been a decisive explanation of what happened inside the Barkly Street house on 27 October 1927 or the reason for the shootings. The only consensus is that the official version of events is incomplete and that an unidentified third person was present at the fatal gunfight.

== Documentary ==
In 1969, a documentary about Taylor was released. The Rise and Fall of Squizzy Taylor, directed by Nigel Buesst, was privately funded and screened at the Carlton Cinema in Melbourne and Union Theatre in Sydney. It was later screened on Channel Nine on television.

== Cultural references ==
In Frank Hardy's 1950 novel Power Without Glory, Taylor is portrayed as the character Snoopy Tanner. A fictionalised account of the life of Melbourne businessman and Australian Labor Party power-broker John Wren, Power Without Glory depicted Taylor as an associate of Wren and suggested that, together with John Jackson, Taylor was involved in the 1915 Melbourne Trades Hall burglary in which a Constable David McGrath was shot and killed. While some people continue to suspect Taylor's involvement in the Trades Hall burglary, there is no known evidence of this or an association between Taylor and Wren. In the 1976 ABC-TV adaptation the character of Snoopy Tanner was played by Graeme Blundell.

In 1976 Frank Howson and Barry Ferrier wrote an opera based on Taylor's life, titled Squizzy, which was broadcast by ABC Radio and 3CR and received much media attention. The title role was performed by Men At Work's Colin Hay. A major stage production was in the early stages of being mounted, to be directed by Nigel Triffitt of Tap Dogs fame, when a film version by a rival producer was announced, causing the stage production to fall over. The film, titled Squizzy Taylor with Jacki Weaver and David Atkins, loosely based on Taylor's life, was released in 1982 but flopped with critics and public alike.

Taylor is the subject of Touch The Black: The Life and Death of Squizzy Taylor, a fictional account of his life and death by Melbourne poet and writer Chris Grierson.

Taylor's life was also the subject of the musical play Squizzy, featuring songs by Faye Bendrups and a script by acclaimed Australian playwright Barry Dickins. It premiered at La Mama Theatre on 10 June 2010, and ran for 15 shows. It was later revived in 2010 for a production that was staged at the Trades Hall Ballroom in Melbourne, running from 17 to 27 November.

The 2005 book Runner by Robert Newton, follows a fictional teenager who is hired as a runner for Taylor.

Such was the infamy of the name association that Victorian teachers with the same surname were inevitably nicknamed Squizzy by their pupils more than four decades after his death.

== Underbelly television series ==
Taylor was featured in the Australian series Underbelly: Razor, a 13-part series covering the Razor war which occurred in Sydney during the twenties and thirties, which was broadcast in 2011. In the fourth season of the Australian true crime series, Taylor was portrayed by actor Justin Rosniak. The sixth season, Underbelly: Squizzy, was based on his life. The eight-part series aired on the Nine Network (as with the previous series of Underbelly), with actor Jared Daperis replacing Rosniak in the title role.
