= Tough Nuts: Australia's Hardest Criminals =

Australian documentary television series

- Written by: Peter Hoysted
- Presented by: Tara Moss
- Country of origin: Australia
- Original language: English
- No. of seasons: 2
- No. of episodes: 16

Production
- Executive producer: Bryan Cockerill
- Producer: Peter Hoysted
- Running time: 60 minutes
- Production company: The Full Box

Original release
- Network: Foxtel Crime + Investigation
- Release: 24 June 2010 – 26 January 2012

Tough Nuts: Australia's Hardest Criminals is an Australian documentary television series narrated by Tara Moss. The series profiles a different Australian criminal in each episode from their childhood through to adulthood. The series features dramatised reconstructions of their most notorious crimes and interviews with persons who knew the criminals including former police officers, convicted criminals and their friends, together with forensic psychologists opinions.

The series was created and produced by the production company The Full Box and first screened on the Crime and Investigation Network in June 2010. A second season was screened in 2011. The series has been sold internationally.

Tough Nuts was nominated for Most Outstanding Documentary at the 2011 ASTRA awards.

The Nine Network bought the two seasons and re-branded the series as Australian Crime Stories which was broadcast in 2016 and 2017.

The Seven Network released the original series via video on demand on 7plus in 2019.

== Episodes ==
=== Season 1 (2010) ===
No.	Title	Original release date
1	"Chris Flannery – Rentakill Incorporated"	24 June 2010
2	"Chow Hayes – A Killers's Eyes"	29 July 2010
3	"Alphonse Gangitano – Saturday Night Gangster"	26 August 2010
4	"Dennis Allen – Mr Death Is Dead"	30 September 2010
5	"Russell ‘Mad Dog’ Cox – The Man No Jail Could Hold"	28 October 2010
6	"Michael Sayers – The Ringer Gets Rung"	25 November 2010
7	"Raymond ‘Ray Chuck’ Bennett – Criminal Mastermind"	30 December 2010
8	"Lenny McPherson – Mr Big"	27 January 2011

=== Season 2 (2011) ===
No.	Title	Original release date
1	"Nikolai Radev - The Invader"	29 June 2011
2	"Stan Smith - The Enforcer"	28 July 2011
3	"Ray Denning - The Runner"	25 August 2011
4	"Tilly Devine - Madam Razor"	27 September 2011
5	"Jockey Smith - Public Enemy Number One"	27 October 2011
6	"Dino Dibra - The Sunshine Boy"	24 November 2011
7	"Stewart John Regan – The Magician"	29 December 2011
8	"George Freeman – The King Of Sydney"	26 January 2012
