= Akai Ito =

Akai Ito may refer to:

- Akai Ito (horse), a racehorse
- Akai Ito (video game), a Japanese video game
- Akai Ito (TV series), a 2008–2009 Japanese television drama
- "Akai Ito" (song), a 2008 song by Yui Aragaki

== See also ==
- The Red Thread (disambiguation)
- Red string (disambiguation)
