= Racing identity =

Euphemism

Racing identity, expanded to prominent or colourful racing identity, is a euphemism used by journalists (particularly in Sydney, Australia) for a person who is believed to be involved in criminal activity, and who frequents horse or dog racing venues or is involved in some aspect of the racing industry.

Examples:

- "Colourful funeral for colourful racing identity Jack Sparrow"
- "Horse racing identity charged with importing 50kg of cocaine"

The term gained wide currency in the Australian media in the late 20th century due to a combination of legal and constitutional factors, including:

- the punitive nature of Australian state defamation laws which, like their English models, tend to be heavily biased towards the plaintiff
- the absence of explicit freedom of speech provisions in the Australian Constitution and
- the lack in Australian law of any legal provision or precedent which makes truth an absolute defence in defamation cases.

The association between organised crime and racing (especially horse racing) in Australia developed largely because of the conservative nature of Australian law and government in regard to gambling. In the decades before the recent liberalisation of the laws governing poker machines, casinos and other forms of gambling, betting on horse and greyhound racing was the only legal outlet for gambling in Australia apart from government-run lotteries and scratch tickets.

As a result, horse racing (and to a lesser extent dog racing) provided one of the few legitimate means by which those involved in organised crime could easily launder money earned from their illegal enterprises. Because betting with on-track bookmakers could not be easily scrutinised by law enforcement or tax authorities, it was relatively easy for such people to claim that any large sums of money they might possess had been won on a lucky bet, and it was extremely difficult for the authorities to prove otherwise.

Former New South Wales Premier Robert Askin was widely reputed to have been at the centre of an extensive network of organised crime and official corruption, and allegedly received tens of thousands of dollars each month in bribes from major Sydney underworld figures. Although official inquiries uncovered assets far in excess of what he could have reasonably earned through investments and stock trading, Askin always claimed that his wealth was because he was a shrewd gambler. Following his death the Australian Tax Office audited his estate and determined it was made up of a significant amount of unknown or undisclosed sources, although his death meant no criminal action could be taken. Articles and books were written on the subject by journalists including David Hickie.

Likewise, because on-track betting transactions could not be monitored as they could in the government-run betting agencies (e.g. the Totalisator Agency Board), major racecourses became favoured meeting places for many of the people who are now generally accepted to have been leading figures in Australian organised crime, such as George Freeman, Perc Galea and Lenny McPherson.
