= Bill Jenkings =

Australian journalist

- Born: William Charles Jenkings; 1915
- Died: 12 May 1996 (aged 80–81)
- Occupations: Writer, newspaper reporter
- Known for: Criminal journalism
- Notable work: Books – Crime Reporter, As Crime Goes By

William Charles Jenkings (1915 – 12 May 1996) was an Australian writer, newspaper reporter, and a well known Bondi Beach personality.

== Career ==
Jenkings was a news and crime reporter for the Sydney newspaper The Daily Mirror, having joined the paper in 1944. The Daily Mirror was then owned by Ezra Norton and was later owned by Rupert Murdoch's News Ltd. Jenkings worked as a reporter there until his retirement in 1991. Jenkings made and maintained legendary contacts both in the underworld and the police force, and was regarded as the foremost crime reporter in Sydney for over 50 years. He covered high-profile cases during the 1950s and 1960s, including the Graeme Thorne kidnapping, the Bogle-Chandler case, and the Wanda Beach Murders. One of his sources, Detective Ray "Gunner" Kelly, benefited greatly from the publicity, becoming one of Australia's best-known policemen.

Jenkings was also unabashed at his support for several of the men he'd met in his working life. He had known Rupert Murdoch when Murdoch controlled The Daily Mirror, and Jenkings insisted that he was "a great boss". He also refused to believe allegations about the involvement of Sydney policemen Ray Kelly, Fred Krahe and Frank Farrell in corrupt activities, saying that he had also known them personally.

== Author ==
Jenkings published two books. The first, Crime Reporter, was a pulp-paperback about some of his highest-profile reporting cases. His second, As Crime Goes By.., covered his life story, which was mostly ghost-written for him just after he retired, and became a best-seller. The book featured interesting accounts of the lives of many famous Sydney criminals such as Kate Leigh, Tilly Devine, John 'Chow' Hayes, William 'Joey' Hollebone, Nellie Cameron, "Pretty" Dulcie Markham, Robert "Pretty Boy" Walker, Richard "Dick" Reilly, "Greyhound" Charlie Bourke, Stewart John Regan and Darcy Dugan. In it he suggested that he knew the solutions to the Bogle-Chandler and Wanda Beach cases, although the suspect he named for the latter commenced legal action against Jenkings for the allegation. This litigation was not finalised, and it ceased with Jenkings' death.

== Personal life ==
Jenkings married Noreen Cecilia Simpson at St. Anne's Catholic Church, Bondi, New South Wales, on 30 March 1940. He lived with his family for most of his life in Bondi, and was known to many people as "Bondi" Bill Jenkings, and was a life member of the Bondi Surf Lifesaving Club. He died on 12 May 1996, was cremated at the Eastern Suburbs Memorial Park at Botany, and was survived by his wife and four children.
