= Marra Developments Ltd v BW Rofe Pty Ltd =

- Court: NSW Court of Appeal
- Decided: 12 December 1977
- Citation: [1977] 2 NSWLR 616; 3 ACLR 185

Case history
- Prior action: Marra Developments Ltd v BW Rofe Pty Ltd [1977] 1 NSWLR 162; 2 ACLR 298
- Appealed from: Supreme Court of NSW

Court membership
- Judges sitting: Moffitt P Hutley and Mahoney JJA

Marra Developments Ltd v BW Rofe Pty Ltd, is a NSW Court of Appeal case on Australian company law, and is an authority for the proposition that an interim dividend was revocable until the dividend was paid, a declared final dividend was a debt payable by the company to the shareholder from the date stipulated for payment.

BW Rofe Pty Ltd was a shareholder in Marra Developments, which had declared a dividend. When the time came for the payment of the dividend, the directors of Marra declined to make payment. Marra had profits available when it declared the dividend. However, between the declaration of the dividend and the date upon which it was to be paid, the assets of Marra were revalued. The revaluation caused a diminution in the book value of Marra's assets which wiped out the company's profit for the year.

Marra obtained a declaration from the Supreme Court that the shareholder was not entitled to payment of the dividend, and the shareholder appealed to the Court of Appeal.

The Court of Appeal, Moffitt P, Hutley and Mahoney JJA, unanimously upheld the appeal, holding that profits need only be available at the time the dividend is declared, not at the time when it is to be paid. Hutley JA held that an interim dividend was entirely provisional and anticipates the profits to be disclosed in the final accounts. In relation to a final dividend, as the dividend became payable on declaration, each shareholder became entitled to be paid the debt thereby created. Marra had argued that the subsequent events meant the dividend would not be payable out of profits. Hutley JA held that:

If from the profit and loss account ... there is sufficient to permit the declaration of the dividend, the losses between the end of the financial year in which these accounts are produced cannot be used to prevent, on legal grounds, the declaration and payment of a dividend, unless the subsequent revealed losses invalidate the accounts themselves. Any other approach makes the right of a shareholder to a dividend which has been declared entirely capricious.
