= Stan Smith (criminal) =

Australian criminal (1937–2010)

Stanley John Smith
- Born: 3 January 1937; Balmain, Sydney
- Died: 13 January 2010 (aged 73)
- Other names: Stan "The Enforcer" Smith
- Occupation: Criminal
- Known for: His role in Australia's criminal underworld

Stanley John Smith (as known as "Stan the Man") was an Australian criminal who was an important underworld figure throughout the 1960s–1980s. He was associated with other gangland heavyweights such as Lenny McPherson and George Freeman who were considered as some of the most powerful underworld figures in Australia of the late 20th Century. Stan Smith was linked to multiple shootings and murders however only spent a few months in prison for drug possession charges. Sometimes referred to as "The Enforcer", Stan had a fearsome reputation as a violent hitman who eventually progressed into a career of drug trafficking. He was also a family man and in the latter stages of his life became a devout Christian involved in church groups and ran legitimate businesses.

== Early life ==
Stan was born in Sydney, Australia on 3 January 1937. He was born into the working-class suburb of Balmain, New South Wales which at the time functioned as an industrial centre including shipbuilding and metal manufacturing. Smith left school at the age of 13 and much of his youth development occurred in reformatory schools of Gosford and Tamworth, notorious for having cultures akin to that of a prison.

By 17, he worked on the docks which involved hard manual labour and lacked the prospect of a genuine career path. At the age of 18 he married a local girl named Marylin Moss with whom he spent the rest of his life. That same year that he met Lenny McPherson who introduced Stan to the protection business. It was here that Smith begun his career of crime and violence.

== Criminal life ==
=== Close associates ===
The earliest and closest associate of Smith was that of Lenny McPherson, whereby they gained the reputation of being two of Sydney’s "hard men" through their protection of nightclubs and gambling venues, particularly in the Kings Cross area. McPherson was 16 years older than Smith and was key in exposing him to the Sydney underbelly. McPherson was an ambitious criminal who sought to "raise his status in the criminal underworld" and utilised Smith’s tough nature and tendencies towards violence in order to gain a strong foothold in the criminal world.

Smith was soon introduced to an old prison friend of Lenny McPherson, named George Freeman who had strong links in crime associated with bookmaking and other forms of gambling. Together, the three men ran an empire within the criminal underworld whereby Smith’s primary role was to sustain and grow their business through fear and intimidation, earning him the nickname of "The Enforcer".

=== Violence ===
Stan Smith’s status in the criminal world was determined by his brutality and his violence. This was a necessity in his role of the "protection" business that he ran alongside his close associates. Linked to 25 shootings and 15 murders, Smith was widely known one of Sydney’s toughest criminals of his era. Smith was never officially attributed to or arrested for these violent crimes as there was no evidence, however it was widely thought that he was connected to and likely played a significant role in them.

Smith had a reputation of having a violent sexual nature to women that refused his sexual advances, despite being married to his wife Marylin. A dancer at a venue that Smith protected said in an interview, ''if a girl sat at a table with him, she was dead. If the girl did not agree to have sex with him, he would do something like putting a leash around her ankles and hold her out of a top-storey window.'' McPherson had paid women off that had been injured by Stan in such encounters, offering to cover medical costs.

Smith was shot by Robert "Pretty Boy" Walker, in 1963 during an altercation when Smith and several associates broke into Walker’s house over an argument that had sparked over Smith’s beating of a prostitute. Robert Walker was already an enemy of Smith and his criminal luminaries as he was a rival protection racketeer who often bragged about his self-proclaimed status of being the toughest man in Sydney. Smith confronted Walker in his home and the altercation resulted in Smith being shot in the chest by Walker wielding his rifle. Later, using the alibi of Lenny McPherson’s wedding, he and his best man Stan Smith committed an act of revenge. The pair allegedly left the wedding service to track down Walker who was then gunned down near his safe-house in Randwick. This was an important event in the history of Sydney’s gangland activity as it was the first incident involving a machine gun.

Smith was also allegedly connected to the murder of another key underworld figure of Stuart John Regan alongside the notorious crime lord, Fredrick "Paddles" Anderson. The alleged plot to kill Regan was as a retaliation to his recent murder of a two-year-old child. Smith and his associates were rumoured to have done this in order to maintain principles that they upheld in the crime world that the working class and helpless people such as children were off limits.

=== Drug trafficking and gambling ===
Stanley Smith’s role of a violent enforcer in his protection and racketeering business eventually developed into organisational role. In 1966, Smith and McPherson were barred from entering Hong Kong in relation to the smuggling of gold and narcotics – something they took pride in dealing with.

Smith and Freeman began to draw a lot of attention from police as their criminal operations expanded. By forming relationships with key international figures and venturing further into the corrupt gambling scene in New South Wales, the Moffitt Royal Commission saw Freeman to be recognised by NSW police as their primary target. Closely associated to Freeman, Smith was also under police investigation as he was recorded on tape calling upon underworld figures and illegal casino operators to put up cash in order to bribe members of parliament to secure casino licences for illegal activities at the Taiping restaurant on Elizabeth Street. Later, in a Royal Commission into Drug Trafficking that Smith was involved in due to charges of drug possession, it was made apparent that Smith "unwittingly frightened politicians out of legalising casinos in New South Wales" because of his recommendation to bribe officials. The meeting where this evidence was recorded has been referred to as the "Taiping Conspiracy" as it involved communication between Parliament House and criminal underworld figures. In this period, political party independent John Hatton, who sought the legalisation of casinos in New South Wales, stated that Stanley Smith ‘is said to have replaced the so-called "Mr Big", Leonard Arthur McPherson’.

Smith’s network began to change as his criminal activity began to primarily involve the trafficking of drugs whereby he became close with international drug trafficker, Lawrence McLean. His role in drug trade developed from being a standover man to that of an organisational role whereby he ran the scene and ordered other men to do the ‘dirty work’. By the mid-1970s Smith and McLean were heavily involved in the production and trade of cannabis. Smith was arrested in March 1977 near Melbourne Airport for possession of hemp. After Smith's arrest, Freeman went to the police to enquire about bail which was paid by his employee Lynette Black who paid $20,000 in cash.

In the Woodward Commission that followed, Smith pleaded his innocence to the drug charges. In the Commission he stated "I am not involved in drug matters and these allegations are all the more hurtful to my family and myself when the fact is that my eldest son, who is twenty-one years of age, is currently serving a jail sentence for drug-related offences and has been a hopeless heroin addict for some years now. We have tried to face this problem and rehabilitate him, without success, and the allegations now being made are in the circumstances particularly hurtful." Smith was found guilty and sentenced to 15 months in prison by Justice Phillip Woodward in 1979 after being convicted for possession of amphetamines and cannabis. Despite many other allegations and arrests for a range of different crimes, this was his only stint in jail.

== Later life ==
=== Family ===
Stan Smith remained married to his childhood sweetheart, Marilyn Moss from the age of 18 until his death 54 years later. In their time together they had three sons named Stan Jr., Hayden and Peter. His eldest, Stan Jr. died of a heroin overdose at the age of 21. There were allegations that Smith was involved in the murder of his son's heroin dealer in an act of revenge. The dealer's body was repeatedly run over by a car and left to die near Narrabeen Lakes which happened shortly after Stan Jr.'s overdose.

=== Religion ===
Smith turned his life around in his later years, becoming a devout Christian in 2003 as he began to regularly attend the Evangel Bible Church at Putney as well as joining bible groups and attending to other religious gatherings. In contrast to his former life of violence and criminality, Smith would devote time to feeding underprivileged people in his area and sharing his religious beliefs. According to friends confirmed by private investigator, Rex Beaver, Stanley was running legitimate businesses as he continued to live a life of a Christian in his later years.

=== Death ===
Stan Smith died in 2010 in his Gladesville home at the age of 72 in 2010. He was survived by his wife, Marilyn and son, Hayden.
