= Gunner Kelly =

Australian police officer (1906–1977)

Raymond William Kelly MBE
- Born: 3 February 1906; Wellington, New South Wales, Australia
- Died: 11 August 1977 (aged 71); Sydney, New South Wales, Australia
- Occupation: Detective Inspector
- Employer: NSW police

Raymond William "Gunner" Kelly, MBE (3 February 1906 – 11 August 1977) was an Australian police officer who was a detective inspector with NSW Police. He became famous during his career owing to his high-profile cases and results thereof. He was later alleged to have been deeply involved in corruption and organised crime.

== Career ==
Kelly gained national fame as the head of the investigation into the notorious kidnapping and murder of Sydney schoolboy Graeme Thorne in 1960. Earlier he claimed responsibility for the capture of the notorious Sydney gangster and murderer John 'Chow' Hayes. He gained further renown in 1966 thanks to his highly publicised capture of prison escapees Ronald Ryan and Peter Walker. According to writer Tony Reeves, the biographer of Sydney crime boss Lenny McPherson, Kelly was able to capture the pair easily because they had come to McPherson seeking his help to leave the country, but McPherson then set up a bogus meeting with Ryan and Walker at Concord Hospital in Sydney and tipped off Kelly.

Kelly often leaked stories to journalist Bill Jenkings of the, now-defunct, Sydney newspaper The Daily Mirror. He retired in 1966 as the best-known and best-regarded police officer in Sydney. In March 1966, soon after his retirement, Kelly was hired for a private investigation into the disappearance of the Beaumont children by a Sydney newspaper. He flew to Adelaide, where the South Australian Police welcomed him politely. He left after only one day.

== Reputation ==
Kelly was also legendary for "verballing" alleged criminals– coercing verbal confessions from suspects for offences they may not have committed. Kelly used the practice so effectively that barrister (later Justice) Simon Isaacs nicknamed him "Verbal Kelly". Kelly acquired the "Gunner" nickname after two incidents early in his career when he drew his service revolver and fired at suspects. He also had a talent for unorthodox approaches, such as when British gangster Billy Hill sailed into Sydney with the intention of starting a new life in Australia. Kelly was detailed to ensure that he didn't land. Hill had a legal right to enter the country. Kelly met Hill in his cabin, identified himself and told Hill that if he stepped off the ship, he would return to Britain a week later in a coffin. Hill stayed on board and returned to Britain. He never tried to visit Australia again.

By the time Kelly died in 1977, his reputation had been tarnished by serious corruption allegations. Many of the allegations were canvassed in David Hickie's 1985 book The Prince and The Premier. Hickie and others have alleged that Kelly and Detective Fred Krahe were involved in the protection rackets that fed on Sydney's then illegal abortion industry. Kelly also made "no secret" of his association with figures including abortionist Dr Reginald Stuart-Jones, illegal gaming tsars Perc Galea and Joe Taylor and leading Sydney gangsters Charles "Paddles" Anderson and Lenny McPherson. Reeves quoted a former police officer who said that Kelly "ran" McPherson as an informant for many years, According to Reeves, Kelly kept the lid on numerous crimes to reward or gain influence over McPherson and others. He learned early in his career that he could exert a powerful influence over criminal activities by setting up underworld killings of criminals who could not be controlled by other means.

== Honours ==
Kelly was awarded an MBE in 1975 on the advice of controversial NSW Premier Robert Askin. By this time he was reputed to be the part-owner of an illegal casino in Gosford, New South Wales in partnership with the then NSW Police Commissioner Fred Hanson. He was later found to be one of the most corrupt police officers in Australia by the Wood Royal Commission in 1997 into police corruption, which described Kelly's involvement in the Mr. Asia organized crime syndicate.

== Death ==
Kelly died in Sydney of natural causes on 11 August 1977.
