= Fred Krahe =

Police officer and a detective from New South Wales, Australia

- Born: Frederick Claude Krahe; 6 November 1919; Sydney, New South Wales, Australia
- Died: 6 December 1981 (aged 62); Sydney, New South Wales, Australia
- Occupations: Police officer, detective sergeant

Frederick Claude Krahe (6 November 1919 – 6 December 1981) was an Australian New South Wales police officer and detective.

== Allegations of murder and corruption ==
Among the many rumours and allegations about him, Krahe is alleged to have murdered prostitute and police informant Shirley Brifman in 1972, after his corrupt relationship with her was exposed. It is believed that Brifman's whistle-blowing was the true cause for Krahe's retirement from police work later the same year; the official reason given was that Krahe was "medically unfit".

Journalist David Hickie and others have also alleged that when they were both on the New South Wales force, Krahe and Ray "Gunner" Kelly were involved in the protection rackets that fed on Sydney's then illegal abortion industry.

Detective Superintendent Donald Fergusson, Krahe's protege and one-time partner, was killed by a bullet from his own service revolver in the lavatory of his office at Sydney's Police Administration Center in Campbell Street. Fergusson was under pressure from a prostitution investigation, and was rumoured to have been interested in talking to investigators. It was widely rumoured that Fergusson was in fact murdered by Krahe.

=== Varley-Burton Car Gang corruption allegations ===
In seven months in 1971–1972, the Varley-Burton car gang stole $1.5 million in cars. The gang's chop shops began being raided in January 1972. Alan Burton disappeared on 7 February 1972. Put on trial for the murder, his partner Reg Varley claimed Fred Krahe received the majority of the $1.5 million, and killed Burton for stealing. Varley said he had been forced into the operation by police at gunpoint, and implicated dozens of CID officers in the scheme. He claimed two policemen, Krahe and Cyril Roy Edwards, were looking to give Burton 'a hiding' on 7 February for stealing $20,000. After Varley objected, Krahe kicked the one-legged man's crutch out from under him, assaulted him and took him along to pick up Burton, who was dragged out of eyesight. Then, Varley said, shots rang out, and presumably Burton was murdered.

After the longest New South Wales murder trial to that point in history, Varley was acquitted of murder by the jury, yet convicted of manslaughter. The Judge, Justice Issacs, was more than willing to acknowledge that, in his words, "One of the most disturbing features of the case was that not only the operation carried out under the nose of the motor squad but that it received the active co-operation of certain corrupt members of the police force who gave protection to the gang by being paid bribes periodically."

Justice Issacs was unwilling to believe Varley was a coerced victim on any level and sentenced him to 14 years. Varley screamed and berated the Judge as the sentence was read out, and as Varley's family tried to calm him, he was restrained by the same detective who had led the Burton investigation, Detective Sgt. RJ Douglass. Asked if he had anything to say, he launched into a 10-minute speech of incredulity at the verdict and the harsh sentence, before concluding that he had no choice but to accept it. He was paroled after six years, and steadfastly maintained his innocence. Varley's case became something of a celebrated cause even after he was released, with even noted Australian physician Dr. Bertram Wainer championing him.

John Laurence, a New South Wales Crown Prosecutor, launched an independent inquiry into the allegations in 1979. Laurence concluded that New South Wales policemen had funded and protected the operation. He named Fred Krahe and Cyril Roy Edwards in the report. The New South Wales Premier Neville Wran ordered a further inquiry. That inquiry recommended no charges be made.

Cyril Roy Edwards was murdered in 1986, on Tamarama Beach with a bullet to the head. He was under investigation for drug corruption at the time.

In August 1987, Reg Varley killed himself. He left behind a note stating: "I only hope that one day the truth comes to light about the people involved in the conspiracy to frame me," after the judge in his 1971 trial was quite willing to accept the involvement of Krahe and others in the car thefts and murder, but not Varley's innocence.

=== Allegations of involvement in the Juanita Nielsen and Donald Mackay disappearances ===
It is alleged that Krahe became a criminal for hire after leaving the police force. Investigative journalists David Hickie and Tony Reeves name Krahe as the ringleader/organiser of a gang of "heavies" employed by developer Frank Theeman, who intimidated residents and assaulted protestors during the campaign against Theeman's high-rise development in Victoria Street, Kings Cross in the early 1970s. In that context, there have been repeated allegations that he was involved in the 1975 disappearance and presumed murder of anti-development campaigner Juanita Nielsen.

There have also been allegations that Krahe was involved in the disappearance and presumed murder of Griffith, New South Wales anti-drugs campaigner Donald Mackay, in 1977, although the allegation about the Mackay killing was made by notorious Melbourne criminal James Frederick Bazley. Bazley is himself widely believed to have been paid to kill Mackay by infamous Griffith Mafia figure and drug dealer Robert Trimbole. Author John Jiggens claims Fred Krahe was responsible for dispensing, through his Fairfax Media newspaper connections, the rumour that Mackay had not been murdered, but instead ran away with a woman who was not his wife. Jiggens is also a strong proponent of the theory that Krahe murdered Mackay with Keith Kelly, and that Bazley was a patsy.

=== Nugan Hand Bank/Nugan Fruit Company ===
Krahe allegedly did work for the infamous Sydney-based Nugan Hand Bank as a private investigator, assisting the bank in covering their fraudulent business activities and money laundering connected to Asian drug trade and the CIA. The massive investigation into the murder of anti-drug activist Donald Mackay led to investigations of cash payouts from the family-run Nugan Fruit Company to local Griffith Mafia figures Antonio Sergi and Robert Trimbole. Bank head Frank Nugan and his brother Ken Nugan attempted to explain away the payments as nothing, but the fruit company's insurance underwriters were minority shareholders who grew suspicious, and hired an independent auditor to investigate. Frank Nugan reportedly hired Fred Krahe in 1977 to intimidate members of the Nugan Fruit Company board of directors, who, though unable to identify the names 'Sergi' and 'Trimbole', suspected that the money had essentially been embezzled. An MP, John Dowd, revealed that the auditors had "been subjected to personal pressure. Certain persons have called at their homes, and the circumstances of the visits are such as to raise the greatest concern among the citizens of the state and the attorney general." The bank (and allegedly Krahe) were unsuccessful in forcing the auditors' resignations.

Frank Nugan distributed marijuana from his family's Nugan Fruit Company packing plant in Griffith, and used Sir Peter Abeles's trucking company, Thomas Nationwide Transport (TNT) to move drugs around the world and inside Australia. Contacts in the Commonwealth Police, along with an informant, revealed to journalist Tony Reeves that Fred Krahe was given a position on the board of TNT after he retired from the police department.

An investigation by New South Wales Corporate Affairs led to obstruction, fraud and conspiracy charges over secret Nugan Hand accounts. The charges were laid against multiple Nugan employees and family, including now ex-detectives Fred Krahe and Keith Kelly. The charges against Krahe and Kelly were based upon their conduct reported at two rowdy Nugan Fruit Company board meetings in 1977. It was alleged the two had provided stock shares belonging to Frank Nugan to members of their own families, and also to some associates (described as drunken thugs), then brought them to a board meeting for a vote. This was an effort to outmanoeuvre a shareholder attempt to expand control of Nugan Fruit (in reaction to the legal advice of the board's independent auditor), by exploiting a complicated loophole in Australian corporate law regarding minority voting rights. They voted the company's insurance agents off the board, and fired the auditors. The minority shareholders cried foul, leading to the obstruction and fraud charges against Krahe. Kelly and Krahe claimed that they had merely been asked an unwelcome favour from Frank Nugan, and were unaware that what they had done was wrong. After a committal hearing before Clarrie Briese SM, the charges against Krahe and Kelly were dismissed. The two were awarded costs. Kelly's award totalled $17,500. The other defendants were committed for trial. Frank Nugan committed suicide before his trial in 1980.

=== Shirley Brifman ===
A prostitute and police informant, Shirley Margaret Brifman (usually known as Marge), ran a brothel in a flat at Potts Point, with up to fifteen girls. Brifman was interviewed by senior New South Wales and Queensland police from July to October 1971. She gave recorded responses to 320 questions. She named 33 police officers from both states in connection with corruption; she claimed to have made more than $5000 a week in 1969. She made the following claims about Fred Krahe; that he:

- collected protection money from an eastern suburbs abortion clinic and various brothels.
- Framed the criminal Darcy Dugan.
- Organized bank robberies, sometimes for bonds.
- 'Exchanged' criminals with a Queensland detective, so that the criminals could commit crimes in a state where they were unknown. One of the men was Donny "The Glove" Smith.
- Brifman also claimed she was paying Krahe $100 weekly to protect her from standover men. She claimed the total amount was $20,000 over four years. She claimed that in 1969 he introduced her to Police Commissioner Norman Allan. Allan told her to continue her work as a madame and that anyone who bothered her would 'have to answer to him'.

On 4 March 1972, Brifman was found dead in her flat in Clayfield, apparently having committed suicide by barbiturates. She had been due to appear in Sydney on 17 March, charged with procuring underage girls, including her own thirteen-year-old daughter. Brifman vehemently denied the charges. On 22 March, she was due to give testimony against a senior sergeant accused of perjury. There was no suicide note. No coroner's inquest was held, at the request of the Queensland police. In 1985, several police officers, who had served in the Sydney CIB in 1972, told David Hickie it was rumoured Krahe had gone to Brisbane and forced drugs down her throat with a tube, assisted by a Queensland policeman. Brifman's testimony regarding Krahe was tabled in March 1978 in the South Australian House of Assembly, by attorney-general Peter Duncan in a 64-page document containing Brifman's responses to the New South Wales police interviews in 1971.

== Post-retirement employment ==
Krahe's stated occupation after retirement was as a private investigator. He worked as a Sydney crime scene consultant for The Sun newspaper in the late 1970s. He was allegedly on the board of Thomas Nationwide Transit (TNT).

== Defenders ==
Krahe's memory has had some defenders. One of Australia's prominent crime reporters of the time, Bill Jenkings, described his former source (and coworker at Fairfax Media) as a 'clever investigator, who left no stone unturned in his quest to solve the most baffling of cases', but that, 'unfortunately, Krahe became far more famous for the crimes he was wrongly alleged to have committed himself'. Jenkings also refused to believe allegations about Krahe's reputed partner in crime, Ray "Gunner" Kelly. In a 1981 letter to the editor of The Sydney Morning Herald, Detective Ray Blisset (Queens Police Medal) wrote to express his 'disgust at the obituary tendered for former Detective Sergeant first Class Frederick Claude Krahe'. He went on to say that during the years he served in the police force he had worked side by side with Krahe, and knew him as a great investigator of crime, and that 'as a detective he had no peer.' Blisset showed little regard for the journalists who publicised allegations against Krahe, writing that they should, 'show respect for all the good he did and not rewrite scandalous rumours to satisfy some salacious minds'.

Sydney mobster Lenny McPherson, giving testimony in 1983 at the Juanita Neilsen inquest, told the court, 'I didn't like Fred Krahe. He arrested me hundreds of times. If I had any information (on him) I would be giving it to you'. It was at this inquest that McPherson strongly denied telling two police officers, one Commonwealth, one New South Wales, that he'd heard that Krahe had murdered Mrs. Neilsen, an allegation that was quoted initially by journalists Barry Ward and Tony Reeves in an article in the National Times.
