= Murder of Graeme Thorne =

1960 murder of Australian child Graeme Thorne

Graeme Thorne
- A family photo of Graeme Thorne
- Born: Graeme Frederick Hilton Thorne; 18 December 1951; Sydney, New South Wales, Australia
- Died: 7 July 1960 (aged 8); Sydney, New South Wales, Australia
- Body discovered: Grandview Grove, Seaforth, New South Wales, Australia; 16 August 1960
- Known for: Murder victim

Graeme Thorne was an eight year old Australian boy, who was kidnapped and murdered in 1960. A month before the kidnapping, his parents, Bazil and Freda Thorne, who lived in a modest rented flat in the Sydney beachside suburb of Bondi, had won £100,000 in the newly conceived Opera House Lottery, designed to raise money for the construction of the now famous Sydney Opera House. This was a considerable amount of money in 1960, when it was customary to publish the names and addresses of lottery winners in the newspapers.

The events of the case generated widespread public shock and ignited significant attention and societal outrage. Notably, it was the country's first well known kidnap for ransom. The police investigation leading to the capture and conviction of his kidnapper and murderer, a Hungarian immigrant named Stephen Lesley Bradley, is considered to be a pioneering and sophisticated example of advanced modern forensic investigation by world standards in 1960. The crime is still regarded as one of the most infamous in Australia's history because it was the country's first well known abduction involving a young child for ransom, almost unthinkable during an era in Australia when, "people didn't bother to lock their doors at night before going to bed".

== Background ==
In 1960, with the construction of the Sydney Opera House having proved increasingly expensive, the New South Wales government initiated numerous Opera House lotteries to help raise money. The A£100,000 first prize (equivalent to A$3.3 million in 2022) for Lottery 10 was won by Bazil Thorne (ticket 3932) in the lottery drawn on Wednesday 1 June 1960. As there was no real conception of the need for privacy for lottery winners at that time, and also for the sake of transparency, images and private details of lottery winners were published on the front pages of Sydney newspapers. It was also revealed that the prize would be paid by Thursday 7 July.

The Thorne family consisted of Bazil, his wife Freda, older daughter Cheryl (who had been institutionalised), son Graeme (8) and younger daughter Belinda (3). They lived at 79 Edward Street, a rented house in the Sydney suburb of Bondi. Thorne's morning routine was to wait at the corner of Wellington and O'Brien streets, a walk of approximately 300 metres, where a family friend, Phyllis Smith, would pick him up and take him to school with her sons.

On the morning of 7 July, five weeks after the lottery win, Thorne left for school as usual at 8:30 a.m., but when Smith came to collect him at 8:40, he was nowhere to be seen. Smith drove to the Thornes' home to find out if he was going to school. Surprised, Thorne's mother confirmed that he was and wondered if he might have arrived at the school by some other means. Smith drove to the school, The Scots College in Bellevue Hill, but returned upon finding out Thorne was not there. Thorne's mother then called the police to report him missing.

== Ransom demand ==
At 9:40 a.m., seventy minutes after Thorne had left for school, a man with a noticeable foreign accent telephoned the Thorne household. Sergeant Larry O'Shea of the Bondi police had already arrived around 9:30, and took the telephone from Freda Thorne, pretending to be his father (who was out of town in Kempsey on business). The kidnapper stated: "I have your boy. I want £25,000 before five o’clock this afternoon. I’m not fooling. If I don’t get the money before five o’clock, I’ll feed the boy to the sharks." O'Shea expressed doubt as to his ability to get hold of such a large sum of money, being unaware that the Thornes had recently won the lottery. The caller then said that he would call back at 5:00 p.m. with more details, and hung up.

At 9:47 p.m. the kidnapper phoned again, but the telephone was answered by a different police officer (also pretending to be Thorne's father), who stalled for time to allow for a phone trace to happen. The kidnapper started to give instructions that the money was to be put in two paper bags, but then hung up abruptly without providing further instructions.

== Investigation ==
The police had been busy during the first day of the kidnapping, conducting a concentrated search near the Thorne house in Bondi. News of the kidnapping soon leaked to Bill Jenkings of the Sydney Daily Mirror, and at 8:30 p.m. a public appeal was made on television from Bondi police station by NSW Police Commissioner Colin Delaney, then briefly by an emotional Bazil Thorne.

The next evening, on Friday 8 July, the focus of the investigation moved to Sydney's north-eastern suburbs, when Thorne's school case was found near Seaforth. On the same day, a tip was received that a boy matching Thorne's description was seen with two men and a woman heading out of Pennant Hills. The owners of a petrol station there had reported that they saw the group with the boy pulling into the petrol station in a dark-coloured vehicle at about 10 pm on 7 July. The owners had described the vehicle as a dark-coloured Dodge-type sedan with the number plate on the front missing. The group purchased fuel and, as their vehicle left, the owners managed to sight the rear number plate. When the vehicle was spotted by an off-duty police officer the following day, it sped off. Checks revealed that the number was registered to a different vehicle.

On 11 July, Thorne's school cap and the contents of the case were found nearby. Soon after the discovery, an official reward of £5,000 was declared, and another £15,000 was offered by two newspapers, leading to a number of hoax calls.

Investigators, with the collaboration of Sydney's underworld, followed other pieces of evidence. On Tuesday 14 June a foreign man, acting as an investigator, had called at the Thornes' residence seeking a "Mr Bognor" while also asking Thorne's mother to confirm their as-yet unlisted telephone number. A similar looking man had also been seen numerous times by multiple witnesses in the park opposite the house. Also, at 8:20 a.m. on the morning of the kidnapping, some witnesses had seen an iridescent blue 1955 Ford Customline double-parked on the corner of Francis and Wellington streets, near where Thorne was usually picked up for school. Checking more than 270,000 registration records, police established that there were 5,000 vehicles matching this general description. Assuming the car had been either borrowed or stolen, officers interviewed owners, including Stephen Bradley on 24 August, about car use at that time. Bradley denied having been in Bondi that day.

On Tuesday 16 August, nearly six weeks after the kidnapping and 1.5 km from where the school case was found, Thorne's body was finally discovered hidden on vacant land in Grandview Grove, Seaforth, and identified at the City Morgue by his father the next day. Wrapped in a blue tartan picnic blanket, and tucked into a ledge, the boy had been tied with string, gagged with a scarf and was still wearing his school uniform. The blanket containing the body had been there for some time; two local children had known about it, but the discovery was only made when mentioned to their parents around 7:00 p.m. that day.

Forensic examination of the blanket showed it to be No. 0639 (of 3,000) which had been manufactured at Onkaparinga Mills in South Australia, between 6 June 1955 and 19 January 1956. It had been sold in Melbourne to a friend of Bradley's wife as a gift. Additionally, forensic botanist Joyce Winifred Vickery identified two tree types (Chamaecyparis pisifera and Cupressus glabra) that were not present at the vacant lot where the body was found but which were present in the blanket, along with Pekingese and blonde human hair. Examination of the body showed cuts and abrasions and internal trauma, and it was clear that the boy had died from either asphyxiation, a skull fracture or a combination of the two. Forensic experts (including from the School of Agriculture, University of Sydney) gathered time data from Thorne's body, his stomach contents, fungi on his shoes and fly larvae (identified as Calliphora stygia). Examination established that Thorne had been murdered within twenty-four hours of the kidnapping, and dumped soon afterwards. In addition, soil scrapings from the body and the blanket showed tiny fragments of pink "limestock mortar", revealing that his body had been stored under a house.

Police then searched for a house with a blue car, pink mortar and with the two species of tree growing in the yard. Although cypresses could be found growing in many people's yards, the combination of the two together was rare. Following a tip-off from a postman, a house was identified at 28 Moore Street in the suburb of Clontarf, 1.5 km from where the body was found. Police visited the house on Monday 3 October and learnt that it had been occupied by a Hungarian immigrant named Stephen Bradley. Bradley had also owned an iridescent blue 1955 Ford Customline (registration number AYO-382), had a Pekingese as a family pet and his wife had dyed blonde hair. However, Bradley and his family had vacated the house on 7 July for a rented flat at 49 Osborne Street in Manly, and had left Australia for London with his family a week earlier, on 26 September, aboard SS Himalaya.

== Extradition and trial ==
When Himalaya docked at Colombo, Ceylon, on Monday 10 October, two Sydney policemen, Sergeants Brian Doyle and Jack Bateman, were waiting for Bradley. After five weeks of legal wrangling, Bradley was extradited to Australia on 18 November 1960, allegedly making an oral confession to Bateman just before the BOAC flight landed in Sydney. The next day at 10:00 a.m., Bradley signed a written confession in English (although he later retracted it), part of which states:

"I went out and watched the Thorne boy leaving the house and seen him for about three mornings and I have seen where he went. And one morning I have followed him to the school at Bellevue Hill. One or two mornings I have seen a womman [sic] pick him up, and take him to the school. On the day we moved from Clontarf I went out to Edward Street. I parked the car in a street I don’t know the name of the street it is off Wellington Street. I have got out from the car, and I waited on the cornor [sic], untill [sic] the boy walked down to the car."

The trial at the Central Criminal Court in Sydney began on Monday 20 March 1961.

Examination of Bradley's past revealed that he had been born Istvan Baranyay in Budapest on 15 March 1926 and, having survived World War II and the communist takeover, had arrived in Melbourne aboard Skaugum on 28 March 1950. A divorcée since 1948, Bradley had remarried in 1952 and had a child with Eva Maria Lazlo in Melbourne, living with her until her death in a car accident on 26 February 1955. Baranyay later anglicised and changed his name by deed poll to Stephen Leslie Bradley in August 1956. In 1958 he married a third time to Magda Wittman, a divorcée with two children. Feeling pressure to care for his expanded family, he was forced to work at a number of different jobs as their savings dwindled. He was then possibly inspired by the April 1960 Peugeot ransom case in Paris to attempt the abduction.

In court, Bradley pleaded not guilty to murder but was identified as the man seen by witnesses (including by Freda Thorne). He admitted the kidnapping, providing details of how he posed as a driver and fabricated a tale to persuade Thorne into his car that day. Taking him west to Centennial Park, he had then assaulted the boy, rendered him unconscious, then tied and wrapped him up in a blanket, and placed him in the boot before driving north across the Sydney Harbour Bridge and making the first ransom call. Arriving at his home in nearby Clontarf, he rechecked the boy, but at around 3:00 p.m. when he checked again, he claimed that Thorne had apparently suffocated in the back of his car. Forensic experts soon disproved this by connecting a breathing mask to the inside of the boot and breathing the air for seven hours. Bradley's wife was also brought in from London to testify, but there was no clear evidence of her involvement. The high-profile trial for murder lasted nine days, and Bradley was sentenced to penal servitude for life, the maximum penalty provided in New South Wales for murder. A later Court of Criminal Appeal hearing was dismissed unanimously on 22 May 1961.

== Aftermath ==
News surrounding the case led to an overwhelming sense of public shock, disbelief and anger which, alongside later events such as the Wanda Beach Murders and the Beaumont disappearance, "marked an end of innocence in Australian life". Lottery procedures in Australia were changed after the Thorne case, with winners being given the option of remaining anonymous. The case also proved pivotal to the development of forensic science and new kidnapping laws in Australia. Kidnapping for ransom was seen as a primarily American phenomenon, most notably in the Lindbergh kidnapping. Prior to the Thorne case, such events were unknown in Australia.

After the trial, Bradley was sent to Goulburn gaol, where he worked as a hospital orderly and was kept protected from other prisoners. His wife and children returned to Europe, and Magda Bradley divorced him in 1965. On 6 October 1968 Bradley died in prison of a heart attack at the age of 42, while playing in the gaol tennis competition, and was buried in the Catholic section of Goulburn cemetery. Regarding the crime, "Bradley never showed any remorse whatsoever". The Thornes, meanwhile, moved to Rose Bay. Bazil Thorne died in December 1978. Freda Thorne died in 2012 aged 86.

== Media ==
Thorne's murder was the focus of the Crime Investigation Australia season 1 episode "Kid for Ransom" aired in 2005. In 2008, a children's detective book titled Kidnapping File: the Graeme Thorne Case was developed by Amanda Howard and published in the U.S. The book Kidnapped by Mark Tedeschi QC was published in 2015, and in January 2018, Casefile True Crime Podcast featured the Thorne kidnapping in Case 75.

== See also ==
- List of kidnappings (1960–1969)
- Murder of Allen Redston
