= Wanda Beach murders =

1965 unsolved murders in Australia

- Christine Sharrock and Marianne Schmidt
- Date: 11 January 1965
- Location: Wanda Beach near Cronulla, in Sydney, New South Wales, Australia
- Type: Murder x 2
- Cause: 1. Throat slashed and multiple stab wounds 2. Blow to the back of the head and multiple stab wounds
- Outcome: Unsolved cold case
- Deaths: 1. Marianne Schmidt (aged 15 years); 2. Christine Sharrock (aged 15 years)

The Wanda Beach murders, also known simply as "Wanda", are the unsolved murders of Marianne Schmidt and Christine Sharrock at Wanda Beach near Cronulla in Sydney, New South Wales, Australia, on 11 January 1965. The victims, both aged 15, were best friends and neighbours from the suburb of West Ryde, and their partially buried bodies were discovered the next day. The brutal nature of the slayings and the fact that they occurred on a deserted, windswept beach brought massive publicity to the case. By April 1966, police had interviewed some 7,000 people, making it the largest investigation in Australian history. It remains one of the most infamous unsolved Australian murder cases of the 1960s, and New South Wales' oldest unsolved homicide case.

== The victims ==
Marianne Schmidt had arrived in Melbourne, Victoria, with her family from West Germany in September 1958. At the time, the Schmidt family consisted of parents Helmut and Elisabeth; and Marianne and her siblings: Helmut Jr., Hans, Peter, Trixie, and Wolfgang. Another child, Norbert, was born the following year. After arriving in Australia, the Schmidt family lived in a migrant hostel in Unanderra, New South Wales, before settling in Temora. In 1963, Helmut Schmidt moved the family to the Sydney area after being diagnosed with Hodgkin's disease, residing in a home in West Ryde. Helmut passed away the following year.

Schmidt's next-door neighbour was Christine Sharrock, who lived with her grandparents Jim and Jeanette Taig. Sharrock's father had died in 1953; her mother Beryl Sharrock remarried and was living in the north-western Sydney suburb of Seven Hills. Sharrock moved in with her grandparents by choice and when the Schmidts arrived next door, she developed a strong friendship with Marianne, who was of the same age. It is not known why Sharrock preferred to live with her grandparents and not her mother and stepfather.

== Disappearance ==
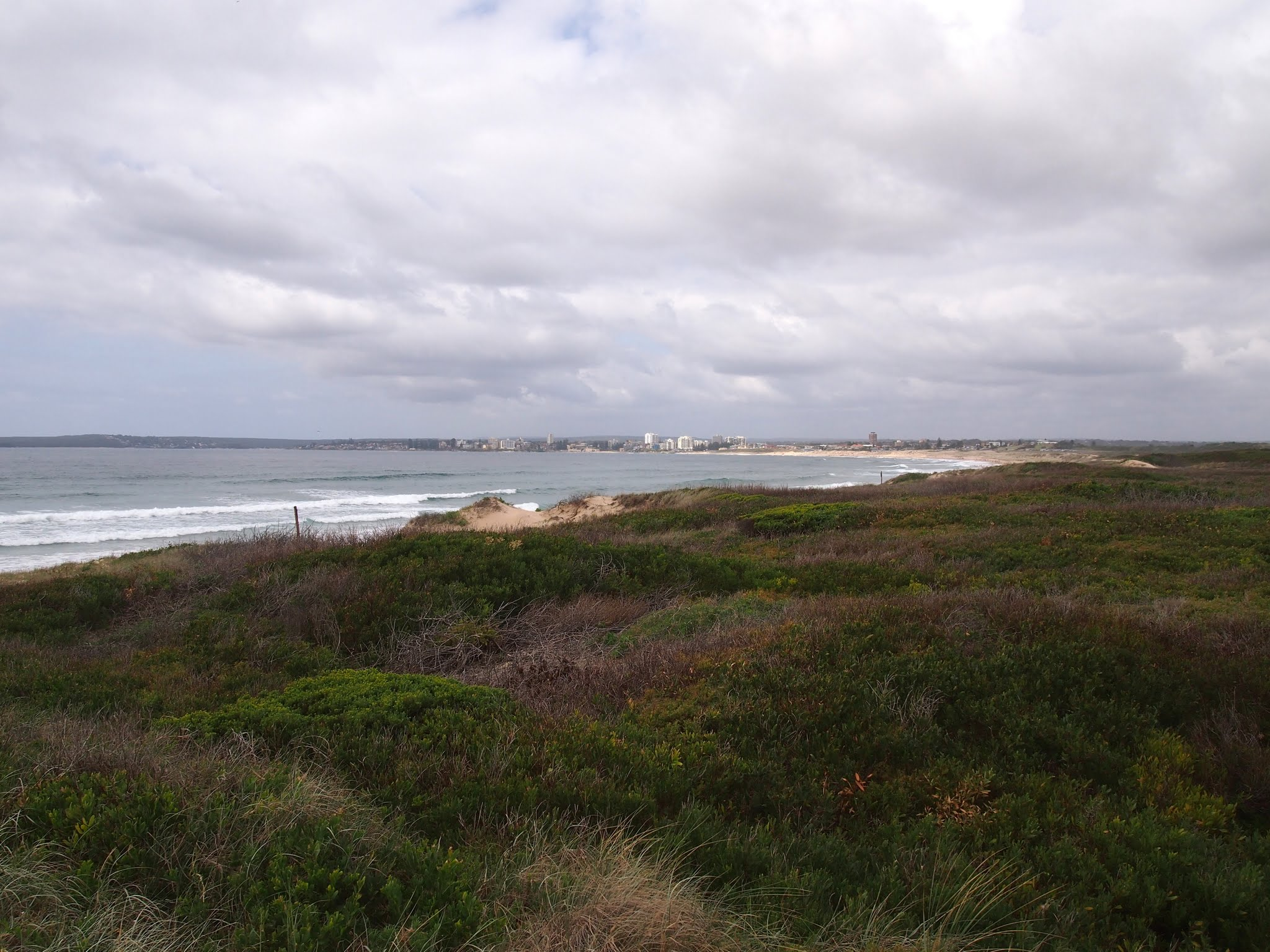
Wanda Beach area (2012)

On 1 January 1965, Sharrock and Schmidt visited the beach at Cronulla, which had been a popular picnic spot for the Schmidt family. Diary entries, read after the murders, indicated that the girls had kissed some boys at the beach that day. The following day, the Schmidt children visited Cronulla again without Sharrock. Meanwhile, Schmidt's mother had been admitted to a hospital for a major operation, leaving Helmut Jr. and Marianne in charge of the household. On Saturday 9 January, Schmidt and Sharrock asked Schmidt's mother (who was still hospitalised) if they could take the younger children to Cronulla the next day and were given permission; however, rain prevented the trip.

On Monday 11 January, accompanied by Schmidt's four youngest siblings, the girls again set off by train for Cronulla railway station after transferring at Redfern. They arrived at about 11:00 am, but it was very windy and the beach was closed. The group then walked down to the southern end of the beach and sheltered among the rocks. Eight-year-old Wolfgang still wanted to swim, so Schmidt went with him to a shallow part of the surf away from the rocks. After they returned to the group, they had a picnic. At some point during this time, Sharrock left the others and went off by herself.

When Sharrock returned to the group, they went for a walk into the sandhills behind Wanda Beach. Around 1:00 pm, the group had reached a point around 400 metres (430 yards) beyond the Wanda Surf Club. They stopped to take shelter behind a sandhill as the younger children were complaining about the conditions. Schmidt told her younger siblings that she and Sharrock would return to the rocky area at the south end of the beach where they had hidden their bags, then return to fetch the children and head home. Instead, however, the girls continued into the sandhills. When Peter told them they were going the wrong way, they laughed at him and walked on.

The Schmidt children remained waiting behind the sandhill until 5:00 pm, at which time they returned to collect their bags (including Schmidt and Sharrock's purses) and went home on the last train, arriving home around 8:00 pm. Schmidt and Sharrock were reported missing at 8:30 pm by Sharrock's grandmother.

The next morning, on Tuesday 12 January, Peter Smith was taking three young nephews for a walk through the Wanda Beach sandhills. Some distance north of the Wanda Surf Club, he discovered what appeared to be a store mannequin buried face-down in the sand. He brushed away sand from the head and realised that it was a body, and the police were called from the surf club. At this point, Smith believed he had found only one body.

== Investigation ==
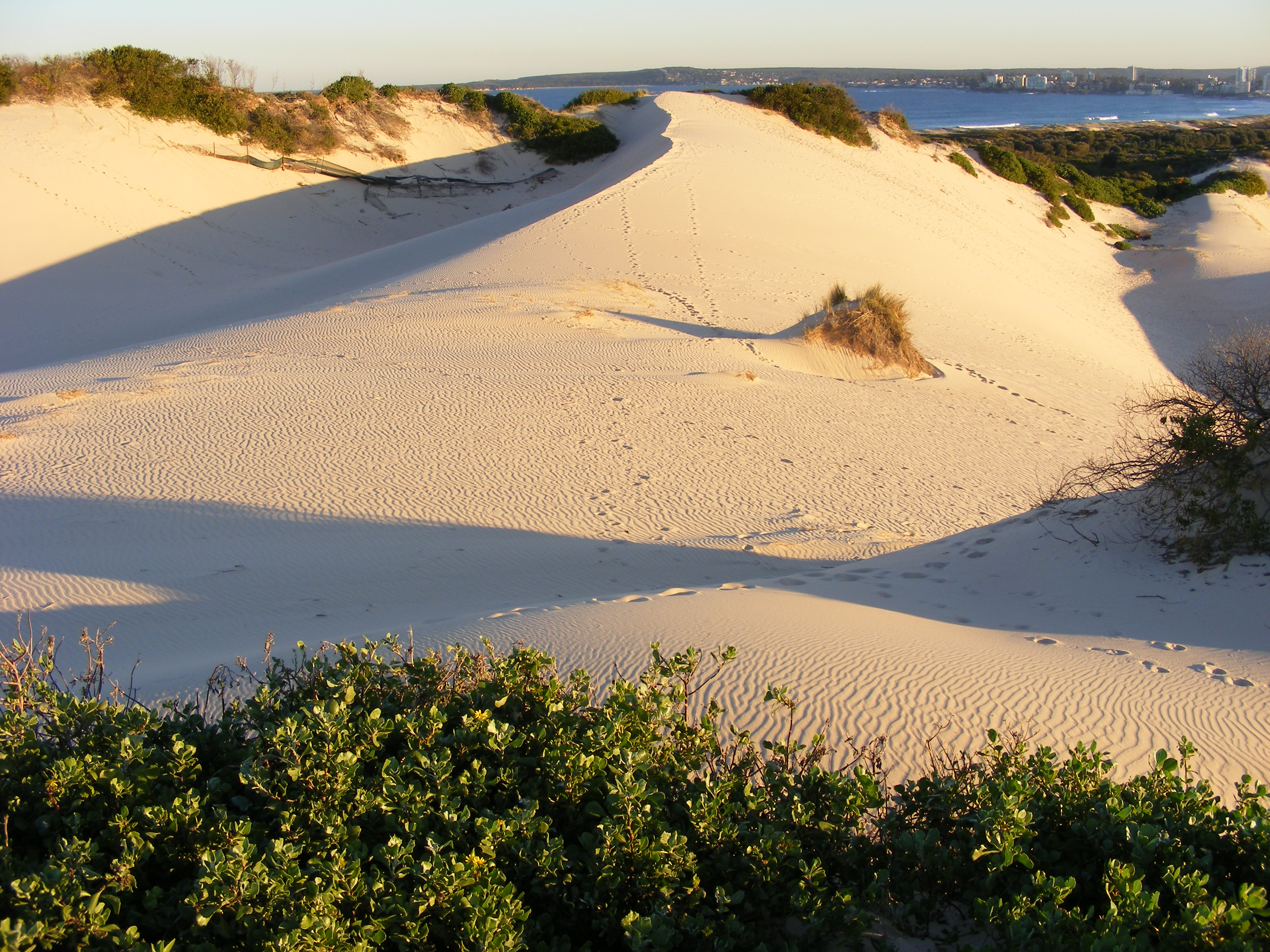
The Wanda sand hills

When the murder scene was examined, Schmidt was found lying on her right side with her left leg bent. Sharrock was face down, her head against the sole of Schmidt's left foot. Both had scratch marks on their faces. From a 34 metre (37 yard) long drag mark leading to the scene, police determined that Sharrock had fled, possibly while Schmidt was dying, only to have been caught, incapacitated and dragged back to the body of her friend. An intensive search was undertaken to find the murder weapons, a long knife and some sort of blunt instrument, but they were never found. Tonnes of sand from around the murder scene were sifted through and various items were found, including a blood-stained knife blade, but police were unable to link it to the murders.

The autopsy for Sharrock found a BAC of 0.015, but alcohol was not found in Schmidt's autopsy. It was also discovered that Sharrock had consumed food (cabbage and celery – i.e., possibly a Chiko Roll) that was different from the rest of the party; it is suspected this occurred while she was alone. Sharrock's skull had been fractured by a blow to the back of the head and she had been stabbed fourteen times. Schmidt's throat had been deeply slashed and she had been stabbed six times. Their underwear had been cut, and attempts had been made to rape both girls. Semen was found on both girls but the autopsy showed that their hymens were intact. Schmidt's brother Hans had viewed photos of her body and said, "She'd been stabbed twenty-five to thirty times. She'd almost been decapitated because her throat had been cut so viciously."

It was also during Sharrock's absence that Wolfgang noticed a teenage boy hunting crabs. Later, he claimed to have seen the same boy twice more, once in the company of his sister and Sharrock and again sometime much later walking alone. There has been doubt about his description of this person, as Wolfgang's testimony over time variously suggested he had a homemade speargun, a fishing knife or both. The last official sighting of the girls was around 12:45 by local fireman Dennis Dostine, who was walking in the area with his son and saw the girls walking about 730 metres (800 yards) north of the surf club. Dostine told police that they seemed to be hurrying, and one of the girls often looked behind her as if they were being followed. He did not see anybody else. There had been a number of people seen in the area who were never identified and never came forward.

The funerals for Schmidt and Sharrock were held on 20 January, and an A£10,000 reward was posted in February (later converted to A$20,000 in 1966), which stood unchanged as of August 2002. In April 1966 the coroner handed down his report, by which time police had interviewed some 7,000 people, making it the largest investigation in Australian history. Despite this, the murders quickly became a cold case and none of the three main suspects fit the description of the surfer youth who has never been identified. The case was reopened in 2000, and in February 2012, the New South Wales Police Force's Cold Case Unit announced that a weak, male DNA sample had been extracted from a pair of white shorts worn by Sharrock. While admitting that current technology was unable to provide more information, police were confident that future advances would give more assistance. In July 2014, police said that a semen sample taken from Schmidt's body had been lost and could not be located despite an extensive search.

=== Suspects ===
Cec Johnson, a former detective who had investigated the murders, was given a painting in 1975 by Alan Bassett, who had been jailed for the brutal rape and murder of Carolyn Orphin in Wollongong on 11 June 1966. Bassett's painting, titled "A Bloody Awful Thing", showed an abstract landscape. Johnson believed the painting showed blood trails, a broken knife blade and the body of a victim, and became convinced that Bassett was the Wanda Beach killer. He also became convinced that the painting showed a scene from the murders that only the killer would know, as well as clues to the also-unsolved murders of Wilhelmina Kruger and Anna Toskayoa Dowlingkoa. Despite the scepticism of other detectives, Johnson wrote a book about the case. However, before it could be published, he was killed in an accident. Other detectives, while retaining professional respect for Johnson, concluded that he was wrong in his belief.

One person Johnson convinced, however, was Daily Mirror crime reporter Bill Jenkings, who repeated Johnson's claims in his ghostwritten memoirs, As Crime Goes By. In a chapter devoted to the Wanda Beach murders, most of which is essentially a repeat of what he had written in his earlier book Crime Reporter, Jenkings mentions Bassett and his painting. Bassett, who had been released from prison in 1995, commenced proceedings for defamation in the Supreme Court of New South Wales; the publisher pleaded defences of justification (Bassett being a convicted murderer) and the proceedings never went further. Since his release, Bassett has voluntarily given a DNA sample to clear his name, but whether or not he has been eliminated as a suspect in the Wanda Beach murders has yet to be publicised.

A second suspect is serial killer Christopher Wilder. Two years prior to the murders, Wilder had been convicted of a gang-rape on a Sydney beach which led police to include him as a suspect. Wilder had emigrated to the United States in 1969; while visiting his parents in Australia in 1982, he was charged with sexual offences against two 15-year-old girls whom he had forced to pose nude. Wilder fled back to the US, and in the first half of 1984, he committed eight murders and attempted several more. He accidentally killed himself during a struggle with police in New Hampshire on 13 April 1984.

A third suspect, not well publicised until 1998, is Derek Percy, who had been imprisoned since 1969 for the murder of a child on a beach in Victoria. Percy, considered too dangerous to be released and the prime suspect for a number of other murders of children in Melbourne and Sydney, died in 2013 from cancer. He was considered a leading suspect in the Wanda Beach murders by police. While Percy can be linked to Cronulla on the date of the murders, no other links have been found. It was hoped he would make confessions on his deathbed, but these never came.

=== Possible linked cases ===
Two far less well-known murders also occurred during early 1966 (in the days following the nationally publicised disappearance of the Beaumont children) which, police at the time speculated, might have been connected to the Wanda Beach murders.

- On Saturday 29 January 1966, a 56-year old cleaning lady named Wilhelmina Kruger was killed in the Piccadilly Centre on Crown Street in Wollongong. Her bloodied body was discovered around 5:45 a.m. at the foot of the basement-level stairs by a butcher who had arrived for work. Having been first assaulted three floors above, probably around 4:30 a.m., she had been brutally dragged down the escalators and stairs. She was then strangled, stabbed, mutilated and was found naked from the chest down. Police also found cigarette burns in her clothing and blond hair was found at the scene. In the time prior to the murder, Kruger had become nervous that someone was watching her and had been driven to work by her husband. Similarly, the lights in the car park within the Centre had shown recent signs of tampering, including on the morning of the murder. A witness who lived near the Centre reported seeing a vehicle speeding nearby at around 4:55 a.m. on the day of the murder. The witness described the vehicle as a rusty cream-coloured utility, possibly a Holden or a Chevrolet-type model with a plywood canopy attached to the rear of the vehicle. The witness gave a description of the driver as a tall, lean male of a dishevelled appearance. This report was corroborated by two couples who were staying at the Centre's motel, who asked a male about local accommodation shortly before Kruger's murder. The group also stated that they heard the sound of a vehicle speeding away shortly after the murder. The group's description of the male to whom they spoke and the vehicle he drove matched the description of the speeding driver. Considered one of the most brutal attacks in the history of the state, the case remains unsolved. Police believed that the murder might have been the work of the Wanda Beach killer, but would not say why.
- Around midnight on Wednesday 16 February 1966, a 27-year-old shop assistant and prostitute from Bondi named Anna Toskayoa Dowlingkoa went missing after leaving the Taxi Club in Kings Cross. Ten days later, at around 5:30 p.m. on 26 February, her semi-naked, strangled, stabbed and mutilated body was found by a truck driver who had stopped at the side of Old Illawarra Road in Menai to change a tyre. Most of Dowlingkoa's clothes and belongings were missing, and drag evidence showed that her body had been moved to a more visible location around three to four days prior to discovery. Police immediately linked her brutal "Jack the Ripper-like murder" with that of Kruger, and investigators from that crime were called in to assist. They believed that the murder might have been the work of the Wanda Beach killer, primarily based on circumstantial evidence and similarities in modus operandi.

In both the murders of Kruger and Dowlingkoa, police believed that the killer was taunting them. In the Kruger murder, a witness calling himself "Gary" gave a statement that he and a girlfriend were sitting in his car parked in Railway Square, directly behind the Piccadilly Centre, when he saw the utility pulling into the square sometime between 2:30 a.m. and 3:00 a.m. on the morning of the murder. "Gary" also stated that the vehicle circled Railway Square three times before turning back onto Gladstone Avenue and parking opposite the Piccadilly Centre. Police checks revealed that no such person existed on any record and the address that "Gary" gave detectives was false.

== Media ==
=== Books ===
A book, Wanda: The Untold Story of the Wanda Beach Murders by Alan J. Whiticker, was published in January 2003.

=== Podcasts ===
The murders were the focus of an episode of:

- Crime Investigation Australia entitled "The Wanda Beach Murders/Beaumont Children Mystery".
- Casefile True Crime Podcast for the premiere January 2016. An updated production of this episode was released in January 2026. Related cases received a stand-alone episode in January 2018.
- My favourite Murder on 21 August 2025 in episode 494.
- Catching Evil proposing Christopher Wilder as the suspected perpetrator.
- Red Thread titled "The Wanda Beach Murders" released in July 2026.

== See also ==
- List of solved missing person cases: 1950–1999
- List of unsolved murders (1900–1979)
