= Red string =

Red string may be:

- Red string (Kabbalah), a thin red string worn to ward off misfortune
- Kalava, the sacred Hindu red string
- Red String (webcomic), a manga-style webcomic
- Red thread of fate, an East Asian belief similar to the concept of a soulmate
- The Red String (documentary) a documentary film about four Chinese-born girls and their adopted families
- Redstring Productions, Inc., an American-based family entertainment company
- Red Strings, a group of pro-Union southerners during the American Civil War

== See also ==
- Red Thread (disambiguation)
