= Amanda Howard =

Australian writer

Amanda Howard (born 1973) is an Australian fiction writer, true crime author, and expert on serial killers.

== Early life and education ==
Amanda Howard was born on 19 November 1973 in Bankstown, New South Wales, Australia. She lists her early crime influences as the 1989-1990 The Granny Killer case and the 1991 movie, The Silence of the Lambs. In 2003, she received a bachelor's degree in social science (criminology) from Charles Sturt University. In 2012, she received a diploma of management (health care) from TAFE NSW. In 2015-2017, she studied for a master's degree of arts (writing) from Swinburne University of Technology and in 2019, a graduate certificate (criminology) at Griffith University. She is currently studying a master's degree (criminology) at Macquarie University.

== Career ==
Her interest in criminology began when she noticed factual errors in an undergraduate textbook, and set out to confirm the information by writing directly to the criminal (in this case Ivan Milat). Following this, she wrote to others and when many began writing back, she decided to pursue it further. After 25 years of corresponding with hundreds of serial killers (including Milat, Charles Manson, David Birnie, Richard Ramirez, Ian Brady, and Roy Norris) she has been nicknamed "The Serial Killer Whisperer" by sections of the media.

Howard released her first books in 2004, and has since made numerous media appearances on radio, television, at conferences, online, and also appears on the morning show Studio 10 as a regular guest. In 2017, she was included in the Who's Who of Australian Women. In 2018, she began work as an associate producer on an American film about serial killer Jesse Pommeroy.

In 2019, Howard opened a pop up museum exhibition called Memento Mori Death Museum. It features pieces from her true crime collection and correspondence from killers from across the globe as well as pieces related to death and culture.

== Personal life ==
Howard was married to Steve, a high-school peer, and they went on to have two children. In mid-2017, however, her husband committed suicide at the family home at the age of 42. As a result of his death, Howard is now a spokesperson for male suicide prevention.

== Bibliography ==
Howard has authored a number of books and articles in a number of genres:

2004:

- Ripper Notes: Murder by Numbers (chapter only)
- Ripper Notes: Madmen, Myths and Magic (chapter only)
- River of Blood: Serial Killers and their Victims (co-author: Martin Smith)

2005:

- Man of The Shadows (Ripperologist Magazine 62; co-authors: Adam Went and Antonio Sironi)

2007:

- The Lottery Kidnapping (Forensic Files)
- Million Dollar Art Theft (Forensic Files)
- Robbery File: The Museum Heist (Crime Solvers)
- Terror in the Skies: The Lockerbie Bombing (Forensic Files)
- Terrorist Bombing File: The Lockerbie Investigation (Crime Solvers)
- Sex Or No Sex (Ripperologist Magazine 83)
- On Whether JTR Was A Sexual Serial Killer (Ripperologist Magazine 86; co-author: RJ Palmer)

2008:

- Kidnapping File: The Graeme Thorne Case (Crime Solvers)
- One Hundred and Twenty Years Ago (Ripperologist Magazine 94)

2009:

- Innocence Lost
- Predators

2011:

- Predators - Killers Without A Conscience (co-author: Paul Wilson)
- Serial Killers and Philosophy

2013:

- Charlotte's One of a Kind Cakes
- The Cicadas Roar
- A Killer in the Family (nominated as a finalist for the Davitt National Crime Writing Award)

2014:

- Murder on the Mind

2015:

- A Thousand Cuts

2016:

- How to be An Author: 36 Real Authors Talk Writing and Publishing (chapter only)
- Innocence Lost: The Crimes That Changed Australia
- Killer Australia: Death and Destruction Down Under
- Rope: A History of the Hanged

2017:

- Bound by Blood: Killers We Trust
- Child Killers: When Evil Hunts Innocence
- Killer Minds: An Insight into the Minds of Serial Killers
- Killing Time: Tales of Terror and Torment
- Life, Death and Other Funny Stories

2018:

- Monsters Who Murder (Volume 1)
- The Story of the Hanged

=== Kate Reilly series ===
Howard has also authored a series of investigative novels "following the life of a police detective who is an international expert on ritual crimes and ancient societies." The series, set in the fictional Somerset Police Violent Crimes Department, currently consists of:

- The Blood of Many (Ritual book 1) (2013)
- The Elements of Murder (Ritual book 2) (2013)
- A Thousand Cuts (Ritual book 3) (2015)
- Shrouded Echoes (Ritual book 4) (2016)

== Media ==
- Monsters Who Murder - an Australian crime podcast hosted by Howard and Robert McKnight (2018–present)
- Behind True Crime - Amanda Howard, The Serial Killer Whisperer (11 August 2017)
- Australian True Crime - Serial Killer Whisperer Amanda Howard - #49 (10 May 2018)
- Australian True Crime - The Woman Who Thinks Ivan Milat is Innocent - #70 (27 September 2018)
- Amanda on 'The Feed' - SBS Television
