= Athol Moffitt =

Australian judge and writer (1914–2007)

Athol Randolph Moffitt AM CMG QC (1914–2007) was an eminent Australian jurist and was the author of several books. He is best known as the chair of the landmark 1973-74 Moffitt Royal Commission, which investigated organised crime in New South Wales.

== Biography ==
Moffit was the son of NSW workers' compensation judge Herbert William Moffitt, and his older sister Gwen was also a practising solicitor. He was educated at North Sydney Boys High School and then studied law at the University of Sydney, where he graduated with first-class honours. He was admitted to the NSW bar in 1938.

At the outset of World War II, Moffitt joined the AIF as a private in the artillery, reaching the rank of captain. He was involved with the war crimes trials held at Labuan of the Japanese officers and soldiers who had taken part in the murders and brutality at the prisoner of war camp at Sandakan and the Sandakan death marches. As a result of these trials, eight Japanese, including Captain Hoshijima Susumi, the Sandakan camp commandant, were hanged, and 55 more were imprisoned. Moffitt published Project Kingfisher, a book about the Sandakan atrocities and a stalled rescue plan, in 1989.

On 29 April 1948, Moffitt married Heather Williams daughter of Mr F. Williams. Together they had two sons one of whom died of a heroin overdose which in part go some way to explain Moffitt's strident attitude towards illegal drugs. His son's death only served to redouble his efforts in relation to the war on drugs and organised crime.

Moffitt was appointed a Queen's Counsel in 1956, and became a member of the bar council. In 1959, he acted as a NSW Supreme Court judge for six months. He was again appointed acting judge in 1962, relieving the ailing Justice Bill Dovey and became a permanent judge in November that year. In 1969 Moffitt went to the New South Wales Court of Appeal.

In 1973, he was appointed to head a royal commission investigating allegations of organised crime in licensed clubs in NSW. The royal commission uncovered apparent links between the American Mafia and local organised crime figures such as Sydney's "Mr Big", Lenny McPherson and the involvement of organised crime groups in the growing trade in illegal drugs especially heroin. It also investigated the activities (and alleged Mafia links) of the Bally poker machine company, the major supplier of gaming equipment to licensed clubs.

In 1974, Moffitt became President of the New South Wales Court of Appeal. He was awarded the Order of St Michael and St George in the 1979 Queen's Birthday Honours and, later, made a Member of the Order of Australia (AM). During his time, he had a reputation for placing puisne justices under pressure to reach favourable decisions for personal reasons. For example, Justice Robert Marsden Hope admitted in 1998 to having been pressured in such a way on two occasions.

Moffitt retired from the Supreme Court in June 1984, on reaching the mandatory retirement age of 70. The following year, he published a book on organised crime, A Quarter to Midnight, which claimed that organised crime in Australia was far more extensive than governments were prepared to admit, that the National Crime Authority was a "lame duck" and that the close ties between the trade union movement and ALP governments was hindering the investigation of criminal activity in unions.

In 1998, he wrote a book on the drug problem, Drug Precipice, and followed by another book on the same subject, Drug Alert, a simpler exposition of the problem.

In 1999, he publicly criticised the opening of a legal heroin injection room in Kings Cross, Sydney and in 2000 he publicly commented that the prosecution of alleged World War II war criminal Konrāds Kalējs was unrealistic.

In his last public address, in 2006, to the professional club, Probus, Moffitt revealed that the late crime boss Lenny McPherson had been a paid informant to his 1973-74 royal commission.

== Publications ==
- Project Kingfisher: The Terrible Story of the Massacres of the Sandakan POWs in Borneo - and the Secret Plan for a Rescue That Never Happened 1989

Legal offices
Preceded by Kenneth Jacobs	President of the New South Wales Court of Appeal; 1974 – 1984	Succeeded by Michael Kirby
