= Philip Arantz =

Philip Arantz (1929–1998) was a detective sergeant in the New South Wales Police.

During the early 1970s, Arantz achieved Australian fame when he became involved in a long-running and highly publicised battle with the New South Wales government after having been dismissed from his job. Arantz claimed that he had been victimised for his whistle-blowing actions, which had exposed systematic police corruption.

In 1971, while working on a computerisation program, Arantz discovered that the NSW police service had been systematically under-reporting crime statistics for years. The obvious conclusion from this revelation was that police were trying to conceal corruption, which allegedly extended up to the Police Commissioner himself, and the widespread police involvement in organised crime.

Arantz took his allegations to senior police personnel, but they were dismissed out of hand. Eventually Arantz realised that Norman Thomas William Allan (who had been the state's Police Commissioner since 1962) was at least aware of the scheme, if not directly involved in it, and that he wanted to suppress Arantz's revelations.

The frustrated Arantz created history when, through the journalist Basil Sweeney, he had official figures published in The Sydney Morning Herald showing that reported crime in 1971 was 75 per cent above the figures for 1970. So huge a difference could not be explained by a crime wave.

An enraged Allan began a campaign to destroy Arantz's credibility. As a result, Arantz was suspended, forced to undergo a psychiatric assessment and, finally, dishonourably discharged from the police force. It took him years to clear his name. Meanwhile, both Commissioner Allan and New South Wales Premier Robert Askin had retired (respectively in 1972 and 1975), avoiding the taint from the scandal. It was not until 1989 that Arantz and his claims were finally and publicly vindicated, by which point Askin and Allan were long since dead.

Four years earlier, the state government, led since 1976 by Neville Wran, had paid Arantz $250,000. The special legislation passed in 1989 allowed Arantz's notional reinstatement. With his victory behind him, Arantz retired to Dunedoo in the state's mid-west.

In 1993, Arantz wrote a book about his experiences, entitled A Collusion of Powers. Five years later he died.
