= Moffitt Royal Commission =

New South Wales organised crime inquiry

Royal Commission of Inquiry in respect of certain matters relating to allegations of organised crime in clubs
- Date: 1973–1974
- Duration: 2 years
- Location: Sydney, Australia
- Also known as: Moffitt Royal Commission
- Commissioner: Justice Athol Moffitt

The Royal Commission of Inquiry in respect of certain matters relating to allegations of organised crime in clubs also known as the Moffitt Royal Commission (1973–74) was one of the first Australian Royal commissions to specifically investigate the extent and activities of organised crime in the state of New South Wales, Australia. Its common title was taken from the name of its chairperson, NSW Supreme Court judge Athol Moffitt.

== Background ==
In August 1973, the New South Wales Government appointed Mr Justice Moffitt to head the commission. It was set up to address public and media concerns about the growing extent of organised crime in NSW and to investigate specific allegations that the Bally poker machine company now Bally Technologies, -- which was allegedly linked to the Mafia in the United States—was seeking to expand its interests in Australia, and that this might act as a conduit for Mafia-style organised crime to develop and diversify in Australia.

Police investigations into organised crime had been inconclusive, official reports were contradictory and often widely criticised, and both the then NSW Police Commissioner Norman Allan and NSW Premier Robert Askin (who were themselves alleged to have been involved in organised crime) repeatedly denied that there was any sort of organised crime in NSW or that there were any corrupt links between criminals and police or government officials.

Widespread allegations of official corruption in the NSW police force and the NSW government had been highlighted by a string of highly publicised scandals, notably the so-called "Arantz Affair", in which police computer expert Phillip Arantz was sacked from the NSW Police Service for leaking information to the media, after he discovered that the NSW police had systematically under-reporting crime statistics over a period of years. There was also increasing public concern about the escalation of the trade in illegal drugs in NSW in the late 1960s and early 1970s, especially in regard to the rapid growth of the heroin trade.

The first witness called before the commission was investigative journalist Bob Bottom, whose media reports on organised crime had contributed to the growing pressure for a high-level investigation into these matters. Other notable witnesses included career criminal Lenny McPherson, the man typically referred to as Sydney's "Mr Big". Shortly before his death, Justice Moffitt revealed that McPherson (who had since died) had been a paid informant to the commission.

In his final report, handed down in 1974, Justice Moffitt found there was a real danger that organised crime from overseas would infiltrate Australia. He identified the difficulties investigating organised crime presents to law enforcement agencies. Among his recommendations was a "frank and drastic review of the methods of investigation of organised crime of overseas and local origin and that particular procedures be established appropriate to this as a special class of crime"'.

He further recommended that a special squad of police be trained and established to deal with aspects of organised crime and that a 'task force' method be incorporated within this special squad.
