= George Freeman (bookmaker) =

Australian turf accountant and bookmaker (1935–1990)

- George Freeman
- Born: George David Freeman; 22 January 1935; Annandale, New South Wales, Australia
- Died: 20 March 1990 (aged 55); Sydney, New South Wales, Australia
- Occupations: Bookmaker, racing identity, casino operator
- Spouse(s): Marcia Bedford, formerly McDonald (1963-1977); Georgina McLaughlin (1981 - his death)
- Children: 6, 5 sons & 1 daughter
- Parent(s): William David Freeman; Rita Eileen Freeman nee Cooke.
- Conviction: $5000 fine
- Criminal charge: SP bookmaking

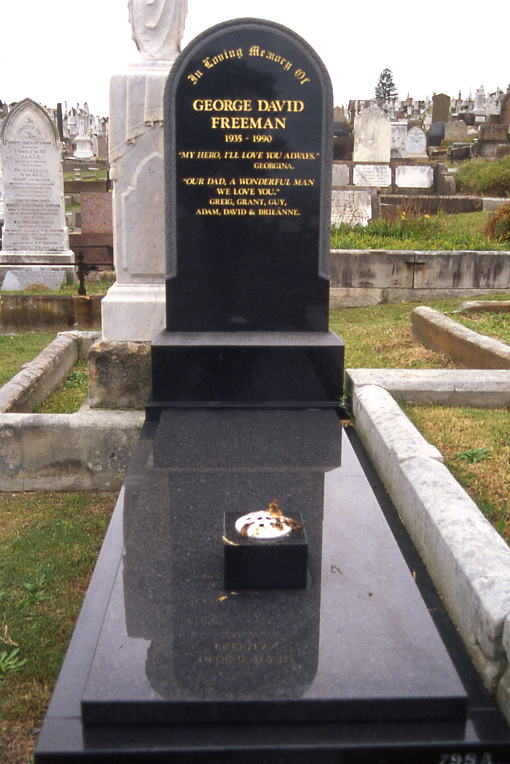
Grave of George Freeman in Waverley Cemetery

George David Freeman (22 January 1935 – 20 March 1990) was an Australian bookmaker, racing identity and illegal casino operator. He was linked to the Sydney drug trade during the 1970s and 1980s, was named in several Royal Commissions into organised crime and had links with American crime figures. Freeman served several prison terms for theft between 1951 and 1968 but was never brought to trial for any of his later alleged crimes, receiving only monetary fines for SP bookmaking in the mid-1980s. Freeman survived a murder attempt in 1979, was married twice, and published an autobiography. He died in 1990 of heart failure related to asthma and pethidine addiction.

== Early life ==
George Freeman was born in Annandale, New South Wales, a suburb of Sydney, to William David Freeman and Rita Eileen Freeman (née Cooke) on 22 January 1935. He was the youngest of three children. Freeman's parents married at Five Dock in 1931. They divorced in 1946.

After his father abandoned the family and his stepfather died, Freeman turned to crime. In 1947, he was arrested for theft. He served two years' probation and left school at 14 to work as a stable hand and earned money hustling. Freeman stated in his 1988 autobiography that his boyhood hero was the notorious Australian criminal Darcy Dugan.

In 1951, he began a sentence for theft offences, serving two years originally at the Mount Penang Training School near Gosford and later at Tamworth Boys' Home. He also served time in Parramatta Gaol for stealing. On 5 February 1963, he married Marcia Bedford, formerly McDonald, in Sydney.

After time in Fremantle Prison in 1968, he travelled to the United States on a false passport and met Chicago-based crime figure Joseph Dan Testa.

== Main career ==
In the 1970s and 1980s, George Freeman was involved in the horse racing industry, primarily as a bookmaker. He was first named in a Royal Commission in 1973 in the Moffit Inquiry into organised crime in Sydney's clubs. Freeman denied involvement. He was later alleged to be part of a plot to bribe State politicians who were planning to set up a casino regulatory board in a bid to curb illegal gambling.

In 1977, Freeman and his wife Marcia divorced. In 1978, he was named in State Parliament as an "organised crime" figure and referred to as a "crime boss" in the Woodward Royal Commission. In 1979, a police report alleged he was involved in illegal bookmaking. On 25 April 1979, he was shot in the neck by an unknown attacker.

In August 1981, Freeman married 24-year-old orthoptist Georgina McLaughlin. He was named in two further Royal Commissions during the 1980s, the Stewart Royal Commission and Street Royal Commission, also known as the Wran Royal Commission, into corruption within the New South Wales Rugby League. During the Street Commission, Freeman admitted he travelled to the USA on a forged passport to visit known Chicago mobster, Joseph Dan Testa, who was also associated with Australian gangster and friend of Freeman's, Lennie McPherson.

In April 1979, an Independent MP for NSW electorate of South Coast, Mr John Hatton, referred to Freeman in Parliament as "the Australian contact man for one Danny Stein, nominated as an associate of notorious American organised crime figures, including Meyer Lansky...".

Despite accusations of murder, assault, race-fixing, bribery, illegal gambling and involvement in the drug trade, Freeman's only criminal convictions after 1967 were for SP bookmaking in 1983 and 1986, resulting in fines of $500 and $5,000. In 1988, his autobiography George Freeman: An Autobiography, was published.

== Death ==
After several years of poor health, suffering from asthma, kidney disease and pethidine addiction, Freeman died of heart failure due to an asthma attack, which was, according to the coroner, linked to his long-standing addiction to pethidine, in Sutherland Hospital, Caringbah on 20 March 1990. He was buried at Waverley Cemetery in Bronte, Eastern Sydney.

== In popular culture ==
In 2009, he was portrayed by Peter O'Brien in the Australian television series Underbelly: A Tale of Two Cities and its sequel Underbelly: The Golden Mile. The series portrayed Freeman as a playboy crime lord, and implied that he was indirectly involved in the Mr Asia drug syndicate, and responsible for the unsolved murder of a hitman, Christopher Flannery.
