= The Red String =

- DVD cover
- Directed by: Elizabeth Pearson
- Release date: 2004
- Running time: 25 minutes
- Country: United States
- Language: English

The Red String is a 2004 documentary film about four adopted Chinese girls and their single mother parents. It was directed by Elizabeth Pearson.
