= Red Thread =

Red Thread may refer to:

== Mythology ==
- Red thread of fate, an East Asian mythological belief
- In Greek mythology, Theseus rescued himself out of the labyrinth of Minotaur by following a red thread, given to him by Ariadne

== Arts and entertainment ==
- The Red Thread (Arab Strap album), 2001
- The Red Thread (Lucy Kaplansky album), 2004
- Red Thread Games, a Norwegian vigeo game developer
- Akai Ito (video game), literally Red Thread, a Japanese video game
- Akai Ito (TV series), a 2008–2009 Japanese television drama

- Akai Ito (film) a 2008 film released together with the television series

== Other uses ==
- Red thread disease, a fungal infection common on grass lawns
- The Red Thread (De Rode Draad), the Dutch advocacy and support group for prostitutes

== See also ==
- Red string (disambiguation)
