= Lenny McPherson =

Australian career criminal (1921–1996)

- Born: Leonard Arthur McPherson; 19 May 1921; Balmain, New South Wales, Australia
- Died: 28 August 1996 (aged 75); Cessnock Gaol, Australia
- Known for: Career criminal
- Parent: Father: Duncan McPherson Mother Emily Reardon

McPherson-Freeman Team
- Years active: 1950s -1990s
- Territory: Sydney
- Ethnicity: White Australians
- Membership: ca. 50 members and associates
- Activities: gambling, extortion, pimping, drug trafficking, contract killings
- Allies: Chicago crime family, Honoured Society, The Carlton Crew
- Rivals: McCann-Domican Gang, Smith-Henry Gang

Leonard Arthur McPherson (born Balmain, New South Wales 19 May 1921; died Cessnock, New South Wales, 28 August 1996) was one of the most notorious and powerful Australian career criminals of the late 20th century. McPherson is believed to have controlled most of Sydney's organised crime activity for several decades, alongside his contemporary Abe Saffron (who was dubbed "Mr Sin") and associate, bookmaker George Freeman.

== Reputation ==
Universally feared by adversaries and often referred to as Sydney's "Mr Big" of organised crime, McPherson built up an extensive network of criminal activities that included robbery, theft and extortion rackets, illegal gambling, "sly-grog shops" (illegal alcohol outlets), prostitution and drug dealing, and his influence is also believed to have extended to South East Asia and the United States.

McPherson's well-earned reputation for extreme brutality is exemplified by an incident recounted in Tony Reeves' 2005 biography. McPherson had been estranged from his mother for many years, but on her 70th birthday, he unexpectedly turned up at her flat, carrying a live rabbit. He demanded to know why he had not been invited to her birthday party, and when she admitted that it was because of his criminal activities, the furious McPherson tore the rabbit's head off, threw the still-twitching body at her feet and stormed off. Reeves also states that McPherson savagely brutalised his first wife on numerous occasions—on one occasion, when he accused her of having an affair, he tied one of her legs to a tree and the other to the back of his car, started the car, took up the slack on the ropes and threatened to tear her in half.

McPherson was featured as a character in the Australian crime drama series Underbelly: A Tale of Two Cities and Underbelly: The Golden Mile, in which he was played by actor John McNeill.

== Youth and early criminal career, 1930s–1940s ==
McPherson was born in the inner-Sydney suburb of Balmain in 1921, the tenth child of metalworker, Duncan McPherson, and his wife, Nellie. He had some schooling at Birchgrove Primary School, but did not go on to secondary school.

McPherson's first brush with the law came at the age of 11 when he was convicted of stealing and placed on a 12-month good behaviour bond. Eighteen months later, on 13 June 1934, he faced court on another stealing offence and his bond was extended for a further year. On 18 June he was convicted on two charges of stealing and committed to the Mount Penang Juvenile Justice Centre. According to Reeves, McPherson was frequently bashed and sexually assaulted during this first term of incarceration, a common experience for juvenile detainees at this time.

During World War II McPherson's father found him a position as a driller at the dockyard where he worked, enabling Lenny to avoid conscription, because dock workers were a protected occupation. During this period he racked up a string of traffic fines for minor infringements including speeding, illegal parking and driving an unlicensed vehicle.

In 1940 McPherson married 16-old Dawn Joy Allan at Rozelle.

McPherson's first criminal convictions as an adult were in 1946. In January he was convicted and fined for possession of stolen goods—a conviction that was upheld on appeal—and a month later, on 15 February, he was found guilty of receiving stolen goods and sentenced to 12 months' hard labour at Long Bay Gaol. Soon after, he was convicted on another similar charge and sentenced to 18 months, to be served concurrently.

In June 1946 McPherson was briefly transferred to a low-security prison farm at Glen Innes in northern NSW, but six weeks later he was transferred to the maximum security Grafton Gaol because of his "unsatisfactory" behaviour. His wife appealed for him to be transferred back to Sydney to serve out his term at Long Bay. Notably, Tom (Thomas) Sheehan, ALP State Member for Cook, also wrote to the Corrective Services Minister on McPherson's behalf, even though McPherson's current home at Gladesville was not in Sheehan's electorate.

Both requests were initially denied, but a few months later McPherson was transferred back to Long Bay to serve out the rest of his sentence. He was paroled on 24 December 1946, having served only 10 months of his 18-month sentence. McPherson had difficulty re-adjusting to life outside prison. He began drinking heavily and soon fell into a pattern of alcohol-fuelled verbal and physical abuse against his long-suffering wife Joy. His marriage quickly deteriorated, and McPherson took up with other women.

During the 1940s he had associated with the Surry Hills based underworld figure, William 'Joey' Hollebone, but they later fell out. Hollebone committed many underworld murders in Sydney and was a close associate of the notorious hitman, John 'Chow' Hayes. After Hollebone was arrested for a robbery, he accused McPherson of tipping off the police to his whereabouts and in revenge Hollebone's gang brutally pack-raped McPherson's mistress, who was pregnant to him. Hollebone died in 1960.

According to Tony Reeves, McPherson had frequently "fizzed" (informed) on fellow inmates while in prison to gain small privileges and ingratiate himself with prison officers. This habit continued after his release, as McPherson began cultivating selected police officers by informing against rivals or those who offended or annoyed him. One contemporary recalled that the young McPherson was widely known at the time as "Lenny The Pig" and "Lenny the Squealer".

On 24 June 1947 McPherson faced a minor charge of using indecent language and was fined £2.

== 1950s ==
By the time of his 30th birthday in 1951, McPherson had developed a fascination with the notorious American gangster Al Capone, reading everything he could find about Capone and trying to emulate him—although, clearly, he had no interest in adopting the Mafia code of silence, omerta and soon developed a close relationship with police, selectively acting as an informant in cases where this suited his purposes.

He made a trip to the United States in August 1951, using a forged passport and travelling under his brother's name; Tony Reeves states that it was on this visit that McPherson made his first contacts with members of the Chicago Outfit. However, his faked passport was detected and he and an accomplice, Martin Goode, were charged with forging and uttering. Although the maximum penalty was 10 years' jail, McPherson and Goode were fined only £100 and placed on a three-year good behaviour bond.

Just five months later, McPherson was again before the courts, charged with consorting with known criminals, but he again escaped imprisonment—his conviction was recorded but no sentence was imposed. McPherson was less fortunate with his next offence: in late 1953 he and an accomplice were arrested while trying to break into an office in central Sydney; in November he was found guilty of breaking and entering with intent to steal and being in possession of housebreaking implements (including explosives) and sentenced to three and a half years in prison.

His term was marked by a number of notable incidents: he was disciplined for attempting to pass a clandestine letter out of the gaol, he was charged with having contraband in his possession, and in mid-1955, while still serving his burglary sentence, he was found guilty on three charges of possessing an unlicensed pistol and sentenced to 12 months on each charge, to be served concurrently with his other term.

McPherson was paroled in October 1955. He needed legitimate employment to satisfy his parole conditions, and it was at this time that he established his infamous "motel". Built by McPherson with his brother, it was, in fact, a group of tiny rooms built on the roof of a private car park in Balmain, which McPherson had created as a safe house for criminal associates who needed to lie low. McPherson placed himself on the payroll at a salary of £20 per week, and for the next 20 years he was able to cover his criminal activities by claiming that the motel was his only source of income.

== Rise to power in the 1960s ==
From the end of the 1950s, McPherson worked assiduously to secure and increase his power and influence and by the late 1960s he had established an extensive network of organised crime operations which were allegedly supported and protected by corrupt police and public officials. He gained pre-eminence in the tough Sydney underworld through the systematic intimidation and assassination of criminal rivals, and by cultivating relationships with corrupt police officers such as Detective Inspector Ray "Gunner" Kelly and the notorious Detective Seargent Fred Krahe. These relationships quickly developed into a mutually beneficial arrangements—corrupt police exploited McPherson as an informant and 'enforcer', while they in turn were used by him to neutralise enemies and to protect his organisation.

Tony Reeves cites the 1959 killing of criminal Joseph Hackett as a pivotal event in McPherson's criminal career. He argues that the case was "fixed" by corrupt police and prison guards, who conspired with McPherson and enabled him to avoid prosecution. From this point on, McPherson's influence over police, prison guards, lawyers, magistrates and politicians allowed him to literally get away with murder on numerous occasions.

=== Murder of Joseph Hackett, 1959 ===
The bullet-riddled body of Joseph George Hackett was found in a laneway in the Inner West suburb of Leichhardt late at night on 27 July 1959. McPherson and his longtime bodyguard, "Snowy" Rayner (alias Lewis William Hunt) were charged with the murder, but according to Tony Reeves, before they could face a trial the case was dropped on the orders of the Attorney General of New South Wales, Reg Downing.

Hackett was led into an ambush by Hilton Mervyn Clayton, another of McPherson's criminal associates. Clayton was arrested only hours after the shooting—although police never revealed how he was picked up so quickly—and after a 14-hour interrogation he allegedly made a "verbal" admission identifying McPherson and Rayner as the killers. Police also located at least two other material witnesses whose evidence could have incriminated McPherson and Rayner. ("Verballing" was a technique resorted to by the New South Wales Police Force in the late 1960s and '70s. A policeman or detective would write a "confession" out and produce it in court unsigned by the defendant.)

Acting on Clayton's admission, detectives Fred Krahe and Les Chowne picked up McPherson and Rayner the next day and questioned them both at length. Significantly, during this first interview, Det. Krahe reportedly revealed to McPherson that it was Clayton who had informed on them. McPherson at first claimed that he had been visiting his mother in hospital when the murder took place, but neither man's alibi stood up, and they were both charged with murder and remanded to Long Bay Gaol.

McPherson had good reason to fear that he would not be allowed out on bail, so during the hours he spent on remand at Long Bay, he allegedly dictated a letter, and then used his influence with a corrupt prison officer known as "The Major" to have it smuggled out of prison and delivered to a trusted associate, Christopher George Campbell. Although not written in McPherson's own hand—Reeves suggests it was transcribed by Rayner—the letter was signed "Lenny" and the contents were highly incriminating. Campbell in fact kept the letter—in 1968 he sold it to journalists from The Australian who were researching a (never-completed) investigation into organised crime. News Limited executives then took possession of it and kept its existence secret for many years, until a copy was leaked to Tony Reeves by an anonymous contact.

The letter bluntly states that Hackett had been killed "because he had a big mouth" and that McPherson and Rayner had "surrendered" to a person referred to as "Verbal"—which, Reeves argues, meant that McPherson had made a deal with Det. Ray Kelly (whose nickname was "Verbal"). It outlines their scheme to avoid prosecution, states that Clayton had already been "seen" by some of Lenny's men and that he would never testify against them, describes the plan to fabricate alibis, details the bribing of two other witnesses by offering them £1500 to leave the country, and gives instructions for Campbell to deposit £400 in the account of solicitor Phil Roach—a well-known criminal lawyer who, Reeves claims, regularly acted as an intermediary between criminals like McPherson and corrupt police such as Krahe and Kelly.

When the pair faced court later that day, Rayner was remanded in custody. Remarkably though, in spite of the seriousness of the charge against McPherson, and his extensive criminal record, magistrate Roy Harvey released him on £1,000 bail and ordered him to report to police three times a week until the Coroner's case began.

The hearing opened on 21 September 1959, but by this time the two "gigs" (witnesses) referred to in Lenny's letter had left the country. Clayton—who had not been seen since the day after the murder—could not be found, so the case was adjourned and McPherson and Rayner were released on bail. Overnight, Clayton was located by DS Fred Krahe, but when the hearing reopened, Clayton recanted on his earlier statement, flatly denying that McPherson and Rayner were the men he had seen on the night Hackett was killed.

Nevertheless, the coroner found that there was a case to answer and McPherson and Rayner were committed to stand trial in November 1959. Bail was refused at this stage, but at a hearing two days later Justice Brereton released both men on £1,000 bail. Before the trial could go ahead, however, the matter was "no-billed" by state Attorney General Reg Downing. In his account of the case, investigative journalist Tony Reeves reported that, years later, an anonymous barrister who claimed to have been privy to "secretive arrangements" between lawyers, police and politicians at the time, had told him that McPherson had "donated" over $10,000 to Downing to assist in his decision.

=== Attempted murder of John Unwin, 1960 ===
In 1960 McPherson and Rayner were charged with the attempted murder of SP bookmaker John Joseph Unwin. The vehicular ambush took place on a busy central Sydney street at mid-evening, and several shots were fired between the two cars as they repeatedly rammed each other, but Unwin managed to return fire, wounding Rayner in the arm, and he escaped without injury. The charges against McPherson were quietly dropped some time later, in part because Unwin refused to cooperate with police.

=== End of first marriage ===
By the early 1960s McPherson's marriage to Dawn Joy had become a sham, and he is known to have had numerous lovers and several children by other women. The end of the marriage was precipitated by a particularly violent attack on his wife in October 1960. After coming home from a drinking binge and discovering that his dinner was not ready, a drunken McPherson savagely pistol-whipped his wife, repeatedly threatened to kill her, and fired shots into the food still cooking on the stove.

Joy was rescued from the house by her father, and she initially agreed with his advice that she should charge her husband with attempted murder. However, at a "conciliation" meeting—arranged and attended by Det. Ray Kelly—she was coerced into dropping the idea. Joy never returned to live with Lenny after the incident, and she subsequently divorced him, signed over her share of their Gladesville home to him, remarried and left Sydney.

In May 1962 McPherson was arrested by two junior detectives for consorting with known criminals, a charge which carried a potential sentence of six months in prison. However, the detectives received a radio order to release McPherson before their car had even arrived at the station, and the two officers involved subsequently stated that the order had come from corrupt detective Ray "Gunner" Kelly.

=== Murder of Robert Walker, 1963 ===
On 9 July 1963 McPherson (then 42) married for the second time to Marlene Carrol Gilligan, 22. That evening, McPherson allegedly slipped away from his own wedding reception at Balmain and carried out the brutal murder of a rival criminal, Robert James "Pretty Boy" Walker, at Randwick, in Sydney's east. Walker had already earned McPherson's displeasure by bragging of being "the toughest man in Sydney" but he was marked for death after he attacked one of McPherson's trusted minders, the notorious Sydney criminal Stan "The Man" Smith (aka Raymond Arthur Owens) – described by Reeves as "a psychotic gunman and drug addict".

Walker had bashed Smith for assaulting a prostitute at a Woolloomooloo hotel; some days later, Smith and several confederates went to Walker's house in Paddington to 'sort him out', but Walker drove them off by firing a salvo of rifle shots through his front door, and one shot wounded Smith in the chest. Walker was charged and he went to ground after the shooting, but he made the mistake of hiding out at the Randwick house of the prostitute Smith had assaulted.

On the evening of the McPherson's wedding reception, at around 6pm, Smith received a call from the prostitute. Smith alerted McPherson, who told his new bride that he had urgent business, and the two men left the reception. They drove to the suburb of Kingsford, changed clothes, picked up a stolen car and drove it to the house where Walker was hiding. They waited until Walker left the woman's house at about 6:15pm, then followed him as he walked down Randwick's main street, Alison Road, on his way to a local pub. Drawing up alongside, McPherson opened fire on Walker at close range with an Owen submachine gun, hitting him six times and killing him instantly; several shots also struck a parked car and a nearby fence.

Although police were on the scene almost immediately, McPherson and Smith made a clean getaway. They dumped the stolen vehicle, and retrieved their own car. After hiding the machine-gun at an associate's welding business, Smith and McPherson changed back into their own clothes, dumped the clothes they had worn during the shooting into the Parramatta River and returned to the wedding reception in Balmain. According to Tony Reeves, the entire operation took just over half an hour.

The case caused a sensation because of the brazen nature of the killing and the fact that it was the first underworld murder in Sydney involving the use of a machine-gun. However the investigation was led by Ray Kelly, who (according to Reeves) pointed the finger of suspicion away from McPherson and directed it at Raymond 'Ducky' O'Connor, another prominent Sydney criminal and a longstanding enemy of McPherson's. The inquest opened in December 1963, and when it resumed in February 1964 O'Connor was called to give evidence. The inquest ended with the coroner finding that he was unable to recommend any prosecution.

Some months later, in 1965, journalists Ron Saw and Frank Brown wrote an article about the case, published in the new satirical magazine Oz in which they alleged that a loose association of prominent Sydney criminals had clubbed together to have Walker killed because of his attempts to establish himself as a standover man.

=== Murder of 'Greyhound' Charlie Bourke, 1964 ===
Only days after the conclusion of the inquest into Walker's murder, McPherson allegedly executed another rival. McPherson had reportedly clashed with standover man and greyhound trainer Charles Bourke over the provision of 'protection' for a new illegal baccarat club in the city, and Bourke had also begun to encroach on the protection rackets McPherson was running on illegal gaming houses in the Newtown area.

McPherson's reprisal was brutal. Bourke was gunned down on the front lawn of his Randwick home in the early hours of the morning of 10 February 1964. Forensic investigations determined that the killer had hidden in nearby bushes and had fired 10 rifle shots into Bourke from a distance, reloaded, then approached the dying man and fired a further 10 shots into him at close range. No-one was ever charged over the killing, but Tony Reeves asserts that sources who had been close to Det. Ray Kelly assured him that there was no doubt that McPherson was the killer, and that Kelly had ensured that McPherson would not fall under suspicion.

=== Murder of Jacky Steele, 1965 ===
The next rival eliminated by McPherson was murderer, safecracker and standover man Robert Lawrence "Jacky" Steele, whose shooting and subsequent death became one of the most celebrated criminal cases of the period. On the evening of 26 November 1965 Steele was fired upon by four men who approached him in a car, while he was walking down a quiet street in the affluent suburb of Woollahra in Sydney's inner east.

He received multiple gunshot wounds—including a shotgun blast that ripped a five-inch hole in his abdomen—but he survived the initial attack and he was able to stagger 200 metres back to his home and drag himself up three flights of stairs to his flat before collapsing. Steele was still conscious when he arrived at St Vincent's Hospital, Sydney, where surgeons removed more than 40 shotgun pellets and bullet fragments from his body.

The wounded Steele survived in hospital for almost a month before finally dying from complications arising from his injuries. In that time he briefly became a media star, and reporters interviewed him in his hospital bed, although one newspaper photographer discovered that Steele, wary of another attempt on his life, was keeping a loaded shotgun at the ready under the sheets.

Steele told a Sunday Mirror reporter that his assailants were able to surprise him by driving up to him in a car that resembled an official police vehicle, and that they were all wearing hats of a style then much favoured by detectives. Tony Reeves speculates Steele may have been falsely told to expect a visit from police with whom he was connected, that McPherson may have used his corrupt police connections to gain the use of a real police vehicle and that the gunmen made eight rehearsal runs for the attack before carrying it out.

Like Charlie Bourke, Steele had incurred Lenny's wrath because he was trying to challenge McPherson's control over inner-city standover rackets, but McPherson's considerable ego also played a part. By Steele's own account, his fate was sealed by a feature in the satirical magazine Oz, entitled "The Oz Guide to Sydney's Underworld", and which was published shortly before the shooting.

Based on information supplied by two Sydney journalists, Oz editor Richard Neville compiled a "Top 20" list of Sydney gangsters. The No. 1 spot was left empty but—in a reference to McPherson—the name "Len" was placed at No. 2, and "Len" was also described as a "fence and a fizz-gig" (police informant). The edition sold out in three days and a delighted Steele reportedly bought 20 copies, making great play of the fact that McPherson was not at No. 1 on the list of top criminals.

It may seem unlikely that a man of McPherson's reputation could be disturbed by an article in a satirical student magazine, but Neville has since revealed that, soon after the "Underworld Guide" was published, he received a visit at his Paddington home from McPherson himself. Lenny explained that had obtained Neville's address from a friend's son, who was at university with Neville. He claimed that he had come to assure himself that the Oz team were not part of a rival gang, and to insist that he was not a "fizz".

In a subsequent edition, Oz delved further into the case when it published the confidential minutes of a monthly meeting of Sydney detectives, held on 1 December. The leaked document revealed that Steele (then still alive in hospital) had named those he believed had carried out the shooting, and that Steele had privately told police that he was sure that McPherson was behind the shooting, and that it had been ordered because of Lenny's fury over the Oz article. The fact that the secret report had been obtained from an underworld source was described by Oz as a "devastating indictment of police".

== The late 1960s and beyond ==
McPherson continued his rise to power through the late 1960s, masterminding the bloody and highly publicized Sydney "gang wars" of the period, during which he allegedly coordinated (and occasionally took part in) the systematic murder of several key rivals. This included the sensational 1967 car-bombing murder of brothel owner Joe Borg, and the killings of his old enemy Ducky O'Connor, and Stewart John Regan. By eliminating his rivals, McPherson became one of the most powerful criminals in Australia; by the end of the 1970s, with corrupt police, prison officers, lawyers and politicians on his payroll, he was able to conduct nearly all of his criminal activities with impunity.

According to biographer Tony Reeves, when it suited him, McPherson acted as an informant to NSW police. In this role, he figured in one of Australia's biggest manhunts, the 1966 search for prison escapees Ronald Ryan and Peter John Walker, who had fled to NSW after a daring escape from Melbourne's Pentridge Prison, during which prison guard George Hodson was killed. Ryan and Walker were eventually captured in the grounds of Concord Repatriation General Hospital in Sydney in a major operation led by Det. Ray "Machine Gun" Kelly. According to Reeves, McPherson was approached by Ryan and Walker, who sought his help to leave the country, but McPherson then arranged a bogus meeting with them at Concord and tipped off the police to their whereabouts. Ryan was subsequently convicted and hanged for the murder of Hodson, becoming the last man in Australia to be executed.

McPherson is also believed to have facilitated the establishment of close contact between key Australian organised crime figures and members of the Chicago Outfit, during the late 1960s. Australian gangsters involved included Ronny Lee, George Freeman and Stan Smith. Perhaps the most notorious of these meetings took place at Sydney, in 1969, during a visit by reputed US mafia hitman Joseph "Dan" Testa, and his associate Nick Giordano. On that occasion, McPherson took Testa and Giordano on a hunting excursion, on which a subsequent feature film Dirty Deeds (2002) was loosely based. The following year, McPherson visited Testa in Chicago.

McPherson is also thought to have been a significant figure in the development of the illegal heroin trade in South-East Asia in the early 1970s.

During the Moffitt Royal Commission into organised crime, an informant alleged that Testa, as a representative of the Mafia, "was conspiring with McPherson and a poker machine company, Bally Manufacturing, to corner the New South Wales market." Testa was later killed in 1981 in a car bomb explosion in a car park near Fort Lauderdale, Florida, USA. McPherson was one of the witnesses called before the commission, which ran from 1973 to 1974.

In 1984 the Gang Wars had started. There were three major gangs: McPherson's Team, Neddy Smith's gang which was backed by Roger Rogerson and there was Barry McCann backed by other police. With a pile of dead bodies, it was back to business.

== Death ==
He was eventually arrested, tried and jailed in the 1990s after ordering the bashing of a business rival. He died of a heart attack in Cessnock Gaol on 28 August 1996, aged 75. He was buried on 3 September 1996 at the Field of Mars Cemetery, Ryde, Sydney.
