= Darcy Dugan =

Australian bank robber (1920–1991)

- Born: 29 August 1920; Sydney, New South Wales
- Died: 22 August 1991 (aged 70); Glebe, New South Wales
- Occupations: Bank robber, prison escape artist
- Spouse: Jan Simmonds
- Status: Commuted to life in prison
- Convictions: Bank robbery, Prison escapee
- Penalty: Death

Darcy Ezekiel Dugan (29 August 1920 – 22 August 1991) was an Australian bank robber and New South Wales' most notorious prison escaper. During his criminal career he committed numerous armed holdups, mostly of banks, but also even of a hospital. However, he became more famous for his daring escapes than for the crimes for which he was convicted.

== Crimes ==
On 4 March 1946, Dugan escaped from a prison tram which was transporting him between Darlinghurst Courthouse and Long Bay jail. As the tram passed the Sydney Cricket Ground, Dugan used a kitchen knife to saw a hole through the roof, through which he escaped. The tram is still kept today at the Sydney Tramway Museum.

On 16 December 1949, Dugan and accomplice William Cecil Mears (1920–2002) both escaped from Central Police Station, Sydney, during a court recess. Mears was in court after being charged with possession of an unlicensed pistol and had subpoenaed Dugan as a witness. During an adjournment for lunch, Dugan and Mears hacksawed through an iron bar in their cell and escaped from the police complex and onto the streets of Sydney. Police gave chase, but the two were last seen as they jumped onto a passing tram.

In 1950, Dugan was sentenced to death, along with a co-offender. An appeal against sentence failed but Cabinet later commuted the sentences to life imprisonment.

After another prison escape, Dugan reportedly left behind a note scrawled on the wall of his cell which read, "Gone to Gowings." The reference to Sydney department store's advertising slogan was slang for many things including "left in haste".

== Final years ==
Dugan served a total of 35 years in prison, exactly half of his life. He served his final prison sentence at Long Bay Correctional Centre and was released on parole in 1984. Dugan worked as a rehabilitation officer during his final years of freedom until his health declined.

In the 1980s, he became a campaigner for prison reform and exposing corruption, living in a prisoners' half way house in Glebe. In 1980, Darcy married Jan Simmonds, who he had met in prison while she was researching a book about her brother Kevin Simmonds, famous for being an escapee and fugitive in the late 1950s. Although they separated not long after, they remained friends and Jan looked after Darcy when his health began to fail upon his final release from prison.

His autobiographical book Bloodhouse was published posthumously, in 2012.

== Death ==
Dugan died in the Sydney suburb of Glebe from Parkinson's disease on 22 August 1991. He was buried at Rookwood Catholic Cemetery on 29 August 1991 on what would have been his 71st birthday.
