= Dulcie Markham =

Australian prostitute

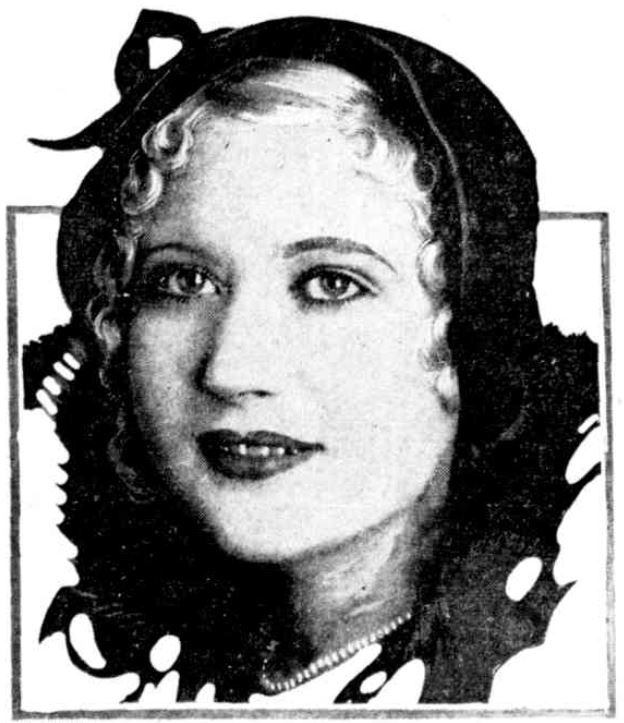
- Photograph of Markham, c. 13 May 1931
- Born: Dulcie May Markham; 27 February 1914; Surry Hills, Sydney, Australia
- Died: 20 April 1976 (aged 62); Bondi, Sydney, Australia
- Burial place: Eastern Suburbs Memorial Park
- Other names: The Angel of Death; The Black Widow; Pretty Dulcie; Bad Luck Doll; The One-Way Ticket
- Occupations: Prostitute, underworld figure
- Years active: 1929–1972

Dulcie May Markham (27 February 1914 – 20 April 1976) was a prominent Sydney prostitute and associate of gangland figures in Sydney during the 1930s, 1940s and 1950s. She was later on closely involved with the razor gang milieu of that era of organised crime within that city. During her criminal career, she had amassed 100 convictions in New South Wales, Victoria, Queensland and Western Australia for prostitution, vagrancy, consorting, assaulting police and the public, keeping a brothel, drunkenness, and drunk driving, and was sent to prison on numerous occasions. Markham was known in the media as The Angel of Death, The Black Widow, Pretty Dulcie, Australia's most beautiful bad woman, Bad Luck Doll, and The One-Way Ticket.

Markham had been described variously as 'beautiful platinum blonde', 'innocent face and baby-blue eyes', and 'ravishing figure', and 'tall, curvaceous, slim-ankled, creamy complexioned... glamor girl of the demi-monde, attractive even to a husky voice'.

The Daily Mirror, a former Sydney newspaper, summed up her career in crime thus: "Dulcie Markham saw more violence and death than any other woman in Australia's history".

== Early life ==
Dulcie May Markham was born in the inner city Sydney suburb of Surry Hills on 27 February 1914 to John Markham and Florence Millicent née Parker.

She became one of Australia's most notorious prostitute and underworld figures. She became a prostitute when she was only aged 15 and Sydney's most extravagant gangster's moll by the time she was age 18. She was attracted to, and associated with, many major criminals of the era.

== Notable criminal liaisons ==
On 13 May 1931, in William Street, Sydney, stallkeeper Alfred Dillon and 21-year-old gunman Cecil "Scotty" McCormack came to blows over the attentions of Markham and in the resultant melee, Dillon stabbed McCormack to death. She was present at the time. Markham and McCormack were planning to marry.

Her first marriage was to a sideshow worker and small-time mobster Frank Bowen in Brisbane on 4 March 1936. Two months later, aged 21, Markham (as Bowen) was in court accused of falsifying a telegram on behalf of her new husband.

By 1936, Markham was involved with Guido Caletti, another notorious Sydney gunman, the then-husband of Nellie Cameron, another prominent Sydney sex worker of that period. Caletti was shot dead in August 1939 in Sydney at a party he attended with Markham. Reportedly, Markham was grief-stricken at his funeral.

By December 1937, Markham had shifted to Melbourne and now had gunman Arthur Taplin as her pimp and lover. Taplin was subsequently shot dead later that year.

By mid-1940, the 24-year-old 'prettiest and most notorious woman in the Australian underworld' was romantically involved with 26-year-old Fred Erick James 'Paddles' Anderson, and once divorced, was going to marry him (being still married to Bowen); where she was also nicknamed the 'Hoodoo Girl' given of three previous lovers, one had been stabbed, and two shot. In the same year her first husband, Frank Bowen, was shot and killed in Kings Cross. (Note: No newspaper article for 1940 has been located about the shooting of Frank Bowen; only mentioned without detail in articles of later years.)

In 1943, Markham relocated to Queensland's Gold Coast to take advantage of the influx of American GIs. When picked up for vagrancy by local police, 'Pretty Dulcie' protested that she lived with her current de facto husband, taxi-driver (J)ames Arthur Williams, and that while he gave her money and groceries, she was not involved in the local sex industry at that time, and was not aware of Williams' involvement in the sly-grog or bootleg alcohol distribution networks that flouted wartime beer and spirits rationing mandates. She also used the pseudonyms and aliases: "Dulcie Williams", "Dulcie Bowen", "Tosca de Marquis", "Mary Eugene", and "Tosca de Merene" during that period. In September 1945, her then-boyfriend and leading Melbourne criminal Leslie Walkerden, was shot dead in Richmond, Victoria.

In 1947 aged 30, Markham was accused and stood trial for conspiracy to murder Valma Hull, the wife of Keith Kitchener Hull, who had shot and killed another Sydney gangland figure, Donald "The Duck" Day, in January 1945. Markham and Edwin Martin, her current liaison, had visited a boarding house owned by Mrs Hull and had demanded to see her. Charges were later dropped when another pair of local gunmen, Charles Martin and George Barrett, were charged with an attack on Hull, but also acquitted a month later.

On 25 September 1951, Markham was shot in the hip at a wild party that turned violent in St Kilda, Victoria. Her then-boyfriend, and ex-boxer, Gavan Thomas Walsh was shot and killed at the same party. Three months later, while still recovering from the shooting, she married Leonard "Redda" Lewis, who was later shot in Melbourne on 22 April 1952. They didn't live together again and were later divorced.

Markham faced Central Police Court for soliciting one final time in 1957 before retiring from prostitution. In January 1959, Markham stood before a special Federal Court on a charge of not having filed a tax return for 1957. She was found guilty and fined £50 with £1 costs.

== Later years ==
Markham married Martin Rooney in 1972 in Sydney (according to her death certificate), and gave up her criminal career. After this period, little more is known about Markham's subsequent life, until her death in a house fire at her home at 12 Moore Street, Bondi on 20 April 1976. Markham had outlived most of her criminal contemporaries from Sydney's tempestuous razor gang era. Markham's funeral was held at St Patrick's Catholic Church, Bondi and the eulogy was given by Detective Frank "Bumper" Farrell. She was cremated at Eastern Suburbs Memorial Park.

In 2009, Markham was one of the figures from that era featured in an exhibition about that era at Sydney's Justice and Police Museum, entitled "Femmes Fatales: The Female Criminal."

== See also ==
- Tilly Devine
- Kate Leigh
