= George Amsberg =

Barrister and judge in New South Wales, Australia

George Frederick Amsberg
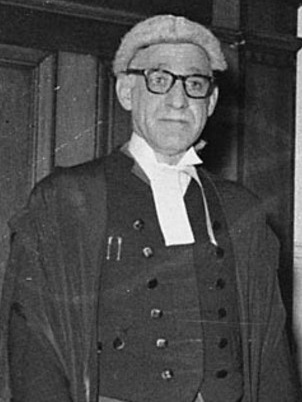
- Judge George Amsberg Q.C.

Judge of the District Court of New South Wales
- In office 15 October 1952 – June 1968

Personal details
- Born: 15 June 1905 Woollahra, New South Wales
- Died: 25 November 1980 (aged 75) Southport, Queensland
- Spouse: Agnes (née Plate)
- Education: Fort Street Boys' High School
- Alma mater: University of Sydney

George Frederick Amsberg (15 June 1905 – 25 November 1980) was an Australian barrister and judge of the District Court of New South Wales. He was a prominent member of the Sydney Jewish community. In his legal practice Amsberg defended some of Sydney's most high-profile criminals. In 1953, after becoming a judge, Amsberg was appointed as a Commissioner to preside over the highly political Royal Commission of Inquiry into the conduct of Joshua Arthur, a New South Wales government minister.

== Biography ==
=== Early life ===
George Amsberg was born on 15 June 1905 at Woollahra, New South Wales, the son of Frederick Amsberg and Alice (née Abrahams). His father was a pawnbroker with a shop in Enmore-road, Enmore.

Amsberg received his secondary education at Fort Street Boys' High School. He attended Sydney University and graduated with a Bachelor of Laws in 1926, with first-class honours and sharing the University Medal with Garfield Barwick (later Chief Justice of Australia).

=== Legal practice ===
Amsberg was admitted as a Barrister in February 1928. During the 1930s and early 1940s Amsberg "acquired a leading practice as junior counsel". He was known as "a formidable cross-examiner", with a quick mind and "a capacious memory".

On 2 February 1938 Amsberg was cross-examining a witness named Victor Whitley in the Workers' Compensation Court, when the witness said to Amsberg, "I was one of the first Diggers who entered Jerusalem. Where were you?". The barrister angrily retorted to Whitley "that he would see him outside afterwards" and added, "I won't stand insults from anyone".

In 1940 Amsberg was living in Victoria Road, Bellevue Hill. George Amsberg and Agnes Plate were married on 3 July 1940 in a Jewish ceremony at the Temple Emanuel, Maccabean Hall in Darlinghurst-road, Darlinghurst.

=== War service ===
Amsberg served in the Royal Australian Naval Volunteer Reserve (RANVR) during World War II (from August 1942 to February 1945). He served on vessels engaged in minesweeping operations and the transportation of troops in New Guinea. Amsberg was promoted to the rank of lieutenant in December 1942.

=== Legal practice resumed ===
After the war ended many servicemen returning to practice at the Bar found great difficulty in obtaining chambers or suitable rooms, despite efforts by the Bar Council to remedy the situation and give priority to returned men. After his discharge in February 1945 Amsberg resumed his practice, finding a room in the University Chambers at 167 Phillip Street. Described as "one of the leaders of the junior Bar before he joined the Navy", Amsberg's accommodation was initially sub-standard, having to interview clients and solicitors in a very small room on the premises.

In the late 1940s and early 1950s Amsberg took on well-known Sydney criminals as clients, including John 'Chow' Hayes and William 'Joey' Hollebone, defending them in a number of high-profile cases. Chow Hayes later recalled that George Amsberg was amongst a number of Sydney lawyers who often attended Thommo's two-up school in Surry Hills, where both Hayes and Hollebone worked. Hayes claimed that Amsberg "knew everything there was to know about gambling and sly grog around Sydney"; he and Hollebone would sometimes drink with Amsberg "at old Kate Leigh's place and other dives". Amsberg sometimes sought advice from Hayes; "if an ordinary crim was pinched for something like house-breaking and sought Amsberg's representation, old George would send for me or Hollebone to check him out first – that is, to ensure he was a good fellow who knew how to mind his own business". Hayes claimed it was a common practice at that time for lawyers in Sydney to charge a larger amount than the receipt they issued to their client.

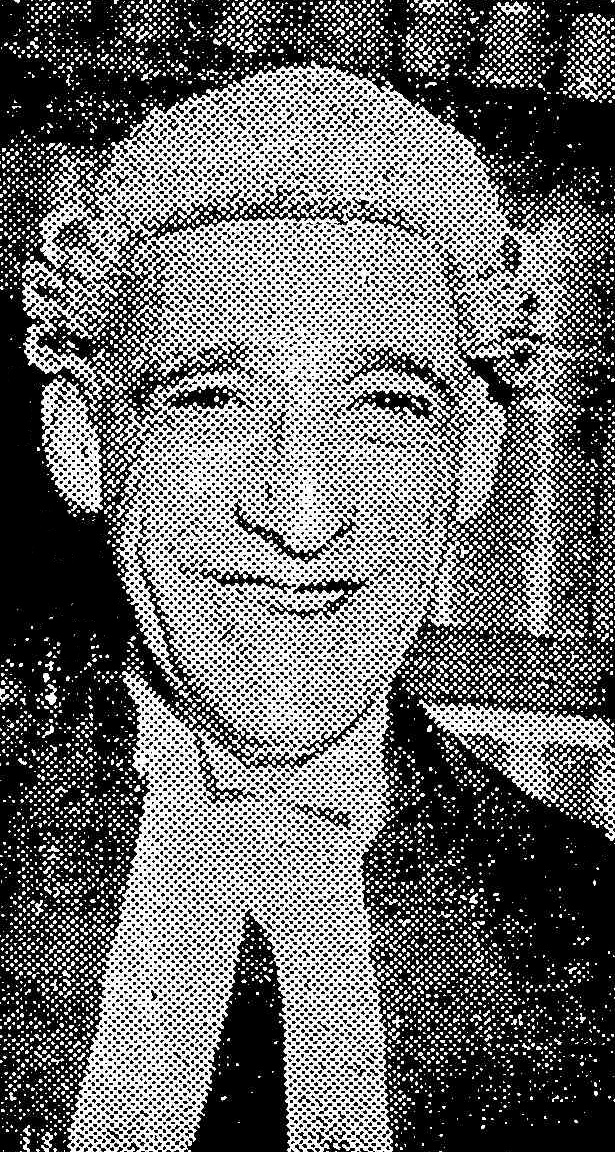
George Amsberg, photographed in 1952.

Amsberg was appointed a Queens Counsel in April 1951.

=== District Court judge ===
On 15 October 1952 Amsberg was appointed as a judge of the District Court of New South Wales.

In March 1953 Amsberg was appointed as sole commissioner to conduct the Royal Commission to inquire into and report upon whether Joshua Arthur, a New South Wales Government minister, "acted corruptly or improperly in any association or dealing" with Reginald Doyle (and other related matters). It was revealed that Amsberg had been chosen after the Chief Justice, Kenneth Street, had refused to make a Supreme Court judge available to preside at the Commission because of "the state of the law list" and the absence overseas of one judge. The Chairman of the District Court Bench was then approached, and Judge Amsberg was suggested for the role.

From about June 1953 Amsberg regularly appeared as a 'Brains Trust' panellist, public events organised by the YMHA (Young Men's Hebrew Association) and through the Temple Emanuel. Brains Trust events involved an expert panel with diverse backgrounds assembled to answer questions previously submitted by members of the public.

=== Retirement ===
Amsberg retired as a District Court judge in June 1968 and went to live at Broadbeach on the Queensland Gold Coast.

In June 1969 Amsberg was appointed as an Electoral Districts Commissioner to assist in carrying out a redistribution of electorates prior to the New South Wales State election in 1971.

George Amsberg died on 25 November 1980 at Southport, Queensland, aged 75 years. His obituary in the Australian Law Journal concluded with the following words: "He will always be remembered as one of the most colourful legal personalities of his time in Sydney, and for his kindness, friendliness and generosity on all occasions".
