= Underbelly: Razor =

- Starring: Chelsie Preston Crayford, Danielle Cormack
- No. of episodes: 13

Release
- Original network: Nine Network
- Original release: 21 August – 6 November 2011

Series chronology
- ← Previous; The Golden Mile Next → Badness

Underbelly: Razor, the fourth series of the Australian Nine Network crime drama anthology series Underbelly, originally aired from 21 August 2011 to 6 November 2011. It is a thirteen-part series detailing real events that occurred in Sydney between 1927 and 1936. The series depicts the "razor gangs" who controlled the city's underworld during the era and the violent war between the two "vice queen" powers, Tilly Devine and Kate Leigh. It is also the last season in the Underbelly franchise that contains 13 episodes. In contrast to the previous Underbelly instalments, which were based on books by John Silvester and Andrew Rule, Razor is based on the Ned Kelly Award-winning book of the same name, written by Larry Writer.

== Synopsis ==
Razor is set during the "Roaring Twenties" and 1930s, mainly between 1927 and 1936 in Sydney, when organised crime in Australia became more prominent. The series details the story of the bloody battle between the era's most feared "vice queens", Tilly Devine and her rival Kate Leigh, plus the "razor gangs" which controlled the Sydney underworld during that time. Embroiled in the violence is the country's young police force and a young girl called Nellie Cameron, determined to lose her innocence and destined to become the most famous prostitute in the land.

== Episodes ==
No. overall	No. in series	Title	Directed by	Written by	Original release date
40	1	"The Worst Woman in Sydney"	Tony Tilse	Peter Gawler	21 August 2011
In 1927, after Tilly Devine steals Kate Leigh's Pomeranian dog they become sworn enemies. Nellie Cameron and Frank Green join Tilly and Jim Devine's team hoping to become successful in their chosen professions. Norman Bruhn arrives from Melbourne hoping to become the new leader of the Sydney underworld.
41	2	"Whips and Scorpions"	Tony Tilse	Peter Gawler	21 August 2011
Norman surrounds himself with a few thugs and attempts to disrupt Tilly and Kate's respective businesses. Later he arms himself and his gang with cut throat razors and attack Sid Kelly in an alleyway.
42	3	"Cat Amongst the Pigeons"	Cherie Nowlan	Felicity Packard	28 August 2011
Norman Bruhn's Razor Gang pushes the underworld to crisis point, threatening the crime empires of Kate, Tilly and Phil Jeffs. Amid public outrage, the police fight a losing battle to stop rival Razor Gangs terrorising the streets. The rival underworld bosses convene a summit to deal with Bruhn's gang, but are betrayed when Tilly takes matters into her own hands. After being rejected by Nellie and taunted by his rivals, Frank Green finally gets his chance to shine.
43	4	"The Damage Done"	Cherie Nowlan	Felicity Packard	4 September 2011
Furious over Tilly's decision to kill Norman Bruhn, Kate sparks an all-out war by recruiting Tilly's prostitutes to sell cocaine. Snowy Cutmore returns to Melbourne for a fateful showdown with crime boss Squizzy Taylor. Fresh from his first kill, Frank Green wins the ultimate prize – Nellie Cameron.
44	5	"The Darlinghurst Outrage"	Shawn Seet	Michaeley O'Brien	11 September 2011
Phil Jeffs is charged with the rape of Ida Maddocks, apparent house-wife and mother-of-two. It is a capital offence and Kate and Tilly hope that he is hanged so that one of them can monopolise the cocaine trade. It becomes a well known court case within the popular press. Jeffs and his lawyer devise a defamatory argument to suggest Ida is a prostitute. As it turns out, she is as Lillian Armfield knows, but despite the initial consent she still sees it as rape. Phil Jeffs and his two accomplices are found not guilty of the criminal charges.
45	6	"Blood Alley"	Shawn Seet	Michaeley O'Brien	18 September 2011
The rivalry between Kate Leigh and Phil Jeffs over the cocaine supply reaches boiling point as Jeffs decides to harass Kate and Tilly's activities. This culminates in a legendary street battle between the two crime lords. The police start surveillance on Kate and the drug activities. After surviving a hit by Kate's associates, Jeffs relocates up to Newcastle while Kate is arrested for harbouring thieves by the police, leaving Tilly free to expand her empire.
46	7	"Tripe and Brains"	David Caesar	Jeff Truman	25 September 2011
With Kate in prison, Wally Tomlinson faces an uphill battle to maintain and protect Kate's business and family interests as Tilly decides to buy into Kate's empire. Nellie Cameron is confronted by her father to return home, and Guido Caletti faces off against a male singer who is smitten and in love with Nellie.
47	8	"A Big Shivoo"	David Caesar	Jeff Truman	2 October 2011
Frank Green sparks tension between Tilly and Kate's razor gangs as Wally desperately tries in vain to keep the peace between them and within Kate's group, culminating into another violent street battle. An imprisoned Kate frets about her daughter Eileen's upcoming wedding while Tilly falls pregnant.
48	9	"The Crash"	Mat King	Michaeley O'Brien	9 October 2011
As the Depression draws near, Kate places a bounty on the heads of Frank Green and Jim Devine, which Tilly retaliates by ordering Frank and Jim to get Kate's men first. Frank shoots Barney Dalton dead and injures Wally Tomlinson. Kate is forced to take action after discovering the truth about her son-in-law, which threatens to drive her daughter Eileen away.
49	10	"The Sentimental Bloke"	Mat King	Felicity Packard	16 October 2011
Wally becomes an outcast after giving evidence incriminating Frank Green for the murder of Barney. Big Jim Devine tries to hide his cowardice from the rest of Razorhurst while Kate Leigh shoots to kill when she becomes the victim of a home invasion. Wally Tomlinson returns to the bush where he grew up, to never see Kate Leigh again.
50	11	"Jerusalem Revisited"	Shawn Seet	Jeff Truman	23 October 2011
Tilly decides to return to England which will have dire consequences for her business and marriage. With Tilly gone, Kate moves in to seize control of the cocaine market, with some help and later betrayed by the newly-released Guido Caletti.
51	12	"Big Moves"	David Caesar	Michaeley O'Brien	30 October 2011
Jim Devine faces the noose for the attempted murder of his wife Tilly. Hoping to escape Razorhurst, Frank Green and Nellie Cameron flee to Queensland for a new life. Kate moves in to turn Tilly's gang on each other. Meanwhile Bill Mackay and his police force faces a new problem to prevent political uprisings occurring between the fascist New Guard and the communist Wharfies.
52	13	"Armageddon"	Shawn Sheet	Felicity Packard	6 November 2011
After a decade of gang warfare that finally led to the fatal shooting of an innocent bystander, Kate and Tilly face each other off in their final showdown. Phil Jeffs returns from exile and vows to drive Kate Leigh out of business, eventually to no avail. Frank and Guido fight to the death for the final time over the love of Nellie Cameron.

== Cast ==
=== Main cast ===
- Danielle Cormack as Kate Leigh, rival of the Devines and sly grog queen
- Chelsie Preston Crayford as Tilly Devine, brothel madam
- Anna McGahan as Nellie Cameron, a notorious prostitute embroiled in the violence of the era
- Jack Campbell as 'Big Jim' Devine, Tilly Devine's husband
- John Batchelor as Wally Tomlinson, business associate and boyfriend of Kate Leigh
- Khan Chittenden as Frank 'The Little Gunman' Green, notorious criminal and assassin
- Richard Brancatisano as Guido Calletti, feared gangland figure and Nellie Cameron's first husband
- Craig Hall as Detective Inspector Bill Mackay, part of the country's young police force
- Lucy Wigmore as Lillian May Armfield, one of Australia's first policewomen
- Steve Le Marquand as Sergeant Tom Wickham, a member of New South Wales' first drug 'squad'

=== Recurring and guest cast ===
- Jeremy Lindsay Taylor as Norman Bruhn, the era's most feared standover man
- Justin Rosniak as Leslie 'Squizzy' Taylor, Bruhn's Melbourne-based rival
- Felix Williamson as Phil 'The Jew' Jeffs, infamous gangster
- Lincoln Lewis as Bruce Higgs, associate and lover of Kate Leigh
- Pippa Grandison as Mona Woods, singer at one of Kate Leigh's sly-grog shops
- Catherine Glavicic as May Seckold, an employee of Kate Leigh.
- Conrad Coleby as Constable Wharton 'Syd' Thompson, the other half of Sydney's first drug squad
- Guy Edmonds as Greg 'The Gunman' Gaffney, an associate of vice-queen Kate Leigh
- David Willis as Bill 'The Octopus' Flanagan, an associate of Kate Leigh
- Rel Hunt as William Archer, bathhouse proprietor and part of the razor gangs
- Matt Boesenberg as John "Snowy" Cutmore, standover man
- Adam Tuominen as Frank 'Razor Jack' Hayes, member of Bruhn's gang
- Pacharo Mzembe as 'Nigger', a gangster. (Redubbed 'Nugget' for the Underbelly: Razor – Uncut DVD release).
- Jessica Mauboy as Gloria Starr, the Fifty-Fifty Club singer
- Rob Mills as Eric Connolly, a jazz club singer
- Saskia Burmeister as Ida Maddocks, the main rape victim and primary witness in the "Darlinghurst Outrage" case
- Emily Rose Brennan as 'Black' Aggie, one of Tilly Devine's prostitutes. Begins a relationship with Greg 'The Gunman' Gaffney
- Rick Donald as Barney Dalton, rugby player employed by Kate Leigh and murdered by Frank Green.
- Guy Spence as Sid 'Kicker' Kelly, hardened criminal and one half of the Kelly brothers
- Clint Foster as Tom Kelly, the other half of the Kelly brothers
- Caleb Alloway as Constable Keith Sullivan, crime fighter
- T.J. Power as H. L Jones, news reporter
- Anna Lawrence as Irene Bruhn, wife of Norman Bruhn
- Tasman and Rex Palazzi as Noel and Keith Bruhn, toddler sons of Norman Bruhn
- Grant Garland as Charles Connors, gangster and 'razor-man'
- Izzy Stevens as Eileen Leigh, daughter of Kate Leigh
- Jamie Kristian as Albert Duke, Englishman and husband of Eileen Leigh
- Troy Planet as George 'The Midnight Raper' Wallace, violent member of Bruhn's gang
- Jake Ryan as Constable Ray 'The Blizzard' Blissett, crusading policeman
- Felix Jozeps as Ernest Wilson, Phil Jeffs' driver and gangster
- Kim Knuckey as Fred Moffitt, taxi driver
- Rachel Rowlatt as Phyllis, housekeeper of the Devines
- Adele Vuko as Gwynnie, a prostitute working for Tilly Devine
- Kelly Anderson as Peg, a prostitute working for Tilly Devine
- Ben Purser as Herbert 'Pal' Brown, Kate Leigh's short-lived lieutenant
- Larry Writer as TBA, a wealthy businessman who frequents Kate Leigh's nightclubs
- Daniel Matthew Beltran as Percy Cook, member of Guido Calletti's gang
- James Pope as John 'Snowy' Prendergast, aspiring razor gang member
- Ky Baldwin as Eddie 'the Urchin', lookout and messenger for Leigh
- Don Rogers as Edward Brady, small-time criminal
- William Upjohn as Roy 'the Butcher', a butcher and barman for one of Kate Leigh's sly grog shops
- Will Ward as Ralph the Barman, barkeep for the tavern frequented by most of the razor gangs
- Mehmet Yanuz as Rabbitoh, Rabbit peddler
- Arianwen Parkes-Lockwood as Dolly Green, wife of Frank 'The Little Gunman' Green
- Lizzie Schebesta as Guido Calletti's moll Dulcie Markham
- David Roberts as Frank de Groot, leader of the New Guard
- Jessica De Gouw as Constable Edie McElroy, one of the first policewomen after Lillian Armfield
- Jim Holt as Thomas Bavin, New South Wales premier
- Graeme Blundell as Jack Lang, infamous NSW premier
- Denise Roberts as Alice Twiss

== Ratings ==
The premiere episode made Razor the highest rating drama in Australian history, surpassing the record set by Underbelly: A Tale of Two Cities.

Episode		Original air date	Timeslot	Viewers (millions)	Timeslot rank	Nightly rank	Weekly rank
1	"The Worst Woman in Sydney"	21 August 2011	8:30 pm Sunday	2.794	1	3	3
2	"Whips and Scorpions"	21 August 2011	9:30 pm Sunday	2.084	1	5	5
3	"Cat Amongst the Pigeons"	28 August 2011	8:30 pm Sunday	1.760	1	1	1
4	"The Damage Done"	4 September 2011	8:30 pm Sunday	1.550	1	2	4
5	"The Darlinghurst Outrage"	11 September 2011	8:30 pm Sunday	1.461	1	3	4
6	"Blood Alley"	18 September 2011	8:30 pm Sunday	1.408	1	2	8
7	"Tripe and Brains"	25 September 2011	8:30 pm Sunday	1.397	1	1	5
8	"A Big Shivoo"	2 October 2011	8:30 pm Sunday	1.290	1	3	5
9	"The Crash"	9 October 2011	8:30 pm Sunday	1.282	1	3	8
10	"The Sentimental Bloke"	16 October 2011	8:30 pm Sunday	1.336	1	3	10
11	"Jerusalem Revisited"	23 October 2011	8:30 pm Sunday	1.237	1	1	13
12	"Big Moves"	30 October 2011	8:30 pm Sunday	1.296	1	2	9
13	"Armageddon"	6 November 2011	8:30 pm Sunday	1.449	1	1	2
