= William 'Joey' Hollebone =

Australian gangster

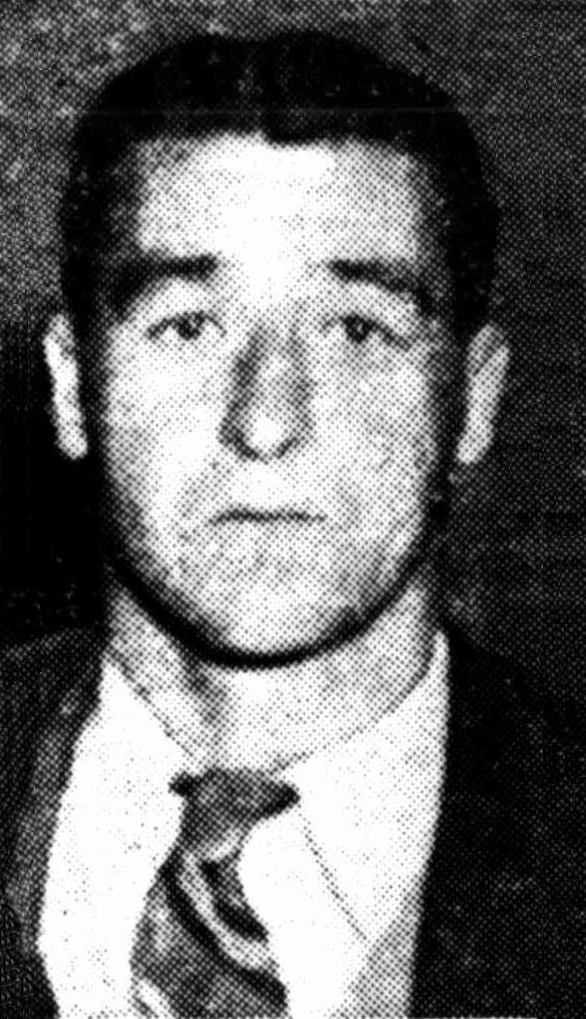
- William 'Joey' Hollebone.
- Born: William Joseph Hollebone; 1 January 1917; St Peters, New South Wales
- Died: 28 September 1960 (aged 43); Darlinghurst, New South Wales
- Occupation: Criminal

William Joseph Hollebone (1 January 1917 – 28 September 1960), known informally as 'Joey' Hollebone, was a notorious and violent member of the criminal underworld, based in the inter-city suburbs of Sydney, Australia. Hollebone began serving a decade-long sentence for manslaughter in 1935, during which he met 'Chow' Hayes. From the mid-1940s to the mid-1950s Hollebone and Hayes were the best-known and feared of Sydney's criminal gunmen, with newspapers regularly reporting on their nefarious activities.

== Biography ==
=== Early life ===
William Joseph Hollebone was born on 1 January 1917 at St. Peters in inner-city Sydney, the son of Sydney Hollebone and Mary (née Ludwell). His father was a bootmaker who had enlisted in the Australian Imperial Force. Sydney Hollebone embarked on a troopship for England shortly after William's birth; he was briefly mobilised to France but was hospitalised for an inguinal hernia and returned to Australia in October 1918. He was discharged as medically unfit in March 1919. William was the fourth-born of eight children in the Hollebone family. His mother, Mary Hollebone, died in 1926, shortly after the birth of her last child.

In 1927 the family were living at 11 Hutchinson Street, St. Peters. On 13 July 1927 William's younger brother, seven-year-old Augustus Hollebone, and two other neighbourhood boys were drowned in a water-filled disused brick pit in May Street, St Peters. The boys had been paddling about on an improvised wooden raft, when it overturned.

In 1933, Hollebone, aged 16 years, was bought before the courts for stealing and placed on twelve months' probation.

=== Manslaughter conviction ===
At Newtown Court in January 1935 Hollebone was released on a twelve months' bond "for having goods in custody".

On the afternoon of 7 October 1935 Hollebone and two companions, James Charters and Edward Smith, were involved in a street brawl in King Street, Newtown, that resulted in the death of a 39-year-old greengrocer, Leslie Hobson. The fight started when a cyclist named Albert Brown was in the process of mounting his bicycle when he was pushed in the back by Smith. The two began exchanging punches, with Smith's companions joining in. Brown wrestled one of his assailants to the ground and was hit by a bottle and kicked in the ribs and head. At that point Alfred Lalor and Leslie Hobson emerged from a nearby hotel and "saw a young man lying in the gutter, with three or four men about him, who appeared to be kicking him". Hobson called out: "Cut it out. Give him a fair go". As the two men approached the melée, Lalor was knocked to the ground and kicked in the head. Hobson began to fight with Hollebone and his companions. A witness to the events described "a running fight across the street" with bottles being thrown. Hobson fell, after having tripped on the kerb or been knocked down. The witness described how two of the attackers, "as quick as lightning", kicked Hobson in the side of the head, one on each side. A sound "like a crack, or a slap" was heard as they kicked him. After the vicious attack on Hobson the three men ran away.

An inquest was held at the City Coroner's Court investigating the death of Leslie Hobson on 30 and 31 October 1935. At the conclusion of the evidence the City Coroner found that Hobson had "died from injuries feloniously and maliciously inflicted" by Hollebone, Charters and Smith. He expressed the view that "the kicking of a defenceless man on the head while he was lying on the roadway is an act that, if it was not intended to kill, was intended to inflict serious grievous bodily harm, and that comes on to the legal definition of murder". The Coroner committed the three men for trial, acknowledging that the question of whether the crime was one of murder or manslaughter, if the men were found guilty, was for the jury to determine.

The trial began on 26 November 1935 in the Central Criminal Court, with Hollebone, Charters and Smith each pleading not guilty to murder charges. In his opening statement the Senior Crown Prosecutor left open the possibility that the jury might reduce the crime to one of manslaughter. In evidence for the defence, each of the accused men denied they had kicked Hobson. On the following day the jury returned a verdict of manslaughter against each of the accused. On November 29 Justice Halse Rogers sentenced Hollebone, Charters and Smith each to ten years' penal servitude for the manslaughter of Leslie Hobson. The defence counsel had asked the judge to extend leniency "on the grounds of their youth, and the fact that there had been some provocation". However, Halse Rogers was unmoved; in passing sentence he remarked that "the cowardliness and brutality of the final assault could scarcely be exaggerated", adding, "while it was a very serious thing to send three youths to gaol for such a term, it would be more serious... if such crimes as that were dealt with lightly". The judge observed that "the evidence in the case revealed something of the old 'push' activity and against any revival of such tactics and terrorism the community must be protected".

While 'Joey' Hollebone was serving his sentence in Parramatta Gaol he met John 'Chow' Hayes and the two men formed a partnership that would last until Hollebone's death.

=== The war years ===
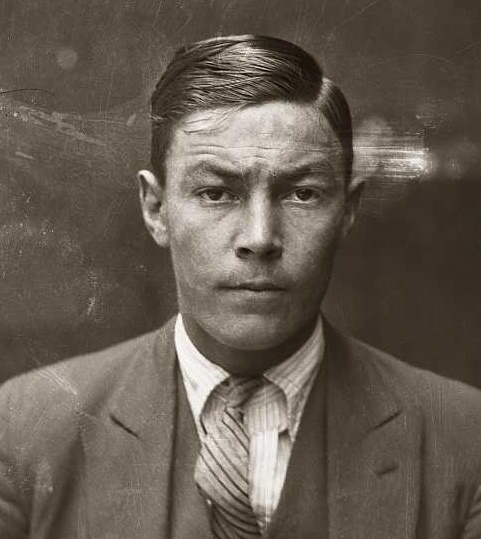
John 'Chow' Hayes, photographed at the Central Police Station, Sydney, in November 1930.

By late 1943 Hollebone had been released from prison. In January 1944 he was brought before the Central Criminal Court where he was charged with consorting with criminals and placed on a bond under the provisions of Section 556A of the Crimes Act (which allowed for the discharging the offender conditionally without proceeding to conviction).

Hollebone married Hazel Jean Ryan (née Britt) in early 1944. Jean was a widow, previously married in 1938 to Patrick Ryan. Ryan had enlisted in the Army in November 1942, but was absent without leave soon afterwards and court martialled in Sydney in March 1943. He died on 7 May 1943 of "injuries accidentally received" as a result of an accident.

Hollebone had been released from Parramatta Gaol four months earlier than Hayes. After Chow Hayes' release he was engaged by Joe Taylor, one of three men running Thommos's two-up school, on wages of £100 a fortnight. Hayes and Hollebone began "running around" together and "drinking heavily". Hayes suggested to Taylor that Hollebone be put on the payroll and he was started on £60 a fortnight. The two men were engaged by Taylor for their toughness and intimidatory qualities, to assist in keeping order and deter rival criminals. In 1944 Thommos's two-up school was Sydney's largest, run by Taylor, Wally Goddard and Herman 'The Jew' Singer, and located in a terrace house in Reservoir Street, Surry Hills, a hundred yards from Elizabeth Street.

In November 1944 Hollebone was fined £20 for unlawful possession of coupons for rationed goods. Regulations for the rationing of clothing and certain food items (tea, sugar, butter and meat) had been introduced in May 1942 to manage shortages and control civilian consumption. Coupons were distributed to the population, which were then surrendered to retailers before rationed goods could be supplied.

In January 1945 Hollebone was charged with consorting with criminals, though he was not brought before court to face the charge; on this occasion he had his "license revoked" (possibly a barrowman's licence).

=== The Waterloo shootings ===
By early 1946 Hollebone was living in Shirlow Street, Marrickville. In the Central Criminal Court on 1 March 1946 William Hollebone was sentenced to four months' hard labour on a consorting charge. Detective Stuart James testified in court that during January and early February Hollebone, working as an unlicensed barrowman, had "habitually consorted with reputed criminals - thieves, car strippers and break-and-enter men". The detective claimed that seventy-five percent of unlicensed barrowmen were reputed criminals and he had witnessed "Hollebone selling from barrows". While Hollebone was serving his sentence, a Sydney criminal named Alfred ('Alfie') Dawes went to Hollebone's home and stole all his clothes. When Hazel Hollebone objected to the intrusion, Dawes struck her. On a prison visit Hazel reported the details to Hollebone, who told her not to mention it to anybody else.

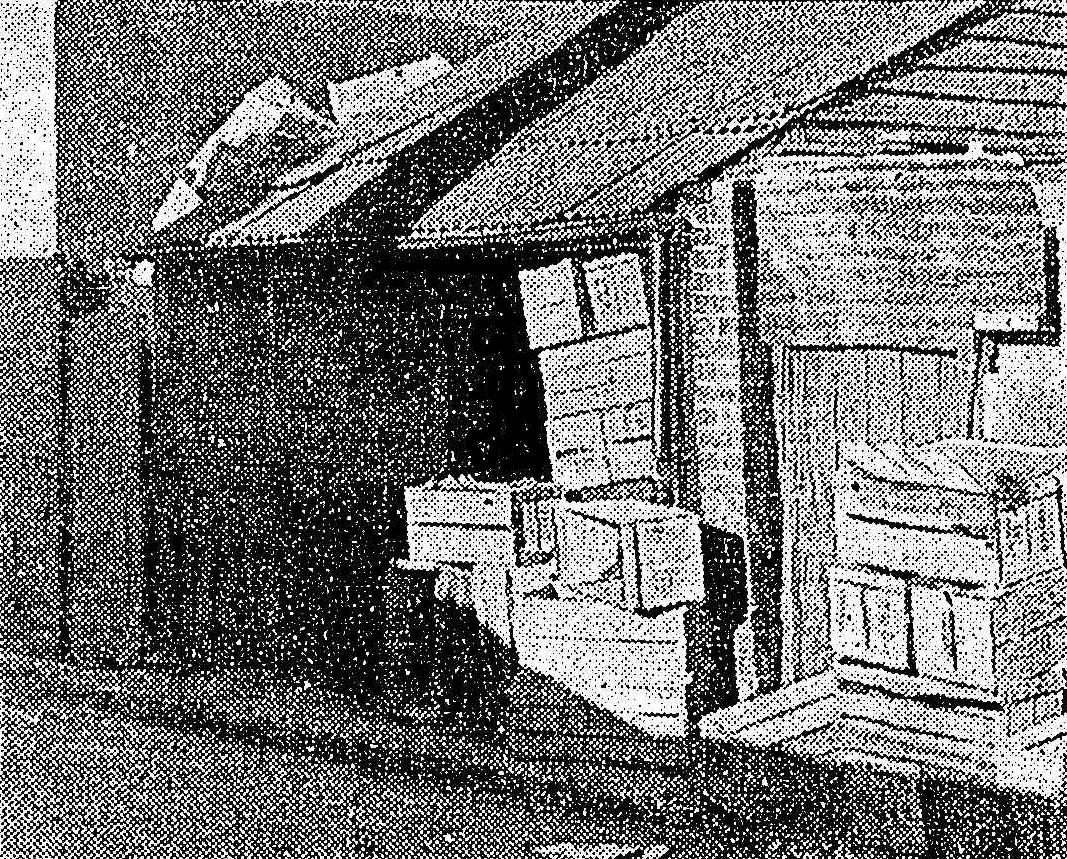
Alfred Dawes' wooden cottage in Mary Street, Waterloo.

In August 1946, soon after Hollebone was released, he received a six months' sentence for consorting with criminals, which was later reduced to a three-year bond on appeal. Later that month Hollebone took vengeance upon Dawes for the robbery of his clothes and assaulting his wife. At about 11 p.m. on 29 August 1946 Joey Hollebone entered Alfie Dawes' house in Waterloo, a two-roomed wooden cottage in Mary Street, where a drinking party was being held. As he entered the house, Hollebone fired six shots from a .32-calibre Smith and Wesson pistol, threw down the gun and immediately departed, leaving two of the occupants dead (including Dawes) and four wounded (one of whom later died). Detectives very promptly named the suspect as William Hollebone, and began searching for him that same night, raiding twenty suburban addresses without success. The shooting incident was reported as "an underworld feud between two well-known criminals dating back many years". The victims were:

- Marjorie Nurse (or Byrne), aged 19, from Paddington, who died at the scene;
- Alfred Dawes (jnr.), aged 26, a dealer and resident of the house; he was shot in the head and died about an hour later at Sydney Hospital without regaining consciousness;
- Douglas Graves, aged 27, of Waterloo; wounded by a bullet that entered his left temple; he was released from hospital on September 6, but died two days later;
- Noreen Miller, aged 22, a resident of the house and de facto spouse of Dawes (jnr.), shot in the left shoulder;
- Patrick ('Blue') McMahon, aged 30, of Paddington, wounded in the left forearm;
- Alfred Dawes (snr.), aged 55, a lorry driver, resident of the house and father of one of the dead men; shot through his right hand.

On the afternoon of the following day Hollebone, accompanied by his brother, walked into Central Police Station and surrendered himself, saying "he had heard that [the police] wanted to interview him". He was then taken to Redfern police station for questioning, and later charged with two murders and four counts of shooting with intent to murder. Hollebone briefly appeared in the Central Criminal Court on August 30 and was remanded in custody, before being escorted from the court "by a strong body of police".

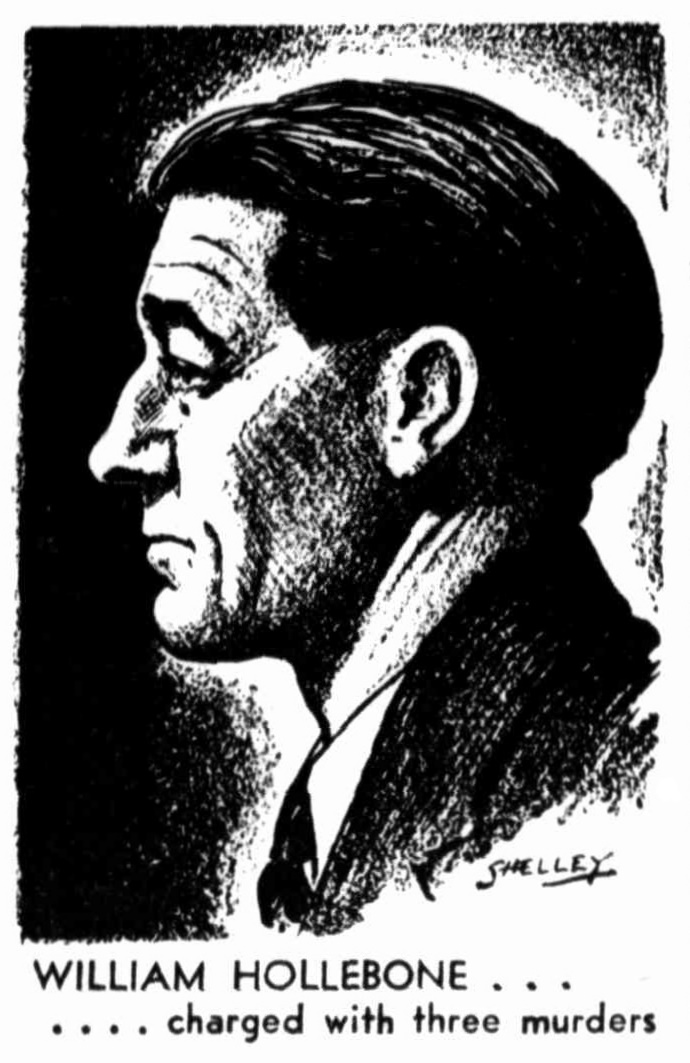
Illustration of William Hollebone during the Coroner's inquiry in October 1946 into the Mary Street shootings.

An inquest at the City Coroner's Court, beginning on 10 October, was held into the mass shooting at Waterloo, with the final hearing held on 1 November, during which time Hollebone continued to be remanded in custody. Most of the witnesses to the shootings refused to implicate or directly identify Hollebone as the killer, though a considerable amount of antagonism was directed to him. The only two witnesses willing to directly implicate Hollebone were Elizabeth ('Josie') Dawes, the mother of Alfie Dawes, and Noreen Miller. Josie Dawes also claimed she had been visited, on two separate occasions prior to the inquest, by men who told her to "do the right thing" when she testified. On the final day of the inquest the City Coroner committed Hollebone for trial on charges of having murdered three people at Waterloo on August 29.

In the period between the coronial inquiry and the murder trial, information was conveyed to Chow Hayes (and subsequently passed on to Hollebone's barrister), that proved to be decisive in conducting the case for the defence. After the shootings Josie Dawes had no sheets to cover the corpses, so the police borrowed some from a next-door neighbour. When the police returned the sheets to Mrs. Dawes and she washed and ironed them. However, instead of returning them to the neighbour, she took them to Grace's pawn shop in Abercrombie Street, Chippendale, and "pawned them for about 12 shillings".

Hollebone was tried for the murder of Alfred Dawes on December 12 and 13, with the barrister George Amsberg conducting Hollebone's defence. During Amsberg's cross-examination of Josie Dawes he introduced the subject of the sheets, with Mrs. Dawes claiming she had collected them from the police and returned them to the neighbour. Amsberg then encouraged her to declare she was sure of that – and she was just as certain that Hollebone was the man who murdered her son. At this point Amsberg revealed the details of what had actually happened to the sheets, exposing Mrs. Dawes' false testimony and adding "to the confusion between the witnesses about identifying Hollebone". At the conclusion of the trial Hollebone was acquitted by the jury after a retirement of only ten minutes. After the verdict the judge remarked to the jury: "I suppose you feel with me that it was extraordinary that, although there were eight or more people in this house... no responsible citizen considered it his duty to come forward, give evidence, or say who was responsible for it, and see that justice was done". In summing up the judge added, "Evidence against the accused makes it gravely suspicious that he was concerned in it, but that does not make it beyond any reasonable doubt". Immediately after his acquittal Hollebone was charged with the murders of Marjorie Nurse and Douglas Graves. However, the additional murder charges were eventually dropped, with the Attorney-General entering a nolle prosequi (a formal notice of abandonment by a prosecutor of the charges). A further charge of having used an unlicensed pistol was also dismissed and Hollebone was discharged from custody on 17 January 1947.

=== Home invasion ===
In August 1948 Hollebone and Hayes, along with two others (Herbert 'The Wrecker' Warner and William 'The Kid' O'Connell), were charged with having assaulted and robbed Philip and Adelaide Great at their home in Raper Street, Surry Hills. The incident occurred when six men – the four arrested and two others, Leslie Dugdale and James Singleton – went to Great's house on the evening of August 19. The men had previously met up at Warner's house in Surry Hills for a drinking session, but Warner confided that he was "having a blue with the missus" and suggested they walk down the road to the nearby house of Philip and Adelaide Great. After consuming beer and refusing to leave, Great and his wife were menaced with an air pistol (carried by Warner) and had neckties tied around their throats. The men threatened to choke them and shoot their son "if they 'squealed copper'". The Greats eventually fled from their home, during which the house was ransacked and jewellery, other goods and £108 in cash were stolen. It was later alleged that the men had been "molesting and threatening the family for some time". The incident was reported to police and Hollebone, Hayes, Warner and O'Connell were located and arrested. They were charged and faced court at a bail hearing on August 20, where they were remanded in custody, the police prosecutor claiming "the police feared for the safety of two witnesses". A committal hearing was held at the Central Court on September 7, by which time Dugdale had also been detained. The five men were committed for trial and bail refused. It was noted in press reports that the "well-known Sydney identity", Kate Leigh, was in attendance in the public gallery of the court. When the hearing adjourned for lunch Leigh walked over to the five men in the dock and advised them to "go to the cells and have a good feed". At the close of the day's proceedings, as the men were being returned to the cells, Leigh called out to them, "Cheer up, chappies".

On trial of the five men for the robbery from the home of Philip Great was held in the Darlinghurst Quarter Sessions on 5 November 1948. The Crown prosecutor described the theft as "a typical example of the callous brutality of the stand-over gangster". The men were found guilty and received the following sentences of imprisonment: Hayes (five years); Dugdale (three years); Hollebone (three years); Warner (two years). The fifth man, O'Connell, was placed on a three-year good behaviour bond. Hollebone and Hayes both appealed against their convictions on the grounds "that there was no evidence of common purpose to support the Crown case and that the verdict of the jury was against the weight of evidence". On December 17 the Criminal Court of Appeal upheld their appeals, set aside the convictions and directed a verdict of acquittal for each man. Although "it was apparent that several intruders grossly misconducted themselves in the house", the Chief Justice, in announcing the decision, said "there was no satisfactory evidence that Hollebone and Hayes were present when the stealing took place, or that they took part in the stealing", adding: "In those circumstances, although, I must confess, with some regret, I am forced to the conclusion that the convictions should not be allowed to stand". After the appeal Hollebone was released, but Hayes had to serve a two-year sentence in Maitland Gaol for the related assault conviction (for which he had previously pleaded guilty after being assured it would be served concurrent to his five-year robbery sentence).

In February 1949 Hollebone was working as a labourer in Sydney's dockyards. On February 21 he was fined £100 in the Special Federal Court for unlawful possession of 140 three-strand imitation pearl necklaces. Earlier in the day Hollebone had been found with the necklaces wound around his waist and in his socks when he was stopped and searched at a wharf where the Westralia was berthed. It was stated by police that Hollebone had "one of the worst criminal records in this State", who had been "charged with everything from murder downwards".

=== Partnership with Hayes ===
During the late 1940s and early 1950s Chow Hayes and Joey Hollebone "were the two best known and most feared gunmen in Sydney", with the newspapers reporting their activities "with a constant fascination". Joey Hollebone was described by Chow Hayes as "a silent bloke" whose company he enjoyed. The two men often engaged in drinking bouts together, with Hollebone having a preference for wine rather than beer ("not good wine, real cheap wine"). In contrast to Hollebone's "quiet, unemotional company", Hayes found Hazel Hollebone to be "a pain in the neck", often "trying to grab some attention and cause a bit of a fight".

Hayes described one occasion when he witnessed Hollebone violently attacking his wife. Joey and Hazel Hollebone had been drinking wine all night and arguing. Hayes arrived at their house on the following morning, with the couple still arguing heatedly to the point where Hazel told Hollebone "he could get out". Suddenly Hollebone "smashed a glass and jabbed her in the face", the broken glass cutting "a huge half-moon across Hazel's cheek". She fell to the kitchen floor, screaming, and Hollebone said to Hayes "forget about her". Hayes said he couldn't just leave her, so Hollebone told him to look after her. With towels pressed to Hazel's face Hayes flagged down a passing car and took her to St Vincent's Hospital, where the wound was given 40 stitches. Hayes left after delivering her to the hospital. The police later interviewed Hollebone, but Hazel maintained she had fallen and their enquiries went no further. In recollecting the incident Hayes claimed it was "the only time I saw Hollebone fly off so suddenly".

=== Firearms charge ===
On or about 23 April 1950 a group of men smashed down the door of Hollebone's home with an axe while looking for him. The men caught up with him at the Sunbeam Hotel in Riley-street, Surry Hills, where he was "battered and bashed". About a week later, in the early hours of April 30, two detectives of the Consorting Squad were driving along Riley Street, Surry Hills, when they recognised three pedestrians as Joey and Hazel Hollebone and Bessie Woods. As they stopped the car, Hollebone was seen to pull a gun from his pocket and throw it over a fence. The three were put in the police car and driven to where the detectives could access the vacant allotment on the opposite side of the fence, where they found a fully loaded .38-calibre Beretta automatic pistol. When questioned, the gunman said he was "carrying the weapon for protection". Bearing signs of injuries in the form of two black eyes and a swollen nose, Hollebone told detectives "he had been bashed by 10 men a week before". Hollebone and the two women were charged with carrying an unlicensed pistol. At their bail hearing on May 1 police did not oppose bail for the two women, but asked that bail be refused for Hollebone, fearing if he were "permitted to go at liberty further violence may ensue". However, despite police opposition, bail of £300 was allowed for Hollebone. Hollebone pleaded guilty to the charge of "carrying a loaded unlicensed pistol at night". On 1 June 1950, in the Sydney Central Court, he was sentenced to 12 months' imprisonment

While Hollebone was serving his sentence in early 1951, Hazel Hollebone was living in Albion Street, Surry Hills.

=== The murder of Bobby Lee ===
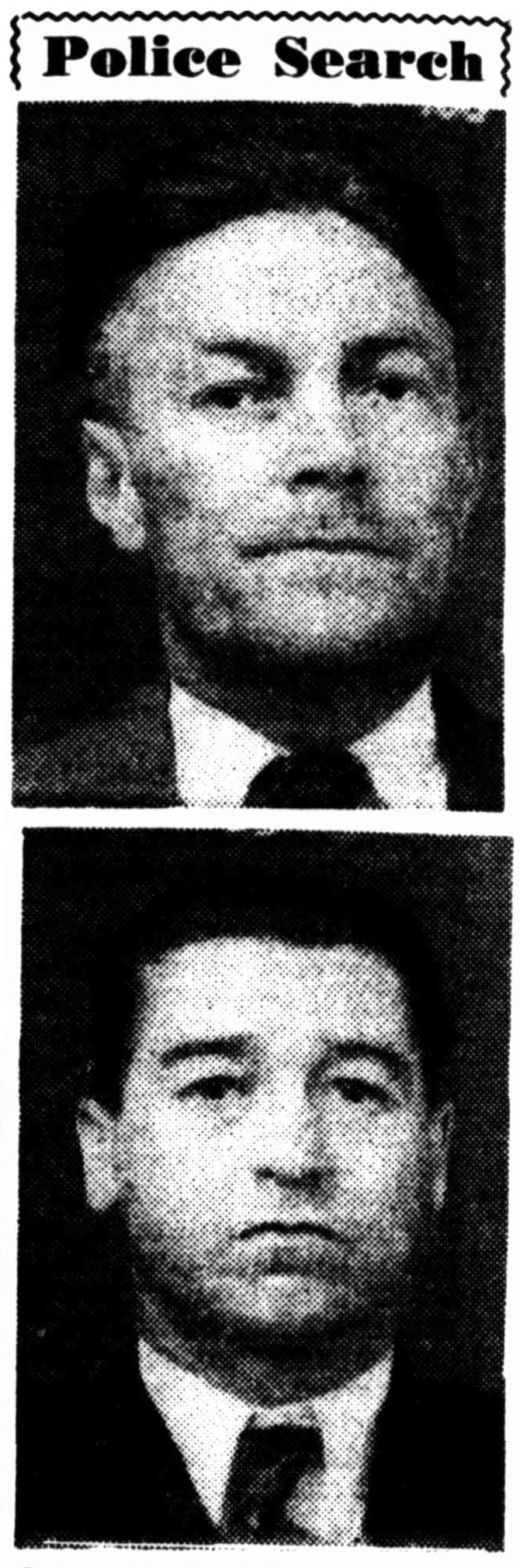
Newspaper photographs of Hayes (top) and Hollebone, published during the police manhunt following the murder of 'Bobby' Lee on 29 May 1951.

On the night of 1 May 1951 Chow Hayes' nephew, Dennis 'Danny Boy' Simmons, was shot and killed at Hayes' house in Ultimo. He was shot twice in the back of his head through the lounge-room window by William 'Bobby' Lee, who believed he was shooting at Hayes. Lee, an ex-boxer and one of the bouncers at Thommo's two-up school, had been involved in a violent personal dispute with Hayes. The murder set off a series of events that culminated in Hayes serving a lengthy prison sentence. Hollebone was still in prison on the firearms charge when Simmons was murdered, but was released soon afterwards. By that time Hayes was certain that it was Lee who had shot his nephew.

On the evening of May 28, about a fortnight after his release from prison, Joey and Hazel Hollebone joined Chow Hayes and his wife 'Topsy' for a night out at the Ziegfeld Cabaret in King Street, Sydney. Hayes had received information that Bobby Lee would be at the club. Later in the night, in the early hours of Tuesday May 29, Hayes and Hollebone approached Lee's table and sat down. After an exchange of angry words, by which time it became apparent Lee had no intention of going 'outside', Hayes pulled a .45-calibre pistol from his belt and shot him five times. Hayes hastily departed, leaving Hollebone to gather up Hazel and Topsy and they also quickly left the club. Topsy Hayes and Hazel Hollebone were later charged with Lee's murder (but granted bail), while Hayes and Hollebone remained in hiding from the police for a period of six weeks. The police apprehended Hollebone on July 10, found hiding under a double bed in an upstairs room at Henry 'Bronze' Monzetti's 'Hasty Tasty' fish shop in Cleveland Street, Darlington. He was taken to Central Police Station and charged with Lee's murder. Hollebone was remanded without bail and Monzetti was charged with harbouring and granted bail. Hayes was apprehended on July 13 in a pre-dawn police operation at his home in Ultimo, where he had been hiding for much of the time since Lee's murder.

An inquiry into Bobby Lee's murder commenced on 16 August 1951 in the City Coroner's Court. During the inquest the Coroner said "there was no evidence which could possibly connect the Hollebones with the crime". He convened a Court of Petty Sessions and formally discharged William and Hazel Hollebone, but ordered that they attend the inquiry as witnesses. After several adjournments the Coroner committed Hayes and his wife to stand trial on November 19 for Lee's murder. Topsy Hayes was allowed bail, but for her husband it was refused. On October 9 Hollebone and Reginald Smith, a well-known criminal and one of the witnesses to the Lee murder inquiry, had a drink at a hotel in Riley Street. Hollebone was being trailed by the police and was subsequently charged with habitually consorting with criminals.

Chow Hayes was tried in November 1951, but the prosecution case was hampered by a lack of witnesses to the shooting willing to testify. Hollebone was called as a defence witness. He claimed he saw Lee knock down a stranger in the toilet and a few minutes later the man came to their table and shot Lee. During the cross-examination Hollebone was asked: "You know a bit about guns, Mr. Hollebone?", to which he replied "No" and claimed he had never fired a pistol in his life. This prompted the prosecutor to ask questions about the witness' knowledge of firearms, remarking that he had been previously convicted of carrying a gun. Hollebone, according to Hayes' later description, "kept going on with really silly answers, making out he wasn't familiar with guns, instead of just admitting straight out that he was familiar with them". After a six-hour retirement the jury announced it could not agree on a verdict. On 14 December 1951 Hollebone was sentenced to two months' jail for the consorting offence, for which he had been charged two months earlier.

Hayes faced a second trial for Lee's murder in March 1952 and again the jury failed to agree. He was remanded in custody to await a third trial. At his third trial in May 1952 Hayes was found guilty of Lee's murder and sentenced to death (later commuted to life imprisonment). In June 1952, in a separate trial, Topsy Hayes was acquitted of the murder charge.

=== Further firearm offences ===
On 4 November 1952 police arrived at a house in Shepherd Street, Darlington, and found Hollebone and a bookmaker named Charles Webber, each in possession of loaded .32-calibre revolvers. Webber had a large cut over his left eye and a blood-stained shirt. Both were charged with possession of the firearms and granted bail. The charges were postponed in the courts on a number of occasions, with both men allowed bail. On September 8 Hollebone pleaded guilty to the charge and he and Webber were each fined £50.

On 22 October 1953 Hollebone was arrested at Surry Hills after two police detectives saw him alight from a taxi and then jump back in. Upon searching the taxi they found a loaded pistol jammed under the cushion of the front seat. When asked about it, Hollebone said: "It could have been for protection". He was charged with having an unlicensed pistol in his possession. Hollebone was sentenced to a prison term of one year for the offence, but indicated he would be appealing against the sentence. On 16 December 1953, on the day he was to appear in court to appeal the unlicensed firearm sentence, Hollebone walked into the Royal Prince Alfred Hospital in Camperdown with a bullet wound in his chest, claiming he had accidentally shot himself while cleaning a rifle. After the shooting Hollebone's solicitor successfully applied for the postponement of Hollebone's appeal hearing. Chow Hayes gave a different version of these events. He claimed that Hollebone shot himself in his inside thigh in Missenden Road before walking to the hospital and saying he had "been shot by an unknown man".

Hollebone's appeal on the unlicensed firearm charge was listed for 2 March 1954. His solicitor secured a postponement for a week pending the production of a medical certificate, claiming Hollebone's wife "was in hospital dying of tuberculosis". On March 9, after reviewing the medical evidence, the judge directed that the appeal trial would proceed. After a brief hearing Hollebone's sentence was increased to a jail-term of two and a half years for the October 22 unlicensed pistol charge. During the appeal hearing Detective Baker told Judge Curlewis that Hollebone "not known to follow any lawful occupation", adding that "he was addicted to drink and was an associate of the most active and worst types of criminals in the State".

In 1956, during his incarceration in Long Bay Gaol, Hollebone was badly beaten by another violent criminal named Dowden (probably Ronald Dowden). Hollebone had initiated the fight by knocking Dowden down with an iron tub; however, Dowden regained his feet "and proceeded to give Hollebone a good hiding".

=== Death ===
William 'Joey' Hollebone died in St. Vincent's Hospital, Darlinghurst, on 28 September 1960, aged 43 years, his death caused by a cerebral haemorrhage.

Hazel Hollebone died on 20 January 1968, aged 47 years, and was buried at Lismore, in north-east New South Wales.
