= John "Chow" Hayes =

Australian gangster (1911–1993)

John Frederick Hayes
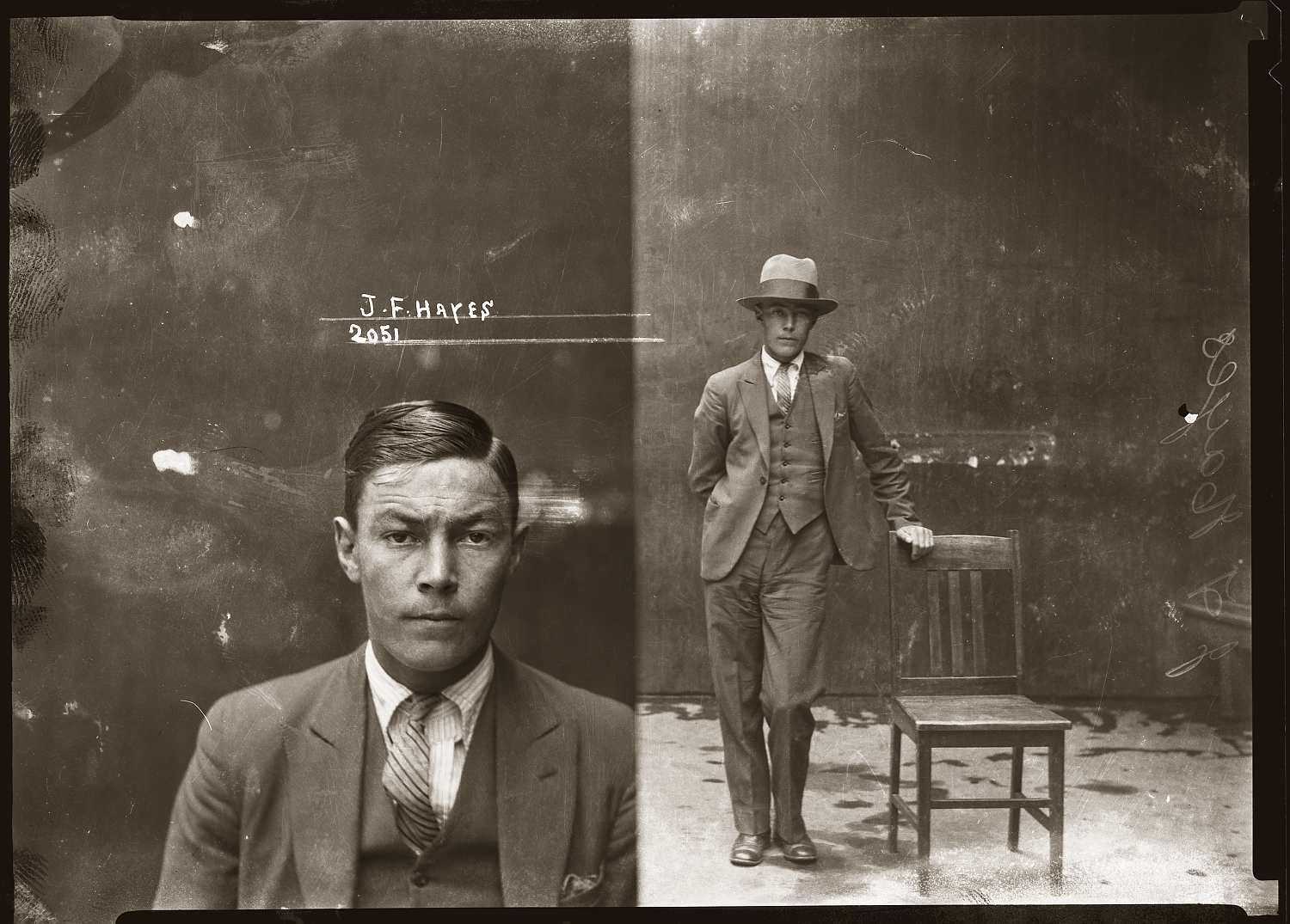
- Born: 7 September 1911; Paddington, New South Wales, Australia
- Died: 7 May 1993 (aged 81); Lidcombe, New South Wales, Australia
- Other name: Chow Hayes
- Occupation: Stand-over criminal
- Spouse: Gladys Muriel King
- Children: 3 sons, 1 daughter
- Convictions: Murder, theft, gun crime
- Criminal charges: Murder, gun possession, theft, violent offence
- Penalty: Death, commuted to life imprisonment

John Frederick "Chow" Hayes (7 September 1911 – 7 May 1993) was an Australian criminal who became known as Australia's first gangster.

== Early life ==
Hayes was born in the Sydney suburb of Paddington on 7 September 1911, the illegitimate son of Elizabeth Hayes who was a prostitute and petty criminal, although Hayes lied about much of his early background in his biography. He was soon put into the care of his grandmother and an aunt and was brought up by them. He lived his early years in the inner-city suburbs of Chippendale and Haymarket.

Hayes rarely attended school after his eighth birthday, and earned a living as a newspaper seller in the area around Railway Square. He was caught for truancy on a number of occasions and was sent to boy reformatories. As a teenager he became involved with gang-related crime in and around his local area, namely shoplifting, petty theft and assault.

Hayes was known as a major player in the Sydney Gang Wars of the late 1920s and 1930s and was known to police as an extremely violent person. In February 1939, Chow Hayes was shot at Glebe and taken to Royal Prince Alfred Hospital. In a show of bravado, he discharged himself with the bullet still inside his body to avoid police interrogation.

Incidents like this were reported widely in the national media, and Chow Hayes's hard reputation grew.

== Adult life ==
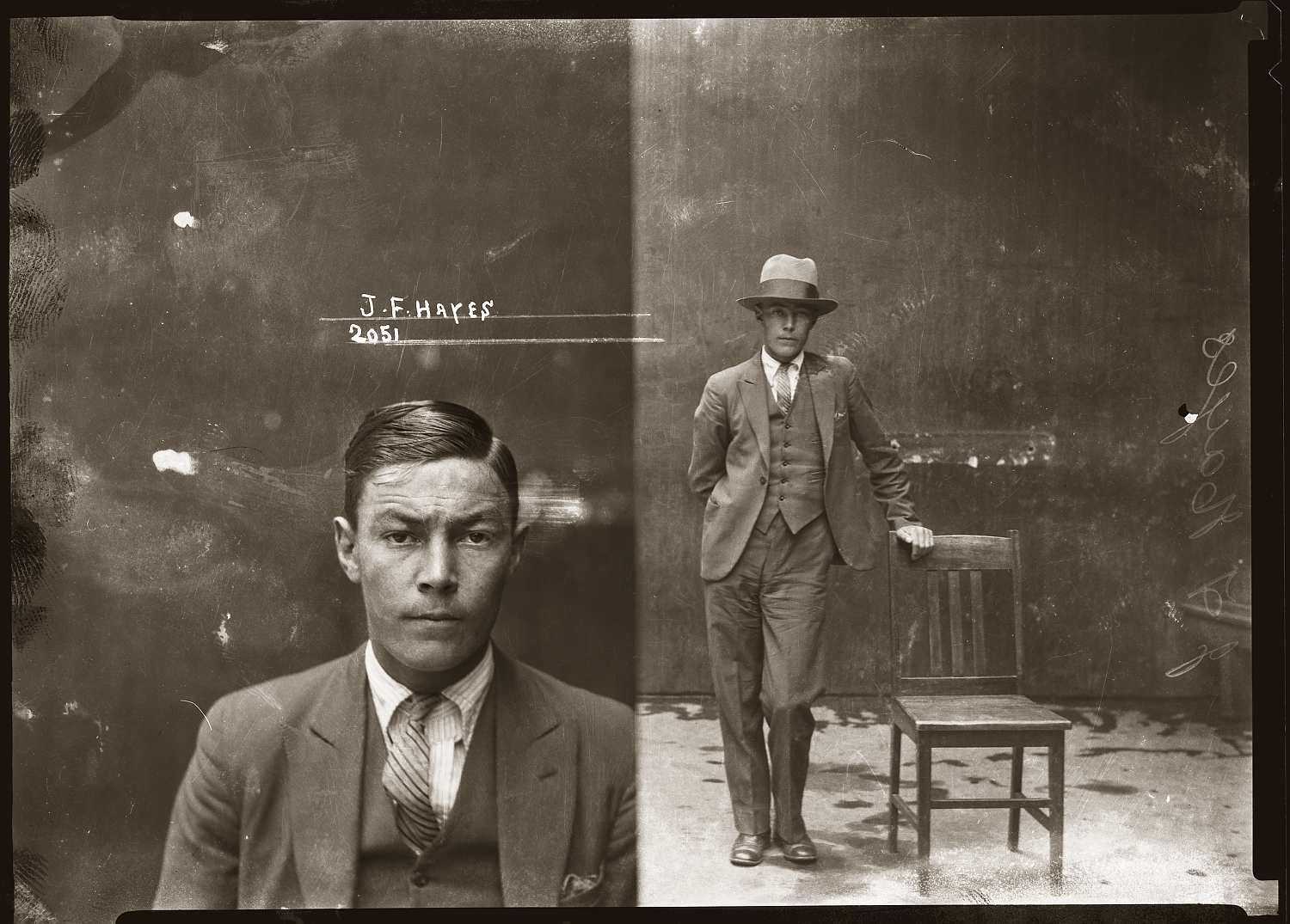
John "Chow" Hayes" mugshots, Central Police Station, Sydney, 6 November 1930,

Hayes' criminal career progressed as he grew older. A 1990 biography by David Hickie named "Chow Hayes, Gunman", suggested that he started carrying and using firearms in his late teens. He became involved in larger robberies and stand-over extortion scams, which enriched his ego, but also gave him a very bad reputation with the general public and thus became a menace to the police.

In 1929, Chow was aligned with Kate Leigh against Tilly Devine in the Razor Wars, where he took part in a Razor fight at Kings Cross which involved approximately 50 of Australia's Sydney Gangsters.

Chow Hayes spent many years of his life in prison for a succession of crimes, which included small felonies such as drunkenness and capital crimes such as murder. In 1938, he shot Henry Jack Baker, the de facto partner of Sydney crime czar Kate Leigh outside Leigh's home at Lansdowne Street Surry Hills, but he escaped prosecution.

In the mid-1940s, Chow Hayes committed many crimes with his friend William 'Joey' Hollebone.

On New Year's Day 1945, he shot and killed a fellow Sydney gangster named Eddie Weyman (1915-1945). He was later found not guilty at trial. In the 1990 David Hickie biography, Hayes admitted that he had killed Weyman and got away with it.

In 1951, he murdered a fellow gangster William 'Bobby' Lee (1915-1951) at a Sydney inner city nightclub in retribution, after Lee had shot and killed Hayes's nephew Dennis James (Danny) Simmons in a case of mistaken identity. After hiding from police for six weeks, he and his accomplice William 'Joey' Hollebone were caught by the notorious Sydney detective Ray 'Gunner' Kelly. He was tried twice for this offence before he was found guilty at his third trial in 1952. Hayes served over fifteen years in prison for the murder of Lee.

In the mid-1960s, he was freed from prison under licence, and was soon back extorting money from many of Sydney's most dangerous criminals, including crooked casino boss Dick Reilly and the 'king' of Sydney's brothel business Joe Borg. In May 1968, Hayes was initially implicated in Borg's murder, although the police quickly determined that he was not involved.

Hayes was back in jail for another seven years in 1970 for a grievous bodily harm conviction when he sliced the face and arms of Gerald John Hutchinson with a broken glass in 1969.

== Family life ==
Chow Hayes was married on 23 December 1932 to his childhood sweetheart, Gladys Muriel King (1913-1969), known as 'Topsy'. They had four children, three sons and a daughter.

== Last years and death ==
After spending over 30 years in prison at different times, Chow Hayes was released on 14 February 1977. All of his ill-gotten wealth was long gone, either wasted on gambling or on expensive legal costs. He lived out the rest of his life with no criminal convictions, and lived in a flat at Lidcombe.

Two years before his death, prominent cartoonist and portraitist Bill Leak painted Hayes' portrait. His work entitled 'The murderer Chow Hayes' was a finalist in the Archibald Prize at the Art Gallery of New South Wales 1991/2. (https://www.artgallery.nsw.gov.au/prizes/archibald/1991-92/17017/)

After a long battle with cancer, Hayes died in Sydney on 7 May 1993. His cremated ashes were placed in his wife's grave on 31 January 1994 at Rookwood Cemetery. He was survived by his daughter.
