= Tilly Devine =

English-Australian criminal (1900–1970)

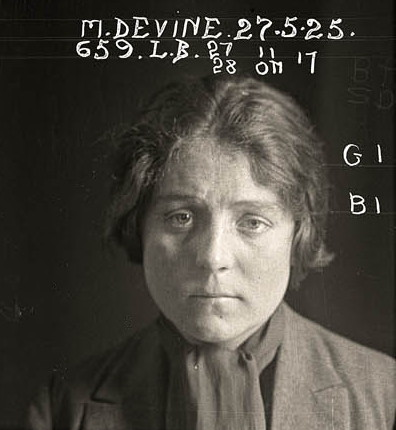
- Tilly Devine in 1925
- Born: Matilda Mary Twiss; 8 September 1900; Camberwell, London, England
- Died: 24 November 1970 (aged 70); Concord Repatriation Hospital, Sydney, New South Wales, Australia
- Burial place: Eastern Suburbs Memorial Park
- Other name: Queen of Woolloomooloo
- Occupation: Crime boss
- Years active: c. 1920s – 1950s
- Known for: Famous Sydney folk figure of the interwar period
- Notable work: Involvement in Razor gangs, madam, sly-grog supply
- Spouse(s): James Edward Joseph "Jim" Devine (m. 1917; div. 1944); Eric John Parsons (m. 1945; d. 1958)
- Children: Alice Teresa Devine
- Parent(s): Edward Twiss; Alice Twiss (née Tubb)

Matilda Mary Devine (née Twiss, 8 September 1900 – 24 November 1970), also known as Tilly Devine, was an English Australian organised crime boss. She was involved in a wide range of activities, including sly-grog, razor gangs, and prostitution, and became a famous folk figure in Sydney during the interwar years.

== Early life ==
Matilda Twiss was born to a bricklayer Edward Twiss and his wife Alice Twiss (née Tubb) at 57 Hollington Street, Camberwell, London in the United Kingdom. Her career in prostitution began when she was a teenager and continued after she was married. Tilly and many English women were usually found soliciting at night on the wide footpaths on The Strand. Between 1915 and 1919, Tilly spent time at Bow Street Court and Lock Up for prostitution, theft and assault.

Tilly married an Australian serviceman, James (Jim) Edward Joseph Devine, (born Brunswick, Victoria, 1892, died Heidelberg, Victoria, 18 August 1966), on 12 April 1917 at the Church of the Sacred Heart of Jesus, Camberwell, London. Tilly claimed to be twenty-one years of age at the time of the marriage, though she was actually only sixteen. The couple had a daughter, Alice Teresa Devine, who was born prematurely at 57 Hollington Street on 8 March 1918. Alice died the following day in the presence of her maternal grandmother and namesake Alice Twiss.

When Jim returned to Australia, Tilly followed him back on the bride ship Waimana, arriving in Sydney on 13 January 1920. The couple supposedly also had a son who stayed in London and was brought up by her parents. Both Tilly and Jim Devine rapidly became prominent illegal narcotics dealers, brothel owners and crime gangs members in the Sydney criminal milieu.

== Criminal career ==
Tilly Devine, known as the ‘Queen of Woolloomooloo’ ran a string of brothels centred around Darlinghurst and the Cross, and in particular, Palmer Street. Kate Leigh, known as the ‘Queen of Surry Hills’, was a sly grogger and fence for stolen property.

By 1925 Tilly was well known to police. In five years she had accumulated a long list of convictions; the numerous offences ranged from common prostitution to indecent language, offensive behaviour and assault. The police report is a snapshot of the life that Tilly was leading up to 1925, a life that involved working the streets at night, clashes with Police and lots of parties and heavy drinking.

Devine became infamous in Sydney, initially as a prostitute, then later as a brothel madam and organised crime entrepreneur. The NSW Vagrancy Act 1905 prohibited men from running brothels; it did nothing to stop women with criminal gangs' support and bribes to the police from running criminal enterprises. Historian Larry Writer has noted that the Devines ran diversified operations. Elite "call girls" were available for politicians, businessmen and overseas guests of significance, while "tenement girls" were young working-class women who resorted to casual prostitution to supplement their drug spending, clothing and meagre earnings during times of Australian criminal and narcotic culture, absence of a comprehensive welfare state and unemployment. Older female prostitutes, "boat girls", catered to itinerant sailors or working-class men. Devine does not seem to have run similar operations for the gay sex market during this time because she believed gays went to hell.

Devine's wealth was legendary, although it was all earned from crime. She owned much real estate in Sydney, many luxury cars, looted gold and diamond jewellery and travelled by ship in first class staterooms. Much of her wealth was also used to pay bribes to the police sectors, and fines for her criminal convictions that spanned fifty years. Devine faced numerous court summons and was convicted on 204 occasions during her long criminal career, and served many gaol sentences in New South Wales gaols, mainly for prostitution, violent assault, affray and attempted murder. She was known to the police to be of a violent nature and was known to use firearms.

== Marriage to Jim Devine ==
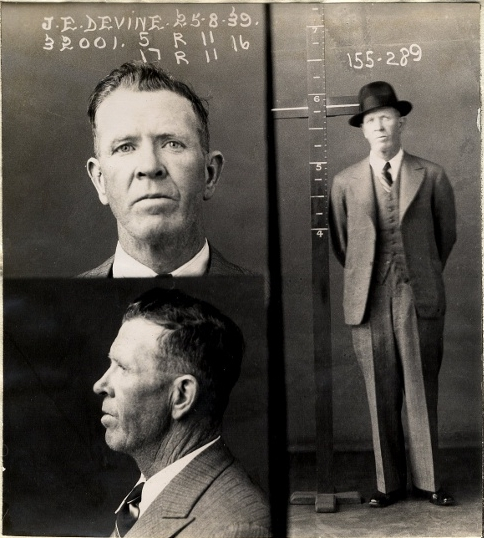
Jim Devine in 1939

James Edward Joseph (Jim) Devine was an WWI ex-serviceman and shearer, who was a violent 'stand-over' man, a convicted thief, a pimp, drug dealer, vicious thug and gunman. He was also an alcoholic. Devine committed a number of high-profile murders in Sydney between 1929 and 1931: notably, the murder of criminal George Leonard "Gregory" Gaffney on 17 July 1929, secondly, as an accessory to the murder of Barney Dalton on 9 November 1929 (with infamous Sydney gangster and assassin, Francis Donald "Frankie" Green) and, thirdly, the accidental shooting of taxi driver, Frederick Herbert Moffitt on 16 June 1931. Although he was charged with murder on more than one occasion, he was always acquitted, successfully arguing self defence. He shot and killed Gaffney and Moffitt outside his and Tilly's Maroubra residence.

Tilly and Jim Devine's marriage was marred by domestic violence. On 9 January 1931, Jim was charged at Central Police Court with the attempted murder of his wife after a heated argument at their Maroubra home. As Tilly ran out of the house, Jim fired a number of shots at her in a similar way to the murder of George Leonard Gaffney in 1929. Tilly escaped unscathed, the only damage being one of her brand new stilettos – the left one. Their terrified neighbours called the police resulting in Jim being arrested and charged over the incident. He was later acquitted, on 16 January 1931, because Tilly refused to testify. The Devines separated in the early 1940s and were finally divorced in January 1944. Shortly after Tilly separated from Jim, long time criminal associate, Donald Alexander Kenney (1906–1963), known as 'Skinny Kenney', became Tilly's lover and stand-over man.

== Second marriage ==
Devine married for the second time on 19 May 1945 to ex-seaman and returned serviceman Eric John Parsons (born Melbourne 1901, died Sydney 1958).

Tilly famously shot Parsons in the leg after an argument only months before they were married. This shooting occurred at her other Sydney residence: 191 Palmer Street, Darlinghurst. The house was almost opposite the notorious Tradesman's Arms Hotel. It was at this hotel that Devine met Eric Parsons. She was arrested by police and charged with the shooting, but was acquitted at trial on 31 March 1945. They were happily married for 13 years until Eric Parsons died of cancer on 22 November 1958.

For over 30 years, Devine lived at 335 Malabar Road, Maroubra in Sydney's Eastern Suburbs. A number of homicides were committed at this residence. The property remained derelict from the 1950s onwards. It was sold in 2009 and the new owner built a new house on the lot.

== Decline and death ==
Although Devine had been one of Sydney's wealthiest women, by 1955 the Taxation Department ordered her to pay more than £20,000 in unpaid income tax and fines sending her close to bankruptcy. In 1953 Devine boasted to the media, "I am a lucky, lucky girl. I have more diamonds than the Queen of England's stowaways – and better ones too!" She sold off her last brothel in Palmer Street, Darlinghurst in 1968, and died two years later.

Devine was famous for flamboyant acts of generosity, and also for her violent feud with criminal vice rival Kate Leigh. Devine was charged by the famous Sydney Detective Frank Farrell on many occasions, and their feud lasted for 30 years.

Devine had suffered from chronic bronchitis for 20 years, and died of cancer, aged 70 at the Concord Repatriation Hospital in Sydney on 24 November 1970. Her funeral service was held at the Sacred Heart Catholic Church, Darlinghurst. She was cremated at Botany Crematorium, now known as Eastern Suburbs Memorial Park, on 26 November 1970 with Catholic rites by her married name, Matilda Mary Parsons. She was survived by her son Frederick Ralph (Devine) Twiss (1919–1978) and 2 grandchildren. Her funeral service was poorly attended and her death went virtually unnoticed by Sydney's media and population and it was said that very few people openly mourned her death. The only public eulogy offered to Devine was given by the then police commissioner Norman Allan who said: "She was a villain, but who am I to judge her?"

== In popular culture ==
Peter Kenna wrote a play called The Slaughter of St Teresa’s Day (1973 Currency Press), where the lead character was based on Devine.

The song "Miss Divine" from the 1990 Icehouse album Code Blue is about Devine.

A popular cafe-nightclub in Lyneham, Canberra is called Tilleys Devine Cafe Gallery. A wine bar in Darlinghurst, Sydney opened in 2011, named "Love Tilly Devine" in honour of Devine.

In August 2011, Australia's Channel Nine commenced screening Underbelly: Razor, a true crime television drama series that deals with the Leigh/Devine Sydney gangland wars in the 1930s. The series was based on the Ned Kelly Award-winning book by Larry Writer. Devine was portrayed by Chelsie Preston Crayford, who was nominated for a Logie Award for Most Popular New Female Talent.

Devine is a background character in Kerry Greenwood's Death Before Wicket, the tenth Phryne Fisher novel, which is set in Sydney in 1928.

Tilly Devine is referenced in Ronni Salt’s 2024 debut novel Gunnawah - a fictional Murray river town and the setting for a 1974 crime story.

Tilly Devine is heavily featured in the 2026 novel "The Diamonds of Tilly Devine" by Jackie French.

== See also ==
- Kate Leigh, Devine's bitter rival
