= Razor gang =

Criminal gangs from 1920's Sydney

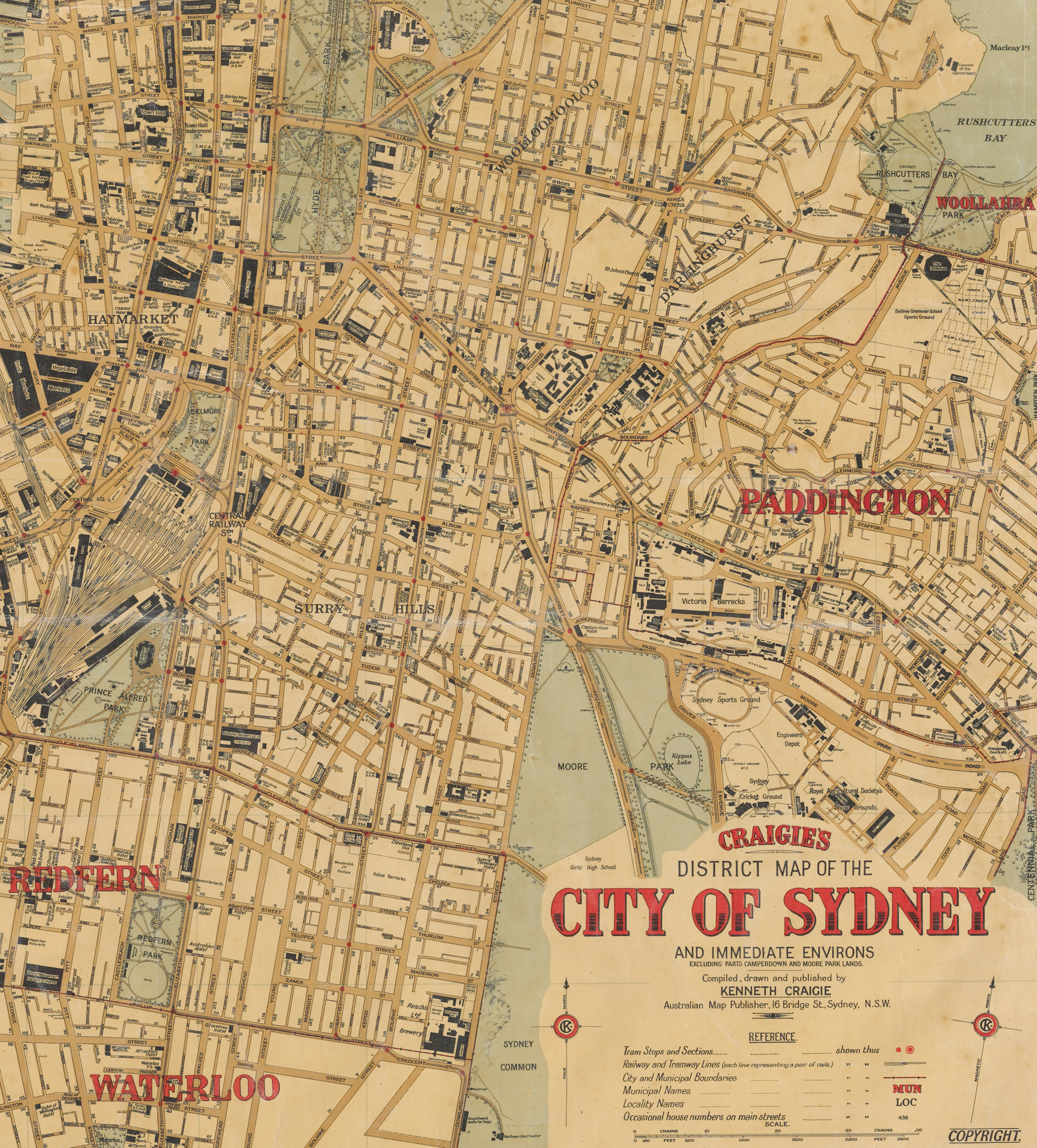
Razor gang areas of Sydney, 1927

Razor gangs were criminal gangs who dominated the Sydney crime scene in the 1920s. After the passage of the Pistol Licensing Act 1927, the Parliament of New South Wales imposed severe penalties for carrying concealed firearms and handguns. In response, Sydney gangland figures began to use razors as their preferred weapons (particularly due to their capacity to inflict disfiguring scars).

== Background ==
The upsurge in organised crime began after the prohibition of sale of cocaine by chemists (under the Dangerous Drugs (Amendment) Act 1927), the prohibition of street prostitution (under the Vagrancy Act 1905), the criminalisation of off-course race track betting (under the Betting and Gaming Act 1906) and the introduction of six o'clock closing for public bars (under the passage of the Licensing Act 1916.

Illegal drug distribution became a serious social problem due to the concentration of addicts in Kings Cross, Darlinghurst and Woolloomooloo, estimated at five thousand. Marijuana, opium, morphine, heroin, paraldehyde and cocaine were all heavily consumed. Cocaine was particularly remunerative for criminal entrepreneurs like Kate Leigh and others, due to its ephemeral "highs" and the need for recurrent supplies to users. As in Paris, Barcelona, Madrid, Brussels and Rome, Sydney sex workers were a sizeable market for the cocaine trade, which was supplied from corrupt chemists, doctors, dentists and sailors (given that Peru, Bolivia and Colombia were all accessible through transpacific merchant shipping routes).

== Razors as preferred criminal weapon: 1927–1930 ==
After handguns were criminalised in New South Wales, razors became the weapon of choice amongst Sydney gangsters. Shortly after the Pistol Licensing Act 1927 was passed, a visiting sailor used a cut-throat razor to defend himself from attackers. As a result, razors became a default weapon due to its ease of purchase from barbers shops for a few pence, its ease of concealment (hidden inside a piece of cork), and its use as an instrument of intimidation and threatened or actual mutilation, physical impairment or murder against one's adversaries, prey or hostile spouses. It has been estimated that there were over five hundred slashings within Sydney during the heyday of intensive razor gang criminal activity. Macquarie Street's Sydney Hospital and St Vincent's Hospital, Sydney in Darlinghurst treated many of these casualties of gangland hostilities.

Tilly Devine, known as the "Queen of Woolloomooloo" and connected to the gangs, ran a string of brothels centred around Darlinghurst and the Cross, and in particular, Palmer Street. Leigh, known as the "Queen of Surry Hills", was a sly groger and fence for stolen property.

Members of the New South Wales Police and several New South Wales politicians also had connections to the gangs. The two major razor gangs were associated with prominent madams Leigh and Devine. These two gangs began open warfare in 1929, culminating in two riots. One was known as the "Battle of Blood Alley" and was waged in Eaton Avenue, King's Cross. It occurred because drug distributors discovered that Phil Jeffs (1896–1945), another gang lord, was adulterating his cocaine supply with boracic acid. It occurred on 7 May 1929. Later that year, on 8 August, the "Battle of Kellett Street" was waged between rival gangs affiliated with Leigh and Devine, and occurred in Kellett Street, near King's Cross. Considerable amounts of bootleg alcohol and cocaine were consumed beforehand, leading to thrown bottles, physical assaults, firearm exchanges and razor attacks.

The gang violence was curtailed in the 1930s by the Vagrancy Amendment Act NSW 1929. It contained "criminal consorting" clauses that prevented known criminals from associating with one other and led to diminished gang violence. At the same time, the Crimes Amendment Act 1930 was also passed, leading to six-month imprisonment terms for anyone found possessing cut-throat razors without good reason.

In 1935, newly appointed Sydney Police Commissioner MacKay summoned the feuding Devine and Leigh to his office. While he would not vigorously enforce anti-bootleg and anti-prostitution laws, he announced that the new police powers granted to his constabulary would be used against both women and their criminal enterprises unless there was immediate mitigation of gang violence and cocaine distribution. They did so, which left the New South Wales State Police able to concentrate their attention on the illicit cocaine trade in 1938/39. Following intensive policing of overseas supply routes, the cocaine trade finally began to ebb.

With the onset of the Second World War, gang figures enlisted and went to fight in the European and Pacific theatres of that conflict. Even the arrival of US service personnel did not reinvigorate the Leigh and Devine criminal empires, which now faced competition. With these events, the "razor gang" era drew to a close.

== Political metaphor ==
The term "razor gang" is used in Australian political discourse to refer to a group – often a committee – tasked with finding ways to cut government spending. It was first widely applied to the Fraser government's Review of Commonwealth Functions Committee, which was established in 1980 as a subcommittee of federal cabinet. It had three members – Industry and Commerce Minister Phillip Lynch (chairman), Treasurer John Howard, and Finance Minister Margaret Guilfoyle. The committee's report, handed down in May 1981, found 350 government functions that it believed could be eliminated, reduced, or transferred to other levels of government. This was to produce savings of $500 million. Other notable "razor gangs" have been established by the Rudd government (a group of about ten Department Finance officers) and the Abbott government (the Commission of Audit, comprising five commissioners appointed from outside the government).

== In popular culture ==
- Underbelly: Razor (21 August 2011 to 6 November 2011) is a 13-part TV dramatization of the razor gang era in Sydney.
- Peaky Blinders season 5 (2019) dramatizes interactions between the Billy Boys and the Peaky Blinders, in Depression-era Europe.

== See also ==
- Crime in Sydney
- Glasgow razor gangs
- History of Sydney
