= Eastern Suburbs Memorial Park =

Cemetery in Sydney, Australia

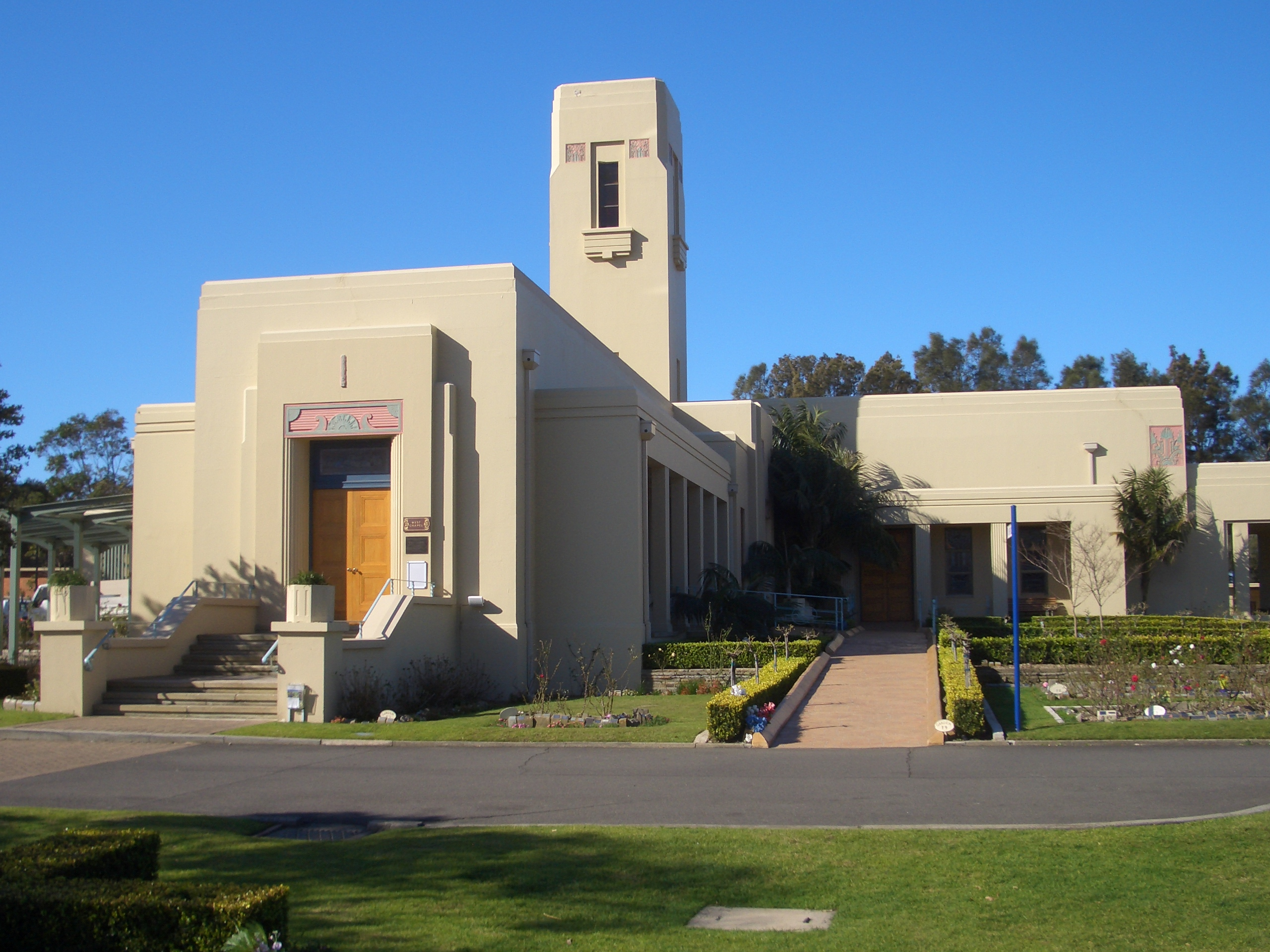
- The Crematorium Building, opened in 1938.
- Interactive map of Eastern Suburbs Memorial Park

Details
- Established: 10 January 1888
- Location: Military Road, Bomborah Point
- Country: Australia
- Coordinates: 33°58′28″S 151°13′39″E
- Size: 29 acres 2 roods 27 perches (12.01 ha)
- Website: Eastern Suburbs Memorial Park
- Find a Grave: Eastern Suburbs Memorial Park

Eastern Suburbs Memorial Park, Eastern Suburbs Crematorium and Botany General Cemetery (a.k.a. Botany Cemetery), is a cemetery and crematorium on Bunnerong Road in Matraville, New South Wales, in the eastern suburbs district of Sydney, Australia.

Land was dedicated as a cemetery site in 1888, with the first interment recorded at Botany Cemetery on 21 August 1893. The Bunnerong Cemetery (opened in 1888), and the Eastern Suburbs Crematorium (opened 1938) were merged with Botany Cemetery in 1972. There are more than 65,000 people buried there. A memorial park, Pioneer Park, is also within the grounds.

== History and management ==
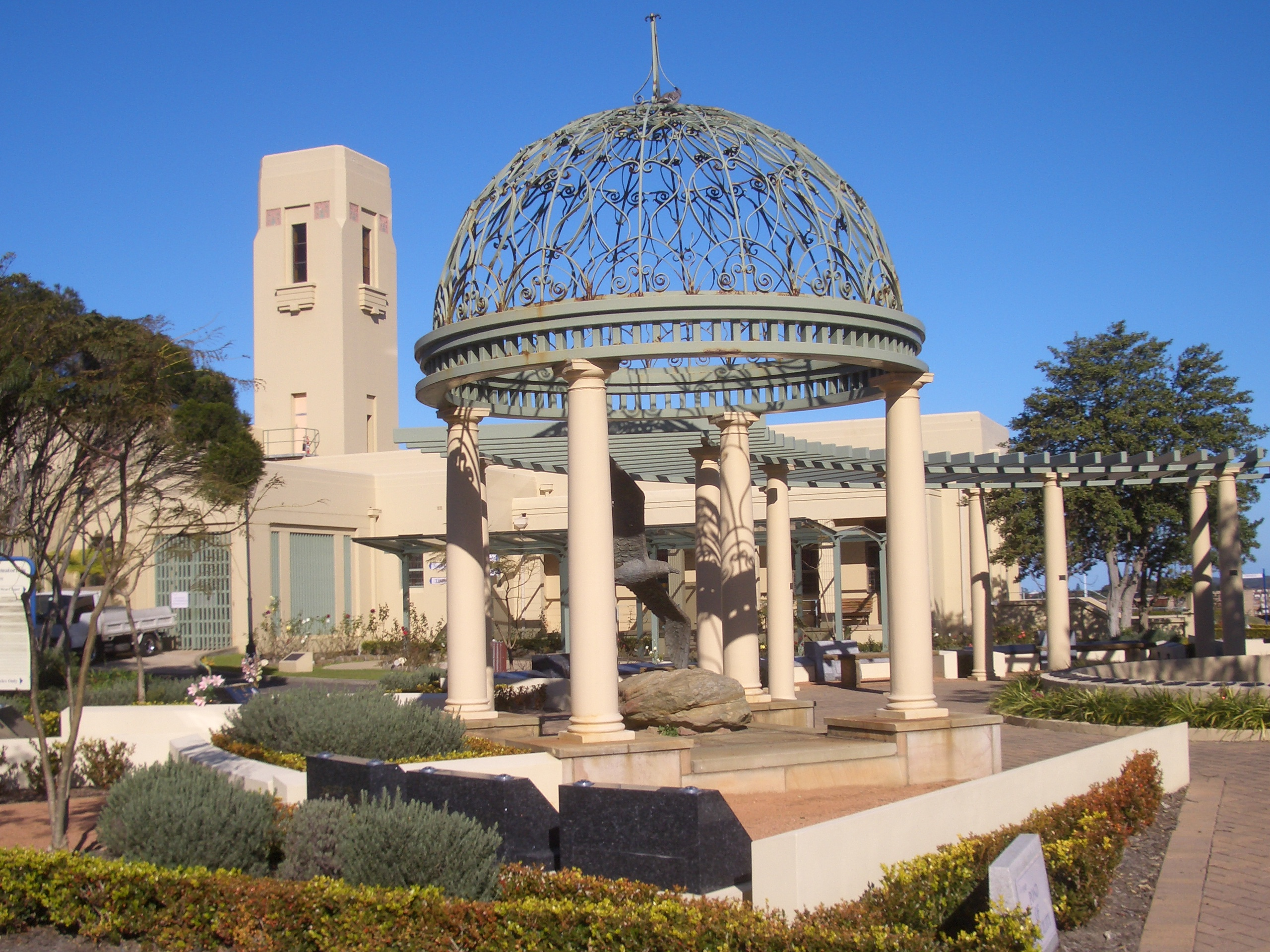
Memorial Garden

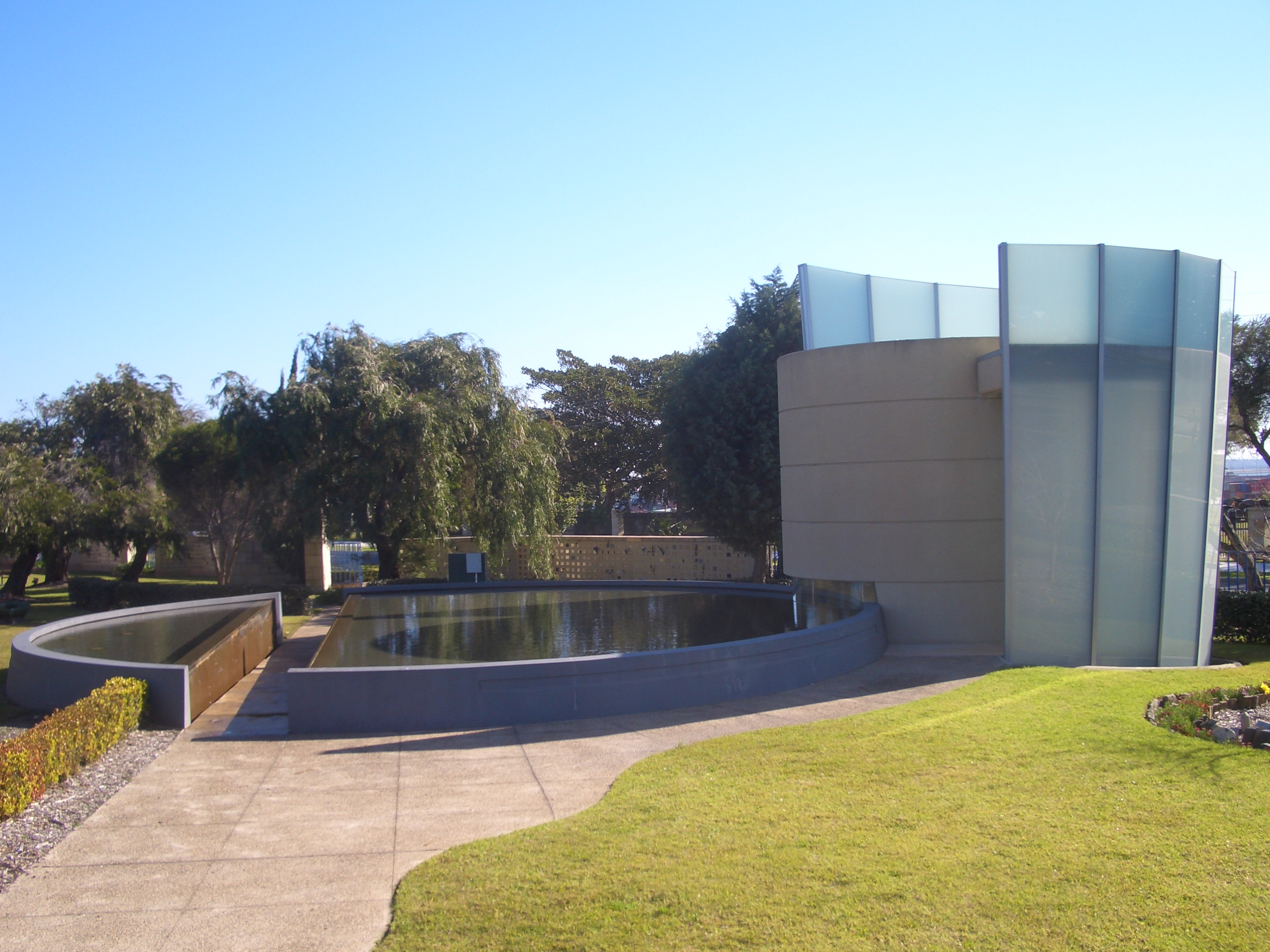
Memorial

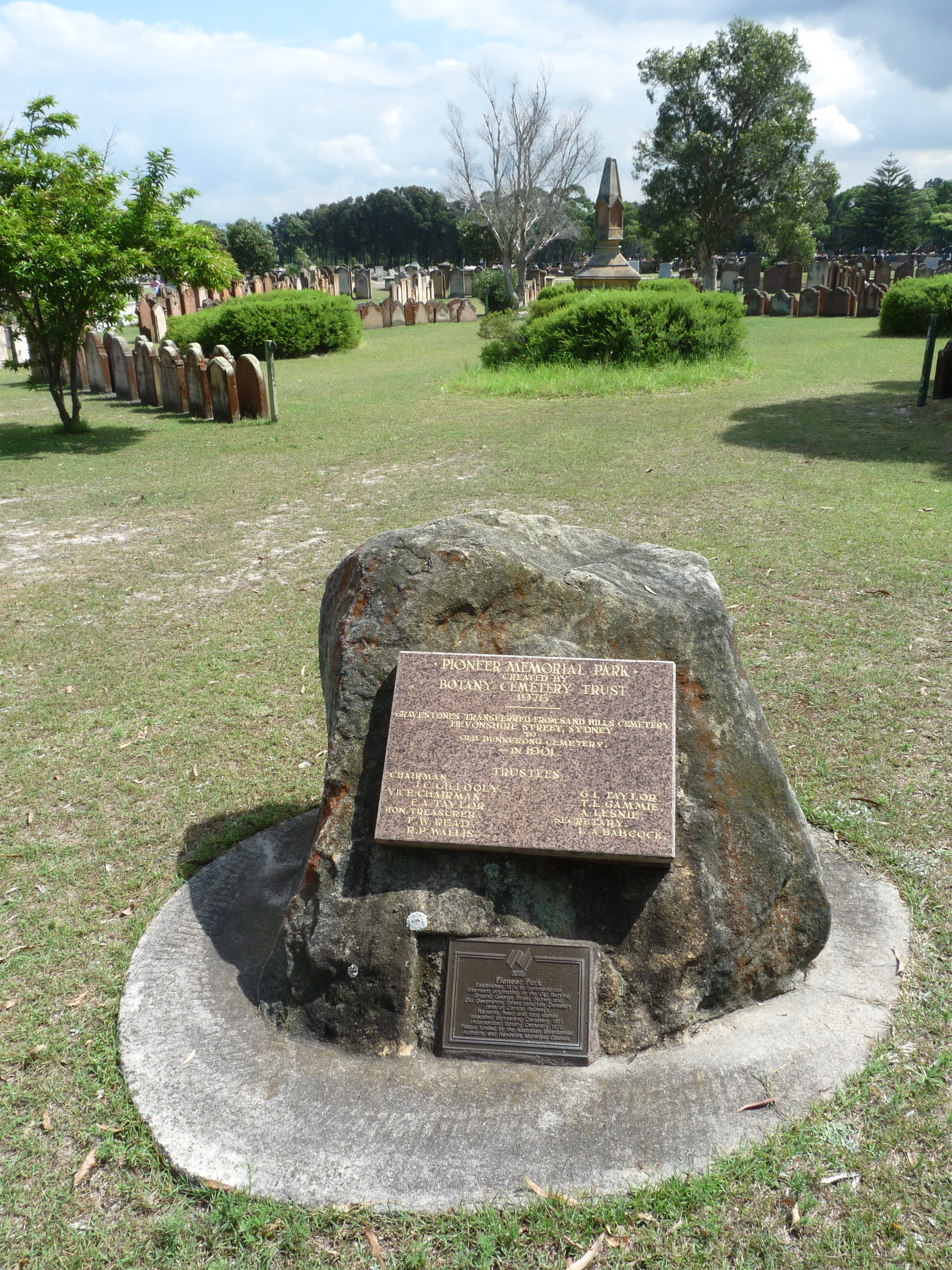
Pioneer Memorial Park Plaque

The cemetery was created as Bunnerong Cemetery in 1888, in order to accommodate unclaimed remains from the Devonshire Street Cemetery. It was merged with the Botany Cemetery (opened 1893) in 1972.

When the Botany Cemetery and Crematorium Act 1972 came into effect on 1 September 1972, Botany Cemetery and the Eastern Suburbs Crematorium were managed by the Botany Cemetery Trust and the Eastern Suburbs Crematorium Trust respectively. This act was repealed by the Cemeteries and Crematoria Act 2013, which came into effect on 24 October 2014 and created the Cemeteries and Crematoria NSW agency, which governs all cemeteries and crematoria in NSW. The Chairman of the Eastern Suburbs Memorial Park Board from 1 January 2005 to 3 August 2012 was the former police chief inspector and Mayor of Waverley, John Douglas Morrison.

The cemetery is managed by Southern Metropolitan Cemeteries NSW (officially "Southern Metropolitan Cemeteries Land Manager"), consisting of Woronora Memorial Park and Eastern Suburbs Memorial Park, which replaced the Botany Cemetery Trust and Eastern Suburbs Crematorium Trust upon gazettal on 3 August 2012.

== Eastern Suburbs Crematorium ==
Designed in 1937 in the Inter-war Art Deco style by architect Louis Leighton Robertson of Louis S. Robertson & Son, architects, and built by Lipscombe & Price, master builders of Bowral, the crematorium was praised as "dignified in classic lines, the design will be relieved by flutings of the columns and moulded panels". Robertson also designed crematoriums in a similar style at Woronora (1934), Kembla Grange (1955), and Beresfield (1936).

The crematorium was officially opened on 8 May 1938, by the local Member of Parliament for Botany, Bob Heffron, who later served as Premier of New South Wales and was buried in the crematorium grounds on his death in 1978.

== War graves ==
There are many graves commemorated by the Commonwealth War Graves Commission and maintained by the Office of Australian War Graves in locations spread throughout the Eastern Suburbs Memorial Park. The Botany General Cemetery section contains 157 burials: five Commonwealth burials of the First World War and 150 burials of the Second World War. There are also two Dutch Second World War burials maintained on behalf of the Dutch War Cemetery Organisation (Oorlogsgravenstichting). The Crematorium section contains 31 burials of the Second World War, comprising 30 Australian and one British burial. These include five Royal Australian Air Force servicemen killed in an Avro Anson crash at RAAF Richmond in December 1939. The remains of four Japanese sailors killed and recovered from the May 1942 Attack on Sydney Harbour were cremated and stored in the columbarium of the Crematorium until they were able to be returned to Japan by the returning Japanese Minister, Tatsuo Kawai, in August 1942.

== Pioneer Park ==
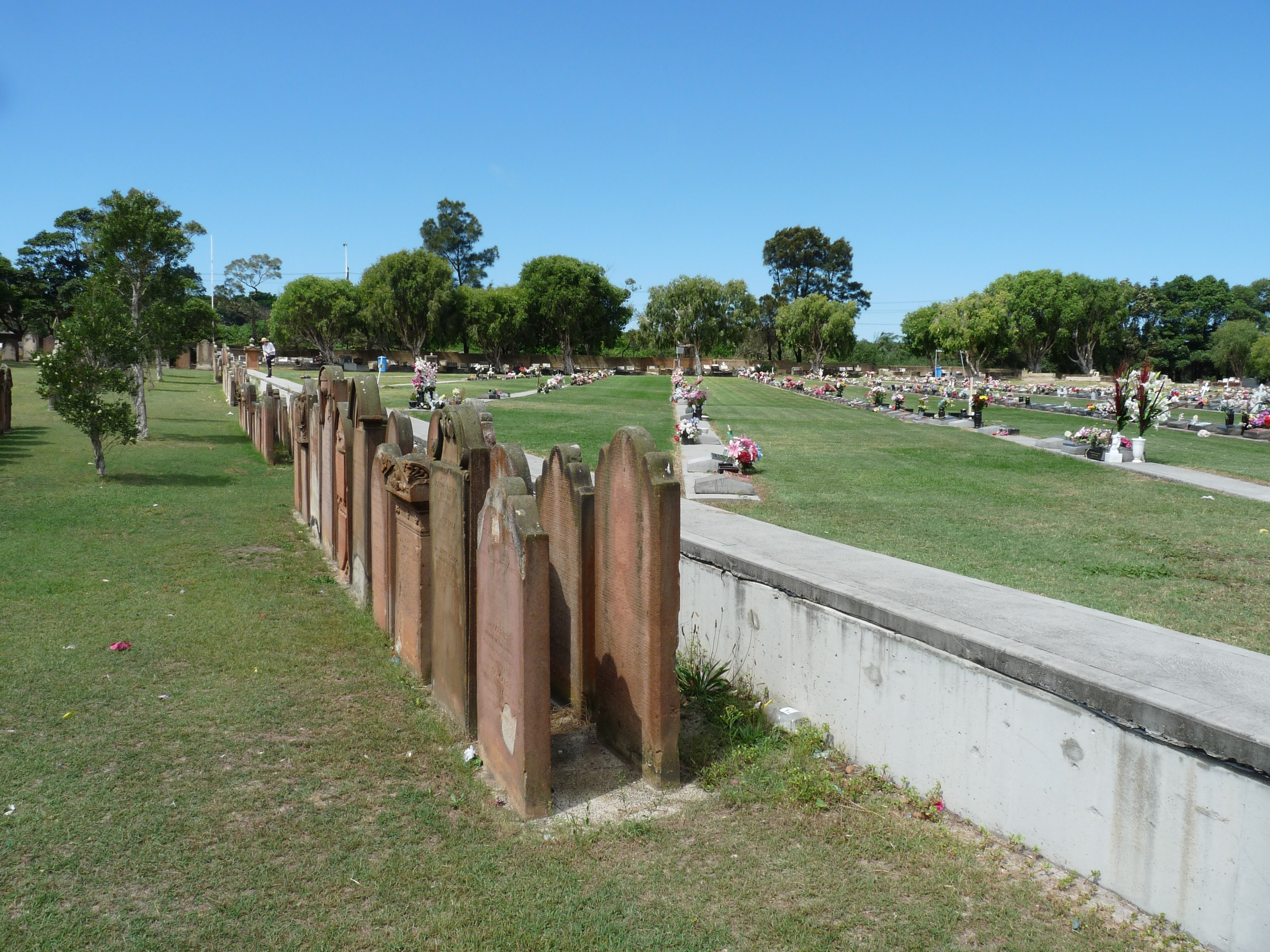
New Graves Over Pioneer Memorial Park in Botany Cemetery

Pioneer Park contains historic headstones which were relocated from Devonshire Street Cemetery in 1901 to make space for Central railway station. At that time, thousands of graves and 2825 tombstones of the first settlers in Australia were moved to the new cemetery at La Perouse, named Bunnerong Cemetery. In 1976, the Botany Cemetery Trust removed most of these monuments by creating a new, low maintenance lawn area. The remaining 746 headstones were reinstalled in concrete strips, unrelated to the graves below. The new lawn was named Pioneer Memorial Park. In May 2016 a series of statues were installed in this section to commemorate the First Fleet, with 12 of the 746 monuments in the park recording people who arrived on the First Fleet.

== Notable interments ==
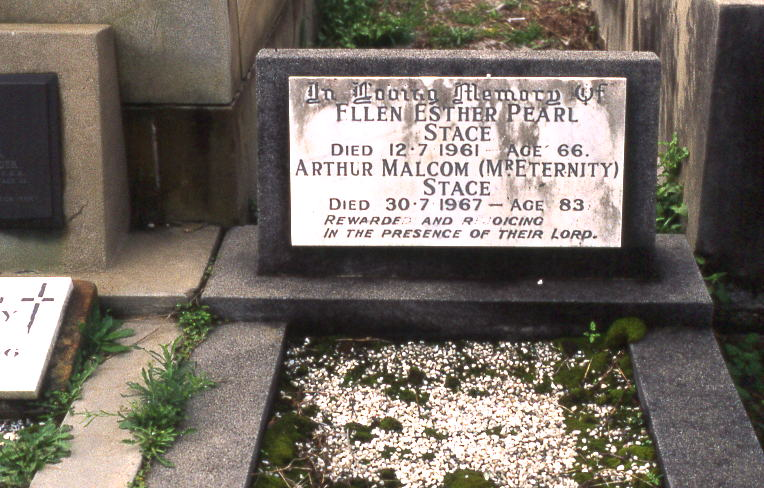
Arthur Stace's grave.

- Albert Burge (1889–1943), early rugby league and rugby union player
- Barney Dalton (1891–1929), former Eastern Suburbs rugby league player and gangster who was aligned with Kate Leigh during the 1920s "razor wars"
- John Dacey (1854–1912), Member of the NSW Legislative Assembly (1895–1912), Minister and namesake of Daceyville
- James Dooley (1877–1950), Member of the NSW Legislative Assembly (1907–27), and Premier of New South Wales (1921, 1921–22)
- Bill Dunn (1877–1951), Member of the NSW Legislative Assembly (1910–50) and Minister
- John Dunn (bushranger) (1846-1866), Bushranger
- Jock Garden (1882–1968), Member of the Australian House of Representatives (1934–37), trade unionist and founder of the Communist Party of Australia
- Bob Heffron (1890–1978), Member of the NSW Legislative Assembly (1930–68) and Premier of New South Wales (1959–64)
- Bede Kenny (1896–1953), 1917 recipient of the Victoria Cross
- Clarrie Martin (1900–1953), Member of the NSW Legislative Assembly and Attorney General (1941–53)
- Joseph Maxwell (1896–1967), 1918 recipient of the Victoria Cross
- Arthur Stace (1885–1967), former soldier famous as the Eternity pavement scribe
- Edward Milner Stephen (1870–1939), Alderman of the City of Sydney (1900–27), NSW Supreme Court judge (1929–1939)
- Ernest Tresidder (1875–1951), Mayor of Randwick, Member of the NSW Legislative Assembly and Alderman of Randwick and City of Sydney councils
- Blair Wark (1894–1941), 1918 recipient of the Victoria Cross
- Kate Leigh (1881–1964), Sydney Gangster involved in the Razor Wars of the 1920's and 1930's.
