= Kate Leigh =

Australian gangster (1881–1964)

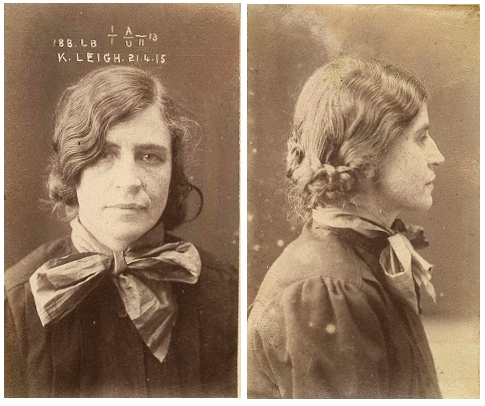
- Kate Leigh in April, 1915
- Born: Kathleen Mary Josephine Beahan; 10 March 1881; Dubbo, New South Wales
- Died: 4 February 1964 (aged 82); St Vincent's Hospital, Sydney
- Burial place: Eastern Suburbs Memorial Park
- Other names: Kathleen Lee; Kathleen Barry; Kathleen Ryan; Queen of the Underworld (nickname)
- Occupations: Gangster, brothel madam, cocaine trafficker
- Years active: c. 1920s–1950s
- Known for: Razor gangs; sly-grog and drug supply; prostitution; illegal gambling; philanthropy; feud with Tilly Devine
- Spouses: James Ernest Leigh (m. 1902, div. 1921); Edward Joseph Barry (m.1922, dec'd. 1948); Ernest Alexander Ryan (m. 1950, dec'd. 1954)

Kathleen Mary Josephine Leigh (née Beahan; 10 March 1881 – 4 February 1964) (other names included Kathleen Barry, and Kathleen Ryan) was an Australian underworld figure who rose to prominence as a madam, illegal trader of alcohol and cocaine, and for running betting/gambling syndicates from her home in Surry Hills, Sydney, Australia during the first half of the twentieth century. Leigh, known as the 'Queen of Surry Hills’, was a sly grogger and fence for stolen property. She was also known as the 'Snow Queen' due to her being the largest supplier of cocaine in Sydney.

She was a leading figure in the notorious Sydney razor gang wars. She was known for her continuing feud with fellow vice-regal underworld figure Tilly Devine, a madam based at Woolloomooloo, as well as her acts of generosity for the unemployed during a repressive era, and her wartime patriotism.

== Early life ==
Leigh was born on 10 March 1881 in Dubbo, New South Wales, the eighth child of Roman Catholic parents Timothy Beahan, a boot-maker, and his wife Charlotte (née Smith). Her childhood and teenaged years included childhood neglect, time in a girls' home at age 12, and an out-of-wedlock pregnancy; her daughter Eileen May Beahan was born in 1900.

== Marriages ==
=== James Leigh ===
Leigh married James Ernest (Jack) Lee (or Leigh) (1882–1959) on 2 May 1902. Lee was born in Tumut to a Chinese father and an Australian born mother, and became an illegal bookmaker and petty criminal. They separated in 1905 when Lee was imprisoned for assault and robbery. Following his trial, Kate Leigh was convicted of perjury and for being an accomplice to the assault, after being accused of lying under oath to protect her husband; her conviction was overturned on appeal. The marriage broke up soon after the trial, though they were not divorced until 1921. Kate anglicised her Chinese surname from Lee to Leigh, and she was mostly known by that name for the rest of her life, regardless of future marriages. Kate's daughter Eileen also used the name 'Leigh' until she married in 1920.

=== Edward Barry ===
Kate married for the second time on 26 September 1922, to a Western Australian-born musician Edward Joseph 'Teddy' Barry (1892–1948), a sly-grog dealer and small-time criminal. The marriage only lasted for a few years, after which she reverted to using her previous surname of 'Leigh'. Though long separated, he died in Kate's home at 2 Lansdowne Street, Surry Hills on 26 June 1948, and was buried at Botany Cemetery three days later.

=== Walter Tomlinson ===
During the late 1920s Kate lived with Walter "Wally" Tomlinson (or Thomlinson) (c.1899–1968), whom she had employed as one of her bodyguards. He was charged in 1916, at age 16, with Shooting At, With Intent To Murder and had a reputation as a tough standover criminal by the late 1920s. That relationship—which featured prominently in an Australian television drama on Leigh's role in the razor gang wars—ended with Tomlinson's departure, and Leigh then pursued a de facto relationship from 1932 to 1949 with her business partner, Henry 'Jack' Baker (1897–1965).

=== Ernest Ryan ===
Her third and last marriage was at St John's Anglican Church, Fremantle, on 18 January 1950, to old friend and convicted criminal Ernest Alexander "Shiner" Ryan. They were separated six months later, and Ryan died in Western Australia in 1954.

== Career ==
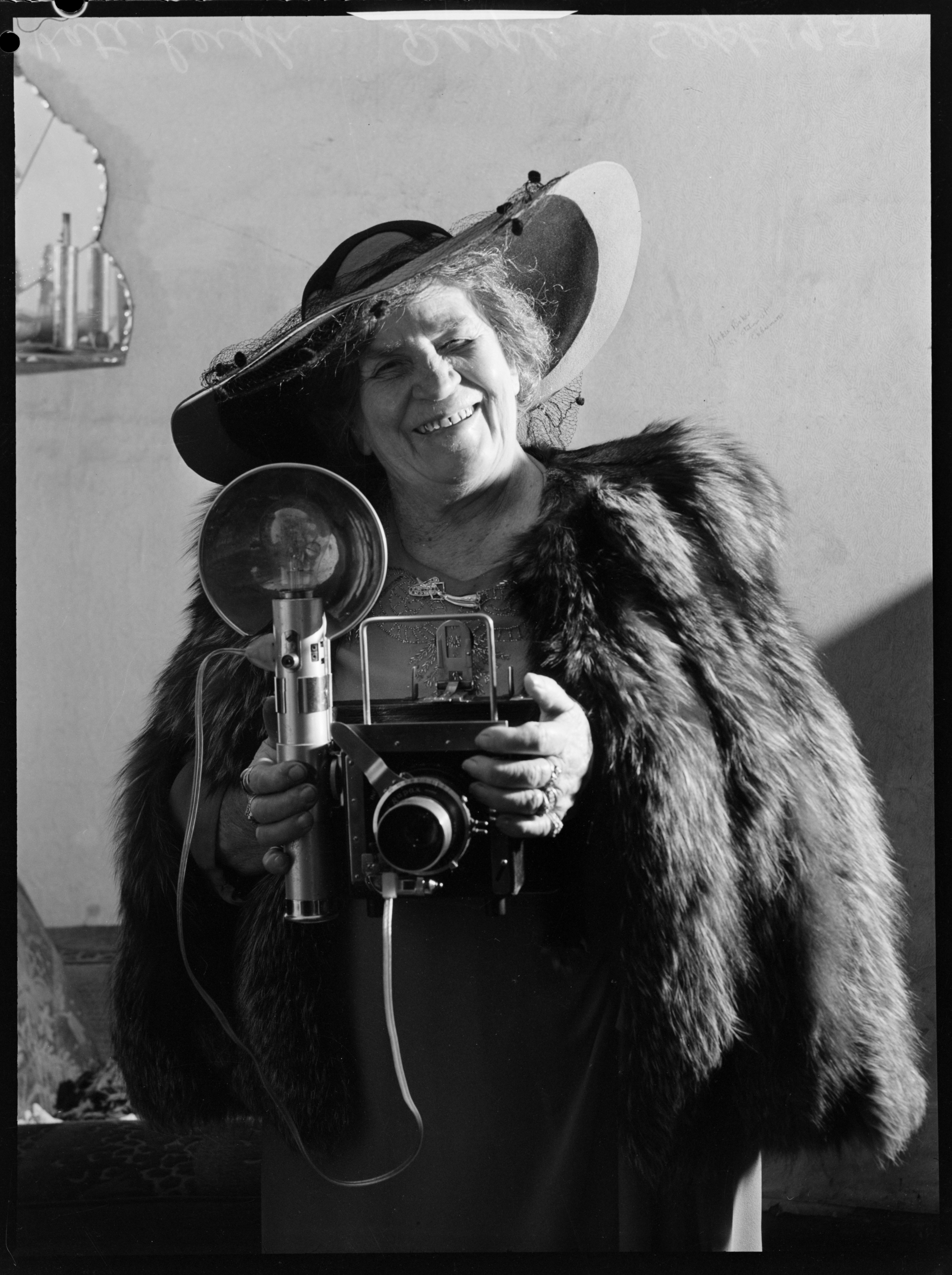
Sydney underworld figure Kate Leigh, holding a graphlex camera, 1951

Leigh earned income, variously over these years, as a sly-grog trader, drug dealer, and as a madam; she became a major New South Wales (NSW) underworld figure, and has been referred to as its "Queen of the Underworld." From 1919 to 1955 Leigh's main enterprise was the highly profitable sly-grog trade, which ensued after the NSW State Parliament legislated for six o'clock closing of drinking establishments (governed by the Liquor Act 1916, Liquor Licensing Act 1927). At its peak, Leigh ran at least twenty bootleg outlets. Although she made much of her fortune from the illegal sale of alcohol, Leigh is reported to have never drunk (or smoked).

Leigh also exploited the passage of the Dangerous Drugs Amendment Act 1927 in NSW by providing lucrative illicit criminal distribution networks for the high-demand cocaine it criminalised. Leigh derived her supplies from a corrupt network of doctors, dentists, chemists, and sailors, and amassed considerable wealth from the activity. These activities—the defence of these business turfs—and ongoing feuds with rival organised crime leaders in NSW led Leigh to be a prominent figure in Sydney's brutal razor gang wars of the 1920s and 1930s.

Hence, from her Surry Hills home she became an organised crime entrepreneur, charging excessive prices for a full range of illicit goods and services, including after-hours drinking venues, sly-grog, prostitution, illegal betting, gambling and, from the mid-1920s, cocaine trafficking. Leigh obtained loyalty and protection from a male network of gangsters, but often had to protect them and was adept with a rifle. Rival gangs eroded her profits from cocaine by standing over and slashing decoys (often working prostitutes) with razors.

Leigh was also engaged in a violent feud with her rival Tilly Devine, a Sydney madam based in Woolloomooloo that lasted 20 years. The two women physically fought one another on numerous occasions and their respective gangs conducted pitched battles in Eaton Avenue and Kellet Street, King's Cross in May and August 1929. In 1936, newly appointed Sydney Police Commissioner MacKay warned them both to tone down the violence or else risk serious imprisonment. The NSW Police also intensively policed incoming vessels for overseas cocaine suppliers in 1938–39, but it was naval transit restrictions associated with the World War II that led to devastating interruptions of Leigh's overseas cocaine supply.

Leigh was also personally involved in violence, though she was never convicted of any such offence. On 27 March 1930, she shot and killed John William "Snowy" Prendergast when he and other gangsters broke into her home at 104 Riley Street, East Sydney. She was not indicted for the killing, or for shooting Joseph McNamara nearby in Liverpool St, Darlinghurst on 9 December 1931.

However, Leigh was imprisoned on drug-related charges. In July 1930, Leigh's house at 104 Riley Street was raided by a NSW drug squad, including Sydney's most famous policewoman, Lillian Armfield. Leigh was found in possession of cocaine and was sentenced to 12 months imprisonment.

Through alleged personal connections throughout officialdom, she continued business throughout the 1930s and 40s despite frequent police raids and a mass of minor convictions. She was charged on 107 occasions and was sent to prison on 13 occasions. Appearing in courtrooms with flamboyantly expensive clothes and diamonds, her wealth was legendary. When appearing in court, Kate would wear diamond rings on every finger of both hands. During her heyday, Kate Leigh owned and operated more than thirty different sly grog hotels at different locations in inner Sydney that generated thousands of pounds in profit annually.

She lived in a terrace house at 2 Lansdowne Street, Surry Hills from 1933 until the house was demolished in 1950. This house was also used by Leigh as her main illegal hotel or Sly-grog shop during this time and was known in Sydney as the Lansdowne Hotel, not to be confused with the legal 'Lansdowne Hotel' in City Road, Broadway. Her then de facto husband and bodyguard, Henry George "Jack" Baker, was shot outside this house by the well known Sydney criminal, John 'Chow' Hayes on 19 February 1938. The house was raided by undercover police on 4 March 1938 resulting in 48 bottles and 4 kegs of beer being confiscated. Three months later a police witness at Sydney Licensing Court stated that the premises at 2 Lansdowne Street, Surry Hills was "a notorious sly grog shop – The Worst in Sydney". Kate Leigh was sentenced to 6 months imprisonment on 7 September 1942 for having sold liquor without a licence at 13 Pearl Street and 2 Lansdowne Street, Surry Hills.

== Bankruptcy and decline ==
Leigh was undoubtedly one of Sydney's wealthiest women during the 1930s and 1940s but the Taxation Office sent her into bankruptcy in 1954 for unpaid income tax and fines dating back to 1942. Leigh's Statement of Affairs was given at a Bankruptcy Court hearing in Sydney on 30 September 1954 as "Assets of £1960 consisting of furniture and three properties in Devonshire Street". Her Liabilities were shown as £7130. In 1955 the NSW government changed the law to allow legal hotels to serve alcohol until 10 pm, an act that virtually killed off the Sydney sly-grog trade and put purveyors such as Leigh out of business. Leigh was famously quoted in the Australian media as stating "The bloom has gone off the grog".

At the time of her death, aged 82, Kate Leigh was living in virtual poverty in a small room above one of her old illegal hotels at 212 Devonshire Street, Surry Hills and was financially dependent on her nephew, William John Beahan, who ran a mixed business in the shop in the downstairs part of the premises. She resided at 212 Devonshire Street, Surry Hills from 1951 until her death in 1964.

== Death ==
Continuing to live at Surry Hills, she suffered a severe stroke on 31 January 1964 at her residence at 212 Devonshire Street and was rushed to hospital. She died on 4 February 1964 at St Vincent's Hospital in Darlinghurst, and her funeral was held on 7 February at St Peter's Catholic Church in Devonshire Street, Surry Hills and was attended by over 700 mourners. She was buried in Botany Cemetery, now known as Eastern Suburbs Memorial Park in the Roman Catholic Section 29K, Grave 896 as Kathleen Ryan. She was survived by her daughter, Eileen May Ranson (née Beahan, 1900–1987). Leigh was remembered by the press as much for her patriotism during World War II and for generous charitable acts in support of the unemployed in harsh times as for her criminal history.

== Popular culture ==
Kate Leigh and Tilly Devine's criminal feud was the subject of a 13-episode true crime television drama on Australia's Nine Network, titled Underbelly: Razor, which was the fourth in the Underbelly anthology series, it screened between 21 August 2011 until 16 November. Leigh was portrayed by Danielle Cormack, with Tilly Devine played by Chelsie Preston Crayford, the series itself was based on a Ned Kelly Award winning book written by Chris Walker.
