= Sly-grog shop =

Australian term for place that sells low quality alcohol without a license

In Australia, a sly-grog shop (or shanty) is an unlicensed hotel, liquor-store or other vendor of alcoholic beverages, sometimes with the added suggestion of selling poor-quality products. From the time of the First World War until as late as the 1960s (in Victoria and South Australia), much of Australia had early closing of hotels and pubs serving alcoholic beverages. The term is also used to denote illegal sales in Indigenous areas where alcohol has been banned or restricted.

== Etymology ==
The Australian slang term "sly grog" combines two older English slang terms:

(1) "on the sly", meaning "in a secret, clandestine, or covert manner, without publicity or openness". James Hardy Vaux's Vocabulary of the Flash Language (1812) defined the term "upon the sly": "Any business transacted, or intimation given, privately, or under the rose, is said to be done "upon the sly".

(2) "grog", a Naval term originally referring to a rum and water mixture. In the Australian context "grog" was used to describe diluted, adulterated and sub-standard rum. In the early decades of the Australian colonies "grog" was often the only alcoholic beverage available to the working classes. Eventually in Australia the word "grog" came to be used as a slang term for any alcoholic beverage.

== History ==
The term "sly grog" evolved into general usage in Australia during the 1820s. An early reference comes from the Hobart Town Gazette of 18 March 1825: "We therefore felt convinced that in the sequel they would altogether decline applying for licenses, whilst many of them would become sly grog-men to the manifest injury of Government".

=== Rural context ===
Sly-grog shops eventually expanded from their urban context and increased in numbers in rural areas during the period of progressive establishment of farms and pastoral runs in south-east Australia (generally distant from police and bureaucratic control). From the 1850s, cattle began to be replaced by sheep on the extensive pastoral runs along the inland rivers. Large numbers of workers were required to manage the sheep, particularly at shearing time. Sly-grog shops provided station-hands and shearers from the surrounding areas with a focus for entertainment, social interaction and drunkenness. There were few townships at that time, and law enforcement was over-stretched in these areas. In consequence, sly-grog shops (sometimes of the travelling variety) became an institution in these districts, often associated with particular pastoral runs or situated along mail-routes. As townships and police-stations became established and more numerous along the inland rivers in the latter half of the 19th century the sly-grog shops tended more often to be found on the back-blocks and regions further inland, following the squatters and their workers as they developed more marginal areas.

The following example from the Lower Murrumbidgee region of New South Wales is indicative of efforts carried out by police and magistrates in an attempt to thwart the sale of sly-grog. On 31 December 1869 Edward Harpur appeared before the Bench of Magistrates at the Hay Police Court, charged with "carrying spirits for the purpose of sale". Sergeant Macnamara had arrested Harpur along the Murrumbidgee River west of Hay "on the road to Mr. Severne's station".

On examining the cart [Sergeant Macnamara] found about two cases of gin, some brandy, and lemonade. Some of the grog, it was evident, was intended for one of the shanties down the river, although it was attempted to prove otherwise. After hearing all the evidence very patiently, together with the remarks that were offered by Sub-Inspector Creaghe, with a view of sustaining the conviction, in which the inspector pointed out to their Worships in forcible terms and eloquent language how rife this system of sly-grog selling was becoming, and the many ways that there were of evading the law, and how necessary it was for the protection of the public that these proceedings should be nipped in the bud, he clearly proved that this was a case in which it was attempted to evade the law by placing false tickets upon the cases under the pretence that the grog was intended for private use, instead of for illegal sale; and called their Worships' attention to the fact that part at least of the spirits was intended for parties who were in the habit of selling spirits without license, and one of whom had been convicted for such an offence – the Bench retired for consultation, and on returning expressed their conviction that the prisoner had failed to prove that he was not carrying the grog for the purpose of sale, and that therefore the whole of the spirits, together with the cart, horse, and harness, were confiscated to the Crown.

=== 1857 newspaper reference ===
Extract from the article Our Social Position: Baneful Effects of Sly-grog Selling (1857):

Sly-grog shops are positively the curse of the country, and to these dens of infamy and shame can many a single hearted youth trace the ruin of his character, and his initiation into every species of evil and immorality. At these places will be found congregated the known thieves and blackguards of a district; there they inveigle the unthinking, induce the habit of rum-drinking, and at last lead them from one illegal act to another, until the scholar becomes as proficient as the master in the practice of robbery and stealing the property of others. It is a question, which bears strongly on our moral and social standing as a people, how the sly-grog shops are to be extirpated; and surely it is a question which ought to be earnestly taken up in Parliament, which is as much bound to preserve the morals as the liberties of the people. Sly-grog shops are worse than nuisances; they are gangrenes eating away the morality and religion of the denizens of the bush, they are deadly fountains, diffusing poison and death around the neighbourhoods where they are found. These wretched sly-grog sellers are the pests of society, they are the secret underminers of its pillars, and if they are not shortly eradicated, our Quarter Sessions and our Circuit Courts will be the revelation of their accursed doings.

== Indigenous areas ==
In some areas, such as the ten islands of the Palm Island, Queensland which come under the administration of the Aboriginal Shire of Palm Island, alcohol sales are heavily restricted, and there are stiff penalties for sales of "sly grog". Anangu Pitjantjatjara Yankunytjatjara in South Australia is another example where restrictions have been imposed in consultation with local Aboriginal elders, in order to combat alcohol abuse and alcohol-related crime.

== Literary quotes ==
- Tom came home that night from Bob O'Brien's, who kept a sly grog shop, quite tipsy. His poor wife shrank from him in sorrow, and his children crowded round their mother as if afraid of him. Alas! what wretchedness, what misery does this dreadful vice bring with it! [from "Susan's Dream", Tales for the Bush (1845) by Mary Theresa Vidal].
- She was a hard-looking woman – just the sort that might have kept a third-rate pub or a sly-grog shop. [from "The Blindness of One-eyed Bogan" (1907) by Henry Lawson]
- Sad to relate Red Fred, for the first time in his life, found himself possessed of a class-conscious spirit. It had been all right to call each other Jimmy and Fred in the days when he was a shearer and the Chinaman used to visit the sheds with his hawker's cart which was really a travelling sly-grog shop. Things were different now. [from Chapter VI – The Big Wager, The Shearer's Colt (1936) by Andrew Barton "Banjo" Paterson].

== See also ==
- Shebeen
- Speakeasy
