= Underbelly: A Tale of Two Cities =

- A Tale of Two Cities logo
- No. of episodes: 13

Release
- Original network: Nine Network
- Original release: 9 February – 4 May 2009

Series chronology
- ← Previous; Underbelly Next → The Golden Mile

Underbelly: A Tale of Two Cities, the second series of the Nine Network crime drama series Underbelly, originally aired from 9 February 2009 to 4 May 2009. It is a thirteen-part series loosely based on real events that stemmed from the marijuana trade centred on the New South Wales town of Griffith. The timeline of the series is the years between 1976 and 1987. Underbelly: A Tale of Two Cities primarily depicts the Mr. Asia drug syndicate and its influence on crime in Australia. Among the characters presented are real-life criminals Robert Trimbole, Terry Clark, George Freeman, Christopher Dale Flannery, Alphonse Gangitano and the Kane Brothers. The mini-series is a prequel to the 2008 production Underbelly, which was about the Melbourne gangland killings and forms part of the Underbelly series.

The series premiered on the Nine Network on 9 February at 8.30pm, with the double episode premiere attracting an average of 2,501,500 viewers nationally, in the mainland capitals. The show has consistently rated highly, being the most watched show on Australian television for all episodes broadcast so far. In New Zealand, the series began broadcast on 4 March where it has been advertised as Underbelly: The Mr Asia Story. This name stems from the common misidentification of protagonist Terry Clark as "Mr Asia". "Mr Asia" was in fact the name assigned to Marty Johnstone by Auckland reporter Pat Booth in his series of investigative newspaper articles into the Mr Asia drug syndicate. Johnstone was both Clark's business partner and victim. Underbelly: A Tale of Two Cities is the second in the Underbelly series, and was followed by Underbelly: The Golden Mile.

== Synopsis ==
The series is a broadly fictional account of the Australian criminal underworld, loosely based on events in New South Wales and Victoria between 1976 and 1987. The story revolves around the organised crime groups that stemmed from the Griffith-based marijuana trade, led by "Aussie Bob" Trimbole (Roy Billing) and "Kiwi Terry" Clark (Matthew Newton).

New Zealand drug trafficker Clark arrives in Sydney with plans to establish a heroin racket. He meets with marijuana-grower Trimbole but is at first rebuffed and bashed by crime figure George Freeman (Peter O'Brien). Soon however, he convinces Trimbole he is genuine and the two establish a partnership. The activities of local politician Donald Mackay (Andrew McFarlane) put their plans in jeopardy and when attempts to extort and blackmail him fail, Trimbole decides to have him killed without informing anyone. Trimbole and his right-hand man, Gianfranco "Frank" Tizzoni (Tony Poli), visit Melbourne to organise the hit. Detective Liz Cruickshank (Asher Keddie) is tipped off about the murder plot but her boss Joe Messina (Peter Phelps) discredits the informant, Les Kane (Martin Dingle-Wall), as unreliable. When Mackay is murdered by James Frederick Bazley (Scott Burgess), the efforts of detective Warwick Mobbs (Matt Passmore) to investigate are stymied by high-level police corruption that leads to him being posted to rural NSW.

Clark has soon established the Mr Asia syndicate in Sydney. Allison Dine (Anna Hutchison) arrives in Australia with her boyfriend but soon becomes Clark's lover and major accomplice as she devises a new method of passing the drugs through Customs. Meanwhile, Trimbole helps Melbourne armed robber Ray 'Chuck' Bennett (Nathan Page) organise a major heist in defiance of local stand-over men Les and Brian Kane (Tim McCunn), who demand a cut of any loot. After Bennett cuts reckless bully Chris Flannery (Dustin Clare) from his team, Flannery informs the Kanes, touching off a turf war. When two of Bennett's crew steal some of Trimbole's money from the Kanes, the violence escalates until Les Kane is machine-gunned to death in front of his family. The brutal murder ends up isolating Bennett, who is now wanted dead by a coalition including Brian Kane, Chris Flannery and Alphonse Gangitano (Elan Zavelsky). After his arrest for other crimes he decides to remain in prison, where he benefits from the protection of Mark "Chopper" Read (Renato Fabretti), to prevent his enemies outside from reaching him. He stands trial for Les' murder but is acquitted; however, while being led into court on another matter, a disguised Brian Kane shoots him dead in the middle of the court with the assistance of corrupt policemen.

Clark, his middleman in Singapore Andy Maher (Damon Gameau), and fellow Kiwi couriers Doug and Isabelle Wilson (Gareth Reeves and Simone Kessell) travel to Queensland. After throwing a wild party in a hotel room, Clark is arrested on a gun charge and extradited back to New Zealand. Doug Wilson cracks under police questioning and reveals the location where Pommy Lewis (Sam Anderson) was buried, after his murder by Terry Clark. Clark's lawyer Karen Soich (Katie Wall) becomes his new lover after he is acquitted. Clark obtains a tape of Doug's interview with Queensland Police and asks Trimbole and Tizzoni to kill them, and Tizzoni again hires Bazley for the job.

Clark goes to England to expand his business. Bazley completes the Wilson hit but the bodies are found almost immediately, finally causing the Victorian and Federal police to form a join taskforce led by David Priest (Jonny Pasvolsky), and including Mobbs, Cruickshank, Messina and a Sydney CIB detective Trevor Hakens (Dieter Brummer) with links to Dennis Kelly's (Paul Tassone) bent NSW cops. Kelly's corrupt detectives attempt to take control of the drug trade, while working to deceive the interstate police by closing down George Freeman's casinos. Allison questions her role in the syndicate after being threatened by corrupt narcotics agent Jack Smith (Samuel Johnson), who ultimately plants drugs on her in order to arrest her. Freeman begins to aggressively push into other avenues of crime, and is subsequently shot in the head by an intruder outside his home, which he survives.

Now in exile in Britain, Clark becomes paranoid upon learning of Allison's arrest, and after a meeting with Trimbole, convinces him to have Allison murdered. Reluctantly, Trimbole hires Chris Flannery, but when Smith arrests her on a trumped-up possession charge, he calls off the hit. When Clark himself also changes his mind and orders the hit called off, Trimbole helps Allison flee to America. Meanwhile, Freeman recovers from his wound while his friend, stand-over man Lenny McPherson (John McNeill), murders his would-be killer. Back in Britain, Clark and Maher meet with "Mr. Asia" a.k.a. Marty Johnstone (Merrick Watts), their supplier in Singapore. After Johnnstone offers various excuses about the poor quality of recent heroin shipments, Clark decides that he can no longer be trusted, and instructs Andy Maher to execute him.

Days later, British police find Johnstone's body and arrest Clark. Allison Dine is apprehended by the FBI and returned to Australia to turn star witness against her former lover. Trimbole learns of a massive shipment of Lebanese cannabis from his friend Dr Nick Paltos (Wadih Dona) and makes plans to import it. In the meantime, legal secretary and mob lawyer Brian Alexander (Damian de Montemas) comes under intense police scrutiny as the weakest link in the syndicate. Allison implicates the entire syndicate and provides evidence linking Trimbole to the Mr. Asia syndicate. The prime minister announces a Royal Commission and disbands the Federal Narcotics Bureau; the move ultimately results in Jack Smith and nearly 150 equally corrupt Narcotics agents being demoted to customs agent-status. But due to Trevor Haken alerting his friends in the NSW Police of the impending bust, George Freeman tips off Trimbole, who is able to flee overseas. Brian Alexander, by then having fallen into alcoholism due to stress, is fired from his position and shunned by his former allies Freeman and Trimbole. The NSW police determine that he knows too much and could spill the beans in an interrogation: Dennis Kelly and his partner Jim Egan (Daniel Roberts) lure him to a yacht where they kill him by dumping him into the sea with his feet attached to a stove. Meanwhile, Frank Tizzoni is arrested in Griffith as he was driving a van loaded with marijuana. After some time in custody he agrees to cut a deal with Messina, giving him evidence of Trimbole and Clark's involvement in the murder of the Wilsons. The taskforce furthermore begins suspecting Haken of leaking intel.

Allison testifies against Clark in England, who is convicted for murder and sentenced to twenty years. Now on the run in Ireland, Trimbole becomes an arms dealer for the IRA while also working with Paltos to fund the import of cannabis into Australia. Chris Flannery moves to Sydney and approaches Freeman for work, slaying a number of high-profile drug dealers in order to make a name for himself. But his uncontrollable temper and psychotic ego make him a target of the NSW Police and Freeman. Freeman ultimately arranges for Flannery to be executed, after manipulating Flannery into eliminating the various mobsters who have taken over the drug trade in Trimbole's absence.

Clark suffers a heart attack in prison and dies. With the net tightening on him, Trimbole, dying of prostate cancer, is arrested in Ireland on a trumped-up gun trafficking charge. Before the Australian police can bring evidence against him, however, he is released and flees to Spain. Meanwhile, Paltos completes the drug shipment, but Mobbs arrests him immediately; Haken is prevented from narcing on Paltos via his friends in the NSW police and is confronted. However, Haken refuses to turn against his fellow corrupt cops and, without any hard evidence, is swiftly ejected from the Joint Police Group. Paltos also refuses to co-operate, but Trimbole accidentally gives away his location to the task force in a bugged phone conversation. Priest rushes to arrest Trimbole, but arrives too late as Trimbole dies right before he enters his room

The series' epilogue states that Freeman and McPherson continue their illegal businesses for another decade or so, Laurie Prendergast (Teo Gebert) goes missing after Flannery's death (with it implied that Freeman had him murdered) and the corrupt NSW police continued their illicit operations. The final scene has Kelly and Haken, their luggage packed full of heroin and cocaine, going through customs as the corrupt Jack Smith waves his drug carrying friends through security. As the camera lingers upon Trevor's face, the narrator (Caroline Craig) talks about how the NSW police would ultimately fall due to one man (Haken), but suggests this would be "a whole other story".

== Episodes ==
No. overall	No. in series	Title	Directed by	Written by	Original release date
14	1	"Aussie Bob & Kiwi Terry"	Ken Cameron	Peter Gawler	9 February 2009
In the debut double episode set in 1976, drug dealers Terry Clark and Robert Trimbole form a partnership in the heroin trade. Trimbole orders a hit on local Griffith anti-drugs campaigner Donald Mackay. In Melbourne, Detective Liz Cruickshank is tipped off about the hit by standover man Les Kane, but her boss Inspector Messina doubts Kane's story.
15	2	"Bad Habits"	Ken Cameron	Peter Gawler	9 February 2009
Detective Warwick Mobbs suspects police corruption as his efforts to solve Mackay's murder are constantly frustrated. In the meantime, Melbourne armed robber Chuck Bennett masterminds the Great Bookie Robbery but snubs Kane and his brother Brian, provoking a turf war.
16	3	"Brave New World"	Shawn Seet	Felicity Packard	16 February 2009
Allison Dine arrives in Sydney from New Zealand and begins working for Clark as a drug courier, soon becoming his lover. Mobbs endeavours to investigate George Freeman and shut down his illegal bookmaking activities, but is tharwted by high-level police corruption and reassigned to Wagga Wagga. Clark murders drug mule Pommy Lewis.
17	4	"Business as Usual"	Shawn Seet	Felicity Packard	23 February 2009
The Kanes are now protectors for Trimbole's dealers in Melbourne. When two members of Bennett's gang steal from one of the dealers, the Kanes use it as an excuse for revenge. After several confrontations, Bennett and his associates machine-gun Les Kane to death in his home in front of his family in 1978. In Sydney, Allison devises a new way to smuggle Clark's drugs.
18	5	"A Tale of Two Hitmen"	Tony Tilse	Kris Mrksa	2 March 2009
Chuck Bennett goes on trial for Les Kane's death, but in the absence of a body is acquitted. Brian Kane hires Chris Flannery to kill Bennett, but Bennett is immediately re-arrested on another charge. Wearing a disguise, Kane murders Bennett as he is taken to court. In Sydney, Terry and Allison's affair cools and Trimbole accidentally gets George Freeman arrested.
19	6	"Stranded"	Tony Tilse	Kris Mrksa	9 March 2009
Clark is arrested on a minor charge in Queensland and extradited to New Zealand to face drug charges. His couriers the Wilsons crack under police pressure and the body of Pommy Lewis is discovered. After being acquitted, Clark returns to Australia. Trimbole convinces him to have the Wilsons killed.
20	7	"A Nice Little Earner"	Tony Tilse	Kris Mrksa	16 March 2009
Terry decides to franchise his crime empire and expand into the UK market. Allison is promoted to a major role in the organisation.
21	8	"Diamonds"	Shawn Seet	Greg Haddrick	23 March 2009
The Federal police team up with the Victorians to target the drug trade, while NSW's corrupt cops plan to seize control of organised crime. Allison questions her role in the syndicate after she is threatened by a corrupt Federal Narcotics Bureau agent. Meanwhile, George Freeman takes extreme action after police raid his illegal casinos and is shot outside his home.
22	9	"Judas Kiss"	Shawn Seet	Felicity Packard	30 March 2009
Clark, paranoid and living in exile in the UK, pressures Trimbole to take out a contract on Allison. Trimbole hires Chris Flannery but Allison is arrested before he can act. She flees to the US with Trimbole's help. Meanwhile, Clark has his major supplier Marty Johnstone murdered when a deal goes wrong, and Freeman's would-be assassin is executed.
23	10	"The Reckoning"	Grant Brown	Felicity Packard	20 April 2009
Clark is arrested in the UK for Johnstone's murder. Allison is arrested by the FBI and turns star witness against the syndicate. With the heroin money drying up Trimbole plans to import an enormous cannabis shipment. The Feds see Brian Alexander as a weak link in the chain and lean on him.
24	11	"The Brotherhood"	Grant Brown	Kris Mrksa	20 April 2009
The inquest into the deaths of the Wilsons commences. Trimbole learns he has cancer. As Allison's evidence inplicates everyone, a Royal Commission is convened and the Federal Narcotics Bureau is disbanded. Freeman tips off Trimbole, who flees overseas. Alexander is murdered by the cops on Freeman's payroll.
25	12	"O Lucky Man"	Tony Tilse	Peter Gawler	27 April 2009
Clark is found guilty of murder and jailed. Trimbole uses Nick Paltos to bring his massive drug shipment to Australia. Chris Flannery moves to Sydney and links up with George Freeman, killing people almost at will to prove himself.
26	13	"The Loved Ones"	Tony Tilse	Peter Gawler	4 May 2009
Terry Clark dies of a heart attack in prison. A dying Trimbole is arrested in Ireland, then flees to Spain after being released without charge. Freeman's police allies convince him that Flannery has become too dangerous to live. Paltos is arrested for trafficking but refuses to talk. Trimbole dies in a Spanish hospital.

== Cast ==
Similar to the first season, five main cast members are billed in the opening credit sequence, Roy Billing (as Robert Trimbole), Anna Hutchison (as Allison Dine), Matthew Newton (as Terry Clark), Asher Keddie (as Detective Senior Constable Liz Cruickshank) and Peter Phelps (as Detective Inspector Joe Messina). Other major cast members are billed in the episodes in which they feature heavily. Andrew McFarlane features in the opening episodes as Liberal politician and anti-drugs campaigner Donald Mackay. Peter O'Brien portrays the late Sydney underworld figure George Freeman. Kate Ritchie appears twice as Judi Kane, wife of slain standover man Les Kane and stepmother of Trisha Kane who was married to Jason Moran. Merrick Watts appears in an episode as Marty Johnstone, Clark's main supplier. Caroline Craig is the narrator, reprising her role from the first series. Other prominent actors to appear in the series include Samuel Johnston as a corrupt Federal Narcotics Agent, John Wood as corrupt NSW chief magistrate Murray Farquhar and Diane Craig as Don Mackay's wife.

Like in the original series, the Victorian Police characters, Joe Messina and Liz Cruickshank, are fictional characters based on several unnamed Victorian police officers, due to Victorian laws that do not allow the media portrayal of officers that have not been dishonorably discharged.

=== Main cast ===
Underbelly: A Tale of Two Cities features five regular cast members, with other actors who recur throughout the series.

- Matthew Newton as Terry Clark, the head of the Mr Asia drug ring.
- Roy Billing as 'Aussie Bob' Trimbole, Clark's partner in Australia.
- Anna Hutchison as Allison Dine, Clark's lover and main drug mule.
- Asher Keddie as Senior Detective Constable Liz Cruickshank, a member of the Victorian Major Crime Squad
- Peter Phelps stars as Detective Inspector Joe Messina of the Major Crime Squad, Cruickshank's boss.

=== Recurring cast ===
- Jonny Pasvolsky as Detective Inspector Dave Priest, head of the Federal task force investigating the syndicate
- Matt Passmore as Senior Detective Constable Warwick Mobbs, NSW detective in the Federal task force.
- Peter O'Brien as George Freeman, bookmaker and illegal casino operator
- Dustin Clare as Chris Flannery, the Melbourne hitman known as Mr Rent-a-Kill
- Damian de Montemas as Brian Alexander, the syndicate's legal advisor
- Wadih Dona as Dr. Nick Paltos, surgeon and drug trafficker
- Martin Dingle-Wall as Les Kane, Melbourne stand-over man
- Tim McCunn as Brian Kane, Melbourne stand-over man
- Nathan Page as Ray 'Chuck' Bennett, Melbourne armed robber
- Samuel Johnson as Jack Smith, corrupt Federal Narcotics Agent
- Paul Tassone as Detective Sergeant Dennis Kelly, corrupt NSW police detective
- Daniel Roberts as Detective Sergeant Jim Egan, a corrupt NSW detective
- Simone Kessell as Isabelle Wilson, one of Clark's drug mules and victims
- Gareth Reeves as Douglas Wilson, one of Clark's drug mules and victims
- Damon Gameau as Andy Maher, Clark's Singapore middleman.
- Katie Wall as Karen Soich, Terry's lawyer and lover
- Caroline Craig as the series narrator, reprising her role from the first series

=== Guest cast ===
- John McNeill as Lenny McPherson, Sydney stand-over man
- Jenna Lind as Maria Muhary, the mother of Clark's son
- Suzannah McDonald as Ann-Marie Presland, Bob's mistress in Sydney
- Elan Zavelsky as Alphonse Gangitano, Melbourne stand-over man
- Luke McKenzie as Mick Gatto, associate of the Kane brothers
- Teo Gebert as Laurie Prendergast, one of Bennett's crew
- Wayne Bradley as Vinnie Mikkelsen, one of Bennett's crew
- Scott Burgess as James Fredrick 'Fred' Bazley, Melbourne hitman
- Marcello Fabrizi as TV Reporter (1 episode)
- Ric Herbert as Al Grassby (1 episode), former government minister and associate of Trimbole
- Dieter Brummer as Detective Constable Trevor Hakens, a corrupt NSW detective
- Don Halbert as Barry Walker, a corrupt Melbourne detective
- Kate Ritchie as Judi Kane (2 episodes), wife of Les Kane
- John Wood as Murray Farquhar (2 episodes), corrupt NSW chief magistrate
- Merrick Watts as Marty Johnstone (1 episode), Clark's Singapore supplier
- Andrew McFarlane as Don Mackay, Trimbole and Clark's first victim
- Diane Craig as Barbara Mackay, Mackay's wife
- Renato Fabretti as Mark 'Chopper' Read (1 episode), Melbourne stand-over man and Bennett's fellow inmate
- Tony Poli as Gianfranco 'Frank' Tizzoni, Marijuana grower and a close associate of Trimbole
- Anthony Simcoe as Danny Chubb (2 episodes), Sydney drug supplier
- Brendan Donoghue as Mick Sayers (2 episodes), Sydney heroin dealer
- Paul Ireland as Tony Eustace (2 episodes), Sydney brothel owner and drug dealer
- Myles Pollard as Phil de la Salle, a Sydney homicide detective who investigates Mackay's murder
- Sam Anderson as Harry 'Pommy' Lewis (3 episodes), one of Clark's drug mules and victims
- Chris Sadrinna as Greg Ollard (2 episodes), a heroin dealer and friend of Clark
- Jake Lindesay as Wayne Robb, Allison's boyfriend and drug courier
- Ian Roberts as Barry, Freeman's bodyguard
- Ria Vandervis as Kay Reynolds, one of Clark's drug mules and friend to Allison
- Lewis Fitz-Gerald as John Aston (3 episodes)
- Peter Lamb as Johannes Muller (2 episodes), Sydney underworld figure who organised the hit on Freeman
- Josh McConville as Michael Hurley (2 episodes), would-be drug dealer and Freeman's failed assassin
- Harold Hopkins as George Joseph (2 episodes), Melbourne gun dealer and Bazley's associate
- Aaron Hammond as Tim, a Federal Narcotics Agent (2 episodes)
- Michael Sarantos as a Spanish Detective (1 episode)
- Alexander Palacio as a Spanish Nurse (2 episodes)
- Nick Lazarou as Italian Labourer [2 episodes]

== Production ==
Filming took place in both Sydney and Melbourne until March 2009. Sydney locations Richmond and Warwick Farm were used to portray Griffith in the 1970s. Along with these sites, a house in Wahroonga was used for George Freeman's house in later episodes. The scenes in Freeman's casino were shot at a hotel in Sefton. Writers Peter Gawler and Greg Haddrick have admitted that there is more nudity and sex than in the original.

== Reception ==
=== Critical reception ===
Critics praised Kate Ritchie for her performance as Judi Kane. Ninemsn's Sam Downing said he was "pleasantly surprised" by her acting. Downing expected to be thinking of Ritchie's Home and Away character Sally the whole time, but found "she was surprisingly different and really good". TV reviewer and La Trobe University media lecturer Sue Turnbull thought Ritchie managed to cast off her soap opera persona through the role. Turnbull said that Ritchie did not overplay her scenes, and the emotion on her face indicated there was "a lot more going on".

The series received generally positive reviews, but has been criticised for embellishing and dramatising the real events on which is it based. In a column for the tabloid The Sydney Daily Telegraph on 24 February 2009, author Keith Moor is highly critical of the events depicted in the show. In the article, Moor points out among other things that Trimbole and Clark never met until after Donald Mackay was murdered, that Trimbole had no role in the Great Bookie Robbery nor did he own or live on an orange orchard and that Allison Dine didn't see Clark for three days after he killed Pommy Lewis. It is also known that Brian and Les Kane did participate in the Great Bookie Robbery and were not shut out of it as suggested by the show.

=== Ratings ===
The series debuted with double episodes attracting an average of 2,501,500 viewers nationally, in the mainland capitals. The first episode with 2,584,000 viewers was the biggest audience for a non-sporting program premiere since the introduction of people meters in Australia in 2001. As of episode 3, the series has attracted an average of 2.489 million viewers per episode. The previous years highest rating broadcast was Seven's Packed to the Rafters with 1.938 million.

==== Series ratings ====
The following table's ratings and rankings are subject to change as more episodes are broadcast.

TV Season	Timeslot	Season Premiere	Season Finale	Weekly Ranking			Viewers (Millions)	Yearly Ranking
TV Season	Timeslot	Season Premiere	Season Finale	1st	2nd	>2nd	Viewers (Millions)	Yearly Ranking
2009	8:30pm Monday	9 February 2009	4 May 2009	#10	#2*	#1**	2.158	#1

*Second due to double episode premiere
**5th due to other networks grand finales and premieres

==== Weekly ratings ====
The weekly Australian metropolitan ratings are below.

Episode		Air Date	Timeslot	Viewers (millions)	Nightly Rank	Weekly Rank
1	"Aussie Bob & Kiwi Terry"	9 February 2009	8:30pm Monday	2.582	1	1
2	"Bad Habits"	9 February 2009	9:30pm Monday	2.397	2	2
3	"Brave New World"	16 February 2009	8:30pm Monday	2.476	1	1
4	"Business as Usual"	23 February 2009	8:30pm Monday	2.334	1	1
5	"A Tale of Two Hitmen"	2 March 2009	8:30pm Monday	2.233	1	1
6	"Stranded"	9 March 2009	8:30pm Monday	2.267	1	1
7	"A Nice Little Earner"	16 March 2009	8:30pm Monday	2.174	1	1
8	"Diamonds"	23 March 2009	8:30pm Monday	2.069	1	1
9	"Judas Kiss"	30 March 2009	8:30pm Monday	2.126	1	1
10	"The Reckoning"	20 April 2009	8:30pm Monday	1.826	1	1
11	"The Brotherhood"	20 April 2009	9:30pm Monday	1.803	2	2
12	"O Lucky Man"	27 April 2009	8:30pm Monday	1.705	4	5
13	"The Loved Ones"	4 May 2009	8:30pm Monday	2.078	1	1
Series average				2.159	#1	#1

== Sequel ==
The third series, titled Underbelly: The Golden Mile, began airing in 2010. It is a sequel to the second series and a prequel to the first.

Peter Andrikidis, director of the first series, has said that writers are penning a third edition of the crime drama to link the two series. "It's being written at the moment and I think it takes it up to the first series. So it's the end of this series and up to 1995, that is the plan. I'd say it'd have something to do with the people that were set up in series one. But they're still developing that, it's just what they can get the rights on," Andrikidis said.

In a further press release on 11 June 2009, Nine Network has disclosed the plot will pick up from where A Tale of Two Cities ended in 1987: centring on the worsening systematic corruption within the NSW Police and associated illicit drug, prostitution, underground gambling, night club activities at Kings Cross in the late 1980s. This entrenched culture of corruption and entanglement with organised crime only ended in the mid 1990s with the Wood Royal Commission which "cleaned out the Black Empire within the NSW Police".

== See also ==
- List of Australian television series
- 2009 in Australian television
