= Big Night (disambiguation) =

Big Night may refer to:

- Big Night, a courtship event among reptiles and amphibians
- Big Night, a 1996 American comedy-drama film directed by Campbell Scott and Stanley Tucci
- Big Night!, Filipino film
- Big Night (album), a 2014 album by British-Australian singer-songwriter Peter Andre
- "Big Night", a song by Big Time Rush from the 2010 album BTR

See also

- The Big Night (disambiguation)
- The Big Night In, a 2020 telethon in the United Kingdom
- The Big Night In with John Foreman, Australian variety show
