= The Big Night =

The Big Night may refer to:

- The Big Night (1951 film), a film directed by Joseph Losey
- Bad Girls Don't Cry, a 1959 film directed by Mauro Bolognini
- The Big Night (1960 film), a film directed by Sidney Salkow
- The Big Night (1976 film), a film directed by Francis Reusser

== See also ==
- Big Night (disambiguation)
- The Big Night In, a 2020 telethon in the United Kingdom
- The Big Night In with John Foreman, Australian variety show
