= Robert Trimbole =

Australian businessman and drug baron (1931–1987)

- Born: Bruno Robert Trimbole; 19 March 1931; Griffith, New South Wales, Australia
- Died: 12 May 1987 (aged 56); Alicante, Valencian Community, Spain
- Resting place: Pine Grove Memorial Park
- Other names: Michael Hanbury "Aussie Bob"
- Occupations: Businessman, mechanic, mobster
- Years active: 1952−1981
- Spouses: Joan Quested (m. 1953; died 1987) Nicola Payne (m. 1979; died 1987)
- Children: 4
- Allegiance: Honoured Society; Irish Mob

Bruno Robert Trimbole (/trɪmboʊli/) (19 March 1931 – 12 May 1987) was an Australian businessman, drug baron and organised crime figure whose alleged involvement in drug trafficking in Griffith, New South Wales, resulted in a royal commission, a coroner's inquest and an international chase by the Australian government seeking his apprehension after he fled to Europe.

== Early life ==
Robert Trimbole was born on 19 March 1931 to Italian parents who migrated to Australia from the southern Italian region of Calabria. In 1952 he married Joan Quested in Sydney, then moved into his parents' house in Griffith, New South Wales. After several months, Trimbole and his wife moved into their own rented property and raised their four children.

Trimbole rented a nearby garage and operated as a mechanic, also said to have undertaken his own panel beating and spray painting within the business before declaring himself bankrupt in 1968 with debts of A$11,000.

== Godfather ==
After his bankruptcy, Trimbole made a living repairing pinball machines. In 1972 he opened a restaurant called The Texan Tavern and a butcher shop named The Texan Butchery. He sold both businesses to an associate, Giuseppe Sergi, in 1973. By this stage, Trimbole's wealth had grown substantially and he was able to discharge his earlier bankruptcy.

Through his legitimate businesses, Trimbole had built an empire valued at over A$2 million and, through local confusion and jealousy, had also earned himself a reputation as a major drug baron. Many locals referred to Trimbole's house as the "Grass Castle", a reference to his rise to power in the illegal marijuana trade. Trimbole invested in many investment items and businesses, including farms, cars, speedboats, several clothing stores, a liquor store and a wholesale wine business. He later added a trucking company and a supermarket. Trimbole also purchased land to further his orange and grape growing capacity. He seemed to go about his business activities virtually unchallenged.

Trimbole soon became the principal of the Australian plant-based cultivation trade based in New South Wales and earned the nickname "the Godfather", a reference to his leadership qualities and Italian background. He also went by the nickname "Aussie Bob", a term allegedly given to him by his New Zealand associates, but was in fact given to him as a young man due to his strong Australian accent amongst his Italian brothers, sisters, community friends and associates.

Trimbole ran the organisation of pickers on marijuana farms near Balranald, trafficking the crop across the state border down Melbourne. 'Big Bill' Griffith had not been able to retain Griffith during the 1950s and maintained a cordial relationship as long as both did not cross into the other's 'turf', Big Bill had Balranald and there was a line on the road near Hay to denote the blood boundary. Big Bill was though the money lender, interesting Big Bill lent to everybody and funded Al Grassby Minister for Immigration to the tune of $50,000 to make a problem go away carried by Big Bill's grandson Steven. Neutral turf was always the race track where all borders abstained while deals were done; Trimbole and Big Bill preferred Moonee Valley racetrack. Fifty thousand dollars was known as a 'brick', because it was so heavy with no $50 notes. At all pickings there were always three police escort vehicles, and school buses had windows blacked out, a nights picking in the seventies for a child was $100 cash, it generated one semitrailer of 'dope', the country word for city people who smoke it.

== Disappearance of Donald Mackay ==
Donald Bruce Mackay was a local politician and anti-drugs campaigner. He was born and raised in Griffith, New South Wales, and operated his family's furniture business. Described as being very community minded, Mackay was an Australian Liberal Party candidate from 1973 to 1976, but failed to win a seat in parliament.

Concerned about the growing drug trade in his local area, and learning of a large crop of marijuana in nearby Coleambally, New South Wales, Mackay told Sydney police of the information he had obtained regarding the crop, which resulted in several arrests, and four men of Italian descent being convicted on Mackay's information.

At the trial of the men arrested, Mackay's name was read out during evidence, identifying him as the whistleblower. On 12 July 1977, an attempt was made by an unidentified man to lure Mackay to Jerilderie. The caller claimed to want to make a large order of furniture from Mackay's family business. Mackay, busy attending a funeral at the time of the planned meeting with other matters, sent an employee, who travelled to Jerilderie to find nobody about.

On 15 July 1977, Mackay disappeared from the Griffith Hotel car park after having drinks with friends. His body has never been found. At the scene of his disappearance, his locked van had bloodstains on the door, wheel rim, mudguard and tyre and his car keys and three spent .22 casings were found. Trimbole is believed to have arranged the contract-style killing of Mackay.

== Woodward Royal Commission ==
The disappearance of Mackay prompted a royal commission into the Griffith drug trade, known as the Woodward Royal Commission after its sole commissioner, the Honorable Philip Morgan Woodward.

After several months, the Commission reduced the suspect list to six people including:

- Robert Trimbole
- James Frederick Bazley
- George Joseph
- Gianfranco Tizzone
- and two known associates of Trimbole.

Justice Woodward says in the official transcript, "I have named Trimbole as being associated with the production of marijuana in Griffith as well as being the director of an operation in Euston. He is, if not the 'top man' in relation to the production of marijuana in the Griffith area, then one of them and closely associated with Antonio Sergi in the same enterprise."

Woodward found regarding the disappearance of Mackay that "the disposal of Mackay was the result of an organised plan. He was disposed of by the organisation which I find existed in Griffith. I am satisfied that the appointment to meet Mackay at Jerilderie was part of a plan to ambush and dispose of him." A year later the New South Wales Supreme Court officially declared Donald Mackay as "presumed deceased".

No further action was taken. Trimbole and his associates were free to return to business as usual.

== Coroner's inquest ==
Seven years after the Woodward Royal Commission, political and media pressure called for an inquest into Mackay's death, which was eventually held before Coroner Bruce Brown.

The inquest also heard evidence showing that lights in the car park had been broken before the meeting time set with Mackay, indicating a premeditated act to ambush him, and that Mackay feared for his life after learning that the crop leading to the convictions of the four men had an estimated street value of more than A$25 million.

Evidence was also submitted regarding a man by the name of Patrick Joseph Keenan who made a statement to police that he had walked into a shed in the Griffth area and found Antonio Sergi inside with several women packing large quantities of marijuana into plastic bags.

Forensic evidence supported the crown's case, including ballistic evidence showing that the three .22 cases found at the scene had been fired from the same weapon, a French "Unique" brand hand gun. Blood and hair samples were also recovered from the scene and matched to Mackay.

The coroner Brown said, "The evidence has now reached the point where I am of the opinion that a prima facie case of murder, in that each was an accessory before or after the fact, has been established against two known persons whose identity I must not publicly reveal in accordance with the prohibition under section 19 of the Coroners Act."

== Escape and capture ==
On 5 May 1981, police recorded a conversation between Trimbole and an associate, Dr Nick Paltos, about his pending arrest for conspiracy to murder Mackay. Trimbole fled to the United States, then to France and finally to Ireland, avoiding customs checks by changing his date of birth on a departure card.

A month later, he was arrested in Ireland and held in custody awaiting extradition but, aided by a battery of high-priced lawyers, managed to avoid extradition after the Irish government refused to extradite him to Australia and he was released. The Australian government appealed against the decision of the Irish court, but Trimbole regained his freedom.

Australian Federal Police intercepted phone conversations of Paltos discussing the failed extradition attempt of Trimbole and made mention of the large amounts of money that Trimbole had spent on his defence, explaining that efforts to extradite Trimbole failed largely due to the efforts of Irish constitutional lawyer Patrick MacEntee, who had become famous for defending IRA members.

Trimbole escaped from Ireland to Spain, where he died in a Spanish hospital on 12 May 1987, at the age of 56. His body was returned to Australia and his funeral was held in Sydney, where mourners and journalists brawled and made news headlines around the country on the evening news. He was buried at Pine Grove Memorial Park in Minchinbury, New South Wales on 1 June 1987.

== Underbelly: A Tale Of Two Cities ==
Trimbole is a central character in the drama series Underbelly: A Tale of Two Cities, a mini-series on the Nine Network. He is portrayed by actor Roy Billing.
