= Use Me =

Use Me may refer to:

- "Use Me" (Bill Withers song), 1972 song by Bill Withers
- "Use Me" a 1994 gospel song on that appears on God Is Able (Ron Kenoly album)
- "Use Me" a 2002 song by Garbage that was the B-side for some editions of their "Cherry Lips" single
- "Use Me" (Kid Courageous song), 2005 song by Kid Courageous
- "Use Me" (Hinder song), 2008 song by Hinder
- Use Me (David Bromberg album), a 2011 album by David Bromberg
- "Use Me", a song by Future on his album Hndrxx (2017)
- Use Me (Pvris album), a 2020 album by Pvris
- "Use Me" (Dallas Smith song), 2023 song by Dallas Smith
- "Use Me" (Zach Top song), a 2024 song by Zach Top
