= Murray Farquhar =

Australian judge and criminal (1918-1993)

Murray Farquhar OBE (7 July 1918 – 3 December 1993) was an Australian jurist. He was the Chief Stipendiary Magistrate of New South Wales between 1971 and 1977. Farquhar was born in Broken Hill, New South Wales. He attended Broken Hill High School and served in the Australian Army in the Second World War. After his military service, he studied law, practiced as a solicitor, and was appointed a magistrate in 1962. He was appointed Chief Stipendiary Magistrate in 1971.

He was appointed an Officer of the Order of the British Empire (Military Division) in January 1967.

A Royal Commission conducted by Sir Laurence Street into the alleged involvement of both Farquhar and Premier of New South Wales Neville Wran in the acquittal of former head of the Australian Rugby League Kevin Humphreys, who was on fraud charges, resulted in Farquhar in March 1985 being sentenced to four years' gaol for conspiracy to pervert the course of justice. During his trial, it became clear that Farquhar had deep roots in the criminal community, including connections to George Freeman and Nick Paltos. Much of the investigative work in the Farquhar case was due to the efforts of the Australian Broadcasting Corporation's Four Corners program and The Sun-Herald newspaper.

In March 1991, Farquhar was acquitted of receiving stolen paintings. He had a fatal heart attack on 3 December 1993 while on trial for conspiracy to obtain stolen passports.

== Popular culture ==
Murray Farquhar was played by John Clayton in the docudrama The Day of the Roses and by John Wood in the drama series Underbelly: A Tale of Two Cities.
