= Terry Clark (drug smuggler) =

Drug syndicate leader from New Zealand

- Mugshot of Terry Clark (1979)
- Born: Terrance John Clark; 1944; Gisborne, New Zealand
- Died: 1983 (aged 38–39); Isle of Wight, England
- Other name: Mr Big
- Years active: 1970s–1979
- Spouse(s): Sarah Clark (divorced); Norma Fleet (died 1975); Maria Muhary
- Children: 4
- Status: Deceased
- Allegiance: Mr Asia's drug cartel
- Conviction: Contract killing
- Penalty: Life imprisonment
- Accomplices: Robert Trimbole; Marty Johnstone; James 'Diamond Jim' Shepherd

Details
- Imprisoned at: HM Prison Parkhurst

Terrance John Clark (12 November 1944 – 12 August 1983), also known by the aliases Terry Sinclair, Alexander James Sinclair, Tony Bennetti, the Australian Jackal and Mr Big, was the head of the Mr Asia drug syndicate, which imported heroin into New Zealand, Australia and the United Kingdom in the 1970s. Clark was the second head man of the syndicate and became the lead after plotting the murder of Marty Johnstone, the man who became known as Mr Asia.

== Career ==
Born in Gisborne, New Zealand, Clark began his criminal career through petty crimes and was well known to police as a local thug. His career expanded in the mid-1970s after meeting Marty Johnstone, who at this stage was doing financially well importing cannabis "buddha sticks" into New Zealand from Southeast Asia.

Clark and Johnstone, wanting to expand their market and money, started importing high quality white heroin into New Zealand and Australia. This was about the time Clark moved to Australia to head the operation there. Their Asian partner based in Singapore was Choo Cheng Kui, better known as "Chinese Jack", or Jack Choo.

Clark was a ruthless controller of his operations and killed a number of associates, including Gregory Ollard, a Mr Asia drug supplier and heroin addict. He lured Ollard to Ku-ring-gai Chase National Park in the northern suburbs of Sydney, where he killed, mutilated and buried him. After killing him, he drove to the home of Ollard's girlfriend in Avalon and abducted her. He then drove her to the Blue Mountains where he killed her.

== Women ==
Clark was known for his womanising, and had a reputation for extreme violence. He met his first wife Sally in his early years and she was mother to his first three children. After his divorce from Sally, Clark entered into a relationship with heroin addict Norma Fleet, whom he married in Wi Tako Prison. Norma later died in mysterious circumstances.

It was at this time he met his third wife, Maria Muhary, with whom he fathered his fourth child. While in Australia, Clark became involved with Allison Raewyn Dine, a New Zealand kindergarten teacher from Rotorua, who moved to Australia and met Clark. Dine became Clark's chief heroin courier and recruiter of other couriers, predominantly other young women. Later at Clark's trial in the UK, Dine testified against Clark and was granted immunity from prosecution. After the trial, Dine reportedly went into a witness protection programme and still lives in the UK under an assumed name.

After Dine, Clark became involved with Karen Mary Marie Soich, a New Zealand solicitor to whom he proposed marriage while serving at HM Prison Parkhurst. Soich later told the New Zealand Commission that she had put the proposal to marry Clark in abeyance. Clark was arrested while in bed with Soich.

== Murder trial and death ==
In October 1979, Clark had Marty Johnstone (Mr Asia) lured to Britain on the pretext of a drug deal to take place in Scotland. Johnstone was murdered by his longtime friend Andy Maher under the orders of Clark. His handless body was dumped in Eccleston Delph, Lancashire, mutilated in a hasty but failed attempt to foil identification by the police. Maher cut off his hands and battered Johnstone's face, hoping to prevent dental identification.

Initially the police were unable to identify the victim, and published a death mask of Johnstone in several newspapers to assist identification. In the end Johnstone was identified by his neck medallion that was still on the corpse. Only one of Johnstone's hands was recovered by police.

Clark was convicted of the contract murder and sentenced to life imprisonment. His trial at the time was the most heavily guarded in British history.

Clark died in 1983 at HM Prison Parkhurst on the Isle of Wight. The official cause of death given was heart attack.

== In fiction ==
Clark was played by Philip Quast in the episode "All Good Friends" in the 1992 British ITV series Crime Story, dealing with the killing of Marty Johnstone.

Clark is one of the main characters in the 2009 Nine Network television series Underbelly: A Tale of Two Cities. The character was played by Matthew Newton.

Clark was a key character in the 2011 New Zealand television series Underbelly NZ: Land Of The Long Green Cloud. This series depicts events prior to and concurrent with Underbelly: A Tale of Two Cities. In this NZ series, Clark was played by Erroll Shand.
