= Who We Are Now =

- Theatrical release poster
- Directed by: Matthew Newton
- Screenplay by: Matthew Newton
- Produced by: Kate Ballen; Matthew Newton; Varun Monga; Ray Bouderau; Julianne Nicholson
- Starring: Julianne Nicholson; Emma Roberts; Zachary Quinto; Jimmy Smits; Jess Weixler; Lea Thompson; Jason Biggs; Gloria Reuben
- Cinematography: Dagmar Weaver-Madsen
- Edited by: Betsy Kagen
- Production companies: Existent Films; Living the Dream Films; Radiant Films International; Oriah Entertainment
- Distributed by: FilmRise
- Release dates: September 9, 2017 (TIFF); May 25, 2018 (United States)
- Running time: 99 minutes
- Country: United States
- Language: English
- Box office: $19,128

Who We Are Now is a 2017 American drama film directed and written by Matthew Newton, starring Julianne Nicholson, Zachary Quinto, Jess Weixler, Jason Biggs, Lea Thompson, Jimmy Smits, and Emma Roberts.

The film screened in the Special Presentations section at the 2017 Toronto International Film Festival, and received a limited theatrical release in the United States on May 25, 2018. Who We Are Now received critical acclaim, who lauded Newton's direction and the performances of the cast, especially Nicholson.

== Premise ==
One year after being released from prison for manslaughter, a young woman finds herself represented by a bright, young public defense lawyer in an attempt to get custody of her son back.

== Cast ==
- Julianne Nicholson as Beth (the ex-convict)
- Emma Roberts as Jess (the idealistic young attorney)
- Zachary Quinto as Peter
- Jimmy Smits as Carl
- Jess Weixler as Gabby
- Lea Thompson as Alana
- Jason Biggs as Vince
- Gloria Reuben as Rebecca
- E.J. Ann as Lu Lin
- Ray Bouderau as Ray in the Salon
- Carly Brooke as Felicity
- Myrna Cabello as Guard
- Katherine Dickson as Actress
- Katie Eichler as Kelly
- Bruce Faulk as Bruce
- Mark C. Fullhardt as Lawyer
- Olli Haaskivi as Kevin
- Samantha Hill as Monica
- Sarah Ito as Nail Salon Patron
- Jo Mei as Mina
- Oscar Pavlo as Man At The Bar
- Torun Esmaeili as Girl At The Bar
- Camila Perez as Maria
- Alexa Petito as School Girl Running Down The Hall / Extra
- Luke Rosen as George
- Sarah Schenkkan as Lisa
- Isreal McKinney Scott as Isreal (Father in Law Firm)
- Shayan Shojaee as Prosecutor
- Logan Smith as Alec
- Grant Shaud as Judge
- Stephanie March as Emma

== Reception ==
The review aggregator Rotten Tomatoes reported an approval rating of 96%, with an average score of 7.9/10, based on 23 reviews. Metacritic, which uses a weighted average, assigned the film a score of 83 out of 100 based on reviews from 7 critics, indicating "universal acclaim".
