= Matthew Newton =

Australian actor, writer, and director (born 1977)

- Born: Matthew Joseph Newton; 22 January 1977 (age 49); Melbourne, Victoria, Australia
- Education: Xavier College; National Institute of Dramatic Art (BFA)
- Occupations: Actor; radio host; writer; director
- Years active: 1987–present
- Notable work: Underbelly: A Tale of Two Cities
- Spouse: Catherine Schneiderman
- Parents: Bert Newton (father); Patti Newton (mother)
- Relatives: Eric Schneiderman (father-in-law)

Matthew Joseph Newton (born 22 January 1977) is an Australian actor, writer, and director, and son of Australian TV personalities Bert and Patti Newton. He made his motion picture debut in 1993 in the Australian film Body Melt. His career was derailed by several widely-publicised charges of assault against female partners and others in the 2000s and 2010s, after which he relocated to the United States. He later resumed directing films and currently lives in Austin, Texas with his wife Catherine Schneiderman, daughter of American politician Eric Schneiderman.

== Career ==
Newton has performed in Australia and abroad on stage, television and movies. In 1988, he starred in Sugar and Spice, a children's television series. In 1992, he starred in Late For School, a drama series that aired briefly on Channel Ten. In 1993 he made his film debut in Body Melt. In 2000, he starred in My Mother Frank and alongside Pia Miranda in the film adaptation of the teen novel Looking for Alibrandi. In 2001 he appeared in the Australian/American science fiction show Farscape as the character Jothee, and as the vampire Armand in Queen of the Damned (in 2002).

In 2005, Newton starred in The Surgeon, which aired on Channel Ten.

In 2006, he appeared in the first and second seasons of improvisation comedy show Thank God You're Here. Newton also starred in a TV series for TV1 called Stupid, Stupid Man set in the office of a fictional men's magazine called COQ where he plays Nick Driscoll, the features writer.

In 2006, Newton appeared on the New Year's Eve 2006 episode of The Big Night In with John Foreman on Network Ten in which he engaged in simulated sex acts and other suggestive activity. The Daily Telegraph reported his antics and the station received criticism from outraged viewers who complained the show was "sub-standard coverage" and "the worst ever".

On 15 January 2007, Newton was fired from his new role as a radio host at Nova 96.9. He had recently been signed to co-host The Matt and Boothy Show with comedian Akmal Saleh in the prime time drive shift on Fridays. The Daily Telegraph confirmed that Newton announced the radio station had released him from his contract, reportedly worth up to $200,000 a year. The station suspended his involvement in the broadcasts, which were due to begin on 15 January, after allegations were made public that he had assaulted actress Brooke Satchwell, his then-girlfriend. Television actress Kate Ritchie replaced him at Nova.

In 2008, he was reportedly close to being cast for a role as a gangster in the first season of Underbelly, but did not get the role. He went on to appear in Underbelly: A Tale of Two Cities as protagonist Terry Clark.

Newton wrote, directed and starred in the feature Three Blind Mice, which made its international premiere at the Toronto International Film Festival and won the Critics Prize at the 2008 London Film Festival.

Newton performed "The Christmas Song" at the Carols by Candlelight Christmas Eve family event at the Sidney Myer Music Bowl in 2009.

In 2010, Newton was announced as the host of the Australian version of The X Factor on the Seven Network. However, in August 2010 following two domestic violence incidents involving girlfriend Rachael Taylor at a hotel in Rome, Newton had to quit The X Factor due to 'medical advice'.

In 2011, Newton appeared in Face to Face, an independent Australian film directed by Michael Rymer. Newton also appeared in The Lie (directed by Joshua Leonard) in 2011.

In November 2013, Newton directed and starred in an off-Broadway production of Hamlet in New York City.

Since 2016, Newton has produced, directed and starred in three films: From Nowhere, Who We Are Now and Ava.

== Personal life, controversies and assault charges ==
=== 2006–2009 ===
In 2006, Newton split with partner, actress Brooke Satchwell. Newton was arrested on 16 October and charged with intimidation and assault occasioning actual bodily harm over incidents alleged to have occurred on 13 September and 6 October. He denied the charges.

Newton was originally charged with four offences, but on 21 May 2007 a court heard he would plead guilty to one count of common assault – with police agreeing to drop counts of assault occasioning actual bodily harm and stalking and intimidating Satchwell, intending to cause her to fear physical or mental harm. On 12 June, Newton appeared in court and pleaded guilty to the one count of common assault and was put on a 12-month good behaviour bond. Magistrate Paul Cloran, who recorded the conviction against Newton, acknowledged that although the actor received some character references from friends and family he felt compelled to record a conviction.

In July 2007, Newton had his conviction overturned based on medical grounds. Solicitor Chris Murphy tendered a letter from Dr Robert Hampshire, Newton's psychiatrist, which outlined his depressive illness and stated he was unlikely to reoffend. Judge Joseph Moore said, "It does not in any way lead the court to give special consideration to his case because he is a person of high profile", referring to Newton's celebrity status; and, "The way in which he has been given particular media attention has acted as a considerable measure of punishment."

In November 2009, Newton's hotel room in Kings Cross, Sydney, was trashed after the GQ Men's Award Night. According to media reports, the damage to the room was over $9,000. The room was booked in the name of his then girlfriend, actress Rachael Taylor and he departed the next day without checking out. New South Wales Police investigated the matter but no charges were laid.

=== 2010–2012 ===
In August 2010, Taylor took out an Apprehended Violence Order (AVO) against Newton. This followed two domestic violence incidents at a hotel in Rome where Newton allegedly "punched Taylor in the face before being sedated by ambulance officers", leading to her suffering a concussion and a sprained jaw. The media also reported his heavy use of alcohol, cocaine, marijuana, and methamphetamine at this time.

In February 2011, Newton was charged with breaching the terms of his AVO. He was released on bail and ordered to appear in court in March 2011.

It is alleged that Newton assaulted a 66-year-old taxi driver twice in the Sydney suburb of Crows Nest on 4 December 2011. He was charged with common assault and appeared in court in January 2012. The matter was originally stood over to April 2012. The matter was then stood over for a further three months as Newton was facing separate charges in the United States (see below).

In April 2012, Newton was arrested twice in Miami, Florida. In the first incident, on 7 April, he was charged with trespassing and resisting officers. In a second incident on 17 April, Newton was charged with battery and resisting arrest after he attacked a hotel receptionist. His lawyer tweeted that people with bipolar disorder need patience and support, and said that Newton is continuing treatment.

On 14 November 2012, both matters were dismissed, conditional upon Newton completing 50 hours of community service, writing a letter of apology to the hotel clerk, Ariel Bory Vargas, paying $11,500 (US) restitution to Vargas and staying away from both him and Mr. Moe's, the bar where he was accused of trespassing.

=== 2016 to present ===
Newton moved to the United States in the 2010s, settling in New York City. In 2016, he became engaged to Catherine Schneiderman, daughter of Eric Schneiderman. They married in 2017.

In August 2018, Jessica Chastain was criticised for choosing to work with Newton on the film, Ava. Chastain is a co-producer and Newton was selected as writer and director. Critics noted that appointing Newton for the role contrasted with Chastain's participation in the Time's Up campaign. Newton later stepped down as director.

He said in a statement:

Yesterday I notified Jessica Chastain and the other producers on the film ‘Eve’ that I will be stepping down as director. Since the announcement of this film, the responses, which are powerful and important, have not fallen on deaf ears.

Over the past eight years I have been working extensively with health care professionals to help me overcome my addiction and mental health illness. For the past six years I have lived a quiet and sober life. All I can do now is try to be a living amends and hopefully contribute to the positive change occurring in our industry.

== Filmography ==
=== Films ===
Year	Title	Role	Notes
1993	Body Melt	Bronto	
2000	My Mother Frank	David Kennedy	
2000	Looking for Alibrandi	John Barton	
2002	Blurred	Mason the Chauffeur	
2002	Queen of the Damned	Armand	
2005	The Great Raid	2nd American POW	
2006	The Bet	Will	
2007	La même nuit	Louie	Short film; Producer
2008	Three Blind Mice	Harry McCabe	Director and Writer
2008	Bitter & Twisted	Matt Salt	
2008	Ascension	Luke	Short film
2011	Face to Face	Jack Manning	
2011	The Lie	Steve	
2014	The Sideways Light	Aidan	
2016	Wasn't Afraid to Die	Russian arms dealer	
2016	From Nowhere		Director, Producer and Writer
2017	Who We Are Now		Director, writer
2020	Ava		Writer

=== Television ===
Year	Title	Role	Notes
1987-1991	The Flying Doctors	Wombat / Simon Maguire	2 episodes
1989	Sugar and Spice	Freddo	2 episodes
1992	Late for School	Dennis Price	13 episodes
1995	Snowy River: The McGregor Saga	Private Horsefall	Season 3, Episode 13
1998	Good Guys, Bad Guys	Casper Moody	Season 2, Episode 7
1999	Chuck Finn	Dr. Finlay / Steven Stevens	Season 1, Episode 24
2000	Grass Roots	Derek Garner	8 episodes
2000	Water Rats	Josh Rogers	Season 5, Episode 2
2000	The Lost World	Gawain	Season 1, Episode 14
2001	Changi	David Collins	6 episodes
2001	Farscape	Ka Jothee	6 episodes
2005	The Surgeon	Dr. Nick Steele	8 episodes
2005-2008	All Saints	Isaac Talbot / Derek Cook	2 episodes
2006-2008	Stupid Stupid Man	Nick Driscoll	16 episodes
2008	The Strip	Gregor Foxx	Season 1, Episode 10
2009	Underbelly: A Tale of Two Cities	Terry 'Mr Asia' Clark	13 episodes
