= Kevin Wheatley =

Australian Victoria Cross recipient

Kevin Arthur Wheatley VC MG
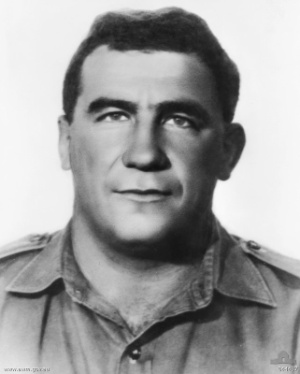
- Born: 13 March 1937; Surry Hills, New South Wales, Australia
- Died: 13 November 1965 (aged 28); Trà Bồng, Quảng Ngãi Province, South Vietnam
- Burial place: Pine Grove Memorial Park
- Military career
- Allegiance: Australia
- Branch: Australian Army
- Service years: 1956–1965
- Rank: Warrant Officer Class II
- Nickname: "Dasher"
- Units: Royal Australian Regiment; Australian Army Training Team Vietnam
- Conflicts: Malayan Emergency; Vietnam War
- Awards: Victoria Cross; Medal for Gallantry; Silver Star (United States); Knight of the National Order of Vietnam; Military Merit Medal (Vietnam); Cross of Gallantry (Vietnam)

Kevin Arthur "Dasher" Wheatley, VC, MG (13 March 1937 – 13 November 1965) was an Australian soldier and a recipient of the Victoria Cross, the highest award for gallantry in the face of the enemy that can be awarded to British and Commonwealth forces. Wheatley was one of four Australians to receive the award for actions during the Vietnam War.

== Early years ==
Wheatley was born in the Sydney suburb of Surry Hills on 13 March 1937, the third child of Raymond and Ivy (née Newman) Wheatley, both natives of Sydney. He was educated at Maroubra Junction Junior Technical School. Upon completing his schooling, Wheatley worked as a labourer in Sydney. On 20 July 1954, aged 17, he married Edna Davis; together they had four children. He was a keen rugby player, and he earned the nickname of "Dasher" on the field.

== Military service ==
On 12 June 1956, at the age of 19, Wheatley enlisted in the Australian Army and after completing basic training he was allocated to the Royal Australian Infantry Corps and posted to the 4th Battalion, Royal Australian Regiment. Early the following year, he was posted to the 3rd Battalion, Royal Australian Regiment and he subsequently served a tour of Malaya between late 1957 and early 1959, during the Malayan Emergency. After his return to Australia, Wheatley served a posting with the 2nd Battalion, Royal Australian Regiment in 1959–61 and then the 1st Battalion, Royal Australian Regiment from 1961 to 1965. He was promoted twice in 1964, firstly to sergeant and then warrant officer. In early 1965, he was posted to the Australian Army Training Team Vietnam and deployed to South Vietnam.

Early in his tour he was involved in an action with Army of the Republic of Vietnam (ARVN) regular troops in Quảng Trị Province. During the fighting, a child ran across the battlefield. Seeing the danger, Wheatley ran after the girl through the cross fire and brought her back to safety, using his own body to shield her. Later, in August 1965, during an attack on a Viet Cong (VC) held village Wheatley was recommended for an award by a US infantry advisor after he single-handedly exploited the position, carrying the attack up a steep slope as the VC forces withdrew. The recommendation was not acted upon at the time, however, and in September Wheatley was transferred to another team, known as the "A Team", who were part of the 5th Special Forces Group. Under the command of Captain Felix Fazekas, the team operated around the village of Tra Bong.

Tra Bong was very isolated, with only a single road providing access. On 13 November, after this road had been captured by the VC, a group of Australian advisors, including Wheatley, accompanied a company from the Civil Irregular Defence Group (CIDG) on a "search and destroy mission". Wheatley was assigned to one of the platoons with a fellow warrant officer, Ron Swanton. As the platoon advanced through rice paddies in the vicinity of Binh Hoa, they came under heavy fire from a larger VC force. In the ensuing fighting, Swanton was mortally wounded. As the situation grew more intense, Wheatley requested support from Fazekas and a medical evacuation for Swanton. When his platoon began to scatter, Wheatley carried the wounded Swanton to a safer area as Fazekas moved his troops to support. As the VC closed around his position, Wheatley insisted on staying with Swanton even though he was urged to leave by medical personnel. Wheatley was subsequently killed while defending his comrade.

== Victoria Cross citation ==
Wheatley was 28 years old, and a warrant officer in the Australian Army Training Team when he performed the deed for which he was later awarded the VC. The citation in the London Gazette, which announced Wheatley's award on 15 December 1966 reads:

The Queen has been graciously pleased on advice of Her Majesty's Australian Ministers to approve the Posthumous award of the VICTORIA CROSS to:

29890 Warrant Officer Class II Kevin Arthur Wheatley, Australian Army; Training Team Vietnam.

Warrant Officer Wheatley enlisted in the Australian Regular Army in 1956. He served in Malaya with 3rd Battalion, The Royal Australian Regiment from 1957 to 1959 and then with 2nd and 1st Battalions of the Regiment until 1965 when he was posted to the Australian Army Training Team Vietnam.

His posting in this area has been distinguished by meritorious and gallant service.

On 13 November 1965 at approximately 13:00 hours, a Vietnamese Civil Irregular Defence Group company commenced a search and destroy operation in the Tra Bong valley, 15 kilometres (9.3 mi) east of Tra Bong Special Forces camp in Quang Ngai Province. Accompanying the force were Captain F. Fazekas, senior Australian Advisor, with the centre platoon, and Warrant Officers K. A. Wheatley and R. J. Swanton with the right hand platoon. At about 1340 hours, Warrant Officer Wheatley reported contact with Viet Cong elements. The Viet Cong resistance increased in strength until finally Warrant Officer Wheatley asked for assistance. Captain Fazekas immediately organised the centre platoon to help and personally led and fought towards the action area. While moving towards this area he received another radio message from Warrant Officer Wheatley to say that Warrant Officer Swanton had been hit in the chest, and requested an air strike and an aircraft, for the evacuation of casualties. At about this time the right platoon broke in the face of heavy Viet Cong fire and began to scatter. Although told by the Civil Irregular Defence Group medical assistant that Warrant Officer Swanton was dying, Warrant Officer Wheatley refused to abandon him. He discarded his radio to enable him to half drag, half carry Warrant Officer Swanton, under heavy machine-gun and automatic rifle fire, out of the open rice paddies into the comparative safety of a wooded area, some 200 metres away. He was assisted by a Civil Irregular Defence Group member, Private Dinh Do who, when the Viet Cong were only some ten metres away, urged him to leave his dying comrade. Again he refused, and was seen to pull the pins from two grenades and calmly awaited the Viet Cong, holding one grenade in each hand. Shortly afterwards, two grenade explosions were heard, followed by several bursts of small arms fire.

The two bodies were found at first light next morning after the fighting had ceased, with Warrant Officer Wheatley lying beside Warrant Officer Swanton. Both had died of gunshot wounds.

Warrant Officer Wheatley displayed magnificent courage in the face of an overwhelming Viet Cong force which was later estimated at more than a company. He had the clear choice of abandoning a wounded comrade and saving himself by escaping through the dense timber or of staying with Warrant Officer Swanton and thereby facing certain death. He deliberately chose the latter course. His acts of heroism, determination and unflinching loyalty in the face of the enemy will always stand as examples of the true meaning of valour.

Wheatley's grave at Pine Grove Memorial Park

For his leadership of the attack on the Viet Cong-held village in August 1965, Wheatley was nominated for the US Silver Star, but the award was delayed due to Australian policies regarding the acceptance of foreign awards. The award was finally approved and presented to his son, George, in December 2021. Additionally, the South Vietnamese awarded Wheatley the Knight of the National Order of Vietnam, the Military Merit Medal and the Cross of Gallantry with Palm. Wheatley's award was one of four Victoria Crosses bestowed upon members of the AATTV and was the first awarded to an Australian during the Vietnam War.

== Honours ==
Wheatley was buried at Pine Grove Memorial Park in the Western Sydney suburb of Minchinbury. His Victoria Cross is on display at the Australian War Memorial in Canberra, having been donated in 1993.

The stadium in the 1st Australian Support Compound at Vũng Tàu, South Vietnam was named in his honour.

On 2 September 2024, he was posthumously awarded the Medal for Gallantry for "acts of gallantry in action in hazardous circumstances on 28 May and 18 August 1965 as an advisor and assistant advisor to the Army of the Republic of Vietnam."
