= Eccleston Quarry =

Flooded quarry used as a recreational dive site

Coordinates: 53.6291°N 2.7291°W

Eccleston Quarry is a mile south of Eccleston, Lancashire. It is also called Eccleston Delph and Eccy Delph (pronounced "ekky"). It is an old stone quarry that flooded. It is a popular site for scuba diving. Visibility is generally very poor and ropes have been strung between each underwater 'feature' to aid navigation, since traditional compass methods are all but impossible in the murky waters. Much work has been undertaken to improve visibility in the recent past, and by 2010 the visibility was much improved.

== History ==
Formerly a Mr. Hurst ran it as a stone quarry and employed 12 men. From it came stone for Blackpool Promenade, and thin split stone used as slates for roofing in the area. It was formerly also called Hurst House Delph and Marsden's Quarry.

A local resident said that "during World War II a Ministry paid a local man to run at intervals a pump to keep the quarry empty while its owner and staff were away. After the war due to official reorganization they stopped paying the local man, who therefore stopped running the pump, and over time the quarry flooded."

After it was abandoned and allowed to flood by ground water seeping in, it was an unofficial scuba diving site for a long time. The back of the quarry was cliff standing straight out of the water, and there were no buildings except a stone hut near the entrance, and a machinery shed which was submerged when the quarry flooded. Over the years the shed's sheet-metal walls and roof rusted away, leaving its metal skeleton.

On 14 October 1979 the handless body of narcotics dealer Marty Johnstone ("Mr Asia") was discovered in the quarry by local divers. Johnstone had been murdered on the orders of his associate Terry Clark ("Mr Big"). The discovery led to an international police investigation and the breakup of the "Mr Asia" narcotics gang.

Around the year 2000 it was pumped dry, and over 250 cars and much rubbish were removed from it, and it was landscaped, and re-flooded, and scuba diving centre buildings built by it, and objects were submerged for divers to dive on.

== Facilities ==
The Delph has a cafe, shop, changing facilities, swimming pool, training room, equipment hire and an air filling station.

== Images ==
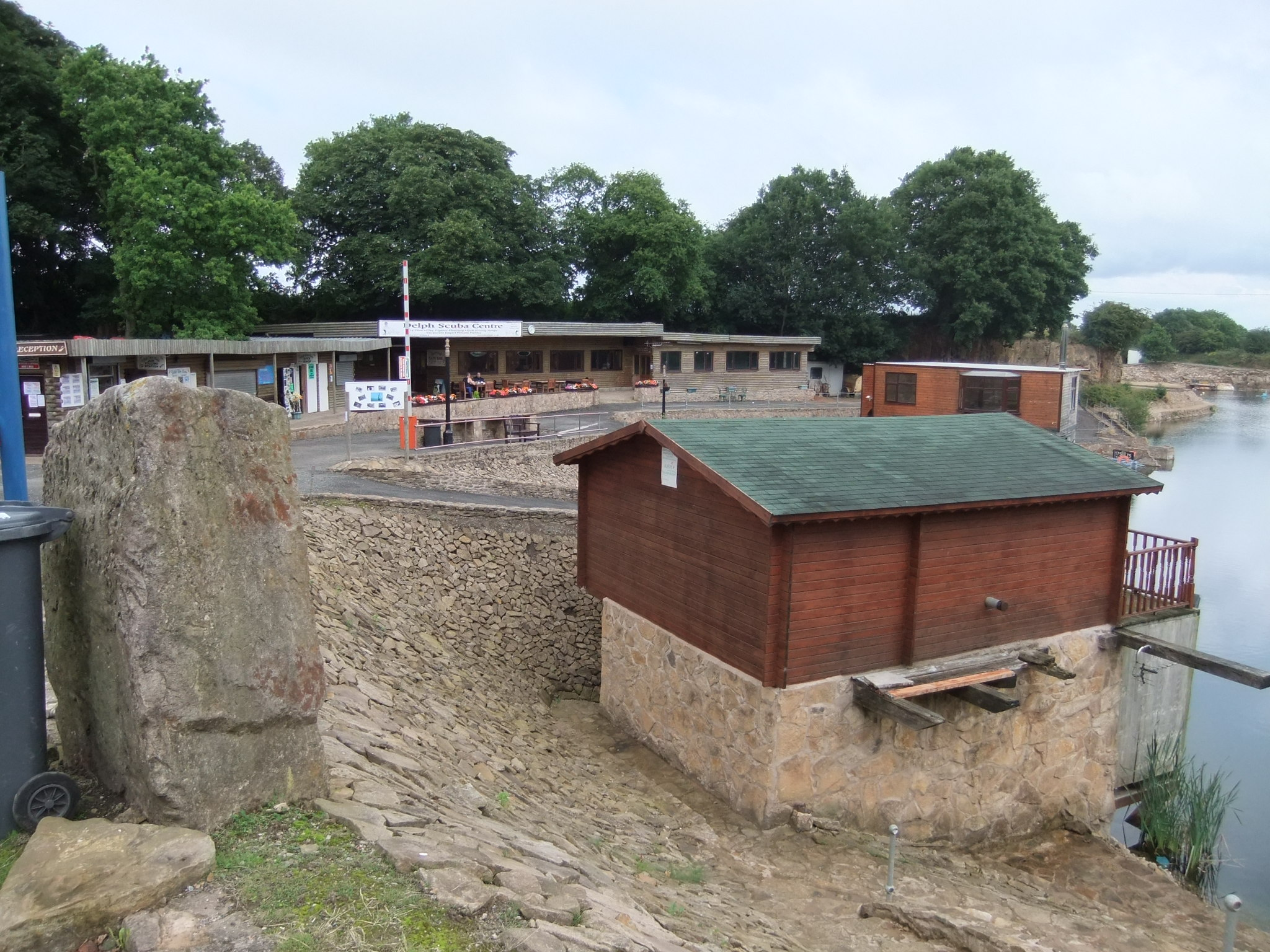
View of new buildings from edge of car park

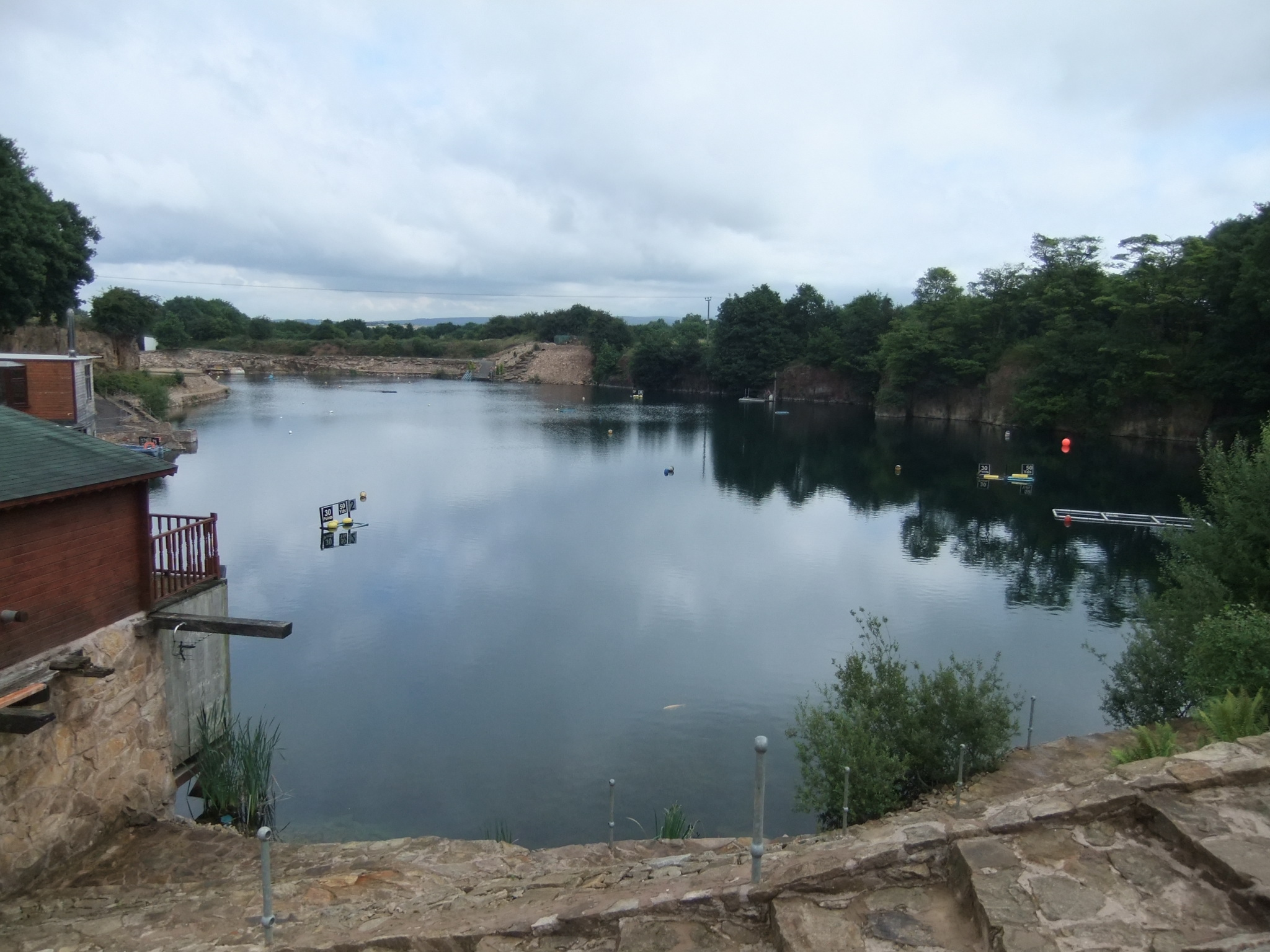
View along length of quarry from car park

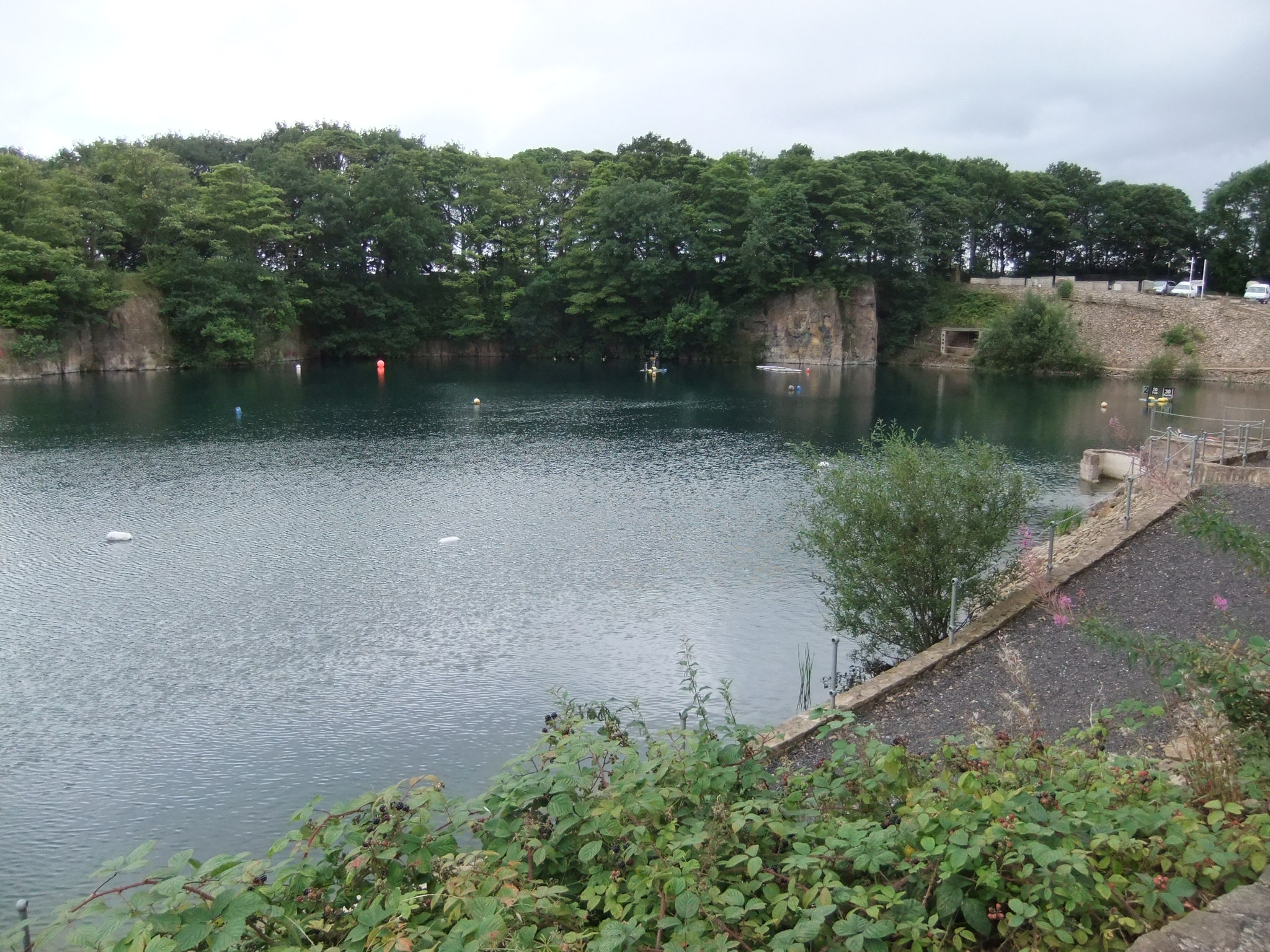
View towards cliff

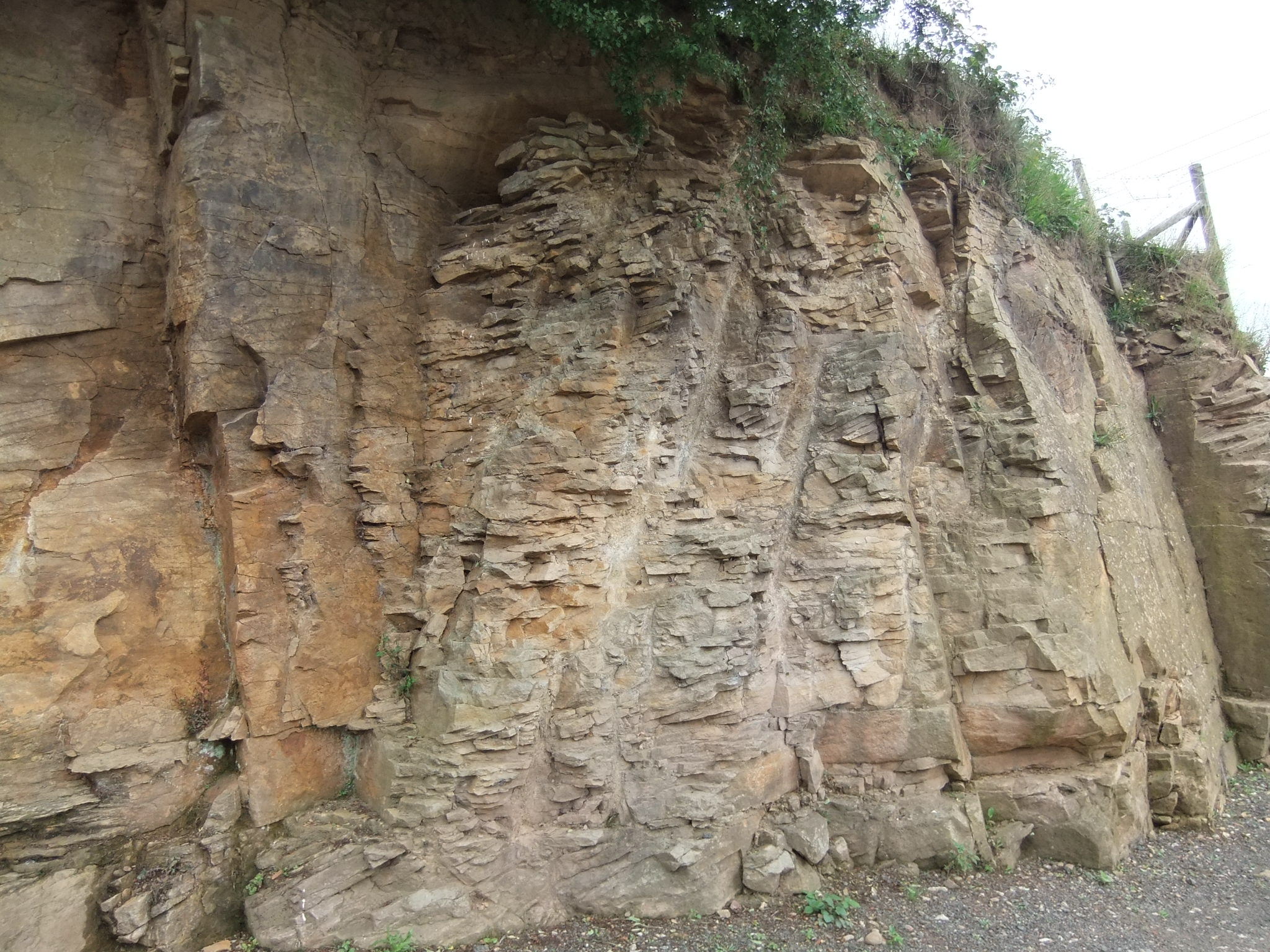
New rock exposure where a path was made, probably New Red Sandstone

== Shore facilities ==
There are many entry and exit points including shore entry with concrete slipways, sturdy steel deep entry points with fin friendly steps. Most have railings with chain linkages.

== Underwater features ==
There are many things for divers to explore including speedboats, a Jet Provost, armoured personnel carriers, a light tank, containers, a concrete tube, and a gnome garden, and a playground. As well as these there are training platforms at various depths from 3m to 9m. All are marked by surface buoys.

== Underwater life ==
The Delph is well stocked with a large variety of fish including koi carp: bags of food can be bought to feed the fish. Angling is not allowed there.

== Filming ==
A Coronation Street episode where a car nearly fell into water but was stopped by bushes, was filmed there.
