= Ava (2020 film) =

2020 American spy thriller film

- Official release poster
- Directed by: Tate Taylor
- Written by: Matthew Newton
- Produced by: Jessica Chastain; Kelly Carmichael; Nicolas Chartier; Dominic Rustam
- Starring: Jessica Chastain; John Malkovich; Common; Geena Davis; Colin Farrell; Ioan Gruffudd; Joan Chen
- Cinematography: Stephen Goldblatt
- Edited by: Zach Staenberg
- Music by: Bear McCreary
- Production companies: Voltage Pictures; Freckle Films
- Distributed by: Vertical Entertainment
- Release dates: July 2, 2020 (Budapest); August 27, 2020 (United States)
- Running time: 97 minutes
- Country: United States
- Language: English
- Box office: $3.3 million

Ava is a 2020 American action thriller film, directed by Tate Taylor, written by Matthew Newton, and produced by Jessica Chastain's production company, Freckle Films. The film stars Chastain, John Malkovich, Common, Geena Davis, Colin Farrell, Ioan Gruffudd and Joan Chen.

Ava premiered in Budapest on July 2, 2020, and in the United States through DirecTV Cinema on August 27, 2020, followed by a limited theatrical and video on demand release on September 25, 2020, by Vertical Entertainment. The film grossed $3.3 million and received generally negative reviews, though Chastain's performance received some praise.

== Plot ==
Ava Faulkner is a recovering addict and former soldier turned assassin. In France, she kidnaps her new target, an English businessman. Before she kills him, she questions him on why someone wants him dead. Unbeknownst to her, another woman electronically eavesdrops on the conversation. Afterwards, Ava flies to Boston where she visits with her estranged sister Judy and her mother Bobbi, who is hospitalized for angina pain. Ava has not seen them in eight years.

Ava's handler and former Army superior, Duke, sends her to Saudi Arabia to kill a German general. Ava lures the general into a trap and injects him with a poison to make it appear he died of a heart attack. Having blown her cover due to a mispronunciation of a man in her backstory, she is interrupted by the general's security guards. A gunfight ensues, leaving all the men dead.

Ava escapes and travels to Barneville-Carteret where Duke apologizes for the botched operation, insisting that the bad intel was a simple mistake. He gives her time off to decompress and she returns to Boston and meets Michael, her former fiancé who is now in a relationship with her sister Judy.

In British Columbia, Duke meets with his superior, Simon. Simon's daughter Camille is the woman who had earlier eavesdropped on Ava's hit. Simon believes Ava is a liability and that her questioning of targets demonstrates insufficient commitment to their operation. After Duke leaves, Simon reaffirms the hit on Ava. She kills her attacker and then confronts Duke who insists that it was a random attack by a drug addict. That night, Ava goes to dinner with Judy and Michael (as recommended by Ava's mother to reconcile and patch up their differences), but their conversation does not go well. Judy abruptly leaves the table when witty banter between Ava and Michael ensues. Michael and Ava are left to chat for a while until Michael leaves as well, still visibly upset at Ava for being gone the past 8 years with no contact. At 5 o'clock in the morning, Ava is startled awake by knocking at her hotel door. It's Judy telling her Michael has gone missing. Realizing he has started gambling again, Ava denies knowing where he is to Judy. The next scene shows Ava going to rescue him from a gambling den run by a woman, named Toni, to whom Michael is indebted for over $80,000. A fight ensues with Toni's guards after Ava tries to leave with Michael. Ava asks Toni to give her 36 hours to clear Michael's debt and Toni, seeing her guards injured on the floor, begrudgingly agrees.

Duke revisits Simon and reveals he knew Ava was set up. A fight ensues between the two men, resulting in Simon killing Duke. He sends a video of Duke's death to Ava. A heartbroken Ava goes to Judy's house, where she invites Michael to run away with her but he declines, revealing that Judy is pregnant. Ava heads to Toni's den where she kills some of her men before giving Toni a bag of money to pay off Michael's debt. Ava starts to strangle Toni, and is about to break her neck, but then changes her mind, letting her live while warning her to stay away from Michael for good.

Back at her hotel, Ava is attacked by Simon. They fight, with both sustaining serious injuries. Exhausted, Simon flees when the fire alarm goes off, warning Ava that he will kill her if he sees her again. Ava pursues Simon, cornering and killing him under the Zakim Bridge. Ava goes to her sister's house, warning Judy to leave the country and giving her the number and code to an offshore bank account filled with Ava's earnings. Before she leaves, Michael gives her a letter from Duke, who says that he is happy with how his life turned out. As she walks down the street, Ava is stalked by Simon's daughter, Camille.

== Cast ==
- Jessica Chastain as Ava Faulkner
- John Malkovich as Duke
- Common as Michael, Ava's ex-fiancé and now Judy’s fiancé
- Geena Davis as Bobbi Faulkner, Ava's mother
- Colin Farrell as Simon
- Jess Weixler as Judy Faulkner, Ava's sister
- Ioan Gruffudd as Peter Hamilton, financial advisor to the International Monetary Fund
- Diana Silvers as Camille, Simon's daughter
- Joan Chen as Toni

== Production ==
In August 2018, the production drew criticism due to Matthew Newton, who at the time was set to direct, having been accused of multiple allegations of assault and domestic violence. In addition to the accusations, he had also pleaded guilty to assaulting Brooke Satchwell, his then girlfriend. Jessica Chastain, a vocal advocate for the MeToo movement, was accused of hypocrisy for working with Newton. Newton would ultimately step down from directing the film, with Tate Taylor hired to replace him. Newton is credited as the film's writer.

In September 2018, Colin Farrell, Common, and John Malkovich joined the cast of the film, then still titled Eve. In October 2018, Christopher Domig, Diana Silvers, Geena Davis, Joan Chen, and Jess Weixler joined the cast of the film. In November 2019, it was announced the film had been re-titled Ava.

=== Filming ===
Principal photography began on September 24, 2018, in Boston, and continued in Boston, Gloucester, and Weston, Massachusetts, in the United States. Filming locations included Saint Joseph's Abbey, The Schrafft Center, Wingaersheek Beach, Worcester Regional Airport, Boston Public Market and Boston Common.

== Release ==
The film was released in Hungary on July 2, 2020. It was released in the United States through DirecTV Cinema on August 27, 2020, followed by video on demand on September 25, 2020, by Vertical Entertainment. It received a DVD and Blu-ray release in Australia on September 2, 2020, by Madman Entertainment.

It began streaming on Netflix on December 6, 2020. It was the third most-watched film on the site on its first day of release and finished first in its second day. It went on to become the top-streamed film over its first weekend.

== Reception ==
=== Box office and VOD ===
In Hungary, the film made $31,820 from 59 theaters in its opening weekend, finishing first at the box office. The film grossed a total of $3.3 million worldwide.

In its debut weekend in the U.S., Ava was the most rented film on Apple TV and Google Play, and second on FandangoNow. In its second weekend the film topped Apple TV, Google Play, and Spectrum, and remained second at FandangoNow. IndieWire described the performance of Ava as "the best showing for a non-premium title in the six months we’ve covered weekly VOD performance."

=== Critical response ===
On Rotten Tomatoes, the film holds an approval rating of 18% based on 38 reviews, with an average rating of 4.3/10. The website's critics consensus reads, "Ava seems to have all the components of an entertaining spy thriller, but not even this spectacular cast is enough to salvage the dull, clichéd story they're given to work with." On Metacritic, the film has a weighted average score of 39 out of 100, based on nine critics, indicating "generally unfavorable" reviews.

Guy Lodge of Variety wrote that "the film provides an adequate showcase for its producer-star's unexpected prowess as an action hero — yet Matthew Newton's skimpy, dial-a-cliché script makes the whole enterprise feel more like a mid-range series pilot than a major star vehicle." Writing for The Hollywood Reporter Boyd van Hoeij said that "Chastain is utterly convincing in another tough-as-nails role. If audiences stick with the movie, it's largely thanks to her movie-star charisma, which almost compensates for the increasingly ridiculous plot. Malkovich and Farrell seem to understand they are A-list talent in B-movie roles, and relish the opportunity."
