= Murder of Anita Cobby =

1986 Australian murder case

Anita Cobby
- Cobby being crowned Miss Western Suburbs in 1979
- Born: Anita Lorraine Lynch; 2 November 1959; Sydney, New South Wales, Australia
- Died: 2 February 1986 (aged 26); Prospect, New South Wales, Australia
- Cause of death: Homicide
- Resting place: Pine Grove Memorial Park
- Occupation: Nurse
- Title: Miss Western Suburbs (1979)

Anita Lorraine Cobby (née Lynch; 2 November 1959 – 2 February 1986) was a 26-year-old Australian woman from Blacktown, Sydney, who was abducted while walking home from Blacktown railway station just before 10:00 p.m. on 2 February 1986 and was subsequently raped, tortured and murdered. The case received widespread media coverage and public condemnation, including some who called for reinstating the death penalty.

Two days after being reported as missing by family, Cobby's body was discovered by a man in a paddock of his farm in Prospect. Investigations led to the arrest of five men, who were later convicted of her abduction, rape and murder on 10 June 1987. On 16 June 1987, each was sentenced to life imprisonment without the possibility of parole.

Upon arriving to the location of her body, it was clear to authorities that Cobby had sustained a prolonged and vicious attack, with multiple sharp puncture wounds and cuts, as well as lacerations from being rolled in and dragged through barbed wire. She had obvious signs of being beaten, kicked and struck, mainly from the bruising, cuts and abrasions covering a large percentage of her body. Cobby's cause of death was ultimately a result of a slit throat, an act which the medical examiner noted "nearly decapitated" her.

== Early life ==
Anita Lynch was born in Sydney on 2 November 1959, to Garry Bernard Lynch, a graphic artist with the Royal Australian Air Force, and Grace "Peggy" Lynch, a nurse. As a teenager Anita participated in beauty pageants, including winning the Miss Western Suburbs Pageant in November 1979, and had a promising career as a model. However, she decided instead to follow in her mother's footsteps into nursing.

Anita met her future husband, John Cobby, while studying for her nursing degree at Sydney Hospital. They married on 27 March 1982. At the time of her murder in 1986, the couple had separated and Anita was living with her parents in Blacktown. According to John, he and Anita were on good terms and, when she was murdered, had been planning to reconcile.

== Murder ==
Cobby worked in Sydney and commuted daily from her home in Blacktown. On the day of the murder, she finished work at Sydney Hospital at 3 p.m. and met friends for dinner in nearby Redfern. Cobby then caught a train from Central railway station to Blacktown station. Arriving at Blacktown, she would usually ring her father who would pick her up. On the day of her death, she most likely decided to walk home after finding the phone to be out of order and no taxis available at the taxi rank. Aside from her killers, only two witnesses saw Cobby after she left the train station.

Cobby was walking alone from the station along Newton Road, Blacktown around 10 p.m., when the gang of five men drove up beside her and stopped their stolen white HT Holden Kingswood. Two men leapt from the car and dragged her into the vehicle, as she kicked and screamed. A teenage boy, his younger sister, and his mother heard someone screaming from the street in front of their house and had gone outside in time to see Cobby forced into the attackers' car. The boy ran across the road to help, but the car drove off before he reached it. Returning home, he telephoned the police to report what he had seen. A few minutes later, their neighbour and his girlfriend arrived home and, after being told of the abduction, drove off to search for the car. They eventually drove down Reen Road (now known as Peter Brock Drive), Prospect and stopped by the now-empty Holden, where the man used a spotlight to search the adjacent paddock. Seeing nothing in the paddock and believing the car he was looking for was a different model Holden, he returned home. The attackers later stated that they had hidden in the long grass to avoid the spotlight and waited for the man to leave.

Once inside the car on Newton Road, Cobby had been ordered to strip off her clothes but refused, begging her attackers to let her go and saying she was married and also menstruating. Her attackers punched Cobby repeatedly, breaking her nose and both cheekbones, before forcing her to perform fellatio on all five men. The attackers then drove to a service station to purchase fuel using money stolen from Cobby's purse. Cobby was then driven down Reen Road to the secluded paddock, while being held down in the car, raped repeatedly, and being continually beaten by her five attackers. They then dragged the brutally beaten Cobby into the paddock along a barbed wire fence, where they dumped her and continued to sexually and physically abuse her for some time. According to his taped confession, one of the attackers, John Travers, then became concerned that Cobby could identify them because she had seen their faces and heard their names, and convinced the other attackers to kill her. Urged on by the others, Travers cut her throat, almost severing her head.

== Police investigation ==
When Cobby did not return home, her family initially thought she was staying overnight with a friend, but after learning that she failed to appear at work the next day, they reported her missing on 3 February. On the morning of 4 February, her naked body was found in the paddock by a farmer investigating what his cows were milling around. Cobby's body was initially identified by her distinctive wedding ring, which was still on her finger when she was found. Her estranged husband John was initially suspected of her murder, but was quickly cleared.

The Australian public reacted with anger upon hearing details of Cobby's murder. On 6 February, the NSW State Government posted a A$50,000 reward (equivalent to $149,000 in 2022) for information leading to the capture of Cobby's killers. Also on 6 February, morning radio host John Laws obtained a leaked copy of Cobby's autopsy report, which contained explicit details of her injuries, and read it live on the air, both shocking and galvanising public sentiment. In a 2016 interview with Seven News, Laws said he did it because he felt "the general public ought to know" and that "it incited anger in the public that murders like this were happening and we weren't being given the full details".

On 9 February, police re-enacted Cobby's movements on the night of her disappearance in the hope of jogging the memories of travellers or others who might have seen her. Constable Debbie Wallace wore similar clothing to Cobby and travelled the 9:12 p.m. train to Blacktown. Detectives interviewed the passengers and showed them photos of Cobby while Wallace walked the length of the train during the journey.

Following a tip-off from a police informant regarding the stolen Holden, police started searching for Travers, Michael Murdoch, and brothers Les, Michael, and Gary Murphy after they discovered that some of them had a history of violence, and that Travers had a reputation for carrying a knife. On 21 February, police arrested Travers and Murdoch at the home of Travers' uncle and Les Murphy at Travers' own house. Murdoch and Murphy were charged with offences relating to stolen cars and released on police bail. Travers, who admitted that he had stolen a car, made conflicting statements about the murder and was detained in police custody. While in custody, he requested that a friend be called so she could bring him cigarettes. The phone number was handed to the investigating police who contacted the friend, a woman.

The woman, Travers' girlfriend — eventually dubbed "Miss X" — agreed to help with the investigation, met with an officer, and gave him details of Travers' background. Miss X was subsequently sent back in to talk to Travers, agreeing to hide a recording microphone device in her bra while she visited him in his cell and was able to obtain a confession. Miss X later went to Murdoch's home while wearing the concealed recording device to capture his statements on tape as well. Eventually, five men were arrested and charged with the murder. Police were praised for their quick response in capturing all suspects involved. In total, 22 days had elapsed from the time of the murder to the time all suspects were taken into custody.

== Perpetrators ==
The five men charged, who later all pleaded guilty or were convicted of the murder, had over fifty prior convictions for offences including armed robbery, assault, larceny, car theft, breaking and entering, drug use, escaping lawful custody, receiving stolen goods and rape.

=== John Travers ===
John Raymond Travers, aged 18 in 1986, was considered the ringleader of the gang. He was raised in relative poverty in Blacktown, the oldest of eight children from unmarried teenage parents. By age 14, he was already an alcoholic, and was expelled from high school during Year 10 for being continually disruptive to other students. Beyond schooling, Travers held few jobs and relied mostly on unemployment benefits as a source of income. He was eventually committed to Boys' Town, a juvenile detention facility, by his mother. His father, with whom he never shared a close relationship, left the household in 1981. Finding it difficult to support the family, Travers relied on crime to provide food, such as stealing animals for the family's dinners, including chickens and ducks from nearby households. The health of Travers' mother eventually deteriorated, and he and his siblings were sent to live with foster families while she was placed in a hospice. Travers had a history of violent sexual behaviour, against males and females, as well as bestiality; during the times when he resorted to stealing poultry for his family's meals, he is alleged to have sexually abused the birds prior to butchering and cooking them. Witnesses have also recounted that, on several occasions, Travers had acquired a live lamb or sheep for butchering prior to a barbecue party, alleging that he slit the animals’ throats as he sodomised and abused them sexually—before butchering and roasting the carcass on a spit.

=== Michael Murdoch ===
Michael James Murdoch, aged 18 in 1986, was a childhood friend and criminal associate of Travers. He had also spent a great part of his childhood in juvenile prisons, where he experienced sexual assaults. He was known to have written to politicians during this period of imprisonment seeking protection from such assaults.

=== Murphy brothers ===
Michael, Gary, and Les Murphy, three brothers from an Irish Australian family of nine children, were also accused of the crime.

- Michael Murphy, aged 33, was the eldest of the nine Murphy children. He was sent to live with his grandmother when he was 12 years of age.
- Gary Stephen Murphy, aged 28. A hearing impairment affected Gary's schooling and he left early to seek work. He was noted as being an able and willing worker before the crimes. Gary's strong interest in cars led to him facing several car theft-related charges in the years preceding the murder.
- Les Murphy, aged 22, was the youngest of the Murphy children, and was known as having the worst temperament. He had faced Children's Court on many occasions for a number of theft-related offences before being accused of the Cobby murder.

== Trial ==
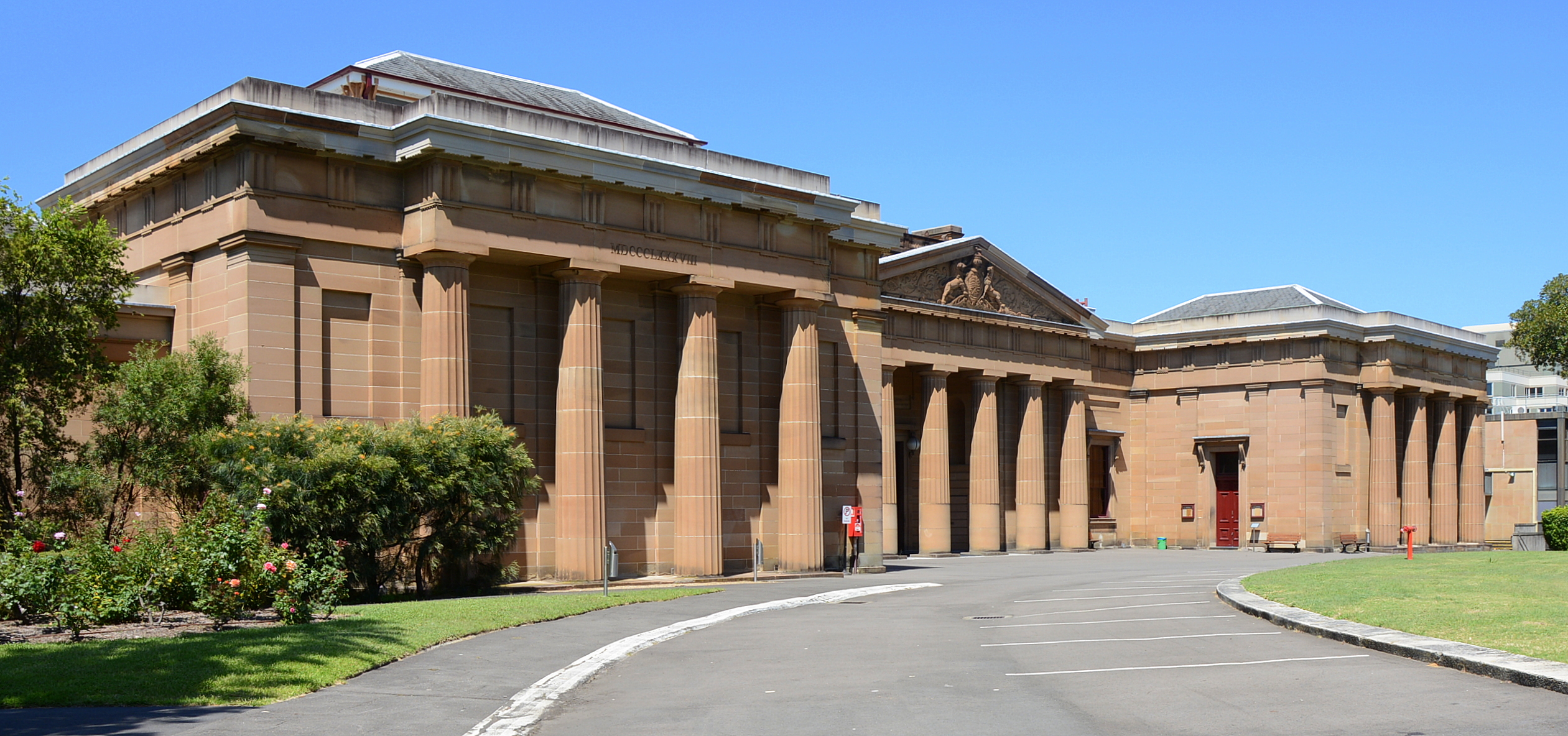
Venue of the trial: No 5 court at Darlinghurst Courthouse

The trial began in Sydney on 16 March 1987. Before proceedings began, Travers changed his plea to guilty. Sydney newspaper The Sun published a front-page story on the day the trial began, carrying the headline "ANITA MURDER MAN GUILTY" alongside a large image of Travers. The news story also referred to Michael Murphy as an unemployed prison escapee of no fixed address, and another in the same paper detailed Murphy's criminal convictions and his recent escape from Silverwater Correctional Centre, where he was serving a 25-year sentence for a string of burglaries and thefts. The jury was discharged due to the potentially prejudicial information published about Murphy.

According to the medical examiner's report, Cobby's body showed extensive bruising on her head, breasts, face, shoulders, groin, thighs and legs consistent with "a systematic beating", including a "blow of considerable force around the right eye". She also had lacerations on her hips, thighs and legs from the barbed wire, several cuts to her neck resulting in the severing of her ear and windpipe and near decapitation, and many cuts to her hands and fingers, resulting in the near severing of three of her fingers, which likely occurred when she raised her hands to her face trying to protect herself from the knife. The medical examiner later testified that after Cobby's throat was cut, she would have died within two minutes. He also testified that some radio bulletins purportedly based on his own report contained misinformation about the type and extent of Cobby's injuries. She was not mutilated apart from the slashing of her throat and hands, there had been no attack with a knife on her stomach or genitals, and her shoulders had not been dislocated.

The trial for the remaining members of the gang lasted 54 days, with the men's defence relying on convincing the jury of their minimal involvement in the beating and murder. On 10 June 1987, all five were found guilty of sexual assault and murder. On 16 June, they were each sentenced in the Supreme Court of New South Wales to life imprisonment plus additional time without the possibility of parole. Justice Alan Maxwell described the crime as, "One of the most horrifying physical and sexual assaults. This was a calculated killing done in cold blood. The Executive should grant the same degree of mercy they bestowed on their victim."

== Aftermath ==
Cobby's parents would join forces with Christine and Peter Simpson, the parents of murder victim Ebony Simpson, to create the Homicide Victims' Support Group (Aust) Inc.—a community support group that helps families deal with heinous crimes. The Lynches also campaigned in seeking tougher sentencing and truth in sentencing laws, which eventuated after Cobby's murder. Cobby's father Garry Lynch died on 14 September 2008, aged 90, suffering from Alzheimer's disease. Her mother, Grace, died of lung cancer in 2013, at the age of 88. The Lynches had been married for 54 years at the time of Garry's death.

== Imprisonment ==
As of 2025, John Travers was housed in Wellington Correctional Centre in maximum security. In 1996, he and another inmate were being transported from Goulburn to Long Bay when they attempted to escape from the prison van by hacksawing through and kicking in the back door. When the attempt was noticed, the van pulled over at Bowral Police Station, and the two were arrested and charged. Since being sentenced, Travers has spent time in Long Bay, Parklea, Maitland, Goulburn, Grafton, Lithgow, and Wellington Correctional Centres.

Michael Murphy was housed in Long Bay Hospital in maximum security. During his imprisonment Murphy had been held in Long Bay, Maitland, and Lithgow, then spent majority of that time at Goulburn until being diagnosed with liver cancer. He died in Long Bay Hospital on 21 February 2019 at the age of 66.

As of 2025, Gary Murphy was housed in Goulburn Correctional Centre in maximum security. On the morning of 25 June 2019, he was severely beaten by several other prisoners in the shower block of 10 Wing at the Metropolitan Special Program Centre at Long Bay, and was transferred to hospital in critical condition. On 23 August 2020 it was revealed by the Daily Telegraph that Murphy had been moved back from Long Bay to Goulburn after being bashed. Since being sentenced Murphy has spent time at Long Bay, Maitland, Lithgow, Junee, and Goulburn Correctional Centres.

As of 2025, Les Murphy was housed in Goulburn Correctional Centre in maximum security. Since being sentenced, Murphy has spent time in Long Bay, Parklea, Lithgow, Grafton, Maitland, and Goulburn Correctional Centres.

As of 2025, Michael Murdoch was housed in Goulburn Correctional Centre in maximum security. Since being sentenced Murdoch has spent time in Long Bay, Parklea, Windsor, Maitland, Bathurst, Lithgow, Junee, and Goulburn Correctional Centres.

After the death of Michael Murphy, as of 22 February 2019, NSW Corrective Services confirmed the four other offenders were still alive and were still serving their life sentences in various maximum-security correctional centres across New South Wales, but it could not be revealed where they were currently being housed.

== Media ==
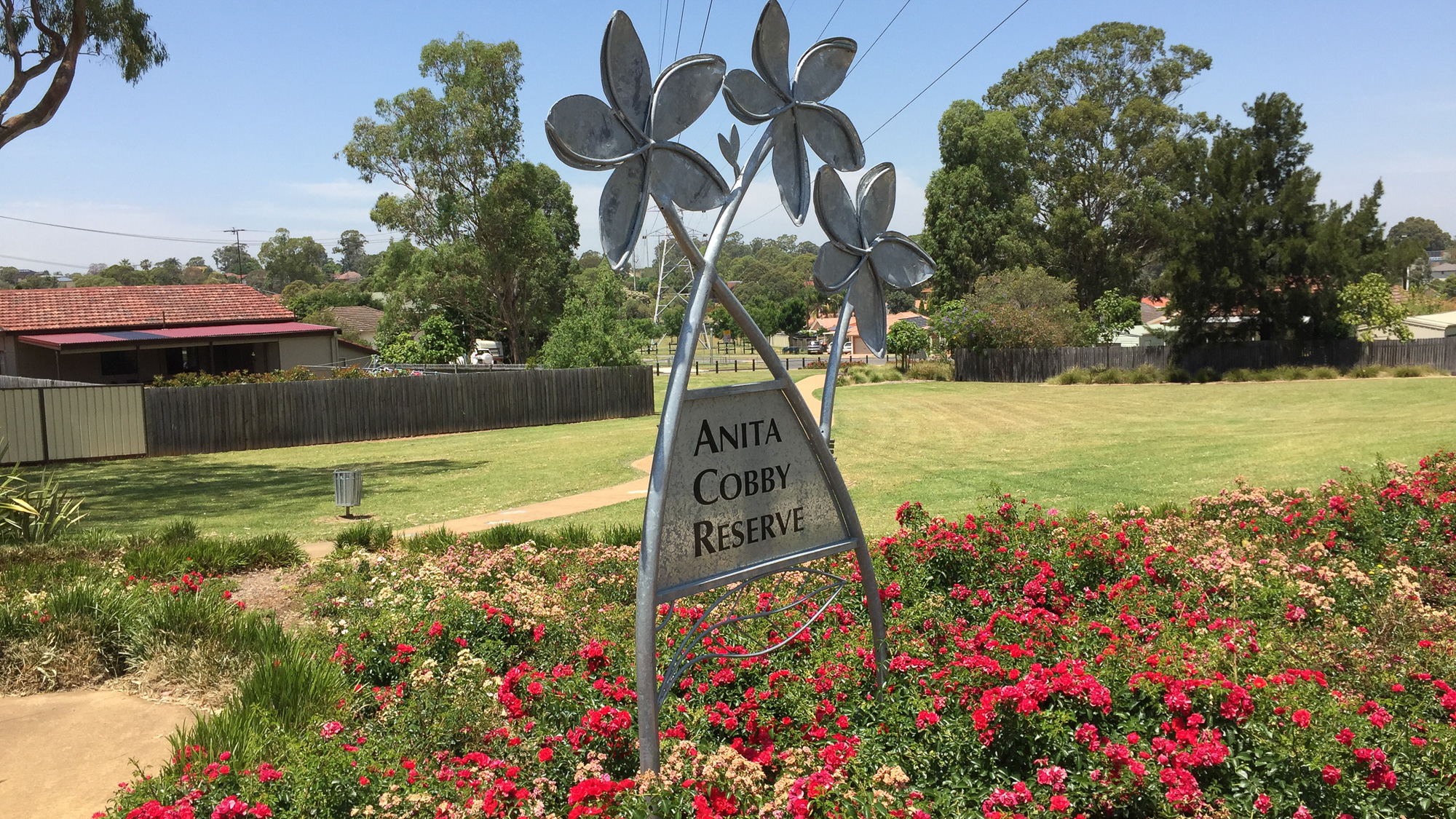
Anita Cobby Reserve, Sullivan St., Blacktown

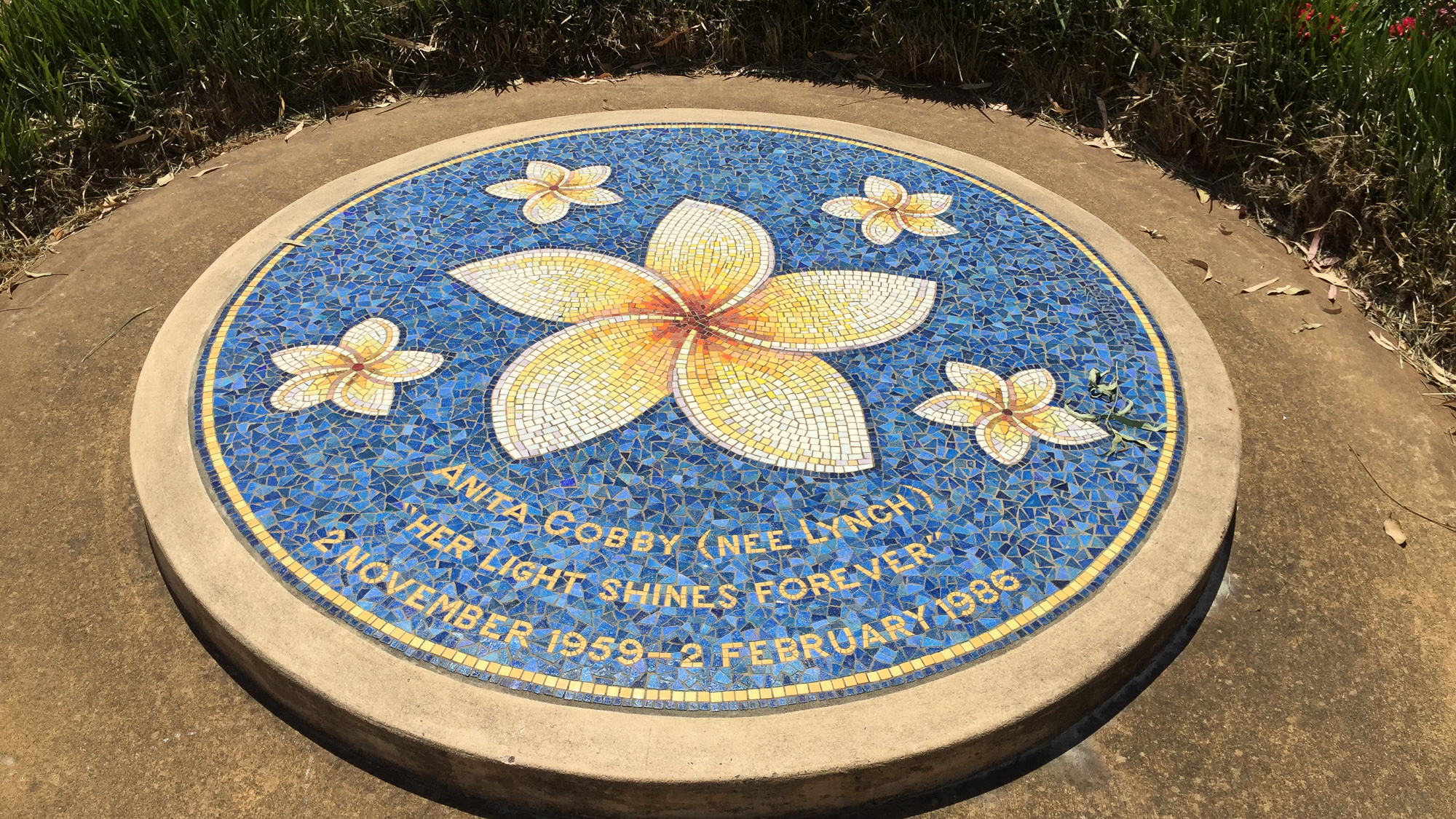
Anita Cobby Memoriał

The murder has been covered by several true crime television series, including Crime Investigation Australia in 2006, Crime Stories in 2008, and Australian Families of Crime in 2010. The case was covered by Casefile True Crime Podcast on 22 July 2017. It has also been the subject of several books (see Further reading).

The Australian social-realist film The Boys (1998), directed by Rowan Woods, is, in part, inspired by the Cobby murder and follows the journey of three brothers leading up to a similar crime.

In February 2016, at the time of the 30th anniversary of the murder, police released the taped confessions of Travers and Murdoch that were obtained by Miss X. Seven News broadcast a documentary, 7 News Investigates: Anita Cobby — You Thought You Knew It All, which included the newly released taped confessions and John Cobby's first televised interview about his wife's murder.

A 90-minute documentary titled Anita was released in 2016, on the 30th anniversary of the murder.

== Memorial ==
A park in Sullivan Street, Blacktown was named ‘Anita Cobby Reserve’ in memory of Cobby.

== See also ==
- Murder of Janine Balding
- Murder of Sian Kingi
- List of kidnappings
- Lists of solved missing person cases
