= Pinegrove Memorial Park =

Cemetery in Sydney, Australia

- Headstone of Kevin Wheatley VC
- Interactive map of Pinegrove Memorial Park

Details
- Established: 1962
- Location: Minchinbury
- Country: Australia
- Coordinates: 33°47′25″S 150°50′52″E
- Owned by: Independent
- Size: 175 acres (71 ha)
- No. of graves: >12,000
- Website: Pinegrove Memorial Park
- Find a Grave: Pinegrove Memorial Park

Pinegrove Memorial Park is a cemetery and crematorium in Minchinbury, located in the western suburbs of Sydney, Australia. First established in 1962, Pinegrove Memorial Park is set on 175 acres and is one of the largest, independently owned cemeteries in the Sydney region. On the grounds of Pinegrove Memorial Park are two chapels and a florist. The park is accessible to the public from sunrise to sunset.

Within the park is the 'Chinese Memorial Garden – Lung Po Shan' for the interment of Chinese Australians.

Terra Santa is a new crypt memorial development at Pinegrove Memorial Park located close to North and West Chapels. This crypt complex will be the largest in the southern hemisphere. This will contain 640 crypts in total.

Pinegrove Memorial Park is also home to Heart of Angels – a dedicated baby and child memorial garden within the cemetery that accommodates both cremation and burial memorials. This memorial is the largest dedicated child and baby memorial garden in the southern hemisphere.

== Notable burials ==
- Anita Cobby, murder victim
- Tony Johnson, politician
- Ron Mulock, 10th Deputy Premier of New South Wales
- Jim Southee, politician
- Sir Bertram Stevens, 25th Premier of New South Wales
- Kevin Wheatley, Victoria Cross recipient

Robert Trimbole
