= Marty Johnstone =

New Zealand drug trafficker

Christopher Martin "Marty" Johnstone (1951–1979) was a New Zealand drug trafficker born in Auckland who was called "Mr Asia" by the Auckland Star newspaper in August 1978 in a series of articles by Pat Booth.

== Murder ==
In October 1979, Johnstone was lured to Britain on the pretext of a drug deal to take place in Scotland. He was murdered by Andy Maher, by order of Terrance John Clark, and his handless body was dumped in Eccleston Delph, Lancashire. Maher cut off Johnstone's hands and mutilated his face in a vain attempt to foil dental identification by the police.

Terry Clark, along with four others, was subsequently convicted of murdering Johnstone and was sentenced to life imprisonment. The trial at Lancaster Castle (during its time as HM Prison Lancaster) in 1980 was conducted under heavy security and was Britain's most expensive case at that time. Clark suffered a heart attack in 1983 and died in prison on the Isle of Wight.

The case was dramatised in an episode of the TV series Crime Story titled "All Good Friends: The Case of the Handless Corpse" (1992).
