= Use Me (Kid Courageous song) =

"The Use Me EP"

Single by Kid Courageous

from the album Dear Diary
- Released: 31 October 2005
- Recorded: 2005
- Genre: Rock
- Length: 2:43
- Label: RockSugar, Universal

Kid Courageous singles chronology
"Life's a Movie" (2005)	"The Use Me EP" (2005)	"I Want You" (2006)

"Use Me" is the third single by Kid Courageous, taken from their debut album Dear Diary. The single was released as The Use Me EP on 31 October 2005, and reached number 24 on the ARIA Singles Chart.

== Track listing ==
CD single / iTunes EP
No.	Title	Length
1.	"Use Me" (radio edit)	2:32
2.	"One in a Million"	3:00
3.	"Broken Dreams"	3:02
4.	"About a Pretty Girl from a Far Away Town"	4:03
5.	"When Goodbye Means Forever"	3:46

== Charts ==
Chart (2005)	Peak position
Australia (ARIA)	24

== Release history ==
Region	Date	Label	Format	Catalogue
Australia	31 October 2005	RockSugar, Universal	CD single, digital download	SUGAREP1
