= The Big Night In with John Foreman =

Australian television series

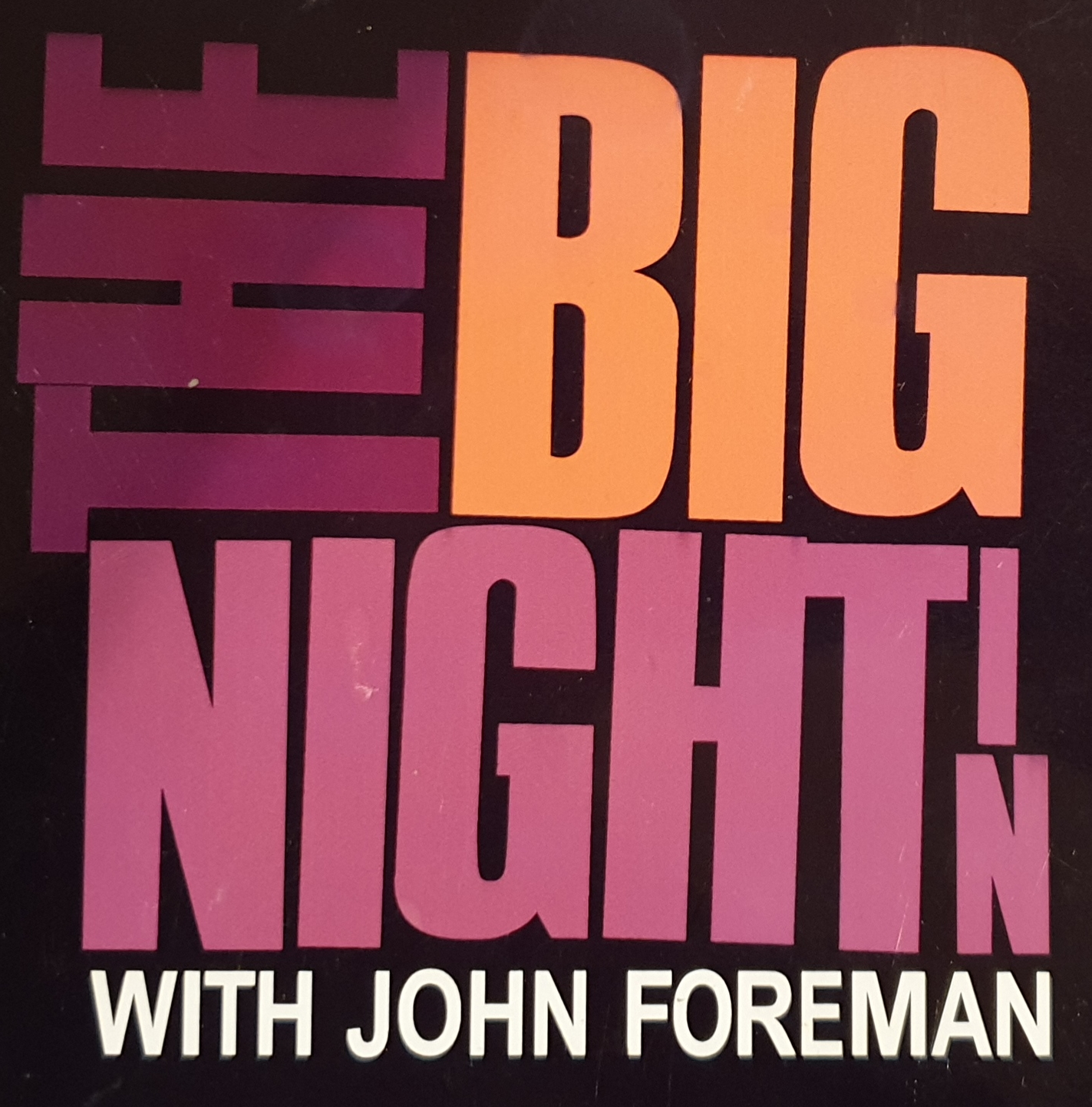
The Big Night In With John Foreman

The Big Night In with John Foreman was an Australian variety show airing on Network Ten and Ovation. It premiered on 3 December 2005 and concluded its first series 6 January 2006 then returned for another season in October 2006.

It ran overnight, usually starting at either 11.30pm or past 12am. The show's premise is based on having musical acts perform and give interviews in a late-night chat show format with a bigger focus on musical guests and interviews with those guests. It was hosted by John Foreman, a renowned Australian musician who has appeared on shows such as Good Morning Australia and Australian Idol as a musical director.

The show was notable for its premiere when an in-depth and engaging interview was featured with Russell Crowe. Crowe later performed two songs for the show. This episode also featured guests Tina Cousins and Deborah Conway. It often included ad lib promotions by the cast and guests, in a style reminiscent of Graham Kennedy's variety programs.

== Episode guide ==
Series 1

Episode N°	Guests
Episode 1	Tina Cousins Deborah Conway Russell Crowe Jade McCrae
Episode 2	The Cat Empire End of Fashion The Living End Vanessa Lambrou John Michael Howson
Episode 3	Melissa Tkautz Taxiride Alice Russell Radio Dogs John Michael Howson
Episode 4 - Christmas Special	Human Nature Sarah McLeod Kate DeAraugo Magic Dirt The Harlequin Smile John Michael Howson
Episode 5	Renee Geyer Patrizio Buanne Ricki-Lee Coulter Mia Dyson True Live
Episode 6	Youth Group Casey Donovan Tania Doko Dan Kelly Describe Eliza Michelle Anderson
Episode 7 - Best Of	Previous Guests' Highlights

Series 2

Episode N°	Guests
Episode 1	Ronan Keating Guy Sebastian Tim Freedman Lior Val Lehman Sam Mac
Episode 2	Sarah McLeod The Spazzys Evermore Kamahl Sam Mac
Episode 3	Don Lane Chris Murphy Kid Courageous Gang Gajang Sam Mac
Episode 4	Dean Geyer Bree Amer Mike Goldman Sarah Blaskow Kate Alexa Sam Mac
Episode 5	Osher Günsberg Jessica Mauboy Damien Leith Patrizio Buanne The Whitlams Maria Venuti Matthew Newton
Episode 6	Diesel TV Rock The Young Divas Sam Mac
Episode 7	Marcia Hines Tania Doko with She Said Yes Dallas Crane Barry Crocker Michelle van Raay & the Deb Johnson Dancers Matt Hollywood Sam Mac
Episode 8 - Best of	Previous Guests' Highlights
Episode 9 - Christmas Special	Peter Garrett Sick Puppies with Juan Mann Mig Ayesa Maria Venuti Sam Mac
Episode 10 - NYE Party Mix	Anthony Callea John Paul Young Kid Courageous Dragon Jade MacRae Jemma Gawned Maria Venuti Mig Ayessa Matt Hollywood Jamie Brooksby Matthew Newton

== Burt Bacharach Special ==
On 10 October 2007, ‘John Foreman Presents Burt Bacharach’, a special presentation of The Big Night In, was broadcast on Network Ten. It was taped at the State Theatre in Sydney, and featured a line-up of Australian artists performing songs composed by Bacharach, accompanied by the Sydney Sinfonia. Bacharach appeared on the show, was interviewed by Foreman and performed his composition, “Alfie”.

Performer	Musical Number
Paulini	Say A Little Prayer
Diesel	Walk On By
Katie Noonan	The Look Of Love
Kate Ceberano	I Just Don't Know What To Do With Myself
Dean Geyer	Arthur's Theme
Leo Sayer	"Always Something There to Remind Me"
Ricki-Lee Coulter	What The World Needs now
Burt Bacharach	Alfie

== New Year's Eve 2006 special ==
On 31 December 2006, a special episode was broadcast on the Ten Network featuring Anthony Callea, John Paul Young, Matthew Newton, New Zealand band Dragon, Jade MacRae and cabaret performer Maria Venuti. It was meant to be different from the telecasts that the Nine Network had provided in past years in that it was mainly aimed at a younger audience.

Despite that clear focus, older viewers and families complained about the content on the programme, calling talkback radio stations such as 2GB to complain the programme had strong language and sexual references; and that Newton was intoxicated, though there was little to none of the alleged content in the programme. Based on the talkback reaction, The Daily Telegraph, along with the daily tabloid programmes on competing networks (Today Tonight and A Current Affair) attacked Ten's broadcast. It is thought that those viewers and media sources may have been confused by another televised presentation the same night involving the musical Priscilla, Queen of the Desert.

The show aired from 9:30pm until 11:30pm, and was the lead-up to Network Ten's coverage of the New Year's Eve Sydney Fireworks.

The show was one of the last variety productions to be taped at Global Television's studios in North Ryde, NSW (Network Ten's former Sydney headquarters).
