= Kid Courageous =

Australian pop punk band

- Origin: Sutherland, New South Wales, Australia
- Genre: Pop punk
- Years active: 2004–2007
- Label: RockSugar Music
- Past members: Mick Anderson; Huw Griffiths; Patrick Ricapito; Richie Newman; Dave Simon; Laurent Saligne; Dave Barker; Ben Neilson

Kid Courageous were an Australian pop punk band from Sutherland, New South Wales. The band consisted of Mick Anderson (lead vocals, piano), Huw Griffiths (guitar, vocals), Patrick Ricapito (lead guitar), Richie Newman (drums) and Dave Simon (bass guitar). All five members of the band grew up in the Sutherland Shire in New South Wales.

== History ==
Throughout the mid-2000s Kid Courageous were one of Australia's premiere commercial pop punk acts, with a number of successful charting singles. Prior to being signed to a label, the band released their debut single 'Miss Singleton' (later released on Dear Diary) in 2003.

The band were signed to the Australian independent label RockSugar Music after working with longtime friend and Australian producer Greg Stace. During January 2005, Kid Courageous recorded three singles at Studios 301 in Sydney with American producer Rick Will and Australian producer Greg Stace. The band was managed by industry veteran Vicki Gordon and later Mark Burn.

"Is She Really Going Out with Him?" was their debut single and was a cover of the Joe Jackson hit. It received an "overwhelming response" and was the fourth most added track across the board on radio in Australia. It held a #1 night radio position for 11 weeks, and it charted at #25 on the ARIA Singles Chart and #3 on the Australian Independent charts..

"Life's a Movie", their second single, also achieved success, topping the Australian nightly radio charts for 10 weeks. It peaked at #17 on the ARIA Singles Chart and #1 on the Australian independent charts.

"Use Me", their third single, debuted at #24 on the ARIA Singles Chart and #1 on the Australian Independent music charts.

"I Want You", their crossover single, was mixed by Greg Stace and was released as an iTunes-only digital single in 2006.

Dear Diary, their debut album, produced by Rick Will (Incubus, Gwen Stefani, Ben Harper), was released on 6 May 2006.

Vocalist Mick Anderson was voted 2005 Australian "Spunk of the Year" in Dolly Magazine.

Kid Courageous broke up in 2007 not long after recording their self-titled second album, which was issued on iTunes in 2011.

== Members ==
- Mick Anderson – lead vocals, piano
- Davie Patience – bass guitar
- Huw Griffiths – guitar, vocals
- Patrick Ricapito – lead guitar
- Laurent Saligne / Richie Newman – drums
- David Barker - Guitar
- Ben Neilson - Guitar, Vocals

== Discography ==
=== Albums ===
List of albums, with selected details
Title	Details
Dear Diary	Released: 2006; Label: RockSugar Music (SUGARA1); Format: CD
Kid Courageous	Released: 2009; Label: Radtone Music (RADC-042); Format: CD

=== Singles ===
List of singles, with selected chart positions
Title	Year	Peak chart positions		Album
Title	Year	AUS	AUS Ind.	Album
"Is She Really Going Out with Him?"	2005	25	1	Dear Diary
"Life's a Movie"	2005	39	1	Dear Diary
"Use Me"	2005	24	1	Dear Diary
"I Want You"	2006	—	—	Dear Diary
