= Nick Paltos =

Australian doctor and criminal (1940-2003)

Nicholas George Paltos (c. 1940 – 26 December 2003) was an Australian doctor who became a convicted criminal.

== Early life ==
Paltos was born Nicholas George Paltos (or possibly Nicholas John Paltos) in 1940 or 1941 on the small Greek island of Kastelorizon The youngest of ten children, his family migrated from Greece to Melbourne, Australia in 1947. After the death of his mother in 1949, his family moved to Sydney in 1955, where he first became acquainted with gambling, which was to be his downfall.

Paltos attended school until he was 13, when he left and worked at a chrome metal factory. In 1955, he moved with his father to Sydney, where he worked as an apprentice in a Sydenham metal factory, completing a diploma course in electroplating.

Paltos enrolled at Sydney Technical College in 1959 and took two years to complete his matriculation. He then won a scholarship to study medicine at the University of New South Wales in 1962. After completing studies, he commenced work at the Sydney Hospital in 1969, and in 1978 took up private practice with rooms in Woolloomooloo.

== Career ==
He studied and worked part-time as a taxi driver and salesman. He also met his future wife, Marie Kratzis, whom he married in January 1967. He completed his studies in 1968 and joined the staff of Sydney Hospital. A year later he was appointed to the emergency and casualty department.

Paltos frequented illegal gaming venues, in particular the Goulburn Club, and racecourses. He knew people who moved in that world, including Graham "Croc" Palmer. He met George Freeman as a doctor and became friends with him.

In 1978, Paltos took up private practice in Riley Street, Woolloomooloo. His patients included high-flyers such as former NSW Supreme Court chief justice Laurence Street, media tycoon Kerry Packer and broadcaster John Laws. He warned ex-Goon Harry Secombe that if he did not lose some of his 129 kilograms, he would die. Secombe took that advice and credited Paltos with saving his life.

Paltos fathered two children and lived in a two-storey home, Gwandalan, in one of Sydney's most expensive suburbs, Bellevue Hill.

His gambling issues continued. In 1982 he borrowed $300,000 from the family company of a solicitor, Ross Karp. In an effort to pay mounting debts he became involved in criminal activity.

== First conviction ==
In 1986, Paltos pleaded guilty to charges of conspiring to import 5.5 tonnes of hashish into Australia.

== Second conviction ==
In 1990, Paltos was convicted on charges of conspiring to pervert the course of justice, along with police detective Roger Rogerson, for using bank accounts under false names to hide improperly gotten money.
