= Turkey shoot (disambiguation) =

A turkey shoot is an extremely one-sided battle or contest.

Turkey shoot may also refer to:

- Battle of the Philippine Sea, a naval battle of World War II on 19–20 June 1944
- Turkey Shoot (1982 film), directed by Brian Trenchard-Smith
- Turkey Shoot (2014 film), directed by Jon Hewitt
- "Turkey Shoot" (Schitt's Creek), an episode of Schitt's Creek
