= Damien Richardson (actor) =

Australian actor

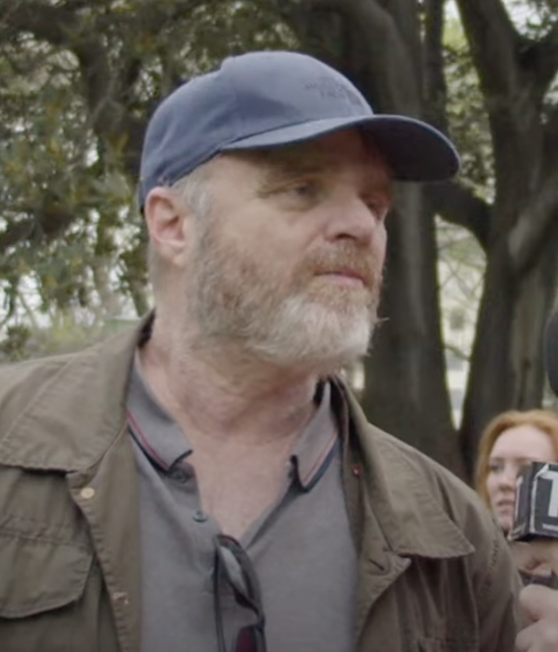
- Born: 2 August 1969 (age 57); Adelaide, South Australia, Australia
- Occupations: Actor, writer
- Years active: 1988–2021
- Political party: Freedom
- Other political affiliations: Independent
- Spouse: Nicole Riches (until 2016)
- Partner: Fifi Box (2016–2018)
- Children: 3

Damien Richardson (born 2 August 1969) is an Australian political activist and former actor. Richardson is known his roles as Detective Matt Ryan in the crime drama City Homicide, which he played from 2007 until 2011, and as Gary Canning in the soap opera Neighbours from 2014 to 2020. He has also appeared in a variety of Australian films and television shows, including Blue Heelers, McLeod's Daughters, Rogue, Conspiracy 365, and Wentworth. From 2012, Richardson starred as Drew Greer in the Jack Irish television films and subsequent 2016 series.

Richardson retired from acting in 2021 and unsuccessfully stood as a candidate in the 2022 Australian federal election and the 2022 Victorian state election, running on an anti-vaccination platform for the hard right Victorian Freedom Party. In December 2024, he was charged with publicly performing a Nazi salute at a meeting of far-right activists. He was convicted of the offense in 2025.

== Early and life and education ==
Damien Richardson was born in Adelaide.

He studied political science and Australian cinema and theatre at Flinders University in Adelaide and from 1989 attended the Victorian College of the Arts, graduating in 1991

== Acting career ==
=== Stage ===
Richardson co-wrote The Belly Of The Whale with Luke Elliot, which was presented at the Melbourne Fringe Festival in 1996.

He appeared in the Melbourne Theatre Company production of The Water Carriers in 2011, and was cast as Chris in the 2012 Bell Shakespeare production of The School for Wives.

Richardson starred alongside Kate Kendall in the 2015 production of Frankie and Johnny in the Clair de Lune. The play was directed by their fellow Neighbours co-star and Richardson's on-screen mother Colette Mann.

=== Film and TV ===
Richardson had guest stints in several Australian television shows, including Neighbours as Kim White, Blue Heelers, Stingers, and McLeod's Daughters as Tom Braiden.

He had roles in feature films Everynight ... Everynight (1994), Blabbermouth & Stickybeak (1998), Redball (1999), A Telephone Call for Genevieve Snow and Mallboy (2001).

Richardson starred in the 2002 Australian crime film The Hard Word, alongside Guy Pearce and Joel Edgerton. He plays Mal Twentyman, one of three bank-robbing brothers. Pearce recommended Richardson to director Scott Roberts, after they worked together in a play two years earlier. Richardson followed his role in The Hard Word with a part in the comedy-thriller Horseplay.

Richardson played Detective Matt Ryan in the Seven Network crime drama City Homicide from 2007 until the show's cancellation in 2011. He initially played a minor role in the unaired pilot, but he proved popular with the test audience and he was asked to attend a screen test for the main cast, where he received the role of Matt. He also appeared in writer/director Matthew Saville's drama film Noise (2007), followed by Dee McLachlan's drama film The Jammed (2007), and Eric Manchester's suspense film Torn (2010).

In 2012, Richardson guested in an episode of the ABC comedy series Lowdown. He also appeared in the television film Fatal Honeymoon alongside Harvey Keitel, Billy Miller and Gary Sweet. From 2012, he appeared as lawyer Drew Greer in the Jack Irish television films and the 2016 television series.

In 2014, Richardson re-joined the cast of Neighbours in the recurring role of Gary Canning. He reprised the role the following year and returned in 2016 as part of the main cast.

Richardson has made guest appearances as Detective Michael Mears in Wentworth, and Gary Riles in Nowhere Boys. He left Neighbours in March 2020 after his character was killed off.

== Awards ==
Richardson and co-writer Luke Elliot won the Best New Comedy-Drama award at the Melbourne Fringe for The Belly Of The Whale.

For his role of Ken, a stalker, in The Secret Life of Us, Richardson received a nomination for Best Actor in a Supporting or Guest Role in a Television Drama or Comedy at the 2003 Australian Film Institute Awards.

== Political career and controversies ==
Richardson made the decision to quit acting in 2021 and announced he would pursue a political career and stand as an independent candidate for the Australian Senate in the 2022 Australian federal election. He later stood in the 2022 Victorian state election representing the far-right Freedom Party of Victoria. He got 1.09% in Northern Metropolitan Region.

In 2023 during a rally which was attended by Liberal MP Renee Heath, Richardson spoke of standing up to the process of deracinating who we are as Australians. The meaning of "deracinate" in this sense is to remove the racial or ethnic characteristics or influences of a place. He also spoke of New World Order and Globalists.

In 2024 Richardson founded a far-right group called National Workers Alliance (NWA). The NWA describes itself as an "Australian Nationalist Organisation for the preservation of western culture and identity". Deakin University researcher Gerard Gill called the emergence of the group as "arguably the most defined and deliberate far-right turn for Australian conspiracism". On 14 September 2024 the group met with various other far-right, white supremacist, and neo-Nazi identities such as Thomas Sewell, Blair Cottrell, and members of the National Socialist Network at an event in Melbourne to discuss "advocating for the rights of people of European descent". In November 2024, Victoria Police investigated Richardson after a film from a NWA gathering in September showed him raising his arm in a Nazi salute, which is banned in the state.

Richardson was charged with the offence and in 2025 asked to be spared a criminal conviction. In November 2025, Richardson was found guilty of performing the salute.

== Other activities ==
Richardson led an anti-vaccination protest in Melbourne in 2021.

== Personal life ==
Richardson was married to Nicole Riches, a writer. They have three children and lived in Melbourne. In December 2016, it was announced that Richardson had separated from his wife and was dating radio presenter Fifi Box. Box and Richardson separated in 2018.

He attends a Baptist church and has written for Christian conservative website Caldron Pool.

== Filmography ==
=== Film ===
Year	Title	Role	Notes
1994	Everynight ... Everynight	Greer	
1998	Blabbermouth & Stickybeak	Andy Peck	
1999	Redball	Detective Rix Dixsarcos	
2000	A Telephone Call for Genevieve Snow	Nigel	
2001	Mallboy	Security Guard	
2002	The Hard Word	Mal Twentyman	
2003	Horseplay	Gilles	
2007	The Jammed	Federal Agent Mollica	
2007	Noise	Matty Rhodes	
2007	Rogue	Collin	
2010	Torn	Daniel	
2012	Fatal Honeymoon	Detective Robertson	
2016	Nowhere Boys: The Book of Shadows	Gary Riles	

=== Television ===
Year	Title	Role	Notes
1992	Neighbours	Kim White	Guest role
1993	The Feds: Abduction	Kev	
1995	Blue Heelers	Jason Wallace	Episode: "Heavy Traffic"
1999	Stingers	Mooney	Episode: "Nothing Personal"
2000	Stingers	Christian Reagan	Episode: "HeartLine"
2001	Blue Heelers	Graham Roach	Episode: "On the Run"
2002	Stingers	Theo Bolton	Episode: "Slow Hand, Easy Touch"
2003	The Secret Life of Us	Ken	
2004	Blue Heelers	Cal Milic	
2006	McLeod's Daughters	Tom Braiden	
2007–2011	City Homicide	Matt Ryan	Main cast
2007	Wilfred	Hank	Episode: "Barking Behind Bars"
2011	Small Time Gangster	Sandy	Episode: "The Last Post"
2012	Jack Irish: Black Tide	Drew Greer	TV movie
2012	Jack Irish: Bad Debts	Drew Greer	TV movie
2012	Lowdown	Ryan Hamilton	Episode: "Hack in Business"
2012	Conspiracy 365	Nelson Sharkey	Recurring role
2013–2015	Nowhere Boys	Gary Riles/Sergeant Riles	Recurring role
2014	Jack Irish: Dead Point	Drew Greer	TV movie
2014–2020	Neighbours	Gary Canning	Main cast
2015	Wentworth	Detective Michael Mears	Recurring role
2015	House Husbands	Steve	Episode: "4x6"
2016	The Doctor Blake Mysteries	Terrence Noonan	Episode: "Against the Odds"
2016–2021	Jack Irish	Drew Greer	Main cast
2016	Neighbours: Summer Stories	Gary Canning	Webseries
2017	Neighbours vs Time Travel	Gary Canning	Webseries
2020	Mint Condition	Guy	TV series
