= Neil Pigot =

Australian actor

- Born: Neil Pigot; Melbourne, Victoria, Australia
- Occupation: Actor
- Known for: Blue Heelers
- Spouse(s): Rachel Mackie (b. 2001 – div. 2016)

Neil Pigot is an Australian film, television, and stage actor. He is perhaps best known for his role as Inspector Falcon Price in the television series Blue Heelers. He has presented several documentaries on his niche subject, Australian military history. He is also the author of several works of non-fiction.

== Early life and education ==
Neil Pigot was born in Melbourne, the eldest son of a butcher turned commercial pilot, and his wife who would become one of Australia's pioneering female car sales people. At age 8, his family moved to Darwin and then South East Asia. He completed his schooling in Sydney. He then left his "dysfunctional family home" at the age of 17.

== Career ==
Pigot began work with the semi-professional Lieder Southern Regional Theatre in Goulburn, New South Wales, in the early 1980s, first appearing as Meriman the butler in Wilde's The Importance of Being Earnest. He then worked in community theatre and on drama programmes with long term institutionalised adults at Kenmore Psychiatric Hospital, before joining Theatre ACT in 1984. After a time as a contract actor in Canberra, he established the Black Inc theatre company with Paul Corcoran, Tim Ferguson, and Ian Hagan. He performed at a late night cabaret, The Katt Klub, with many artists including the Doug Anthony Allstars.

He has played leading roles for all of Australia's major companies, including the Melbourne and Sydney Theatre Companies, Belvoir, Playbox/Malthouse, Queensland Theatre Company, and State Theatre Company of South Australia and also leading independent companies Brink.

Pigot's television credits include leading guest roles in over 20 television series and several telemovies, beginning with G.P. in the 1980s. Notable series include The Man from Snowy River, The Games, The Adventures of Lano and Woodley, The Secret Life of Us, Laid, Marshall Law, Wicked Science, Stingers, Miss Fisher's Murder Mysteries, Neighbours, Society Murders and The Doctor Blake Mysteries. For nine years he performed the role of Inspector Falcon Price on the drama series Blue Heelers, for which he is best known.

Pigot featured in a number of Australian films, including Head On, Lucky Country, Red Dog, The Dish, Oranges and Sunshine and Blessed.

Pigot is also a documentary writer and presenter who specialises in Australian military history.

In 1994, he completed his first work of non-fiction, The Changi Diary. He also recorded an album The Changi Songbook, a compilation of original songs written by an Australian POW in a Changi POW Camp with the remaining members of the Changi Concert Party in that same year. A live album of the songs was recorded during two concerts at the Melbourne Recital Centre in 2013.

== Personal life ==
Pigot lived and worked in many Australian cities and in the UK, before returning to the place of his birth in 1995.

In 2001 he married his longtime partner Rachel Mackie, an academic. The couple divorced in 2016. He later remarried and was living in Broken Hill in 2023.

Pigot has been open about suffering from Bipolar disorder, depression, anxiety, and alcoholism, and having attempted suicide. He spent time in mental and rehab facilities for treatment in 2016.

== Filmography ==
=== Film ===
Year	Title	Role	Notes
1998	Head On	Senior Constable	
1999	Redball	Bingo Wright	
2000	The Dish	Journo	
2001	Like It Is	Narrator	Short film
2007	The Condemned	Wade	
2009	Blessed	Sergeant Kerrick	
2009	Dark Frontier	Carver	
2010	Oranges and Sunshine	James	
2011	Red Dog	Vet	
2017	Pillars	Richard	Short film
2017	Mrs McCutcheon	Parncut	Short film
2017	Australia Day	Michael Bester	
2020	Strangers to the World	Bishop	
2021	Some Happy Day	Radio Announcer	
2022	Slant	Martin	
TBA	Stringybark	John Kelly	

=== Television ===
Year	Title	Role	Notes
1990	Home and Away	Electrician	1 episode
1991	The Girl from Tomorrow	Cameraman	
1994	G.P.	Dave	1 episode
1996	Snowy River: The Mcgregor Saga	Ambrose Wylie	1 episode
1997	State Coroner	Senior Constable	1 episode
1997	The Last of the Ryans	Speed	TV movie
1997–1999	The Adventures of Lano and Woodley	Sgt Pearce	3 episodes
1997–2006	Blue Heelers	Russell Falcon-Price	42 episodes
1998	The Games	David Pigot	1 episode
2000	Stepsister from Planet Weird	Fred Larson	TV movie
2001	The Secret Life of Us	Mad Dog Martin	2 episodes
2002	Marshall Law	Brett	1 episode
2003	Stingers	Barry Hunter	1 episode
2005	Wicked Science	Earl	1 episode
2006	The Society Murders	DS Steve Waddell	TV movie
2007	Neighbours	Christian Johnson	7 episodes
2009	For Valour	Narrator	Documentary
2009	Rush	Eddie	1 episode
2011	The Digger	Narrator	Documentary
2012	Miss Fisher's Murder Mysteries	Ted Coglan	1 episode
2012	Laid	Hilary	1 episode
2013	Breaker Morant	Narrator	Documentary
2013–2016	The Doctor Blake Mysteries	Derek Alderton	5 episodes
2016	Secret City	Brian Huxley	3 episodes
2016	The Kettering Incident	Dominic Harrold	8 episodes
2018	Back In Very Small Business	Radio Talkback Host	1 episode
2021	Total Control	Stephen	1 episode

== Theatre ==
=== As actor ===
Year	Title	Role	Notes
Early 1980s	The Importance of Being Earnest	Meriman the Butler	Lieder Southern Regional Theatre, Goulburn
1985	Picnic on the Battlefield / Orison / Fando and Lis		Gorman House, Canberra with Australian Theatre Workshop
1985	Two Gentlemen of Verona / The Private Ear		Gorman House, Canberra with Black Inc
1985	No. 3		Rehearsal Room, Civic Square, Canberra with Red Square Theatre
1985	Joseph and the Amazing Technicolor Dreamcoat		ANU, Canberra with Black Inc
1986	The Lover		Rehearsal Room, Civic Square, Canberra with Black Inc
1986	Bedroom Farce		Playhouse, Canberra with Canberra Comedy Theatre Co.
1986	Ubu Roi		Australian National Gallery Theatre, Canberra
1988	Naked		Childers Street Theatre, Canberra with Black Inc
1992–1993; 1995	A Bright and Crimson Flower		Princes Wharf, Hobart, Launceston Showgrounds Motor Pavilion, HMAS Lonsdale, Melbourne, Echuca, Hamilton, Thebarton Theatre, Adelaide, Bendigo, Mt Nelson Theatre, Hobart with Zootango Theatre Company
1993	As You Like It	Duke Frederick / Silvius / Forrester	Royal Tasmanian Botanical Gardens, Hobart with Zootango Theatre Company
1995	The Ship That Never Was		Polly Woodside, Melbourne, with Round Earth Theatre Company
1996	Travesties	Henry Carr	Melbourne Athenaeum with Black Inc
1996	Mad, Bad and Dangerous to Know	Lord Byron	Melbourne Athenaeum with Black Inc
1996	The Truth Game		Carlton Courthouse with Missing Link Productions
1997	Ned Kelly		Theatre Works, Melbourne, with Kickhouse Theatre
1998	Judgement	Captain Vukhov	Carlton Courthouse, Melbourne
1999	The Boneyard		La Mama, Melbourne
1999	Fred	Barry / Egyptian Man	Fairfax Studio, Melbourne with MTC
2001	Crave		Belvoir St Theatre, Sydney
2002	Uncle Bob	Uncle Bob	Red Stitch Actors Theatre, Melbourne
2002	The Fortunes of Richard Mahony	Richard Mahony	Brisbane Powerhouse, Malthouse Theatre, Melbourne with Playbox Theatre Company & QTC
2002	Rapture	Tom	Malthouse Theatre, Melbourne with Playbox Theatre Company
2003	Breath By Breath		Carlton Courthouse, Melbourne with La Mama
2003	The Country	Richard	Belvoir St Theatre, Sydney
2004	Traitors	Krasin, an Army officer	Carlton Courthouse, Melbourne with La Mama
2004	Dinner	Lars	Fairfax Studio, Melbourne with MTC
2005	Weary - the Story of Sir Edward Dunlop	Weary Dunlop	Australian tour with McPherson Touring
2005	Oleanna		The Butter Factory Theatre, Wodonga with HotHouse Theatre
2006	A Single Act	Neil	Malthouse Theatre, Melbourne with MTC
2007	Heaven		Trades Hall, Melbourne with theatre@risk
2007	Evidence		Trades Hall, Melbourne, with theatre@risk
2007	Hamlyn		Trades Hall, Melbourne, with theatre@risk
2007	Black Box 149		Trades Hall, Melbourne, with theatre@risk
2007; 2008	Thom Pain (based on nothing)	Thom Pain	Malthouse Theatre, Melbourne, Street 2, Acton, Canberra with MTC
2008	Frost/Nixon		Fairfax Studio, Melbourne with MTC
2008	The Lower Depths		Fortyfivedownstairs, Melbourne with Ariette Taylor Productions
2008–2010	When the Rain Stops Falling	Gabriel York	Australian tour with Brink Productions, STCSA, STC & QTC
2009	Flashpoint: Big Noise / Topsy / Whiteley's Incredible Blue		Fortyfivedownstairs, Melbourne
2011	Song of the Bleeding Throat	Abraham Lincoln	The Eleventh Hour Theatre, Melbourne
2011	Whiteley's Incredible Blue ... an hallucination	Brett Whiteley	Fortyfivedownstairs for Melbourne International Arts Festival
2017	The Realistic Joneses	Bob	Red Stitch Actors Theatre
2019	The Tree of Man		Old Treasury Building, Melbourne with Stork Theatre
2023	Green Time & Tempo		Malthouse Theatre, Melbourne
2023	Good Works	Alan / Brother Clement / Barry / Mr Donovan	Mill Theatre, Canberra
2024	Terror	Christian Lauterbach	Mill Theatre, Canberra

=== As crew ===
Year	Title	Role	Notes
1985	Rosencrantz and Guildenstern Are Dead	Lighting Designer	Theatre 3, Acton, Canberra with Black Inc
1985	Jacques Brel is Alive and Well and Living in Paris	Assistant Director	Gorman House, Canberra with Black Inc
1985	Private Lives	Lighting Designer	Theatre 3, Acton with Canberra Repertory Society
1986	After Magritte	Publicist	Rehearsal Room, Civic Square, Canberra with Black Inc & Canberra Theatre Trust
