= Richard Wolstencroft =

Australian director and film festival organizer

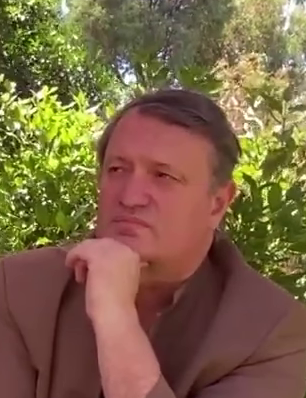
- Wolstencroft in 2022
- Born: April 23, 1969 (age 57); Melbourne, Australia
- Other name: Richard Masters
- Occupation: Film director

Richard Wolstencroft (born April 23, 1969) is an Australian filmmaker and director of the Melbourne Underground Film Festival or MUFF. Wolstencroft also founded the Melbourne BDSM venue Hellfire Club under the pseudonym 'Richard Masters.'

== Career ==
Wolstencroft's film career began in 1992, with the premier of his directorial debut, the vampire film Bloodlust, which he co-directed with Jon Hewitt. In the same year, Wolstencroft opened Hellfire Club, the only BDSM and kink venue operating in Melbourne for the greater part of the 1990s.

In 1999, Wolstencroft released his second feature film Pearls Before Swine which starred industrial musician and alleged neo-Nazi Boyd Rice. The rejection of that film by Melbourne International Film Festival prompted Wolstencroft to start the Melbourne Underground Film Festival as an outlet "dedicated to alternative, exploitation, genre and political cinema" in 2000.

Wolstencroft directed and released three other feature-length projects, The Beautiful and Damned in 2008, The Second Coming in 2015, and The Second Coming: Volume 2 in 2016.

Wolstencroft continues to serve as director of the MUFF as of 2022.

== Controversy & legal issues ==
Wolstencroft's first film-related legal issue came in 2001, when MUFF was forced to cancel a screening of Salò, or the 120 Days of Sodom due to being unable to obtain permission from the Australian Classification Board to screen the film.

In 2003, Wolstencroft scheduled a screening of a lecture by noted Holocaust denier David Irving as part of the annual MUFF programming. Although Australian Jewish groups failed to secure a court injunction to prevent the screening, the recording was pulled from the MUFF schedule by Wolstencroft hours before it was slated to be shown.

In 2010, Wolstencroft organized an illegal screening of the film L.A. Zombie. After being brought to trial for the illegal screening, Wolstencroft was ultimately ordered by the Melbourne Magistrates' Court to pay $750 to the Royal Children’s Hospital, although the screening was eligible for penalties as severe as a $20,000 fine and up to two years in prison. After the screening took place, Wolstencroft's home was raided by Australian police.

In 2017, Wolstencroft uploaded a post to Facebook negatively reacting to Australia's marriage equality vote, claiming that "[h]omosexuality is created often by child abuse" and that "[t]he Australian public really was fooled, bullied and cajoled in to [sic] this decision ruthlessly by the Government and Media Elite." An ensuing backlash led to Wolstencroft publicly apologizing for the post and implying he would resign as director of the MUFF, only to return to the festival in his original position the following year.

== Critical reception ==
After release, Bloodlust was reviewed in Australian film magazine Cinema Papers by critic Karl Quinn, who described the movie as "appalling, plot-less, badly directed, scripted and acted."

Mark David Ryan, an associate professor of film and screen at the Queensland University of Technology, described Wolstencroft as a "key [figure] in 2000s horror production" and described Bloodlust as "one of the more renowned underground horrors of the decade."

Critic Adrian Martin described Pearls Before Swine as "grandly pretentious" and "an incoherent, idiotic, excruciatingly bad film that revels in the kind of fascism espoused by naughty schoolboys."

Wolstencroft's documentary The Last Days of Joe Blow was reviewed by SBS film critic Simon Foster, who awarded the film a three-and-a-half-star rating and described the film as both "[a] jittery, impulsive work" and "a revealing, incisive account of a man at the crossroads."

== Politics ==
Wolstencroft supported the Sex Party in the 2010 Victorian state elections, speaking at a launch event for the party. Although describing his personal politics as "a mix of Left and Right ideas", he has expressed support for the Alt-right and Donald Trump, and he has self-described as a "transcendental fascist" and an "Australian Milo Yiannopoulos".

In 2010, Wolstencroft published a blog post that stated that "[the] Nazis only wanted a united Europe like the EU," and that "Hitler would have protected the British Empire and it would exist in a greater glory to this day if he had been allowed to". These statements have been interpreted by some as expressing sympathy towards Nazism.

== Filmography ==
- Bloodlust
- The Intruder
- Pearls Before Swine
- The Beautiful and Damned
- The Last Days of Joe Blow
- The Second Coming
- The Second Coming (Vol. 2)
- The Debt Collector
