= Billie Rose Prichard =

Australian actress and musician

- Occupation: Actress
- Years active: 1999–present
- Known for: Monkey Puzzle (2008)
- Notable work: The Dark Room (2011)

Billie Rose Prichard is an Australian actress on stage and screen, and a hip-hop musician. She was nominated for Best Supporting Actress at the 2011 Sydney Theatre Awards.

== Career ==
=== Film and television ===
Prichard has appeared on film and television since 1999, with guest roles in several Australian TV series including Wildside, Water Rats, The Secret Life of Us, Young Lions and All Saints.

In 2006, Prichard appeared opposite Richard Roxburgh and Essie Davis in the made-for-television film The Silence. That same year, she had a role in TV film Small Claims: The Reunion, with Claudia Karvan and Rebecca Gibney.

In 2008, Prichard appeared as one of five friends who venture into the remote area of the Blue Mountains in the feature film Monkey Puzzle, alongside Ryan Johnson and Ella Scott Lynch. It was later released in the US as Enter the Wild (2018).

In 2011, Prichard played Rose in the thriller feature X: Night of Vengeance.

=== Theatre ===
Prichard's stage roles have attracted critical acclaim. In 2006, she played the young daughter of a titled lady in pre-Federation northern Queensland in Constance Drinkwater. A reviewer wrote "Prichard [and the actor playing her sister] work with great rapport to create characters that defy easy description. Nine-year-olds who have glimpsed the 20th century and know how it ends, who commune with spirits and wrestle with men, are made coherent and nuanced by these talented young actors."

In 2011, Prichard appeared a Belvoir St Theatre production of The Dark Room, with critics writing "Billie Rose Pritchard is electric as the adolescent, very much on the edge"; "Billie Rose Prichard is superb as the bruised and troubled Grace: sullenly uncommunicative, aggressively defiant, but then suddenly sometimes heart-achingly vulnerable." She was nominated for Best Supporting Actress in the 2011 Sydney Theatre Awards for her performance in the role.

In 2018, Prichard appeared in The Hayes Theatre's revival of the musical Darlinghurst Nights. One reviewer commented "Cora, an ex-hooker [was] luminously played by the stunning Billie Rose Prichard".

=== Music ===
As Billie Rose, Prichard is the vocalist with hip-hop group The Daily Meds. The group released their debut album Happy Daze, followed in 2014 by an album titled Sour Milk. A reviewer said about Sour Milk: "Vocalist Billie Rose seamlessly complements the hard hitting nature of the record without coming across as passive. For Rose there is no hiding behind a big beat or wailing in the background, it’s her straight up, candid choruses that cut the album up and give it different dimensions".

== Filmography ==
=== Film ===
Year	Title	Role	Notes	Ref.
1999	Me, Myself, I	Self Defence Girl		
2008	Monkey Puzzle (aka Enter the Wild)	Toni		
2011	X: Night of Vengeance	Rose		
2013	The Egg		Short film	
2013	Justin Beaver: Love Bytes	Jade	Short film	
2013	Herpes of the Lips: Love Bytes	Jade	Short film	
2014	Midnight Poetry		Short film	
2015	Skin Deep	Annie		

=== Television ===
Year	Title	Role	Notes	Ref.
1999	Wildside	Nadia Stanescu	Season 2, episode 7	
2000	Water Rats	Miranda Wenzel	Season 5, episode 24	
2002	Young Lions	Lisa Carlisle	Season 1, episode 6	
2003	The Secret Life of Us	Julia	Season 3, episode 14	
2003	All Saints	Erica	Season 6, episode 41	
2006	The Silence	Surry Hill Girl	TV film	
2006	Small Claims: The Reunion	Judi	TV film	

== Theatre ==
Year	Title	Role	Notes	Ref.
2004	A Midsummer Night's Dream		Belvoir, Sydney	
2006	Constance Drinkwater and the final days of Somerset	Fortitude	Stables Theatre, Sydney with Griffin Theatre Company & Tamara Rock Surfers	
2011	The Dark Room	Grace	Belvoir, Sydney	
2013	Empire: Terror on the High Seas	Poppy Mitchell	Bondi Pavilion, Sydney with Tamarama Rock Surfers	
2018	Darlinghurst Nights	Cora	Hayes Theatre Co, Sydney	
2022	The Sirens' Return	Singer	Port Kembla Pool with Merrigong Theatre Company	

== Awards and nominations ==
Year	Work	Award	Category	Result	Ref.
2011	The Dark Room	Sydney Theatre Awards	Best Actress in a Supporting Role of a Mainstage Production	Nominated	
2012	Happy Daze (with Daily Meds)	Australian Music Prize	Best Album	Finalist	
