= Turkey Shoot (1982 film) =

1982 Australian film by Brian Trenchard-Smith

- Theatrical release poster
- Directed by: Brian Trenchard-Smith
- Screenplay by: Jon George; Neill D. Hicks (Note: Throughout principal photography and post-production, Trenchard-Smith reworked parts of the script without receiving a credit.)
- Story by: George Schenck; Robert Williams; David Lawrence
- Produced by: Antony I. Ginnane; William Fayman
- Starring: Steve Railsback; Olivia Hussey; Michael Craig; Noel Ferrier; Carmen Duncan; Roger Ward; Lynda Stoner
- Cinematography: John R. McLean
- Edited by: Alan Lake
- Music by: Brian May
- Production companies: Hemdale; FGH; Filmco
- Distributed by: Roadshow Film Distributors
- Release date: 14 October 1982
- Running time: 93 minutes
- Country: Australia
- Language: English
- Budget: A$2.5 million
- Box office: A$321,000 (Australia)

Turkey Shoot (originally released in the US as Escape 2000 and also known in the UK as Blood Camp Thatcher) is a 1982 Australian dystopian action film directed by Brian Trenchard-Smith. Its ensemble cast—an eclectic mix of international stars, Australian soap opera veterans and character actors—is led by Steve Railsback, Olivia Hussey, Michael Craig, Noel Ferrier, Carmen Duncan, Roger Ward and Lynda Stoner. The film marks the first of three directorial collaborations between Trenchard-Smith and producer Antony I. Ginnane—the others being The Siege of Firebase Gloria (1989) and Arctic Blast (2010)—although the director had previously made promotional reels and trailers for Ginnane's earlier films.

Described by the director as a cross-genre piece in which "1984 meets The Camp on Blood Island where they play 'The Most Dangerous Game'", the film depicts a concentration camp in a totalitarian society which allows rich adventurers to participate in human hunting games with its "deviant" convicts. Its story follows a political activist (Railsback) and an innocent prisoner (Hussey) as they work together to survive one such game and turn the tables on their oppressors.

Filmed on location near Cairns, Turkey Shoot underwent a troubled production as a result of a budgetary shortfall that reduced the shooting schedule; this also necessitated multiple scenes being rewritten or cut entirely, extensive simultaneous second unit photography directed by executive producer David Hemmings, and use of stock footage during post-production. Widely considered to be a seminal example of the Ozploitation cycle, the film is notable for its extreme depictions of graphic violence and sadism; Time Out declared that the film "makes modern day grindhouse imitations such as Machete and Planet Terror seem like anaemic shadows in comparison". Despite receiving negative reviews from such Australian critics as David Stratton and Phillip Adams, Turkey Shoot is recognised as a cult film, has been championed by Quentin Tarantino, and was prominently featured in the documentary Not Quite Hollywood: The Wild, Untold Story of Ozploitation! (2008).

A remake, directed by Jon Hewitt, produced by Ginnane, executive produced by Trenchard-Smith, and starring Dominic Purcell and Viva Bianca, was released in 2014.

== Plot ==
Set in the then-future year of 1995, a totalitarian regime rules over the entire world and so-called "social deviants" are sent to mass prison camps for re-education and behaviour modification. The new arrivals at Camp 47 are Chris Walters, an innocent shopkeeper arrested when trying to help a rebel who was chased into her store and beaten by the police; Rita Daniels, a suspected prostitute; and Paul Anders, a political dissident and pirate radio broadcaster who has escaped from several other camps. Camp Master Charles Thatcher subjects his wards to brutal, inhuman treatment; Chris barely avoids being raped by the sadistic guards Red and Ritter, and Paul is tortured for intervening. Their cellmates Griffin and Dodge separately plot escapes, but are unaware that their on-going attempts are surveyed by the guards. Ritter beats a petite woman prisoner to death on Thatcher's orders, and a male prisoner who tried to escape is forced to play a game of "football" where he pathetically races around leaking orbs full of gasoline while being beaten by the guards until Ritter sets the spilled gas on fire and burns the prisoner to death.

Every year, Thatcher and his circle of VIPs (portly Secretary Mallory, icy Jennifer, gleefully sadistic Tito, and Tito's beastly accomplice Alph) select five prisoners to be human prey in a "turkey shoot"; a deadly 12-hour hunt in which defenceless quarries are released into the nearby wilderness to be stalked and killed by the armed hunters. Paul, Chris, Rita, and Dodge are chosen to be the prey, told that they will be freed should they survive the time limit. Griffin is added to the group after starting a fight with Dodge in the dorms.

With a three-hour head start, the prisoners are sent out at half-hour intervals and quickly become separated. Dodge is the first to be caught, Alph breaking off and eating his little toe under Tito's instructions before chasing him down and killing him by beating him and breaking his spine. Thatcher toys with Paul by firing near-misses with a sniper rifle, forcing him to scale a difficult rock formation and preventing his scramble to find Chris. Paul manages to redirect Thatcher's pursuit by causing a rock slide, while Griffin jumps Red and takes his assault rifle, placing him in a trap that later kills him. He tries to mount a counterattack, but is pinned down by Jennifer and Thatcher and incapacitated with arrows before being run over and killed. Jennifer proceeds to stalk Rita on horseback, trapping her before raping and killing her.

Tito attempts to bisect Paul with the tractor shovel attached to the front of his buggy, Paul manages to get out of the way and Tito inadvertently kills Alph. Mallory and his guide, Chief Guard Ritter, track Chris through dense jungle into a sugarcane field. Ritter attempts to smoke her out by setting the field aflame, when Mallory stumbles into Chris. Before he can rape her, Paul jumps him and gets his gun, shooting him in the groin and escaping with Chris as he burns to death. The two run to what they think is the end of the wilderness, only to realise upon reaching coastline that they're on an island, and that there is no way out. Ritter catches up to them, but Chris cuts his hands off with his own machete and he bleeds to death. The two resolve to fight back, killing Tito and stealing his buggy. Armed with a mounted machine gun, they storm the camp and free the other prisoners.

The uprising leads to the RAAF scrambling a bomber to destroy the camp and quash the revolt. The prisoners raid an armoury for arms, fending off the guards while Chris destroys the communications centre and kills Jennifer by grabbing an explosive arrow and jamming it into her head, which then explodes. Thatcher attempts to lead a counter-attack, but is blown apart by machine-gun fire from Paul, and the prisoners flee into the jungle just as the camp is destroyed by a napalm airstrike. Armed with supplies, the now-rebels led by Paul and Chris make their way into the mountains.

== Cast ==
- Steve Railsback as Paul Anders, a political dissident who has already escaped from several re-education camps.
- Olivia Hussey as Chris Walters, a shopkeeper falsely accused of aiding a rebel.
- Michael Craig as Charles Thatcher, the tyrannical warden of Camp 47 and supervisor of the turkey shoot. He is armed with a Winchester Model 70 sniper rifle and drives a red buggy.
- Carmen Duncan as Jennifer, a depraved aristocrat armed with a crossbow. She rides a horse.
- Noel Ferrier as Secretary Mallory, the head of the government's re-education program and Thatcher's superior. He travels on foot and wields a poisoned dart gun.
- Lynda Stoner as Rita Daniels, a woman imprisoned on suspicion of prostitution.
- Roger Ward as Ritter, the camp's Chief Guard and Thatcher's second-in-command, covertly vying for his position. He acts as Mallory's guide and carries a Smith & Wesson Model 27 revolver.
- Michael Petrovitch as Tito, a violent sadist who holds a flirtatious rapport with Jennifer. He drives a buggy with an attached tractor shovel and carries a small arsenal of firearms, including an MP 40 submachine gun, an M72 LAW rocket launcher, a Colt Trooper revolver, and a Browning ANM2 machine gun.
- Gus Mercurio as Red, a lecherous guard and Ritter's right-hand man. He is armed with a whip and an L1A1 Self-Loading Rifle.
- Bill Young as Griffin, a long-time rebel who has previously escaped from several camps, placed in the turkey shoot after a confrontation with Dodge.
- John Ley as Dodge, a model prisoner who continuously sucks up to Ritter and Thatcher in hopes of an early release.
- Steve Rackman as Alph, a troglodytae-like man with cannibalistic tendencies, found by Tito in a carnival freak show and acting as his companion.
- John Godden as Andy, a prisoner who unsuccessfully attempts escape and is subsequently burned alive.
- Oriana Panozzo as Melinda, a female prisoner beaten to near-death by Ritter to make an example to others.
- Kerry Rossall as Officer arresting Chris (uncredited)

== Production ==
According to Brian Trenchard-Smith, the film was always meant to be a satire.

The original script was sort of like I Am a Fugitive From a Chain Gang meets "The Most Dangerous Game", with 70 pages of Chain Gang and "Most Dangerous Game" lasted about 35 pages. I didn't think that was good balance. Also it was set in the depression era Deep South. We had tax based financing in place on condition that it was supposed to be set in Australia. So I suggested we set it in the future, and make it more universal. We wanted to make a tongue in cheek but gutsy action movie with subtext about corporate fascism at the beginning of the Reagan era. (He had Australia frightened...Ronald Ray Gun cartoons were often spray painted on Sydney walls in 1981) So we hired Neill & Jon to redo it. Then of course, there were days when I was writing pages myself during the shooting.

Turkey Shoot was produced during the Australian film tax exemption scheme 10BA. Under 10BA film costs were subsidised by the Australian government, and directors tended to cast foreign leads in the hope of boosting success in Europe or the Americas.

The movie was shot in Far North Queensland near Cairns. According to Trenchard-Smith, the schedule was slashed from 44 days to 28 just prior to filming. David Hemmings was one of the executive producers and shot some second unit scenes, which Trenchard-Smith says caused some tension:

He did not think much of me. He knew that a Completion Guarantor had me waiting in the wings to take over an earlier film [Race for the Yankee Zephyr] Hemmings was directing if he continued to remain behind schedule. He was having an on again off again affair with a member of the cast. When he made fun of me in front of my wife and new born son once in the production office, I poured beer on his head. He was a little more careful with me after that.

Lynda Stoner had insisted on no nudity when she accepted the role, but when she arrived on set she found out she was required to do some. She objected, pressure was put on her, so she compromised and did a back shot but says she always regretted it. Olivia Hussey had a miserable time during filming, hating coming to work and being terrified of the Australian bush.

== Release ==
Turkey Shoot grossed $321,000 at the box office in Australia, which is equivalent to $984,110 in 2009 dollars.

The film was released theatrically in the United States by New World Pictures as Escape 2000 in October 1983. The MPA required New World to make huge edits to the film's graphic violence, gore and rape scenes to qualify for an R rating. New World tried to use a less-edited cut for distribution but the ratings board, irritated that some other films had been able to pull that two-step on them, threatened to ban the film from release entirely if the heavily edited R-rated cut wasn't solely used.

The film was released in the UK under the opportunistic title Blood Camp Thatcher referring to the cold camp commandant Charles Thatcher, rather than the then British Prime Minister.

The film was released on special edition DVD by Anchor Bay Entertainment, and an uncut blu-ray has been released by Severin Films.

=== 2008 Melbourne International Film Festival ===
Turkey Shoot featured in a Focus on Ozploitation collection of 1970s and 1980s Australian exploitation films, including Barry McKenzie Holds His Own, Dead End Drive-In and Razorback. These over-the-top B grade films were characterised by lashings of gratuitous sex, violence and fuel-injected muscle car mayhem which pushed the boundaries of audience taste to new limits.

== Reception ==
Joe Baltake, film critic for the Philadelphia Daily News, gave the film a negative review, describing it as a "vomitous offering" and "unfit for human consumption". Bill O'Connor from the Arkon Beacon Journal called the film "garbage" and highlighted the excessive use of gore and the "wooden acting". Australian film critic David Stratton also condemned the film as "a catalogue of sickening horrors", adding that "the actors involved should have been ashamed for appearing in such trash".

Filmink magazine said "versions of the classic story Most Dangerous Game appear at least once a decade...This was Australia’s 10BA version directed with great pace by Brian Trenchard-Smith and featuring an excellent cast and perhaps Australian cinema's most notable werewolf."

== Legacy ==
A remake of Turkey Shoot was released in 2014. It was directed by Jon Hewitt and also produced by Antony I. Ginnane, with Trenchard-Smith serving as executive producer.

Olivia Hussey mentions shooting this film in her 2018 autobiography The Girl on the Balcony.

== See also ==
- Cinema of Australia
