= Society Murders =

Familicide in Melbourne, Australia

Melbourne Society Murders
- Date: 4 April 2002
- Location: Melbourne, Victoria, Australia
- Type: Familicide
- Cause: Death by strangulation
- Deaths: Margaret Mary Wales-King; Paul Aloysius King
- Convicted: 1. Matthew Wales; 2. Maritza Wales
- Convictions: 1. Murder ×2; 2. Attempting to pervert the course of justice
- Sentence: 1. 30 years' imprisonment with a non-parole period of 24 years 2. Two-year suspended sentence

The Society Murders is the name given to the 4 April 2002 parricide of husband and wife millionaire socialites Margaret Mary Wales-King, 69, and husband, Paul Aloysius King, 75, in Melbourne, Victoria, Australia, by Wales-King's 34-year-old son, Matthew Robert Wales. News media throughout Australia covered the crime and subsequent trial, which later became the subject of a book and a television film.

== Double murder ==
On 4 April 2002, the victims, Margaret Wales-King and her second husband, Paul King, attended the Glen Iris home of Wales-King's youngest son Matthew Wales, a former hairdresser, and his Chilean-born wife Maritza Wales for dinner. That evening, Wales made, then drugged, their vegetable soup with crushed tablets stolen from his mother to make them drowsy.

He then killed his mother and stepfather as they left the house by clubbing them to the back of the neck. After hiding the bodies in the front yard he then abandoned their car in Middle Park. After renting a trailer with his credit card, he wrapped them in doona covers and hid the bodies in his garage for two days. While searching for a bush burial site, he purchased a map and petrol on his credit card too.

The couple was initially reported missing to Malvern Police by Wales-King's daughter on 8 April, and on 10 April, their vehicle was found. On 29 April, park rangers discovered the shallow grave in bushland near Marysville, Victoria. The two were buried one on top of the other with King lain above Wales-King. Autopsies indicated that the couple had been clubbed and also strangled.

=== Confession and arrest ===
Wales's erratic behaviour drew the attention of both his family and investigators, especially given that he did not initially mention to his family that the couple had visited him the night they disappeared. On 11 May, after confessing to police, Wales was charged with the murders. He mentioned burying his mother lower than his stepfather in order to diminish her domineering character. He also told police that King was killed because "he blamed him for his parents' separation". His wife was charged with being an accessory after the fact to both the alleged murders. Wales had participated at the couple's funeral just three days earlier (seated away from his four older siblings) and was photographed weeping and embracing his elder brother.

=== Trial ===
At the Victorian Supreme Court, Wales pleaded guilty and was convicted of the murders. He was sentenced to 30 years' imprisonment with a non-parole period of 24 years. The trial judge found Wales, partly due to his low IQ, murdered the couple because he resented his mother, particularly when using her wealth to manipulate him. His wife pleaded guilty to attempting to pervert the course of justice and received a two-year suspended sentence. She was found not to have played any part in the actual murders.

== In popular culture ==
=== Book ===
In 2003, Melbourne barrister Hilary Bonney wrote a book about the murder, The Society Murders: The True Story of the Wales-King Murders. The book was written without co-operation from the Wales-King family and was based largely on court evidence and police documents.

=== Television film ===
The book was later adapted as a 2006 television film, The Society Murders for Network Ten, written by Greg Haddrick and Kylie Needham for the production company Screentime.

==== Cast ====
- Georgie Parker as Emma Connell
- Alex Dimitriades as Robert Nazaretian
- Matthew Le Nevez as Matthew Wales
- Nicholas Eadie as Damian Wales
- Daniela Farinacci as Maritza Wales
- Asher Keddie as Prue Reed
- Terry Norris as Paul King
- Julia Blake as Margaret Wales-King
- Heather Mitchell as Sally Honan
- Mark Raffety as Damian Honan
- Neil Pigot as DS Steve Waddell
- Robert Menzies as Paul Gallbally
- Robert Grubb as Phil Dunn QC

=== Documentary episode ===
The story was also examined on the episode "The Enemy Within" of the series Behind Mansion Walls presented on Investigation Discovery.

== See also ==
- List of Caulfield Grammar School people
