= Ben Ellis (playwright) =

Australian playwright

Ben Ellis is a playwright from Gippsland in Australia, now based in both London and Melbourne. His significant works include Post Felicity (2001), Falling Petals (2002), a stage adaptation of Franz Kafka's The Metamorphosis (2005), and more recently Poet No. 7 (2006) and The Final Shot (Theatre503, 2007), both premiering in London. The Final Shot, about the television broadcast of a man's death, featured Susannah York. His latest play, The Captive, explores the folklore surrounding the supposed capture of a white woman by aboriginal people in East Gippsland.

Ellis' short play about the death of activist Rachel Corrie, Blindingly obvious facts, was directed by Matt Scholten and was featured in the 2007 Melbourne Top 30 season of the Short and Sweet short play competition.

NIDA commissioned Story of the Red Mountains for a 2012 production at Carriageworks, Sydney, and is a 12 character piece centred on a secretive gathering of Communist Party of Australia members on the night of the 1951 referendum to outlaw communism in Australia.

Rupert Goold and Robert Icke directed his work in the multi-authored Headlong project, Decade, at St Katherine's Docks, London, 2011, alongside work by writers including Simon Schama, Mike Bartlett, Amy Steel and Ella Hickson, dealing with the culture of the aftermath of the September 11 attacks in New York.

His first professional play, Outpatients, produced at the Carlton Courthouse, La Mama, Melbourne, was a satire on the treatment of type one diabetes - which he was diagnosed with in 1979 - by the Victorian hospital system.

== Awards ==
Ellis was awarded the inaugural Malcolm Robertson Prize and the Patrick White Playwrights' Award for Post Felicity (the latter in 2000, before the play was produced, under the title Who Are You, Mr James?). He was also the recipient of the Wal Cherry Play of the Year Award in 2002 for Falling Petals.

An unproduced play, Eighty-Eight, was shortlisted for the 2008 Bruntwood Prize, Royal Exchange Theatre, Manchester
