= Life (1996 film) =

- Directed by: Lawrence Johnston
- Written by: Lawrence Johnston; John Brumpton
- Based on: It Ain't Rehabilitation It's Containment (play) by John Brumpton
- Produced by: Elisa Argenzio
- Starring: John Brumpton; David Tredinnick; Libby Tanner
- Cinematography: Mandy Walker
- Edited by: Bill Murphy
- Music by: John Clifford White
- Release date: 1996
- Running time: 85 minutes
- Country: Australia
- Language: English
- Box office: A$118,981 (Australia)

Life is a 1996 Australian film about life in a section of a prison reserved for those infected with HIV.

== Plot ==
Hot-tempered former nightclub bouncer, Des (John Brumpton), is a new prison inmate. He tests positive for AIDS, which he attributes to contracting from club stripper Sharon (Belinda McClory). He is sent to 'T2', the segregated HIV positive section, to help keep the virus at bay. His new cellmate Ralph (David Treddinick) is dying fairly quickly and blames a blood transfusion for his illness, while inmate Snakey (Robert Morgan) is watching his lover Jimmy slowly die.

The film explores the interactions between the afflicted patients of different backgrounds and ages, the emotional conflict regarding their unresolved pasts, and their fears about mortality and a future that may never come.

== Cast ==
- John Brumpton as Des
- David Tredinnick as Ralph
- Libby Tanner as Jane
- Robert Morgan as Snakey
- Belinda McClory as Sharon
- Noel Jordan as Timmy
- Ian Scott as Officer Berwick
- Luke Elliot as Wayne
- Jeff Kovski as Chooki
- Peta Doodson as Officer Amy
- Tony Nikolakopoulos as Prison Officer

== Background ==
John Brumpton (who also starred) co-wrote the film with Lawrence Johnston. It was based on Brumpton's play It Ain't Rehabilitation It's Containment, which was previously staged at Melbourne's La Mama in 1991, to sold out audiences.

== Accolades ==
Year	Recipient	Award	Category	Result	Ref.
1996	Life	1996 Toronto International Film Festival	International Critics' Prize	Won	
1996	Life	Cinemedia	Greg Tepper Award	Won	
1996	Life / John Brumpton	Australian Film Institute Awards	Best Adapted Screenplay	Nominated	
1996	John Brumpton	Australian Film Institute Awards	Best Actor in a Leading Role and	Nominated	
1996	Robert Morgan	Australian Film Institute Awards	Best Actor in a Supporting Role	Nominated	
1996	Life	Australian Film Institute Awards	Best Achievement in Editing	Nominated	
