= Matt Scholten =

Australian theatre director & writer

- Born: Melbourne, Victoria, Australia
- Occupations: Director; Producer; Writer; Teacher; Film Maker
- Website: mattscholten.com

Matt Scholten is an Australian theatre and film director, producer, writer and teacher. He is the Artistic Director & Creative Producer of independent theatre company If Theatre which was established in 2006.

== Career ==
Scholten studied Drama and English Literature at the University of Melbourne performing in student theatre productions and earning a Bachelor of Education in 1992. He went on to study directing and writing at the Australian Nouveau (Antill) Theatre and a career as a Drama Teacher.

In 2006 he was accepted into the Victorian College of the Arts where he studied directing under the tutelage of Richard Murphet, Jenny Kemp and then Head of the School of Drama Lindy Davies.

In 2007, If Theatre's debut production was A Slight Ache by Harold Pinter and was followed later that year by Three Short Plays by Jack Hibberd produced for the 40th Birthday La Mama Theatre.

Beginning in 2008, Scholten collaborated with playwright Daniel Keene on a theatre practice based primarily in Melbourne's western suburbs, launching The Dog Theatre in Footscray with a production of Keene's Half & Half.

In 2009, The Cove (eight short plays including four world premieres) was directed by Scholten and had three Green Room Award nominations for actors Majid Shokor, Jan Freidl and Bruce Myles. The Cove featured the following plays: Cafe Table, Somewhere in the Middle of the Night, To Whom It May Concern, A Glass of Twilight, The Morning After, A Death, Two Shanks and The First Train.

Scholten's production of Daniel Keene's The Nightwatchman starring Roger Oakley was part of Theatreworks' Selected Works programme in 2010 and also that year he was assistant director to Peter Evans at the Melbourne Theatre Company on Keene's debut there, Life Without Me.

If Theatre has commissioned and co-produced two further works written by Daniel Keene and directed by Scholten:

- 2011 Boxman (commissioned by Big West Festival 2011 and then presented by Regional Arts Victoria on a Victorian and NSW tour in 2013). Boxman was shortlisted for the Louis Esson Prize for Drama in the 2012 Victorian Premier's Literary Award.
- 2015 Mother a one-woman play written for Noni Hazlehurst which began a national tour at the Gasworks Theatre and was published by Currency Press.

For the Melbourne Theatre Company, Scholten has directed The Heretic written by Richard Bean featuring Noni Hazlehurst & Andrew McFarlane and directed readings of Rejkavijk by Paul Galloway and Daniel Keene's The Curtain with Helen Morse and Alex Menglet. He was assistant director to Julian Meyrick for the 2007 Hard Lines Play Readings season.

Other directorial works include:

- The Crucible by Arthur Miller
- Glengarry Glen Ross by David Mamet
- Mr. Kolpert by David Geislemann
- The Tempest by William Shakespeare
- Dying City by Christopher Shinn
- Europe by Michael Gow

Along with his extensive work directing plays by Keene, other new Australian work Scholten has directed includes:

- Blindingly Obvious Facts by Ben Ellis (playwright) for the 2007 Short and Sweet Festival
- Human Resources by Chris Aronsten
- Crossed by Chris Summers
- Black Box 149 by Rosemary Johns
- Here We All Are. Assembled by Kathryn Ash

Scholten is also a teacher of acting and directing, working at the Victorian College of the Arts from 2007 to 2014 as a Teaching Artist and Director and was Head of Acting and Head of Theatre Arts at Goulburn Ovens TAFE in Benalla from 2010 to 2014.

For television, in 2013 he completed a Directorial Attachment with Channel Seven on the television drama A Place to Call Home and in 2017 was Acting Coach on Magpie Pictures' Grace Beside Me.

In 2013, Scholten programmed the theatre season for Benalla Performing Arts Centre and in 2014 he was appointed as resident artistic director there, launching the theatre seasons in 2014 and 2015. At BPACC, Scholten wrote and directed the play The Drums of Time, developed an Australia Council for the Arts funded workshop programme for female regional playwrights and hosted the Victorian College of the Arts first FRISK! Festival.

In 2015, Scholten toured with the production of Mother throughout Victoria and Tasmania and then relocated to South East Queensland taking up a position lecturing and directing at the University of Southern Queensland in Toowoomba. At USQ his work included his adaptation of Lysistrata, Tartuffe by Moliere adapted by Justin Fleming, Spring Awakening by Frank Wedekind adapted by Jonathan Franzen and The House of Bernarda Alba by Federico García Lorca.

In 2016, Mother toured New South Wales and Queensland and was nominated for two Helpmann Awards for Best Performance by a Female Actor in a Play and Best Regional Touring Production.

Scholten was one of the keynote speakers at the 2016 Australasian Association for Theatre, Drama and Performance Studies (ADSA) Conference.

Mother was presented at Belvoir Street Theatre in early 2018 and was presented at QPAC in August 2018. Noni Hazlehurst won the 2019 Matilda Award for Best Female Actor in a Leading Role for Mother for the QPAC season.

The Campaign by Campion Decent, a verbatim play that dramatised the fight for gay law reform in Tasmania was produced and directed by Scholten premiering at Salamanca Arts Centre in October 2018 co-produced by If Theatre, Tasmanian Theatre Company & Blue Cow Theatre, winning the 2019 Best New Writing Award at the Tasmanian Theatre Awards. The development of The Campaign was supported by a Playwriting Australia grant.

Scholten is currently lecturing in acting and is a guest director at the Queensland Conservatorium Griffith University and at Queensland University of Technology.

His debut film as writer/director, a short documentary supported by Screen Australia and Network Ten called Belonging had its world premiere at the 2020 Queer Screen Film Festival as part of the Sydney Gay & Lesbian Mardi Gras and will be screened on TenPlay later in 2020.

Belonging screened at the 2020 Melbourne Queer Film Festival and won the Jury Prize for Best Documentary Short.

Mother was presented in early 2020 at Home of the Arts, Gold Coast and in an encore season at QPAC.
