= Monkey Puzzle (film) =

- Directed by: Mark Forstmann
- Written by: Mark Forstmann & Stephen Davis
- Produced by: Tamara Popper
- Starring: Ryan Johnson; Ella Scott Lynch; Ben Geurens
- Cinematography: Justine Kerrigan
- Edited by: Ken Sallows
- Music by: Amanda Brown
- Release dates: 29 February 2008 (Byron Bay Film Festival); 23 October 2008 (Australia)
- Running time: 90 mins
- Country: Australia
- Language: English
- Box office: A$3,236

Monkey Puzzle (also known as Enter the Wild) is a 2008 Australian feature film about a group of friends who get lost in the wilderness.

== Synopsis ==
Over the Easter long weekend, four friends, Dylan (Ryan Johnson), Carl (Ben Geurens), Pippa (Ella Scott Lynch) and Toni (Billie Rose Pritchard) are joined by their drug dealer, Zac (Socratis Otto) on an expedition to the Blue Mountains. They are determined to locate the Wollemi pine (more commonly known as the 'Monkey Puzzle'), a rare and ancient tree said to be hidden in a remote gully.

Meanwhile, Carl is in love with Pippa, while also troubled over the death of his brother Luke from eight years earlier. Dylan is secretly in a relationship with Pippa, which is being concealed from Carl.

Deep inside the dense rainforest gully, their trek takes a turn for the worse, becoming a fight for survival, when the group loses their map, their food gets eaten by wild animals, and tension mounts between the friends.

== Cast ==
- Ben Geurens as Carl
- Ryan Johnson as Dylan
- Ella Scott Lynch as Pippa
- Socratis Otto as Zac
- Billie Rose Prichard as Toni

== Production ==
The film was shot on location in the Blue Mountains, the first Australian feature film to do so. It was shot on Super16mm film and captured with available light only. The independent film was made without any government financial support.

The film took four years to reach the screen after writer-director Mark Forstmann scrapped plans to shoot in the snow country because of the cost involved.

=== The Wollemi Pine ===
The film builds on the mystery of the Wollemia nobilis, commonly known as the Wollemi Pine, a real life prehistoric tree, endemic to Australia, that was discovered in 1994 in the Blue Mountains, north-west of Sydney. A protected species, its precise whereabouts is shrouded in secrecy. According to scientists, the tree should have died out with the dinosaurs and as a result, it has developed a reputation as a ‘Holy Grail’.

== Release ==
The film was first screened internationally, at the Shanghai International Film Festival in China, Cork International Film Festival in Ireland and São Paulo International Film Festival in Brazil, as well as the Byron Bay Film Festival in its native Australia.

It was then screened as a limited Australian national release from 23 October 2008, with opening nights in Sydney, Melbourne and Katoomba (in the Blue Mountains), attended by writer/director Mark Forstmann for a Q&A session.

The film was much later released to streaming platforms in the US as Enter the Wild on 17 August 2018.

== Reception ==
Margaret Pomeranz and David Stratton, Australian film critics from the ABC's At the Movies, gave the film three stars and two and a half stars, respectively.

Bernard Hemingway from Cinephilia gave the film two and a half stars, saying: "Monkey Puzzle is a rather undercooked film. The ingredients are good but they haven’t gelled into a satisfying whole and despite its great potential it never convinces dramatically.... Monkey Puzzle is far from being a bad film, it just doesn’t ring true, at least on the big screen."

== Accolades ==
Year	Award	Category	Result	Ref.
2008	Shanghai International Film Festival	Best Environment Film	Won	
