= Robert Morgan (actor) =

Australian actor

- Other name: Robert G. Morgan
- Occupation: Actor
- Years active: 1980–present

Robert Morgan is an Australian actor. He was nominated for the 1996 AFI Award for Best Actor in a Supporting Role for his role as Snakey in Life.

Morgan's other film work includes Suburban Mayhem, The Craic and Hacksaw Ridge. He has also appeared on television, including the second series of Fire and the first series of Jack Irish.

Morgan has a long career on stage in plays such as Dealer's Choice and Shadow Boxing.

== Filmography ==
Year	Title	Role	Notes
1984	Waterfront	McRae	3 episodes
1984	Special Squad		Episode: "Counterfeit Lady"
1984	Carson's Law	Partridge	Episode: "One Step Ahead"
1984–1986	Prisoner	Norm Worthington/Dr. Kent/Ray Carter	3 episodes
1985–2005	Neighbours	various	8 episodes
1985	Anzacs	Train Conductor (uncredited)	Episode: "Now There Was a Day"
1986	The Flying Doctors	Steve Ryan	Episode: "The Show Goes On"
1986	What's the Difference		Television film
1987	The Far Country	Clerk of Courts	2 episodes
1989	Raw Silk	Kelly	
1990	Heaven Tonight	Carl Bracken	
1990	Father	Pub Brawler	
1990	The Big Steal	Stewart	
1991	Boys from the Bush	Pete	Episode: "The Stuffed Platypus"
1991	Ratbag Hero	McIntosh	Miniseries
1994–2003	Blue Heelers	Various	6 episodes
1994	A Country Practice	Brian Moffat	Episode: "Mother's Day"
1994	Everynight ... Everynight	Kert	
1994–1995	Janus	Bear/Jackson	2 episodes
1995	Correlli	Officer Ross Bannerman	3 episodes
1995	Blue Murder	Brian Hansen	1 episode
1995	Angel Baby	Paramedic	
1996	Fire	Peter 'TNT' Jackson	12 episodes
1996	Life	Snakey	
1997	Frontline	Gordon	Episode: "One Rule for One"
1999	The Craic	Colin	
1999	Redball	Sr. Det. Mike Brown	
1999	Wildside	Will Bolten	1 episode
1999-2003	Stingers	Various	3 episodes
2000	Muggers	Ted	
2000	Introducing Gary Petty	Ian Petty	Episode: "The Antique Dealer Who Did Me Wrong"
2000	SeaChange	Sgt. Odgers	Episode: "Half Life"
2001	The Micallef Program	Over-Explaining Burglar	1 episode
2001	Shock Jock	Det. Insp. Stone	Episode: "Cops and Dobbers"
2001	He Dies with a Felafel in His Hand	Melbourne Detective 2	
2002	The Secret Life of Us	Gordon Blake	Episode: "An Ill Wind"
2003	White Collar Blue	Bruno	1 episode
2005	The Proposition	Sergeant Lawrence	
2005	Stranded	Red	Short film
2006	Opal Dream	Sid	
2006	Suburban Mayhem	John Skinner	
2006	The Book of Revelation	Doctor	
2006	Court of Lonely Royals	Police Officer YYYY	
2008	Canal Road	Malcolm Reynolds	5 episodes
2008	The Hollowmen	Army Commander	Episode: "Military Matters"
2011	City Homicide	Bruce Dalton	3 episodes
2011	Killing Time	Chief Inspector Damien Spry	1 episode
2013	Miss Fisher's Murder Mysteries	Joe Mclean	Episode: "Marked for Murder"
2014	Cut Snake	Duck	
2015	Childhood's End	Morton	Episode: "The Deceivers"
2016	Jack Irish	Stedman	6 episodes
2016	Major Crimes	Hart Colson	Episode: "Dead Zone"
2016	Hacksaw Ridge	Colonel Sangston	
2016	The OA	Sheriff Stan Markham	3 episodes
2017	Pirates of the Caribbean: Dead Men Tell No Tales	Grimes	
2017	Sunset Park	Caelin Roche	
2018	The Dwarves of Demrel	Brenn	
2019	Lethal Weapon	Starks	Episode: "There Will Be Bud"
2019	To Hell and Gone	Eungard	
2019	Paradise City	Douglas Friedkin	
2020	Westworld	Buchan	Episode: "Parce Domine"
2020	The Secrets She Keeps	Detective Chief Inspector Macateer	3 episodes
2021	Streamline	Coach Clarke	
2021	Encounter	Dexter	
2021	Los Angeles	Agent D'Onofrio	
2022	The Debt Collector	Mr. W	
2022	George & Tammy	Pappy Daily	2 episodes
2022	Babylon	Director (Wallach's Party)	
2022	Before It Ends	Jeb	
2023	Star Trek: Picard	Fenris Ranger	Episode: "Disengage"
2023	The Boys in the Boat	Professor Stone	
2024	High Country	Dominic Schaeffer	2 episodes
2025	The Accountant 2	Burke	
2025	Landman	Nash	Episode: "Dark Night of the Soul"
2026	Criminal Minds	Frank Warner	Episode: "Now and Then"
2026	I Play Rocky	Burgess Meredith	
2026	East of Eden †	Horace Quinn	Upcoming
