= X: Night of Vengeance =

2011 film by Jon Hewitt

- Theatrical film poster
- Directed by: Jon Hewitt
- Written by: Jon Hewitt; Belinda McClory
- Produced by: Lizzette Atkins
- Starring: Viva Bianca; Hanna Mangan-Lawrence; Peter Docker
- Cinematography: Mark Pugh
- Edited by: Cindy Clarkson
- Music by: David Franzke; Byron Joel Scullin
- Production companies: Screen Australia; Film Victoria; Circe Films; Rough Beast; Celluloid Nightmares
- Distributed by: Potential Films
- Release dates: 4 August 2011 (MIFF); 21 November 2011 (Australia)
- Running time: 99 minutes
- Country: Australia
- Language: English

X: Night of Vengeance is a 2011 Australian thriller film directed by Jon Hewitt and starring Viva Bianca, Hanna Mangan-Lawrence, Peter Docker, Stephen Phillips, Eamon Farren, and Belinda McClory.

X: Night of Vengeance had its world premiere at the Melbourne International Film Festival on 4 August 2011 and was released in Australia on 21 November 2011.

== Plot ==
Shay, a runaway girl on her first night in Sydney, finds work as a prostitute. During one of her rounds, Shay is beaten up by couple of pimps because she took one of their customers. Meanwhile, Holly is on her last night working as a high-class call girl before departing with one of her clients to Paris. Needing a brunette girl for one of her customers, Holly discovers Shay and recruits her for a sexual encounter. In the client's hotel room, the two witness him being killed by Bennett, a corrupt police officer.

The girls flee the hotel, chased by Bennett through King's Cross, Sydney's red-light district. Desperate to throw him off their trail, Holly and Shay use a cab driven by Harry, and the pair manage to evade Bennett, only for him to track Holly using the murder victim's recent call list. Bennett intercepts Holly, murders the pimps surrounding her, and proceeds to assault and capture a defenseless Holly. They drive through the street looking for Shay. It is then revealed that Shay is seventeen years old and ran away from home after her mother died. After Shay briefly stays in a room, Bennett finds her walking through the streets, and chases her, leaving Holly trapped inside the car.

Holly takes Bennett's car and rescues Shay by running over Bennett. Holly decides to seek help from her boyfriend Ligurian, who happens to be another police officer. Holly and Shay visit Ligurian at a strip club in need of assistance in fleeing the city. However, Bennett arrives, brutally kills an employee of the club, and proceeds to shoot Holly only for Ligurian to gun him down, killing him.

Unfortunately, due to his relationship with Bennett, Ligurian turns on the women and forces Shay to drive him and Holly out of the building. In a split second, Shay drives the car into a wall, killing Ligurian. Holly and Shay then escape with a briefcase they found before Holly succumbs to grievous injuries from the crash. Heartbroken, Shay leaves in Harry's taxi. At sunrise at a beach shore, Harry gives Shay his pet rabbit to hold.

== Cast ==
- Viva Bianca as Holly
- Hanna Mangan-Lawrence as Shay
- Peter Docker as Ligurian
- Stephen Phillips as Bennett
- Eamon Farren as Harry
- Belinda McClory as Katherine / Marilyn
- Darren Moss as Giles
- Freya Tingley as Cindy
- Hazem Shammas as Willie
- Wayne Blair as Bob
- Billie Rose Prichard as Rose
- Rowan Witt as Luke

== Production ==
X was shot in and around Kings Cross, Sydney.

== Release ==
The film premiered at the 60th Melbourne International Film Festival in 2011. The film was sold overseas before it premiered in Australia, which director Hewitt attributed to the difficulty that Australian films have competing against American films domestically.

== Reception ==
Rotten Tomatoes, a review aggregator, reports a 69% approval rating based on 16 reviews and a rating average of 5.3 out of 10. Glenn Dunks on Oyna Magazine gave X: Night of Vengeance a B+, stating that the film "won't be for everyone, but I found myself enjoying every second of its slick, bordering on camp, nature. It's one of the most alive and confident genre titles to come out of this country in quite some time", while Xan Brooks of The Guardian gave it a 2/5 rating and said, "Hewitt's pungent early scenes of Oz's underbelly have a certain crystal-meth intensity, but the buzz can't last, and the film starts to wilt."

=== Accolades ===
Cindy Clarkson was nominated for Best Editing at the 2nd AACTA Awards.

== See also ==
- Cinema of Australia
