= Bloodlust (1992 film) =

- VHS cover
- Directed by: Jon Hewitt; Richard Wolstencroft
- Written by: Jon Hewitt; Richard Wolstencroft
- Produced by: Jon Hewitt
- Starring: Jane Stuart Wallace; Kelly Chapman; Robert James O'Neill
- Cinematography: Gary Ravenscroft
- Edited by: Jon Hewitt
- Music by: Ross Hazeldine
- Release date: 14 March 1992
- Country: Australia
- Language: English
- Budget: $70,000 - $75,000

Bloodlust is a 1992 Australian vampire film directed by Jon Hewitt and Richard Wolstencroft and starring Jane Stuart Wallace, Kelly Chapman and Robert James O'Neill. It debuted at the Fatal Visions Film Festival in Melbourne on 14 March 1992. The producer marketed is as being banned in Britain after their Customs and Excise classified it as obscene, preventing it's importation.

== Production ==
Co-director Jon Hewitt described it as:

A purpose-made, market-driven, crass, exploitation film. It isn't particularly good but, for me, it was really my film school. It's where I taught myself how to make a feature film and made a lot of mistakes on it - but I tried to learn from them. It was a film made in the context of not really being able to get any support for anything I was trying to do, then just going out and making something that I thought would have a back-end market, would be a safe bet, a sort of straight-to-video schlock film.

Filming took six weeks and was very difficult, with one member of the cast being arrested on drug charges. However Hewitt says it proved profitable. Frank Thring and Sheila Florance were signed to appear in the film but due to health issues had to be replaced.

== Cast ==
- Jane Stuart Wallace as Lear
- Kelly Chapman as Frank
- Robert James O'Neill as Tad
- Phil Motherwell as Brother Bem
- Paul Moder as Steig
- James Young as Zeke
- Max Crawdaddy as Deke
- Ian Rilen as Dee
- Colin Savage as Sonny
- Big Bad Ralph as Butch
- Lex Middleton as Brother Bob
- Michael Helms as Brother Thiatus
- Esme Melville as Basket Lady
- Michael Adams as Stoned Hippy
- John Flaus as Mr. Fetish

== Reception ==
David Stratton wrote in Variety "Striving for cult status, "Bloodlust" is a crudely made schlocker conceived along familiar lines. It contains enough sex, gore and drugs (as well as a punk rock score) to grab some of the video market internationally, but theatrical possibilities are limited to fringe venues." In Cinema Papers Karl Quinn writes "The vampires are Lear (Jane Stuart Wallace), Frank (Kelly Chapman) and Tad (Robert James O’Neill), three ostensibly funky, groovy, inner-city merchants of cool, who unfortunately come across as three of the most boring, vacuous characters imaginable. Sex, drugs and rock and roll have rarely seemed as unenticing a way of spending an evening as it does in the hands of this trio. A trip to hipsville courtesy of Melbourne’s The Lounge, ending in an orgy of sex and violence (doesn’t it always?) in a vacant warehouse, is realized with as much gusto as if the trio had been playing Monopoly and drinking raspberry cordial." Neil Jillet in the Age wrote "The film-makers get one thing right: 'Bloodlust' has consistently tacky ideas (including necrophilic sodomy) and production values. The intermittently coherent plot deals with the activities of vampires (not the kind who have to shut up shop during the day), fundamentalist Christians and thugs. The swings in style, from deadpan to contemporary Gothic, are more inept than funny." INPRESS's Jim Bob says "This low-budget blockbuster is bubbling with black humour, cheap sex, gratuitous violence and a perverted stylishness."
