= British Airways Flight 149 =

1990 aircraft occurrence in Kuwait

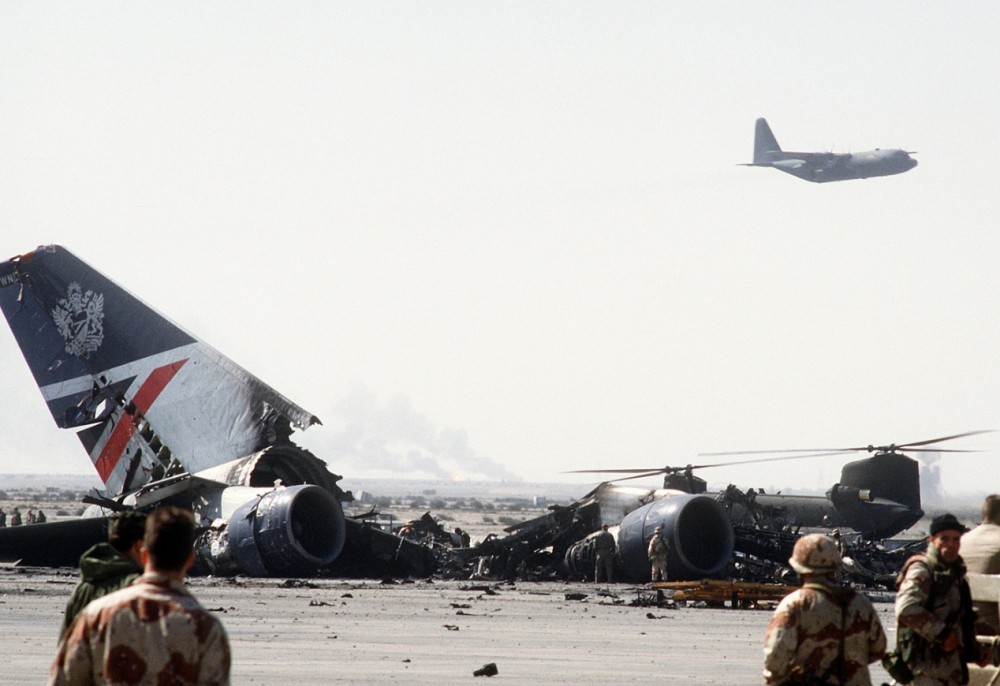
- Wreckage of the aircraft after being blown up

Occurrence
- Date: 2 August 1990
- Summary: Passengers and crew taken hostage, hours after the Invasion of Kuwait started
- Site: Kuwait International Airport, Kuwait City, Kuwait

Aircraft
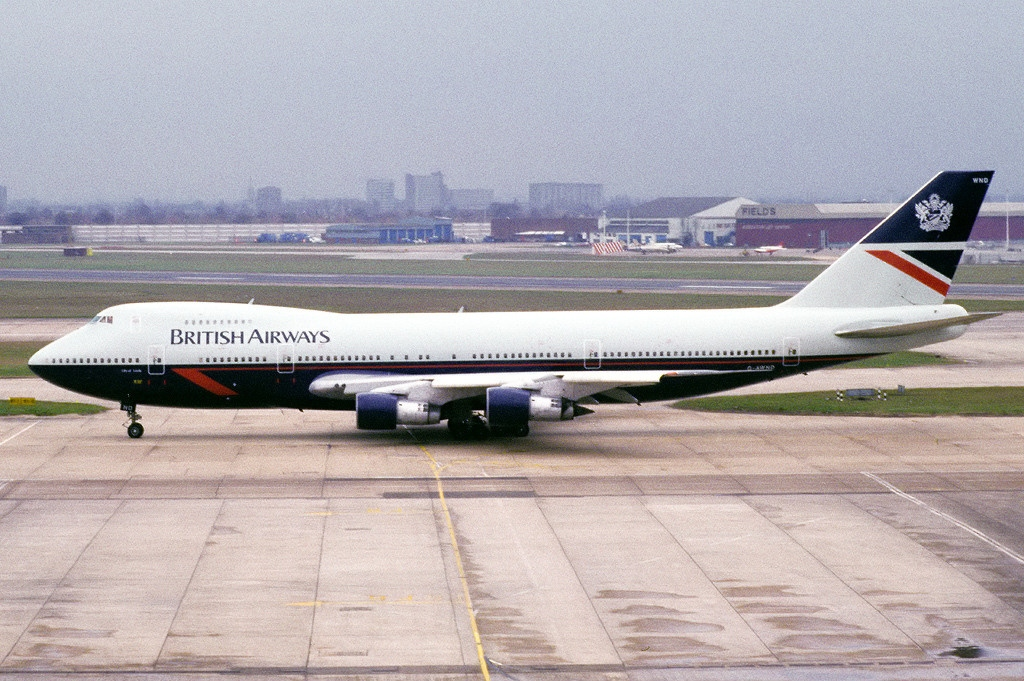
- G-AWND, the aircraft involved, seen in 1985 with a previous livery
- Aircraft type: Boeing 747-136 (Note: The aircraft was a Boeing 747-100 model; Boeing assigns a unique code for each company that buys one of its aircraft, which is applied as an infix to the model number at the time the aircraft is built, hence "747-136" designates a 747-100 built for British Airlines, which has 36 as its customer code.)
- Aircraft name: Coniston Water
- Operator: British Airways
- IATA flight No.: BA149
- ICAO flight No.: BAW149
- Call sign: SPEEDBIRD 149
- Registration: G-AWND
- Flight origin: Heathrow Airport, London, United Kingdom
- 1st stopover: Kuwait International Airport, Kuwait City, Kuwait
- Last stopover: Madras International Airport, Madras, India
- Destination: Subang International Airport, Kuala Lumpur, Malaysia
- Occupants: 385
- Passengers: 367
- Crew: 18
- Fatalities: 1
- Injuries: 1
- Survivors: 384

British Airways Flight 149 was a scheduled flight from Heathrow Airport to Subang International Airport via Kuwait International Airport and Madras International Airport, operated by British Airways using a Boeing 747-100.

Before the aircraft landed at Kuwait International Airport on 2 August 1990, Iraq launched a full-scale invasion of Kuwait during the early hours of that morning. Following the aircraft's arrival, the flight was never resumed due to the invasion. Within hours, the Iraqi Army advanced as far as Kuwait City and took control of the airport, where they captured the aircraft and its occupants. The majority of the passengers and crew were initially detained at several nearby hotels along with other foreigners under armed guard. The airliner was later destroyed on the ground; the identity of those responsible for its destruction remains unknown.

During their detention, passengers alleged that they were subjected to abuse and witnessed atrocities performed by Iraqi forces. To secure their release, former British Prime Minister Edward Heath travelled to Baghdad to lead negotiations, which included direct talks between Heath and Saddam Hussein. One passenger, a Kuwaiti citizen, was listed as having been killed by Iraqi troops while all remaining passengers were released from their captivity following the conclusion of the conflict. Many of the detainees developed post-traumatic stress disorder after being released.

== Aircraft and crew ==
Flight 149 was operated by a Boeing 747-136 with the manufacturer serial number 19764/107 and aircraft registration G-AWND. Its engine model was the Pratt & Whitney JT9D-7A and its aircraft name was Coniston Water.

The pilot-in-command of the Heathrow-Kuwait leg was Captain Richard Brunyate, supported by pilot Senior First Officer Richard Paul Stanley Houselander, while the cabin crew were overseen by Cabin Service Director Clive Earthy. Peter Clark had been due to take over as captain for the Kuwait-Madras leg.

== Background ==
At 19:05 BST (18:05 GMT) on 1 August 1990, British Airways Flight 149 (BA 149) departed from Heathrow Airport with 367 passengers on board, its final destination was Kuala Lumpur with scheduled layovers in Kuwait City and Madras. The flight had been delayed at Heathrow for several hours; according to the captain of the first leg of the flight, Richard Brunyate, the cause was a fault in the aircraft's auxiliary power unit; some passengers claim to have heard crewmembers arguing if they should proceed or not. The flight had a scheduled stopover at Kuwait City; however, this was not cancelled or changed despite media reports of the worsening political situation in the region. Kuwait's larger neighbor, Iraq, had issued demands for territory to be surrendered to its control and had been staging a military buildup on the border between the two nations for weeks. During the delay at Heathrow, the flight crew requested up-to-date reports on the situation in Kuwait and were told nothing untoward was happening despite news of growing tension.

Shortly after the flight departed, the crew radioed ahead for another report, speaking to both Kuwaiti air traffic control (ATC) and British Airways Flight 148, a Lockheed Tristar which had departed from Kuwait earlier. Both claimed that the situation at Kuwait International Airport appeared normal. Captain Brunyate later testified that he elected to resume the stopover in Kuwait after again talking to Kuwaiti ATC during the final approach and being told that it was fine to land at the airport. He also stated that he asked permission to perform an additional circuit pattern to observe the airport from above and did not notice anything suspicious. However, on 2 August 1990, the same day as BA 149's flight, Iraq launched a military invasion of Kuwait.

At 04:13 AST (01:13 GMT) on 2 August 1990, BA 149 landed at Kuwait International Airport and the passengers were disembarked for what should have been an hour wait. The airport was deserted and there was little-to-no staff on the ground; at the point of its landing, all other scheduled flights by other airlines had been cancelled or diverted for several hours already at this point. Thirty passengers were booked on the flight to finish their journey in Kuwait and disembarked the plane with the inbound crew who proceeded to set off for their hotel. According to some passenger accounts, those who were disembarking in Kuwait proceeded to immigration but found that their luggage was not being unloaded. There were reports that, prior to BA 149's landing, British military personnel had taken control of Kuwait Airport's control tower. Between 04:45 and 05:05 local time, the crew for the onward flight and remaining passengers boarded the Boeing 747 in anticipation of the next leg to Madras which was to be captained by Peter Clark. During the preparations to takeoff, the flight crew were informed that the airport would be closed for two hours. At 05:20, Iraqi fighter-bombers reportedly bombed the airport's runway, preventing its use, and knocked out the airport's control tower. The cabin crew ordered an evacuation of the aircraft and the passengers were initially moved into the terminal building. At 06:00 local time, Kuwaiti radio made a national announcement that Iraqi troops had crossed the border.

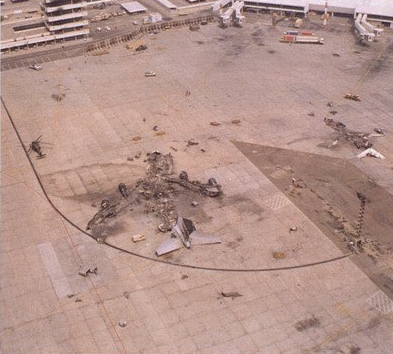
Overview of the wreckage

At 07:30 AST (04:30 GMT), both the crew and passengers who had been on board Flight 149 were escorted from the terminal by the Iraqi army and transported by bus to the airport's onsite hotel. On 3 August 1990, it was reported that all of the 367 passengers and 18 crewmembers from BA 149 were safe and well.

The empty 747, which had remained at Kuwait International Airport throughout the war, was destroyed on the ground by an aircraft attack during the latter stages of the conflict; the destruction may have been an intentional act of the US military to prevent its use by the Iraqi military. Alternatively, the aircraft may have been destroyed by Iraqi ground forces during their withdrawal from Kuwait. As a consequence of its destruction, British Airways was able to collect on the airliner's insurance. Two of the aircraft's landing gears were salvaged and are displayed at Waterside, British Airways' headquarters at London Heathrow.

== Immediate reaction ==
In the days that followed, British Airways expressed its outrage at Flight 149's situation. BA's chairman, Lord King, publicly blamed the Foreign Office and the British security services for their failure to promptly designate Kuwait as a war zone, which would have caused the flight to be diverted. BA's area manager for Kuwait and Iraq Lawrence O'Toole later said that he contacted the British Embassy in Kuwait prior to BA 149's departure to ask if it was safe to continue flights within the region and was told that a full-scale invasion of Kuwait was unlikely. Very quickly, there was considerable public controversy over whether the British government would have been able to intervene to avoid Flight 149's detention, as well as when had it become aware of the invasion of Kuwait.

In September 1990, Prime Minister Margaret Thatcher stated that Flight 149 had landed in Kuwait hours prior to the invasion. However, passengers on board BA 149 reportedly heard gunfire and tank activity during their layover in Kuwait City and a member of the inbound crew also claimed to have heard "loud bangs" whilst being ferried from the airport to their hotel; Thatcher also attributed the invasion to an earlier point in time in her memoirs. British Airways and the Foreign Office have both claimed that Flight 149 had landed in Kuwait two hours following the start of the invasion.

== Detention of passengers ==
After leaving the aircraft, all the passengers and crew were captured on the ground by Iraqi forces who had overrun Kuwait City. The majority of the detained passengers were initially transferred to the airport hotel within the boundaries of the airport until the crew of BA 149 negotiated for everyone to be moved to the Regency Hotel where British Airways crew and staff flying into Kuwait were routinely based. The crew of BA 149 and some of the passengers unsuccessfully tried asking the British Embassy to be evacuated from the country. Later on as international opposition to the Iraqi occupation grew, the passengers were ordered from the Regency Hotel, separated into groups and confined to various hotels in Kuwait, also designated by the Iraqis for other foreigners to report to.

The Iraqis claimed the passengers to be "honoured guests", and in the following week moved them under armed escort from a mix of policemen and soldiers from Iraq, to locations in Kuwait and Iraq. The British transferees were accommodated primarily on the upper floors of the Al-Mansour Melia Hotel in Baghdad; hostages from other nationalities were housed in different hotels. During the early stages of the crisis, Brunyate stayed with the passengers and crew to reassure them but later escaped with help from members of the Kuwaiti resistance. Brunyate later explained that his father, who had worked in Iraq, had personally run afoul of Saddam Hussein and he feared reprisals if his surname was recognised by the Iraqi authorities.

External videos
- ABC News - "Hostages Released in Iraq"
- BBC News - "Outrage at Iraqi TV Hostage Show"

Hostages later said they had witnessed various atrocities during their detention, such as attacks made upon Kuwaiti citizens by Iraqi forces; some of the hostages themselves were subjected to forms of mental and physical abuse, which included instances of mock executions or rape, and were kept in unsanitary conditions with little food. During a location transfer of the hostages by bus, a British Airways flight attendant was raped by an Iraqi soldier. The soldier was reportedly executed near the hostages after cabin services director Clive Earthy complained about the incident to the lead officer of the Iraqi troops detaining them. One passenger Jennifer Chappell stated that she witnessed Iraqi tanks driving over cars with Kuwaiti civilians trapped inside while her brother John saw the execution of a Kuwaiti soldier at the hands of Iraqi troops. Another hostage, David Fort was injured after an Iraqi guard pushed him down a flight of stairs. A small number of passengers and crew managed to escape and were sheltered with help from Kuwaiti resistance fighters.

After ten days, the detainees were dispersed to various military-industrial sites. Women and children were given the opportunity to return home in late August, whereas those who remained were used as human shields, and transferred between sites. Sites would contain between eight and 20 detainees of mixed nationalities, typically British and American citizens, as well as French, German, Japanese and others.

Different groups of detainees were released at various stages, often dependent upon their nationality, but also including criteria such as ill health and the body of one individual who had died during captivity. While some passengers were detained only for a few weeks, others were detained for months, often in poor conditions. Former British prime minister Edward Heath travelled in person to Baghdad for direct talks with Iraq's President Saddam Hussein, and is credited with leading negotiations to successfully release the hostages taken. During mid-December 1990, the last of the remaining American and British hostages were released by Iraq.

One passenger from BA 149, a Kuwaiti national (later described in various reports as a member of the Kuwaiti Royal Family or a security director) was listed as being murdered by Iraqi soldiers. None of the other hostages were intentionally killed by Iraqi troops.

== Investigation ==
Several court actions were raised by passengers against British Airways in respect of Flight 149, often accusing the airline of negligence by continuing to land in Kuwait hours after the invasion, as well as for loss of property. On 15 July 1999, a group of French passengers were awarded damages from British Airways valued at £2.5 million; separately, the airline also chose to settle compensation claims filed on behalf of US passengers. During October 2006, several of the former hostages called for an independent public inquiry into allegations that Flight 149 had not been diverted by the British government due to the flight playing a role in a state intelligence operation.

Some passengers accused British Airways of using Flight 149 as an attempt to evacuate their staff from Kuwait. However, BA personnel in Kuwait were not instructed to board Flight 149 and the inbound crew left for their hotel once the flight had landed. The crew of BA 149 later criticised the British Embassy in Kuwait for what they saw as inaction in helping them to evade capture or to leave Kuwait while there was still a window of opportunity.

A 2007 documentary, commissioned and shown by the BBC and shown elsewhere by Discovery Channel, claimed that the US and UK governments were aware almost as soon as Iraqi Armed Forces crossed the border and by 03:00 Kuwaiti time were fully informed that an invasion had taken place and fighting had ensued. This awareness would have been at least an hour before BA149 touched down, during which several other flights had diverted to Bahrain or other alternative destinations to avoid a potential situation. In October 1992, Prime Minister John Major, who had taken over from predecessor Margaret Thatcher, denied any attempt to influence British Airways in regard to the decision to operate BA 149; however, this has been contradicted by sworn statements that British Airways had in fact been briefed by the British government and informed by them that it had been 'safe to fly'.

It has been alleged that the British government had allowed Flight 149 to proceed for intelligence-gathering purposes by transporting British operatives to Kuwait. On 2 October 1992, in response to a question on the issue, Major said "I can confirm, however, that there were no British military personnel on board the flight". However, the 2007 documentary included an interview with an anonymous former SAS soldier, who claimed that he and his team had been on Flight 149 for the purposes of intelligence gathering in Kuwait. In 2007, British Member of Parliament Norman Baker claimed to be in possession of affidavits signed by "members of special forces," which, according to Baker, said "that they were on that plane and were put there to carry out a mission at the request of the British Government". Baker claimed that external accounts had given corroboration to such statements, including from the then-United States Ambassador to Kuwait W. Nathaniel Howell, former member of MI6 Richard Tomlinson, and individuals claiming to be Central Intelligence Agency operatives at the time.

Some media sources commented on the fact that British Airways allegedly withdrew the computer database list containing the passenger manifest for Flight 149 the day after the aircraft was captured; however, British Airways have maintained that this is a standard procedure in the event of an emergency in order to protect the identities of people on board and so that next of kin can be notified.

On 23 November 2021, Foreign Secretary Liz Truss confirmed that the government of that time had misled British Airways and the public about a prior warning that was not passed on to the airline.

== In popular culture ==
Black Box 149 is a play which tells a story about the grounding of this flight with the main character being the pilot.

The hostage crisis is the focus of the 2025 Sky television documentary Flight 149: Hostage of War.

== See also ==
- Aviation accidents and incidents
