= Belinda McClory =

Australian actress

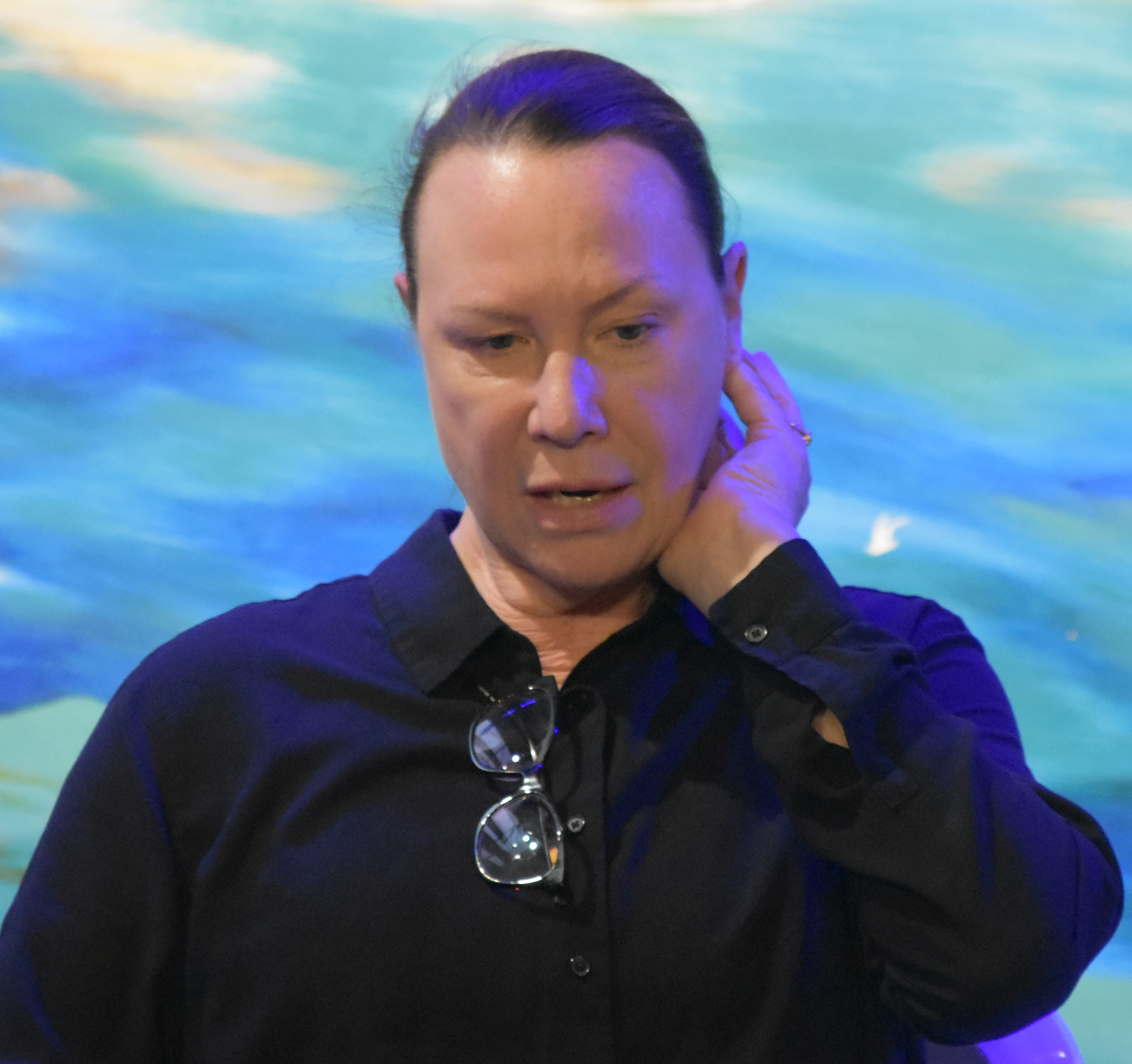
McClory in 2025 at the Queenscliffe Literary Festival

Belinda McClory is an Australian film, television, and stage actress, mainly known for her role as Switch in The Matrix.

== Early life and education ==
Belinda McClory was born in Adelaide, South Australia. Her father was a police officer, giving her insight to the life of a police officer and their family.

== Career ==
McClory has acted on stage as well as performing in a wide variety of roles in films and on television.

=== Stage ===
On stage, among other roles, she played a supporting role of the 2004 Australian production of Frozen. She also performed in the 2009 Griffin Theatre Company production The Modern International Dead in Sydney, and in Edward II at the Malthouse Theatre in Melbourne in 2016.

=== Film ===
In 1999 McClory became known for her role as Switch in The Matrix. Other film roles include Mullet (2001); Cubbyhouse (2002); The Book of Revelation (2006) with Tom Long; and Dominic Purcell action film "Turkey Shoot" (2014), which she co-wrote.

In 2011 she played two characters in X: Night of Vengeance, which she co-wrote.

In 2026 she plays Olivia, the mother of the main character, played by Harvey Zielinski, in his directorial debut feature Sweet Milk Lake.

=== TV ===
She appeared in the NBC TV series Camp from 2012 to 2013, and has had roles in many Australian television series, including playing a main role as Alice Harvey in seasons 2 to 5 of The Doctor Blake Mysteries.

== Recognition and awards ==
McClory received a Helpmann Award for Best Female Actor in a Supporting Role in a Play for her role in the 2004 Australian production of Frozen.

== Personal life ==
On 30 January 1999 she married director Jon Hewitt.

== Filmography ==
=== Film ===
Year	Title	Role	Notes
1996	Life	Sharon	
1996	Hotel de Love	Janet Campbell	
1996	The Big Maybe	Death	Short
1999	The Matrix	Switch	
1999	Redball	Det. JJ Wilson	
2001	Mullet	Kay	
2001	Cubbyhouse	Lynn Graham	
2006	Darklovestory	Gretchen	Also writer
2006	The Book of Revelation	Jeanette	
2008	Acolytes	Kay Wright	
2011	X: Night of Vengeance	Katherine / Marilyn	Also writer
2014	Turkey Shoot	Meredith Baxter	Also writer
2017	The Wheel	Chairperson	Post-production
2026	Sweet Milk Lake	Olivia	

=== Television ===
Year	Title	Role	Notes
1990	A Country Practice	Tess	"Kiss Me Kate: Part 1"
1991	The Flying Doctors	Tina	"Swinging on the Rope"
1993	Seven Deadly Sins		"Envy"
1993	Phoenix	Cilla	"Snow Job"
1993	The Feds: Deadfall	Pauline	TV film
1994–95	Janus	Kirsty Nichols	Main role
1994	Blue Heelers	Jennifer Willis	"Payback"
1995	Halifax f.p.	Paula Kingsley	"Hard Corps"
1997	Simone de Beauvoir's Babies	Wendy	TV miniseries
1997	The Adventures of Lano and Woodley	Girl Across the Road	"Star Quest"
1998	Good Guys, Bad Guys	Carmen Francis	"Car Wars"
1998	SeaChange	Dorothy Della Bosca	"Stormy Weather"
1998	Murder Call	Carol Magnus	"Skin Deep"
1999	Blue Heelers	Sr. Const. Robyn Taylor	Recurring role
2001	BackBerner	Susan Lamb	"1.129"
2001	Corridors of Power	Tanya Dunne	Main role
2002	All Saints	Nicola Lewis	"Opening Night", "The Show Must Go On"
2003	Kath & Kim	Mona	"The Shower"
2013	Miss Fisher's Murder Mysteries	Madam Lyon	"Murder Most Scandalous"
2013	Camp	Aunt Jeanette	"Last Days of Summer"
2014–2017	The Doctor Blake Mysteries	Alice Harvey	Main role (season 2–5)
2016	Little Acorns	Belinda	"United Nations of Toddlers", "She's a Man", "Eat Cake"
2017	Glitch	Vicky Carmichael	"A Duty of Care"
2017	Oddlands	Civix (voice)	TV film, completed

== Theatre ==
- Frozen (2004)
- The Modern International Dead (2009)
- Edward II (2016)
- My Sister Feather (2018)
