= Meat shoot =

Shooting sport

A meat shoot is a type of target shooting event and fundraiser similar to block shoots, ham shoots, and turkey shoots. Participants aim at paper targets using shotguns to win cuts of meat as prizes.

Meat shoots are run as fundraising events by groups such as civic organizations or conservation groups. Other groups which hold meat shoots include rod and gun clubs, churches, American Legions, and VFW chapters.

Meat shoots are most popular in the rural United States, particularly the South, Midwest, and East Coast.

Trap shooting is the competition in some meat shoots.

== Rules of Play ==
To enter a meat shoot, participants purchase tickets for a small fee, giving them the chance to shoot. A single individual may buy multiple tickets to give themselves a greater chance of winning a prize.

Most meat shoots are competitions of target shooting using shotguns. The object is to try and hit as close to the center of the target as possible. A judge determines which person was closest to the center and awards the prize accordingly.

Since these games are normally played with shotguns or pellet guns, there is an element of randomness in the way the shot hits the target. This randomness increases excitement and levels the playing field, making meat shoots more fun for families and unskilled marksmen.
