= Black Box 149 =

Play by Rosemary Johns

- Author: Rosemary Johns
- Cover artist: Peter Mumford
- Language: English
- Genre: Play
- Publisher: Currency Press
- Publication date: 2012
- Publication place: Australia
- Media type: Print (Paperback)
- ISBN: 978-0-86819-943-6

Black Box 149 is a play by Australian playwright Rosemary Johns.

== Plot ==
An account of the grounding of British Airways Flight 149 at Kuwait International Airport during the Iraqi invasion of Kuwait in 1990.

== First production ==
Black Box 149 was first produced at La Mama Theatre, Melbourne, on 15 September 2011, as part of the 2011 Melbourne Fringe Festival, with the following cast and crew:

- Pilot – Dennis Coard
- Man – Majid Shokor
- Director – Matt Scholten
- Dramaturgical Advisor – Julian Meyrick
- Set Design and Graphics – Peter Mumford
- Stage Manager/Operator – Benjamin Morris
- Audiovisuals – Brett Ludeman

== Reception ==
Black Box 149 was included on the 2012 Victorian Certificate of Education drama syllabus, and was presented at the 2012 9th Women Playwrights International Conference. It was also selected and performed at Nuremberg as part of the Australia now Germany program 2017.
