= Caldron Pool =

Australian Christian conservative news website

- Website type: Conservative news website
- Available in: English
- Headquarters: {{{location_country}}}
- Founder: Ben Davis
- Website: caldronpool.com
- Launched: October 2017; 8 years ago
- Content licence: All rights reserved

Caldron Pool is an Australian Christian conservative news website, launched in October 2017 by Ben Davis. Caldron Pool is named after a lake in the fictional land of Narnia.

According to Media Matters for America, Caldron Pool is one of a number of news sites who have "obsessively reported on trans athletes", and has labelled it as an anti-LGBT right-wing media.
