= Darlinghurst Nights =

Musical based on collection of poems

Darlinghurst Nights is a musical. The text was written by Katherine Thomson and music by Max Lambert, based on the verse of Kenneth Slessor. The plot takes place in Sydney, Australia.

It was premiered by Sydney Theatre Company at the Wharf Theatre on 7 January 1988, as part of the Festival of Sydney, playing a six-week season. The production also toured to Canberra.

Darlinghurst Nights was revived by the Hayes Theatre in Sydney in 2018.
