= Gorman House, Canberra =

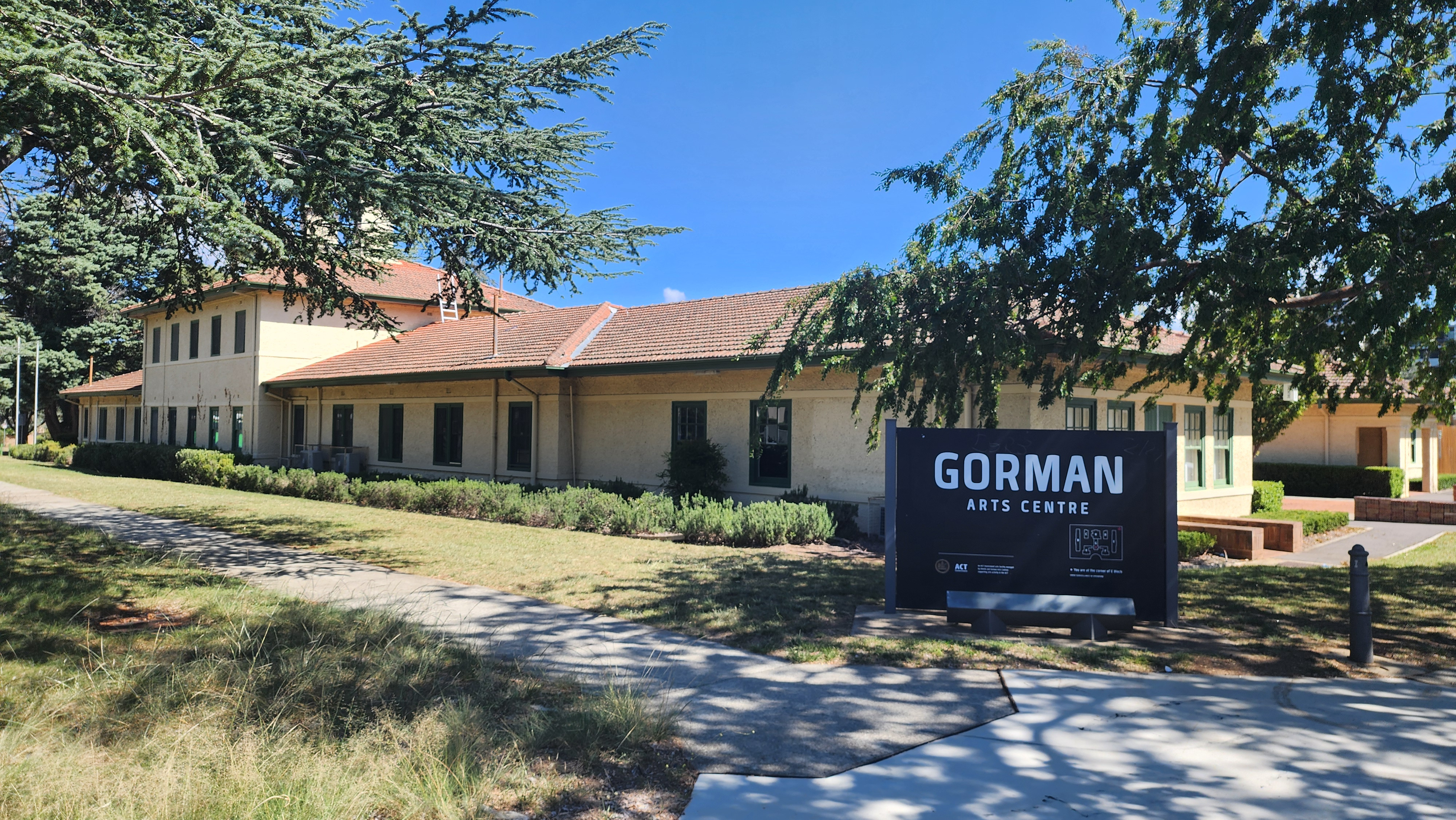
Gorman House, Braddon

Gorman House in Braddon, Australian Capital Territory is an Art Deco landmark house located in inner Canberra. It operated as a hostel from 1924 until 1972 and has subsequently become a popular centre for theatre and the creative arts in fields such as photography, dance, acting and music. It is listed on the National Heritage Register which describes it as "a fine and externally intact example of John Smith Murdoch's garden pavilion style, which makes a creditable contribution to the townscape." The garden pavilion style is characterized by low buildings, covered paths and open courtyards.

When it was constructed in 1924 the hostel was known as “Hostel No. 3” and in early 1925 was renamed the “Hotel Ainslie” and then in 1927 Gorman House. It was to provide accommodation for public servants and initially accepted both men and women. The first residents had moved in by 1925. The original structure consisted of single story pavilions with the dining room as the central focus but this accommodation was found to be insufficient so in 1928 two double story buildings were added at the western and eastern ends which enclosed the inner courtyards. It was mainly used to provide accommodation for young women but if demand fell men were also allowed to become guests. However if there was an increase in female clients the men were asked to leave.

== Early history ==
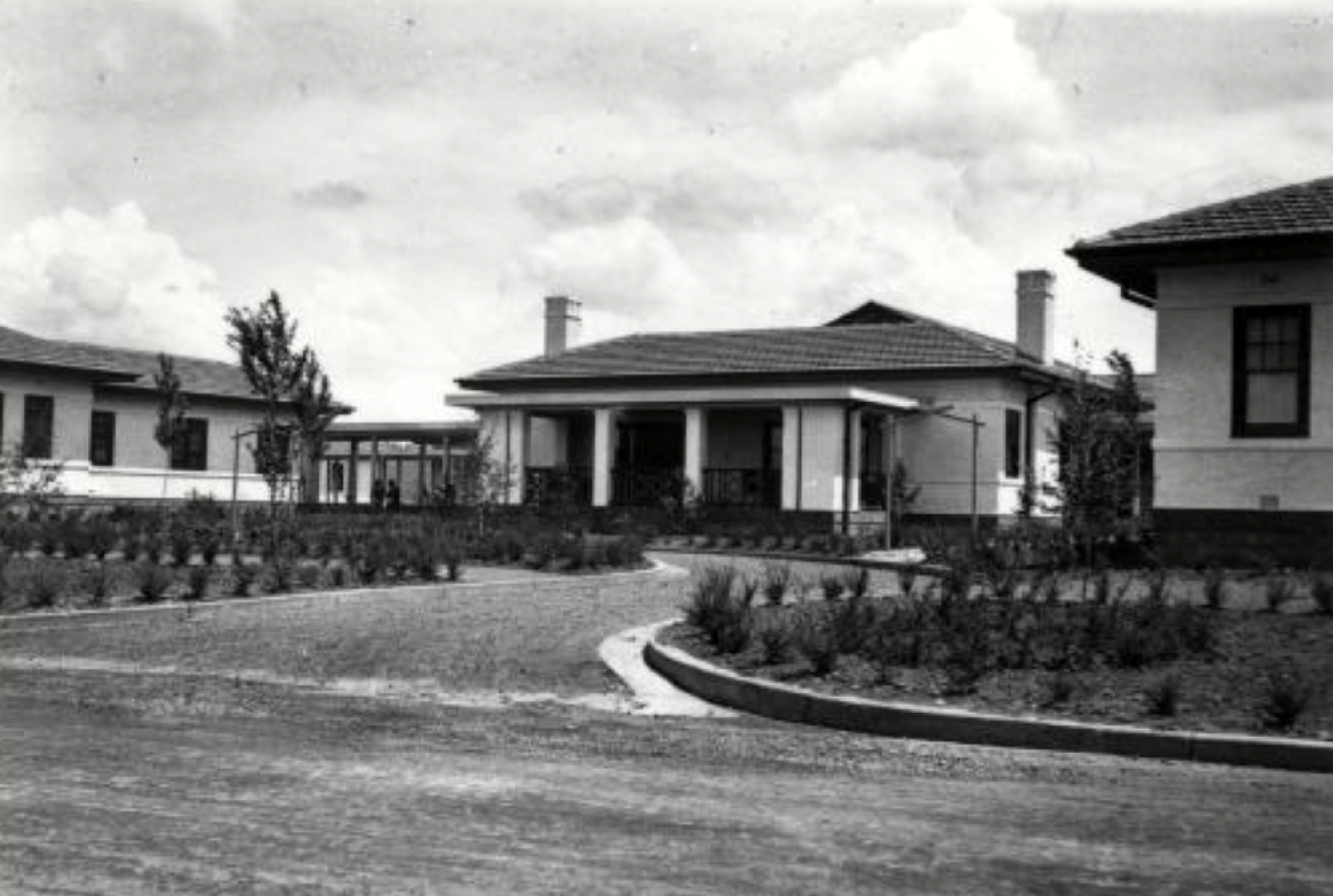
Photo of Gorman House taken by Astley Pulver shortly after he became a resident in 1925

The building was named after Clarence Hardie Gorman (1873-1927) (see photo below) who was a Commissioner of the Federal Capital Commission (now the National Capital Authority whose role was to plan and develop Canberra. Gorman’s particular focus was on land policy both within and outside the city. He was also responsible for the administration of the hostels. He died suddenly of appendicitis on 24 January 1927 which shocked many in Canberra. Three months later in April 1927 it was announced that the Hotel Ainslie would be called Gorman House in his honour.

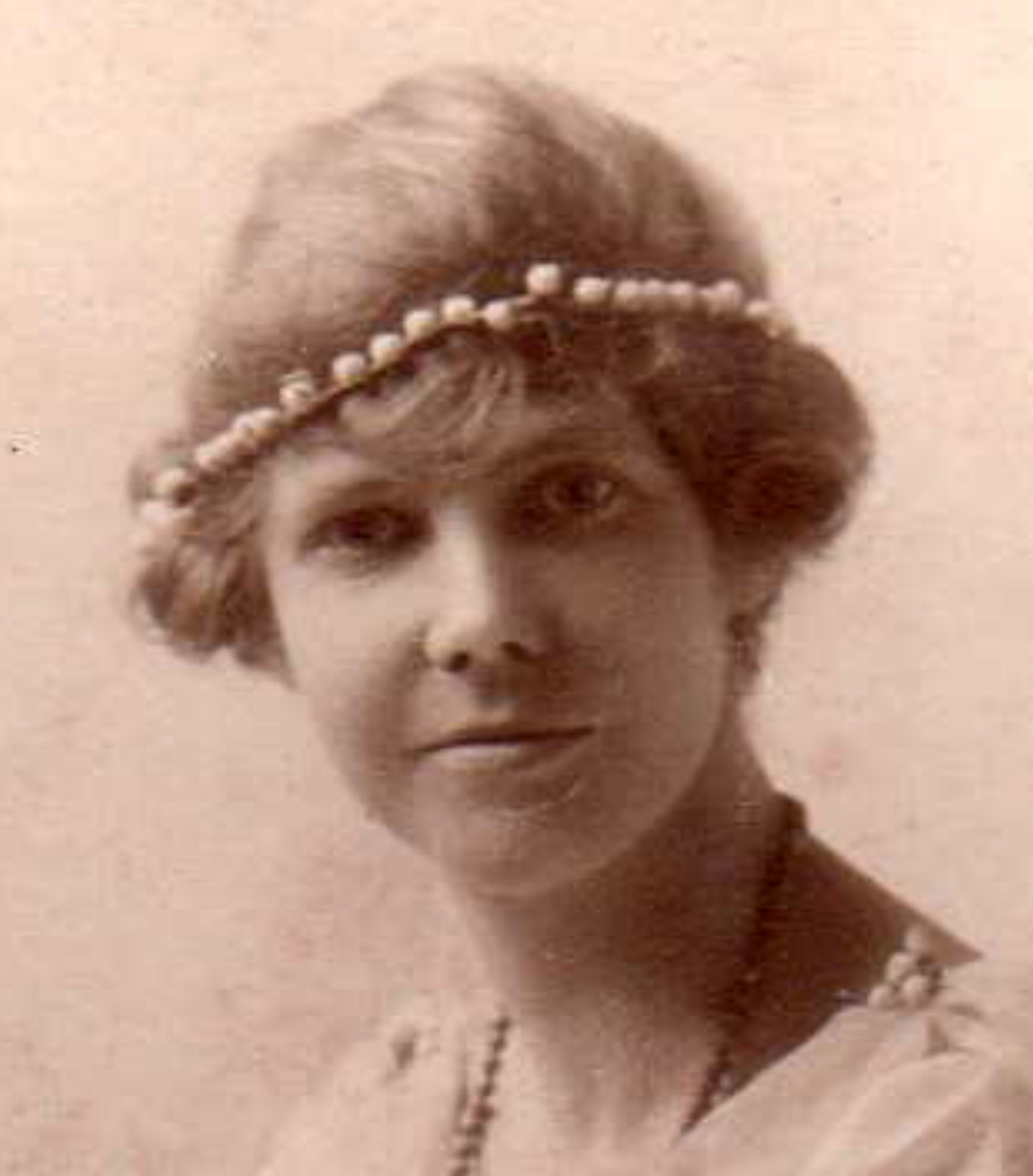
Vivian Thwaite, one of the first residents of Gorman House

One of the early residents was Astley Pulver, a young surveyor employed by.the Survey Office in the Engineering Branch. He arrived in April 1925 and was met by one of his fellow employees at Queanbeyan Station. He says that after crossing the newly completed Commonwealth Avenue Bridge his driver pointed out Parliament House which at this time had only ground level foundations. A little way further was the Hotel Canberra with only the centre block and the two front wings completed. They then went to his new home Gorman House. He took several photos of the hostel while he was a resident one of which is shown.

He mentions that two women who were at Gorman House when he arrived were the first residents of the hostel. These were Miss Lida Sutor who was a typist at the Survey Office and Vivian Thwaite. Vivian was a stenographer and was involved in many of the social activities. She was a member of the House and Recreation Committee whose role was to care for the wellbeing of residents and organize events such as the monthly dances at the hostel. She is mentioned on numerous occasions in the Canberra Times as being present at these events. For example at one of the monthly dances it is mentioned that she was wearing a dress of "blue fringed georgette over silver tissue".

Astley lived at Gorman House until 1927 when because of the influx of female public servants there was a shortage of accommodation and the men were asked to leave. He mentions that he moved to a cottage nearby with some of his workmates but continued to have his meals at Gorman House.

A magazine called the Australian Woman's Mirror published two articles about Gorman House in 1927 and 1929.The 1927 article which was written before the two double story buildings were added reads as follows.

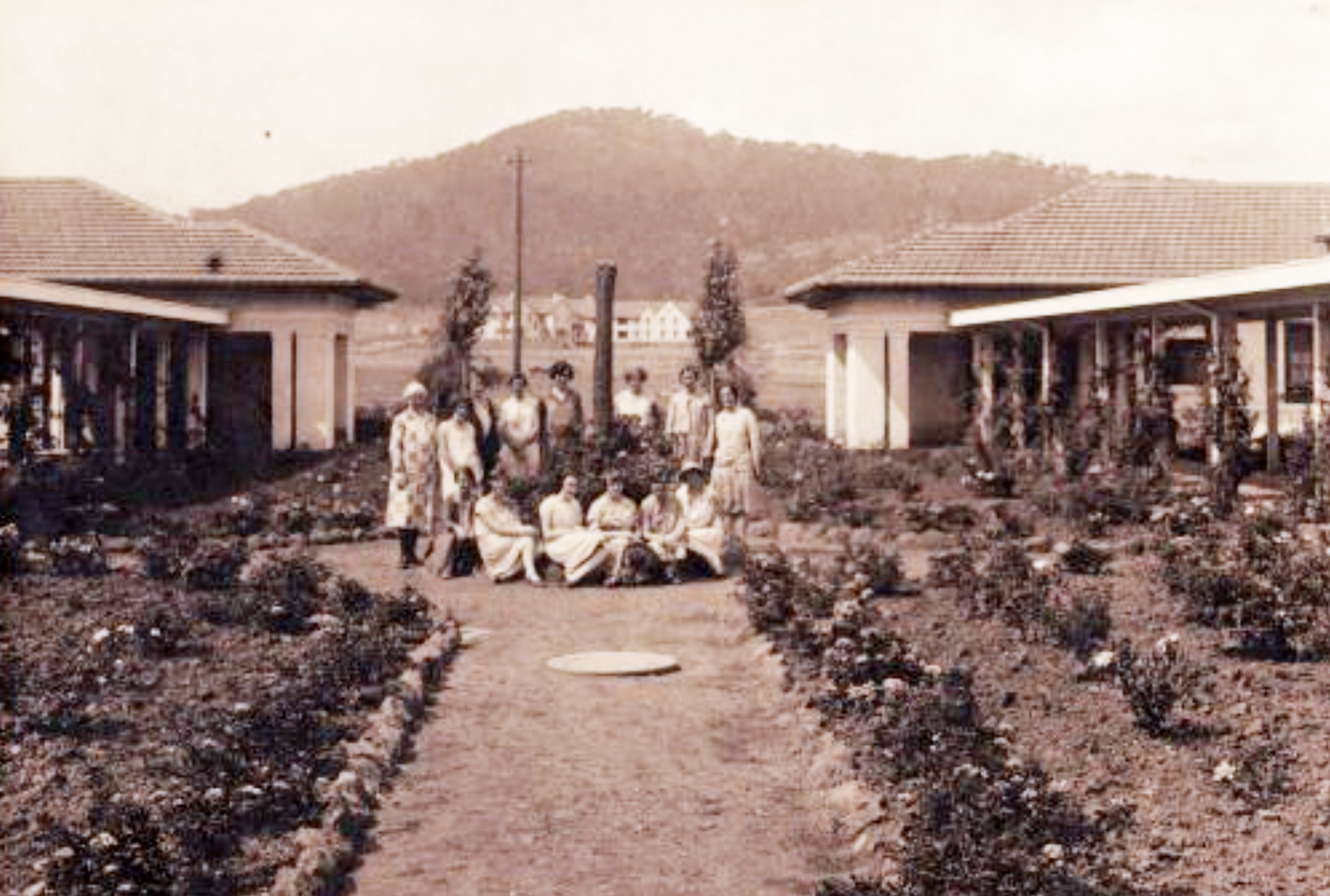
Courtyard in Gorman House in 1928 before the two story buildings were added at each end. The Hotel Ainslie can be seen in the background.

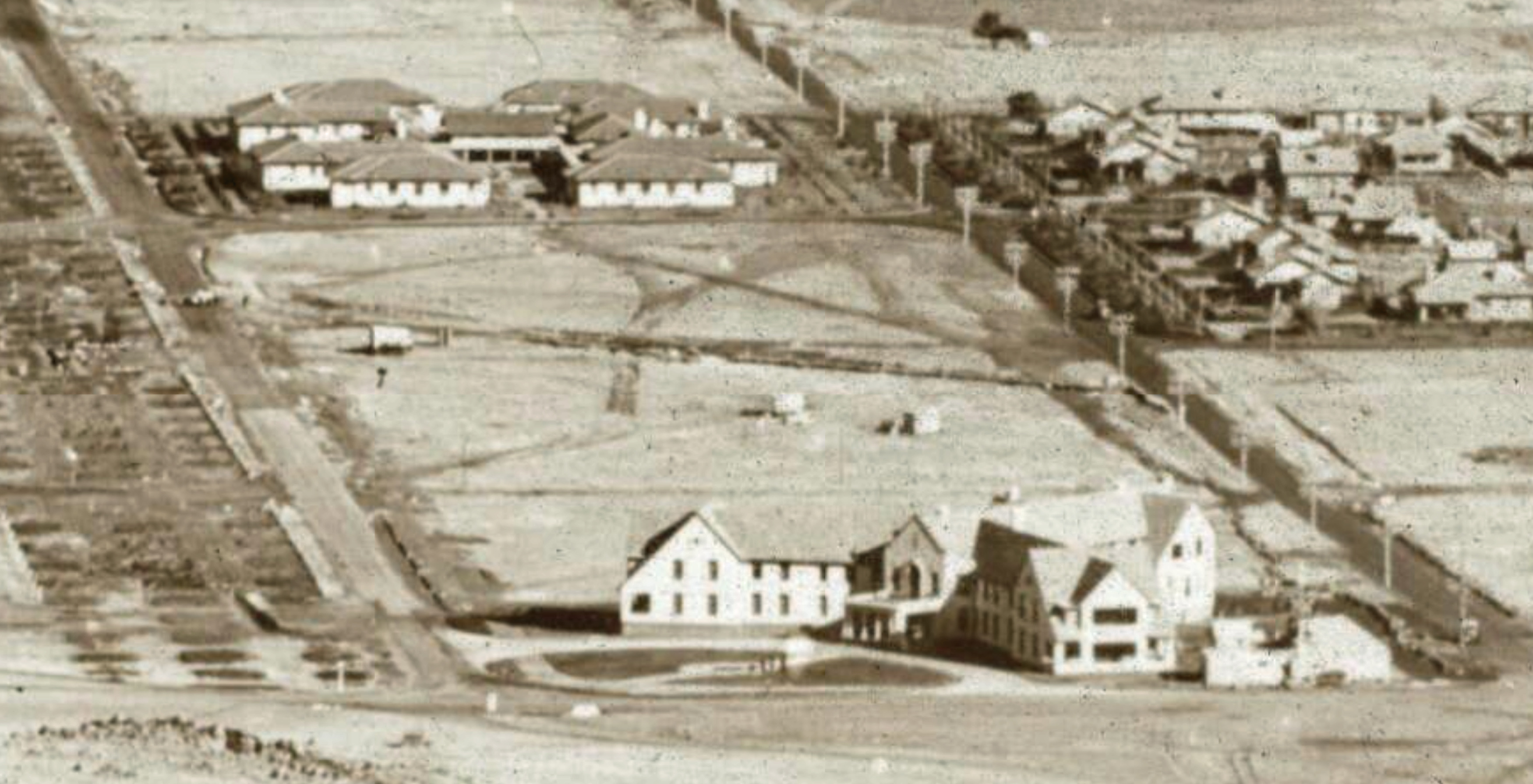
Gorman House (top left) in 1928 before the two story buildings were added. The Hotel Ainslie is at the bottom right.

"There are chiefly single rooms each containing a wardrobe, dressing table, comfortable chair and a bed finished with a pretty eiderdown. There is a laundry (in which the copper fires are set up and cleared up by men) and electric irons. Beautiful verandahs surround a spacious sunny courtyard abloom with lovely flowers and front verandahs look over rolling green hills. The five sitting rooms are furnished with Chesterfields and easy chairs and many light chairs are available for the verandahs. There are no restrictions on the boarders whose only duties are to keep their rooms clean and tidy. They have all meals at the hostel."

The 1929 article which describes Gorman House after the two end buildings were added is as follows.

"Gorman House, is an unusual and attractive building on the pavilion plan, surrounded by delightful gardens. In design it resembles in miniature the Canberra Hotel. When it became a girls’ hostel it was enlarged to its present considerable dimensions.

The house consists now of eight pavilions or separate cottages, one of which is reserved for the staff. Each contains ten rooms. In this total of eighty there are twenty double-rooms— that is, they contain two beds and are shared by two girls. There are also two two-storey buildings of seventeen rooms each, one at each end of the grounds. The pavilions are built between these blocks, four facing the frontage and four facing a road at the back. The buildings are surrounded and divided by well-tended gardens that ensure plenty of sunlight and fresh air in each room—a necessary provision, for cold weather is experienced in Canberra in Winter. All rooms are further provided with outside shutters on the windows for use in the extreme heat of Summer.

Gorman House buildings cover about three acres of ground. Two long sheltered walks with open verandahs, connect the several pavilions. They pass through delightful lawns and flower-beds, and the supporting posts are covered with creepers that give a most picturesque effect by day. At night multifold electric lights along the verandahs convey an illusion of fairyland. There are about a hundred girls from several States now in residence at Gorman House, but before long the full capacity of one hundred and twenty-four will be reached.

Eight comfortable sitting-rooms are provided for the girls’ use, in six of which are large open fireplaces, with huge log fires, laid ready tor lighting the moment the girls return home in the evening. The other two sitting-rooms are heated by radiators, so that there need never be complaint of cold. The bedrooms are all of good size, airy and bright, and well furnished with good suites that include wardrobes. All have modern basins with water laid on. Floors are well covered and carpeted, and an eiderdown is provided for very bed.

A large laundry is set apart for the girls own use, with numerous troughs and coppers. Huge boxes of split wood are filled ready for use, and there is electric light and power for ironing. A man’s services are available to light fires and clean up generally—all this without extra charge to hostel guests.

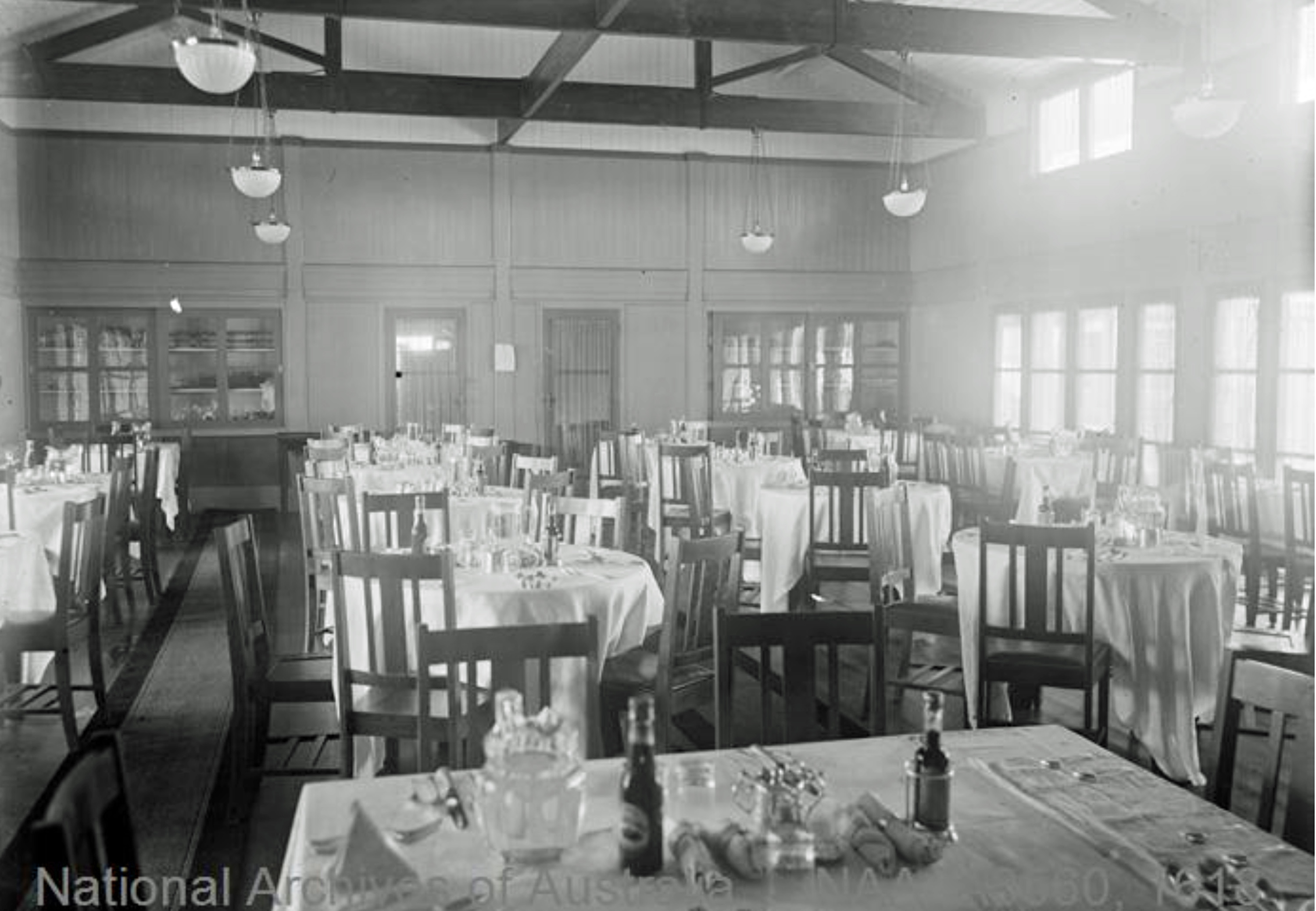
Dining room in Gorman House 1926. It is, as the magazine article describes, furnished with small tables, restaurant style, to seat four or eight persons.

The dining-room is large and roomy, with windows along two sides. These lookout on the gardens. On another side large, modern glass doors, screened with the latest craze in ecru-colored curtains, open on to the passage-way. The dining-room is furnished with small tables, restaurant style, to seat four or eight persons. The tables are very attractively set out with good napery, cutlery and silver, and dining-room chairs are of leather-seated oak very comfortably upholstered. Waitresses attend to guests’ wants; none need ever rise to serve herself.

The girls are required to attend to their own bedrooms, but a staff of women and a couple of men are kept to do all work outside the girls’ own rooms. The girls are encouraged to invite and entertain their friends, both male and female, and no serious restrictions are placed in the way of having dances or card parties, many of which are organised for charitable and other social objects in the Capital."

At about this time one of the residents of the hostel wrote to The Sydney Mail briefly describing her experience living at Gorman House. She said.

"The post-office, where our office is, is two miles away from Gorman House, the Government, hostel for typists, where we stay. The hostel consists of a number of pavilions all linked together with latticed walks, and there are rose trees all around and creeping roses up the pillars. We walk to and from work, but get a bus at dinner (lunch) time.'. The, air is so fresh and bracing, and the walks are beautiful."

Courtyard at Gorman House in 1927	Gorman House courtyard, 1927	Clarence Hardie Gorman

== Later history ==
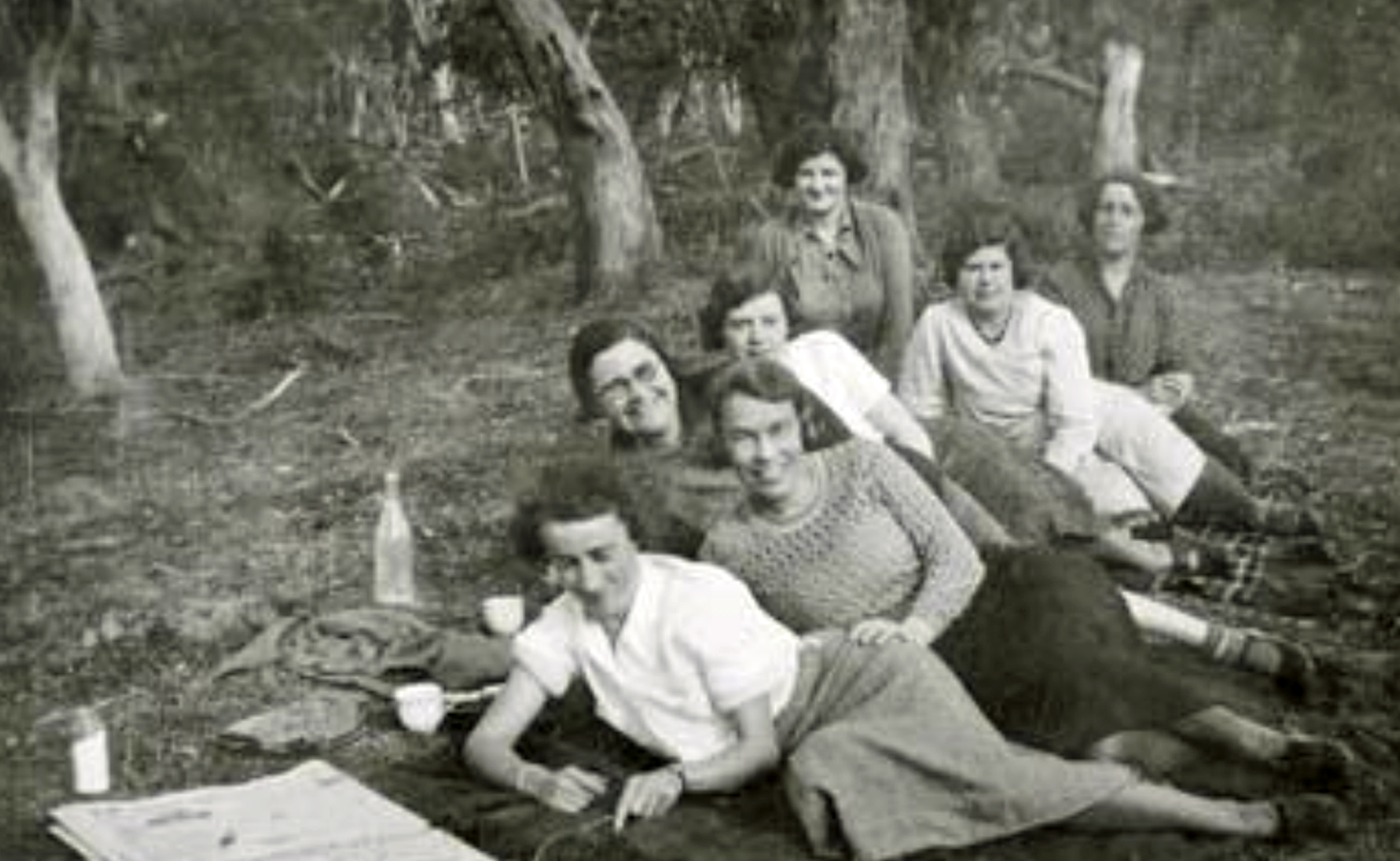
Eileen Lenihan (third from front) and friends at the Cotter River 1934.

One of the most notable residents during the 1930s was Eileen Lenihan who was Private Secretary to Sir Robert Menzies, She was a resident for almost ten years. Another was Edwin Charles who wrote many letters to his mother describing his experience. Some of these were published in The Canberra Times fifty years later. They were also included in a book called “Capital Correspondent”. In one of the letters he describes the food in the following terms.

"The meals here have been getting better. Brekker yesterday, chops, lambs fry and bacon and then later steak and sausages. Lovely cream puffs, for sweets, rainbow and ribbon sponge puddings."

In 1937 Edwin and the other men over 21 were asked to leave when more young women came to Canberra. Gorman House then became a hostel for women only.

In the 1940s during the war years one of the residents was Nancy Ward (later Metcalfe} who came from Adelaide as a young woman and lived in Gorman House. She said that there were about one hundred girls there at the time and she walked to her job in the Department of the Prime Minister in West Block until she managed to get a bike. Her work was coding and ciphering messages. She was one of a group of young women known as the “cable girls” who worked in a bunker behind West Block and sent highly confidential messages from the Prime Minister to other leaders of the allied countries including Winston Churchill. The full story can be read at this reference.

After 1949 Gorman House readmitted male residents and it remained as a mixed hostel until its closure in 1972. After this it served as offices for various Commonwealth Departments including the Australian Federal Police who used it as a training academy. In 1981 it was opened as the Gorman House Community Arts Centre.
