= Redball =

- Directed by: Jon Hewitt
- Written by: Jon Hewitt
- Produced by: Phillip Parslow
- Starring: Belinda McClory; John Brumpton; Dan Wyllie; Asher Keddie
- Cinematography: Mark Pugh
- Music by: Neil McGrath
- Production companies: Rough Beast; Paper Bark Films
- Distributed by: Palace Films; Scanbox International
- Release dates: 29 April 1999 (Australia); 19 August 1999 (U.S.)
- Running time: 91 minutes
- Country: Australia
- Language: English
- Budget: under A$300,000
- Box office: A$30,276 (Australia)

Redball is a 1999 Australian film.

Jon Hewitt wrote the script after seeing Belinda McClory in Janus, which was produced and aired on ABC TV between 1994 and 1995.

Most of the budget came from private sources with $100,000 from Film Victoria. The movie was shot on Mini-DV.

== Synopsis ==
Against a background of ongoing and systemic corruption, Victoria Police detectives Wilson and Walsh are tasked with solving a series of child murders committed in Melbourne by a serial killer dubbed "Mr. Creep". The film is also dispersed with scenes about a dead body found floating in the Yarra River, where more and more senior police officials instruct it to be ignored and send further downstream, reflecting the corruption, and apathy shown by police throughout the film.

== Cast ==
- Belinda McClory as Det. JJ Wilson
- John Brumpton as Det. Robbie Walsh
- Frank Magree as Det. Chris Hill
- Robert Morgan as Senior Det. Mike Brown
- Dan Wyllie as Ronny Sprinks
- Asher Keddie as Girl #2
- Neil Pigot as Bingo Wright
