= Turkey Shoot (2014 film) =

- Australian film poster
- Directed by: Jon Hewitt
- Written by: Belinda McClory; Jon Hewitt
- Based on: Turkey Shoot by Antony I. Ginnane; Brian Trenchard-Smith
- Produced by: Antony I. Ginnane
- Starring: Dominic Purcell; Viva Bianca; Belinda McClory; Nicholas Hammond; Juan Jackson; Suzannah McDonald; Roger Ward; Carmen Duncan; Robert Taylor
- Cinematography: Warwick Field
- Edited by: Jes Simpson
- Music by: Cezary Skubiszewski
- Production companies: Guardian Entertainment International; F.G. Film Productions; The Post Lounge; Screen Queensland; Thatcher Productions; Beeps; Cherryhill Holdings; PDER
- Distributed by: Potential Films
- Release date: December 4, 2014
- Running time: 90 minutes
- Country: Australia
- Language: English

Turkey Shoot (released internationally as Elimination Game) is a 2014 Australian dystopian science fiction action film directed by Jon Hewitt and co-written by Hewitt and Belinda McClory. Shot in Australia, the film stars Dominic Purcell, Viva Bianca, Robert Taylor and McClory. Inspired by the 1982 film of the same name directed by Brian Trenchard-Smith (who served as an executive producer on this film), it features appearances by two cast members from the earlier film, Carmen Duncan and Roger Ward, as well as the voice of producer Antony I. Ginnane as television network head Charley Varrick.

== Synopsis ==
In the near future, SEAL Commander Rick Tyler is sent to Libya to assassinate its leader. After apparently completing the mission he finds himself in a prison charged with war crimes for murdering the population of a village during the currently ongoing "World War Africa" and his mission apparently failed as the Libyan leader is still alive. Sentenced to life imprisonment, he is given a temporary reprieve to appear on a popular reality television show called Turkey Shoot where he is pitted against a series of professional killers voted for by the audience. If Tyler, who has no weapons, survives three levels of hunting he will receive a pardon.

== Cast ==
- Dominic Purcell as Commander Rick Tyler
- Viva Bianca as Lieutenant Commander Jill Wilson
- Robert Taylor as Sergeant "Ramrod" Llewyn
- Belinda McClory as Meredith Baxter
- Nicholas Hammond as General Charles Thatcher II
- Carmen Duncan as President Sheila Farr
- Roger Ward as Colonel Saif al-Muammar, the Libyan Dictator
- Juan Jackson as Tom Faye
- Suzannah McDonald as Teena Fine
- Ra Chapman as Kintay

== Production ==
Jon Hewitt co wrote and directed the film. He said "I loved Turkey Shoot but I did not want to remake it. This is a complete reinvention." "[The original] was a bit cheesy and camp," he added. "We're playing it for real. There's no camp irony."

Hewitt admitted that he was also influenced by The Running Man (1987). He said the film:

Tries to deliver what its target demographic would want. I’ve still got my moments of heady violence and exploding heads. We just wanted to make a serpentine thriller that delivered the goods to a pretty undemanding audience, but had some meat on its bones... We speculated sooner or later people are going to be putting their lives on the line for entertainment on screen.

He later elaborated:

We wanted to make an Australian action-adventure film for a relatively undemanding international audience, speaking the universal language of genre, but Belinda and I wanted to put a bit of meat on its bones and give it a satirical edge and comment on the state of the world at the moment. You know, to ask ‘Why are we actually at war?’ is one theme. Nobody seems to be actually talking about it. Are all these wars going on for the benefits of the countries or are they going on for the benefit of Google through YouTube and CNN and stations like that? Those are making a gazillion dollars. They're the worst offender. We wanted to speculate on that but put it in the subtext that people also want some sort of stalk and chase thriller could get into it as well.

Investment came from a number of sources including Screen Queensland and the Post Lounge, who did visual effects.

Liam McIntyre was originally announced for the role of Rick Tyler. However he had to drop out due to a scheduling conflict and was replaced by Dominic Purcell.

Shooting began in Melbourne on 5 February 2014.

== Release ==
The film was given a limited theatrical release in Australia. Hewitt:

Theatrical [release] is over for about 90 per cent of any film made anywhere in the world. You just have to look at what's released in cinemas now to understand that, but we are still compelled and forced to release every Australian film that gets made to give it a theatrical release, because of the way things are financed. So that's led to a lot of negativity because there's a lot of movies that just won't work theatrically. Theatrical is whole different thing now, it's about tent-pole movies and blockbusters and tent-pole art-house films – there's no theatrical play for movies like Turkey Shoot or The Mule or most Australian films.... The reason we haven't gone for the whole shebang – the simultaneous everything – is that I don't want the film available digitally until it's exploited in the US. Otherwise we are going to screw ourselves on an international sales front. That's the reason we haven't done it.

== Reception ==
The remake of Turkey Shoot received negative reviews from critics and audiences, earning a 20% approval rating on Rotten Tomatoes.

- "What should be a rollicking bullet train of big screen excess is instead an amateurish, borderline incoherent actioner starring Dominic Purcell, whose dead eyes and stiff physicality is perhaps the most telling aspect of this bumbling reheat." — Brian Orndorf, BluRay.com
- "There's also a lack of suspense, with events following the predictable pattern of a much-played video game." — Stephen Romei, The Australian
- "Most of the film consists of padding: lengthy introductory spiels from the TV studio, repetitive computer graphics, flat expository dialogue scenes." — Jake Wilson, Sydney Morning Herald
- "The action sequences are poorly rendered and its satirical edge is blunted by its borrowings from sharper films such as Rollerball and Starship Troopers." — Russell Edwards, SBS.com.au
