= Jon Hewitt =

Australian film director (born 1959)

Jon Hewitt (born 1959) is an Australian film director. He is married to actress Belinda McClory.

== Select credits ==
- Bloodlust (1992)
- Redball (1999)
- Darklovestory (2007)
- Acolytes (2008)
- X: Night of Vengeance (2011)
- Turkey Shoot (2014)
