= Don Hany =

Australian actor

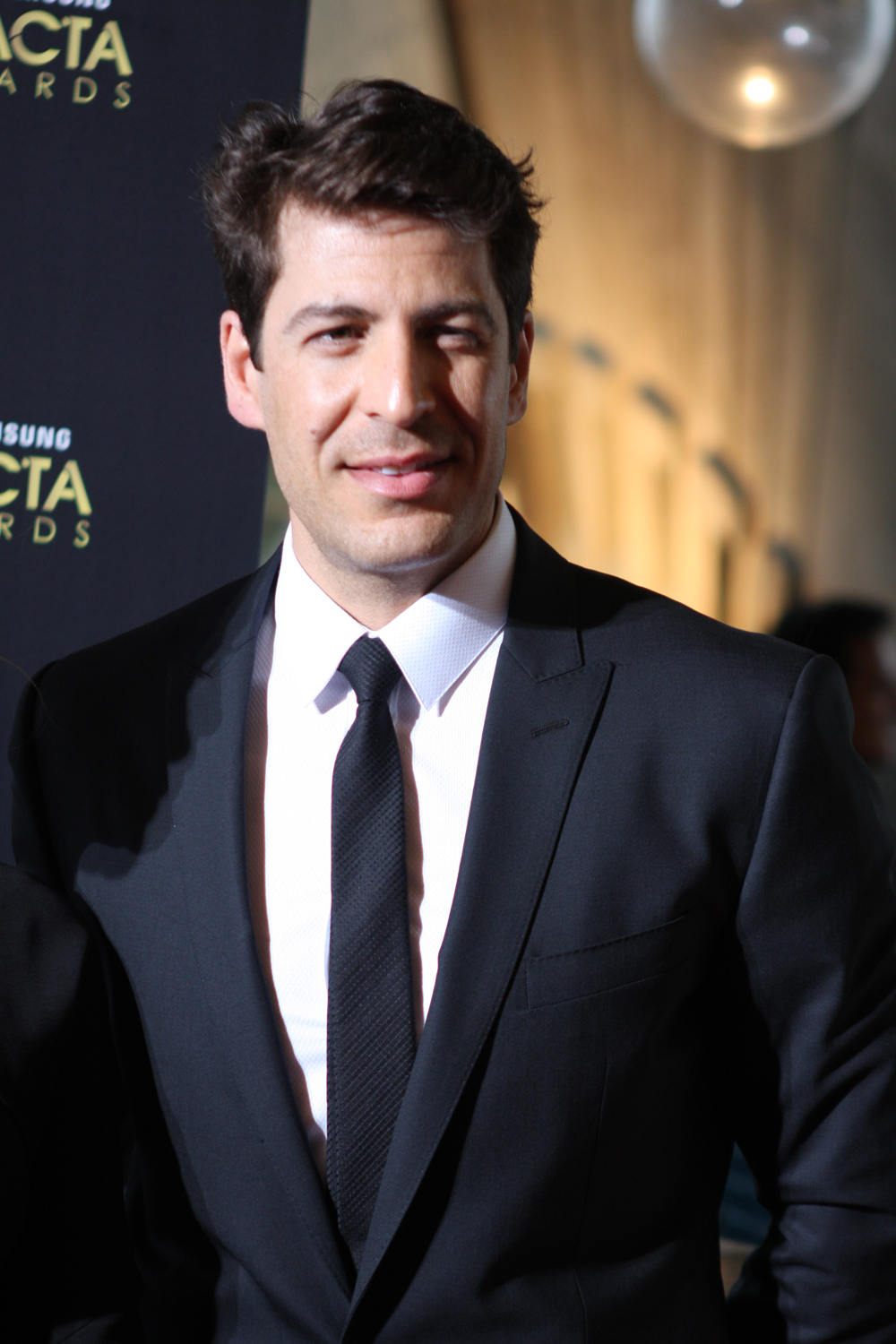
- Hany in 2012
- Born: Sydney, New South Wales, Australia
- Occupation: Actor
- Years active: 1998–present
- Known for: Zane Malik in East West 101; Chris Havel in Offspring; Spiros Georgiades in Tangle
- Spouse: Alin Sumarwata (m. 2011)
- Children: 2
- Awards: AFI (2008, 2009); Logie (2008, 2010)

Don Hany is an Australian film, television, and stage actor. He is best known in Australia for his role as Zane Malik in East West 101 and in the US for starring in the NBC medical comedy-drama series Heartbeat (2016).

He has received a number of accolades and nominations. He won a Logie Award for Most Outstanding Actor, playing the protagonist, Zane Malik, in the SBS series East West 101 (2007–2011). He also received three AACTA Awards nominations for the role.

He had an early role playing Senior Constable Theo Rahme in the Network 10 police drama series White Collar Blue (2002–2003) for two seasons. He also played Dr. Chris Havel in the Network 10 comedy-drama series Offspring (2010–2011). In 2014, he starred in the prison drama film Healing, for which he received a Best Actor award nomination from the Film Critics Circle of Australia. In 2017, he starred in the romantic comedy film Ali's Wedding, for which he received a nomination for AACTA Award for Best Actor in a Supporting Role. He played Dr. Mackenzie in the Showcase mystery romantic drama series Picnic at Hanging Rock (2018). He also played the Australian prime minister in the second season of Showcase political thriller television series Secret City (2019).

== Early life and education ==
Don Hany was born in Australia to an Iraqi father, Tewfiq, and a Hungarian mother, Csilla; his father is a classically-trained pianist and restaurateur, and his mother is a doctor of economics. Hany's maternal great-grandfather was shot dead outside his home in Miskolc by the Red Army, who mistook him for a German soldier. In 1946, Hany's maternal grandfather joined the Hungarian Communist Party. His parents met in Budapest in the 1960s and they emigrated to Australia in 1970. Csilla rejected the communist doctrine of her native country and Tewfiq spurned the Islamic beliefs of his upbringing. His parents divorced during his adolescence, and he and his twin brother were raised by their mother.

Hany grew up on the Central Coast of New South Wales. He attended high school in the Netherlands for one year as an exchange student, and later completed a degree in dramatic arts at the University of Western Sydney, Nepean.

== Career ==
In 1998, Hany began his television career, starring in the soapie Breakers. In 2000, he had a small role in Water Rats. In 2002, he had a role in the telemovie Heroes' Mountain and in the police drama White Collar Blue. He later moved to Los Angeles to complete shooting for the short film Winning the Peace. Hany plays an Iraqi-American Marine deployed to Baghdad, and he went on to win the Best Actor award at Method Fest in 2005.

In 2006, he returned to Australia to work on the film Lucky Miles, which went on to win the audience award for Best Film at the Sydney Film Festival. Beginning in 2007, Hany starred in the Australian mini-drama series East West 101 for SBS television, in which he played the lead role of Zane Malik. The show was later expanded, running for two more seasons, concluding in 2011. In 2010, Hany won the Logie Award for Most Outstanding Actor, having been previously nominated for the same role in 2008. In 2012, Hany and the cast won the Equity Award for Most Outstanding Performance by an Ensemble in a Drama Series for their work in the third season of the show.

In 2008, he had a recurring role in the first season of Underbelly, an acclaimed Australian television true crime-drama series on the Nine Network. The series depicts the 1995–2004 gangland war in Melbourne, with Hany playing Nik Radev. In 2009, Hany also starred in the two-part Australian television mini-series False Witness for BBC UKTV. Hany played the role of Sergei Krousov, a Russian mafia figure. In the same year, he starred alongside Joel Edgerton in ABC1's drama series Dirt Game.

In 2010, he joined the main cast of the Foxtel drama Tangle, playing politician Spiros Georgiades. He also joined Channel Ten's comedy-drama series Offspring, in the role of paediatrician Chris Havel. He played the love interest and colleague of the series' protagonist, Dr Nina Proudman, played by Asher Keddie. In 2011, he was nominated for the Logie Award for Most Popular Actor for his roles in Tangle and Offspring.

In 2011, Hany starred in the Nine Network movie premiere of Underbelly Files: Tell Them Lucifer was Here, reprising his role from Underbelly, Nik Radev. In 2012, he was cast in two telemovies, Jack Irish: Bad Debts and Jack Irish: Black Tide, which are based on the books Bad Debts and Black Tide by Peter Temple, and which aired on the Australian Broadcasting Corporation.

In 2013, Hany took the lead role of Sam Callaghan in the HBO Asia production Serangoon Road. The following year, Hany appeared in The Broken Shore, a telemovie that aired on the ABC. He also starred in the mini-series Devil's Playground. In the same year, he appeared in the fifth season of Who Do You Think You Are?. In 2014, he played the lead role in the Australian drama film Healing, alongside Hugo Weaving. Hany plays Viktor, an Iranian prisoner in a low-security correctional centre, close to the end of his 18-year prison sentence. The film garnered acclaim, including a four-star review from Margaret Pomeranz on At the Movies for ABC. Megan Lehmann of The Hollywood Reporter was also enthusiastic Hany's performance: "Weaving is terrific as Matt Perry...But the film belongs to Don Hany, a veteran of Australian television starring in his first major film." Hany was nominated for the Best Actor award at the 2014 Film Critics Circle of Australia, losing out to Russell Crowe for The Water Diviner.

In 2014, he was cast as the male lead in Warriors, a pilot for the American Broadcasting Company. The medical drama series, with Hany playing a military doctor, was not picked up for a series order. However, he was later cast as Dr. Jesse Shane, chief of surgery at St. Matthew's Hospital in the NBC medical comedy-drama series Heartbeat (2016). In 2017, he starred in the critically acclaimed Australian romantic comedy Ali's Wedding. He received a nomination for AACTA Award for Best Actor in a Supporting Role for his role, losing out to Dev Patel in Lion.

In 2018, Hany starred in Foxtel's Showcase mystery romantic drama television series Picnic at Hanging Rock, a television adaptation of the 1967 novel of the same name by Joan Lindsay. In 2019, Hany played Australian prime minister Ewan Garrety in the second season of the political thriller Secret City, alongside Anna Torv.

The following year, Hany took over the role of Pierce Greyson in Neighbours from Tim Robards for a guest stint. In 2022, Hany was cast alongside Claudia Karvan in the Sydney Theatre Company and State Theatre Company of South Australia co-production The Goat, or Who Is Sylvia? by Edward Albee, set for the 2023 season. Hany subsequently withdrew from the production for personal reasons and the role was recast with Nathan Page.

In 2025, he stars in The Survivors, a Netflix crime-mystery series set in Tasmania. The series is based on Jane Harper's novel of the same name. In August 2025, Hany would join the filming of UK/Australia Co-commissioned series The Imposter.

In the same year, he was also cast in Jaume Collet-Serra's upcoming survival-thriller, Play Dead.

== Personal life ==
Hany married actress Alin Sumarwata in 2011. The couple have two daughters.

He is an agnostic atheist.

== Filmography ==
=== Film ===
Year	Title	Role	Type
2026	Play Dead		Feature film
2016	Ali's Wedding	Sheik Mahdi	Feature film
2014	Healing	Viktor Khadem	Feature film
2014	Warriors	George	TV movie
2013	The Broken Shore	Detective Joe Cashin	TV movie
2012	Jack Irish: Bad Debts		TV movie
2012	Jack Irish: Black Tide	Dave	TV movie
2011	Tell Them Lucifer Was Here	Nik "The Russian" Radev	TV movie
2010	The Road to Success	Simon Diceman	Short film
2010	Suburbia	Joel	Short film
2009	False Witness	Sergei Krousov	TV movie
2008	The Last Confession of Alexander Pearce	John Mather	Feature film
2008	Plastic	Henry	Short film
2008	Four	Dr Brown / Real Estate Agent / Geoff	Short film
2006	Lucky Miles	Private Greg Plank	Feature film
2007	Sleep in Heavenly Peace	Trent Partiridge	Short film
2006	The TV Set	Guy in mall	Feature film
2006	California King	Eric	Short film
2006	Big Top	Bobby	
2004	Winning the Peace	Sergeant Charlie Latif	Short film
2000	Life in a Volkswagen		Short film
1999	The Monster	The Cowboy	Short film

=== Television ===
Year	Title	Role	Type
2025	The Imposter	Simon O'Riley	TV series
2025	The Survivors	George Barlin	TV series
2020–21	Neighbours	Pierce Greyson	TV series, 34 episodes
2019	My Life is Murder	Roger Simms	TV series. 1 episode
2019	Bad Mothers	Kyle	TV series, 8 episodes
2019	Secret City	Ewan Garritty, Australian Prime Minister	TV series, 6 episodes
2018	Doctor Doctor	Raph	TV series, 3 episodes
2018	Picnic at Hanging Rock	Dr Mackenzie	Miniseries, 6 episodes
2017–18	Strike Back	Omair Idrisi	TV series, 6 episodes
2017	Janet King	Clay Nelson	TV series, 2 episodes
2016	Heartbeat	Dr Jesse Shane	TV series, 10 episodes
2014	Childhood’s End	Paul Danlow	TV series, 1 episode
2014	Devil’s Playground	Bishop Vincent Quaid	TV series, 6 episodes
2013	Serangoon Road	Sam Callaghan	TV series, 10 episodes
2013	Who Do You Think You Are?	Self	TV series
2012	Devil's Dust	Adam Bourke	Miniseries, 2 episodes
2012	Rake	Damien Tengrove	TV series, 1 episode
2012	Futurestates	EMT 1	TV series, 1 episode
2010–12	Tangle	Spiros Georgiades	TV series, 6 episodes
2010–11	Offspring	Dr Chris Havel	TV series, 18 episodes
2010	Miracles	Robert Boguki	TV series, 1 episode
2009	Legend of the Seeker	Captain Ensor	TV series, 1 episode
2009	Chandon Pictures	Boysis	TV series, 2 episodes
2009	Dirt Game	Dion Pesci	TV series, 5 episodes
2008	Rush	Bobby Lavilla	TV series, 1 episode
2008	Underbelly	Nik "The Russian" Radev	TV series, 4 episodes
2007	All Saints	Carlo	TV series, 1 episode
2007–11	East West 101	Detective Zane Malik	TV series, 2 episodes
2003	White Collar Blue	Senior Constable Theo Rahme	TV series, 44 episodes
2002	Crash Palace	Gary	TV series, 11 episodes
2002	Heroes' Mountain	David Kuhn	Miniseries
2001	Life Support		TV series, 1 episode
2001	Flat Chat		TV series
2000	Water Rats	Rob Schreiber	TV series, 1 episode
1999	The Monster		TV series
1998	Breakers	Alex Markham	TV series

== Awards and nominations ==
Year	Group	Award	Film/Show	Result
2005	Method Fest Independent Film Festival	Best Actor	Winning the Peace	Won
2008	Logie Award	Most Outstanding Actor	East West 101	Nominated
2008	AFI award	Best Lead Actor in a Television Drama	East West 101	Nominated
2009	AFI award	Best Lead Actor in a Television Drama	East West 101	Nominated
2010	Logie Award	Most Outstanding Actor	East West 101	Won
2011	Logie Award	Most Popular Actor	Tangle and Offspring	Nominated
2011	Astra Award	Most Outstanding Performance by an Actor: Male	Tangle	Nominated
2012	AACTA Award	Best Lead Actor in a Television Drama	East West 101	Nominated
2012	Logie Award	Most Outstanding Actor	East West 101	Nominated
2012	Equity Award	Most Outstanding Performance by an Ensemble in a Drama Series	East West 101	Won
2017	AACTA Award	Best Supporting Actor	Ali's Wedding	Nominated
