= Leverne McDonnell =

Australian actress

- Born: Leverne Ann McDonnell; 27 June 1963; Australia
- Died: 15 March 2013 (aged 49); Trentham, Victoria, Australia
- Occupation: Actress

Leverne Ann McDonnell (27 June 1963 – 15 March 2013) was an Australian actress.

== Early life ==
McDonnell spent three years as a member of "Energy Connection", a youth dance theatre company in Adelaide, South Australia, until she was admitted to the National Institute of Dramatic Art in Sydney. She graduated from NIDA in 1985.

== Career ==
In 1992, McDonnell played the role of Kelly in the 1992 ABC police drama series Phoenix—a role for which she was nominated for an AFI Award for Best Performance by an Actress in a Leading Role in a Television Drama. She played a different role, Detective Sergeant Jan Murray, in Janus, a spin-off of Phoenix.

Other television credits include the television series Halfway Across the Galaxy and Turn Left, Chances, The Secret Life of Us, Horace & Tina and The Saddle Club; and the mini-series The Dirtwater Dynasty, Come In Spinner and Simone de Beauvoir's Babies.

Her film appearances included roles in Oscar and Lucinda (1997) and The Interview (1998).

In 2008, McDonnell played the leading role of Detective Inspector Gina Sturrock in the feature film Four of a Kind, a film on she was also the Associate Producer.

== Filmography ==
=== Film ===
| Year | Title | Role | Type |
|---|---|---|---|
| 1988 | Belinda | Auditioning Girl | Feature film |
| 1992 | The Distant Home | Senior Nursing Sister | TV movie |
| 1993 | Gross Misconduct | Miriam McMahon | Feature film |
| 1993 | Mr Electric | | Short film |
| 1997 | Oscar and Lucinda | Miss Malcolm | Feature film |
| 1998 | The Interview | Solicitor | Feature film |
| 2007 | The King | Graham's Mum | TV movie |
| 2008 | Four of a Kind | Detective Inspector Gina Sturrock | Feature film (also Associate Producer) |
| 2014 | All in Her Stride | Herself | Video (also Co-producer) |

=== Television ===
| Year | Title | Role | Type |
|---|---|---|---|
| 1987 | Sons and Daughters | Sherry Devine | TV series, 2 episodes |
| 1988 | The Dirtwater Dynasty | Christine Candy | TV miniseries, 2 episodes |
| 1998 | Captain James Cook | Mary Burnett | TV miniseries, 1 episode |
| 1990 | Come In Spinner | Ursula Cronin | TV miniseries, 4 episodes |
| 1991 | Rafferty’s Rules | Bernadine Nelson | TV series, 1 episode |
| 1991 | Chances | Phillipa Taylor | TV series, 61 episodes |
| 1992 | Phoenix | Kelly | TV series, 1 episode |
| 1992 | Acropolis Now | Whitney | TV series, 1 episode |
| 1994 | Halfway Across the Galaxy and Turn Left | Jady 2 | TV series, 6 episodes |
| 1995 | Halifax f.p. | Gillian Moffatt | TV series, 1 episode |
| 1994–95 | Janus | Detective Sergeant Jan Murray | TV series, 13 episodes |
| 1996 | Naked: Stories of Men | Joan | TV series, 1 episode |
| 1997 | Water Rats | Stella Morgan | TV series, 1 episode |
| 1997 | Blue Heelers | Deanna Delbridge | TV series, 2 episodes |
| 1997 | State Coroner | Vicky Bennett | TV series, 1 episode |
| 1997 | Simone de Beauvoir's Babies | Dianne | TV miniseries, 4 episodes |
| 2001 | The Secret Life of Us | Kelly's Boss | TV series, 6 episodes |
| 2001 | Horace & Tina | Miss Blood | TV series, 5 episodes |
| 2002–03 | Stingers | Dr Holt / Dr Scarff | TV series, 2 episodes |
| 2008 | Bed of Roses | Robyn | TV series, 2 episodes |
| 2008–09 | The Saddle Club | Dr. Judith 'Judy' Barker | TV series, season 3, 3 episodes |

== Theatre ==
| Year | Title | Role | Type |
|---|---|---|---|
| 1984 | Holidaymakers | Sonya | NIDA Theatre, Sydney |
| 1984 | Three French Farces: Legacy | Lisette | NIDA Theatre, Sydney |
| 1984 | Richard III | Buckingham | NIDA Theatre, Sydney |
| 1985 | A Dream Play | | NIDA Parade Theatre, Sydney |
| 1985 | Chamber Music | Circus Style Performer | NIDA Theatre, Sydney |
| 1985 | The Greeks Play 1 The War | | NIDA Parade Theatre, Sydney |
| 1985 | Once in a Lifetime | Circus Style Performer | NIDA Parade Theatre, Sydney |
| 1986 | Hamlet | | Phillip Street Theatre, Sydney |
| 1987 | Emerald City | | The New England Theatre Company |
| 1988 | Cowgirls and Indians | | NIDA Parade Theatre, Sydney |
| 1990 | Operation Holy Mountain | | Q Theatre, Penrith |
| 1990 | The Government Investigator | | Q Theatre, Penrith |
| 1995 | Aftershocks | Elaine / Marg / Julie | Fairfax Studio with MTC |
| 1997 | Jungfrau | Dr Eve Blakemore | Malthouse Theatre, Melbourne with Playbox Theatre Company |

== Personal life and death ==
McDonnell died on 15 March 2013, aged 49, in Melbourne, after a year-long battle with pancreatic cancer.

A documentary about her life and death, called All In Her Stride, was completed in 2014, with McDonnell as a co-producer.
