= The Broken Shore =

The Broken Shore may refer to:

- The Broken Shore (novel), a 2005 novel by Peter Temple
- The Broken Shore (film), a 2014 television movie adaptation of the novel
