= The Big Hurt (disambiguation) =

The Big Hurt is a nickname of Frank Thomas (born 1968), a retired American baseball player.

The Big Hurt may also refer to:

- The Big Hurt (film), an Australian 1986 low-budget thriller
- "The Big Hurt" (song), a popular 1959 song written by Wayne Shanklin and sung by Miss Toni Fisher
- Stan Williams (baseball), MLB pitcher from 1958 to 1972, nicknamed "The Big Hurt"
