= Alison Nisselle =

Australian writer and producer (1943–2023)

- Born: Alison Lempriere Smith; 26 April 1943; Perth, Western Australia, Australia
- Died: 15 November 2023 (aged 80); Elsternwick, Victoria, Australia
- Occupations: Writer; producer; journalist
- Years active: 1977–2021
- Known for: Phoenix; Janus; Zoo Family

Alison Nisselle OAM (26 April 1943 - 15 November 2023) was an Australian writer, screenwriter, and producer, best known for co-creating the crime drama TV series Phoenix and Janus, creating the children's TV series Zoo Family, and writing the feature films Curtin, Healing, and Parer's War.

== Early life and education ==
Nisselle was born Alison Lempriere Smith on 26 April 1943 in Perth, Western Australia.

== Career ==
Before beginning her career as a filmmaker, Nisselle worked as a journalist for the Herald Sun and Channel 7, and then as a military researcher on period drama TV series The Sullivans. While working on The Sullivans, Nisselle's depth of research on cryptographic techniques employed by the classified Z Special Unit resulted in an inadvertent breach of the Official Secrets Act (UK).

Nisselle drew local and international acclaim for her role as co-creator and writer of the groundbreaking crime dramas Phoenix and Janus, which depicted complex and realistic relationships between police and criminals and has been identified as an early forerunner to later dramas like The Wire.

Nisselle worked as a screenwriter, producer, script editor, and script producer across a career spanning over four decades, drawing particular praise for the research-driven realism and accuracy she brought to her work.

== Awards and recognition ==
Awards and commendations for works created or written by Nisselle include TV Week Logie Awards for Phoenix, Janus (which also received a Human Rights TV Drama Award from the Australian Human Rights Commission), and Curtin and a Queensland Premier's Literary Award for Healing.

In 2016, Nisselle received the inaugural Jan Sardi Award as part of Film Victoria's 2016 Screen Leader Awards for her significant achievement as a screenwriter and was recognised in the 2018 Queen's Birthday Honours with a Medal of the Order of Australia (OAM).

== Death ==
Nisselle died on 15 November 2023 in Elsternwick, Victoria.

Following her death, the Australian Writers' Guild released a statement praising Nisselle as "...a towering figure among the generation of writers without whom today's film and television industry would not exist. She will be remembered not only for her vast and varied body of work, and her numerous accolades and awards, but also for her warmth and wit. She was a brilliant writer, editor, creator, producer and, to many of us, a wise and generous mentor".

== Filmography ==
=== Film ===
Title	Year	Credited as	Notes			
Title	Year	Credited as	Notes	The Interview	1998	Script editor
Healing	2014	Co-writer	with Craig Monahan			

=== Television ===
Title	Year	Credited as	Notes			
Title	Year	Credited as	Notes	The Box	1977	Writer (1 episode)
The John Sullivan Story	1979	Researcher	TV Movie			
Skyways (TV series)	1979-1981	Writer (5 episodes)				
Carson's Law	1983	Writer (3 episodes)				
Zoo Family	1985	Creator; Writer (3 episodes)				
Prisoner (TV series)	1986	Writer (9 episodes); Story editor (6 episodes)	Series finale			
Sons and Daughters	1987	Story editor (1 episode)	Series finale			
The Flying Doctors	1985–1988	Writer (2 episodes); Story development (3 episodes)				
G.P.	1990	Story development (3 episodes)				
Street Angels (1991 film)	1991	Writer	TV movie			
Phoenix	1992–1993	Co-creator; Writer (6 episodes)	with Tony McDonald			
Janus	1994–1995	Co-creator; Co-producer; Writer (1 episode)	with Tony McDonald			
The Feds: Betrayal	1996	Writer	with Tony McDonald; TV movie as part of The Feds (miniseries)			
The Feds: Deadfall	1996	Writer	TV movie as part of The Feds (miniseries)			
Ocean Girl	1994–1996	Writer (3 episodes)				
Ship to Shore	1996	Writer (3 episodes)				
Thunderstone	1999	Writer (2 episodes)				
Marshall Law	2002	Co-creator; Writer (17 episodes)	with Rick Held and Bevan Lee			
Blue Heelers	2004	Writer (1 episode)				
headLand	2005	Writer (1 episode)				
Home and Away	1988–2006	Writer (39 episodes)				
Curtin	2007	Writer	TV movie			
Bed of Roses	2010	Script editor (7 episodes)				
Hawke	2010	Script editor	TV movie			
The Mystery of a Hansom Cab	2012	Script editor	TV movie			
Reef Doctors	2013	Story producer				
Parer's War	2014	Writer				
Newton's Law	2017	Script executive (ABC)				
Seven Types of Ambiguity	2017	Script executive (ABC)				
Bloom	2019	Story editor (6 episodes); Writer (1 episode)				
