= Truth (novel) =

2009 crime novel by Peter Temple

- Author: Peter Temple
- Language: English
- Genre: Crime fiction
- Publisher: Text Publishing, Australia
- Publication date: November 2009
- Publication place: Australia
- Media type: Print (hardback & paperback)
- Pages: 352 pp
- ISBN: 978-1-921520-71-6
- OCLC: 424498122
- Preceded by: The Broken Shore

Truth is a 2009 crime fiction novel written by Peter Temple. The novel is a sequel to Temple's 2005 novel The Broken Shore, and won the Miles Franklin Award in 2010.

The book is set around the time of the Black Saturday bushfires in Victoria. Temple was in the process of writing the book, set during a hot bushfire-prone season, when the fires occurred. The disaster almost stopped him continuing, saying "I wasn't quite sure how to cope with that. I wasn't sure what kind of book I would write."

== Plot synopsis ==
Truth's central character is Inspector Stephen Villani (who had appeared in The Broken Shore but not as a major character), acting head of the Victoria Police homicide squad. Already under a cloud over the deaths of two Aboriginal boys during a botched police operation, and a series of unsolved cases, Villani finds the certainties of his life crumbling after the discovery of a murdered woman in an exclusive apartment block.

== Awards ==
Truth was nominated for a Ned Kelly Award for crime fiction, however Temple withdrew the novel from contention, saying that he wished to "clear some small space for the many talented crime writers who haven't won a Ned or been shortlisted", having won five "Neds" since his debut novel Bad Debts in 1997.

In 2009, Truth was one of six novels shortlisted for the Miles Franklin Award, a prestigious Australian literary prize. On 21 June 2010, it was announced that it had won the prize, becoming the first crime genre novel to be nominated and to win the award. The Miles Franklin judges described Truth as "a stunning novel about contemporary Australian life, written with all the ambiguity and moral sophistication of the most memorable literature".
