= Shooting Star (Temple novel) =

Novel by Peter Temple

- First edition
- Author: Peter Temple
- Language: English
- Genre: crime novel
- Publisher: Bantam, Australia
- Publication date: 1999
- Publication place: Australia
- Media type: Print (Paperback)
- Pages: 259 pp
- ISBN: 0-7338-0158-7
- OCLC: 45151237
- Preceded by: An Iron Rose
- Followed by: Black Tide

Shooting Star (1999) is a Ned Kelly Award-winning novel by Australian author Peter Temple.

== Dedication ==
"For Nicholas - with thanks for all the joy."

== Plot ==
Frank Calder, an ex-soldier whose post-military career as a police hostage negotiator ended after he got into a physical altercation with a sadistic fellow officer, now works as a private mediator. Outwardly a hardened loner, on the inside, he nurtures demons from his military days and is plagued by constant self-doubt. When the novel opens, Frank has just taken a job with the very rich Carson family—they need Frank to negotiate with the kidnappers who abducted 15-year-old Anne Carson on her way home from school.

== Awards ==
- Ned Kelly Awards for Crime Writing, Best Novel, 2000: winner

== Notes ==
This novel has also been published in UK by Quercus (2008), Germany (2008 by Bertelsmann), Poland (2009 by Amber), France (2010), and Japan (2012).

== Reviews ==
On the "AustCrime" website Karen Chisholm had this to say about the Text Publishing reprint of the novel in 2019: "Shooting Star has always been a masterclass in thriller execution. Sparse, cleverly paced, littered with clues that make for many 'of course' proclamations, there isn't a wasted moment in all 232 pages. It's about the cleverness of the observations of the characters, but it's also about the tightness of the plot and the way that the hints are there for the identifying. Temple was never a writer to treat his readers with disdain, so there's respect for those reading, as well as those telling the story. And then there are the little touches, the turns of phrase that show you how his characters, think, behave, interact, never in an overbearing manner, often with dry wit and wry humour."

Publishers Weekly called it a "gritty, well-executed tale of greed and vengeance."
