= White Dog (Temple novel) =

Novel by Peter Temple

- First edition
- Author: Peter Temple
- Language: English
- Series: Jack Irish series
- Genre: crime novel
- Publisher: Text Publishing, Australia
- Publication date: 2003
- Publication place: Australia
- Media type: Print (paperback)
- Pages: 337
- ISBN: 1-877008-53-2
- Preceded by: In the Evil Day
- Followed by: The Broken Shore

White Dog is a 2003 Australian novel by Peter Temple. The fourth novel in the "Jack Irish" series, it won the 2003 Ned Kelly Awards Best Novel for Crime Writing.

== Plot summary ==
A Melbourne property developer is murdered and his artist ex-girlfriend is the prime suspect. Jack Irish, a lone private investigator, comes in to investigate. In his investigation, he figures out quite the surprise.

== Style and subject matter ==
Reviewer Hutchings describes the novel as "classic detective fiction" typified by its first-person narrative and "engagement with the city". Hutchings also suggests that "the sense of times past" conveyed by Temple in this novel is central to other writers in this genre, such as Raymond Chandler whose hero, Philip Marlowe, is "an anachronistic knight-errant, a defender of past decencies". He suggests that for Temple, along with the Australian crime writers Marele Day, Peter Corris and Cathy Cole, "the detective offers a link to a disappearing working-class, egalitarian Australia".

As in all his Jack Irish novels, Australian Rules Football and horse racing feature in The White Dog.

== Publishing history ==
After the novel's original publication by Text Publishing in 2003, it was reprinted by Text in 2004, 2014 and 2018.

In the United Kingdom it was published by Quercus in 2007, and reprinted in 2012.

== See also ==
- 2003 in Australian literature
