= Street Angels (1991 film) =

- Written by: Alison Nisselle
- Directed by: Kathy Mueller
- Starring: Peta Brady; David Franklin; Alexandra Sangster
- Country of origin: Australia
- Original language: English

Production
- Producer: Kim Dalton
- Running time: 80 minutes
- Production company: ABC

Original release
- Release: 1991

Street Angels is a 1991 Australian television film directed by Kathy Mueller and starring Peta Brady, David Franklin, and Alexandra Sangster. It is about two social workers dealing with young children.

== Cast ==
- Peta Brady as Chrissie
- David Franklin as Tim
- Alexandra Sangster as Donna
- Lynne McGranger as Joan
- Mickey Camilleri as Pat
- George Zach as Bill
