= Zoo Family =

Television series

- Created by: Alison Nisselle
- Country of origin: Australia
- No. of episodes: 26

Production
- Producer: Gwenda Marsh
- Production company: Crawford Productions

Original release
- Network: Nine Network
- Release: 23 June 1985 – 1985

Zoo Family is an Australian children's television series broadcast on the Nine Network on 23 June 1985. The series was produced by Crawford Productions and filmed at the Melbourne Zoo. It was later shown in reruns on Nickelodeon in the United States.

== Synopsis ==
Zoo Vet Dr. David Mitchell and his children Nick and Susie make the Royal Melbourne Zoo their home.

== Cast ==
=== Main / regular ===
- Peter Curtin as Dr. David 'Mitch' Mitchell
- Steven Jacobson as Nicholas Mitchell
- Kate Gorman as Susie Mitchell
- Rebecca Gibney as Julie Davis
- Jon Finlayson as Col. Archibald Spencer
- John Orcsik as Ken Bennett
- Robert Summers as Tim Watson
- Marion Heathfield as Mrs. Spencer
- Gennie Nevinson as Peta Hamilton

=== Guests ===
- Ben Mendelsohn as Martin (1 episode)
- Bruce Spence as George (1 episode)
- Fiona Corke as Fiona (1 episode)
- John McTernan as Mr Macleod (1 episode)
- Julia Blake as Mrs Watson (1 episode)
- Kylie Minogue as Yvonne (1 episode)
- Marion Edward as Mona Vale (1 episode)
- Max Phipps as Elephant Jim (1 episode)
- Nigel Bradshaw as Bernie Barker (1 episode)
- Rachel Friend as Susie's friend (1 episode)
- Tommy Dysart as McGregor (1 episode)
- Tony Martin as Manuel (1 episode)
- Vince Colosimo (1 episode)

== See also ==
- List of Australian television series
