= Parer's War =

- Based on: "Kokoda Front Line" by Neil McDonald
- Written by: Alison Nisselle
- Directed by: Alister Grierson
- Starring: Matthew Le Nevez; Adelaide Clemens; Rob Carlton; Luke Ford; Alexander England; Nicholas Bell
- Music by: Cezary Skubiszewski
- Country of origin: Australia
- Original language: English

Production
- Producer: Andrew Wiseman
- Cinematography: Mark Wareham
- Running time: 100 minutes

Original release
- Network: ABC
- Release: 27 April 2014 (Australia)

Parer's War is a 2014 television film about Damien Parer, the Australian war photographer whose Second World War documentary film Kokoda Front Line! documenting the Kokoda Track campaign was the first Australian film to win an Oscar at the 15th Academy Awards.

== Plot ==
The film opens in 1942 with Parer in Mubo, New Guinea filming Australian troops during the Kokoda Track Campaign and covers the production of Kokoda Front Line!, his relationship with his wife Marie, events leading to his redeployment, and his subsequent death by Japanese gunfire at Palau in September 1944.

== Cast ==
- Matthew Le Nevez as Damien Parer
- Adelaide Clemens as Marie Cotter
- Rob Carlton as Ken G. Hall
- Luke Ford as Ronnie Williams
- Alexander England as Chester Wilmot
- Nicholas Bell as Bob Hawes
- Nathaniel Dean as Major George Warfe
- Khan Chittenden as Captain Fred 'Doc' Street
- T. J. Power as Lieutenant Johnny Lewin
- James Ivor as Lieutenant Jock Erskine
- Joshua Brennan as Corporal Scotty McMillan
- Ian Meadows as Terry Banks
- Lindsay Farris as Max Dupain
- Toby Wallace as Lieutenant Ron 'Judy' Garland
- Kevin MacIsaac as Captain Norm Winning
- Marco Chiappi as Lt. General Sydney Rowell
- A.J. Garrett as George Weller
- Christopher Sommers as Dr. Bill McLean
- Alan David Lee as Father English

== Production ==
Director Alister Grierson utilised point-of-view shots centred on Parer's camera throughout the film and shot scenes set in New Guinea on-location at Tamborine Mountain in Queensland.
