= Nina Landis =

Australian actress

- Born: Melbourne, Victoria, Australia
- Occupation: Actress
- Years active: 1978–2014

Nina Landis is an Australian stage and screen actress, who trained in Australia and New York.

== Early life ==
Landis studied drama at Flinders University, Adelaide in the mid to late 1970s.

== Career ==
Landis' feature film credits include the title role (Rikky) in Rikky and Pete, Komodo, Four of a Kind, Handle with Care, and Blackjack: Sweet Science.

Her principal roles on television include Embassy, Prime Time, The Keepers, One Summer Again, MDA, The Flying Doctors, Prisoner, A Country Practice.

She has performed on the stages of national theatre companies and fringe theatres.

Landis also lectures on acting, is a voice-over artist, and a documentary photographer.

== Filmography ==
=== Film ===
Year	Title	Role	Type
1980	Nightmares	Judy	Feature film
1985	Niel Lynne	Helen	Feature film
1987	To Market to Market	Samantha	Feature film
1988	Rikky and Pete	Rikky Menzies	Feature film
1991	Antamosi		Film short
1997	True Love and Chaos	Affirmation Voice	Feature film
1999	Komodo	Aunt Annie	Feature film
2008	Four of a Kind	Susan	Feature film
2008	Not Quite Hollywood: The Wild, Untold Story of Ozploitation!	Herself	Feature film documentary

=== Television ===
Year	Title	Role	Type
1981; 1984	Cop Shop	Ellen Shannon	TV series, 3 episodes
1981	Prisoner	Michelle Parkes	TV series, 5 episodes
1981; 1993	A Country Practice	Sandra Popovich	TV series, 2 episodes
1982	The Sullivans	Guest role: Molly	TV series
1984	The Keepers	Miriam Woods	TV series, 9 episodes
1984	Special Squad	Lisa	TV series, episode 10: "Duel"
1984	Carson's Law		TV series, 1 episode
1985	One Summer Again	Clara Southern	TV miniseries
1985	Handle with Care	Julie	TV film
1986	Prime Time	Kate MacArthur	TV series
1987	Always Afternoon	Renata Stein	TV miniseries, 1 episode
1988	Rafferty's Rules	Jan Mondale	TV series, 1 episode
1990	The Flying Doctors	Megan Price	TV series, 1 episode
1990	Embassy	Susan Derek	TV pilot
1990–91	Embassy	Susan Derek	TV series, 25 episodes
1992	The Late Show	Sally Bowen	TV series, 1 episode
1993	A Country Practice		TV series, 2 episodes
1994–97	Ocean Girl	H.E.L.E.N. (voice)	TV series, 78 episodes
1999	Thunderstone	Syndia	TV series, 19 episodes
2002–03	MDA	Claudia Montserrat	TV series, 12 episodes
2003	Wilderness	Narrator	Film documentary
2004	BlackJack: Sweet Science	Stella Anderson	TV film series
2008	The Hollowmen		TV series, 1 episode
2008	City Homicide	Valerie Zimmerman	TV series, 2 episodes
2009	Liquid Stone: Unlocking Gaudi's Secret	Narrator	Film documentary
2014	Neighbours	Judge Lockwood	TV series, 1 episode
2015	Little Stars	Narrator	Film documentary

== Stage ==
Year	Title	Role	Type
	Hotel Baltimore	Suzy	Drama Centre, Adelaide
	Dracula	Lucy	Drama Centre, Adelaide
	The Trial	Mrs Burstner	Drama Centre, Adelaide
	Lysistrata	Lampito	Dodd Street Theatre, Melbourne
	Dōjōji (The Dancer)	The Dancer	Drama Centre, Adelaide
1978	Oedipus the King / Oedipus at Colonus	Suppliants / Guards / Attendants	The Playhouse, Adelaide with STCSA for Adelaide Festival
1979	Hamlet		The Playhouse, Adelaide, with STCSA
1979	The Shaughraun	Moya	The Playhouse, Adelaide, with STCSA
1979	Summer of the Seventeenth Doll	Bubba	STCSA
1980	Errol Flynn's Great Big Adventure Book for Boys	Lois	Space Theatre, Adelaide & Edinburgh Festival with The Stage Company
1981	Covenant of the Rainbow	Art	La Mama, Melbourne
1982	Degrees of Change		
1984	Scapin	Zerbinetta	Hoyts Prince Theatre, Hobart, Studio Theatre, Melbourne with Playbox Theatre Company
1992	No Going Back	Ruth	Russell Street Theatre, Melbourne, with MTC
1993	Blood Moon	Katina	Theatre Works, Melbourne
1994	Wounds to the Face	The Mother	Theatre Works, Melbourne, with Black Box Theatre Company
2023	Way	Voice Over Artist	La Mama, Melbourne
