= Peta Brady =

Australian actress

- Born: 17 July 1972 (age 54); Melbourne, Victoria, Australia
- Education: University of Ballarat
- Occupations: Actress, writer
- Years active: 1991–present
- Known for: Neighbours

Peta Brady (born 1972) is an Australian actress, known for her role as Cody Willis in Neighbours.

== Early life ==
Brady grew up in Melbourne. She first gravitated towards acting and writing during her high school years, where she wrote some scenes for a school production. Following high school, she studied performing arts at the University of Ballarat.

== Career ==
Brady's first screen role was the lead in the 1991 television film Street Angels. She plays street kid Chrissie, who is a victim of incest. She appears in the 1994 coming-of-age film Only the Brave as Tammy. She is perhaps best known for being the second actress, after Amelia Frid, to play Cody Willis in the television soap opera Neighbours from 1993 until 1996. After leaving Neighbours, Brady initially struggled to find acting work, but in 1997, she played Dianne in Simone de Beauvoir's Babies and filmed an appearance in Raw FM.

Brady has appeared in the feature films Mullet (2001) and Pawno (2016) as well as numerous short films and tv movies. She has had roles in several miniseries, including Fat Cow Motel (2003), RAN (Remote Area Nurse) (2006) and The Slap (2011).

Brady has had recurring roles as Kelly in the TV sitcom Kath & Kim, Rosie Day in drama series Big Sky (1999), and Janine Ballich in Jack Irish (2016-2021). She has also had numerous guest roles in television series such as Phoenix (1993), Good Guys Bad Guys (1997), Blue Heelers (1997 & 2003), MDA (2003), City Homicide (2008 & 2009), The Librarians (2009 & 2010), Rush (2010), It' a Date (2014), House Husbands (2015), Safe Home (2023) and Fake (2023)

Brady played the character of Annie in 2005 stage production Love by Australian playwright Patricia Cornelius, which won her the Gerda Nicholson Award for an 'Actress with an Emerging Career' at the 2005 Green Room Awards. The first play she wrote, Status Update (2010), received two Green Room Awards nominations, including 'Best New Writing for the Melbourne Stage', and 'Best Female Performer'. Her play Strands receive funding from the R.E Ross Trust Award in 2011. Brady performed in five seasons of Patricia Cornelius’s award winning play Shit, receiving the 2016 Green Room Award for Best Ensemble.

In 2011, Brady had been working for the Salvation Army as a mobile health, alcohol and drug safety outreach worker on weekends for about ten years, as a secondary source of income.

== Filmography ==
=== Film ===
Year	Title	Role	Type
1994	Only the Brave	Tammy	Short film
1997	Pepper	Alice	Short film
2001	Mullet	Robbie	Feature film
2013	The Turning	Mrs Larwood	Anthology film, segment: "Cockleshell"
2015	Pawno	Kylie	Feature film
2018	Incubator	Mum	Short film
2021	Some Happy Day	Tina	Also producer
2023	Shit	Sam	Feature film
2023	Cold Water	Police Officer	Short film

=== Television ===
Year	Title	Role	Type
1991	Street Angels	Chrissie	TV movie
1993	Phoenix	Mandy	TV series, 1 episode
1993–1996	Neighbours	Cody Willis	Series regular
1997	Good Guys Bad Guys	Susie Crake	TV series, 2 episodes
1997	Raw FM	Jemma	TV series, 1 episode
1997	Simone de Beauvoir’s Babies	Diane, age 17	Miniseries, 4 episodes
1997–2003	Blue Heelers	Anise Lightfoot / Margaret Todd	TV series, 6 episodes
1999	Big Sky	Rosie Day	TV series, season 2, 12 episodes
1999	Pig's Breakfast	Nancy	TV series
2000	Dogwoman: A Girl’s Best Friend	Parsley	TV movie
2002–2004	Kath & Kim	Kelly	TV series, 4 episodes
2003	The Forest	Emily	TV movie
2003	Fat Cow Motel	Diane	Miniseries, 2 episodes
2003	MDA	Melissa Morrice	TV series, 2 episodes
2005	Da Kath & Kim Code	Kelly	TV movie
2006	RAN (Remote Area Nurse)	Lindy Gaibui	Miniseries, 6 episodes
2008–2009	City Homicide	Kim Charlton	TV series, seasons 1 & 2, 2 episodes
2009	Four of a Kind	Young Gina	TV movie
2009	Whatever Happened to That Guy	Louise	TV series, 1 episode
2009–2010	The Librarians	Marzena Stovic	TV series, 2 episodes
2010	Rush	Linda	TV series, 1 episode
2011	The Slap	Shamira	Miniseries, 2 episodes
2012	Beaconsfield	Jacqui Knight	TV movie
2014	It’s a Date	Max	TV series, 1 episode
2015	House Husbands	Tania	TV series, 1 episode
2016–2021	Jack Irish	Janine Ballich	TV series, 4 episodes
2023	Safe Home	Hila	TV series, 2 episodes
2023	Fake	Milena	TV series, 1 episode
2024	The Newsreader	Daniela Aranz	TV series, season 2

== Theatre ==
=== As actor ===
Year	Title	Role	Venue / Theatre
1997	The Essentials		Trades Hall, Melbourne with Zeal Theatre
1998	Shark Fin Soup	Robyn Pike	Fairfax Studio, Melbourne with MTC
1999	Diving for Pearls	Verge	Albury Convention & Performing Arts Centre with MTC & HotHouse Theatre
2001	The Rain Dancers	Kat	Fairfax Studio, Melbourne with MTC
2004	Mouse	Max (self-devised)	Zeal Theatre
2005	The Secret Place	Chloe	Zeal Theatre / STC
2005	Love	Annie	Butter Factory Theatre, Wodonga, Malthouse Theatre, Melbourne with HotHouse Theatre; Won Gerda Nicholson Award for Emerging Actor at Green Room Awards
2006	Room Service	Girl in Hotel	Melbourne Writers Festival
2006	Sugar Mountain		Cinema Nova, Melbourne
2007	The Call	Denise	Fairfax Studio, Melbourne with Melbourne Workers Theatre
2008	Zombie State	Persephone	University of Melbourne with Melbourne Workers Theatre
2009	The Water Carriers	Kate	Southbank Theatre, Melbourne with MTC
2009	Entanglement		Carlton Courthouse, Melbourne with La Mama
2010	Status Update	Eve	La Mama, Melbourne for Melbourne Fringe Festival; Nominated for Best Actor at Green Room Awards
2010	War Crimes	Ricky	Playwrights Conference
2011	Save for Crying	Luv	La Mama, Melbourne; Nominated for Best Actress in Independent Theatre at 2011 Green Room Awards
2011	Strands		La Mama, Melbourne; Nominated for Best Actor at Green Room Awards
2013	Coranderrk	Various roles	Ilbijerri Theatre Company
2014	Ugly Mugs	Working Girl / Mum	Malthouse Theatre, Melbourne, Stables Theatre, Sydney with Griffin Theatre Company; Nominated for Best Actor at Green Room Awards
2014; 2018	The House of Bernada Alba	Angela	Fairfax Studio, Melbourne with MTC
2015; 2016; 2017; 2018; 2019	Shit	Sam	Southbank Theatre, Melbourne with MTC, Darwin Festival, Fortyfivedownstairs, Melbourne, Seymour Centre, Sydney for Sydney Festival, Butter Factory Theatre, Wodonga with HotHouse Theatre, Venice Biennale, Edinburgh Festival; Won 5 Green Room Awards including Best Ensemble
2017	Trustees	Lesley / Peta	Belarus Theatre / Malthouse Theatre, Melbourne
2019	Dogged (reading)	Main cast	Playwriting Australia

=== As writer ===
Year	Title	Role	Venue / Theatre
2009	Entanglement	Playwright	Carlton Courthouse, Melbourne with La Mama
2010	Status Update	Playwright	La Mama, Melbourne for Melbourne Fringe Festival; Nominated for Best Writing at Green Room Awards
2011	Strands	Playwright	La Mama, Melbourne; Nominated for Best New Writing for Stage at Green Room Awards
2014	Ugly Mugs	Playwright	Malthouse Theatre, Melbourne, Stables Theatre, Sydney; Nominated for Best Writer at Green Room Awards

== Radio ==
Year	Title	Role	Company
	The Farm		ABC Radio National
2007	Great Ocean Road	Tracey	ABC Radio National
2007	Bantam: A Real Book	Performer	ABC Radio National
2009	Good	Sylvie	ABC Radio National
2010	Poetry	Various roles	ABC Radio
2010	Oxygen	Performer	ABC Radio
2010	Water Carriers	Performer	ABC Radio

== Awards ==
Year	Association	Category	Work	Result
2005	Green Room Awards	Gerda Nicholson Award for Emerging Actor	Love	Won
2010	Green Room Awards	Best New Writing for the Melbourne Stage	Status Update	Nominated
2010	Green Room Awards	Best Female Performer	Status Update	Nominated
2011	Green Room Awards	Best Actor	Strands	Nominated
2011	Green Room Awards	Best New Writing	Strands	Nominated
2011	Green Room Awards	Best Actress in Independent Theatre	Save for Crying	Nominated
2014	Green Room Awards	Best Actor	Ugly Mugs	Nominated
2014	Green Room Awards	Best Writer	Ugly Mugs	Nominated
2016	Green Room Awards	Best Ensemble	Shit	Won
