= The Interview (1998 film) =

- Film poster.
- Directed by: Craig Monahan
- Written by: Craig Monahan; Gordon Davie
- Produced by: Bill Hughes
- Starring: Hugo Weaving; Tony Martin; Aaron Jeffery
- Cinematography: Simon Duggan
- Edited by: Suresh Ayyar
- Music by: David Hirschfelder
- Distributed by: Sullivan Entertainment; The Cinema Guild; Umbrella Entertainment
- Release date: 20 August 1998
- Running time: 103 minutes
- Country: Australia
- Language: English
- Box office: $556,264

The Interview is a 1998 Australian psychological thriller film from writer-director Craig Monahan, and is the first of three films directed by Monahan: The Interview, Healing, and a 2024 adaptation of David Williamson's The Removalists. Almost the entire film takes place in a police interrogation room, with some short flashback sequences, and the cast consists primarily of three key actors—Hugo Weaving, Tony Martin, and Aaron Jeffery.

== Plot ==
Edward Rodney Fleming (Weaving) is a man living alone after losing his job and wife. One morning, Detective Sergeant John Steele (Martin) and his subordinate, Detective Wayne Prior (Aaron Jeffery), break into Flemming Gambus apartment. They rough Fleming Gambus up, ransack his belongings, and take him to the police station in handcuffs.

Steele and Prior question Fleming in an interrogation room. The police claim a witness saw Fleming with Andrew Beecroft, the owner of a stolen car. They also claim Fleming's handwriting matches the writing on some forged sales correspondence between Beecroft and a fake buyer, and that the fake buyer's alias matches an alias Fleming used as a teenager to steal a car for a joyride. Fleming denies any knowledge of the theft and only meekly asks for food, as he has not eaten since the previous day. Steele offers false expressions of empathy, while Prior intimidates Fleming when the recorder is off.

In between questioning, Detective Inspector Jackson orders Steele to deal with an intrusive reporter, Barry Walls. Steele complains to Walls about how his reckless reporting has previously interfered with police work. Walls shares that he overheard Prior questioning Steele's skills behind his back, to convince Steele he can be useful in return for information. Steele confronts Prior in private, pins him to the wall, and warns him against future disloyalty.

As the interrogation proceeds, Steele reveals to Fleming that the car's owner is missing. Fleming correctly guesses he is suspected of murdering the car's owner, and that the police believe the theft is related to other missing persons cases reported in the news. Fleming asks for a lawyer. While Fleming's lawyer advises him to say nothing until he is released in a few hours, Steele convinces Jackson to give him more time with the Fleming.

Fleming's demeanour grows in confidence. Despite his lawyer's advice, he expresses his belief that the missing persons were murdered, and mocks the police for chasing some kind of overarching motive. Fleming hints that he might have more to share after eating. When Steele finally provides food, Fleming proudly details how Beecroft picked him up while hitchhiking. He decided to kill Beecroft on a whim. He bludgeoned Beecroft after they drank together, and then he took Beecroft's car and wallet after disposing of the body. Fleming also casually admits to killing five or six other victims starting from a few years ago, claiming he cannot be bothered to remember the details although he always beat them to death after hitchhiking with them. Fleming agrees to provide a video-recorded confession as well.

However, during the videotaping, Jackson walks in and asks to speak to Fleming. Fleming immediately recants everything and says he only told Steele and Prior what they wanted to hear because they brutalized him, threatened him, and refused to feed him. Jackson forces Steele and Prior to end the questioning.

Later, Steele is informed that the entire day's interrogation was being filmed without his knowledge, due to an investigation by a police ethics committee after too many suspects made formal complaints about his conduct. The officer in charge of the ethics review, Detective Hudson, determines that Steele's entire interview is inadmissible in court due to suggestions, false promises, intimidation, and other questionable techniques by Steele and Prior.

Steele blames Jackson for ruining the interview and failing to stand up for him, although Jackson offers to testify that Steele tried to reel in Prior's aggression. Convinced of Fleming's guilt and outraged that he will walk free, Steele arranges to secretly give the entire case info and the audio recording of the confession to Walls. Steele tells Walls he does not care about the consequences since he believes he will be fired anyway.

Afterwards, Hudson interviews Steele using another audio recorder. Steele accuses Hudson of a personal grudge, as Hudson led previous ethics investigations against him, too. Hudson turns off the recorder, angrily insults Steele, and tells him he will make sure he is fired. Unbeknownst to Hudson, Steele had his own recorder running and recorded Hudson's abusive comments. Steele is last seen planning how to use his recording of Hudson to defend himself.

Fleming leaves the station with an ambiguous grin. In the final scene, he is shown hitchhiking again.

== Cast ==
- Hugo Weaving as Edward Gambus Fleming
- Tony Martin as Detective Sergeant Markele
- Aaron Jeffery as Detective Senior Constable Wayne Manuel
- Paul Sonkkila as Detective Inspector Jackson
- Michael Caton as Larry Walls
- Peter McCauley as Detective Hudson
- Glynis Angel as Detective Robran
- Leverne McDonnell as Solicitor
- Libby Stone as Mrs. Beecroft
- Andrew Bayly as Constable Prowse
- Doug Dew as Andrew Beecroft

== Accolades ==
| Award | Category | Subject | Result |
|---|---|---|---|
| AACTA Awards (1998 AFI Awards) | Best Film | Bill Hughes | Won |
| AACTA Awards (1998 AFI Awards) | Best Direction | Craig Monahan | Nominated |
| AACTA Awards (1998 AFI Awards) | Best Original Screenplay | Craig Monahan | Won |
| AACTA Awards (1998 AFI Awards) | Best Original Screenplay | Gordon Davie | Won |
| AACTA Awards (1998 AFI Awards) | Best Actor | Hugo Weaving | Won |
| AACTA Awards (1998 AFI Awards) | Best Cinematography | Simon Duggan | Nominated |
| AACTA Awards (1998 AFI Awards) | Best Editing | Suresh Ayyar | Nominated |
| AACTA Awards (1998 AFI Awards) | Best Original Music Score | David Hirschfelder | Nominated |
| AACTA Awards (1998 AFI Awards) | Best Sound | Peter Palankay | Nominated |
| AACTA Awards (1998 AFI Awards) | Best Sound | Peter D. Smith | Nominated |
| AACTA Awards (1998 AFI Awards) | Best Sound | John Wilkinson | Nominated |
| AACTA Awards (1998 AFI Awards) | Best Sound | Steve Witherow | Nominated |
| AACTA Awards (1998 AFI Awards) | Best Production Design | David Hirschfelder | Nominated |
| FCCA Awards | Best Film | Bill Hughes | Nominated |
| FCCA Awards | Best Director | Craig Monahan | Nominated |
| FCCA Awards | Best Original Screenplay | Craig Monahan | Won |
| FCCA Awards | Best Original Screenplay | Gordon Davie | Won |
| FCCA Awards | Best Actor | Hugo Weaving | Nominated |
| FCCA Awards | Best Supporting Actor | Tony Martin | Nominated |
| FCCA Awards | Best Cinematography | Simon Duggan | Won |
| FCCA Awards | Best Music Score | David Hirschfelder | Won |
| Flanders International Film Festival Ghent | Student Jury Award | Craig Monahan | Won |
| Montreal World Film Festival | FIPRESCI Prize – Special Mention | Craig Monahan | Won |
| Montreal World Film Festival | Grand Prix des Amériques | Craig Monahan | Nominated |
| Montreal World Film Festival | Best Actor | Hugo Weaving | Won |
| Torino Film Festival | Prize of the City of Torino for Best Feature Film | Craig Monahan | Nominated |

== Alternate ending ==
An alternate ending of the film was featured on the DVD release. In this version, Eddie Rodney Fleming is seen hitchhiking along a desolate road. A car stops and Barry Walls (Caton) offers him a ride. Fleming accepts and they drive away, followed at a distance by Steele (Martin) on his motorcycle, no doubt intending to enforce some vigilante justice.

== Box office ==
The Interview grossed $556,263 at the box office in Australia.

== Home media ==
The Interview was released on DVD by Umbrella Entertainment in July 2011. The DVD is compatible with all region codes and includes special features such as audio commentary by Craig Monahan, deleted scenes, the alternate ending and cast and crew interviews.

== See also ==
- Cinema of Australia
