= An Iron Rose =

1998 novel by Peter Temple

- First edition
- Author: Peter Temple
- Language: English
- Genre: crime novel
- Publisher: HarperCollins, Australia
- Publication date: 1998
- Publication place: Australia
- Media type: Print (Paperback)
- Pages: 276 pp
- ISBN: 0-7322-5931-2
- OCLC: 38822064
- Preceded by: Bad Debts
- Followed by: Shooting Star

An Iron Rose (1998) is a novel by Australian author Peter Temple.

== Dedication ==
"For Josephine Margaret Temple and Alexander Royden Harold Wakefield Temple : first and best influences."

== Reviews ==
- "Echoes from a Distant Mountain"
- "The Daily Telegraph"
- "Reviewing the Evidence"
