= Black Tide (novel) =

1999 novel by Peter Temple

- First edition
- Author: Peter Temple
- Language: English
- Series: Jack Irish series
- Genre: crime novel
- Publisher: Bantam, Australia
- Publication date: 1999
- Publication place: Australia
- Media type: Print (Paperback)
- Pages: 311 pp
- ISBN: 0-7338-0159-5
- OCLC: 154590687
- Preceded by: Bad Debts
- Followed by: Dead Point

Black Tide (1999) is a crime novel by Australian author Peter Temple. This is the second novel in the author's Jack Irish series.

== Dedication ==
"For Anita, Nicholas, and Louise: the Charity, the Hope, and the Faith."

== Abstract ==
"Jack Irish has no shortage of friends. Jockeys and journos, lawyers and standover men, people in nameless occupations who aren’t in the phone book. These days, though, the only family he sees are Irish men in faded football team photographs on the pub wall. So when Des Connors, the last link to his father, calls to ask for help in the matter of a missing son, Jack is happy to lend a hand. But sometimes prodigal sons go missing for a reason.

"As Jack begins to dig, he discovers that Gary Connors was a man with something to hide. And his friends are people with darker, more deadly secrets." (Publication summary)

== See also ==
- 1999 in Australian literature

== Notes ==
This novel has also been published as follows:

- De Boekerij, 2003, Netherlands, in a Dutch-language edition with a translation by Paul Witte
- MacAdam/Cage, 2005, USA
- Anchor Canada, 2006, Canada
- Quercus, 2008, UK, as part of Bad Debts: A Jack Irish Omnibus
- Wilhelm Goldmann Verlag, 2008, Germany, in a German-language edition

== Reviews ==
- "Australian Crime Fiction Database"
- "Australian Public Intellectual Network"
