= David Bradshaw (actor) =

Australian actor (1947–2021)

David Bradshaw (1947 – November 2021) was an Australian actor.

He appeared in a large number of historical miniseries and movies. He broke two ribs playing The Last Outlaw in a fight scene with John Jarratt. Bradshaw mostly played support parts but had a lead in The Big Hurt.

== Select credits ==
- Cash and Company (1975)
- Felicity (1978)
- Prisoner (1979) Jason Richards Episodes 27-29
- The Last Outlaw (1980)
- I Can Jump Puddles (1981)
- Kitty and the Bagman (1982)
- The Man from Snowy River (1982) - as Banjo Paterson
- Prisoner (1983) Tony Maguire Episodes 390-394
- Anzacs (1985) - as Keith Murdoch
- A Thousand Skies (1985)
- Robbery Under Arms (1985)
- Cool Change (1986)
- The Big Hurt (1986)
- Evil Angels (1988)
- Phoenix (1992)
- Janus (1994)
- Neighbours (2016)
