= Komodo (film) =

1999 Australian horror thriller film

- Film poster
- Directed by: Michael Lantieri
- Written by: Hans Bauer; Craig Mitchell
- Produced by: Alan Riche; Tony Ludwig
- Starring: Jill Hennessy; Billy Burke; Kevin Zegers; Nina Landis; Simon Westaway
- Cinematography: David Burr
- Music by: John Debney
- Distributed by: Scanbox Entertainment
- Release date: September 15, 1999 (Toronto International Film Festival)
- Running time: 90 minutes
- Countries: Australia; United States
- Language: English
- Budget: A$15 million

Komodo is a 1999 Australian horror thriller film directed by Michael Lantieri. Starring Jill Hennessy, Billy Burke, Kevin Zegers, and Nina Landis, the film follows fifteen-year-old Patrick who witnesses his parents get attacked and killed by a strange creature. After working with a psychiatrist to overcome the shock, Patrick and his aunt Annie return to the scene to face the creature responsible for his parents death.

Released in 1999, Komodo received rather poor critical response.

== Plot ==
During the 1980s a black market shipment of exotic animals docks at Emerald Isle, North Carolina. A driver transports several animals to another location. During the drive, he notices a distinctive smell and pulls the van over. He presumes a crate of reptilian eggs are rotten and tosses them into the swamp. Nineteen years later, the Connelly family arrives at the island to return to their vacation home though, in recent years, a major oil company has been polluting the local environment. During their stay, Patrick and his dog, Buster, encounter a small lizard. In an attempt to catch it, Patrick stays out later than usual and his parents go out looking for him. Patrick heads home after hearing his parents calling, but is attacked by an unseen creature. Barely escaping, he witnesses his family being devoured by the creatures. Patrick survives and is found in a state of shock.

Some time later, Patrick's grandmother reaches out to Dr. Victoria Juno, a young psychiatrist, to help Patrick come to terms with his grief. His aunt Annie is indifferent to Victoria's presence and adamantly against him returning to the island. Victoria, with the grandmother's support, takes Patrick back to the island along with Annie. At the Connellys' old vacation home, Annie is attacked and wounded. While Victoria tends to Annie's wounds, Patrick is awakened by growling and comes downstairs. While in the kitchen, he has a flashback to the attack on his dog and runs to Victoria panicked. When she asks him what he saw, he points behind her to reveal a massive Komodo dragon. Annie is killed by the creature and Victoria and Patrick barely escape, revealing that there are several more dragons.

They find the boat captain, Martin, severely injured. Driving frantically, they nearly crash into Oates and his maintenance co-worker Denby (Paul Gleeson), who were sent to kill the reptiles. Oates and Denby tend to Martin, who is succumbing to infection from wounds caused by bacteria in the Komodo's saliva. Oates and Denby call for help from Bracken, the man who sent them to the island to kill the Komodos.

Bracken refuses to take them off the island until they kill all the dragons. Patrick runs off into the long grass. Victoria tries to follow, but is pulled back onto the road by Oates. Denby says that Patrick cut out the heart of a Komodo dragon that had previously been killed. The group travel to the oil company office station to seek shelter and get medicine for Martin. He later dies, as well as Denby, who is attacked in another room. Bracken radios Oates and says a helicopter will be coming soon and that the dragons should be all killed by that time. Oates reveals to Victoria that he was a former biologist and his wife a geologist hired by the oil company to survey the environment; in the field, Oates and his wife are separated and he never sees her again. Police believe Oates killed his wife and with no evidence to prove his innocence, Bracken presented Oates with an escape in return for taking care of the Komodo "problem".

They head off in search of Patrick at his old hang-out, a filtration centre. Separated, Victoria is attacked by one of the Komodos but is saved by Patrick. Patrick runs off again as Victoria is attacked by another Komodo dragon. Meanwhile, Oates is attacked by one of the creatures and manages to kill it; however, he is bitten. He then saves Victoria from the attacking dragon by shooting it. They later find Patrick and Victoria tells him the oil company knew of the Komodos, but covered it up to protect themselves, and that his parents' death was not his fault. Immediately afterwards, one of the remaining Komodos attacks. Oates lures the dragon into leaking oil/gasoline and attempts to kill it by igniting the oil with one of Denby's cigars. The dragon escapes the fire and rushes after Victoria, but she kills it by using a rock to bash part of a broomstick handle into its head that she earlier injured it with.

The helicopter finally arrives with Bracken. Oates turns up at the station alive and steals the helicopter to leave Bracken on the island with the creatures. Victoria and Patrick try to make their way back to Martin's boat when another large Komodo dragon tracks them down. However, Oates flies overhead in the helicopter and shoots a flare gun into the Komodo dragon's mouth, incinerating it. They return to the mainland unharmed. While resting on the sidewalk back in town, the sheriff stops to ask them if everything is all right. Patrick responds "Never better".

== Cast ==
- Jill Hennessy as Dr. Victoria Juno
- Billy Burke as Oates
- Kevin Zegers as Patrick Connelly
- Michael Edward-Steven as Captain Martin Gris
- Paul Gleeson as Denby
- Nina Landis as Aunt Annie
- Simon Westaway as Bracken
- Bruce Hughes as Mr. Connelly
- Jane Conroy as Mrs. Connelly
- Melissa Jaffer as Grandmother
- Brian McDermott as Sheriff Gordon
- Nique Needles as Hippie

== Production ==
The film was shot in Australia.

== Release ==
Komodo had a limited theatrical release in summer 1999 in the United States, with a VHS release in November of the same year. The DVD format of the film followed. The film was distributed by the Eastern limited branch of Scanbox Entertainment, Scanbox Asia Pacific Limited.

The film was theatrically released in France on 19 January 2000.

== Reception ==
A review in TV Guide stated "There's additional undeveloped twaddle about the lizards excreting "a super-infection", plus a "Patrick of the Jungle" subplot that comes out of nowhere and returns there. The relentless monster action one expects form a movie like this actually relents quite a bit, though the CGI and animatronic Komodos are well done and seamlessly interwoven; first-time director Michael Lantieri is a special-effects supervisor and was the dinosaur-effects specialist on the first two JURASSIC PARK movies. Among the actors, Burke shows terrific promise, while Hennessy, unfortunately, has all the emotional range of the lizards." Another review at The Movie Scene was critical of the acting in the film.

== See also ==
Two films that do not appear to have any connection with Komodo beyond featuring similar creatures:

- Curse of the Komodo (2004)
- Komodo vs Cobra (2005)
