= The Broken Shore (film) =

Television adaptation of Peter Temple novel

- Based on: The Broken Shore by Peter Temple
- Written by: Peter Temple
- Screenplay by: Andrew Knight
- Directed by: Rowan Woods
- Starring: Don Hany; Damon Herriman; Claudia Karvan
- Theme music composer: Cezary Skubiszewski
- Country of origin: Australia
- Original language: English

Production
- Producers: Ian Collie; Andrew Knight
- Cinematography: Martin McGrath
- Editors: Alexandre de Franceschi; Scott Gray
- Running time: 103min
- Production companies: Entertainment One; Essential Media and Entertainment

Original release
- Network: Adelaide Film Festival
- Release: October 2013
- Network: ABC
- Release: 2 February 2014

The Broken Shore is a 2013 television film adaptation of the novel of the same title by Australian writer Peter Temple.

== Plot ==
While recovering in a small coastal town from serious physical injuries he received while on duty, Detective Joe Cashin is called to investigate the death of a wealthy local man, Charles Burgoyne. As he digs further into the mystery, he uncovers secrets, betrayal and police corruption that impact everyone around him.

== Cast ==
- Don Hany as Detective Joe Cashin
- Damon Herriman as Jamie Burgouyne
- Claudia Karvan as Helen Castleman
- Erik Thomson as Steve Villani
- Anthony Hayes as Hopgood
- Dan Wyllie as Dave Rebb
- Robyn Nevin as Cecily Addison
- Tony Briggs as Paul Dove
- Wayne Blair as Bobby Walshe
- Noni Hazlehurst as Sybil Cashin
- Catherine McClements as Erica Burgouyne
- Mitchell Butel as Liam
- Rick Tonna as Ray Sarris
- Jackson Tozer as TV Journalist
- Xavier West as Young Joe Cashin
- Marnie Reece-Wilmore as Jadeen

== Production ==
The screenplay was written by Andrew Knight for production companies Easy Tiger Productions and Essential Media & Entertainment.

Filming took place around Port Campbell in Victoria Australia.

== Screening ==
The movie had its world premiere at the Adelaide Film Festival on 15 October 2013. It aired on the ABC on 2 February 2014.

== See also ==
- 2014 in Australian television
