= Four of a Kind (film) =

- Theatrical release poster
- Directed by: Fiona Cochrane
- Written by: Helen Collins
- Produced by: Fiona Cochrane; Leverne McDonnell
- Starring: Leverne McDonnell; Gail Watson; Nina Landis; Louise Siversen; Ben Steel; Peta Brady; Robert Rabiah
- Cinematography: Zbigniew Friedrich
- Edited by: Zbigniew Friedrich
- Music by: Joe Camilleri; The Black Sorrows
- Release date: 30 August 2008 (Montréal World Film Festival)
- Country: Australia
- Language: English

Four of a Kind is the debut feature film for director Fiona Cochrane. It was completed in 2008 and released in 2009.

== Cast ==
- Leverne McDonnell as Detective Inspector Gina Sturrock
- Gail Watson
- Nina Landis as Susan
- Louise Siversen as Anne
- Ben Steel as Michael Keeling
- Peta Brady as Young Gina
- Robert Rabiah as Paul

== Production ==
It is based on the stage play Disclosure by Helen Collins as presented at La Mama Theatre (Melbourne) during the 2006 Melbourne Fringe Festival. It was shot on location in Melbourne, Australia.

== Synopsis ==
Lies. Betrayal. Blackmail. Murder.

Four women, each with a secret they are coaxed, tricked or forced into revealing. Through a veil of lies all four deal with the truth as they experience betrayal, ambition, loneliness, pain and anger. The lies they tell themselves affect them.

== Reviews ==
" … beneath its deceptively simple surface lies an emotionally lacerating psychological whodunit of unusual complexity" – Paul Harris, Film Buffs Forecast

'Not far off being a hidden Australian gem that you should race out to'- Ben McEachen, Empire Magazine

'Tingling with adult tension!’ – John Flaus, The Melbourne Review

== Reception ==
Film reviews include:

- O'Connell, David. "Four of a Kind". 20/20 Filmsight. Archived from the original on 5 January 2010.
- Hawker, Philippa (11 June 2009). "Four means of subterfuge". The Age.
- Keller, Louise. "Four of a Kind". Urban Cinefile. Archived from the original on 30 September 2009.
- Boltin, Kylie (11 June 2009). "Playing the hand they're dealt". SBS.
