= The Big Hurt (film) =

1986 film directed by Barry Peak

- Directed by: Barry Peak
- Written by: Barry Peak; Sylvia Bradshaw
- Produced by: Chris Kiely
- Starring: David Bradshaw
- Release date: 1986
- Country: Australia
- Language: English
- Budget: AU $690,000

The Big Hurt is a 1986 low-budget thriller directed by Barry Peak starring David Bradshaw, Lian Lunson, Simon Chilvers, John Ewart, Alan Cassell.

== Synopsis ==
A reporter investigating the death of a research scientist discovers further deaths connected to the case - some of which have been deemed suicides. He discovers that the scientist may have been murdered to cover up a government plot concerning illegal drug testing. Together with the scientist's daughter, he attempts to clear her father's name.

== Production ==
The film was shot over six weeks with money raised via 10BA. It was filmed on Super 16mm but later blown up to 35mm.

== Cast ==
- David Bradshaw as Price
- Lian Lunson as Lisa
- Simon Chilvers as Algerson
- John Ewart as Harry Gregory
- Alan Cassell as Blake
- Tommy Dysart as Schwartz
- Nick Waters as McBride
- Syd Conabere as O'Neal
- Alethea McGrath as Mrs Trent
