= Healing (2014 film) =

- Theatrical film poster
- Directed by: Craig Monahan
- Written by: Craig Monahan; Alison Nisselle
- Produced by: Tait Brady; Craig Monahan
- Starring: Don Hany; Hugo Weaving; Robert Taylor; Xavier Samuel; Justine Clarke; Laura Brent; Anthony Hayes
- Cinematography: Andrew Lesnie; Perla Sancassani
- Edited by: Suresh Ayyar
- Music by: David Hirschfelder
- Production companies: Pointblank Pictures; Screen Australia
- Distributed by: Pinnacle Films
- Release date: 8 May 2014
- Running time: 119 minutes
- Country: Australia
- Language: English
- Box office: $428,524 USD (Australia)

Healing is a 2014 English-language Australian drama film produced by PointBlank Pictures and directed by Craig Monahan and co-written with Alison Nisselle. The film stars Don Hany, Hugo Weaving, Robert Taylor, Xavier Samuel, Justine Clarke, Laura Brent and Anthony Hayes.

It was released theatrically in Australia on 8 May 2014. It was subsequently screened at several film festivals around the world, including the Seattle International Film Festival on 25 May and the Cannes Film Festival in May 2015.

== Plot ==
Viktor Kahdem (Don Hany), is an Iranian-Australian criminal, and is being is transferred to the Won Wron Correctional Centre, a low-security prison farm situated in rural Victoria, to serve the final stretch of his prison sentence. Once there, he quickly attracts the attention of Matt Perry (Hugo Weaving), a correctional officer at the prison. One day not long after his arrival, Khadem and Perry are on a work detail together when they discover an injured wedge-tail eagle trapped in a wire fence. Perry notices Kahdem's almost immediate affection and care of the bird. Soon, Perry has set up a small aviary inside which the inmate can rehabilitate the bird, noting that as he aids the recovery of the bird he can also heal himself. Kahdem is the first prisoner to undergo this new program. Whilst training the wedge-tail eagle, which Perry has named Yasmine, inmate and officer develop a strong fraternal relationship and Kahdem opens up about his past to his new friend.

After hearing about his past and finding out that he has living family despite never having had a visit, Perry becomes motivated to assist Kahdem in his rehabilitation and intervenes to invite his son to the prison for a visit. Convinced against his initial refusal of the offer, Yousef (Dimitri Baveas) eventually takes up the invitation to attend the prison and pay a visit his incarcerated father. Unexpectedly, the visit turns sour after sensitive issues are touched upon. Kahdem is angered and keeps his fist clenched in frustration, whilst Yousef stands to shout at him. Eventually Yousef leaves in rage, hurting Kahdem and his morale.

Perry invites a local wildlife expert named Glynis (Jane Menelaus) to assist in Yasmine's training, and she warns Viktor that he must prepare Yasmine for her eventual release back into the wild. The bird, she reminds him, is only in the aviary for wildlife rehabilitation. Whilst this is all occurring, other inmates such as Paul (Xavier Samuel) begin rehabilitating other injured birds as part of the program pioneered by Perry. Paul's injured bird is a majestic white owl with whom he shows a great devotion.

The friendship developed between Kahdem and Perry, as well as the work Kahdem does with Yasmine, allows him to truly find inner happiness through the meaning brought to his life.

Yasmine appears fully rehabilitated and is released into the wild. However she is once again found injured and it is decided that she needs to be kept at Healesville Sanctuary.

Kahdem is subsequently released from prison and reconciled with his son and family. Together they visit Healesville where Kahdem is reunited with Yasmine.

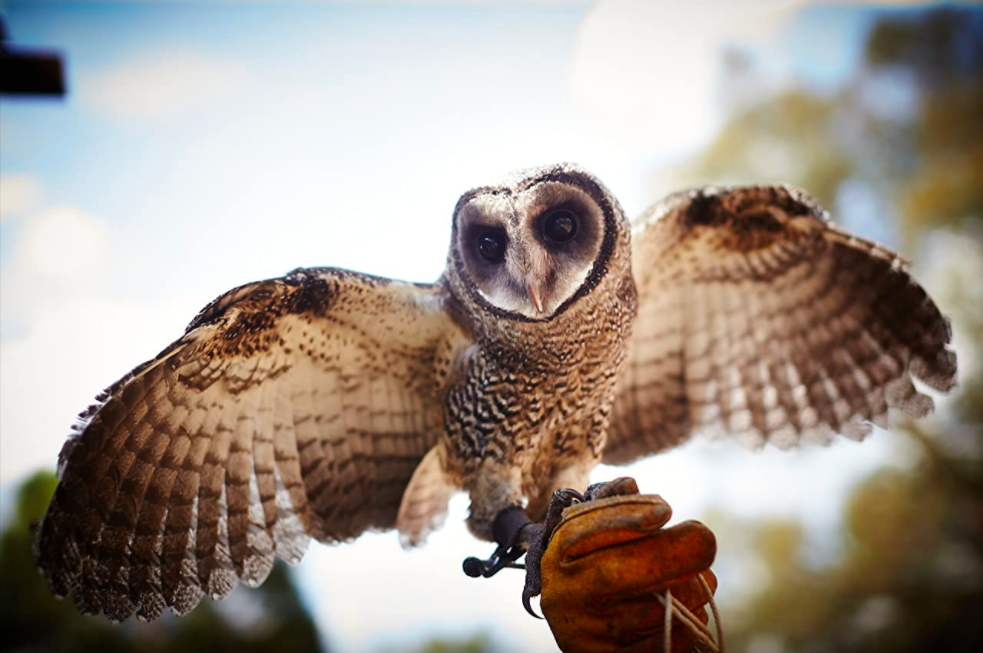

== Cast ==
- Don Hany as Viktor Khadem, an Iranian-Australian inmate at the Won Wron Correctional Centre (protagonist)
- Hugo Weaving as Matt Perry, an officer at the Won Wron Correctional Centre
- Robert Taylor as Vander
- Xavier Samuel as Paul, a young inmate at the Won Wron Correctional Centre
- Justine Clarke as Michelle
- Laura Brent as Stacey
- Anthony Hayes as Warren
- Tony Martin
- Dimitri Baveas as Yousef, the protagonist's estranged son
- Tony Briggs as Travis
- Mark Leonard Winter as Shane Harrison
- Leanne Campbell as Shane's alcoholic Mum
- Jane Menelaus as Glynis, a local wildlife professional
- Richard Stables as Ted
- Paul Bonet as Mr Anderson

== Production ==
=== Filming ===
Filming began on 18 February 2013 and took place in different parts of the Australian state of Victoria over a few months. The setting was produced in three locations; Healesville, Kyneton, and Melbourne. All film locations are Victorian in an attempt to replicate the landscapes of the true story (on which Healing is based), which also took place in a regional Victorian prison.

Healing is the second film to be produced by PointBlank Pictures.

== Release ==
The film was released on 8 May 2014 in Australia, on 24 July in New Zealand, and on 25 May in the US at a Seattle International Film Festival.

In 2015, it was selected to screen in two sections of the 2015 Cannes Film Festival, in both the Cinema des Antipodes selection of Cannes Cinéphiles (Official Selection) and Cannes Cinéphiles, Prix Cannes Ecrans Seniors (In Competition).

=== Box office ===
It opened at #12 in Australia, grossing $116,928 in its first week at the box office. It went on to gross a total of $428,524 (USD) in Australia.

=== Reception ===
The film received mostly positive critical feedback. On the review aggregator website Rotten Tomatoes, 75% of 12 critics' reviews are positive, with an average rating of 6.4/10.

Positive reviews included acknowledgements of the overall theme of the narrative and its plot. Sandra Hall of The Sydney Morning Herald wrote "The parallels between injured bird and flawed man work brilliantly in Healing." Matthew Thoomey from the ABC similarly adds,"It has something to say about the importance of therapy (whatever the form) and the power of forgiveness. There's much to reflect upon."

Evan Williams gave the film 4 out of 5 stars in his review for The Australian. Williams described it as "a film rich in ideas and vivid characters. Watching it is an exhilarating experience." Margaret Pomeranz reviewed the film for At the Movies for ABC. Pomeranz gave the film 4 out of 5 stars: "This is possibly the most sentimental prison movie I've ever seen. And I was so grateful. It's really lovely. The performances are fabulous."

Megan Lehmann of The Hollywood Reporter was also enthusiastic about the film: "Weaving is terrific as Matt Perry...But the film belongs to Don Hany, a veteran of Australian television starring in his first major film." Lehmann described the film as an "emotionally satisfying story of redemption." The film critic, Eddie Cockrell, wrote a positive review about the film for Variety, describing it as an "intelligent and satisfying drama". Cockrell continued: "It’s refreshing to see a film that takes its own sweet time building characters and the subtle conflicts simmering among them. Led by the familiar and bankable Weaving, the cast, under Monahan’s sure guidance, deftly underplays what could have been, in other hands, an awkward melodrama."

Luke Buckmaster, film critic for The Guardian Australia, gave the film 3 out of 5 stars. Buckmaster compared the film to The Usual Suspects and commended the "clutch of strong performances" among the cast. He also highlighted Weaving's performance: "Weaving delivers a note-perfect performance as the prison guard whose big heart leads him closer to the duties of a social worker. Weaving, surely one of Australian cinema’s best assets, lifts scripts to dramatic heights other actors are incapable of reaching, which can both bolster supporting performances and make them look pale by comparison." Buckmaster concluded "At its most simplistic, Healing feels like a glossy postcard drama, its pointy bits smoothed over by an unashamed sense of spirit and optimism. It is also a tender, thoughtful and inspiring film from an under-appreciated director."

== Accolades ==
Healing received nine nominations and three wins (all of which were by Craig Monohan) following its release in 2014. The following list outlines

- David Hirschfelder was nominated for Best Original Music Score at the 2015 Australian Academy of Cinema and Television Arts (AACTA) Awards in 2015
- Craig Monohan was nominated and won the 2015 Australian Directors' Guild Flinder's Series Award.
- Don Hany was nominated for the Best Actor in the 2015 Australian Film Critics Association Awards.
- Healing was nominated for the 2014 Australian Screen Sound Guild 2014 award for the Feature Film Soundtrack of the Year.
- The Film Critics Circle of Australia Awards 2015 nominated:
  - Don Hany for Best Actor,
  - David Hirschfelder for Best Music Score, and
  - Justine Clarke for Best Actress - Supporting Role.
- Craig Monohan was nominated and won the Audience Award at the 2014 Rencontres Internationales du Cinéma des Antipodes.
- Craig Monohan was nominated and won the Director's Choice Award for Best Foreign Film at the 2015 Sedona International Film Festival.

Healing was also awarded the 2014 Gadens Queensland Literary Award for Feature Film Script before the film's release.
