= Janus (TV series) =

- Created by: Tony McDonald; Alison Nisselle
- Starring: Simon Westaway; Chris Haywood; Jeremy Kewley
- Country of origin: Australia
- No. of seasons: 2
- No. of episodes: 26

Production
- Executive producer: Sue Masters
- Producer: Bill Hughes
- Running time: 50 minutes

Original release
- Network: ABC
- Release: 1 September 1994 – 19 April 1995

Related
- Phoenix

Janus (released internationally as Criminal Justice) is an Australian legal drama television series produced by the Australian Broadcasting Corporation, which it broadcast from 1994 to 1995. It was created by Alison Nisselle and Tony McDonald.

It is a spin-off of the 1992 crime drama Phoenix, which also starred Simon Westaway as Sergeant Peter Faithful. The 1994 series was loosely based on the true story of Melbourne's Pettingill crime family and the Walsh Street police shootings. It was followed by a second series, Janus II, in 1995.

While the series struggled in ratings, attributed to its realism and complex legal jargon, it was critically lauded, winning several Logie Awards, including Most Outstanding Drama Series in 1995, and several AFI Award nominations.

== Synopsis ==
Janus follows the bitterly fought prosecutions of a notorious criminal family, the Hennesseys, from the viewpoints of the family, the police and, in particular, the lawyers, prosecutors, barristers and judges, involved in all aspects of the story.

When the series begins, four members of the infamous Hennessey clan are acquitted of the shooting of two young policemen in a bungled bank heist. The city of Melbourne is shocked as brothers Mal and Steve, along with brother-in-law Darren Mack and friend Ken Hardy, walk free. The prosecutors, judges, magistrates and police – many modelled heavily on real-life legal figures – are determined to put the Hennessey members behind bars if they can. But corruption, legal loopholes, delays, and stretched resources combine to make the quest to jail the group far from straightforward.

== Cast ==
=== Main ===
- Chris Haywood as Defence Barrister Michael Kidd (25 episodes)
- Simon Westaway as Sergeant Peter "Noddy" Faithful (25 episodes)
- Jeremy Kewley as Crown Prosecutor Vic Manoulis (25 episodes)

=== Regular / recurring ===
- Tracy Mann as Tina Bertram (12 episodes)
- Louise Siversen as Magistrate Glenda de Bono (18 episodes)
- Felix Nobis as Rob Griffin (23 episodes)
- Jane Menelaus as Jenny Hanson (6 episodes)
- Paulene Terry-Beitz as Shirl Hennessey (21 episodes)
- Brett Swain as Mal Hennessey (16 episodes)
- Leon Teague as Steve Hennessey (13 episodes)
- Victoria Eagger as Rhonda Hennessey (8 episodes)
- Belinda McClory as Kirsty Nichols (13 episodes)
- Jack Finsterer as Bronowski (10 episodes)
- Nique Needles as Darren Mack (7 episodes)
- Maude Davey as Leslie Keilor (5 episodes)
- Steven Vidler as Danny Wyatt (4 episodes)
- John Atkinson as Nick (3 episodes)

=== Guests ===
- Alex Menglet as Dr Rogers (1 episode)
- Christine Stephen-Daly as Gilda (1 episode)
- Christopher Milne as Alan Tyrrell (1 episode)
- Greg Stone as Ed Mann (1 episode)
- Janet Andrewartha as Anna (1 episode)
- Kim Trengove as Jules (1 episode)
- Rob Carlton as Brett Hayes (1 episode)
- Sheryl Munks as Simone (1 episode)
- Tony Nikolakopoulos as Lou de Luca (1 episode)

In addition, David Bradshaw and Jennifer Jarman-Walker reprise their roles from Phoenix as Andrew 'Fluff' Saunders and Cath Darby respectively. Brett Swain and Belinda McClory previously appeared in Phoenix as other characters.

== Episodes ==
=== Series overview ===
Series	Episodes	Originally released	
Series	Episodes	First released	Last released
1	13	8 September 1994	17 November 1994
2	13	26 January 1995	20 April 1995

=== Janus (1994) ===
No. overall	No. in season	Title	Original release date
1	1	"Malice Aforethought– Part 1"	1 September 1994
Four men, all career criminals, are charged over the fatal shooting of a policeman and the serious wounding of another, during an armed hold up. When they walk free because of a legal technicality, the city reels in shock.
2	2	"Malice Aforethought– Part 2"	1 September 1994
3	3	"Not on the Merits"	8 September 1994
Steve Hennessey's girlfriend, Kirsty Nicholls, turns to the police for protection in return for giving evidence against Mal on a drug charge.
4	4	"A Rare Crushing Reversal"	15 September 1994
Mal and Steve Hennessey, along with their de facto brother-in-law Darren Mack, are once again up on drug charges. With the prosecution armed with video and audio evidence and the testimony of reformed heroin addict Dale Cassidy, everything appears to be in place to convict them – until defence barrister Michael Kidd goes to work, destroying Cassidy's credibility. Magistrate Glenda de Bono discharges Mal and once again, the Hennesseys celebrate another court victory. DPP instructing solicitor Tina Bertrum has the hopeless task of trying to convince a woman stabbed by her husband during a domestic dispute to testify against him.
5	5	"Judgement Amongst Short Men"	22 September 1994
Having attacked Kirsty outside of court months earlier, Rhonda Hennessey is now on trial herself facing a charge of attempting to pervert the course of justice for threatening Kirsty to keep her from testifying against Mal and Steve. Despite a last minute attempt by the defence to keep Kirsty from testifying due to her delicate condition (she is now six months pregnant with Steve's child), Kirsty takes to the witness stand for the prosecution but in recounting the incident, she is evasive and downplays Rhonda's threats. Despite Kirsty's efforts, Sen Det. Jan Murray's testimony is sufficient to see Rhonda found guilty. Shirl is outraged her family continues to be persecuted. While in the County Court, controversy erupts when Judge Wynn makes a sexist judgement while sentencing a man for raping a prostitute, suggesting in his instructions to the jury that the rape was less traumatic to her because of her profession. Due to the firestorm in the media, Judge Wynn decides to take some time off, to let things settle down.
6	6	"Reckless Indifference"	29 September 1994
A youth is charged with a long list of offences, including attempted murder, after a high-speed chase ends with him nearly running down a police officer. The young man refuses to give his name to investigators and is remanded into custody until such time as he reveals his name.
7	7	"Without Consent"	6 October 1994
Prosecutor Rob Griffin takes on the case of Jane and Caroline, two sisters who had been abused by their uncle several years before. This is not an easy case for Rob as he is facing a particularly ruthless defence lawyer. The trial is a terrible ordeal for the sisters but prospects look good when their uncle seems to confess to the crimes in his statement. However, a legal technicality relating to Jane's age at the time of the assault results in the charges being dropped. Determined not to let their uncle get off altogether, the sisters waive their right to anonymity and tell their story to the newspapers. Meanwhile, Steve Hennessey appeals for bail on a minor drug charge, and his lawyer Michael Kidd plays the system well. Kidd delays the hearing to a date when all the top prosecutors will be tied up and gets the case before a favourable magistrate. This leaves it up to Tina to keep Hennessey behind bars. Minutes before the hearing, Kidd produced a witness, William Ferguson, who provides an alibi for Steve. This gives Tina no time to assess if the witness is questionable. Since Steve was arrested for only a small amount of drugs, and with his pregnant girlfriend Kirsty in court, the magistrate is inclined towards leniency.
8	8	"Fail to Appear"	13 October 1994
The pressure is finally beginning to tell on Steve Hennessey. He has a fight with his girlfriend Kirsty the night before his bail hearing and goes out to drown his sorrows. He ends up crashing at a mate's house and misses his bail hearing. This is not a clever move as the robbery squad have linked him with a recent bank job. The police haul him back to jail and charge him with armed robbery. Vic's old uni friend Elias Khosaba turns up. Even though Vic thinks him cocky and questions his scruples, he ropes Khosaba into the team because he's a brilliant lawyer. Khosaba immediately proves his worth by helping Vic to get a press gag order in the Supreme Court, stopping Michael Kidd from moving for a mistrial by claiming the impossibility of a fair trial for Steve. Meanwhile, Tina fights an uphill battle to jail two men for a vicious assault on an elderly gentleman. The victim is a hopeless witness as his memory is shot from years of alcohol abuse, but Tina is determined to get a conviction and obtains convincing hospital reports and statements from other witnesses. The old man's attackers are convicted, and also on a good note, Andrew Saunders, the policeman on the case, takes quite a shine to her. Back in jail, Steve begins to lose the plot and accuses prison officers of trying to kill him by poisoning his food. When he can take it no longer, he escapes by overpowering a guard and taking his gun. This means deep trouble for Steve because if he gets caught, he's going down.
9	9	"A Mischievous Offence"	20 October 1994
Steve Hennessey is still on the run. However, Kenny, a small-time crook and criminal colleague of Steve's, is facing an attempted murder charge after a bank job went wrong.
10	10	"A Familiar Utterance"	27 October 1994
Vic Manoulis tries to remain impartial when justice-seeker Michael Kidd takes on the defence of two detectives charged with assaulting a bouncer, an event that leaves the cops with a lot of mixed emotions. Kidd is a crafty operator, but a man who makes a living defending cop-killers seems somewhat inapt for this case. The case is a particularly distressing experience for prosecutor Jenny Hansen, especially after a particularly shoddy performance from her star witness, whose story has more holes than a Swiss cheese; he can not account for an hour and a half, he misidentifies the drinks the detectives bought, and Kidd provokes him into outbursts that make him look bad. Across town, Rob Griffin continues his investigation into a ten-year-old murder case after a chance remark from Clyde implicates Mal Hennessey in the shooting of two policemen some years earlier. He manages to get the files on the original case, and unearths some damning evidence – a recording of Mal boasting about the buzz he got from his first killing and implicating himself in other murders. So, while the prosecutors see one case go down the drain, the bigger picture begins to look a lot more promising.
11	11	"Without Prejudice"	3 November 1994
The drug trial of Steve Hennessey and Darren Mack begins in the County Court with Michael Kidd and Vic Manoulis taking their places at the bar table. The prosecution's case isn+t helped by their star witness, Dale Cassidy, a former drug addict who knows that turning on the Hennessey's may cost him his life, being so scared of retribution from the Hennessey clan that he attempts suicide on the first morning of the trial. He does, however, finally make it to court and puts in a surprisingly good performance, despite being scowled at by Mal and made to sound unreliable by Michael Kidd. Peter Faithful makes good progress with Rob Griffin's investigation into the ten-year-old murder case. New pathology techniques give a greater chance of connecting Mal with the murder. And that's not the only reason Mal's in trouble. Kirsty confides to Steve that Mal has his eye on her and that is the final straw. Peter promises him a safe house, a new name and a life with Kirsty and their baby in return for evidence against Mal, and Steve starts to waver. With even his own family turning against him, it doesn't look like Mal will be able to keep this skeleton in the closet for much longer.
12	12	"Improper Influences"	10 November 1994
It seems that fate is conspiring to keep Steve Hennessey out of jail-even though the evidence against him is overwhelming. As Steve and Darren Mack's heroin-dealing trial enters its fourth week, a lengthy prison sentence looks likely, given their appalling past records, and Steve's recent jail escape hasn't exactly endeared him to the authorities. However, unbeknownst to the main protagonists, Judge Grossman is diagnosed with a life threatening illness, though he is determined to see the case through to its end. Even so, it isn't just him who is putting the trial at risk. Various members of the jury have been acting unprofessionally, taking sides on gut instinct and prejudice rather than the evidence-an attitude that the foreman is furious about. Steve's murderous brother Mal is still at large, and with Peter Faithful determined to nail Mal Hennessey for murder, the discovery of an ex-girlfriend of Mal's in prison could be just the breakthrough he needs.
13	13	"Burden of Proof"	17 November 1994
Peter Faithful's evidence against Steve Hennessey and Darren Mack proves to be extremely incriminating. However, it is up to Michael Kidd to discredit the experienced detective. He accuses Peter of conducting a vendetta against the Hennessey family, improper police practices, carrying out illegal searches on the Hennessey home, and planting drugs. Steve's girlfriend, Kirsty Nichols, gives evidence. It transpires that some months earlier she had been enticed by Peter to give evidence against the Hennesseys, but times have changed. Kirsty is now the mother of Steve's young baby and is back in the bosom of the family. She is terrified of saying the wrong thing. When the trial finally comes to an end, the Hennesseys have good cause to celebrate. However, their gloating is short-lived-for Mal Hennessey, the worst is yet to come.

=== Janus II (1995) ===
No. overall	No. in season	Title	Original release date
14	1	"A Lawful Apprehension"	26 January 1995
Charged with murder and facing a life in prison, Mal Hennessey is planning an escape, but he can't do it without the help of his younger brother, Steve. Mal hides a blade in the prison van and makes his escape on the way to court. Steve is waiting for him with a motorbike and the pair don't stick around.
15	2	"Suicide by Cop"	2 February 1995
Steve Hennessey is dead, and Peter Faithful and his Tactical Response Squad team find themselves in the spotlight with many questions to be answered. Danny Wyatt fired the fatal shot, and the pressure of the investigation is pushing him to breaking point. Peter Faithful turns to the police psychologist for help as the probe into the shooting continues – the police have their backs to the wall, and internal inquiries are pointing to a cover-up. An eyewitness claims to have seen Danny Wyatt and Peter Faithful put a gun next to Steve Hennessey's body, a claim the detectives vehemently deny. However, for Shirl Hennessey and Steve's de facto, Kirsty Nichols, the death causes enormous tension while the underworld seeks revenge. Meanwhile, Tina Bertrum prosecutes a vicious assault that takes Danny Wyatt into the magistrate's court where he comes face-to-face with Shirl Hennessey, the mother of the man he shot and killed.
16	3	"Intent to Permanently Deprive"	9 February 1995
Life is rough for Shirl Hennessey. Her son, Steve, is dead, shot by police. Her other son, Mal, is facing a possible life sentence for murder. She is left at home with her daughter, Rhonda, daughter-in-law Kirsty, and their noisy children. However, when she is arrested for shoplifting and possession of a lighter-pistol, Shirl sees a chance to get the break she needs – a short stint in jail away from life's pressures. Michael Kidd wants to fight the charges tooth-and-nail to keep Shirl out of prison, and Magistrate Glenda de Bono doesn't want to put a woman her age behind bars, but Shirl is determined and a leading barrister and a top magistrate are no match for an old crook like Shirl. Meanwhile, Vic Manoulis has to keep his emotions in check when he prosecutes a child abuse case in which a young boy was killed by his stepfather.
17	4	"Right to Remain Silent"	16 February 1995
A minor drug case in the County Court puts the murder charge against Mal Hennessey in jeopardy when an inexperienced barrister paints a picture of the late Steve Hennessey as a "Mr. Big" of the drug trade. Roz Breen is charged with smuggling drugs into prison. She could get a community-based order if she pleads guilty, but instead she decides to fight the charge, trying to trade out of trouble on the Hennessey name. On the witness stand, Roz testifies that she was forced to take the drugs into prison out of fear of Steve Hennessey, who was sharing a cell with her brother at the time. Vic Manoulis and Peter Faithful know that any attempt to discredit Steve Hennessey would leave the way open for Mal to blame his dead brother for the ten-year-old murder of Pat Clancy. Meanwhile, the internal investigation into the shooting of Steve Hennessey continues with the police still under a cloud.
18	5	"My Learned Friend, Mr. Hennessey"	23 February 1995
After his escape, Mal was charged with the serious offense of Breach of Prison and his day in court has finally arrived. Everybody expects Michael Kidd to represent him, but the Hennessey's seemingly bottomless money pit is empty. Mal has been in custody for months, Shirl is in jail, and Steve is dead. Legal Aid won't take the case unless Mal pleads guilty and Kidd won't appear unless he is paid, so Mal dons his spectacles, a suit, and defends himself after first practising his courtroom skills on his fellow prisoners. Mal Hennessey has spent enough time in court over the years to know how to use the system. He issues a list of witnesses including Peter Faithful and the prison Governor. Nobody can stop Mal without infringing his rights, and the Magistrate is ensuring that doesn't happen. In a surprising turn, Magistrate Shearer orders Vic Manoulis to offer Hennessey legal assistance, stretching the prosecutor's patience to the limit.
19	6	"Confess and Avoid"	2 March 1995
Michael Kidd's financial gravy train, the Hennessey family and their ongoing court battles, has stopped until Mal appears in court charged with murder. Kidd is forced to look at other cases to maintain his lifestyle of expensive cars and fast bikes. He takes on the defence of a young law student charged with culpable driving after a car accident left one girl dead and another one seriously injured. Prosecutor Jenny Hanson is daunted by the prospect of appearing against the legendary Michael Kidd. Ian Bisley is more concerned about his future as a solicitor than the death of the young girl, and will not admit to himself that he is responsible. He flatters Kidd, clouding the barrister's normally astute legal mind. Kidd's defence is uninspiring, and Bisley is convicted and sentenced to two years in jail.
20	7	"A Prima Facie Case"	9 March 1995
Peter Faithful and his Tactical Response Squad face the glare of media and public limelight and their reputations are on the line as the inquest into the shooting of Steve Hennessey begins at the Coroner's Court and Michael Kidd is all out to attract the media's attention – Detectives Wyatt and Benson refuse to testify for fear of self incrimination leaving Peter Faithful to testify in his team's defense and face Kidd's accusation that police planted a gun at the scene of the shooting. The coroner comes back with an open finding on Steve Hennessey's death and refers the case to DPP for consideration. Meanwhile, Glenda De Bono, acting as coroner, observes Fluff's investigation of a suspicious death.
21	8	"Demands with Menaces"	16 March 1995
Rhonda Hennessey's de facto husband, Darren Mack, attempts to run an extortion racket inside prison, but his first victim does not frighten easily and turns Darren in. The situation is exacerbated when Michael Kidd sees this as an opportunity to further discredit Peter Faithfull and his team.
22	9	"Fit to Plead"	23 March 1995
Darren Mack is on trial for extortion. Michael Kidd is doing his best to prevent Darren's sentence from being increased, only to be sacked by the Hennessey in-law. However, unlike Mal, Darren's attempts to represent himself begins to verge on the ludicrous.
23	10	"Breach of Bond"	30 March 1995
Shane, the youngest of the Hennessey brothers, ends up before magistrate Glenda de Bono for a second time when he is arrested and charged over a burglary and a vicious assault. It's been almost a year since de Bono put Shane on a good behaviour bond after he stole a car and became involved in a high-speed police chase. Shirl desperately wants to keep her youngest son out of jail, hoping he won't end up like his brother, Mal, who is facing a life sentence for murder. However, Shirl is unaware of Shane's deep-seated fear of his brother and the family's dark secret. On his way into court, Shane's girlfriend slips him some drugs, forcing the case for be adjourned to allow Shane to come down from his drug-induced high. During the break, Glenda de Bono hears a case against a family of Romanies involving crystal ball readings, curses, and large payments of cash. Finally, Tina Bertrum proves her versatility when she prosecutes both the Romanies and Shane Hennessey.
24	11	"An Unnatural Act"	6 April 1995
Michael Kidd accepts a brief to defend a man charged with incest. It is a grubby case that disgusts Kidd, especially when the offender gets Legal Aid funding. Despite the vile nature of his client's offense, Kidd takes on his defence in his usual manor and manages to get his client to plead guilty. A recaptured prison escapee puts the final piece in the jigsaw that is the murder case against Mal Hennessey. Gary Herbert's van was used to dump the body after Mal's temper erupted and he shot Pat Clancy in his living room. His fear of Mal Hennessey prompts Gary to help the police. In legal circles, rumours abound with Michael Kidd telling anyone who will listen that the new County Court judge appointment will be the youngest ever. Magistrate Glenda de Bono hears the rumours and believes, like Vic, that he is up for a judgeship but both are in for a surprise.
25	12	"Mute by Visitation"	13 April 1995
Judge Glenda de Bono presides over a rape case in which the victim, the accused, and all the witnesses are deaf. The investigation into the shooting death of Pat Clancy gains momentum with Shirl charged with being an accessory after the fact. Meanwhile, Peter Faithfull and his Tactical Response Squad have no idea that they themselves are the subject of an ongoing investigation.
26	13	"Elements of Murder"	20 April 1995
Michael Kidd finds himself looking at the most unwinnable case he's ever contemplated. Mal Hennessey is charged with murder, with Shirl Hennessey being an accessory after the fact. Kidd believes that Mal has no chance of walking away a free man, and the only way he can save Shirl from a lengthy jail sentence is for Mal to plead guilty. However, trying to convince Mal of this will be one of the biggest challenges of Michael Kidd's illustrious career. Peter Faithful is disgusted to learn Vic Manoulis is prepared to strike a deal with Michael Kidd. However, Vic is privy to information that makes him realise that there might only be one chance to put Mal Hennessy behind bars – and it won't be through a trial. Peter Faithful and the rest of the Tactical Response Squad are suspended from duty and charged in connection with the shooting death of Steve Hennessey.

== Home release ==
The series was released in 2009 by the ABC on DVD in two volumes, each containing 13 episodes across 4 discs. However, it has since gone out of print.

== Related shows ==
Members of the Pettingill crime family were later depicted in the 2008 first series of Underbelly and in the 2011 miniseries Killing Time. They also inspired the characters in the 2010 Australian film Animal Kingdom and the 2016 American adaptation of the same name.
