= Dead Point =

2000 novel by Peter Temple

- First edition
- Author: Peter Temple
- Language: English
- Series: Jack Irish series
- Genre: crime novel
- Publisher: Bantam, Australia
- Publication date: 2000
- Publication place: Australia
- Media type: Print (paperback)
- Pages: 275 pp
- ISBN: 1-86325-222-3
- OCLC: 48835300

Dead Point (2000) is a Ned Kelly Award-winning novel by Australian author Peter Temple. This is the third novel in the author's Jack Irish series.

== Dedication ==
"For Gerhard and Karin, dear friends, for all the good times: Kom dans, Klaradyn."

== Awards ==
- Ned Kelly Awards for Crime Writing, Best Novel, 2001: joint winner

== Notes ==
This novel has also been published in the UK (in 2008 by Quercus as part of Bad Debts: A Jack Irish Omnibus) and in the Netherlands, in a Dutch-language edition (in 2001 by De Boekerij) with a translation by Paul Witte.

== Reviews ==
- "Australian Crime Fiction Database"
- "epinions"
- "Petrona"
- "Tangled Web"
