= Phoenix (Australian TV series) =

Australian police drama television series

- Created by: Tony McDonald; Alison Nisselle
- Starring: Paul Sonkkila; Sean Scully; Andy Anderson; Peter Cummins; Simon Westaway; Nell Feeney; Susie Edmonds; Tony Poli; Stuart McCreery; David Bradshaw; Jennifer Jarman-Walker; Vikki Blanche
- Country of origin: Australia
- No. of seasons: 2
- No. of episodes: 26

Production
- Executive producer: Jill Robb
- Producer: Bill Hughes
- Running time: 50 mins

Original release
- Network: ABC
- Release: 13 February 1992 – 3 June 1993

Related
- Janus

Phoenix is a Logie Award-winning Australian crime drama television series broadcast by the Australian Broadcasting Corporation from 1992 to 1993. It was created by Alison Nisselle and Tony McDonald.

The first series recounts the investigation of the bombing of a Victorian police social function, loosely based on the real life Russell Street Bombing in 1986. It was followed by a second series, Phoenix II, based on a series of violent aggravated burglaries ("ag burgs") against wealthy senior citizens.

The series was filmed in Melbourne, Victoria and was characterised by its dark, noir-ish visual tone and non-linear editing, reminiscent of the ABC crime dramas Scales of Justice, Blue Murder and Wildside, which all also dealt with corruption in the police force.

The show was lauded for its realistic depiction of police investigation techniques, aided by extensive research by the show's writers. It won several Logie Awards, including Most Outstanding Miniseries Logie in 1993 and 1994, as well as several Australian Film Institute Awards, and the Television or Film Theme of the Year Award at the APRA Music Awards of 1993.

The series spawned the 1994 spin-off Janus, with Simon Westaway reprising his role as Sergeant Peter Faithful.

== Cast ==
=== Phoenix (1992) ===
==== Starring ====
- Paul Sonkkila as Jock Brennan (13 episodes)
- Sean Scully as Ian "Goose" Cochrane (13 episodes)
- Andy Anderson as Lochie Renford (13 episodes)
- Peter Cummins as Superintendent Wallace (13 episodes)
- Simon Westaway as Sergeant Peter "Noddy" Faithful (13 episodes)
- Nell Feeney as Megan Edwards (11 episodes)
- Susie Edmonds as Carol Cochrane (12 episodes)
- Tony Poli as Lazarus "Laz" Carides (10 episodes)

==== Also starring ====
- Kevin Summers as Colin Toohey (8 episodes)
- Dominic Sweeney as Wheels (9 episodes)
- David Bradshaw as Senior Detective Andrew 'Fluff' Saunders (5 episodes)
- George Vidalis as Mick (12 episodes)
- Todd Telford as Dennis (5 episodes)
- Patrick Ward as Blazo (4 episodes)
- Nicholas Politis as Nick (9 episodes)
- Esben Storm as Pat (2 episodes)
- Brett Swain as Tattoo (1 episode)
- Shane Connor as Manny (1 episode)
- Tiriel Mora as Gasper (1 episode)
- John Brumpton as Gonzo (1 episode)

=== Phoenix II (1993) ===
==== Starring ====
- Simon Westaway as Sergeant Peter 'Noddy' Faithful (13 episodes)
- Stuart McCreery as Senior Sergeant Adrian Moon (13 episodes)
- David Bradshaw as Senior Detective Andrew 'Fluff' Saunders (13 episodes)
- Jennifer Jarman-Walker as Senior Detective Cath Darby (13 episodes)
- Peter Cummins as Superintendent Wallace (13 episodes)
- Vikki Blanche as Chris Faithful (9 episodes)
- Susie Edmonds as Carol Cochrane (9 episodes)
- Sean Scully as Ian 'Goose' Cochrane (13 episodes)

==== Also starring ====
- Peter McCauley as Inspector Lew Murdoch (12 episodes)
- David Roberts as Detective Robert Howie (10 episodes)
- Keith Agius as Docket (13 episodes)
- Bob Halsall as Boomer (13 episodes)
- Russell Fletcher as Kermie (6 episodes)
- Greg Scealey as Fish (7 episodes)
- Paul Sonkkila as Jock Brennan (3 episodes)
- Aaron Blabey (1 episode)
- Alan Hopgood as Bill Douglas
- Alex Menglet as Ivan Kastelanic (1 episode)
- Fiona Corke as Dog 1
- Greg Stone as Detective Inspector Miller (1 episode)
- Jacek Koman as Steward (1 episode)
- Mark Hembrow as Damian Thorpe
- Michael Beckley as Youth (1 episode)
- Nadine Garner as Lindy (1 episode)
- Nick Carrafa as Serio Diego (3 episodes)
- Peta Brady as Mandy (1 episode)
- Radha Mitchell as Joanna (1 episode)
- Richard Moir as Tony Hansen (1 episode)

== Episodes ==
Season	Episodes	Originally released	
Season	Episodes	First released	Last released
1	13	February 13, 1992	April 30, 1992
2	13	March 14, 1993	June 3, 1993

=== Phoenix (1992) ===
No. overall	No. in season	Title	Original release date
1	1	"Top Quality Crims"	February 13, 1992
Jock Brennan is Inspector of the Major Crime Squad and an old-style hard cop with not much time for new forensics. Ian Cochrane is a forensic scientist, working hard to have his methods accepted. Events conspire to end their antagonism.
2	2	"Christmas in July"	February 13, 1992
In the chaotic remains after the Police Club bombing, over the grim task of sorting through the pieces, Ian and Jock are forced to work together. With the death toll mounting, the only leads come from within the police force itself. One is the shell shocked young constable who is Jock's only eye witness. The other is a disgruntled policeman who may well have set off the bomb. The police find themselves doing what they dread most, investigating one of their own.
3	3	"A Bunch of Big Girls"	February 20, 1992
Megan is the first woman to join the all male world of Major Crime. Shut out by their sexism, it is not until she starts making headway with the flood of information that she gains some grudging acceptance.
4	4	"On the Edge"	February 27, 1992
Inspector Brennan recruits Snr Det Lazarus Carides to the task force. Laz has been undercover with the Bureau of Criminal Investigation (BCI) for over two years, predominantly investigating stolen car rackets. He has some difficulty fitting in to the close team environment of the task force. He inspects the wreckage of the bomb car, noticing that the chassis number has been drilled out, an unusual technique of disguising a vehicle's identity. Believing he is of more value to the investigation as an undercover, he returns to the street in an attempt to locate the garage which handled the bomb car. His "disappearance" creates derision within Major Crime-Laz is seen as untrustworthy, particularly by Sgt Peter Faithful. Meanwhile, Forensic believe the bomb was constructed from household items and are building a bomb replica.
5	5	"A Dog's Life"	March 5, 1992
Laz is still trying to earn the trust and respect of his new colleagues in Major Crime, but nevertheless, the immediate focus of the investigation is now on the Balcescu Brothers garage, which Laz believes handled the bomb car. It is "the kind of thing they specialise in and they're very bloody jumpy". The Major Crime squad is running over the Drug Squad, who has the garage under surveillance for drug offences. However, the Drug Squad submits to the Major Crime squad investigation; "it all comes down to two poor bloody dead coppers, doesn't it?" Application for Special Operation Group assistance on a raid of the Balcescu garage is knocked back by the Deputy Commissioner, leaving the Majors with no choice but to conduct the raid themselves. Brennan insists Laz be first through the door, ending his undercover days for good. While the raid is successful in execution, Forensic finds no direct link to the manufacture of the bomb. Several arrests are made, including Nick Panopolous and Lenny, but only Gaspar Balcescu is charged, for firearm and immigration offences.
6	6	"Out in the Cold"	March 12, 1992
The last vestiges of Laz's undercover persona are blown when Jock orders him to start acting like a detective. He can no longer work the streets without risking his life from the criminals he once lived amongst. It is a terrible loss of identity which leads to a violent outburst. Defending his Senior Sergeant, he assaults a member of the public. This brings him under the cold hard scrutiny of the Internal Investigations. Before it is over, Laz could be charged with a criminal offence.
7	7	"Old Rules, New Game"	March 19, 1992
With the bombing investigation stalled for lack of hard evidence, Jock seeks out an old trusted informant. Tiny, a professional safebreaker, is Jock's direct link to criminals who handle explosives. But Tiny, needing cash, double crosses Jock and decides to blow a safe. Things go wrong when the car he steals to transport his gear has a sleeping baby in the back seat. Jock gets a frantic call for help from the panicked Tiny. His much needed informant is about to go to jail for a long time.
8	8	"Fond Memories"	March 26, 1992
Witnessing two fleeing bank robbers reinforces Megan's belief that money will be the answer in solving the Police Club bombing as those responsible would've needed lots of it to carry out the job. Megan turns her attention to looking into various armed robberies which leads her to the rape squad. Jock is concerned she's wasting time follow unrelated leads but allows her to press on. Megan questions a woman about her violent assault believing her attackers are connected to the bombing. The woman is able to provide a description from which a composite image of one of her attackers in created. This new suspect quickly becomes the key focus of the investigation, despite Jock's superior's dismissal of the new information's importance. Meanwhile, detonators recovered during a police raid are confirmed to be of the same batch as that used in the bombing. The Major Crime squad sets up a sting to go after the intended buyer who turns out to be a legitimate quarry owner buying stolen detonators.
9	9	"Shaking the Tree"	April 2, 1992
Pursuing another line in the bombing investigation, the team raid known drug dealers with the hope of shaking out much needed information. One raid goes wrong when Lochie, the Senior Sergeant, is nearly shot by a terrified dealer. During questioning, it is discovered the frightened man was robbed - and his young sister assaulted - by some very dangerous men. It all points to the bombers but the dealer will not talk - no matter what. He's scared to death of the men. It is a frustrating dead end for the team.
10	10	"Blessed are the Peace Makers"	April 9, 1992
Knowing that they are facing very heavy villains, Jock allows a member of the crack Special Operations Group to be assigned to the bombing investigation team. Although Blazo is the epitome of a black suited 'headkicker', it soon becomes clear that Blazo is not a thug but a thinking policeman. The small boy in Ian falls 'helplessly in love' with the Special Operations cowboys. Bags of high explosives are recovered from a river - a sure indication that bombers maybe getting ready to do a runner - getting rid of the evidence. Time may be running out for the investigation if the bombers decide to head out of the state.
11	11	"Hair of the Dog"	April 16, 1992
With the forensic evidence largely tagged and ready, Carol becomes increasingly cut off from Ian and the lab. Now that she has returned to work - abandoning her maternity leave - her entry into the team rearranges alliances at a critical moment. Other crimes are drawing much needed resources from the investigation. Jock takes too long to discover his team is close to disintegrating.
12	12	"Paradise Tomorrow"	April 23, 1992
Running low on cash, Nick is eager to do another job but Pat is guarded, wanting to keep a low profile with the police investigation still ongoing. His hopes are threatened when Dennis befriends their 13-year-old neighbour bringing her mother into the equation with her concerns. The Major Crime Squad is having trouble linking their suspects to the bombing but Forensics continues to make progress identifying components from the bomb car. When a key piece of information is leaked to the press, the case is put in jeaopardy as the bombers begin to dispose of potential evidence but their mistakes begin to mount giving detectives crucial information allowing them to begin to put the final pieces of the puzzle together.
13	13	"Hard Ball"	April 30, 1992
The suspect's house is under heavy surveillance as the Major Crime Squad makes its final preparations before moving in. The decision is made for Megan to approach the neighbour to get a closer observation point but Jock refuses to let her be told exactly what the police's interest is, despite Megan's insistence the danger merits telling her what's she and her daughter are getting involved in. With admissions caught on tape, the police raid the house, taking the suspects into custody. Goose and the forensic team move quickly to secrure the ample physical evidence allowing the detectives to confront the bombers with the overwhelming evidence resulting in quick confessions. With the job done, the Deputy Commissioner arrives to offer his congratulations but pulls Jock aside to tell him he'll be under investigation by IID.

=== Phoenix II (1993) ===
No. overall	No. in season	Title	Original release date
14	1	"Victims Forever"	March 4, 1993
The resources of the Major Crime Squad are taken off an investigation into guns runners and focussed on the investigation of a series of aggravated burglaries. The latest home invasion has targeted the home of elderly couple Betty and James Arthur. Sergeant Peter Faithful heads up the investigation but finds himself fighting the squad's new boss, Senior Sergent Adrian Moon, to the point where he goes over Moon's head to Superintendent Wallace, with no success, to question Moon's ability to manage the unit. Unbeknownst to Peter, Moon has been working on instructions from higher up and is simply "doing the job he was told to do" in bringing the MCS into line.
15	2	"Deal or Pay"	March 11, 1993
The paths of the Major Crime Squad and the Dealers Squad meet when the Dealers come across a stolen watch linked to the aggravated burglaries. Resources stretched to the limit, the Majors also take over the interrogation of Joanna, a young offender pinched by the Dealers. In Forensic, Ian and Carol begin the difficult task of identifying unusual dirt samples found at the scene of the last aggravated burglary. Inspector Lew Murdoch, an ex toe-cutter, arrives to head up the Majors and appears to be a nine to five man with an 'attitude' problem. Squad morale goes into decline. A raid planned behind Murdoch's back turns into a fiasco. Complaints roll in and the Inspector's wrath descends on the squad and particularly on Snr. Sgt. Moon.
16	3	"Married to the Job"	March 18, 1993
The Major Crime Squad's investigation into the aggravated burglaries has stalled. Forensics is a long way from providing any definitive answers and Inspector Murdoch wants to pull Peter Faithful off the case in order to bring in a fresh perspective. Peter's wife Chris, a member of the drug squad, goes undercover to make a deal and finds her cover in jeopardy with a gun put to her head. Carol Cochrane is pulled out of the lab to examine a drug lab under surveillance. Adrain Moon's patience is tested when he is tasked with entertaining an interstate cop down in town for an extradition.
17	4	"The Return"	March 25, 1993
The Major Crime Squad is stunned by a second aggravated burglary at the Arthur's home which results in Arthur being beaten and his wife sexually assaulted. The investigation is re-energised with the police struggling to determine if this newest robbery is related to the previous string of crimes or, as it quickly begins to appear, a crime of opportunity committed by someone within the family looking for six valuable stamps missed the first time. The Major Crime Squad's manpower shortage is addressed by Inspector Murdoch who brings in Russell Howie from the Fraud Squad.
18	5	"Inside Information"	April 8, 1993
A tip from one of Murdoch's informants leads the Major Crime Squad to launch a raid on a warehouse hoping to find stolen property from the aggravated burglaries. The raid doesn't go as planned and Russell becomes the subject of a sexual assault charge by one of the young women arrested at the warehouse. Peter Faithful adds another black eye for the Majors when an allegation of corruption is made against him after he is unknowingly recorded by BCI [Bureau of Criminal Intelligence] making a deal with a known criminal for information on the robbers. The Assistant Commissioner wants to make it an Internal Security matter and keep it out of the more public IID. Aggravated burglary victim James Arthur is found dead in his home. Initial concern of a third visit from the robbers is quickly put to rest by Goose whose examination of the scene reveals a determined if poorly executed suicide, a death that sits heavy with Peter.
19	6	"Safe as Houses"	April 15, 1993
The Major Crime Squad and the Bureau of Criminal Intelligence lock horns over Carlos, an informant. While Forensic endeavour to narrow down possible sites of the lead contaminated soil, the Majors sift through endless threads of information. The Drug Squad lose track of Chris while she is undercover with a drug dealer and the top brass take Murdoch to task about the number of complaints against the Majors. Chris eventually turns up in an unexpected place - outside a 'safe house' that is raided by the Majors. Suddenly there is a cross-over between the Drug Squad and the Majors. Caught in the net is a brand new player John Rhys.
20	7	"Aladdin's Cave"	April 22, 1993
The Major Crime Squad take drug dealer Michael Dyson and local businessman John Rhys into custody and begin processing the contents of the safe house. They are searching for a link to the aggravated burglaries while the Drug Squad joins in looking for links to the amphetamine trade. Both men are slow in talking but as the evidence begins to build, Michael confesses he received the stolen goods found in the house from Rhys. Rhys is slow to cooperate but when the police raid his home, he reluctantly talks to protect his wife. He explains the extent of his involvement was to pick up the stolen goods but he won't give up any names for fear of his safety and for that of his wife revealing that the burglaries are just the tip of the iceberg, with it all tied to drug importation.
21	8	"In on the Joke"	April 29, 1993
A fingerprint found on a home-made gold bar recovered from the safe house leads the Major Crime Squad to known criminal Stan Cutler. Agreeing to talk only if he is put into police protection, Cutler provides the name of the man who melted down the stolen jewelry. Cutler escapes protective custody sending Moon and Fluff to NSW where he has been arrested on an outstanding warrant. Police raid the panel shop where Cutler says the gold was melted down and forensics find evidence of the job. Peter Faithful is investigated by ICS about a suspicious $20,000 that passed through his bank account. "The Shadow", a radio personality reporting police gossip, reports that a secret police report reveals that the Major Crime Squad is on thin ice.
22	9	"Give a Dog a Bone"	May 6, 1993
Pressure is on the Majors as they are forced to run their own surveillance on Flannagan, a prime suspect. Clever detection finally reveals a new thread linking Flannagan to a shipping container coming into the country. Peter Faithful confirms the importation of drugs via Nipper his informant on the docks. Unfortunately there are now new players on the scene; the Australian Federal Police.
23	10	"Shuffling the Deck"	May 13, 1993
Frustration mounts for the Majors as another aggravated burglary on an elderly couple takes place. But this time it is solo with no similarity to the previous offences. Chris Faithful, Drug Squad undercover, makes a cocaine buy from her new contact Sergio who confirms a big importation is arriving soon. Ian Cochrane in Forensic identifies hair and blood samples from the solo aggravated burglary as coming from the same crim involved in the previous attacks - the Majors finally have a strong lead to run with. The recent victims provide a facefit of the solo burglar as Sergeant Spivak from the Federal Police moves into the Major Crime Squad. A Joint Task Force is set up between the Majors and the Feds.
24	11	"Under Siege"	May 20, 1993
The Majors' raid on the flat of a prime suspect for the aggravated burglaries goes terribly wrong when a terrified woman jumps from a second-story window resulting in serious injuries and their suspect slips through their fingers. The new Chief Superintendent of Crime, Jock Brennan, arrives with the Internal Investigations Department to look into the bungled raid, which has once again put the squad's actions under scrutiny. The Major Crime Squad desperately searches for their missing suspect as IID launches an investigation of the squads' action during the raid, with particular attention on Peter Faithful. Forensic evidence found at the flat after the raid yields evidence linking the suspect to the aggravated burglaries. Peter Faithful is taken hostage by their suspect.
25	12	"Snow Job"	May 27, 1993
Life for the Major Crime Squad is now severely complicated by the scrutiny of Internal Investigations and a Joint Task Force with the Federal Police into drug importation. The pressure is almost intolerable. Chris Faithful's quick thinking saves her 'cover' when her drug contact Sergio sees her in a bar with Peter and Moon. Despite all their high-tech surveillance methods the Federal Police really blow the Joint Task Force out of the water when they use a helicopter to put a man on board the drug ship. The crooks are tipped off and the drugs disappear. Peter is devastated when his informant Nipper is found dead on the docks. The Joint Task Force is called off and the Majors are left to pick up the threads.
26	13	"Hit, Shit and Scatter"	June 3, 1993
The recovery of the body of the second aggravated burglar is good enough for the Assistant Commissioner who is content to shut down the investigation to satisfy the media who are fuelling the demand for a public inquiry into the conduct of the Major Crime Squad. Wallace defends the squad but it is already too late, once the investigation is over, the squad will be shut down. With the departure of the Federal Police, the forces of the Major Crime Squad and Drug Squads rally to push the drugs out of the docks and into circulation. The Majors make their move, seize the drugs and arrest the known men involved but the money eludes their grasp as Martin Schultz's unidentified partner slips away with the cash. The job done, Chief Superintendent Brennan announces the disbanding of the squad, effective immediately.

== Awards and nominations ==
Logie Awards

- 1993: Most Outstanding Series (won)
- 1994: Most Outstanding Achievement in Drama Production (won)

== Home release ==
The series was released in 2009 by the ABC on DVD in two volumes, each containing 13 episodes across 4 discs. However, it has since gone out of print.

== See also ==
- List of Australian television series
