= Jack Irish =

Australian television series

- DVD cover for the first two telemovies
- Genre: Crime drama
- Created by: Andrew Anastasios; Matt Cameron; Andrew Knight
- Based on: Jack Irish by Peter Temple
- Screenplay by: Matt Cameron; Andrew Knight
- Directed by: Jeffrey Walker; Kieran Darcy-Smith; Mark Joffe; Daniel Nettheim
- Starring: Guy Pearce; Marta Dusseldorp; Aaron Pedersen; Roy Billing; Shane Jacobson; Damien Richardson
- Theme music composer: David McCormack; Antony Partos
- Country of origin: Australia
- Original language: English
- No. of series: 3
- No. of episodes: 16 (+3 telemovies) (list of episodes)

Production
- Executive producer: Andrew Knight
- Producers: Ian Collie; Andrew Anastasios
- Cinematography: Martin McGrath
- Editor: Geoff Lamb
- Running time: 100 minutes (Movies); 50 minutes (TV series)
- Production company: Easy Tiger Productions

Original release
- Network: ABC TV
- Release: 14 October 2012 – 4 July 2021

Jack Irish is an Australian television drama series first broadcast on ABC TV on 14 October 2012. The series stars Guy Pearce as the title character, a former criminal lawyer turned investigator and debt collector. Much of the action is set in the Melbourne suburb of Fitzroy. Adapted from the crime fiction novels by author Peter Temple, the telemovies and series Jack Irish were developed by Andrew Anastasios, Matt Cameron and Andrew Knight. They began as three feature-length movies, before being adapted into three series, the final one airing from June 2021.

All three movies were directed by Jeffrey Walker, while Kieran Darcy-Smith serves as lead director on the series. Bad Debts, the first of the three feature-length movies, was watched by an average of 950,000 Australian viewers, ranking as the sixth most watched programme of the week. Black Tide, the second movie, was watched by an average of 851,000 Australian viewers, ranking as the thirteenth most watched programme of the week. Dead Point, the third and final movie, was watched by an average of 780,000 Australian viewers, ranking as the eleventh most watched programme of the week.

The first series, Jack Irish: Blind Faith, of six episodes was broadcast from 11 February to 17 March 2016. The second series, Jack Irish: Last Rites of six episodes was broadcast from 8 July to 12 August 2018. The second series was dedicated to the memory of Peter Temple, who had died in March 2018. The third and final series of four episodes, Jack Irish: Hell Bent, premiered on ABC TV and ABC iview on 13 June 2021.

== Cast ==
=== Main ===
- Guy Pearce as Jack Irish, a criminal defence lawyer turned debt collector and troubleshooter. Jack is still troubled over the murder of his wife by a deranged ex-client. He also works as an apprentice cabinet maker.
- Marta Dusseldorp as Linda Hillier, a determined reporter. She starts an on-off romantic relationship with Jack, becoming embroiled in many of Jack's investigations.
- Aaron Pedersen as Cam Delray, Harry Strang's right-hand man and one of Jack's closest friends.
- Roy Billing as Harry Strang, a racing aficionado who often enlists the aid of Jack and Cam.
- Shane Jacobson as Barry Tregear, a cop who reluctantly helps with Jack's investigations.
- Damien Richardson as Drew Greer, Jack's former law partner who still occasionally assists him.

=== Supporting ===
- Damien Garvey as Stan (bar owner)
- Terry Norris as Eric Tanner
- John Flaus as Wilbur
- Ronald Falk as Norm
- Kate Atkinson as Simone
- Bob Franklin as Brendan O'Grady
- Deborah Mailman as Cynthia
- Vadim Glowna/David Ritchie as Charlie Taub
- Jacek Koman as Orton
- Ivy Mak as Cherry Blossom
- Neil Melville as Ricky Kirsch
- Emma Booth as Isabel Irish
- Steve Mouzakis as Ryan Neubecker
- Alex Menglet as The Banker

==== Bad Debts (2012) ====
- Colin Friels as Garth Bruce
- Nicholas Bell as Martin Scullin
- Steve Bisley as Kevin Pixley
- Tottie Goldsmith as Jackie Pixley
- Colin Hay as Tony Baker
- Fletcher Humphrys as Wayne Milovich
- Alicia Gardiner as Sue McKillop
- Simon Russell as Danny McKillop
- Marshall Napier as Father Gorman
- Sarah Roberts as Lorna
- Heather Mitchell as Mrs Vane
- Thom Green as Francis

==== Black Tide (2012) ====
- Don Hany as Dave
- Diana Glenn as Lyall Cronin
- Martin Sacks as Steve Levesque
- Alexandra Schepisi as Meryl Canetti
- Lachy Hulme as Dean Canetti
- Ronald Jacobson as Des Connors
- Nicholas Coghlan as Gary Connors
- Rhys Muldoon as Rod Pringle
- Damian de Montemas as Transquik Security Guard
- Daniela Farinacci as Glenda Painter
- Eddie Baroo as Tow Truck Driver

==== Dead Point (2014) ====
- Barry Humphries as Justice Loder
- Madeleine Madden as Marie
- Kat Stewart as Ros
- Vince Colosimo as Mike Cundall
- Fletcher Humphrys as Wayne Milovich
- John Jarratt as Senior Sgt Laurie Olsen
- Kate Beahan as Susan Ayliss
- Ben Gerrard as Xavier
- Sarah Roberts as Lorna
- Tina Bursill as Pat

==== Series 1: Blind Faith (2016) ====
- Claudia Karvan as Sarah Longmore
- Roz Hammond as Sue Shields
- John Bach as Senator Michael Longmore
- Marcus Graham as Rob Shand
- Brooke Satchwell as Tina Longmore
- Peta Brady as Janine Ballich
- Richard Cawthorne as Fraser Boyd
- Robert Morgan as Stedman
- Sacha Horler as Alli Aquaro
- Alvin Anson as Adonis
- Jonicka Movido as Fatma
- Kim Gyngell as Warren Tissot
- Osamah Sami as Hadji Adhib
- Renai Caruso as Helena Shand

==== Series 2: Last Rites (2018) ====
- Tiarnie Coupland as Gus
- Danielle Cormack as Rory Finch
- Helmut Bakaitis as Thornton Finch
- David Whiteley as Phillip Quinn
- Rubi Balasingam as Lakshmi
- George Zhao as Eddie Chin
- Natalia Novikova as Jaeger
- Don Bridges as Dougie Smalls
- Tony Rickards as Razor Ray

==== Series 3: Hell Bent (2021) ====
- Gary Sweet as Detective Phil Maitland
- Alison Whyte as Nina Persky
- Matt Testro as Troy
- Robert Rabiah as Detective Mick Khoury
- Genevieve Picot as Detective Fran Underwood
- Ellen Grimshaw as Casey
- Nicole Nabout as Evie Mansour
- Marta Kaczmarek as Anja
- Damian Walshe-Howling as Daryl Riley

== Telemovies (2012–2014) ==
No. overall	No. in season	Title	Directed by	Written by	Original release date	Australian viewers (millions)
1	1	"Bad Debts"	Jeffrey Walker	Andrew Knight	14 October 2012	0.95
Jack receives a call from ex-client Danny McKillop. Jack goes to help, only to discover that Danny is dead.
2	2	"Black Tide"	Jeffrey Walker	Matt Cameron	21 October 2012	0.85
Des Conners an old friend of the Irish family, comes to consult Jack over the disappearance of his son Gary.
3	3	"Dead Point"	Jeffrey Walker	Matt Cameron	13 April 2014	0.78
Jack is consulted by Justice Loder to recover a mysterious red book.

== Series ==
=== Series 1: Blind Faith (2016) ===
The first season of Jack Irish takes place in both Australia and the Philippines.

No. overall	No. in season	Title	Directed by	Written by	Original release date	Australian viewers (millions)
4	1	"Episode 1"	Kieren Darcy-Smith	Andrew Knight	11 February 2016	0.71
Jack is back to debt collection and Linda takes a job in Manila. Still, Jack soon finds himself involved in some witch hunt that has to do with a massacre that happened in the Philippines years ago.
5	2	"Episode 2"	Kieren Darcy-Smith	Andrew Knight	18 February 2016	0.68
Jack is still working with sculptor Sarah to find out who killed her sister, and bodies start to accumulate. In the meantime, Linda is trying to get her bearings in Manila and is able to help Jack.
6	3	"Episode 3"	Daniel Nettheim	Matt Cameron	25 February 2016	0.61
Jack's investigation leads him to get close to a mega-church pastor, but Linda and her team fall in a trap when they explore an island that seems to be the base for criminals.
7	4	"Episode 4"	Daniel Nettheim	Andrew Anastasios	3 March 2016	0.58
A tense night in the Filipino jungle results in a chance discovery for Linda and Orton. Jack's concerned for Sarah's well-being as she becomes consumed by manic determination following news about Tina.
8	5	"Episode 5"	Mark Joffe	Matt Cameron	10 March 2016	0.61
Jack struggles to recuperate and his mind increasingly turns towards Rob Shand. Back in Manila, Linda is abducted. Longmore refuses to act against the church leaving Jack alone to fight for Sarah.
9	6	"Episode 6"	Mark Joffe	Andrew Knight	17 March 2016	0.67
Jack is now on the run from both the police and members of Via Crucis. Terrified yet resolved, Linda finally comes face to face with her captor.

=== Series 2: Last Rites (2018) ===
The second series of Jack Irish was written by Andrew Knight, playwright Matt Cameron, Elise McCredie and Andrew Anastasios, and directed by Mark Joffe, Kriv Stenders and Fiona Banks. A foreign student studying in Australia passes away after she is fatally hit by a bus in Melbourne's CBD. Irish, together with his partner in crime Cam Delray, must investigate the suspicious circumstances surrounding her death, including the potential for a stalker who may have been following her.

No. overall	No. in season	Title	Directed by	Written by	Original release date	Australian viewers (millions)
10	1	"The Last Post"	Mark Joffe	Andrew Knight	7 July 2018	0.72
The apparent suicide of a foreign student triggers a chain of events that sees Jack risking his life to uncover the truth.
11	2	"Deal with the Dead"	Mark Joffe	Matt Cameron	15 July 2018	0.68
As Jack Irish investigates two deaths, he delves deeper into the murky world of international colleges.
12	3	"From the Ashes"	Kriv Stenders	Elise McCredie	22 July 2018	0.68
As Jack Irish discovers more about the deaths, he isn’t sure who he can trust.
13	4	"The A-List"	Kriv Stenders	Andrew Anastasios	29 July 2018	0.61
Secrets are revealed as Jack Irish's investigation stretches to the colourful streets of Mumbai.
14	5	"Sins of Omission"	Fiona Banks	Matt Cameron	5 August 2018	0.73
As Jack Irish gets closer to the truth, his investigation threatens to tear his world apart.
15	6	"Returning Home"	Fiona Banks	Matt Cameron	12 August 2018	0.72
Jack Irish fights to unmask the truth, but will this fight for justice be his last?

=== Series 3: Hell Bent (2021) ===
The third and final series of Jack Irish went to air on ABC TV from Sunday 13 June 2021 at 8:30pm. Striking painfully close to home, Jack's obsession with unlocking the secrets of the past brings him face-to-face with an adversary more personal and destructive than any other he has known.

No. overall	No. in season	Title	Directed by	Written by	Original release date	Australian viewers (millions)
16	1	"Episode 1"	Greg McLean	Matt Cameron	13 June 2021	0.52
17	2	"Episode 2"	Greg McLean	Andrew Anastasios & Alli Parker	20 June 2021	0.43
18	3	"Episode 3"	Greg McLean	Matt Cameron	27 June 2021	0.39
19	4	"Episode 4"	Greg McLean	Andrew Knight	4 July 2021	0.42

== Viewership ==
Jack Irish is broadcast every Sunday on ABC TV at 8:30pm, AEST.

=== Series 1 (2016) ===
Episode	Title	Original airdate	Overnight viewers	Nightly rank	Consolidated viewers	Adjusted rank
1	"Episode 1"	11 February 2016	0.711	9	0.836	6
2	"Episode 2"	18 February 2016	0.682	9	0.812	6
3	"Episode 3"	25 February 2016	0.617	11	0.729	9
4	"Episode 4"	3 March 2016	0.581	10	0.676	10
5	"Episode 5"	10 March 2016	0.617	11	0.759	9
6	"Episode 6"	17 March 2016	0.673	7	0.838	5

== Awards ==
Jack Irish has been nominated for multiple awards since its initial release to audiences. Pearce was nominated for Best Performance by an Actor in a Mini-Series or Motion Picture Made for Television at the Sichuan TV Festival in 2015 for his portrayal of Jack Irish. Dusseldorp and Mailman were nominated for Best Actress at the Logie Awards in 2017 and 2019 respectively and were both awarded Silver Logies for their performances. Series writer Andrew Knight won the Awgie Award for Television Series or Miniseries of more than 4 hours duration, and was also nominated twice for the Best Television Drama Series as a part of the Australian Academy of Cinema and Television Arts (AACTA) Awards in both 2016 and 2018.

== Production ==
Production of the Jack Irish series was primarily completed in the Melbourne suburb of Fitzroy, in Australia's state of Victoria. The series was produced by Easy Tiger Productions for ABC in association with Film Victoria and Essential Media & Entertainment. The theme song and music were composed by David McCormack, as well as Antony Partos.

The casting for all three series and telemovies were completed by Natalie Wall, Clare Chapman, Kelly Graham, Fiona McMaster and Pearl Mason-Scott.
