= Peter Temple =

Australian crime fiction writer

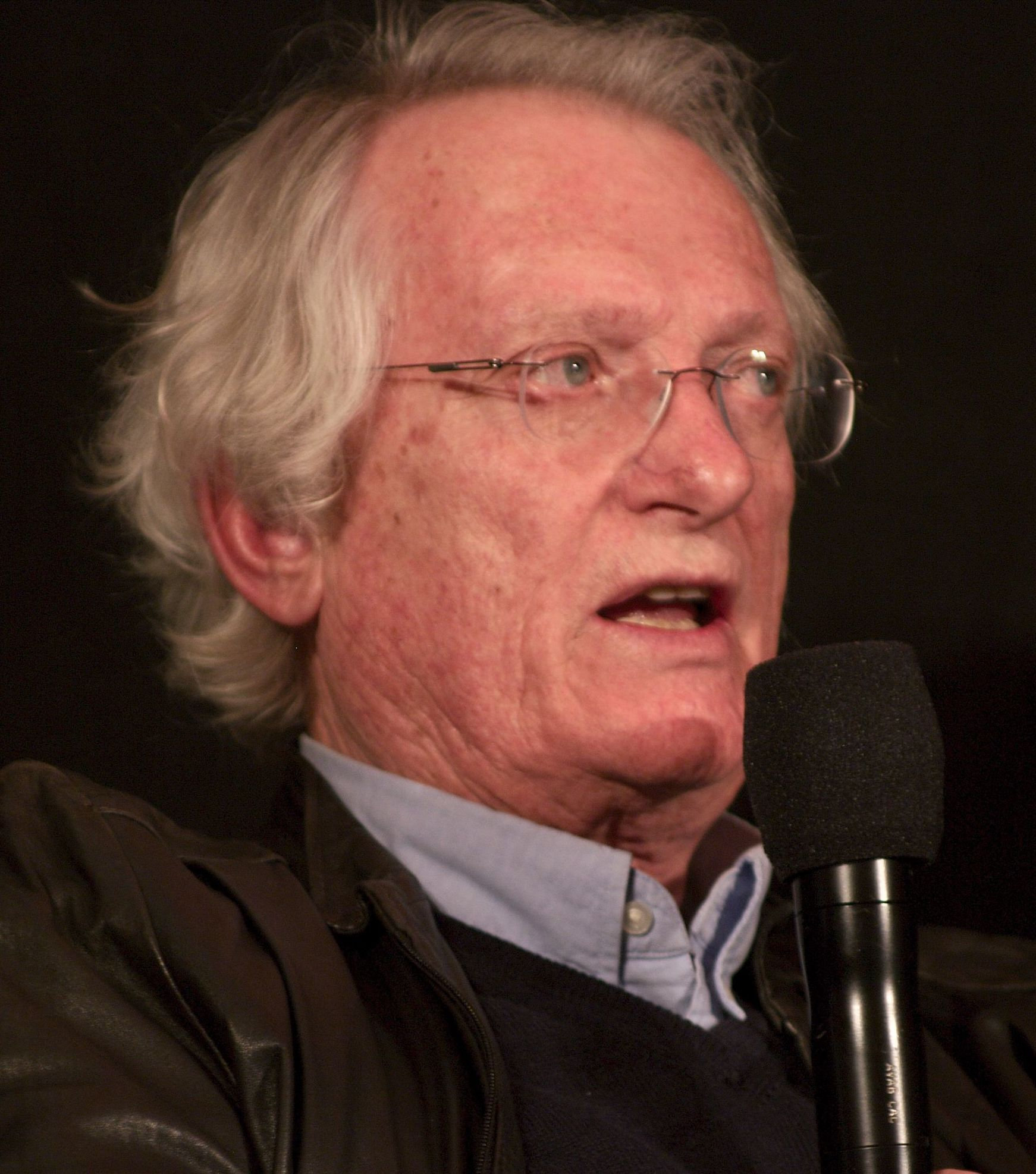
- Peter Temple at Oslo Bokfestival in 2011
- Born: 10 March 1946; South Africa
- Died: 8 March 2018 (aged 71); Ballarat, Victoria, Australia
- Occupation: Writer
- Spouse: Anita
- Children: 1
- Writing career
- Genres: Murder mystery, thriller, crime fiction
- Notable work: Jack Irish series

Peter Temple (10 March 1946 – 8 March 2018) was an Australian crime fiction writer, mainly known for his Jack Irish novel series. He won several awards for his writing, including the Gold Dagger in 2007, the first for an Australian. He was also an international magazine and newspaper journalist and editor.

== Life ==
Peter Temple was born in South Africa in 1946 of Dutch and British/Irish ancestry. He grew up in a small town near South Africa’s border with Botswana. While English was spoken in the family home, he lived in a largely Afrikaans-speaking district and his early schooling was in both English and Afrikaans. At the age of 15 he was sent to school in East London, an area of stronger British heritage.

After school, Temple served a year of national service in the army, stationed at Cape Town. Following that year of service he commenced a cadetship with the major afternoon daily in Cape Town, the Cape Argus, a prominent voice of opposition against the dominant National Party during the apartheid years. During his years with the newspaper, particularly while doing police rounds in the courts of Cape Town, he saw at first hand the degrading effect of apartheid on people of colour and felt the experience changed him.

During his mid-twenties he married his wife, Anita, and moved to Grahamstown (now Makhanda) in the Eastern Cape province to study history and politics at Rhodes University with the intention of becoming an historian. However, he returned to newspapers until he was recruited to teach journalism in the earliest days of that course at Rhodes University.

Temple eventually came to consider himself as "complicit" in the apartheid regime, and after the death of Steve Biko in 1977 he resolved that he had to leave South Africa. With the reluctance of Commonwealth countries to take white South African migrants, he moved instead to Germany that year. Temple managed to secure a job with an English-language news digest in Hamburg, falsely claiming that he could speak German.

Having obtained permanent residence in Germany, he successfully applied to emigrate to Australia and in 1980 he and his wife moved to Sydney, where he worked at the Sydney Morning Herald as education editor, before moving to teach at what is now Charles Sturt University in Bathurst.

In 1982 Temple moved to Melbourne to become the founding editor of Australian Society, a magazine of social issues, where he stayed until 1985. He then returned to teaching, playing a significant role in establishing the prestigious Professional Writing and Editing course at RMIT, Melbourne.

== Author ==
In 1995 Temple retired from teaching to become a self-employed editor and full-time writer. His Jack Irish novels (see below) are set in Melbourne, and feature an unusual lawyer-gambler protagonist. In 2012, the Australian ABC Television and the German ZDF produced the first two as feature-length films with Guy Pearce in the title role under the series title Jack Irish. Temple also wrote three stand-alone novels: An Iron Rose, Shooting Star and In the Evil Day (Identity Theory in the US), as well as The Broken Shore and its semi-sequel, Truth. In 2015 he published "Ithaca in My Mind" in the Allen and Unwin Shorts series. His novels have been published in 20 countries.

He wrote the screenplay for the 2007 TV film Valentine's Day.

=== Jack Irish books ===
Peter Temple wrote four books under the Jack Irish franchise, three of which were awarded the Ned Kelly Award for Crime Writing and Ned Kelly Award for Crime Fiction.

Bad Debts is the first of the four novels, and the first of Temple's crime writing career. It won him the highly prestigious Ned Kelly Award for Crime Writing (under Best True Crime) in 1997. The book has a total of 297 pages and was published by HarperCollins in 1996. Bad Debts follows former lawyer Jack Irish as he returns to the criminal world, as Irish receives an unfamiliar phone call from ex-client Danny McKillop, whom he defended on a hit-and-run charge when he worked as an attorney. When Danny is found dead soon after he is released from prison, Irish must find out why.

Black Tide is the second book in Temple's series, and the only book to have not been nominated for a Ned Kelly Award. It was written in 1999 and has been published into multiple languages, including Dutch. The book has a total of 311 pages, and was published by Bantam Books. In Black Tide, Jack Irish reenters the criminal world when he agrees to search for Des Connors’ missing son, Gary Connors, who also happens to be Irish's last surviving connection to his father. Irish attempts to uncover the truth, as well as any secrets Gary may have been hiding.

Dead Point is the third Jack Irish novel. Like Bad Debts, Dead Point was the recipient of the Ned Kelly Award for Crime Writing, in 2001. The book has a total of 275 pages, and was published by Bantam Books in 2000. In Dead Point, Jack Irish is tasked with locating the missing Robbie Colbourne, who later shows up dead in the local morgue. Irish must solve the various mysteries which occur along the way, including the circumstances which led the occasional barman to disappear.

White Dog is Temple's final book in the Jack Irish series, and the third book in the series to be awarded a Ned Kelly Award for Crime Fiction. Published in 2003 by Text Publishing, the book has a total of 337 pages. In White Dog, a property developer in Irish's hometown of Melbourne is murdered. His ex-girlfriend becomes one of the main suspects as Irish attempts to solve the murder mystery, unveiling secrets and even more complications along the way. Irish must investigate whether she is as guilty as she seems.

In 2019 a 20,000 word fragment of an unfinished Jack Irish novel, provisionally titled High Art, appeared in a posthumous collection of Temple’s writing, The Red Hand.

=== Awards ===
In 2010, Peter Temple won the Miles Franklin Award for his novel Truth. He has also won five Ned Kelly Awards for crime fiction, the latest in 2006 for The Broken Shore, which also won the Colin Roderick Award for best Australian book and the Australian Book Publishers' Award for best general fiction. The Broken Shore also won the Crime Writers' Association Duncan Lawrie Dagger (Gold Dagger) in 2007. Temple is the first Australian to win a Gold Dagger.

ABC Television broadcast an adapted telemovie of The Broken Shore on 2 February 2014.

== Personal life ==
Temple was married to Anita and had a son, Nicholas. He died in Ballarat, Victoria, Australia, on 8 March 2018 at the age of 71 after a brief battle with cancer.

== Awards and nominations ==
H. R. F. Keating Award, CrimeFest Awards	2021	The Red Hand: Stories, Reflections and the Last Appearance of Jack Irish (shortlisted)
Miles Franklin Award	2010	Truth (winner)
Australian Book Industry Awards Australian General Fiction Book of the Year	2006	The Broken Shore (winner)
Colin Roderick Award	2006	The Broken Shore (winner)
Duncan Lawrie Dagger	2007	The Broken Shore (winner)
Miles Franklin Award	2006	The Broken Shore (longlisted)
Ned Kelly Awards Best Novel	2006	The Broken Shore (joint winner)
Ned Kelly Awards Best Novel	2003	White Dog (winner)
Ned Kelly Awards Best Novel	2001	Dead Point (joint winner)
Ned Kelly Awards Best Novel	2000	Shooting Star (winner)
Ned Kelly Awards Best First Novel	1997	Bad Debts (joint winner)

== Bibliography ==
=== Jack Irish novels ===
- Bad Debts (1996)
- Black Tide (1999)
- Dead Point (2000)
- White Dog (2003)

=== Other novels ===
- An Iron Rose (1998)
- Shooting Star (1999)
- In the Evil Day (2002) aka Identity Theory
- The Broken Shore (2005)
- Truth (2009)

=== Anthology ===
- The Red Hand: Stories, Reflections and the Last Appearance of Jack Irish (2019)
