= The Broken Shore (novel) =

Book by Peter Temple

- First edition
- Author: Peter Temple
- Language: English
- Genre: Crime fiction
- Publisher: Text Publishing, Australia
- Publication date: 2005
- Publication place: Australia
- Media type: Print (Hardback & Paperback)
- Pages: 345 pp
- ISBN: 1-920885-77-3
- OCLC: 62116825
- Followed by: Truth

The Broken Shore (2005) is a Duncan Lawrie Dagger award-winning novel by the Australian author Peter Temple.

== Synopsis ==
The novel's central character is Joe Cashin, a Melbourne homicide detective. Following serious physical injuries, he is posted to his hometown Port Munro, where he begins the process of rebuilding the old family mansion as well as his physical and mental strength. Against a background of family tragedy, politics, police corruption, and racism, he investigates the death of a wealthy local man, Charles Burgoyne. His closest friend and police superior, Villani, is the central character in the sequel novel Truth.

== Style ==
Written by the award-winning author Peter Temple, the book continues with his trademark stark, staccato dialogue, in which superfluous words are removed and the meaning of each sentence must be dug out. In a typical example of Temple's flourish, he describes a nearby derelict town as “hardcore—the unemployed, under-employed, unemployable, the drunk and doped, the old-age pensioners, people on all kinds of welfare, the halt, the lame".

== Awards ==
- Crime Writers' Association (UK), The Duncan Lawrie Dagger, 2007: winner
- Miles Franklin Literary Award, 2006: longlisted
- Australian Book Industry Awards (ABIA), Australian General Fiction Book of the Year, 2006: winner
- Ned Kelly Awards for Crime Writing, Best Novel, 2006: joint winner
- Colin Roderick Award, 2005: winner

== Interviews ==
- Time Out New York

== Reviews ==
- "The Age"
- "Detectives Beyond Borders" Part 1, Part 2
- Island Volume 104
- "Light Reading"
- "Mostly Fiction"
- "Reading Matters"

== Telemovie ==
The Broken Shore was adapted for television by writer Andrew Knight.

The movie had its world premiere at the Adelaide Film Festival on 15 October 2013. It aired on the ABC on 2 February 2014.
