= Bad Debts =

1996 novel by Peter Temple

- First edition
- Author: Peter Temple
- Language: English
- Series: Jack Irish series
- Genre: crime novel
- Publisher: HarperCollins, Australia
- Publication date: 1996
- Publication place: Australia
- Media type: Print (Paperback)
- Pages: 297 pp
- ISBN: 0-7322-5816-2
- OCLC: 38392026
- Followed by: An Iron Rose

Bad Debts (1996) is a Ned Kelly Award-winning novel by Australian author Peter Temple. This is the first novel in the author's Jack Irish series.

== Dedication ==
"For Anita and Nicholas : true believers."

== Awards ==
- Ned Kelly Awards for Crime Writing, Best First Novel, 1997: joint winner

== Publication history ==
- Also published in USA (in 2005 by MacAdam/Cage), in Canada (in 2006 by Anchor Canada), in the UK (in 2007 by Quercus) and in the Netherlands, in a Dutch-language edition (in 2002 by De Boekerij) with a translation by Paul Witte.

== Television adaptation ==
- This novel was adapted into an Australian television movie Jack Irish: Bad Debts in 2016, which was directed by Jeffrey Walker, from a script by Peter Temple, and featuring Guy Pearce in the lead role.

== Reviews ==
- Publishers Weekly
- Reviewing the Evidence
