= Murder of Michael McGurk =

2009 contract killing in Australia

- Date: 5 September 2009
- Location: Cremorne, Sydney, New South Wales, Australia
- Type: Murder; Assassination
- Cause: Single gunshot to the head
- Motive: Legal and financial disputes
- Convicted: 1. Fortunato "Lucky" Gattellari; 2. Senad Kaminic; 3. Haissam Safetli; 4. Christopher Estephan; 5. Ron Medich
- Convictions: 1. Guilty of soliciting the murder of McGurk and being an accessory after the fact 2. Guilty of being an accessory before and after the fact 3. Guilty of the murder of McGurk and guilty of intimidating McGurk's wife 4. Guilty of the murder of McGurk; 5. Guilty of ordering the murder of McGurk and guilty of intimidating McGurk's wife
- Sentence: 1. 10 years' jail 2. 4½ years' jail 3. 7 years' jail 4. 6 years and 5 months' jail 5. 39 years' jail

The murder of Michael McGurk was an Australian contract killing. McGurk, a Scottish-born Australian businessman, was murdered by a single gunshot to his head on 3 September 2009 outside his Cremorne, Sydney family home. In October 2010 five men were arrested and several charges laid; and by April 2013 four of them had been convicted and jailed in connection with the murder of McGurk. The last accused, businessman Ron Medich, was, in April 2018, found guilty by a jury in the Supreme Court of New South Wales of orchestrating the murder of McGurk, and of intimidating McGurk's wife. In June 2018 Medich was sentenced to a 39-years custodial sentence, with a 30 year non-parole period.

== Michael McGurk ==
Michael McGurk
- Born: Mick Rushford; 1958; Glasgow, Scotland
- Died: 3 September 2009 (aged 50–51); Cremorne, Sydney, New South Wales, Australia
- Cause of death: Gunshot wound to his head
- Occupation: Businessman

McGurk, born Mick Rushford in 1958 in Glasgow, Scotland, was raised in the Gorbals notorious slum area by his grandmother and brothers; although some media reports claim that Rushford was raised in Edinburgh.

Rushford travelled to Australia in 1993, where he began working with ECC Lighting, in inner Sydney. Whilst he was employed at ECC, Customs officers found out that Rushford had overstayed his temporary visa. Served with a deportation notice, Rushford left Australia, travelling to New Zealand, via Fiji, and returned with a new passport and new identity as Michael Loch McGurk, altering his birth date from 1958 to 1964.

McGurk rose far above his impoverished roots, living in a $4 million home, driving a Mercedes S-Class, and taking luxury ski holidays. Described by some media agencies as an alcoholic and a heavy cocaine user, McGurk was variously reported as the director of 28 failed or deregistered companies; a standover man, fixer and debt collector; a lender of last resort; negotiator; and a property developer. Media reports claim that McGurk was involved in supplying prostitutes to high-profile people, including leading sports figures and, in the last weeks of his life, was negotiating a property deal with associates of nightclub identity John Ibrahim.

=== Business links with Ron Medich ===
His main trading vehicle, Bentley Smythe and associated companies, Bentley Smythe Financial Services, Bentley Smythe Mortgage Fund No 1, and Bentley Smythe Mortgage Fund No 2, were all reportedly solvent at the time of his death. Eagle Street Finance, a wholly owned subsidiary of Brisbane-based H&G Corporate, had a registered mortgage over the assets of Bentley Smythe Mortgage Fund No 1. His sometime business partner and BRW Rich 200 member, Ron Medich had an interest in one of McGurk's companies, Business Investment Opportunities. Of the ten million shares in this company (issued at $1 each), Ron Medich Properties owned 380,000 of the shares, with the remainder owned by Celtic Sydney, a company wholly owned and controlled by McGurk.

Other media reports claimed that McGurk died owing millions. McGurk was reportedly two months in arrears on the $2.4 million mortgage on his Cremorne house to the mortgagee, Bankwest. In investigating the details provided at time of approving the loan, Bankwest found that the information supplied by McGurk was allegedly fraudulent. The tax files and pay slips McGurk had provided to obtain the loan had been forged. Title to the house was in the name of McGurk's wife. Following revelations of the fraud, Bankwest advised McGurk that, as mortgagee, it intended to sell the property. McGurk sought assistance from Medich who reportedly lent him $3.6 million to pay out Bankwest. McGurk also owed Medich $10 million at the time of his death, relating to Medich's equity in Business Investment Opportunities.

In an interesting twist of fate, Medich, together with Graham Richardson, a political lobbyist and former Labor federal minister, met Sam Haddad, the Director-General of NSW Planning, the day before the alleged murder of McGurk and reportedly discussed why Haddad overrode senior planning officials' recommendation that the Medich land be rezoned after a meeting with Frank Sartor, at the time the Labor NSW Minister for Planning. Reports of the financial relationship between Medich and Richardson varied, with McGurk alleging to Herald journalists that Richardson was on a retainer of $25,000 per month, whereas Medich claimed that Richardson was being paid $5,000 per month.

==== Civil dispute between Medich and McGurk ====
In various media reports, it was claimed that Medich and McGurk were in dispute, including matters that were brought before the Federal Court by Medich against McGurk and his wife, and various companies associated with McGurk. These matters were heard by the Court and dismissed on 8 April 2009, due to Medich failing to disclose material facts. Costs were awarded against Medich. In another matter that is yet to be resolved, Medich and McGurks' executors are in dispute.

=== Other business links ===
Prior to his death, McGurk was negotiating a property deal for Bob Ell, a BRW Rich 200 billionaire. Ell's company, Leda Holdings, had interest in Kings Cross landmark property, the Crest Hotel. Ell sought to redevelop the Crest and buy the property from Australand for $70 million. According to media reports, McGurk was negotiating on behalf of Ell and for business associates of John Ibrahim to run the downstairs bar area of the Crest in return for an investment of $10–$15 million. McGurk was working with Ell to collect rent from tenants and met disgraced former company director, Jim Byrnes. Despite initially being on opposing sides of negotiations, Byrne and McGurk would later form a friendship, and work together for Ell. Leda Holdings held a $450,000 mortgage over McGurk's city office on York Street, Sydney – which is owned by McGurk's wife. It was reported that Australand rejected the McGurk's proposal just days before his death.

McGurk's company, Bentley Smythe, had previously lent up to $1 million to businessman Richard Woods. Woods was the owner of a bathhouse which was beset by leaking water problems, located on the first floor of the Crest Hotel building. Theo Baker, a Sydney telecommunications and financial software millionaire and another BRW Rich 200 member, provided McGurk with a $300,000 loan to retain his black Mercedes S-class, following repossession of the vehicle by a finance company. Baker's loan was also secured by a mortgage against a city property owned by McGurk's wife.

HSBC Bank Australia held a second mortgage over the Cremorne family home. It was reported that HSBC, as mortgagee in possession, placed a property owned by McGurk, located in Orlando Avenue, Cremorne, up for mortgagee sale.

At various times McGurk's business associates included Mark Burby, a Jersey businessman, who together with McGurk were allegedly planning to blackmail the Sultan of Brunei following an earlier unsuccessful attempt to sue the Sultan for reneging on a deal to buy a 400-year-old miniature Koran. According to Burby, the blackmail related to "...an ongoing private matter involving one of the Sultan's relatives".

=== Closed or failed companies ===
The closed and failed companies associated with McGurk and financial position (where known) included:

- Tandew – The Federal Court ordered liquidation of the company in February 2007 following an application by the Deputy Commissioner of Taxation. Debts of $1.95 million were outstanding
- Australian Residential Land Company – application for voluntary deregistration lodged on 24 July 2009 by the directors, McGurk and Medich. The sole shareholder of this company is a company whose directors include Neville Wran, a former Labor Premier
- Acett – Ron Medich Properties (a company controlled by Medich) made application on 15 April 2009 for Acett to be wound up; and later withdrew the application
- The Australian Hotel Group – liquidators were appointed in September 2005. McGurk was not a director of this company at this point in time; serving as a director between 2001 and 2004. It was reported that in April 2008, the company has debts of $4.4 million to 24 creditors
- Chilfunky
- Amswell
- MMG Investments
- ATC Growth
- Re-Educate
- Thermoelectric International
- Sports Management International
- Australian Telecommunications Consortium
- Grand Prix Swimming

=== Connections with the Labor Party ===
McGurk had also been lobbying on the sale of Currawong, a 23-hectare (57-acre) Pittwater site owned by Unions NSW. Moses Obeid, the son of disgraced former Labor powerbroker Eddie Obeid, helped McGurk negotiate with John Robertson, then Secretary of Unions NSW. Following McGurk's death, Robertson stated that McGurk was representing Medich and that while their $30 million bid for Currawong was the highest, it was conditional on development approval. Unions NSW accepted a bid for a lesser amount, because there were no conditions attached.

Richard Vereker, an associate of McGurk and aged 68 at the time of McGurk's death, was mentioned in a 2008 ICAC inquiry involving Wollongong City Council. At this Inquiry, ICAC found that eleven individuals engaged in various forms of corrupt conduct between 2004 and 2007. Vereker, a former butcher, bookmaker, and Wollongong businessman, had reportedly facilitated a meeting between McGurk and Graham Richardson that later led to McGurk attempting to exhort Medich. Vereker, a disability pensioner, was reportedly NSW Labor's second largest individual donor, with a political donation of $75,000 in the 2007 state election campaign. On 1 July 2010, Vereker, with Mark Abernethy, published a biography of McGurk, called The Fast Life and Sudden Death of Michael McGurk.

The Sydney Morning Herald also revealed links with Craig Knowles, a former NSW Planning Minister, and with Lucas Neill, a captain of the Socceroos, in McGurk's alleged role as a financial middleman for the set-up of a proposed western Sydney A-League soccer team. The registered office of Sydney Wanderers Football Club, the legal entity of the new club, was the offices of Bentley Smythe in York Street, Sydney – McGurk's place of business. The proposal to set up the new soccer club collapsed on 2 September 2009, the day before McGurk's murder. It was later revealed that McGurk was acting on behalf of Paddy Dominguez, Neil's manager and Bob Ell, a potential sponsor of the soccer club.

== Criminal investigations against McGurk ==
In early 2009, McGurk had been charged with assault and two charges of firebombing houses, one of which was that of Adam Tilley, allegedly firebombing the Point Piper home in November 2008. Tilley purchased the Wolseley Road mansion from Medich for $12.5 million in 2004. Central to the dispute between Tilley, Medich, and McGurk was an agreement for Tilley and Medich to develop land adjoining the Wolseley Road property that could potentially yield Medich $20 million (net). As the Great Recession resulted in a dip in property market values, Medich assigned his $10 million interest in the Point Piper property to McGurk. McGurk allegedly demanded Tilley repay the maximum $20 million. McGurk commenced action in the Supreme Court when his demands were refused. Two weeks prior to his murder, the NSW Director of Public Prosecutions dropped the charges, including the alleged firebombing of another property in Queen Street, Beaconsfield, owned by the valuer Stuart Rowan.

McGurk had also been charged in connection with an assault on Rowan after Rowan refused to provide McGurk with a valuation on a Bathurst property. Other charges that were dropped related to the alleged assault on a former employee, Will Manning with a cricket bat and further counts of arson relating to the firebombing of a former business associate's Cremorne property. Media reports claim that McGurk was involved in the alleged firebombing of a Balmoral house, owned by Justin Brown (of CB Richard Ellis); although Brown never pressed charges against McGurk. Brown was also assaulted in his office – allegedly on McGurk's instructions.

=== Other criminal allegations against McGurk ===
Following McGurk's death, an unnamed criminal, aged 73, prosecuted for fraud and in custody at the time of McGurk's death, alleges that he was kidnapped and tortured by associates of McGurk because he was trying to leave a gang that was undertaking systemic and organised superannuation fraud. Apparently police were aware of the alleged fraud scheme (operating between 2003 and 2005) and grossed in excess of $2 million for McGurk; but were unable to obtain a clear link to prove McGurk was involved, despite the man making the allegations was living in a property owned by McGurk.

== Murder ==
McGurk was killed by a single gunshot to his head some time between 6:30 pm and 6:45 pm on 3 September 2009 outside his family home in Cranbrook Avenue, Cremorne. McGurk lived in the house with his wife, Kimberley, and their four children and were reportedly "...a Catholic family, a lovely family." According to friends and McGurk's priest, he was a generous man and doting father. McGurk's nine-year-old son, Luc, was with him at the time of the shooting and is reported to have been a witness to the murder. Emergency services were called to the murder scene and rendered assistance to McGurk, but he could not be saved and died at the scene of the shooting.

=== Funeral ===
McGurk's life was celebrated at a public funeral held in at Mosman's Sacred Heart Catholic Church, where more than 300 people were in attendance. His children recalled a loving, benevolent family man and soccer coach. McGurk's youngest daughter Nicola, aged 11, was reported as saying:

"You are the best dad in the whole wide world and I love and still love you more than anything."

A letter written by Luc for Father's Day was read to the congregation:

"I remember when we went to my first soccer gala day and you were the one on the sideline cheering me on," he wrote.

His other son, Lochlan wrote:

"Thanks, dad, for all the time we have had together. I will miss you."

McGurk's eldest daughter Mia, aged 12, was reported as saying to the congregation:

"He always gave to the poor and wouldn't expect anything in return. He was a great businessman. If Dad ever saw anything that needed to be fixed, he'd fix it straightaway."

McGurk's father, Bob, and his brothers, Edward and Bobby, travelled from Scotland to attend the funeral.

=== Tape revelations ===
Within days of McGurk's death, it was revealed that McGurk had a tape recording of a conversation with Medich, which McGurk was allegedly using to try to extort money from Medich. It was alleged that Medich was attempting to influence government officials by improper means. It was reported that Medich sought planning approval to rezone land that he owned at Badgerys Creek on the south-western fringes of Sydney. There was immense and, what some described as, sensational, media coverage about these tapes, their content, and possible ramifications. On 5 September 2009 The Sydney Morning Herald published on its front-page, "Exclusive: Secret tape blamed for killing". Directly below the banner: "It could bring down the Government."

The following day Graham Richardson, a former Hawke and Keating Labor federal government minister and now political lobbyist, told Channel Nine that he had heard the tape and that the key part which apparently exposed the Labor figures was inaudible. Richardson stated that McGurk was allegedly trying to blackmail Medich for $8 million and that in about June 2009 Richardson had provided a formal statement to NSW Police. Commenting on Richardson's very public denial of the tapes containing any matter of substance, Jennifer Hewett, national affairs columnist with The Australian, wrote:

The very notion that Richardson – a man normally desperate to avoid contributing to his media profile these days – is so determined to publicly dismiss the significance of the tape should set off plenty of alarms.

On 8 September 2009, NSW Police passed a copy of this tape to the Independent Commission Against Corruption (ICAC). However, the NSW Opposition called for a Parliamentary Inquiry. On 9 September 2009, a motion was carried in the Legislative Council to establish an inquiry into Badgerys Creek land dealings and planning decisions. The inquiry's Terms of Reference included inquiring into and "report on land dealings and planning decisions relating to land or interests in land held solely or jointly by Ron Medich Properties Pty Ltd and Roy Medich Properties Pty Ltd in or around Badgerys Creek", with a particular focus on roles of the Minister for Planning, other Ministers, NSW Planning, other government agencies, members of parliament, political parties and lobbyists, and to make recommendations about planning integrity. Fourteen submissions were received, including submissions from Richardson, NSW Planning (via Sam Haddad), the Property Council of Australia, and Penrith City Council. Public hearings were held on:

- 29 September 2009 – appearing were Haddad and other NSW Planning officials, Kristina Keneally in her capacity as Minister for Planning, and both Roy and Ron Medich;
- 19 October 2009 – appearing were Frank Sartor, in his capacity as a former Minister for Planning, Richardson, and Haddad and other NSW Planning officials; and
- 14 December 2009 – Richardson again appeared.

An interim report was tabled to Parliament on 20 November 2009, and made eleven recommendations with a focus on stronger regulation of contact between planning officials, development proponents and lobbyists. The Committee also recommended tighter regulation of political donations. The second supplementary report was tabled on 25 February 2010 and only became necessary as a result of Richardson's unwillingness to respond in writing to questions submitted after his evidence at the Committee's first hearing.

Meanwhile, based on information in the recording plus media reports and information provided by an inmate in a correction centre, ICAC identified thirteen matters for investigation. A public enquiry was held over five days, and commenced on 1 February 2010. Medich, Haddad, and Richardson all gave evidence at the ICAC Inquiry. The Commissioner determined that there were no findings of corrupt conduct; and was unable to substantiate any of the thirteen allegations.

=== Arrests ===
On 13 October 2010, thirteen months after the murder of McGurk, homicide detectives arrested the following:

- Fortunato "Lucky" Gattellari (60), a former Australian featherweight boxing champion and brother of Rocky Gattellari – charged with soliciting the murder of McGurk and being an accessory after the fact
- Senad Kaminic (42), a former Bosnian soldier and business associate of Gattellari – charged with being an accessory before and after the fact
- Haissam Safetli (45) – charged with murder of McGurk
- Christopher Estephan (20) – charged with murder of McGurk

It was reported that four days after the murder of McGurk, police seized a number of weapons from Gattellari's home. Media reports claim that Gattellari was appointed a director to a number of companies associated with Medich in July 2009. Court documents lodged by police, allege that some time after 1 May 2009, Gattellari solicited Safetli to murder McGurk and that for more than thirteen months after the killing "did receive, harbour, maintain, and assist" Safetli. Medich, who has reportedly known Gattellari from childhood, had lent millions to Gattellari, including $4.8 million between November 2009 and October 2010 and $16 million in total, through various joint ventures.

On 27 October 2010, police also arrested McGurk's business associate Ronald Edward "Ron" Medich, and charged him with soliciting to murder McGurk. Police alleged that Medich was the mastermind of the murder plot. Police arrested Medich at his solicitor's office and it was reported that Gattellari agreed to give evidence against Medich in defence of his own conspiracy charges. It was also reported that Safetli was prepared to give evidence against Medich. Despite Medich offering to put up $1 million in surety and his younger brother Roy Medich offering $500,000 in cash, bail was refused. A few days later, Medich was charged with murder of McGurk. Much media attention was made of Medich's fall from grace, as he spent a little under two months in solitary confinement whilst in custody, before being released on conditional bail. In a 2013 committal hearing, Medich pleaded not guilty to the murder of McGurk, and pleaded not guilty to a charge of intimidation in relation to McGurk's wife. A trial date of August 2014 was set, before Justice Megan Latham.

=== Convictions ===
In April 2013, 'Lucky' Gattellari was sentenced by Justice Megan Latham at the NSW Supreme Court to a maximum of 10 years. He was eligible for parole on 13 April 2018 and, after the NSW Parole Board refused parole, Gattellari lodged an appeal against the decision. Gattellari is facing further charges, together with Roger Rogerson and Glen McNamara, for allegedly attempting to extort Medich.

Kaminic was sentenced to a minimum 2½ years in jail and a maximum of 4½ and was eligible for parole in November 2017.

In April 2013, Estephan was sentenced by Justice Geoffrey Bellew to a maximum of 6 years and 5 months' jail, with a minimum non-parole period of 5 years. He was eligible for parole on 12 October 2015.

In August 2013, Haissam Safetli was sentenced to 6½ years' jail for the murder of McGurk, and another six months for intimidating his widow.

After a jury failed to reach a verdict in a 2017 trial, Medich was again tried before a Supreme Court jury and, on 23 April 2018, was found guilty of ordering the murder of McGurk, and of intimidating McGurk's wife. Medich had pleaded not guilty to both charges. On 21 June 2018 in the Supreme Court, Medich was sentenced to a custodial sentence of 39 years; with a minimum non-parole period of 30 years.
