= Eddie Obeid =

Australian politician (born 1943)

Minister for Mineral Resources
- In office 8 April 1999 – 2 April 2003
- Premier: Bob Carr
- Preceded by: Bob Martin
- Succeeded by: Kerry Hickey

Minister for Fisheries
- In office 8 April 1999 – 2 April 2003
- Premier: Bob Carr
- Preceded by: Bob Martin
- Succeeded by: Ian Macdonald

Member of the New South Wales Legislative Council
- In office 12 September 1991 – 10 May 2011
- Preceded by: Jack Hallam
- Succeeded by: Walt Secord

Personal details
- Born: Edward Moses Obeid; 25 October 1943 (age 83) Matrite, Greater Lebanon
- Party: Labor Party (1972-2013)
- Spouse: Judith Obeid (m.1965)
- Children: Nine

Edward Moses Obeid (born 25 October 1943) is a retired Australian politician and convicted criminal, who served as a member of the New South Wales Legislative Council between 1991 and 2011, representing the Labor Party. He was the Minister for Fisheries and the Minister for Mineral Resources from 1999–2003. Prior to the March 2015 expiry of his term in the Legislative Council, Obeid announced his decision to retire early on 10 May 2011, citing family reasons. In March 2026, it was reported that the NSW government has frozen approximately $AU30 million of Obeids assets.

During his parliamentary career, Obeid was considered by many to be a "power broker" in the New South Wales Labor Party, belonging to the dominant right-wing sub-faction, often referred to as The Terrigals, so named as its inaugural meeting was held at Obeid's beach house in Terrigal. It was reported that Obeid might retire at the 2011 state election, prior to the expiry of his term; however, he waited until the election was concluded. Obeid, who joined the Labor Party in 1972, was expelled from the party in May 2013 for bringing the party into disrepute.

A series of three investigative hearings by the Independent Commission Against Corruption between 2012 and 2014 into the conduct of Obeid and others found that Obeid acted in a corrupt manner in relation to cafe leases at Circular Quay and that he misused his position as a Member of Parliament to benefit his family's financial interests in both Direct Health Solutions and in water licences over the family's Bylong Valley farm. In June 2014, the Commission recommended the Director of Public Prosecutions (DPP) consider prosecuting Obeid for the offence of misconduct in public office over his attempts to influence bureaucrats and Labor colleagues to benefit his family. In 2013, the DPP announced that it would be prosecuting Obeid for misconduct in public office, and a criminal trial in the Supreme Court of New South Wales began in February 2016. Obeid pleaded not guilty; however, a jury found Obeid guilty of misconduct in public office. He was sentenced to five years in jail with a non-parole period of three years. In separate proceedings, Obeid, together with one of his sons, Moses, and former Labor minister, Ian Macdonald, were charged with conspiracy for Macdonald to conduct misconduct in public office and grant a mining lease over the Obeid’s family farm at Bylong. In July 2021, all three were found guilty; and on 21 October Obeid was sentenced to seven years in jail, with a non-parole period of five years and three months. Obeid, Moses Obeid, and Macdonald, lodged an appeal against their conviction, which was dismissed in October 2023. Obeid served his sentence in Cooma Correctional Centre. He was released on parole on 20 August 2025.

== Early years and background ==
Obeid was born in the village of Matrite (sometimes called Metrit or Mitrit), a village in Northern Lebanon with a Maronite Catholic majority, in Lebanon. At age 6, he migrated to Australia with his family and they settled in Redfern, growing up in a terrace house. A dual Lebanese–Australian citizen, of Lebanese Maronite Catholic faith, Obeid was an altar boy, sold newspapers from a street corner, and collected deposits on soft drink bottles. Obeid married Judith in 1965, is now father of nine children and a grandfather of 31 grandchildren. At age 29 in 1972, Obeid joined the Labor Party.

Prior to entering parliament, Obeid held a range of voluntary roles that included a Trustee of the Art Gallery of New South Wales (1980–1982), a part-time Commissioner of the Ethnic Affairs Commission (1981–1985), a vice-president of the Ethnic Press Association of Australia (1981–1986), a director of the Western Suburbs Hospital Board (sic) (1983–1986), on the Board of Governors of the Law Foundation of New South Wales (1985–1988), the lead of the Australian-Lebanese hostage negotiation mission to Iraq (December 1990), and was the patron of the Australian Lebanese Christian Federation.

== Political career ==
Elected to the Legislative Council in 1991 to replace Jack Hallam, despite a brief carriage of junior ministerial responsibilities in the second Carr ministry, Obeid's main contribution to parliament has been through Committee representation and his ability to manipulate factional numbers and votes. At the time of his resignation from the Council, Obeid claimed that his most satisfying moment in politics was to assist in the passage of legislation to help building sub-contractors.

His term in parliament was dogged by controversy, including:

- allegations of improper involvement in a proposed housing redevelopment in 2002, for which he was subsequently cleared by the Independent Commission Against Corruption.
- 2002 revelations that Obeid had failed to disclose all his business interests on Parliament's pecuniary interests register
- 2003 allegations that Obeid promised to secure the seat of Parramatta, and an early ministry for David Borger if he dumped the Left faction and joined the dominant Right
- 2004 censure motion due to Obeid's undue influence in the elections of Matrite Council
- 2004 claims that Obeid had exerted undue influence on family members
- 2006 attempts to dump Obeid from the 2007 state election in favour of a Muslim candidate
- 2007 influence in the composition of the Iemma ministry and Iemma's demise
- 2009 influence in the composition of the Rees ministry
- 2009 representations to NSW Minister for Roads, Michael Daley, on behalf of Mid-Western Regional Council for funding to seal a 1.5 km stretch of roadway near Obeid's family property near Mudgee. Obeid failed to disclose his business interest
- 2009 allegations of linkages between Obeid, his son, Moses, former Labor powerbroker and current lobbyist, Graham Richardson, businessman, Ron Medich and the murder of Michael McGurk
- 2009–2010 allegations that Obeid, together with right-wing Terrigals sub-factional colleague Joe Tripodi, influenced the election and make-up of the Kristina Keneally ministry

A large number of the allegations against Obeid were generated by Fairfax Media's, Sydney Morning Herald. In 2003, following Obeid's decision to not seek re-election to the fourth Carr ministry, he was quoted as saying: "[…] my decision will ensure that Government is not distracted by the campaign of innuendo, vilification and unsubstantiated allegation launched against me by The Sydney Morning Herald. This campaign shows no sign of abating and until my defamation action against the Herald is resolved in the courts, any work I did as a minister could be overshadowed."

Announcing his decision to retire from the Legislative Council on 10 May 2011, Obeid issued a statement that his granddaughter, Gisele, was diagnosed with cancer tumours in her kidneys in November 2010 and that, despite an operation and extensive chemotherapy, recent scans suggest some of the tumours remain. He said: "My wife and I need to spend all our time supporting our son Moses and his wife Nikki through this difficult time." Walt Secord, the former chief of staff to the former Premier, Kristina Keneally was nominated by Labor to fill the casual vacancy.

== Business interests and corruption findings ==
Initially working as a taxi driver and then property developer, the source of Obeid's initial wealth and business is not clear. However, it is known that Obeid, together with his two brothers, inherited their father's estate that comprised land and houses in Lebanon. In 1973, Obeid together with business partners, purchased an interest in the recently established Arabic press, El-Telegraph, with Obeid later buying out his business partners. Obeid has since sold his stake and is, "no longer the publisher of that paper".

In September 2002, The Sydney Morning Herald alleged that Obeid was one of NSW's richest members of parliament. Media reports claimed that Obeid had purchased a property in Clovelly for A$875,000 in 1991 and the following day sold the property to the New South Wales Department of Housing for A$1.1 million. The Herald also claimed that two companies associated with Obeid have had debts of $AUD5 million written off by various banks. It was also alleged that the Obeid family trust secured a loan from the Colonial State Bank for A$18 million.

These allegations arose at the same time as The Herald alleged that Obeid had attempted to solicit a A$1 million payment in return for promising NSW Government support for the Canterbury Bulldogs League Club's A$800 million Oasis housing development in south-western Sydney. As a result of these allegations, the Independent Commission Against Corruption (ICAC) conducted an inquiry and found that there was no evidence that any donation was made to the Labor Party in relation to the project. The Commission made a finding that Obeid had never solicited a donation and cleared him of any wrongdoing. In the meantime, The Herald reports for a series of articles concerning Canterbury Bulldogs salary cap breaches and the above (false) allegations had won a Gold Walkley. Obeid commenced defamation action against Fairfax Media and in 2006 the Supreme Court found that Obeid had been defamed and that the media article had contributed to Obeid losing his job as a NSW minister. Obeid was awarded A$162,173 in damages, plus costs believed to have been more than A$1 million. Walkley Awards organisers later said the judging panel, "would not have awarded the prize if it had known the allegations against Mr Obeid would be found to be unsubstantiated".

Obeid's family have property interests in Lebanon, Port Macquarie, Terrigal, Bylong Valley, Woolwich and Hunters Hill, and Concord (since sold); and business interests in live sheep exporting to Syria and Iraq, leases on cafes at Circular Quay that later developed into further scandal & criminal prosecutions, and the marina at Elizabeth Bay.

=== ICAC investigations ===
==== Operations Jasper and Acacia ====
In November 2012, the New South Wales ICAC began a series of investigative hearings relating to Obeid's alleged property and mining interests. This inquiry concerned, among other issues, the circumstances surrounding a decision made in 2008 by the then Minister for Primary Industries and Minister for Mineral Resources, Ian Macdonald, to open a mining area in the Bylong Valley for coal exploration. These circumstances include whether Macdonald's decision was influenced by Obeid. After the presentation of the ICAC's opening statements in 2012, NSW Opposition Leader, John Robertson asked the NSW Labor Party to suspend Obeid's party membership; which was subsequently terminated in mid-2013. The witnesses list for the inquiry included former NSW Premiers Morris Iemma and Nathan Rees.

On 31 July 2013 the ICAC found that Obeid, Macdonald, and others engaged in corrupt conduct in relation to their actions involving the Mount Penny mining tenement in the Bylong Valley. The ICAC found that Obeid engaged in corrupt conduct by entering into agreements with Macdonald, whereby Macdonald acted contrary to his public duty as a minister of the Crown.

The ICAC recommended that the matter be referred to the Director of Public Prosecutions with respect to prosecuting Obeid and others. On reviewing the evidence before the Commission of the financial benefits accrued to the Obeid family, the ICAC provided relevant information to the NSW Crime Commission for such action as it deems appropriate, and the ICAC also disseminated relevant information to the Australian Taxation Office for appropriate action. Further matters were also referred to the Australian Securities & Investments Commission, the Australian Securities Exchange and the Commonwealth Director of Public Prosecutions. In 2014 the Australian Competition & Consumer Commission commenced investigations of allegations of cartel conduct in relation to the 2009 tender process for the coal exploration licence. In 2013 the Australian Tax Office sent a bill totaling almost A$9 million in tax and penalties to more than thirty members of the Obeid family, including family matriarch Judith and most of the couple's children, sons and daughters-in-law and grandchildren.

In January 2014, the then Premier, Barry O'Farrell, announced that the Liberal/National government would introduce legislation into Parliament to cancel the exploration licences for Doyles Creek, Mount Penny and Glendon Brook.

In late May 2017, Obeid was committed to stand trial on conspiracy charges with Macdonald, relating to McDonald's granting of a coal exploration licence involving the Mount Penny tenement; due to commence in March 2019.

==== Operations Cyrus, Meeka and Cabot ====
In October 2013, the ICAC commenced further investigative hearings surrounding allegations that, between 2000 and 2011, Obeid misused his position as a Member of Parliament to attempt to influence public officials to exercise their official functions with respect to retail leases at Circular Quay, without disclosing that Obeid, his family or a related entity had an interest in some of those leases. It was also alleged that during the same period, certain public officials improperly exercised their official functions, with respect to retail leases at Circular Quay, to benefit Obeid or his family (Operation Cyrus). The ICAC also investigated allegations that, between 2005 and 2008, Obeid misused his position to attempt to influence other public officials to make decisions favouring Direct Health Solutions Pty Ltd., without disclosing that he, his family or a related entity had an interest in that company (Operation Meeka). Further, the ICAC also commenced investigations into allegations that, between 2007 and 2008, Obeid misused his position as a Member of Parliament to influence public officials to exercise their official functions with respect to the review and grant of water licences at a farm at Bylong in the Hunter Valley, without disclosing that he, his family or a related entity had an interest in the licences. It is also alleged that during the same period, certain public officials improperly exercised their official functions with respect to the review and grant of the water licences (Operation Cabot).

Former ministers, Carl Scully and Joe Tripodi were called before the ICAC; which handed down its findings in June 2014, recommending that the Director of Public Prosecutions (DPP) consider charging Obeid with misconduct in public office.

== Criminal charges and findings ==
Edward Moses Obeid
- Status: 1. Sentence completed 2. On parole
- Motive: Financial advantage
- Convictions: 1. Misconduct in public office (June 2016); 2. Conspiracy (July 2021)
- Penalty: 1. 5 years jail; (3 years non-parole period); 2. 7 years jail; (3 years, 10 months non-parole period)
- Accomplices: Ian Macdonald; Moses Obeid

Details
- Imprisoned at: 1. Silverwater Correctional Complex (2016–2019); 2. Cooma Correctional Centre (2021–2025 )

=== Misconduct in public office ===
In November 2014 the ICAC announced that following advice from the DPP, Obeid would be prosecuted for the offence of misconduct in public office for corruptly lobbying his former colleagues to gain lucrative concessions over cafe leases at Circular Quay that were secretly owned by his family. After a December hearing that refused to place Obeid under strict bail conditions, in February 2015 a Supreme Court judge ordered Obeid to surrender both his Australian and Lebanese passports, in the absence of an extradition treaty between Australian and Lebanon, as Obeid was considered a potential flight risk. In February 2016 a criminal trial against Obeid commenced in the NSW Supreme Court; however, as new evidence came to light, ten days into the trial the jury was discharged. In a subsequent criminal trial lasting just over three weeks, a jury found Obeid guilty of misconduct in public office. He was sentenced in December 2016 to five years in jail with a non-parole period of three years, and granted parole in 2019.

==== Appeal ====
In June 2017 before the NSW Court of Criminal Appeal, Obeid lodged an appeal against both his conviction and his sentence on the basis that he should not have stood trial in any court because breaches of the code of conduct governing NSW Members Parliament are within the exclusive cognisance or jurisdiction of Parliament, rather than the courts. On 13 September 2017 the NSW Court of Criminal Appeal, Bathurst CJ, Leeming JA, Hulme, Hamill and Adams JJ, dismissed the appeal against both his conviction and his sentence. The Court held that it would be an affront to the administration of justice for the Court to decline to exercise its jurisdiction and that it was inconceivable that a politician of sixteen years standing who had been a Minister for four years did not know that his duty was to serve the public interest and that he was not elected to use his position to advance his own or his family’s pecuniary interests. Obeid's legal team subsequently sought leave to lodge an appeal against his conviction with the High Court of Australia; claiming that the courts had no jurisdiction to hear a case about misconduct in public office and that jurisdiction rested with the NSW Parliament. Handing down its ruling on 22 March 2018, the High Court, before Bell, Keane and Edelman JJ, ruled there was insufficient possibility the appeal would succeed and leave was refused. In March 2026, it was reported that the NSW government has frozen approximately $AU30 million in assets from family trusts to properties owned by the Obeid family retroactively, from the past 10 years since 2016 to 2026 - especially Eddie Obeid and his son Mark Obeid the joint owner of the family trusts.

=== Criminal conspiracy ===
Further to Operations Cyrus, Meeka and Cabot, the DPP charged Obeid and his son, Moses, of conspiring over a coal exploration licence granted over the Obeid family farm in the Bylong Valley, when Ian Macdonald was Resources Minister from 2007 to 2009. Macdonald was separately charged with misconduct in public office. All three were tried before Justice Elizabeth Fullerton, and the trial commenced in early 2020 and concluded in February 2021. None of the accused gave evidence at their trial. Justice Fullerton handed down her verdict on 19 July, finding all three guilty. On 21 October 2021, Obeid was sentenced to seven years' jail, however was immediately released on bail due to concerns about the risk of Obeid contracting COVID. Macdonald and Moses Obeid were also given custodial sentences and did not apply for bail. Obeid, together with his son and Macdonald, lodged an appeal against their conviction, claiming that Justice Fullerton made a number of errors of fact and reasoning when she found them guilty. The appeal was dismissed by the NSW Court of Criminal Appeal in October 2023. Obeid served his sentence in Cooma Correctional Centre until released on parole on 20 August 2025.

== Post-political career ==
In late 2013, it was reported that Obeid and family were building a sandstone mansion in his ancestral home town of Matrit, Lebanon, due for completion in late 2014. In 2013, Obeid and his wife listed for sale their family home, Passy, in Hunters Hill, with an initial asking price of A$10 million. In 2020, it was reported that Passy sold for approximately A$11 million. In 2013, Obeid also made application for fee assistance from the New South Wales government to assist with legal costs. In May 2017, the NSW Parliament passed legislation to remove parliamentary pensions from former politicians convicted of serious criminal offences. As of July 2020, the NSW Government was trying to recover approximately A$7.9 million from Obeid and three of his sons for their failed lawsuits against the ICAC and its officers.

== Awards and honours ==
In 1984 Obeid was awarded a Medal of the Order of Australia for his services to ethnic welfare; which was cancelled by the Governor-General in 2014.

As a state minister and Member of the Legislative Council, Obeid was entitled to use the honorific "The Honourable" for life. Following findings of corrupt conduct against Obeid and the announcement of the decision to commence criminal proceedings, at the request of Mike Baird, the Premier of New South Wales, the Department of Premier and Cabinet asked Obeid to show cause why he should not lose the honorific. Although Obeid argued for its retention, Baird recommended to Governor David Hurley that the honorific be removed; which was authorised with effect from December 2014.

Political offices
Preceded by Bob Martin	Minister for Fisheries; 1999–2003	Succeeded by Ian Macdonald as Minister for Agriculture and Fisheries
Preceded by Bob Martin	Minister for Mineral Resources; 1999–2003	Succeeded by Kerry Hickey
