= Ron Medich =

Australian property developer (born 1948)

- Born: Ronald Edward Medich; 11 April 1948 (age 78); Innisfail, Queensland, Australia
- Education: St Joseph's College, Hunters Hill
- Status: Incarcerated
- Criminal charges: Murder and intimidation
- Penalty: 39 years in custody; with a non-parole period of 30 years
- Accomplices: Fortunato "Lucky" Gattellari (soliciting the murder of McGurk and being an accessory after the fact); Senad Kaminic (an accessory before and after the fact); Haissam Safetli (murder of McGurk); Christopher Estephan (murder of McGurk)

Details
- Victims: Michael McGurk
- Date: 3 September 2009; 18:30–18:45

Ronald Edward Medich (born 11 April 1948) is an Australian property developer who was found guilty in the Supreme Court of New South Wales of ordering the 2009 contract murder of Scottish Australian businessman Michael McGurk, and the subsequent intimidation of McGurk's wife, Kimberly. Medich is currently serving a 39-year sentence. The earliest date he will be eligible for parole is 26 February 2048.

== Biography ==
Medich was born in 1948 in Innisfail, Queensland to a Croatian-born immigrant. Medich's father worked as a canecutter, before moving to Cabramatta, Sydney and commenced developing land in Sydney's south-west. Educated at St Joseph's College, Hunters Hill, Medich and his younger brother, Roy, developed industrial and residential sites in the Liverpool area; including the El Toro Hotel, Liverpool, the Stardust Hotel, Cabramatta, and the Greenfield Tavern Hotel. According to the BRW Rich 200, the Medich brothers' estimated net worth was $135 million in May 2005 and included property investments in south-western Sydney, Leichhardt, the Hunter Valley and Melbourne. Following the 2007 sale of their Leichhardt investment property, Ron and Roy Medich split their business interests.

In November 2011 the Independent Commission Against Corruption (ICAC) commenced an inquiry that heard allegations that Ian Macdonald, while a Minister in the Government of New South Wales, accepted sexual favours in return for introducing businessmen to executives of state-owned energy companies. It was also alleged that Ron Medich acted as a broker for Macdonald and was seeking to do business with government agencies where Macdonald had influence as a Minister. Appearing before the commission to give evidence in relation to the allegations, Macdonald claimed that he was under the influence of alcohol and suffering the effects of depression at the time of the alleged incident.

=== Connection with McGurk ===
Medich and McGurk had a series of significant and ongoing business interests. In various media reports, it was claimed that Medich and McGurk were in dispute, including matters that were brought before the Federal Court by Medich against McGurk and his wife, and various companies associated with McGurk. These matters were heard by the Court and dismissed on 8 April 2009, due to Medich failing to disclose material facts. Costs were awarded against Medich. In another matter, currently awaiting resolution, Medich and the Executors of McGurk's estate are in dispute. The matter has been stood over, for the present.

Michael McGurk was shot by a single gunshot to his head some time between 6:30 pm and 6:45 pm on 3 September 2009 outside his family home in Cremorne. McGurk lived in the house with his wife, Kimberley, and their four children and were reportedly "... a Catholic family, a lovely family". According to friends and McGurk's priest, he was a generous man and doting father. McGurk's nine-year-old son, Luc, was with him at the time of the shooting and is reported to have been a witness to the murder. Emergency services were called to the murder scene and rendered assistance to McGurk; however he could not be saved and died at the scene of the shooting.

Within days of McGurk's death, it was revealed that McGurk had a tape recording of a conversation with Medich, which McGurk was allegedly using to try to extort money from Medich. It was alleged that Medich was attempting to influence government officials by improper means. It was reported that Medich sought planning approval to rezone land that he owned at Badgerys Creek on the south-western fringes of Sydney. There was immense and, what some described as, sensational media coverage about these tapes, their content, and possible ramifications. On 5 September 2009 the Sydney Morning Herald ran with a front-page banner: "Exclusive: Secret tape blamed for killing" and, directly below the banner: "It could bring down the Government."

On 6 September 2009, Graham Richardson, a former senior Government minister in the Hawke and Keating Labor governments and now political lobbyist, told Channel Nine that he had heard the tape and the key part which apparently exposes the Labor figures was inaudible. Richardson went on to say that McGurk was allegedly trying to blackmail Medich for $8 million and that Richardson had provided a formal statement to New South Wales Police in around June 2009. Commenting on Richardson's very public denial of the tapes containing any matter of substance, Jennifer Hewett, national affairs columnist with The Australian, wrote:

The very notion that Richardson – a man normally desperate to avoid contributing to his media profile these days – is so determined to publicly dismiss the significance of the tape should set off plenty of alarms.

On 8 September 2009, NSW Police passed a copy of the tape to ICAC. However, on 9 September 2009, a motion was carried in the Legislative Council to establish an inquiry into Badgerys Creek land dealings and planning decisions. The inquiry's terms of reference included inquiring into and "report on land dealings and planning decisions relating to land or interests in land held solely or jointly by Ron Medich Properties Pty Ltd and Roy Medich Properties Pty Ltd in or around Badgerys Creek", with a particular focus on roles of the Minister for Planning, other ministers, NSW Planning, other government agencies, members of parliament, political parties and lobbyists, and to make recommendations about planning integrity. Fourteen submissions were received, including submissions from Richardson, NSW Planning (via Sam Haddad), the Property Council of Australia, and Penrith City Council. Public hearings were held on:

- 29 September 2009 – appearing were Haddad and other NSW Planning officials, Kristina Keneally in her capacity as Minister for Planning, and both Roy and Ron Medich;
- 19 October 2009 – appearing were Frank Sartor, in his capacity as a former Minister for Planning, Richardson, and Haddad and other NSW Planning officials; and
- 14 December 2009 – Richardson again appeared.

An interim report was tabled to Parliament on 20 November 2009, and made eleven recommendations with a focus on stronger regulation of contact between planning officials, development proponents and lobbyists. The committee also recommended tighter regulation of political donations. The supplementary report was tabled on 25 February 2010 and only became necessary as a result of Richardson's unwillingness to respond in writing to questions submitted after his evidence at the committee's first hearing.

Meanwhile, based on information in the recording plus media reports and information provided by an inmate in a correction centre, ICAC identified 13 matters for investigation. A public enquiry was held over five days, and commenced on 1 February 2010. Medich, Haddad, and Richardson all gave evidence at the ICAC Inquiry. The Commissioner determined that there were no findings of corrupt conduct; and was unable to substantiate any of the 13 allegations.

==== Arrests ====
On 13 October 2010, 13 months after the murder of McGurk, homicide detectives arrested the following:

- Fortunato "Lucky" Gattellari (60), a former Australian featherweight boxing champion and brother of Rocky Gattellari – charged with soliciting the murder of McGurk and being an accessory after the fact
- Senad Kaminic (42), a former Bosnian soldier and business associate of Gattellari – charged with being an accessory before and after the fact
- Haissam Safetli (45) – charged with murder of McGurk
- Christopher Estephan (20) – charged with murder of McGurk

It was reported that four days after the murder of McGurk, police seized a number of weapons from Gattellari's home. Media reports claim that Gattellari was appointed a director to a number of companies associated with Medich in July 2009. Court documents lodged by police, allege that some time after 1 May 2009, Gattellari solicited Safetli to murder McGurk and that for more than 13 months after the killing "did receive, harbour, maintain, and assist" Safetli. Medich, who has reportedly known Gattellari from childhood, had lent millions to Gattellari, including $4.8 million between November 2009 and October 2010 and $16 million in total, through various joint ventures.

On 27 October 2010, police also arrested Medich and charged him with soliciting to murder McGurk. Police alleged that Medich was the mastermind of the murder plot. Medich was arrested at his solicitor's office and it was reported that Gattellari had agreed to give evidence against Medich, in defence of his own conspiracy charges. It was also reported that Safetli was prepared to give evidence against Medich. Despite Medich offering to put up $1 million in surety, and his younger brother Roy Medich offering $500,000 in cash, bail was refused. A few days later, Medich was charged with murder of Michael McGurk. Much media attention was given to Medich's fall from grace, because he spent a little under two months in solitary confinement whilst in custody, before being released on conditional bail. In a 2013 committal hearing, Medich pleaded not guilty to the murder of McGurk, and pleaded not guilty to a charge of intimidation in relation to McGurk's wife, Kim. A trial date of August 2014 was set, before Justice Megan Latham.

==== Convictions and sentencing ====
After pleading guilty in the NSW Supreme Court, Gattellari was sentenced by Justice Megan Latham in April 2013 to a maximum of 10 years jail. He is currently serving a sentence reduced by sixty per cent after agreeing to testify against Medich and others on behalf of the Crown. He was eligible for parole on 13 April 2018 but, after the NSW Parole Board refused parole, Gattellari lodged an appeal against the decision. Gattellari is facing further charges, together with Roger Rogerson and Glen McNamara, for allegedly attempting to extort Medich.

Kaminic, who pleaded guilty, was sentenced in April 2013 to a minimum two and a half years in jail and a maximum of four and a half, being eligible for parole in November 2017.

Estephan pleaded not guilty and was tried for murder. After a jury found him guilty, he was sentenced in April 2013 by Justice Geoffrey Bellew to a maximum of six years and five months' jail, with a minimum non-parole period of five years. Estephan was eligible for parole on 12 October 2015.

In August 2013, Safetli pleaded guilty and was sentenced to six and a half years' jail for the murder of McGurk, and another six months for intimidating McGurk's widow.

After a jury failed to reach a verdict in a 2017 trial, Medich was again tried before a Supreme Court jury and, on 23 April 2018, was found guilty of ordering the murder of McGurk, and of intimidating McGurk's wife, Kimberley. Medich had earlier plead not guilty to both charges. On 21 June 2018 in the Supreme Court, Medich was sentenced to a custodial sentence of 39 years, with a minimum non-parole period of 30 years.

== Personal life ==
Medich is married to Odetta, a Lithuanian-born taxation lawyer and arts benefactor, and together they have six children. In 2017 it was reported Medich and his wife are estranged.

In 1990, Medich built a home in Denham Court, which he and his wife sold for $3.4 million in 2003. They relocated to Point Piper.
