= Operation Savoy =

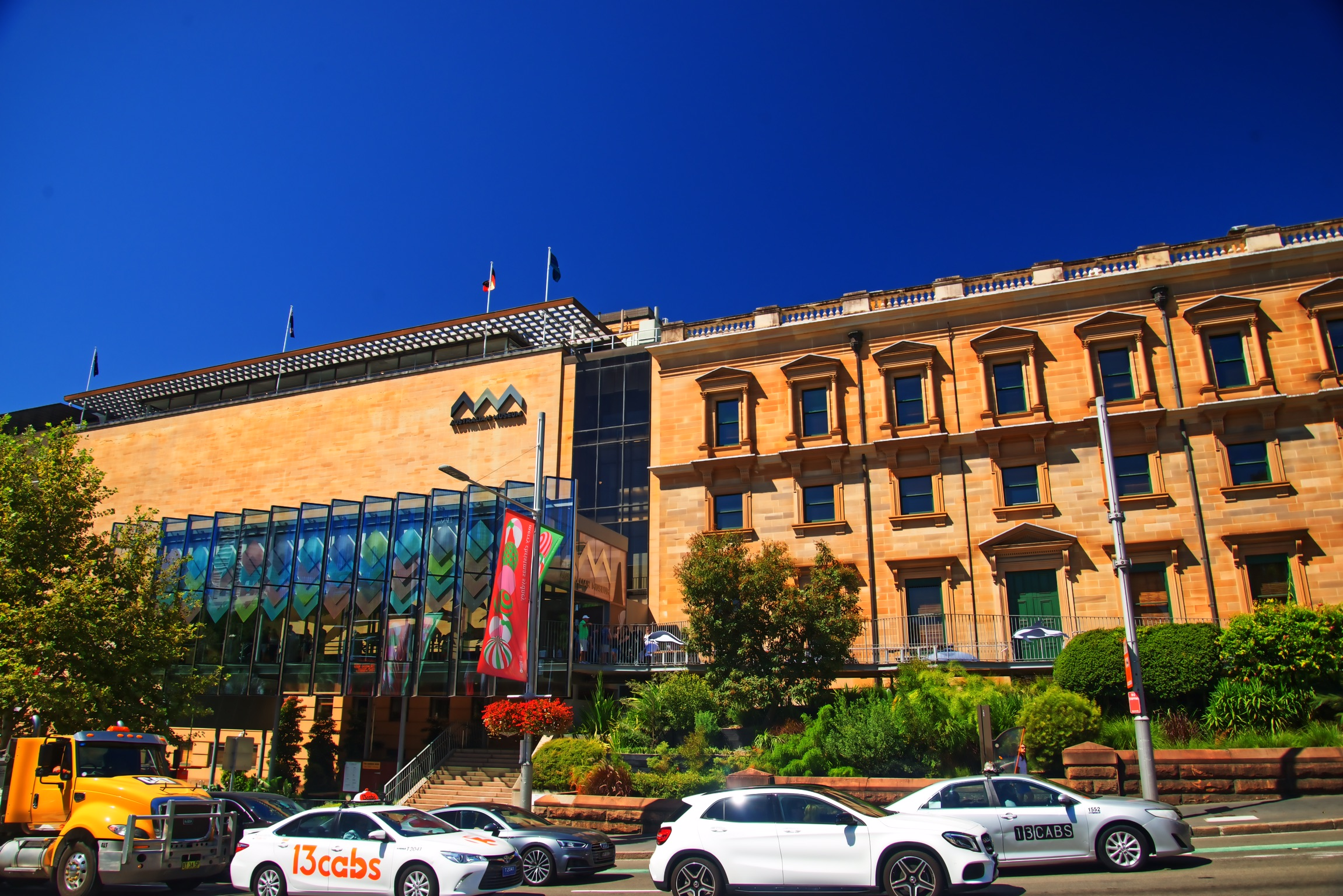
- Australian Museum, College Street site
- Venue: Australian Museum
- Location: Sydney, New South Wales, Australia
- Type: Theft of over 2,000 zoological specimens from the Australian Museum
- Inquiries: Independent Commission Against Corruption (ICAC) investigation
- Convicted: Hendrikus ‘Hank’ van Leeuwen
- Convictions: Theft; larceny as a servant; disposing of public property (April 2007)
- Sentence: 7 years custodial; 5 years non-parole period

Operation Savoy was an Independent Commission Against Corruption (ICAC) investigation into thefts of zoological specimens from the Australian Museum by Hendrikus ‘Hank’ van Leeuwen. The investigation initiated in September 2002 and spanned for five months. The investigation resulted in the retrieval of over 2000 items van Leeuwen had stolen from the Museum, which was 'the largest theft of Museum holdings ever perpetrated in Australia'.

The commission made findings of corruption against van Leeuwen, which resulted in criminal charges. He was sentenced to 7 years in prison on 20 April 2007, with a non-parole period of five years. At the time, this was the longest jail term that came as a result of an ICAC investigation.

The Museum also made institutional changes, on the recommendation of the commission, to prevent such events from happening again in the future.

== Background ==
Hank van Leeuwen became interested in collection and taxidermy of animals as a child in the Netherlands. He moved with his wife and two children to Australia in 1981.

He was employed in a temporary role as an Assistant Conservator at the Australian Museum by David Horton-James, the head of Material Conservation at the Museum, on the 2 December 1996. In the role van Leeuwen was primarily a pest controller, managing insects that could potentially damage collection items. This role gave him unrestricted and unsupervised access to all of the Museum's 13 million zoological specimens, across its main College Street location and its external storage facility at Marrickville. He was also granted similar access to Museum vehicles, in order to transport himself and the pest control equipment between sites.

Van Leeuwen began stealing items 3 to 4 months into his role. In early 1997, Museum staff started reporting that zoological specimens had started going missing. The Museum believed these disappearances to be the result of thefts, with van Leeuwen being a primary suspect. Museum management decided against an active internal investigation, concerned such a move would contravene government harassment policy without more definitive evidence. In 1998, Museum management informed the police of the missing specimens, however, the police ‘found no evidence against van Leeuwen’ and ‘were unable to establish if in fact items had been stolen’. On the recommendation of the police, the Museum upgraded and increased security, over the course of 1998 to 1999, however, this had little impact in reducing van Leeuwen's thefts.

After van Leeuwen impressed Professor Michael Archer, the Museum's director, with his casting skills, he was moved to the palaeontology division as a moulder and caster on the 16 October 1999. This limited his work to a small space at the Museum's College Street site and resulted in him losing his unrestricted access to the Museum's zoological specimens. While his stealing continued, his thefts became more opportunistic.

An inventory was conducted in February 2002 of the Museum's CITES material, which noted 339 mammals, 32 reptiles and between 32 and 46 fish specimens were missing.

== Investigation ==
In late September 2002, the Museum Trust called ICAC about the matter. On the 3 October 2002, officers of the Museum formally reported the matter in a meeting with staff from the commission. After an initial assessment, the commission had ‘strong indicators that an insider, Hank van Leeuwen’ was committing the thefts.

Since van Leeuwen was employed by the Australian Museum, during the period of the thefts, he was considered a public official under the ICAC Act. Theft of a public institution's property by a public official constituted ‘the dishonest exercise of official functions’, a form of corrupt conduct under the ICAC Act. Due to this, the Commission decided to handle the investigation themselves, rather than referring the matter onto the police. The commission also believed there were other issues at the Museum which allowed the thefts to occur over such long period and these also needed to be examined.

The commission launched the investigation by first collating information about all the specimens that had gone missing, then they set up ‘covert surveillance’ of the Museum's collections. ICAC operatives observed van Leeuwen moving specimens from his house to his daughter's house on the 11 March 2003, so that he could hide them. After applications by Commissioner Irene Moss, search warrants of van Leeuwen's Londonderry home and separate properties in Newcastle and the South Coast were granted. On the 12, 13 and 17 March 2003, the commission, assisted by the police, searched van Leeuwen's property and the properties of his associates and family. These searches retrieved more than two thousand zoological specimens as well as scientific tools, books and office equipment from the Museum.

=== Hearings ===
Subsequently, Commissioner Moss authorised the conduct of private hearings, which allowed the commission to compel individuals to give evidence under oath. This was mainly to explore why the attempts and methods the Museum used to combat the thefts ended up being largely ineffective.

In the commission's interviews with van Leeuwen, he ‘admitted to taking Museum property without the Museum’s authorisation or consent’, using Museum vehicles to transport stolen items back to his home. On every monthly pest inspection of the Marrickville storage site he would take ‘as many skulls as the four wheel drive rear compartment would contain’. At the Museum's College Street site, he admitted to taking reptile specimens from the Museum Spirit House and other specimens from the separate collection areas for mammals and birds. His method for removing these items was to place 3 or 4 specimens in a box, transport them to the freezer room, from where he would take them home.

Van Leeuwen stated the thefts were motivated by his personal interests in maintaining his own collections, and during his interviews, noted that there ‘was no monetary gain in ‘em’ for himself. However, he also admitted to producing a casting of one of the crocodile skull specimens and selling a mould from the cast for $900 on the online osteology reproductions business, Eternal Preservation. The commission also found a business plan for a private natural sciences museum which van Leeuwen had intentions of starting, which would have involved displaying items he had taken from the Museum.

=== Findings ===
Commissioner Moss found that van Leeuwen ‘intended to permanently deprive’ the Museum of the stolen collection items and his primary goal was to use the stolen specimens for his commercial benefit. She found he had performed a dishonest exercise of his official function under section 8(1)(c) of the ICAC Act, and his actions constituted larceny as a servant under Crimes Act 1900 (NSW). She also determined that these were ‘reasonable grounds for dismissing van Leeuwen’ from the Australian Museum. Commissioner Moss also recommended that van Leeuwen and his associates be considered for prosecution by the Director of Public Prosecutions.

It was also found that Professor Archer did not undertake his legal obligation, as director, of informing ICAC about the thefts when he became aware of them. However, he contended that he did not know about these requirements, and after the Museum had a better idea of the extent of the losses, he intended to approach the police again about the matter.

== Court case ==
Van Leeuwen was listed for trial for the 19 February 2007. On the 11 August 2006 he pleaded guilty to 15 counts of stealing from his employer and acknowledged a further 179 counts of both larceny as a servant and disposing of stolen property charges. Prosecutors estimated the value of all the items which he stole to be $873,250 (AUD).

The facts of a further 199 counts of larceny as a servant and 36 charges of disposing of goods could not be agreed on between prosecutors and van Leeuwen's lawyers, so the matter went before Judge Peter Berman as a disputed facts hearing in the District Court at Sydney. Judge Berman affirmed the evidence given by staff at the Museum against van Leeuwen over van Leeuwen's testimony, finding he had lied under oath multiple times, stating that even his lawyer, Clive Steirn, admitted that van Leeuwen had lied.

Van Leeuwen stated that he ‘experienced jealousy and antipathy’ from other staff at the Museum, which made him feel ostracised, however, Judge Berman found such feelings from the staff were justified since they suspected he was the one stealing from the Museum. His lawyer also claimed that the Museum was keeping some of van Leeuwen's own collection to mitigate their losses from his thefts. Judge Berman found no evidence for this claim and stated although some of van Leeuwen's collection was being stored at the Australian Museum, this material was under the supervision of ICAC, and was being kept at that moment as evidence for his prosecution.

Judge Berman found that van Leeuwen's actions caused both economic harm, in the form of time and resources taken by Museum staff in their maintenance of the damage he caused to Museum specimens, and non-economic damage in form of depleting the scientific value of specimens he stole by damaging them. Judge Berman also found he caused reputational damage to the Museum. A submission by Paul Clark, a Development Manager at the Museum, stated that this brand damage had reduced the public trust in the Museum and had made it more difficult to develop new income streams for the Museum.

Judge Berman found that van Leeuwen had taken these items simply because he wanted them but he did not find he took the items to advance his own commercial interests.

On 20 April 2007, van Leeuwen was sentenced to seven years of jail with a non-parole period of five years, making him eligible for release on the 19 April 2012.

=== Damage to specimens ===
The Crown found that van Leeuwen's theft had caused damage to the stolen specimens in the following ways:

- The removal of teeth from a thylacine skull. Van Leeuwen claimed the teeth were in a paper bag when he stole them, however, the judge found he probably accidentally removed them when making a cast of the skull
- Pest infestation of the material while they were in van Leeuwen's possession
- Disassociation of items from their registration numbers (numbers which indicate scientific data like where the item was collected), to prevent tracing these items back to the Museum
  - 32 mammal specimens, including five marsupial moles, having irreparable damage as they could no longer be matched with their registered numbers
  - Erasure of registered numbers from the skulls of wallabies and kangaroos, through scratching
  - Replacing bird specimen registration numbers with his own system of registered numbers
- Bleaching bones in order to make them more attractive to display, making them more fragile and reducing their longevity
- Changing the shape of skin specimens by packing them too tightly
- Macerating items due to poor quality storage in insufficient ethanol
- Separating the skull of a Ganges River Dolphin from the skeleton and storing them in different locations

Van Leeuwen contested all of these findings during the hearing. He stated he had observed ICAC officers overloading cardboard boxes during their raids which could have led to the damage of the specimens. Judge Berman stated that even if this was true that van Leeuwen did not directly cause the damage to the specimens, his act of stealing such a large volume of items which necessitated recovery by police officers, untrained in handling natural history specimens, made him responsible for the potential damage caused.

He also countered that the Museum was at fault for being unable to repatriate items with their registration numbers due not having ‘measured, photographed, and otherwise recorded identifying information of items either at the time they were received, or subsequently’. The Museum was able to reassociate some specimens with their tags due to measurements of some of the items being taken when they were previously studied, and were able to cross-reference bird specimens with the identification system van Leeuwen had developed for ornithological objects he had taken. Van Leeuwen also offered to aid Museum staff in reassociating specimens with their registration numbers.

== Aftermath ==
Shortly after van Leeuwen was arrested, his employment at the Australian Museum was terminated in late March 2003. Professor Archer also left the Museum, to become the Dean of the Faculty of Science at UNSW, on the back of criticism from ICAC for how the Museum management handled the thefts and after the directorship was readvertised in 2003 after a restructuring at the Museum.

=== ICAC Recommendations ===
The commission made several recommendations to improve operations at the Museum and prevent future thefts from occurring. The recommendations covered the following areas:

==== Staff ====
- Using a merit selection process to employ staff
- Undertake referee checks on all prospective hires
- All staff and volunteers have training to prevent corruption
- All staff have awareness training in collection security
- Staff receive regular information through newsletters, staff meetings and other internal communication channels about corruption prevention policies and procedures, codes of conduct and conflict of interest procedures
- All staff have a direct supervisor monitoring their work
- The Museum amend the code covering the receival of gifts and benefits by staff from external parties

==== Security ====
- No specimen could be removed from the Museum without written authority
- Security guards should have the authority to stop anyone moving specimens off premises
- The Museum investigate the use of electronic tagging of collection items
- Introduction of random bag checks
- Individuals visiting the collections or storage areas must have prior approval or visitors passes that must be visible at all times
- The Museum develops an internal investigation policy which assigns resources and responsibilities for conducting internal investigations

==== Collection management ====
- The Mailroom ensure ingoing and outgoing mail is secure, by keeping records of all mail and its contents
- The Museum amend reporting requirements for assistant directors to advise Directors about missing specimens as soon as possible, rather than when a certain value threshold of missing items is reached
- All specimens be recorded in an electronic database
- Each specimen be given a dedicated space within the Museum which should also be recorded in an electronic database
- The Museum use an electronic database to record the movement of specimens
- Collection Managers set aside one day a year to conduct a sample stocktake
- The Museum maintain a loan database

=== Review of Implementation ===
The Office of the Auditor-General of New South Wales audited the Australian Museum's practices of knowing the whereabouts of their collection items in 2009. Although the Museum had stated they had implemented an online database of their specimens in 2005, as per the ICAC recommendation, the audit found that staff continued to use a mix of electronic databases and paper records to find items, with different collection having varying degrees of record digitisation.
