= Chris Flannery =

Chris Flannery may refer to:

- Chris Flannery (rugby league) (born 1980), Australian rugby league player
- Christopher Dale Flannery (1948–1985), Australian hitman
