= Blue Murder: Killer Cop =

2017 Australian miniseries

- DVD cover
- Genre: Drama
- Written by: Peter Schreck
- Directed by: Michael Jenkins
- Starring: Richard Roxburgh; Dan Wyllie; Toni Collette; Matt Nable; Emma Booth; Aaron Pedersen; Toby Schmitz; Justin Smith; Steve Le Marquand; Peter Phelps; Andrew Ryan; Damian Walshe-Howling; Robert Mammone; Aaron Jeffery; Tony Martin
- Narrated by: Richard Roxburgh
- Country of origin: Australia
- Original language: English
- No. of episodes: 2

Production
- Executive producers: Richard Roxburgh; Julie McGauran
- Producers: John Edwards; Michael Jenkins; Carol Hughes
- Running time: 105 - 120 minutes (including ads)
- Production company: Endemol Shine Australia

Original release
- Network: Seven Network
- Release: 6 August – 7 August 2017

Related
- Blue Murder

Blue Murder: Killer Cop is a two-part Australian television miniseries based on true events, produced by the Seven Network and premiered on 6 August 2017. It is a sequel to the miniseries Blue Murder which screened in 1995 on the ABC. Set in the 1990s, 2000s and 2010s in Sydney, the miniseries continues the story of the life of former Detective Roger "the Dodger" Rogerson. The series is directed by Michael Jenkins and produced by John Edwards for Endemol Shine.

== Synopsis ==
The series follows Roger Rogerson, post Blue Murder (1995), showing how he met his wife Anne and the murder of Jamie Gao that led to his arrest and murder conviction.

== Cast ==
- Richard Roxburgh as Roger Rogerson
- Dan Wyllie as Michael Hurley
- Toni Collette as Anne Melocco
- Matt Nable as Detective Mark Standen
- Emma Booth as Detective Julie Wienthall
- Aaron Pedersen as Detective Joe Kenshell
- Toby Schmitz as Internal Affairs Detective Jed Wilson
- Justin Smith as Glen McNamara
- Steve Le Marquand as Detective Larry Churchill
- Lee Shaw as Les Mara
- Peter Phelps as Graham 'Abo' Henry
- Andrew Ryan as Wayne Crofton
- Damian Walshe-Howling as Alan Abrahams
- Robert Mammone as James Kinch
- Aaron Jeffery as Chris Bronowski
- Michael Denkha as Bill Jalalaty
- Tony Martin as Arthur "Neddy" Smith
- Michael Tran as Jamie Gao
- Mark Ferguson (stock footage)
- Jack Kelly as Robert 'Dolly' Dunn

== Reception ==
=== Viewership ===
The first part of the mini-series achieved a metro ratings audience of 717,000, coming second in its timeslot behind 60 Minutes and ranking seventh of the night.

The second part of the mini-series dropped 200,000 viewers and achieved a metro ratings audience of 516,000, coming third in its timeslot behind This Time Next Year and Have You Been Paying Attention? respectively and ranking 20th of the night.

No.	Title	Air date	Timeslot	Overnight ratings		Consolidated ratings		Total viewers	Ref(s)
No.	Title	Air date	Timeslot	Viewers	Rank	Viewers	Rank	Total viewers	Ref(s)
1	Part 1	6 August 2017	Sunday 8:30pm	717,000	7	185,000	4	902,000	
2	Part 2	7 August 2017	Monday 8:45pm	516,000	20	148,000	15	664,000	

=== Reviews ===
The series has received positive reviews, Denise Eriksen, journalist for The New Daily said "This is a brilliantly written, layered drama, it weaves together many stories of flawed-yet-interesting men into a seamless narrative and features some of Australia’s best actors."

Bridget McManus, writer for The Sydney Morning Herald gave the series 4 out of 5 stars, praising Richard Roxburgh and Toni Collette for their roles in the series saying "Richard Roxburgh slips so effortlessly back into the role, whilst Toni Collette is superb as she nails the strident Sydney accent and strangely sensual frump of the printing shop worker whose heart Rogerson stole".

David Knox, writer for TV Tonight also gave the series 4 out of 5 stars saying "The sequel stands up well, thanks to retaining its links with director Michael Jenkins and Roxburgh. It does adhere to the true crime bio-pic path than look more broadly at an era in NSW law & order, with its leading man promoted to anti-hero".

=== Accolades ===
Award	Category	Subject	Result
AACTA Awards (7th)	Best Telefeature or Mini Series	Carol Hughes	Nominated
AACTA Awards (7th)	Best Telefeature or Mini Series	Michael Jenkins	Nominated
AACTA Awards (7th)	Best Lead Actor in a Television Drama	Richard Roxburgh	Nominated
AACTA Awards (7th)	Best Lead Actress in a Television Drama	Toni Collette	Nominated
AACTA Awards (7th)	Best Guest or Supporting Actor in a Television Drama	Matt Nable	Nominated
AACTA Awards (7th)	Best Guest or Supporting Actress in a Television Drama	Emma Booth	Nominated
AACTA Awards (7th)	Best Cinematography in Television	Bruce Young	Nominated
AACTA Awards (7th)	Best Editing in Television	Bill Russo	Nominated
AACTA Awards (7th)	Best Original Music Score in Television	John Gray	Nominated
AACTA Awards (7th)	Best Production Design in Television	Murray Picknett	Nominated
AACTA Awards (7th)	Best Costume Design in Television	Damir Peranovic	Won
AACTA Awards (7th)	Best Hair and Makeup	Nikki Gooley	Nominated
AACTA Awards (7th)	Best Hair and Makeup	Sheldon Wade	Nominated
