= The Connaught (Sydney) =

Apartment building in Sydney, Australia

Coordinates: 33.877422°S 151.209716°E

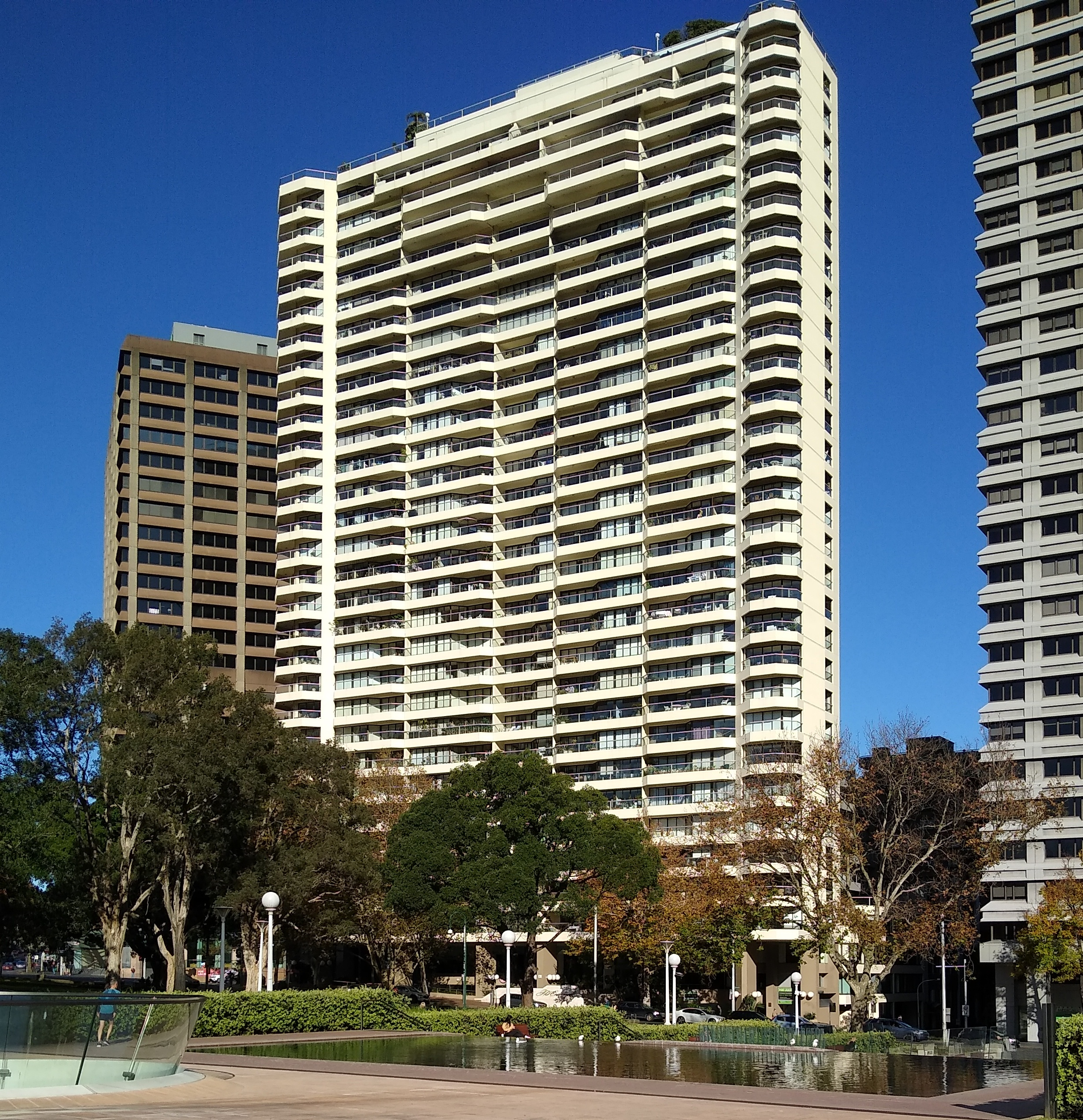
The Connaught

The Connaught is a landmark residential apartment building in Sydney, Australia overlooking Hyde Park. It is known for being one of the first high-rise strata apartment buildings in Sydney and for its string of famous residents.

== History ==
The site where The Connaught stands today was originally the site of the Paris Theatre designed by architect Walter Burley Griffin, and demolished in 1981. The thirty-storey Connaught was completed in 1984 by Civil & Civic, builders of the Sydney Opera House, and was named in honour of the Duke of Connaught, Prince Arthur, third son of Queen Victoria and former Governor-General of Canada.

== Notable residents ==
The Connaught has been home to many famous and infamous residents over its thirty-year history. Notable residents have included singers Michael Hutchence and Kylie Minogue, reporter Jana Wendt, film critic Margaret Pomeranz, showbusiness veteran Barry Crocker, reporter Richard Wilkins, infamous criminal Christopher Dale Flannery, lawyer and socialite Chris Murphy and businessman Max Moore-Wilton. In 1995 Tony Byrne was a resident in The Connaught when his model daughter Caroline Byrne was found dead at the bottom of the notorious 'The Gap'. The mistress of the late Richard Pratt, Shari-Lea Hitchcock, was also a resident of The Connaught.

== Crime ==
In 2010 The Connaught was the scene of the high-profile murder of an elderly resident (Ching Yung Tang) allegedly by his 92-year-old wife (Clara Tang), who at the time was the oldest woman in Australian to be put on trial for murder.
