= Ray Mooney =

Australian playwright and author (born 1945)

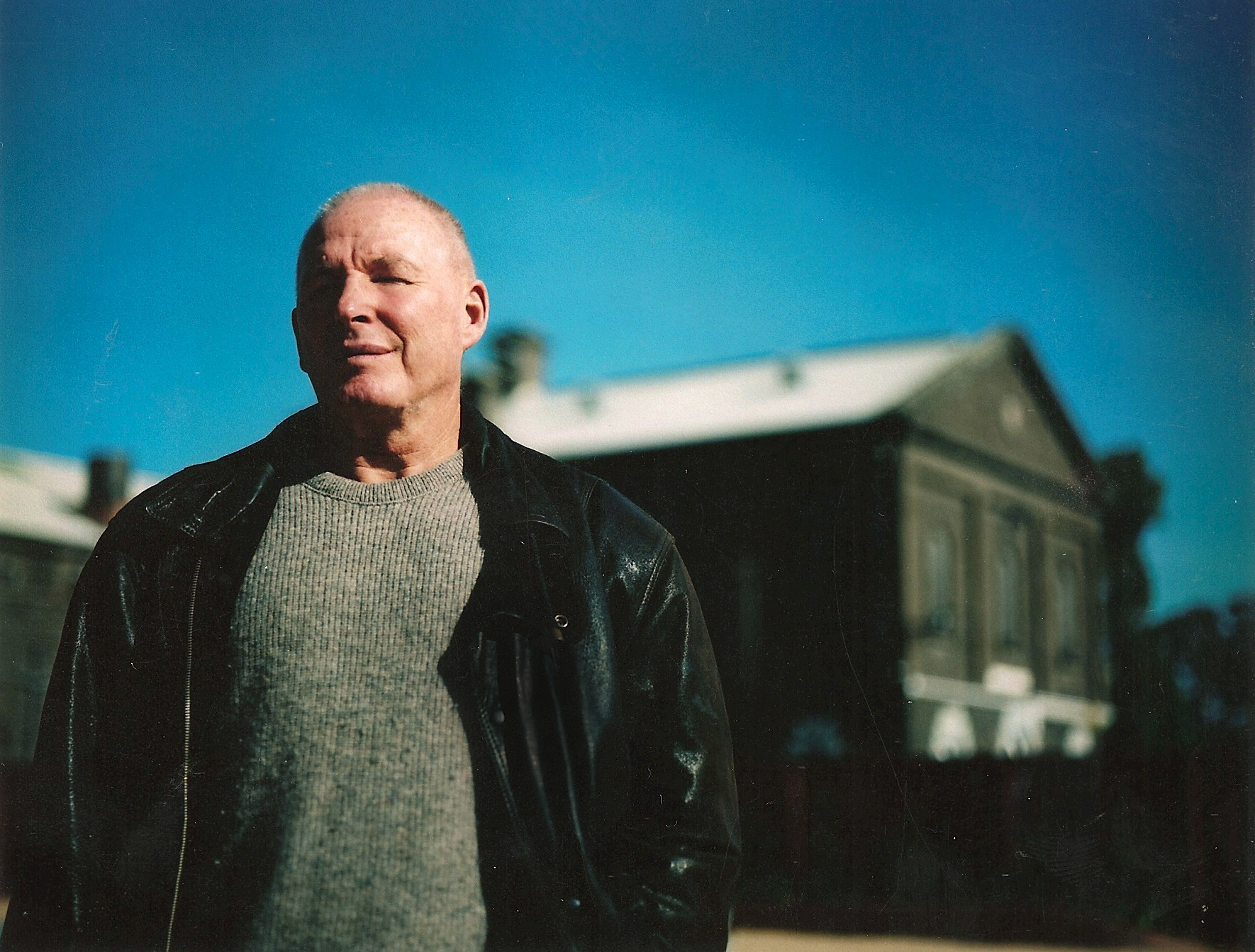
Ray Mooney beside B Division. Pentridge

Raymond Kevin Mooney (born 1945 in Melbourne) is an Australian novelist, playwright and screenwriter. Regarded as an important crime writer his plays have been produced in Australian theatres.

In 1968 Mooney was sentenced to 12 years for rape and assault and was sent to HM Prison Pentridge. While in prison, he befriended cell mate Christopher Dale Flannery, who was accused of being a prolific contract killer known as "Mr Rent-a-kill". Mooney became the first prisoner in Australia to complete a university degree while still in jail. Upon his release in 1975, he studied drama at the Victorian College of the Arts and formed two theatre companies: Governor’s Pleasure, a theatre company of ex-prisoners and ZAP Community Theatre.

Mooney wrote the play Everynight Everynight based on his experiences in Pentridge Prison. A film adaptation of the play was made in 1994 and was nominated for an AFI Award for Best Adapted Screenplay.

Mooney has lectured at tertiary institutions, including Holmesglen TAFE and the VCA Film and Television School.

== Rape ==
In 1968, some months after separating from his wife, Mooney lured a 16 year old girl into his car. When she screamed and tried to escape, he punched her in the face, breaking her nose. He then raped her and a short time later, raped her a second time. Mooney was convicted of one count of assault occasioning actual bodily harm, and two counts of rape. At sentencing, he was supported by a Catholic Priest, Father Kevin Toomey. Mooney was sentenced to 12 years gaol with a minimum of 9 years and was sent to HM Prison Pentridge.

== Other works ==
- In 2011 Mooney co-authored A Pack of Bloody Animals, a book about the Walsh Street police shootings.
- A Green Light – The Kingdom of Children (eNovel)
- A Green Light – The Kingdom of Men (eNovel)
- A Green Light – The Kingdom (eNovel)
- The Ethics Of Evil – Stories Of H Division (Non-Fiction, ebook)
- Mouth Of The Dog – An Attack On Snitches, Verballers and Informers (Non-Fiction, ebook)
- Gangsters With Badges: The Truth about Melbourne's Walsh St Murders
