= Eman Sharobeem =

Egyptian-Australian woman

Eman Sharobeem is an Egyptian-Australian woman who was known as a women's rights activist and nominated as an Australian of the Year finalist in 2015. She was active in the Western Sydney suburbs of Fairfield and Cabramatta focusing on services for women in minority communities, including advocacy to prevent honour killings and freeing girls from forced marriages. In 2018, the Independent Commission Against Corruption, an independent corruption commission, ruled that Sharobeem had stolen over $750,000 from the charities she managed and had falsified her qualifications. Prior to the ICAC investigation, Sharobeem was commended for her activism and appointed to various government advisory boards.

== Activism ==
Sharobeem's activism focuses on the areas of women's health and underage marriages. According to Sharobeem, a small number of child bride cases exist in Australia today. Ms Sharobeem's activism was underlined by her personal story of being forced into an arranged marriage at 15-years-old and living through years of domestic abuse before becoming a widow at age 29, however, during the 2017 corruption case against her, the claim Sharobeem was a child bride was discovered to be false.

Sharobeem was appointed as a member of the NSW Anti-Discrimination Board, the Community Relations Commission (both state government bodies), as well as immigrant women organisational bodies.

Eman managed two charities, the Immigrant Women's Health Service (IWHS) and the Non-English Speaking Women's Housing Scheme Inc (NESH).

=== Government advisory posts ===
Sharobeem was appointment to an advisory post on the Settlement Services Advisory Council by the Australian Social Services Minister Christian Porter. Her other posts included those on the Justice Multicultural Advisory Council, State Library CALD Advisory Board and an Advisory Board Member of Multicultural NSW.

=== Media relations ===
In 2016, SBS Radio appointed Eman Sharobeem as a Community Engagement Manager.

== Investigation into corruption ==
=== ICAC investigation ===
In September 2018, the Independent Commission Against Corruption (ICAC) ruled that Eman Sharobeem stole over $750,000 from the two charities she managed, Immigrant Women's Health Service (IWHS) and the Non-English Speaking Women's Housing Scheme Inc (NESH). ICAC concluded that Sharobeem misused public funds while managing IWHS and NESH for the financial benefit of herself and members of her family, including her son Richard Sherobeem's cosmetic liposuction procedure. ICAC also investigated Sharobeem's false claim of academic qualifications which she used to gain employment at the Community Relations Commission (CRC) and to become a member of the Anti-Discrimination Board (ADB) of NSW. The investigation was titled by ICAC as "Operation Tarlo." ICAC initially referred the case to NSW Crime Commission and the Supreme Court ruled to freeze Sharobeem's financial assets.

ICAC provided a brief of evidence to the NSW Department of Public Prosecutions on 12 November 2019 before withdrawing it in April 2022. When asked, ICAC declined to comment apart from stating that they would provide an updated brief in the future.

=== FACS investigation ===
Prior to the ICAC investigation, the New South Wales Department of Family and Community Services (FACS) conducted its own preliminary investigation following anonymous complaints from staff at Sharobeem's organisation. The FACS investigation disregarded the complaints and as a result, staff at Sharobeem's organisation began collecting evidence and later submitted these documents in a complaint to the South Sydney Health Service.

== Awards ==
Eman was a finalist for the 2013 NSW Woman of the Year Awards.

Eman was a 2015 finalist for the Australian of the Year Awards, but in 2017, after the start of the ICAC investigation, the Awards Council dropped her name from their website.

Sharobeem was selected as one of 100 Most Influential Women in 2015 by The Australian Financial Review. She also received a commendation from NSW Premier Mike Baird.
