= Allan Moss =

Australian businessman (born 1949)

Allan Edward Moss AO (born 1949) is an Australian businessman, who was the Managing Director/CEO of Macquarie Group Ltd. Moss retired from Macquarie Group in May 2008 after 31 years, including a 15-year stint as the CEO. Prior to this Moss was a director of Hill Samuel Australia and led the team responsible for preparing the submission to the Australian Government to form Macquarie Bank in 1983. He held various positions within Macquarie Bank before becoming Managing Director/CEO in 1993. He had been a director of the company since 1989.

From 2015 to 2020, Moss served as one of the nine members of the Board of the Reserve Bank of Australia.

Moss is the Principal of Allan Moss Investments Pty Ltd, a family investment company. Allan Moss Investments Pty Ltd neither seeks nor accepts investments from outside parties.

Moss is an alumnus of Scots College (Sydney), the University of Sydney, and Harvard. He is married to former public servant and lawyer Irene Moss.
