= Cooma Correctional Centre =

Prison in New South Wales, Australia

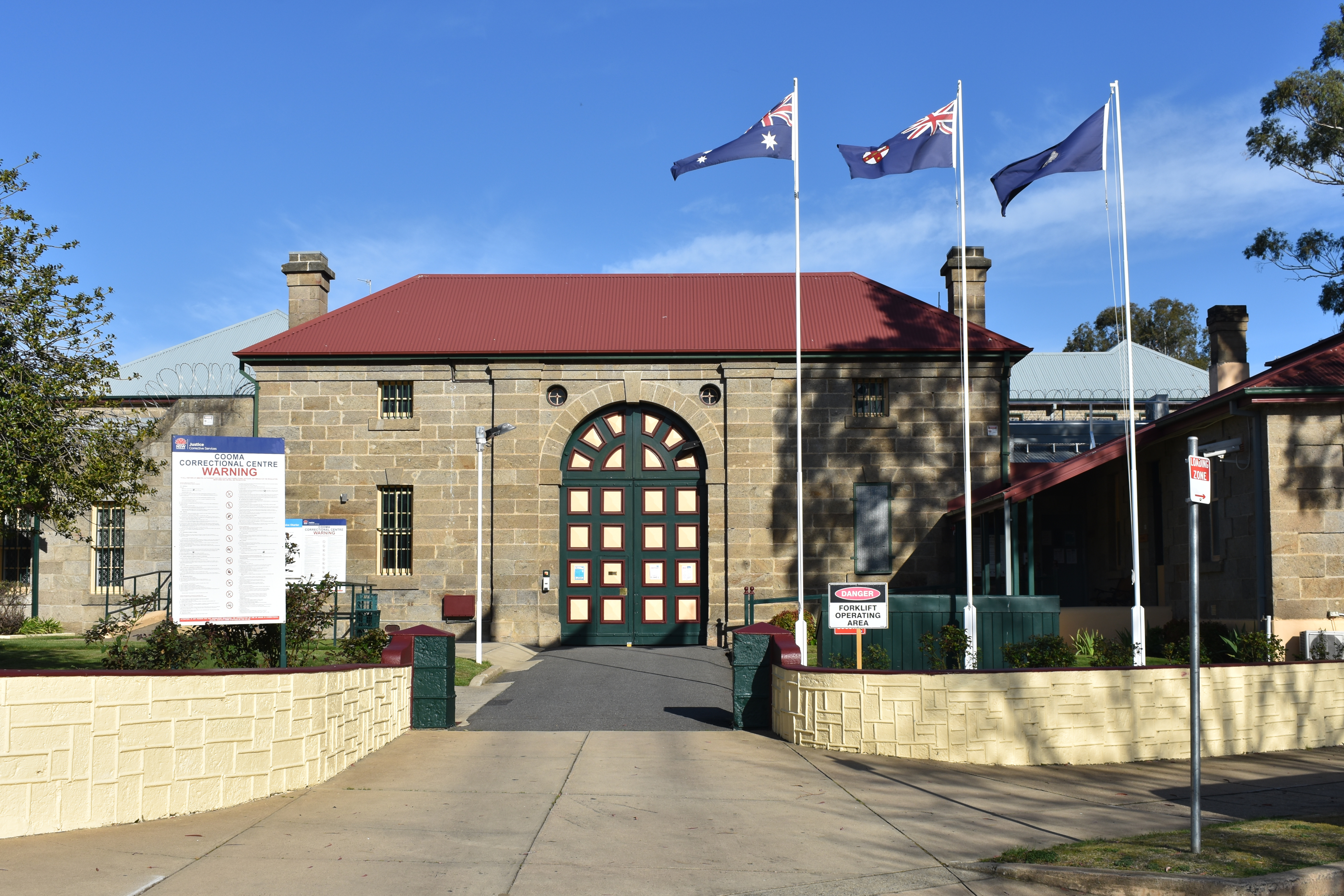
- Cooma Correctional Centre, 2020
- Interactive map of Cooma Correctional Centre
- Location: Cooma, New South Wales; 36°13.978′S 149°07.370′E
- Status: Operational
- Security class: Minimum to medium (males)
- Capacity: 160
- Opened: 1 November 1873; 8 March 1957; November 2001
- Closed: early 1900s; 10 July 1998
- Former name: Cooma Gaol
- Managed by: Corrective Services NSW

Cooma Correctional Centre, an Australian minimum to medium prison for males, is located in Cooma, New South Wales. The centre is operated by Corrective Services NSW an agency of the Department of Communities and Justice of the Government of New South Wales. The centre detains sentenced prisoners under New South Wales and/or Commonwealth legislation.

In 1957 up to 1984, Cooma operated as the world's only prison specifically for detaining men convicted of homosexual offences - as well as experiments done on gay men. In March 2025, it was officially added to the NSW Heritage Registry.

Adjacent to the Correctional Centre is the Corrective Services NSW Museum, showcasing the history of NSW Corrections since 1788.

== History ==
Construction of the Cooma Correctional Centre commenced in 1870 from local granite which was quarried from the hill where the Centre now stands. The Centre commenced operations on 1 November 1873 with 31 cells. In 1876 it was reduced to a Police Gaol and then a temporary Lunatic Asylum in 1877. The Centre closed temporarily in the early 1900s.

The Gaol was reopened on 8 March 1957 by the New South Wales Justice Minister Reg Downing for the sole purpose of incarcerating people convicted of homosexuality. Downing referred to Cooma as "the only penal institution in the world, so far as is known, devoted specifically to the detention of homosexual offenders".

The Gaol was again closed on 10 July 1998. Cooma Correctional Centre reopened for the second time in November 2001 following a 20 per cent increase in the prison population between 1995 and 2001.

== Facilities ==
The Centre is a minimum and medium security institution for inmates held in protective custody ("Special Management Area Placement" aka SMAP) such as former police officers, prison officers and other high-profile inmates, who would be at risk in the general prison system.

Located one hour's drive south of Canberra, 410 kilometres (250 mi) from Sydney and 652 kilometres (405 mi) from Melbourne, the Centre accommodates 160 inmates. There is approximately 53 staff, consisting of 31 custodial officers, 9 overseers and 13 support staff.

When not in use, the Cooma Correctional Centre has also been a storage space for the Australian Army and for the Snowy Mountains Scheme.

== Notable prisoners ==
The following individuals have served all or part of their sentence at the Cooma Correctional Centre:

Inmate name	Date sentenced	Length of sentence	Currently incarcerated	Date eligible for release/Release Date	Nature of conviction / Notoriety	Notes
Roger Rogerson	2 September 2016	Life imprisonment	No	Never to be released	Police officer, convicted of murder	Died of natural causes in prison
Salim Mehajer	22 June 2018	21 months	Yes	21 May 2019 (Released)	Property developer and former deputy mayor of Auburn City Council, convicted of electoral and insurance fraud	Convicted of perjury, now serving custodial sentence at Silverwater Correctional Complex
Jarryd Hayne	22 March 2021	5 years 9 months (3 years 8 months non-parole period)	No	12 June 2024	Sexual assault/ Former NRL rugby player	Served part of sentence at Parklea Correctional Centre before being transferred to Cooma Correctional Centre
Eddie Obeid	21 October 2021	7 years (3 years, 10 months non-parole period)	Yes	2028	Criminal conspiracy/ Former politician	Former politician who served in the New South Wales legislative council during the 1990s, 2000s and early 2010s and also served as a Minister during the late 1990s and early 2000s.

== See also ==
- List of New South Wales prisons
