= Blue Murder (miniseries) =

Australian TV miniseries

- DVD cover
- Genre: Crime drama
- Based on: In the Line of Fire by Darren Goodsir; Neddy by Arthur Smith and Tom Noble
- Written by: Ian David
- Directed by: Michael Jenkins
- Starring: Richard Roxburgh; Tony Martin; Steve Bastoni; Gary Sweet; Peter Phelps; Joy Smithers; Gary Day; Steve Jacobs; Marcus Graham; Alex Dimitriades; Loene Carmen; Bill Hunter; David Franklin
- Narrated by: Tony Martin; Steve Bastoni; Richard Roxburgh
- Theme music composer: John Gray
- Country of origin: Australia
- Original language: English
- No. of episodes: 2

Production
- Producer: Rod Allan
- Running time: 198 min (in total)
- Production company: Southern Star

Original release
- Network: ABC
- Release: 14 September – 21 September 1995

Blue Murder is a two-part Australian television crime drama miniseries produced by the Australian Broadcasting Corporation in 1995, and is based on true events.

Set in the 1970s and 1980s in Sydney, the miniseries concerns the relationship between controversial former detective Roger "the Dodger" Rogerson and notorious criminal Arthur "Neddy" Smith. Rogerson and his colleagues were accused of giving Smith a "green light" to commit crimes without police interference, with the relationship fraying when Rogerson orders hitman Chris "Mr. Rent-a-Kill" Flannery to murder Police Officer Michael Drury. The murder of prostitute Sallie-Anne Huckstepp also features.

Blue Murder is narrated by the characters of Rogerson, Smith, and Drury, and focuses on the corruption allegations that plagued the NSW Police Force at the time. Rogerson and Smith achieved a kind of celebrity status during the Wood Royal Commission into police corruption.

The screenplay was written by Ian David, who has written extensively on the people and events featured. The miniseries was directed by Michael Jenkins and produced by Rod Allan.

== Plot ==
Blue Murder consists of two 90-minute episodes, which are each divided into three individual "chapters". Each chapter is narrated by one of the three main characters: Neddy Smith, Michael Drury, and Roger Rogerson.

=== Episode one ===
"Green Light" (Narrated by Neddy Smith)

After a botched attempt at a payroll robbery, career criminal Arthur "Neddy" Smith (Tony Martin) is arrested by the NSW Police. He is brutally interrogated by Detective Sergeant Roger Rogerson (Richard Roxburgh), who attempts to coerce a confession. Smith keeps silent and is eventually released, on the understanding that he will henceforth be operating under the paid protection of Rogerson and his colleagues.

Smith initially works as a bodyguard for a prominent heroin dealer, but soon establishes his own drug business. One of Smith's underlings, Warren Lanfranchi (Alex Dimitriades), rips off a dealer who is connected with Rogerson; the police launch a manhunt for Lanfranchi, who goes into hiding. Lanfranchi begs Smith to smooth things over with Rogerson. But Rogerson and his colleagues tell Smith that Lanfranchi's actions won't be tolerated, referencing the fact that Lanfranchi pulled a gun on a policeman during a traffic stop (Although no round was discharged) before the robbery. Rogerson instructs Smith to bring Lanfranchi to a public meeting. Smith convinces Lanfranchi by assuring him he will face nothing worse than a verbal reprimand. Lanfranchi, however, tells his girlfriend, Sallie-Anne Huckstepp (Loene Carmen) that he fears a worse fate awaits him. Smith delivers an unarmed Lanfranchi to Rogerson, who shoots Lanfranchi dead.

At the subsequent inquest, Rogerson claims that Lanfranchi had pulled a gun, which would make the killing self-defense. However, Huckstepp complicates the matter by appearing on television to voice her suspicion that Lanfranchi’s shooting was premeditated. To redress the accusation, Rogerson convinces Smith to testify that he had not disarmed Lanfranchi before the meeting. Smith reluctantly does so, and Rogerson is cleared of suspicion. In gratitude, Rogerson and his colleagues award Smith a "green light", permitting him to commit crimes in Sydney with full police protection and, at times, assistance. This arrangement also requires that Smith occasionally act as a hit-man for Rogerson and his colleagues.

"Hitting a Blue" (Narrated by Michael Drury)

Michael Drury (Steve Bastoni) is an undercover officer in the NSW police. He receives a tip from an informant that a Melbourne-based drug dealer, Alan Williams (Marcus Graham), has a large quantity of heroin to sell. Drury poses as a buyer and travels to Melbourne to entrap Williams. As the transaction is about to be completed, members of the Victoria Police, who are assisting Drury with surveillance, break cover prematurely and attempt to apprehend Williams, who escapes after a lengthy chase. However, Drury's positive identification of Williams ensures his subsequent arrest.

On returning to Sydney, Drury is informed that the prosecution against Williams can proceed, but only if Drury testifies in open court. Drury is then contacted by Roger Rogerson, who offers Drury $25000 to change his testimony. Drury politely refuses, claiming that he would be unable to change his testimony without implicating himself. He also advises Rogerson to exercise caution as believes that the NSW police are being investigated by the Australian Federal Police.

When Drury's informant mysteriously turns up dead, Drury becomes concerned his own life might be in danger.

"Brotherhood" (Narrated by Roger Rogerson)

The Warren Lanfranchi shooting has cost Rogerson some of his prestige in the NSW Police, and he is transferred to Darlinghurst to take up a menial desk job. Feeling mistreated by his superiors, he deepens his connections with the criminal world, becoming acquainted with hitman Chris Flannery (Gary Sweet), who is a friend of Alan Williams, and becomes proactive in the Drury-Williams case. Williams is determined not to go back to prison, and makes it clear that he is prepared to pay any price to ensure Drury is unable to testify.

When one of Williams' associates is found dead, Drury again informs Rogerson that he will not be changing his testimony. Flannery suggests to Williams and Rogerson that he kill Drury, but he wants Rogerson to help with the plan. Williams, at Flannery's insistence, agrees to pay Flannery and Rogerson $50,000 each to eliminate Drury. Neddy Smith advises Rogerson to reconsider the hit, but Rogerson ignores him. Flannery goes to Drury's house at night and shoots him through his kitchen window.

=== Episode two ===
"Black Angus" (Narrated by Michael Drury)

Flannery shoots Drury twice, both rounds hitting him in the torso. However, Drury is able to stay conscious long enough to call emergency services. He is taken into surgery and the bullets are removed.

The investigation into the shooting is assigned to local detectives under the supervision of the acting head of CIB, Detective Superintendent "Black" Angus Macdonald (Bill Hunter), who is a long-time friend and colleague of Roger Rogerson. When Drury regains consciousness, he tells the detectives that Rogerson had approached him with the offer of a bribe in the Alan Williams investigation, and as such he believes Rogerson was involved in some way. Drury's claims are corroborated by fellow officer Lewis Roussos (Bogdan Koca), who witnessed the initial contact between Drury and Rogerson. Macdonald prevents any questioning of Rogerson from taking place, and subjects Drury, still in intensive care, to a heavy-handed and intimidating interrogation.

Although Drury does not back down from his accusations, Macdonald publicly displays his faith in Rogerson's innocence by bringing him to an official police dinner, to which all other invitees have brought their spouses. Macdonald is brought before the police commissioner (Les Dayman), who states that he will not allow Macdonald to protect Rogerson. He informs Macdonald that the Director of Public Prosecutions believes there is sufficient evidence to lay charges of bribery against Rogerson, and instructs Macdonald to charge him. Rogerson is formally charged with attempted bribery and suspended from duty.

"The Dodger" (Narrated by Roger Rogerson)

Angus Macdonald gives Lewis Roussos a significant promotion in exchange for reversing his testimony against Rogerson, and this leaves the prosecution against Rogerson with a damaging lack of evidence. The prosecution assigns an investigator, Bruce Kerrison (Dennis Miller), to investigate new leads.

Meanwhile, Chris Flannery has become embroiled in a mob war and is involved in a number of public shootings. Rogerson begins to doubt Flannery's ability to maintain his silence on the Drury shooting, and later discovers that Flannery has boasted about it to a number of criminal associates. One of these associates, Tony Eustace (Marshall Napier), faces legal troubles and is consequently compelled to inform against Flannery to Kerrison. When Flannery becomes aware of this, he confronts Eustace and shoots him dead. Rogerson organises a hit on Flannery, confident that the shooting will likely be interpreted as a mob reprisal. Flannery is subsequently killed.

Rogerson's barrister, Chester Porter QC (John Hargreaves), advises him that since the prosecution's case now relies solely on Drury's testimony, the best strategy for the trial is to undermine Drury's credibility with the jury. Porter proposes that they argue that Drury, as an undercover officer, is skilled in the art of deception, and thereby raise the issue of whether his testimony can be trusted. This strategy is successful and Rogerson is exonerated. However, after the trial, Alan Williams confesses his involvement in the Drury shooting to Kerrison, and the Federal investigators continue to build their case against Rogerson.

"Two Dogs" (Narrated by Neddy Smith)

As evidence against Rogerson mounts, many of his former colleagues abandon him, but Neddy Smith remains loyal. After Sallie-Anne Huckstepp obtains tapes that implicate members of the NSW Police, Smith drowns her in a lake to prevent the evidence from surfacing.

Rogerson appears on television to address some of the accusations. During an interview with Ray Martin on Willesee, Rogerson reveals that Smith has worked for him as an informant. Smith is furious, as he feels it will damage his criminal reputation. Soon after, an attempt is made on Smith's life, and he suspects Rogerson was involved. Rogerson professes his innocence, and while Smith believes this, he criticizes Rogerson for the many foolish decisions he has made, including the Warren Lanfranchi and Michael Drury shootings. Nonetheless, the two reconcile and continue to work together, often drinking heavily and becoming increasingly anti-social in their behaviour.

Rogerson is dismissed from the NSW Police, and later charged by the Federal Police for white-collar offences. Without Rogerson's protection, Smith's "green light" privileges are terminated. Afterward, Smith is involved in a drunken traffic altercation during which Glen Flack, played by David Franklin, stabs a motorist to death. The next day, Rogerson meets with Smith and convinces him to surrender peacefully, reminding him to maintain his silence about their dealings. Smith concludes that Rogerson had, after all, been behind the attempt on his life, but he realises this was just the nature of the lives they led, and he feels no resentment towards his long-time friend. Smith surrenders to the police.

"Epilogue"

A series of title cards reveal that Alan Williams received a 14-year prison sentence for conspiring to murder Michael Drury, Roger Rogerson was convicted for perverting the course of justice in relation to a bank account on a false name, although he was acquitted of conspiring to murder Drury, despite evidence given by Williams, and Neddy Smith received an indeterminate life sentence for multiple murders (which he served until his death on 8 September 2021). An updated epilogue in the 2001 broadcast and subsequent DVD releases also reveals that Michael Drury retired from the NSW Police in 2000, and that Neddy Smith was acquitted of the murder of Sallie-Anne Huckstepp, which remains unsolved.

== Cast ==
- Richard Roxburgh as Detective Sergeant Roger Rogerson
- Tony Martin as Arthur 'Neddy' Smith
- Steve Bastoni as Detective Michael Drury
- Gary Sweet as Chris Flannery
- Peter Phelps as Graham 'Abo' Henry
- Joy Smithers as Debra Smith
- Gary Day as Detective Bill Crofton
- Steve Jacobs as Detective Mal Rivers
- Loene Carmen as Sallie-Anne Huckstepp
- Alex Dimitriades as Warren Lanfranchi
- Marcus Graham as Alan Williams
- Laurie Foell as Pam Drury
- Richard Carter as Detective Lyail Chandler
- Paul Sonkkila as Detective Superintendent Noel Morey
- Bill Hunter as Detective Superintendent 'Black' Angus McDonald
- John Hargreaves as Chester Porter QC
- Dennis Miller as Detective Inspector Bruce Kerrison
- Marshall Napier as Tony Eustace
- John Jarratt as Jack Richardson
- Robert Morgan as Brian Hansen
- Geoff Morrell as Detective Les Knox
- Aaron Jeffery as Constable Bobby Williams
- Ian Bliss as Bobby Chapman
- John Walton as Jim Loomes
- Graham Rouse as Frank Avery
- Ian Bliss as Bobby Chapman
- Christopher Truswell as Hal Tate
- Ray Martin as himself*

* Footage of Ray Martin used in the miniseries was taken from his TV interviews with the real Sallie-Anne Huckstepp (taken from 60 Minutes in 1981) and Roger Rogerson (taken from Willesee in 1986).

== Production ==
The style of production was very similar to Jenkins' earlier series Scales of Justice, particularly the "observational" use of multiple hand-held cameras and the density of semi-improvised dialogue, which was further extended in his subsequent series Wildside.

Music was composed by Australian screen composer John Gray.

== Classification ==
Given its confronting content, the DVD release was classified MA 15+. An injunction brought during Arthur "Neddy" Smith's appeal against his life sentence saw its broadcast delayed in New South Wales and the Australian Capital Territory for six years, until 2001. In New Zealand the DVD release was classified R 18+ for graphic violence and offensive language.

== Home media ==
Title	Format	Ep #	Discs	Region 4 (Australia)	Special features	Distributors
Blue Murder (Complete Collection)	DVD	2	1	2001	None	Reel Corporation
Blue Murder (Ultimate Edition)	DVD	2	3	2 April 2009	Audio Commentary The Making of Blue Murder Editing Blue Murder Photo Gallery	Reel DVD
Blue Murder (Complete Collection)	DVD	2	3	4 August 2021	Audio Commentary The Making of Blue Murder Editing Blue Murder Photo Gallery	Via Vision Entertainment

== Awards and nominations ==
Awards	Category	Nominee	Result
1996 Logie Awards	Most Outstanding Actor	Richard Roxburgh	Won
1996 Logie Awards	Most Outstanding Achievement in Drama Production	Blue Murder	Won
1996 AFI Awards	Best Actor in a Leading Role in a Television Drama	Tony Martin	Won
1996 AFI Awards	Best Actor in a Leading Role in a Television Drama	Richard Roxburgh	Nominated
1996 AFI Awards	Best Screenplay in Television	Ian David	Won
1996 AFI Awards	Best Achievement in Direction in a Television Drama	Michael Jenkins	Won
1996 AFI Awards	Best Telefeature, Mini Series or Short Run Series	Rod Allan	Won
1996 AFI Awards	Best Music for a Mini Series	John Gray	Nominated

== Sequel ==
Blue Murder: Killer Cop is a miniseries sequel first broadcast on the Seven Network in August 2017, with Richard Roxburgh and Tony Martin reprising their roles as Rogerson and Smith.
