= Mitrit =

Village in Koura District, Lebanon

Coordinates: 34°15′39″N 35°50′32″E

Mitrit متريت
- Village
- Location within Lebanon
- Country: Lebanon
- Governorate: North
- District: Koura

Mitrit (Arabic: متريت, romanized: Mitrīt) is a village in the Koura District, in the North Governorate of Lebanon. The population is mainly Maronite Christian with a Shia Muslim minority.

== Demographics ==
In 2014, Christians made up 84.29% and Muslims made up 15.21% of registered voters in Mitrit. 81.30% of the voters were Maronite Catholics and 14.84% were Shiite Muslims.
