= Tony Martin (Australian actor) =

Australian actor (born 1953)

- Born: Anthony Martin; January 1, 1953 (age 73); Tamworth, New South Wales, Australia
- Occupation: Actor
- Years active: 1978–present
- Spouses: Lucy Martin (divorced); Rachael Blake (m. 2003)
- Children: Justin Martin

Anthony Martin (born 1 January 1953) is an Australian actor.

== Career ==
Martin is best known by Australian audiences for his portrayal of Detective Bill McCoy in the ABC's television series Wildside, and to older audiences as Rev Bob Brown in the TV series E Street. He played Bill Southgate in Heartbreak High.

He has also gained much acclaim as his portrayal of notorious underworld figure Arthur "Neddy" Smith in the Australian miniseries Blue Murder. He was nominated for Best Supporting Actor at the 1000 Film Critics Circle of Australia Awards for his role in The Interview.

== Personal life ==
He married Rachael Blake on 21 December 2003. They later appeared alongside one another in HBO Asia's presentation of Serangoon Road. His son, Justin, is also an actor, with appearances in Somersault and Blue Water High to his credit.

== Filmography ==
=== Films ===
Year	Title	Role	Type
1981	The Killing of Angel Street	Les	Feature film
1985	Archer	Stockrider	TV movie
1986	Twelfth Night	Police Officer	Feature film
1988	The First Kangaroos	Dan Frawley	TV movie
1988	Evil Angels	Lincoln Kingston	Feature film
1996	Parklands	Cliff	Feature film
1998	The Interview	Detective Sergeant John Steele	Feature film
2000	Blindman’s Bluff	Jean	Short film
2000	The Shot		Short film
2000	At the Edge of the World	The Husband	Short film
2000	Ariadne	Don Lazic	Short film
2001	The Big House	Williams	Short film
2003	Inspector Gadget 2	Dr. Claw	Feature film
2003	The Forest	Ben	TV movie
2006	Bye Bye Tim	Warwick	Short film
2006	Candy	Jim Wyatt	Feature film
2009	Closed for Winter	John Mills	Feature film
2010	Cropped	Bax	Short film
2011	Scumbus	Luke	Feature film
2011	Blood Brothers	Tony Gilham	TV movie
2014	Healing	Egan	Feature film

=== Television ===
Year	Title	Role	Type
1978	Chopper Squad	Tony	TV series, 1 episode
1980	Spring & Fall	Car Owner	TV series, 1 episode
1982	1915	Ned Reid	Miniseries, 3 episodes
1985	Palace of Dreams	Clarry	Miniseries, 2 episodes
1985	Colour in the Creek	Tom	Miniseries, 1 episode
1985	Zoo Family	Manuel	TV series, 1 episode
1987-88	Captain James Cook	Wilkinson	Miniseries, 2 episodes
1989–93	E Street	Reverend Bob Brown	TV series, 381 episodes
1993	G.P.	Garry Preston	TV series, 1 episode
1994–95	Heartbreak High	Bill Southgate	TV series, 52 episodes
1995	Blue Murder	Arthur ‘Neddy’ Smith	Miniseries, 2 episodes
1997–99	Wildside	Bill McCoy	TV series, 60 episodes
2000	The Games	Jack O’Shea, Barman (cameo)	TV series, 1 episode
2003	Bad Cop, Bad Cop	Gary Moon	Miniseries, 1 episode
2004	Jessica	Joe Bergman	Miniseries
2005	The Incredible Journey of Mary Bryant	Martin	Miniseries, 3 episodes
2009	False Witness	Bill Murray	Miniseries
2013	Serangoon Road	Macca, Australian journalist	TV series, 8 episodes
2016	Girt By Fear	The Jolly Swagman	TV series, 1 episode
2017	Blue Murder: Killer Cop	Arthur ‘Neddy’ Smith	Miniseries, 2 episodes
2020	Operation Buffalo	Attorney-General Richard Wilcox, MP	Miniseries, 6 episodes
2024	NCIS: Sydney	ASIO Agent Terry Barnes	TV series, 1 episode
