= Christopher Dale Flannery =

Australian contract killer (born 1948)

- Born: 1948; Brunswick, Victoria, Australia
- Disappeared: May 9, 1985 (aged 36–37)
- Other name: Mr Rent-a-Kill
- Occupations: Hitman, Bodyguard
- Spouse: Kathleen Flannery
- Children: 2
- Convictions: Housebreaking; assault; car theft; rape
- Penalty: 7 years’ imprisonment

Christopher Dale Flannery, nicknamed "Mr Rent-a-Kill" (born 7 July 1948 – disappeared 9 May 1985) is alleged to have been an Australian contract killer. Growing up in a working-class background in a culture that was suspicious of police, after leaving Melbourne he entered a life of crime and gang warfare that ended with his disappearance.

== Background and early career ==
Flannery was born in Brunswick, Victoria. His alcoholic, and abusive father left his family at age 9. After his father left, he, his sister Erin, Brother Eddie, and his Mother moved in with his Grandmother. His Mother and Grandmother may have neglected him. He killed his grandmothers cat and nailed it to a post near the house. He left school at the age of fourteen and received his first criminal conviction later that year. At 17, he was convicted of housebreaking, auto theft, assault against police, carrying firearms and rape, and was sentenced to seven years imprisonment.

== Criminal career ==
In 1974, Flannery and two other men were alleged to have committed an armed robbery on a David Jones store in Perth. They were arrested in Sydney by Detective Sergeant Roger Rogerson. It has been alleged that Flannery paid a bribe to Rogerson to escape conviction. Flannery was extradited to Perth but acquitted at trial. He was jailed on an outstanding Victorian warrant for rape.

== Mr Rent-a-Kill ==
On his release from prison, Flannery became a bouncer at Mickey's Disco, a night club in St Kilda, but was quickly bored by the work and moved into contract killing, hence the moniker "Mr Rent-A-Kill". According to police, one of his first jobs was the murder of barrister Roger Anthony Wilson. In August 1980, Flannery, Mark Alfred Clarkson and Kevin John Henry "Weary" Williams were arrested and charged with Wilson's murder. His body was never found, but police alleged that the trio had forced him off the road, abducted him and taken him to Pakenham, where Flannery shot him. Flannery is said to have missed and Wilson, bleeding profusely from a head wound, tried to escape. Flannery is then alleged to have gone "mad" and emptied his gun into Wilson's head and back.

In October 1981, Flannery, Clarkson and Williams were all acquitted. As Flannery left the court, detectives from New South Wales Police immediately arrested him for the murder of Sydney brothel owner Raymond Francis "Lizard" Locksley, who had been murdered at Menai on 11 May 1979. In 1982, a jury failed to reach a verdict and a retrial was adjourned until 18 April 1984. Flannery was subsequently acquitted.

Flannery's trial had been scheduled for 31 January 1984. However, he was provided with a medical certificate by Geoffrey Edelsten, certifying that he was unfit for trial in order to avoid Flannery being tried by a particular judge. Edelsten was convicted on 27 July 1990 for perverting the course of justice and for soliciting Flannery to assault a former patient. Edelsten was jailed for a year.

After his acquittal, Flannery bought a house in Turrella and brought his wife, Kathleen, and children up from Melbourne. Flannery went to work as a bodyguard for Sydney crime figure George Freeman. In late 1984, he became embroiled in the Sydney gangland war and sided with Neddy Smith. Smith claims that Flannery became paranoid and "was running around shooting at anyone he thought had anything to do with Barry McCann or Tom Domican". He claims that police attempted to negotiate an end to the gang wars, but that Flannery refused to stop the killings. At one meeting, according to Smith, Flannery told a high-ranking police officer, "You're not a protected species, you know – you're not a fucking koala!"

On 6 June 1984, Flannery is alleged to have been the gunman in the attempted murder of a Sydney Drug Squad detective, Michael Drury. Drury had been the undercover agent involved in a police drug operation which resulted in charges being laid against Flannery's friend, Alan Williams. Williams later testified that Flannery had attempted to bribe Drury through Rogerson in order to get the charges against Williams dismissed. When Drury rejected repeated attempts at bribery, Williams claims, he agreed to pay Flannery and Rogerson $50,000 each to murder Drury. On what he thought was his deathbed, Drury told detectives he believed he was shot because of "the Melbourne job".

As Flannery and his wife walked towards their house on 27 January 1985, the residence was sprayed with thirty shots from an Armalite rifle. No one was seriously injured, though Flannery was shot through the hand as he pushed his wife's head down and he suffered some other minor abrasions. Flannery blamed Domican, who was later charged and convicted of attempted murder, but the conviction was overturned on appeal. Rogerson was seen in the area in the days after the shooting and was interviewed by police. He claimed he was just curious to see what kind of damage such a gun could do. He was released without charge. Drury was also interviewed, but was not considered a serious suspect.

On 23 April 1985, Flannery was allegedly sent to murder Tony "Spaghetti" Eustace. Eustace was found by two schoolchildren who were returning home from sports training at about 7pm. He had been shot six times in the back outside the Airport Hilton in North Arncliffe, and was lying beside his gold Mercedes, bleeding profusely. He was rushed to hospital. Police attempted to speak to him, but Eustace told them to "fuck off", and he died a short time later.

By the time of his disappearance and presumed death, police stated that they believed Flannery was responsible for up to a dozen murders.

== Disappearance ==
Not long after the attack on his family, Flannery moved into an inner Sydney apartment which was close to CIB headquarters. On 9 May 1985, Flannery received a phone call from Freeman asking for a meeting. Flannery, in leaving for the rendezvous, was unable to start his car. Flannery contacted Freeman who told him to catch a taxi. Flannery did so.

After exiting The Connaught building, where he lived, onto Liverpool Street, Flannery was never seen again. It has been claimed by Smith that police may have been responsible for Flannery's disappearance, as Smith noticed him enter a police car with officers he knew on 9 May. The officers had allegedly offered to take Flannery to meet with Freeman.

== Coroner's findings ==
On 6 June 1997, New South Wales State Coroner Greg Glass handed down the finding that Flannery was murdered, most probably on or about 9 May 1985. He also found that the key to solving the murder lay with Rogerson. On 22 February 2004, Rogerson told the Seven Network Sunday programme, "Flannery was a complete pest. The guys up here in Sydney tried to settle him down. They tried to look after him as best they could, but he was, I believe, out of control. Maybe it was the Melbourne instinct coming out of him. He didn't want to do as he was told, he was out of control, and having overstepped that line, well, I suppose they said he had to go but I can assure you I had nothing to do with it." Flannery left a wife and two children.

== In popular culture ==
- Flannery's early experience in prison was the inspiration for the Ray Mooney play and subsequent 1994 Alkinos Tsilimidos film Everynight ... Everynight. The main character Dale, portrayed in the film by David Field, was based on Flannery. Mooney, a Melbourne author and playwright, was a friend of Flannery's and used some of the real and alleged events in Flannery's life as the basis for his 1988 novel, A Green Light, featuring a protagonist called Johnny Morgan, based on Flannery.
- Blue Murder is a 1995 two-part mini-series based on events that led to the Wood Royal Commission into corruption in the NSW Police Force. Flannery was portrayed by Gary Sweet.
- In the 2009 series Underbelly: A Tale of Two Cities, Dustin Clare portrays Flannery as a reckless bully with links to the planning of the Great Bookie robbery and to drug trafficker Robert Trimbole. In the series, he is eventually murdered by Lenny McPherson and George Freeman.
- In the June 2010 Australian true-crime series Tough Nuts: Australia's Hardest Criminals, on the Crime & Investigation Network channel, Stan "The Man" Smith was named as Flannery's killer. It is hosted by crime writer Tara Moss.

== See also ==
- List of fugitives from justice who disappeared
- List of unsolved murders (1980–1999)
