= Irene Moss =

Australian solicitor and public servant

Irene Moss AO
- Born: December 9, 1948 (age 77)
- Education: University of Sydney; Harvard Law School
- Occupations: Solicitor, public servant
- Spouse: Allan Moss

Irene Kwong Moss AO (born December 9, 1948) is an Australian solicitor and former public servant.

She graduated from the University of Sydney with a Bachelor of Arts (Government) and a Bachelor of Laws and from Harvard Law School with a Master of Laws, and became a solicitor at the Supreme Court of New South Wales and the High Court of Australia. Moss was awarded an Honorary Doctorate of Laws by the University of New South Wales.

After some time working for the New South Wales anti-discrimination board, she was the Federal Race Discrimination Commissioner for the Human Rights and Equal Opportunity Commission from 1986 to 1994. She was the New South Wales ombudsman from 1995, and from 1999 to 2004 was the Commissioner of the Independent Commission Against Corruption. She has been a board member for various organisations, including becoming the chair of the free speech organisation Australia's Right To Know, a coalition of major Australian media organisations in 2007. Moss has also led a number of Government inquiries. Moss chaired the Sax Institute, a Sydney-based public health and health research organisation, from 2006 to 2018.

She is married to the former chief executive of Macquarie Bank, Allan Moss.
