= Megan Latham =

Australian judge

The Honourable Megan Latham

Commissioner of the New South Wales Independent Commission Against Corruption
- In office 28 January 2014 – 30 November 2016
- Nominated by: Barry O'Farrell, Premier
- Preceded by: David Ipp
- Succeeded by: Reginald Blanch (acting)

Judge of the Supreme Court of NSW
- Incumbent
- Assumed office 12 April 2005

Judge of the District Court of NSW
- In office 7 August 1998 – 11 April 2005

Personal details
- Born: Megan Fay Latham (Note: Birth notice incorrectly records name as Megan Faye Latham; (with an 'e' after Fay).); 24 August 1954 (age 72) Brighton-Le-Sands, New South Wales, Australia
- Education: MLC School
- Alma mater: University of NSW
- Occupation: Judge
- Profession: Solicitor, Barrister, Judge

Megan Fay Latham (born 24 August 1954) is a former judge of the Supreme Court of New South Wales and was the sole Commissioner of the New South Wales Independent Commission Against Corruption from January 2014 to November 2016.

== Background and early years ==
Born in 1954 and raised in the Cronulla area of Sydney, Latham was educated at MLC School, in Burwood before matriculating and studying Arts/Law at the University of New South Wales where she graduated in 1979.

Between 1979 and 1982, Latham was employed as a solicitor in Leeton; and then commenced working for the NSW Government, initially in the Lands Department and then in the office of the Clerk of the Peace, prior to secondment to the Premier's Department. Latham was admitted to the New South Wales Bar Association in 1987 and appointed as a Crown Prosecutor, until 1994. In mid-1996, Latham was appointed as the first and only female Crown Advocate of New South Wales.

== Judicial career ==
Latham was sworn in as a NSW District Court judge in August 1998; and as a judge of the NSW Supreme Court in April 2005.

During her time at the Supreme Court, prominent cases included the sentencing of Roger Kingsley Dean, a nurse at the Quakers Hill Nursing Home who pleaded guilty to eleven counts of murder of elderly residents, attributed to arson. Dean was sentenced to life imprisonment without possibility of parole.

=== Commissioner of the NSW Independent Commission Against Corruption ===
Following the announcement of the premature retirement of The Honourable David Ipp QC due to ill-health in October 2013, Latham was appointed as the nominee to replace Ipp as the sole Commissioner of the NSW Independent Commission Against Corruption and took up her appointment in late January 2014.

In November 2016, Latham informed the Governor of New South Wales that she intended to resign as commissioner effective 30 November, following the state government's overhaul of the commission, which would see three commissioners appointed and would require Latham to re-apply for the role.
