= Soliciting to murder =

Statutory offense in Britain and Ireland

Soliciting to murder is a statutory offence of incitement in England and Wales and Northern Ireland and the Republic of Ireland.

In common parlance, the act of soliciting to murder may be thought of as "hiring a hitman", though the word "hiring" is used loosely, and the act requires no financial transaction to qualify as such. Merely the intent to engage another in an act of murder qualifies as soliciting.

== England and Wales ==
This offence is created by section 4 of the Offences against the Person Act 1861 which reads:

... whosoever shall solicit, encourage, persuade, or endeavour to persuade, or shall propose to any person, to murder any other person, whether he be a subject of His/Hers Majesty or not, and whether he be within the King’s/Queen's dominions or not, shall be guilty of a misdemeanor, and being convicted thereof shall be liable ... to [imprisonment for life] ...

=== Textual amendments ===
The words omitted at the beginning were repealed by sections 5(10)(a) and 65(5) of, and Schedule 13 to, the Criminal Law Act 1977.

The words omitted elsewhere were repealed by the Statute Law Revision Act 1892.

The words "imprisonment for life" were substituted for the words from "be kept" to "years", on 8 September 1977, by section 5(10)(b) of the Criminal Law Act 1977.

=== Case law ===
The following cases are relevant:

- R v Fox (1870) 19 WR 109 (Ir)
- R v Banks (1873) 12 Cox 393
- R v Ransford (1874) 13 Cox 9, (1874) 3 LT 488, CCR
- R v Most (1881) 7 QBD 244, (1881) 14 Cox 583, (1881) 45 JP 696
- R v Bourtzeff (1898) 127 CCC Sess Pap 284
- R v McCarthy [1903] 2 IR 146
- R v Krause, 66 JP 121, 18 TLR 238
- R v Antonelli and Barberi (1905) 70 JP 4
- R v Shephard [1919] 2 KB 125, 14 Cr App R 26, CCA

=== Visiting forces ===
Soliciting to murder is an offence against the person for the purposes of section 3 of the Visiting Forces Act 1952.

=== Mode of trial ===
Soliciting to murder is an indictable-only offence.

=== Sentence ===
Soliciting to murder is punishable with imprisonment for life or for any shorter term.

See the Crown Prosecution Service sentencing manual.

The following cases are relevant:

- R v Raw (1983) 5 Cr App R (S) 229
- Houseley and Kibble [1994] 15 Cr App R (S) 155
- R v Adamthwaite [1994] 15 Cr App R (S) 241
- Attorney-General's Reference No 43 of 1996 (Costaine) [1997] 1 Cr App R (S) 378
- R v Robinson [2003] 2 Cr App R (S) 13
- R v Montague [2004] 1 Cr App R (S) 137
- R v Rai [2006] 2 Cr App R (S) 13
- R v Saleem, Javad and Muhid [2008] 2 Cr App R (S) 12
- R v Hills [2007] EWCA Crim 3152, [2008] 2 Cr App R (S) 29

=== Orders on conviction ===
As to violent offender orders, see section 98(3) of the Criminal Justice and Immigration Act 2008.

=== History ===
Initially, a person guilty of an offence under section 4 was liable on conviction to penal servitude for a term not more than ten and not less than three years or to be imprisoned for a term not exceeding two years, with or without hard labour.

From 1948 to 8 September 1977, the maximum sentence was imprisonment for a term of ten years.

== Northern Ireland ==
This offence is created by section 4 of the Offences against the Person Act 1861. The penalty was increased by article 5(1) of the Criminal Law (Northern Ireland) Order 1977 (S.I. 1977/1249 (N.I. 16)).

== Republic of Ireland ==
This offence is created by section 4 of the Offences against the Person Act 1861.
