= Independent Commission Against Corruption (New South Wales) =

Government agency in New South Wales, Australia

- Abbreviation: ICAC

Agency overview
- Formed: 1988
- Annual budget: A$25 million (2012–2013)

Jurisdictional structure
- Operations jurisdiction: New South Wales, Australia
- Legal jurisdiction: As per operations jurisdiction
- Governing body: Government of New South Wales
- Constituting instrument: Independent Commission Against Corruption Act, 1988 (NSW)
- Specialist jurisdiction: Anti-corruption

Operational structure
- Headquarters: Level 7, 255 Elizabeth Street, Sydney, New South Wales, Australia
- Elected officer responsible: The Hon Chris Minns MP, Premier of New South Wales
- Agency executive: The Hon John Hatzistergos AM, Chief Commissioner

Website
- icac.nsw.gov.au

The Independent Commission Against Corruption (ICAC) is an agency of the Government of New South Wales, Australia. It is responsible for eliminating and investigating corrupt activities and enhancing the integrity of the state's public administration. The commission was established in 1989, pursuant to the Independent Commission Against Corruption Act, 1988 (NSW), modelled after the ICAC in Hong Kong.

It is led by a chief commissioner, appointed for a fixed five-year term, and two part-time commissioners. In November 2016, NSW Premier Mike Baird suggested a move from a sole commissioner to a three-commissioner system. However, this was strongly criticised by two former ICAC commissioners as weakening and politicising the organisation, leading to the resignation of then-Commissioner Megan Latham. The chief commissioner is currently John Hatzistergos, former state Labor minister and District Court judge. Helen Murrell SC and Paul Lakatos SC are the part-time commissioners.

The chief commissioner is required to submit a report on ICAC activities to the Parliament of New South Wales and, whilst independent of the politics of government, reports informally to the Premier of New South Wales. The commission is charged with educating public authorities, officials and members of the public about corruption.

== Inspector ==
The Inspector of the Independent Commission Against Corruption is an independent statutory officer who holds the ICAC accountable for the exercise of its functions. The inspector is not answerable to ICAC and is located in separate premises. Their role includes audits of the ICAC's operations to ensure compliance with the law; dealing with complaints about the conduct of the ICAC and its officers; and assessing the effectiveness and appropriateness of ICAC procedures.

The inspector has extensive powers to investigate the conduct of the ICAC, including obtaining documents and requiring ICAC officers to attend before them and answer questions. The inspector can also sit as a royal commissioner in order to conduct investigations; in this capacity they can compel witnesses to provide evidence. The inspector can deal with complaints about the ICAC which concern abuses of power, impropriety, misconduct, delays in investigation and maladministration.

== Structure and operation ==
The ICAC has jurisdiction over state and local government in New South Wales. This extends to parliamentarians, local councillors, the Governor of New South Wales, public servants, and staff of universities and state-owned corporations. Anyone can refer a matter to the commission. In 2014 it was estimated that less than one per cent out of around 3,000 complaints annually result in a public hearing. The commission has the coercive powers of a royal commission and can compel witnesses to testify. Public hearings are designed to act as a preventative measure against corruption. Where the ICAC rules that an official has acted corruptly, the charges are referred to the criminal justice system for consideration by the Director of Public Prosecutions.

There are only limited controls on admissible evidence, which may be obtained by compulsion and coercion or other means that would make it inadmissible in a court of law. It also has telephone intercept powers. Often evidence used in ICAC cases cannot subsequently be used in related criminal proceedings. There is no right to silence for witnesses and failure to testify (along with misleading the commission) can lead to five-year jail terms. While the ICAC cannot impose custodial sentences (other than for procedural matters), it can recommend that criminal charges be considered by the Department of Public Prosecution. In practice it has achieved very few convictions and some of its findings, such as that against former Premier Nick Greiner, have been found to go beyond its powers.

From its establishment until November 2016, the ICAC was led by a single commissioner, who, although the agency belongs within the New South Wales Premier's Department, reported directly to the presiding officers of the Parliament of New South Wales. The commissioner served a single five-year term and could not be dismissed except by the Governor. Following the passage of the Independent Commission Against Corruption Amendment Act 2016 (NSW), the agency was reconstituted as a three-member commission, comprising a chief commissioner and two other commissioners; and in order for a public hearing to be held as part of any corruption investigation, the chief commissioner and at least one other commissioner must agree.

== Development ==
The 1980s saw a number of corruption scandals break around Australia, involving the Labor administrations in New South Wales, Victoria and Western Australia (WA Inc), the Liberal government in Tasmania and the Nationals administration in Queensland (Fitzgerald Inquiry).

In 1988, Nick Greiner, a Liberal, ran against Labor in New South Wales on an anti-corruption platform and won. Introducing legislation to establish the ICAC, Greiner told Parliament:

In recent years, in New South Wales we have seen: a Minister of the Crown gaoled for bribery; an inquiry into a second, and indeed a third, former Minister for alleged corruption; the former Chief Stipendiary Magistrate gaoled for perverting the course of justice; a former Commissioner of Police in the courts on a criminal charge; the former Deputy Commissioner of Police charged with bribery; a series of investigations and court cases involving judicial figures including a High Court Judge; and a disturbing number of dismissals, retirements and convictions of senior police officers for offences involving corrupt conduct.... No government can maintain its claim to legitimacy while there remains the cloud of suspicion and doubt that has hung over government in New South Wales.

— Nick Greiner, as Premier of New South Wales, 1988.

== History ==
The ICAC's first task was to investigate activities of the previous Wran and Unsworth governments. No charges were recommended by the commission.

In 1992, the ICAC ruled that Premier Greiner's offer of a government job to former minister Terry Metherell was an act of "technical" corruption. Although the charges were later dismissed by the courts, the four independent MPs on whom the premier relied for a majority in the Legislative Assembly indicated that they would no longer support his leadership. Greiner resigned and was replaced by John Fahey.

In 2008, the ICAC documented entrenched corruption within RailCorp. A range of offences were investigated, involving staff at many levels, and A$19 million was found to have been improperly allocated.

The ICAC began focusing on ministerial level corruption from 2010. In November 2010, it released a report titled Investigation into Corruption Risks Involved in Lobbying. It recommended the implementation of a new lobbying regulatory scheme to promote transparency and to reduce both the risk of corruption and public distrust.

In 2014, the ICAC investigated alleged corrupt activities relating to a water infrastructure company. Premier Barry O'Farrell was asked if he recalled being given an expensive bottle of wine by the company's CEO. O'Farrell said he had no recollection of such a gift. Evidence of the gift was produced the next day, and O'Farrell announced his resignation as party leader and premier. Later during the same case, NSW Police Minister Mike Gallacher resigned as minister following allegations that he been involved in obtaining an illegal political donation. The ICAC ultimately did not proceed with corruption charges.

On 15 April 2015, following an ICAC investigation into alleged conduct of Margaret Cunneen SC, the High Court of Australia found that the ICAC had exceeded its authority based on a misinterpretation of "corrupt conduct" in the relevant law. This raised questions about whether the ICAC had exceeded its powers in other high-profile corruption investigations. Nonetheless, in May 2015 the ICAC referred the allegations against Cunneen to the NSW Director of Public Prosecutions; in July 2015 the Solicitor General determined that a prosecution was not warranted.

Some of the ICAC's investigations into governmental corruption led it to recommend legislation to cancel some mining licences without compensation, and such legislation had been enacted by the NSW parliament. While the High Court rejected challenges to the validity of that legislation, its Cuneen decision raised questions about the validity of the investigations. The ICAC disagreed with the High Court's interpretation of the relevant law and urged the NSW government to legislate to broaden its powers retrospectively, so as to legalise its earlier actions as well as current investigations. However, the inspector of the ICAC, former Supreme Court judge David Levine QC, criticised the ICAC's response as an "improper and dismissive attack on the judgment of the highest court in the land", and warned against "any knee-jerk legislative reaction".

On 6 May 2015, the NSW government rushed through the parliament, with all-party support, a bill to amend the Independent Commission Against Corruption Act. The amendments, which came into effect immediately, reversed the Cunneen decision; they also amended the principal Act so as to validate retrospectively the investigations that had led to the recent convictions, the convictions affected by the Cunneen interpretation of the ICAC's powers, and other ICAC investigations. The High Court dismissed a subsequent challenge against the amendment act.

In October 2021, the ICAC announced an investigation into whether Premier Gladys Berejiklian had breached public trust or encouraged corrupt behaviour during her romantic relationship with MP Daryl Maguire. In response, Berejiklian announced her intention to resign as premier and as a member of the Legislative Assembly. On 29 June 2023, the ICAC found that Berejiklian had engaged in "serious corrupt conduct" by refusing to report Maguire's corrupt statements to her, but did not recommend criminal charges against her as ICAC evidence is not admissible in criminal court. In September 2023, Berejiklian lodged legal action to seek a judicial review of the ICAC's findings against her.

=== 2026 investigation Into NSW Liberal Party ===
In July 2026, the ICAC started public hearings for Operation Rosny. This is an investigation into allegations that senior New South Wales Liberal Party officials had been involved in a smear campaign to oust David Chandler, the NSW building commissioner, and former police minister, Liberal Party MP David Elliott, at the behest of the fugitive property developer Jean Nassif. Under NSW law, property developers and their proxies are prohibited from making political donations. Nassif, who fled Australia to avoid arrest for alleged fraud offences, had supported a group of conservative Christian, right-wing Liberals known as "The Reformers". The group, which included two brothers of former Premier Dominic Perrottet, was formed to influence government decisions, for branch stacking and to influence preselection for Liberal candidates.

Nassif allegedly paid a total of $2,000,000 AUD to Reformers members; hotel baron Michael O’Hara paid $165,000; and Catholic Schools NSW, a peak body for around 600 private diocese Catholic schools, donated over $250,000.

== Support and criticism ==
While the ICAC has received support from some sections of the media, it received substantial criticism in the wake of the Greiner and O'Farrell resignations. In 1994, former Premier Neville Wran suggested that the government should consider "[ridding] the ICAC legislation of its glaring abuses of civil rights". In the wake of the findings of corruption against Eddie Obeid and Ian Macdonald, Graham Richardson, a former Labor Senator, opined that the ICAC had caused "collateral damage" to innocent people, citing Eric Roozendaal as an example. After O'Farrell's resignation, Bruce Baird, a former State Deputy Liberal Leader who voted for the ICAC establishing legislation, described the commission as a "Star Chamber" that "trashes people's reputations". Professor Peter van Onselen also questioned the "Star Chamber" nature of the commission and its history of "besmirching reputations". Former Victorian Premier Jeff Kennett suggested that the ICAC's actions with regard to O'Farrell had been "entrapment", while Chris Merritt of The Australian suggested that the investigation had been "ludicrous" and that it was Geoffrey Watson (counsel assisting the ICAC) who should have resigned instead. Nick Di Girolamo, a witness before the ICAC in proceedings that led to the resignation of O'Farrell, lodged a complaint in 2014 with the NSW Bar Association about Watson's behaviour during the hearings. The Cunneen investigation was criticised, in the light of the eventual High Court decision, as having been heavy-handed from the start.

On the other hand, in an editorial in the wake of the O'Farrell resignation, the Sydney Morning Herald quoted new NSW Premier Mike Baird as saying that the ICAC "is doing exactly what it should do"; the newspaper advocated creation of a federal equivalent. Likewise, Australian Greens Senator Lee Rhiannon renewed the Greens' long-standing call for a national equivalent to ICAC. Calls for changes to how the ICAC operates following O'Farrell's resignation were rejected by Professor Anne Twomey, an expert in public and constitutional law at the University of Sydney, because it was O'Farrell who misled the ICAC, breached the parliamentary code of conduct and failed to properly declare pecuniary interests.

A more historical defence of the ICAC has been that it was set up by a Liberal government in an expectation, shared fearfully by the Labor opposition, that it would be in effect "a standing royal commission into Labor", and that Coalition members and supporters were appalled that it did not turn out that way.

As of mid-December 2015, disputes continue.

== Commissioners ==
Until 2017, the ICAC was led by a single commissioner, who served for a non-renewable term of five years. From 7 August 2017, this system was changed to a board comprising a chief commissioner and two part-time commissioners appointed for a term of five years.

The following individuals have been appointed as commissioner since the commission's establishment:

Order	Commissioner	Term start	Term end	Term in office	Notes
1	Ian Temby QC	13 March 1989	12 March 1994	4 years, 364 days	
–	The Honourable John Mant (Acting)	12 March 1994	14 November 1994	247 days	
2	The Honourable Barry O'Keefe AM QC	14 November 1994	13 November 1999	4 years, 364 days	
3	Irene Moss AO	14 November 1999	13 November 2004	4 years, 365 days	
4	The Honourable Jerrold Cripps QC	14 November 2004	13 November 2009	4 years, 364 days	
5	The Honourable David Ipp AO QC	16 November 2009	24 January 2014	4 years, 69 days	
6	The Honourable Megan Latham	28 January 2014	30 November 2016	2 years, 307 days	
–	The Honourable Reg Blanch QC (Acting)	30 November 2016	7 August 2017	250 days	
Order	Chief Commissioner	Term start	Term end	Term in office	Notes
7	The Honourable Peter Hall QC	7 August 2017	6 August 2022	4 years, 364 days	
8	The Honourable John Hatzistergos AM	7 August 2022	Incumbent (Expires 6 August 2027)	4 years, 105 days	

=== Part-time commissioners ===
Commissioner	Term start	Term end	Term in office	Notes
Patricia McDonald SC	7 August 2017	6 August 2022	4 years, 364 days	
Stephen Rushton SC	7 August 2017	6 August 2022	4 years, 364 days	
Helen Murrell SC	7 August 2022	Incumbent (Expires 6 August 2027)	4 years, 105 days	
Paul Lakatos SC	12 September 2022	Incumbent (Expires 11 September 2027)	4 years, 69 days	

== High-profile cases ==
- Australian Museum theft of over 2,000 zoological specimens
- Gladys Berejiklian
- City of Botany Bay
- City of Canterbury
- City of Rockdale
- New South Wales Liberal Party
- Nick Greiner
- Nola Fraser
- Ian Macdonald
- Daryl Maguire
- Eddie Obeid
- Orange Grove affair
- Karyn Paluzzano
- Eman Sharobeem
- Rear Admiral Geoffrey Smith

== See also ==
- Crime in Sydney
- Independent Broad-based Anti-corruption Commission
- Independent Commissioner Against Corruption (Northern Territory)
- Independent Commission Against Corruption (South Australia)
- Royal Commission into the New South Wales Police Service
