= West of Sunshine =

- Directed by: Jason Raftopoulos
- Written by: Jason Raftopoulos
- Produced by: Jason Raftopoulos; Alexandros Ouzas; Exile Productions
- Starring: Damian Hill
- Cinematography: Thom Neal
- Edited by: Paul Rowe
- Music by: Lisa Gerrard; James Orr
- Distributed by: Exile Entertainment Pty Ltd
- Release dates: 1 September 2017 (Venice Film Festival); 23 August 2018 (Theatrical release)
- Running time: 78 mins
- Country: Australia

West of Sunshine is 2017 Australian drama film directed by Jason Raftopoulos and starring Damian Hill. Set in Melbourne, it depicts an eventful day in the life of Jimmy, an inveterate gambler, and his estranged son Alex.

== Plot ==
Scruffy-haired, heavily tattooed Jimmy is a courier for a small company, and has a A$15,000 debt to Banos, the tough owner of a car repair shop where Jimmy once worked, and who has given him a deadline of 5 o'clock that day to repay him, or suffer dire consequences. Jimmy's mind is preoccupied with the prospects of a horse that's running (race two at Ballarat) that day. He picks up his mate Steve, a fellow courier. He is late to pick up his pre-pubescent son Alex, who he's promised to babysit that day, and is harassed by his ex-wife Karen.

He arrives at her house in his car, an immaculate 1968 Ford Fairlane, previously owned from new by his own father, who deserted his family when Jimmy was young. Alex reluctantly joins his father, for whom he has no respect, and flagrantly defies his every instruction. His father's chief leverage over him (and subject of much of the bickering) is use of his smartphone and promise of a new football.

Jimmy reports late for work at the depot, and because of the presence of Alex is obliged to use the Fairlane for deliveries rather than a company vehicle. Alex gets to experience the inside of a variety of Melbourne businesses. His deliveries completed, they stop for lunch at a suburban hotel with TAB betting facilities, and are joined by Steve. Jimmy is anxious to put some money on his tip, and borrows a substantial sum from Steve, who puts somewhat less on the same horse, which wins, and Jimmy has more than enough to pay off his debts.

He rings Banos with the good news, but then cannot refrain from trying to build on his good fortune and loses the lot. Fearing Banos, he pleads with Steve to lend him the money, alienating his mate, who refuses point blank; he has debts too. Getting desperate, Jimmy offers the Fairlane to a used-car dealer; it's valued at $35,000, but they settle on $25,000 cash. But while the would-be purchaser is at the bank, Jimmy has a change of heart and he and Alex drive off.

Steve approaches Mel, a friend from his younger days, who has prospered and now has a small bakery. She offers to lend him the sum if he will deliver some small Ziploc packages of white powder to various addresses. He tells Alex they contain vitamin C. While Jimmy is purchasing icecreams at a roadside van, Alex opens one of the bags and just as he is putting some in his mouth, Jimmy becomes aware of the situation, rushes back to the car and forces Alex to cough it up. He confesses the truth to Alex, they exchange confidences, resulting in a reconciliation.

Jimmy confronts Banos with the few hundreds of dollars he has left, and Banos signals to his men, then as they have beaten him to the ground and are kicking him, Banos calls them off in an apparent change of heart.

Jimmy signs the car over to Banos and pedals a pushbike back to his ex-wife's residence, Alex on the handle-bars. Night is falling, and when asked by his mother how the day went, he replies "It was the best day ever".

== Cast ==
- Damian Hill as Jimmy
- Tony Nikolakopoulos as Banos
- Arthur Angel as Steve
- Tyler (Ty) Perham as Alex (Note: Hill's real-life stepson)
- Faye Smythe as Karen
- Kat Stewart as Mel
- Jordan Fraser-Trumble as Tailor

== Production ==
West of Sunshine was directed by Jason Raftopoulos. It is based on his 2011 award-winning short film, Father's Day.

It is set and shot in the western suburbs of Melbourne, Victoria over 18 days; many scenes were shot in real business premises, with the workers going about their usual business. It was shot in widescreen format, and runs for 78 minutes.

== Release ==
West of Sunshine had its world premiere on 1 September 2017 at the 74th edition of the Venice International Film Festival, in the Orizzonti (Horizons) section, which is dedicated to new trends in world cinema.

It was released in cinemas on 23 August 2018.

== Reception ==
The audience at the Venice Film Festival responded to West of Sunshine with a five-minute standing ovation. As of February 2024, West of Sunshine has a critics' score of 81% based on 21 reviews, indicating critical acclaim.

It received generally favourable reviews, some tracing its inspiration to Vittorio De Sica's Bicycle Thieves, with most commenting that it sprang no surprises. Several noted that it was the offshoot of Raftopolous' 2011 short Father's Day and Paul Ireland's Pawno (also starring Hill). Thom Neal's cinematography was praised, as was the soundtrack by Lisa Gerrard and James Orr.

Variety called it an "impressive feature debut", while The Guardian critic wrote that its "down-at-heel Aussie vibe" invited comparison with other "bawlers and brawlers", such as Kriv Stenders' 2007 film Boxing Day or David Michod's 2010 crime drama Animal Kingdom.

== Awards and nominations ==
West of Sunshine won the 2018 Jury Grand Prix, Best feature film, at the Rencontres internationales du cinéma des Antipodes (Antipodean Film Festival) in Saint-Tropez, France. and El Rey Award at the 2018 Barcelona International Film Festival.

At home in Australia, it was nominated in the inaugural Best Indie Film category in the 2018 edition of the AACTA Awards, awarded by the Australian Academy of Cinema and Television Arts. Hill was nominated for Best Lead Actor, and Thom Neal for Best Cinematography.

It was also nominated for several other awards, including Best Direction of a Feature Film at the 2018 Australian Directors' Guild Awards; the Venice Horizons Award; Best Actor for Hill and Best Screenplay at the Australian Film Critics Association Awards;
