= Damian Hill =

Australian actor (c. 1976–2018)

- Born: c. 1976
- Died: 22 September 2018; Melbourne
- Education: Wesley College, Melbourne; Victorian College of the Arts
- Occupations: Actor, Writer
- Years active: 2003–2018
- Known for: Pawno (2015)

Damian Hill (c. 1976 – 2018) was an Australian film and television actor and screenwriter, best known for the 2015 film Pawno.

== Early life and education ==
Damian Hill was born in 1976 or 1975. His father, who was a surgeon, died when Damian was only a year old. His mother grew up in the inner-Melbourne suburb of Footscray, and Hill later moved there.

He attended both "fancy" private schools, including Wesley College, and public schools, and found himself liking working-class people.

After becoming a father at the age of 18, Quinn trained as an actor at the Victorian College of the Arts (VCA) in Melbourne.

He also did a masters degree in screenwriting at VCA.

== Career ==
After graduating, Hill travelled overseas for some time and worked in other countries, before returning to Melbourne and founding the Frank Theatre Company. He later said "I had a long 12 years' walkabout".

Hill acted on stage, including a production of Ray Mooney's prison drama, Everynight, Everynight, where he met Scottish actor Paul Ireland. This led to a collaboration on Hill's first feature film.

His first attempt at screenwriting was the film Pawno (2015), in which he also took the lead role. The film was highly praised by critics David Stratton and Margaret Pomeranz.

Hill played the lead role of Jimmy in 2018's West of Sunshine. His final appearances in feature films were in 2019 independent crime thriller Locusts with Jessica McNamee and Ben Geurens and Australian-French drama film Slam (2018).

Hill said in a 2015 interview: "I'm always attracted to the underdog, or the person who's got the rough deal". According to his brother, Hill "wanted to tell the stories of ordinary Australians, of working-class people – real stories, messy stories, uncomfortable stories, of forgiveness, reconciliation, redemption, stuffing-up".

== Awards and nominations ==
Year	Work	Award	Category	Result	Ref.
2016	Pawno	AACTA Awards	AACTA Award for Best Actor in a Leading Role	Nominated	
2016	Pawno	AACTA Awards	AACTA Award for Best Original Screenplay	Nominated	
2018	West of Sunshine	AACTA Awards	AACTA Award for Best Actor in a Leading Role	Nominated	

== Death and legacy ==
Hill died on 22 September 2018, having taken his own life two days before filming was due to start on the film Measure for Measure, which he co-wrote, co-directed, and in which he was going to star. The event shocked and traumatised all involved with the film, especially co-writer Paul Ireland and actor Mark Leonard Winter, who were close friends with Hill. Winter assumed Hill's role as the drug dealer Angelo in the film, and filming resumed a week later.

The Damian Hill Independent Film was awarded at the 2019 Melbourne International Film Festival in his honour.

The 2020 film Measure for Measure, which Hill contributed to writing, was dedicated to him.

One of the main themes of the 2023 film The Rooster, written and directed by Hill's close friend Mark Leonard Winter and starring Hugo Weaving, is men's mental health, with both of the men having been affected by Hill's death and having it in mind during writing and filming. Winter became very depressed after the death of his friend, and wrote the script for The Rooster while in this state, saying afterwards "I guess what I was trying to do was to create some meaning out of what is essentially a meaningless time, when you're so lost in a cloud of chemical imbalance".

== Personal life ==
Hill was the father of two children and stepfather of three. His stepson, Tyler (Ty) Perham had been with him since he was around four years of age, and featured in West of Sunshine with him, then aged 12. His partner of eight years was Beth, a graphic designer and former tattoo artist. Hill got his first tattoo aged 15 years and many more in ensuing years.

His brother is Australian Labor Party politician Julian Hill, Member of Parliament for Bruce.

== Filmography ==
=== Television ===
Year	Title	Role	Notes
2003	McLeod's Daughters	Mounted Police Officer	1 episode
2010	City Homicide	Dale Blunt	1 episode
2010	Rush	Dane Heinz	1 episode
2013	The Broken Shore	Vincent	TV movie
2014	Winners & Losers	Ant Richards	1 episode
2014	Neighbours	Stephen Montague	6 episodes
2016	Nowhere Boys	Stuart	3 episodes

=== Film ===
Year	Title	Role	Notes
2013	Model Behaviour	Roy Lambasto	
2014	Fell	Kelly	
2015	Pawno	Danny Williams	
2016	Broke	Lionel	
2016	The Death and Life of Otto Bloom	Bob	
2016	Spin Out	Spike	
2016	The Menkoff Method	Karaoke Operator	
2018	West of Sunshine	Jimmy	
2018	Slam	Shane	
2019	Locusts	Davo	
