= AACTA Award for Best Actor in a Leading Role =

Australian film and television award

AACTA Award Best Actor in a Leading Role
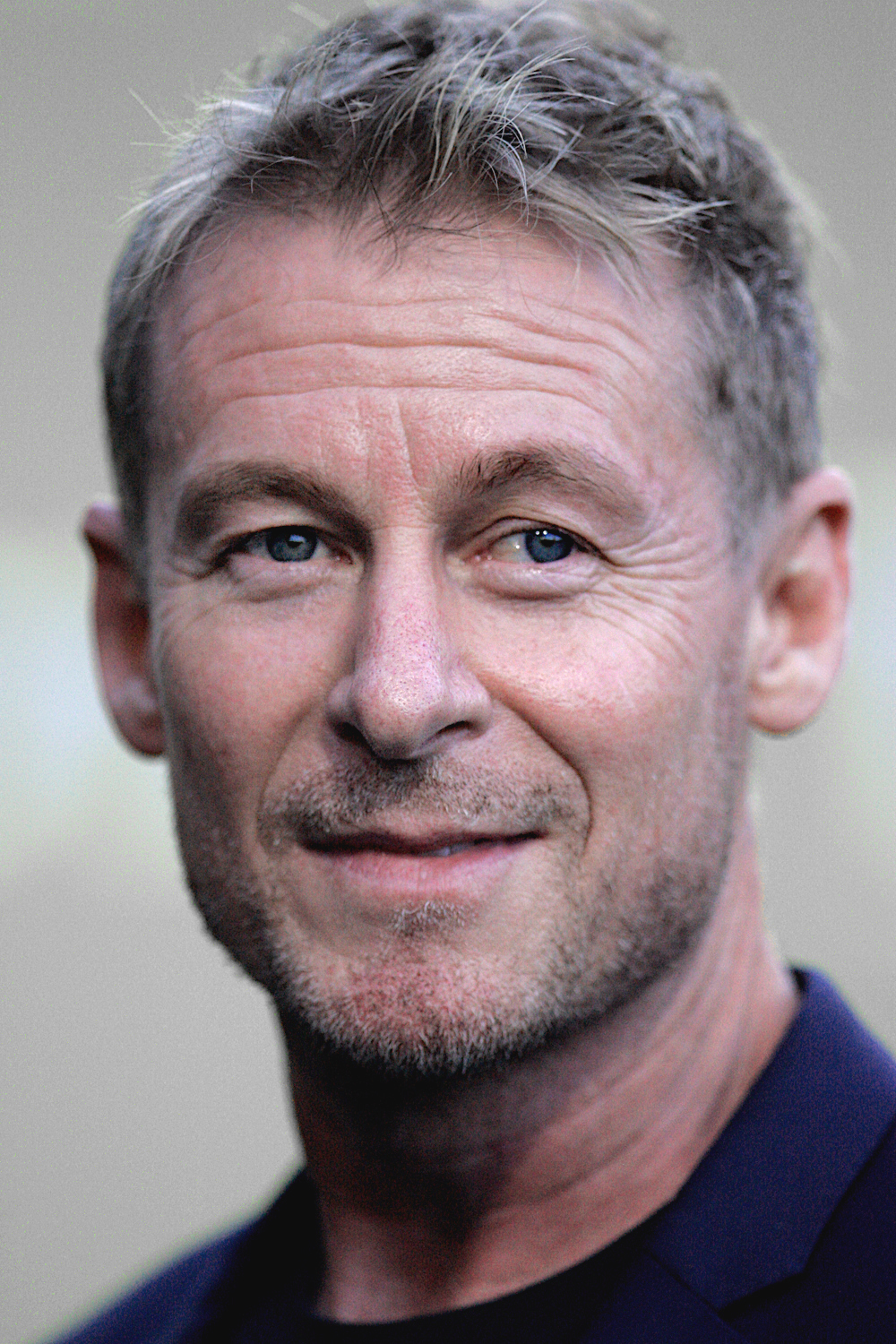
- The 2026 recipient: Richard Roxburgh
- Country: Australia
- Presented by: Australian Academy of Cinema and Television Arts (AACTA)
- First award: 1972
- Currently held by: Richard Roxburgh for The Correspondent (2026)
- Website: http://www.aacta.org

The AACTA Award for Best Actor in a Leading Role is an award presented by the Australian Academy of Cinema and Television Arts (AACTA), a non-profit organisation whose aim is to "identify, award, promote and celebrate Australia's greatest achievements in film and television." The award is presented at the annual AACTA Awards, which hand out accolades for achievements in feature film, television, documentaries and short films. From 1971 to 2010, the category was presented by the Australian Film Institute (AFI), the Academy's parent organisation, at the annual Australian Film Institute Awards (known as the AFI Awards). When the AFI launched the Academy in 2011, it changed the annual ceremony to the AACTA Awards, with the current award being a continuation of the AFI Award for Best Actor in a Leading Role.

From 1971 up until 1975, the awards for Best Actor and Best Actress were awarded in a single category for Best Performance. In 1971 the prize was given to Monica Maughan over fellow nominee Peter Cummins, who received a special mention for his performances in the films Some Regrets, The Hot Centre of the World (1971 short film), Bonjour Balwyn and Carson's Watermelons. From 1972 to 1975, the single award was handed out to the best actor and actress of the respective award giving years, with honourable mentions made to supporting casts. From 1976 to the present, the accolade has been handed out as a separate award for Best Actor in a Leading Role.

Candidates for this award must be human and male, and cannot be nominated for the same role in the supporting actor category.

== Winners and nominees ==
Year	Actor	Film	Role
1970s
1972	Bruce Spence	Stork	Graham 'Stork' Wallace
1973	Robert McDarra	27A	Bill
1974	N/A	N/A	N/A
1975	Jack Thompson	Sunday Too Far Away	Foley
1975	Martin Vaughan	Billy and Percy	Billy Hughes
1976	Simon Burke	The Devil's Playground	Tom Allen
1976	Nick Tate	The Devil's Playground	Brother Victor
1976	Arthur Dignam	The Devil's Playground	Brother Francine
1976	George Mallaby	End Play	Robert Gifford
1977	John Meillon	The Fourth Wish	Casey
1977	Noel Ferrier	Eliza Fraser	Captain James Fraser
1977	David Gulpilil	Storm Boy	Fingerbone Bill
1977	John Meillon	The Picture Show Man	Mr. Pym
1978	Bill Hunter	Newsfront	Len Maguire
1978	Richard Chamberlain	The Last Wave	David Burton
1978	Robert Helpmann	The Mango Tree	The Professor
1978	John Waters	Weekend of Shadows	Rabbit
1979	Mel Gibson	Tim	Tim Melville
1979	Alan Cassell	Cathy's Child	Dick Wordley
1979	Richard Moir	In Search of Anna	Tony
1979	Michael Preston	The Last of the Knucklemen	Pansy
1980s
1980	Jack Thompson	Breaker Morant	Capt. Alfred Taylor
1980	Bryan Brown	Stir	China Jackson
1980	Max Phipps	Stir	Norton
1980	Edward Woodward	Breaker Morant	Lt. Harry "Breaker" Morant
1981	Mel Gibson	Gallipoli	Frank Dunne
1981	John Hargreaves	Hoodwink	Martin Stang
1981	Graham Kennedy	The Club	Ted Parker
1981	Mark Lee	Gallipoli	Archy Hamilton
1982	Ray Barrett	Goodbye Paradise	Michael Stacy
1982	Vince Colosimo	Moving Out	Gino
1982	Norman Kaye	Lonely Hearts	Peter Thompson
1982	William Henry Kerr	Dusty	Tom Lincoln
1983	Norman Kaye	Man of Flowers	Charles Bremer
1983	Mel Gibson	The Year of Living Dangerously	Guy Hamilton
1983	Nicholas Gledhill	Careful, He Might Hear You	PS
1983	Martin Vaughan	Phar Lap	Harry Telford
1984	John Hargreaves	My First Wife	John
1984	Drew Forsythe	Annie's Coming Out	David
1984	Chris Haywood	Strikebound	Wattie Doig
1984	Ivar Kants	Silver City	Julian
1985	Chris Haywood	A Street to Die	Colin Turner
1985	John Clayton	Unfinished Business	Geoff
1985	Richard Moir	An Indecent Obsession	Luce Daggett
1985	Barry Otto	Bliss	Harry Joy
1986	Colin Friels	Malcolm	Malcolm Hughes
1986	Reb Brown	Death of a Soldier	Pvt. Edward J. Leonski
1986	Robert Menzies	Cactus	Robert
1986	Barry Otto	The More Things Change...	Lex
1987	Leo McKern	Travelling North	Frank
1987	Bryan Brown	The Umbrella Woman	Sonny Hills
1987	Colin Friels	Ground Zero	Harvey Denton
1987	Noah Taylor	The Year My Voice Broke	Danny
1988	John Waters	Boulevard of Broken Dreams	Tom Garfield
1988	Mark Lee	The Everlasting Secret Family	Youth
1988	Hamish McFarlane	The Navigator: A Medieval Odyssey	Griffin
1988	Sean Scully	Phobia	David Simmons
1989	Sam Neill	Evil Angels	Michael Chamberlain
1989	Mike Bishop	Ghosts... of the Civil Dead	David Yale
1989	John Hargreaves	Emerald City	Colin
1989	Chris Haywood	Island	Janis
1990s
1990	Max von Sydow	Father	Joe Muller
1990	Russell Crowe	The Crossing	Johnny
1990	Frankie J. Holden	Return Home	Steve
1990	Ben Mendelsohn	The Big Steal	Danny Clark
1991	Hugo Weaving	Proof	Martin
1991	Colin Friels	Dingo	John Anderson
1991	Ben Mendelsohn	Spotswood	Carey
1991	Sam Neill	Death in Brunswick	Carl Fitzgerald
1992	Russell Crowe	Romper Stomper	Hando
1992	Lothaire Bluteau	Black Robe	LaForgue
1992	Bruno Ganz	The Last Days of Chez Nous	JP
1992	Paul Mercurio	Strictly Ballroom	Scott Hastings
1993	Harvey Keitel	The Piano	George Baines
1993	Matthew Ferguson	On My Own	Simon Henderson
1993	Anthony LaPaglia	The Custodian	Det. Sgt. James Quinlan
1993	John Moore	Blackfellas	Doug Dooligan
1994	Nicholas Hope	Bad Boy Bubby	Bubby
1994	John Hargreaves	Country Life	Jack Dickens
1994	Terence Stamp	The Adventures of Priscilla, Queen of the Desert	Ralph Waite/Bernadette Bassinger
1994	Hugo Weaving	The Adventures of Priscilla, Queen of the Desert	Anthony "Tick" Belrose/Mitzi Del Bra
1995	John Lynch	Angel Baby	Harry
1995	John Jarratt	All Men Are Liars	Barry
1995	John Moore	The Life of Harry Dare	Harry Dare
1995	Aden Young	Metal Skin	Joe
1996	Geoffrey Rush	Shine	Adult David Helfgott
1996	John Brumpton	Life	Des
1996	Noah Taylor	Shine	Adolescent David Helfgott
1996	Aden Young	River Street	Ben Egan
1997	Richard Roxburgh	Doing Time for Patsy Cline	Boyd
1997	Michael Caton	The Castle	Darryl Kerrigan
1997	Matt Day	Kiss or Kill	Al Fletcher
1997	Jeremy Sims	Idiot Box	Mick
1998	Hugo Weaving	The Interview	Eddie Rodney Fleming
1998	Ray Barrett	In the Winter Dark	Maurice Stubbs
1998	Alex Dimitriades	Head On	Ari
1998	David Wenham	The Boys	Brett Sprague
1999	Russell Dykstra	Soft Fruit	Bo
1999	Hugh Jackman	Erskineville Kings	Wace
1999	Heath Ledger	Two Hands	Jimmy
1999	Richard Roxburgh	Passion	Percy Grainger
2000s
2000	Eric Bana	Chopper	Mark "Chopper" Read
2000	Steve Bastoni	15 Amore	Alfredo
2000	David Wenham	Better Than Sex	Josh
2000	Sam Worthington	Bootmen	Mitchell Okden
2001	Anthony LaPaglia	Lantana	Leon Zat
2001	Ewan McGregor	Moulin Rouge!	Christian
2001	Ben Mendelsohn	Mullet	Eddie 'Mullet' Maloney
2001	David Wenham	The Bank	Jim Doyle
2002	David Gulpilil	The Tracker	The Tracker
2002	Vince Colosimo	Walking on Water	Charlie
2002	Geoffrey Rush	Swimming Upstream	Harold Fingleton
2002	David Wenham	Molokai	Father Damien
2003	David Wenham	Gettin' Square	Johnny Francis 'Spit' Spitieri
2003	Heath Ledger	Ned Kelly	Ned Kelly
2003	Timothy Spall	Gettin' Square	Darren 'Dabba' Barrington
2003	Gotaro Tsunashima	Japanese Story	Hiromitsu Tachibana
2004	Sam Worthington	Somersault	Joe
2004	Colin Friels	Tom White	Tom White
2004	Kevin Harrington	The Honourable Wally Norman	Wally Norman
2004	Dan Spielman	One Perfect Day	Tommy Matisse
2005	Hugo Weaving	Little Fish	Lionel Dawson
2005	William McInnes	Look Both Ways	Nick
2005	Guy Pearce	The Proposition	Charlie Burns
2005	Ray Winstone	The Proposition	Captain Morris Stanley
2006	Shane Jacobson	Kenny	Kenny Smyth
2006	Gabriel Byrne	Jindabyne	Stewart
2006	Heath Ledger	Candy	Dan
2006	Steve Le Marquand	Last Train to Freo	The tall thug
2007	Eric Bana	Romulus, My Father	Romulus
2007	Brendan Cowell	Noise	Graham McGahan
2007	Joel Lok	The Home Song Stories	Tom
2007	Kodi Smit-McPhee	Romulus, My Father	Raimond
2008	William McInnes	Unfinished Sky	John Woldring
2008	Guy Pearce	Death Defying Acts	Harry Houdini
2008	David Roberts	The Square	Raymond Yale
2008	Rhys Wakefield	The Black Balloon	Thomas Mollison
2009	Anthony LaPaglia	Balibo	Roger East
2009	Rowan McNamara	Samson and Delilah	Samson
2009	Ben Mendelsohn	Beautiful Kate	Ned Kendall
2009	Hugo Weaving	Last Ride	Kev
2010s
2010	Ben Mendelsohn	Animal Kingdom	Andrew 'Pope' Cody
2010	Brendan Cowell	Beneath Hill 60	Oliver Woodward
2010	James Frecheville	Animal Kingdom	Joshua 'J' Cody
2010	Clive Owen	The Boys Are Back	Joe Warr
AACTA Awards
2011 (1st)	Daniel Henshall	Snowtown	John Bunting
2011 (1st)	Willem Dafoe	The Hunter	Martin David
2011 (1st)	Geoffrey Rush	The Eye of the Storm	Basil Hunter
2011 (1st)	David Wenham	Oranges and Sunshine	Len
2012 (2nd)	Chris O'Dowd	The Sapphires	Dave Lovelace
2012 (2nd)	Joel Edgerton	Wish You Were Here	Dave Flannery
2012 (2nd)	Matthew Goode	Burning Man	Tom
2012 (2nd)	Guy Pearce	33 Postcards	Dean Randall
2013 (3rd)	Leonardo DiCaprio	The Great Gatsby	Jay Gatsby
2013 (3rd)	Sitthiphon Disamoe	The Rocket	Ahlo
2013 (3rd)	Ewen Leslie	Dead Europe	Isaac
2013 (3rd)	Hugo Weaving	The Turning	Bob Lang
2014 (4th)	David Gulpilil	Charlie's Country	Charlie
2014 (4th)	Russell Crowe	The Water Diviner	Joshua Connor
2014 (4th)	Damon Herriman	The Little Death	Dan
2014 (4th)	Guy Pearce	The Rover	Eric
2015 (5th)	Michael Caton	Last Cab to Darwin	Rex
2015 (5th)	Patrick Brammall	Ruben Guthrie	Ruben Guthrie
2015 (5th)	Ryan Corr	Holding the Man	Timothy Conigrave
2015 (5th)	Sullivan Stapleton	Cut Snake	Pommie
2016 (6th)	Andrew Garfield	Hacksaw Ridge	Desmond Doss
2016 (6th)	John Brumpton	Pawno	Les Underwood
2016 (6th)	Damian Hill	Pawno	Danny Williamson
2016 (6th)	Ewen Leslie	The Daughter	Oliver
2017 (7th)	Sunny Pawar	Lion	Young Saroo Brierley
2017 (7th)	Stephen Curry	Hounds of Love	John White
2017 (7th)	Ewen Leslie	The Butterfly Tree	Al
2017 (7th)	Osamah Sami	Ali's Wedding	Ali
2018 (8th)
2018 (8th)	Hamilton Morris	Sweet Country	Sam Kelly
2018 (8th)	Ryan Corr	1%	President Paddo
2018 (8th)	Lucas Hedges	Boy Erased	Jared Eamons
2018 (8th)	Damian Hill	West of Sunshine	Jim
2018 (8th)	Daniel Monks	Pulse	Olly
2019 (9th)	Damon Herriman	Judy and Punch	Punch
2019 (9th)	Timothée Chalamet	The King	King Henry V
2019 (9th)	Baykali Ganambarr	The Nightingale	"Billy" Mangala
2019 (9th)	Dev Patel	Hotel Mumbai	Arjun
2019 (9th)	Hugo Weaving	Hearts and Bones	Dan Fisher
2020s
2020 (10th)	Toby Wallace	Babyteeth	Moses
2020 (10th)	George MacKay	True History of the Kelly Gang	Ned Kelly
2020 (10th)	Sam Neill	Rams	Colin
2020 (10th)	Richard Roxburgh	H is for Happiness	Jim Phee
2020 (10th)	Hugo Weaving	Measure for Measure	Duke
2021 (11th)	Caleb Landry Jones	Nitram	Nitram
2021 (11th)	Simon Baker	High Ground	Travis
2021 (11th)	Eric Bana	The Dry	Aaron Falk
2021 (11th)	Ahmed Malek	The Furnace	Hanif
2021 (11th)	Jacob Junior Nayinggul	High Ground	Gutjuk
2022 (12th)	Austin Butler	Elvis	Elvis Presley
2022 (12th)	Rob Collins	The Drover's Wife: The Legend of Molly Johnson	Yadaka
2022 (12th)	Joel Edgerton	The Stranger	Mark Frame
2022 (12th)	Idris Elba	Three Thousand Years of Longing	The Djinn
2022 (12th)	Damon Herriman	Nude Tuesday	Bruno
2023 (13th)	Aswan Reid	The New Boy	New Boy
2023 (13th)	Elias Anton	Of an Age	Nikola 'Kol' Denic
2023 (13th)	Simon Baker	Limbo	Travis Hurley
2023 (13th)	Thom Green	Of an Age	Adam Donegal
2023 (13th)	Phoenix Raei	The Rooster	Dan
2023 (13th)	Osamah Sami	Shayda	Hossein
2024 (14th)	Jonno Davies	Better Man	Robbie Williams
2024 (14th)	Eric Bana	Force of Nature: The Dry 2	Aaron Falk
2024 (14th)	David Dastmalchian	Late Night with the Devil	Jack Delroy
2024 (14th)	Daniel Henshall	How to Make Gravy	Joe
2024 (14th)	Guy Pearce	The Convert	Thomas Munro
2024 (14th)	Kodi Smit-McPhee	Memoir of a Snail	Gilbert Pudel
2025 (15th)	Richard Roxburgh	The Correspondent	Peter Greste
2025 (15th)	Bryan Brown	The Travellers	Fred
2025 (15th)	Ryan Corr	Kangaroo	Chris Masterman
2025 (15th)	Jai Courtney	Dangerous Animals	Tucker
2025 (15th)	Guy Pearce	Inside	Warren
2025 (15th)	David Wenham	Spit	Johnny "Spit" Spitieri
