= Kenneth Moraleda =

American actor

- Born: 17 April 1973 (age 53); Cambridge, Massachusetts, United States
- Education: Australian Theatre for Young People; National Institute of Dramatic Art (1995)
- Occupations: Actor, Director
- Known for: Lucky Miles (2007)

Kenneth Moraleda (born 17 April 1973) is a Filipino-American actor, based in Australia.

== Early life ==
Of Filipino descent, Moraleda was born in Cambridge, Massachusetts, and has lived in Seattle, the Philippines, Los Angeles and is now based in Sydney, Australia.

Moraleda trained at Australian Theatre for Young People (ATYP), before being accepted into the prestigious National Institute of Dramatic Art (NIDA), graduating with a Bachelor of Acting in 1995.

== Career ==
Moraleda's first lead in a feature film was the role of Arun in Lucky Miles (2007), directed by Michael James Rowland. His portrayal won him the Vic Silayan Award for Best Actor at the 10th Cinemanila International Film Festival in 2008. He played Monsod in Miramax's Australian-American war film The Great Raid (2005), Heng in Dead Europe and Aristotle Chen in Locusts (2019). He played Tony in the short film Sweet and Sour and had lead roles in the shorts Perfection, The Fence, Banana Boy and Legacy.

Moraleda's numerous television appearances include playing Michael Lee in New Zealand soap opera City Life and Tim Young in the SBS seven-part series Bondi Banquet in 2000. He appeared in the second season of SBS drama East West 101 and in a 4-episode storyline in season three of ABC drama Janet King. He played the role of Winata in Channel 9′s 2014 biographical TV movie Schapelle and had a recurring guest role in the second season of The Bureau of Magical Things. Most recently, he had a lead role in ABC 2022 mystery drama miniseries Significant Others, alongside Jacqueline McKenzie.

His television guest credits include Water Rats, Wildside, White Collar Blue, Jay's Jungle, City Homicide, Stingers, Wolf Like Me and Strife. He also portrayed various characters in Comedy Inc. and had a presenting role on Playhouse Disney.

Notable acting credits for stage include creating the role of Roger Chan in Nick Enright's A Man With Five Children for the Sydney Theatre Company and playing Banzai in the Australian/Asian tour of Disney's The Lion King.

Moraleda was a Resident Artist with Sydney Theatre Company from 2018 to 2020, before becoming Resident Director, with productions including 4000 Miles, American Signs, A Fool in Love, and Rough Draft #48: Hubris and Humiliation. He has also directed for Griffin Theatre Company, Queensland Theatre Company, Belvoir and NIDA.

== Filmography ==
=== Film ===
Year	Title	Role	Notes
	Sweet & Sour	Tony	Short film
2000	Sample People	Jake	Feature film
2005	The Great Raid	Monsod	Feature film
2007	Lucky Miles	Arun	Feature film
	The Strand	Nanao	Short film
2012	Dead Europe	Heng	Feature film
	Perfection	Mr Smith	Short film
	The Fence	Virak	Short film
	Legacy	Richmond	Short film
	Banana Boy	Guard	Short film
2019	Locusts	Aristotle Chen	Feature film
2023	Christmess	The Doctor	Feature film
	Interview with a Hero	Chhay	Short film

=== Television ===
Year	Title	Role	Notes
	Manic Times	Various roles	
	English at Work	Henry	
	City Life	Michael Lee	
	Get a Life	Dave O’Chee	
	Wildside	Tinzaw Nanda	
	Water Rats	Kevin Gilbert	
	Big Sky	Ramon	
2000	Bondi Banquet	Tim Young	Miniseries
	Stingers	Tran	
	Playhouse	Disney Presenter	
	Outriders	Kitchen Hand	
	White Collar Blue	Edward Lam	
	Comedy Inc.	Various roles	
	Alfred Wallace	Ali	
	Mystery ER	Dr Walker	
	East West 101	Zacharriah Noor	
	City Homicide	Muhammad Hartono	
2014	Schapelle	Winata	TV movie
2015	Maximum Choppage	Rizaldo Mendoza	
	Avalon Now	$2 shop man	Web series
	Janet King	Eddie Cooke	Season 3
	Bent 101	Neighbour	Web series
	The Family Law	Dong	Miniseries
2018–	The Bureau of Magical Things	Mr Mendoza	Seasons 1 & 2
2022	Significant Others	Den	Miniseries
2022	Wolf Like Me	Suppakorn	
2023	Strife	Benja	

== Awards ==
Year	Work	Award	Category	Result	Ref.
2008	Lucky Miles	Cinemanila International Film Festival	Vic Silayan Award for Best Actor	Won	
2007	Lucky Miles	Sydney Film Festival	Audience Award	Won	
2022	One Hour No Oil	Sydney Theatre Awards	Best Director in an Independent Production	Nominated	
2023	Significant Others	Equity Ensemble Awards	Outstanding Performance by an Ensemble in a Miniseries or Telemovie	Won	
