= The Combination (film) =

- Theatrical release poster
- Directed by: David Field
- Written by: George Basha
- Produced by: John Perrie
- Starring: George Basha; Firass Dirani; Clare Bowen; Vaughn White; Michael Denkha; Doris Younane
- Cinematography: Toby Oliver
- Edited by: Ken Sallows
- Music by: Labib Jammal
- Distributed by: Australian Film Syndicate
- Release date: 26 February 2009
- Running time: 96 minutes
- Country: Australia
- Language: English
- Budget: A$1.7 million
- Box office: A$2,742,355 (Australia)

The Combination is a 2009 Australian drama film, directed by David Field and written by George Basha. The film covers the relations between Lebanese Australians and Anglo Australians in parts of Western Sydney. Parts of the film focus on the 2005 Cronulla riots in Australia between Lebanese Australians and Anglo Australians.

Basha and Field met and began working on the screenplay in 2001. Principal photography began in 2008, taking place in and around the Sydney suburbs of Guildford and Parramatta. The film was released on 26 February 2009. It received generally positive reviews from critics. It also caused some controversy after two violent incidents caused the film to be temporarily withdrawn from some cinemas.

A sequel, The Combination: Redemption, was released on 7 February 2019.

== Plot ==
In 2005, after serving time in jail, Lebanese Australian John Morkos returns home. He finds work as a cleaner at a boxing gym, owned by an Aboriginal man. John also meets and begins a relationship with Sydney, an Anglo Australian after saving her from being assaulted by two men. John soon finds that his younger brother, Charlie, has been involved in fights between his Lebanese friends and the white students at school. Fearing that Charlie is going down the path he has been on, John tries to talk some sense into Charlie.

Charlie ignores John's warnings and with his friend Zeus start selling methamphetamines for Ibo, the local drug kingpin. Not long after that, another one of Charlie's friends, Tom, punches a stranger in the head, after playing and losing an arcade game to him. The stranger's friend gets involved in the fight and later on Tom's friends join in. The stranger's friend holds Zeus in a headlock during the fight and while doing so Tom stabs him with a knife to break Zeus free from the headlock and ends up in jail. At school, tensions between the Lebanese and Anglo boys increase. The Anglos, led by Scott, gang-bash one of the Lebanese boys, breaking his jaw and nose. The rest of the Lebanese boys decide to take revenge on Scott but are persuaded by John not to do anything, but Zeus ignores his warnings to later confront Scott at a nightclub.

Meanwhile, the relationship between John and Sydney blossoms but ends when Sydney's racist mother threatens to kick her out of the house if she doesn't stop seeing John. The two have a fight, with John unwilling to tell Sydney of his past life. The couple soon make up after realising they both made a mistake. John also finds Charlie's stash of drugs and flushes it down the toilet. At a nightclub, Zeus starts a fight with Scott, punches him in the head and ends up shooting and killing him despite Charlie's attempts to dissuade him. Zeus is arrested by the police. Unable to come up with the drug money for Ibo, a drive-by shooting is carried out on the Morkos home by Ibo. John turns to the owner of the boxing gym for the money which he delivers to Ibo, but Charlie is murdered by Ibo with a shotgun when walking home from school. John avenges Charlie's death by savagely beating Ibo, and in the process, nearly killing him. John decides to leave Ibo's fate to Ibo's neighbours, who also hate the drug dealer, and returns home to his family and a pregnant Sydney.

== Cast ==
- George Basha as John, a Lebanese Australian man just out of jail
- Firass Dirani as Charlie, John's younger brother
- Doris Younane as Mary, John and Charlie's mother
- Clare Bowen as Sydney, John's girlfriend
- Michael Denkha as Ibo, a drug dealer
- Vaughn White as Scott, the leader of the Anglo boys
- Katrina Risteska as Anna, Scott's girlfriend and Charlie's love interest
- Ali Haider as Zeus, one of Charlie's friends
- Rasheed Dehan as Tom, one of Charlie's friends
- Guang Li as Nipper, one of Charlie's friends
- John Brumpton as Mr. Roberts, Sydney's father
- Ruth McGowan as Mrs. Roberts, Sydney's mother
- Rahel Romahn as Mo
- Daniel Webber as Jason

== Production ==
The film is based partly on writer George Basha's life experiences of growing up in the suburbs surrounding Guildford and Parramatta. Basha wrote the script while recovering from a broken leg he got while playing soccer. Basha met David Field in late 2001 after the director sold a second-hand car to a friend of Basha's. The two met for lunch where Basha showed Field his script. Within two days, Field decided he would direct the film himself.

Field originally did not want Basha to star in the film, but Basha auditioned for the role of John Morkos and won the part. Clare Bowen, who was a student in an acting class Field previously taught, was called by Field to audition for the role of Sydney after he was unable to find the right actress for the part. The film also features a group of non-professional actors. For the roles of Charlie's high school mates, the producers place an ad in the Parramatta papers. Field says "it wasn't about using non-actors, it was about using actors who'd been waiting for the opportunity to act." Vaughn White, who plays Scott, was found while mowing lawns for community service.

The film was made on a A$1.7 million budget and without any government funding. After the finance was raised the film began production in early 2008. The film was shot in 21 days following a two-week rehearsal period. It was shot on a Red One digital film camera in and around Parramatta and Guildford. Influenced by the visual style of films in the Revisionist Western genre, the film makes use of the widescreen format, low angles and dramatic lighting to "enhance [the] hero's standing among those less honourable" and allow "dynamic compositions of landscape and character." It was edited in Final Cut Pro before being graded in the digital intermediate process.

== Reception ==
The film generally received positive reviews upon its release. At the Movies critics David Stratton and Margaret Pomeranz gave the film 4 and 4½ out of 5 stars, respectively. Stratton said "the story it tells is so moving and so honest". Time Off's Adam Brunes said that it was "refreshing to see a homegrown film that doesn't resort to cultural stereotypes, and a film about race that doesn't preach." ABC Radio National's Jason Di Rosso said that the film had "some clunky, overwritten dialogue and poor pacing" but that "as the plot crescendos […] The Combination transcends its flaws." Marc Fennell reviewing for Triple J gave the film two out of five stars, praising the ambition of the film, but criticizing several aspects including the love story, the acting by the non-professional cast and Bowen, Labib Jammal's music and the characterisation of Sydney's parents. The acting by the cast of young actors received praise, as did Toby Oliver's cinematography.

The film was temporarily pulled from Greater Union cinemas in New South Wales after two violent incidents in the film's opening week. In the first incident on 26 February 2009, a security guard was hit in the head and hospitalised after asking a patron to put out his cigarette. In the second incident on 28 February, a staff member was injured in a fight that broke out after patrons asked other patrons to be quiet towards the end of the film. The film was reopened at the cinemas on 4 March 2009 following the addition of extra security measures.

== Sequel ==
A sequel titled The Combination: Redemption was released on 7 February 2019. The film was also written by Basha and directed by Field, with Basha reprising his role as John Morkos. The sequel takes place six years after the original film.

== See also ==
- Cinema of Australia
