= Lucky Miles =

- Directed by: Michael James Rowland
- Written by: Michael James Rowland; Helen Barnes
- Produced by: Jo Dyer; Lesley Dyer
- Starring: Kenneth Moraleda; Rodney Afif
- Edited by: Henry Dangar
- Music by: Trilok Gurtu
- Distributed by: Dendy Films (Australian); Cineclick Asia (international)
- Release date: 2007
- Running time: 105 minutes
- Country: Australia
- Language: English

Lucky Miles is a 2007 Australian drama feature film based on several true stories involving people entering Western Australia by boat in order to seek asylum.

== Synopsis ==
In 1990, an Indonesian fishing boat drops a group of male Iraqi and Cambodian refugees on the West Australian coast, telling them there is a bus stop over the hill from which they will be able to go to Perth. They soon realise that there is no bus stop, and that they are in fact a remote desert area far from any road, town or city. Most of the group find their way to a small town pub, and are rounded up by local police. A group of three men, a Cambodian, an Arab, and one of the Indonesian fisherman, are left to their own devices. They begin a journey through the desert, completely disoriented and attempting to reach either Perth or Broome. Meanwhile a group of Army Reservists, including two Indigenous Australian men, are attempting to track them in a Land Rover.

== Cast ==
- Kenneth Moraleda as Arun
- Rodney Afif as Youssif
- Sri Sacdpreseuth as Ramelan
- Don Hany as Plank
- Glenn Shea as O'Shane
- Sean Mununggurr as Tom
- Sawung Jabo as Muluk
- Arif Hidayat as Abdu
- Deborah Mailman as Lisa
- Majid Shokor as Salah
- Osamah Sami as Fiark
- Edwin Hodgeman as Coote
- Gillian Jones as Chris
- Gerard Kennedy as Shooter
- Geoff Morrell as Peter Coode
- Lillian Crombie as Evie
- Daniel Wyllie as Policeman #2

== Production ==
Shot mostly on location in South Australia, Lucky Miles is the feature debut from Adelaide-born Michael James Rowland.

The film was produced by Jo Dyer and Lesley Dyer for Short of Easy. It was co-written by Helen Barnes, shot by cinematographer Geoff Burton, edited by Henry Dangar, scored by Trilok Gurtu and executive produced by Michael Bourchier.

== Release ==
Lucky Miles premiered on 22 February 2007 at the opening night of the 2007 Adelaide Film Festival. It also screened at numerous world cinema festivals, including Jerusalem Film Festival, Saint-Tropez Antipodean Film Festival, Pacific Meridian, Amazonas Film Festival, Chicago International Film Festival, Tokyo International Film Festival, AFI Fest, Philadelphia International Film Festival and Taipei International Film Festival.

Lucky Miles opened in Australian cinemas nationally on 19 July 2007 and was released internationally that same year. CineClick Asia was the film's international distribution company.

The film was distributed on DVD by Madman Entertainment, released on 7 December 2007.

== Reception ==
Film critic Margaret Pomeranz from At the Movies gave the film four stars, saying: "A bitter-sweet comedy was a daring approach by first time feature director, Michael James Rowland, to a phenomenon that many Australians take very seriously" and "the performances from a group of relative unknowns ground the film in reality, although possibly the characters themselves could have been more interestingly developed. But Lucky Miles is a brave attempt to look at some of the issues facing the world today and present them in an entertaining yet thoughtful manner."

Michael Adams from Empire Magazine gave the film give stars and described it as "a real-crowd pleaser, that deserves a wide audience ... a rollicking adventure." Richard Kuipers from Variety magazine said: "With a winning streak of wry humor and a proudly humanist outlook, Lucky Miles throws refugees, people smugglers and border-patrol soldiers into the outback and emerges with entertaining and gently thought-provoking results."

Philippa Hawker from The Age said: "It is a poignant film, but it is above all a comedy of errors: a political film, without a doubt, but a subtle, oblique and entertaining one." Julian Shaw from FilmInk considered it "a joyous film… Despite its hot-button subject matter, the approach from first time writer-director Michael James Rowland always remains surprisingly gentle and amiable."

== Box office ==
Lucky Miles grossed $678,110 at the box office in Australia.

== Accolades ==
Award	Category	Result	Ref
Sydney Film Festival	Audience Award for Best Film	Won	
42nd Karlovy Vary International Film Festival	Special Jury Prize	Won	
Vladivostok International Film Festival	Best Screenplay	Won	
Middle East International Film Festival	Black Pearl for Best New Director	Won	
Rencontres Internationales du Cinéma des Antipodes (St Tropez)	Grand Prix	Won	
Asian Festival of First Films (Singapore)	Best Film	Nominated	
Asia Pacific Screen Awards	Best Screenplay	Nominated	
Australian Film Institute Awards	Best Film	Nominated	
Australian Film Institute Awards	Best Screenplay	Nominated	
IF Awards	Best Film	Nominated	
IF Awards	Best Screenplay	Nominated	

== See also ==
- Cinema of Australia
