= Storm Warning (2007 film) =

- Theatrical poster art
- Directed by: Jamie Blanks
- Written by: Everett De Roche
- Produced by: Gary Hamilton
- Starring: Nadia Farès; Robert Taylor; John Brumpton; David Lyons; Mathew Wilkinson
- Cinematography: Karl von Möller
- Edited by: Jamie Blanks; Geoff Hitchins
- Music by: Jamie Blanks
- Production companies: Film Finance Corporation Australia; Film Victoria; Darclight Films
- Distributed by: Dimension Films; Genius Products
- Release dates: 25 August 2007 (London Frightfest); 19 October 2007 (Screamfest)
- Running time: 82 minutes (theatrical): 86 minutes (unrated)
- Country: Australia
- Language: English

Storm Warning is a 2007 Australian horror film directed by Jamie Blanks and starring Nadia Farès and Robert Taylor.

== Plot ==
Australian lawyer Rob and his beautiful French artist wife Pia spend the day sailing in Western Port, Victoria, perhaps in celebration of her pregnancy of two months. They decide to investigate a gap in the mangroves, which turns out to be a channel, which they follow. The tide turns and they are forced to abandon the dinghy and as night falls head for a distant light, which can only be a farmhouse. Unknowingly, they are somewhere in French Island, a low-lying island with very few inhabitants. Walking cross-country, they come to a desolate road, where a man is being beaten by an unseen assailant next to a parked truck. They flee, and stumble upon a decrepit farmhouse just as a torrential rainstorm begins. In a shed on the property, Rob uncovers a large amount of marijuana growing.

Rob and Pia are interrupted when the deranged, redneck owners of the home—Brett, his half-brother Jimmy, and their father Poppy—return, in the truck the couple saw earlier. The brothers, who perceive Rob and Pia as upper-class yuppies, offer them a shower during which they steal their wetsuits. When Rob asks for them back, they begin to insult them. At the dinner table, they taunt Rob for driving a Volvo, and sexually harass Pia, revealing her probable future as their father's sex slave. Their intimidation tactics quickly escalate, as Brett threatens to castrate Rob unless Pia kills a joey for their dinner, which she reluctantly does. Rob and Pia attempt to flee, but are subdued, Brett breaking Rob's leg in the melee. The couple are locked in the barn, Poppy's hunting dog, Honkey, prowling outside ...

".. once he chomps down and them big jaws lock on, he don't let up till the job's finished."

Pia improvises a splint for Rob's leg and single-handedly (as Rob, incapacitated, lays in a corner) fashions a booby trap with ropes and fishing equipment found inside the barn. She fabricates an anti-rape device, to be worn internally, from a glass jar with the lid cut inward, leaving jagged edges. Rob protests but Pia is adamant. Brett re-enters and Rob triggers the booby-trap. Hooks lodge in Brett's face and lift him into the air, after which Pia kills him by beating his head in. Jimmy comes looking for Brett, who is nowhere to be seen, before forcing Pia into the house and sends her upstairs where Poppy has his bedroom. When Poppy penetrates her, his member is jammed in the device. Pia flees into a crawlspace, where she falls through the floor, landing a downstairs room. Jimmy pursues her with a rifle to the barn, where she and Rob hide. Jimmy enters the barn and fires his shotgun into a wardrobe, which proves to be not the couple's hiding-place but that of Brett's body. Rob and Pia escape the barn, locking Jimmy inside.

They make it to the family's truck but can find no keys. Pia re-enters the house, determined to find the keys and is momentarily confronted by Poppy who had made it downstairs, still trouserless and bleeding. She runs back to the truck with the keys. They attempt to drive away but Poppy makes it from the house across the yard towards them. The blood from his wounds attracts Honkey, who latches onto his groin. Jimmy attempts to chase the truck with an airboat stored inside the barn but Pia, enraged, drives at him, throwing him into the propeller which shreds his body to pieces. The couple then drive away.

== Cast ==
- Nadia Farès as Pia
- Robert Taylor as Rob
- John Brumpton as Poppy
- David Lyons as Jimmy
- Mathew Wilkinson as Brett

== Production ==
The script was written by Everett De Roche in the late 1980s or early 1990s and it was sent to director Jamie Blanks in 2005 by Darclight Films' Gary Hamilton. The film was produced by Hamilton and Pete Ford for Darclight Films and Resolution Independent with executive producers Greg Sitch, Martin Fabinyi, Michael Gudinski and Mark Pennell. Cinematography was headed by Karl von Möller.

Blanks soon cast French actress Nadia Farès in the lead role of Pia; however, he had more difficulty in finding Australian actors to portray either Rob or Poppy. Eventually he acquired Robert Taylor (Rob) and John Brumpton (Poppy). Blanks praised the efforts of David Lyons as Jimmy and Mathew Wilkinson as Brett.

== Release ==
The film premiered in the UK at London Frightfest on 25 August 2007, and had its US premiere at the Screamfest in Los Angeles on 19 October 2007.

=== Home media ===
Dimension Extreme released an unrated version of Storm Warning on 5 February 2008. The DVD contains an audio commentary by director Jamie Blanks, screenwriter Everett De Roche, actor Robert Taylor, cinematographer Karl von Möller, production designer Robby Perkins, and special FX artist Justin Dix, and a making-of featurette. The DVD was released in Australia on 5 June 2008.

== Reception ==
=== Critical reception ===
Jason Buchanan from Allmovie gave the film a negative review, stating that the film didn't bring anything new to the genre and criticised the film's lack of originality. Sean DeArmond from Horror News.net gave the film a mixed review, complimenting the film's acting, but criticised the film's runtime, lack of likable lead characters, and overuse of cloud shots. In his review, DeArmond concluded, "the movie does what it sets out to do. The content is cringe worthy and often unnerving, but it never drops the ball it has chosen to carry. If it sounds like your thing, have at it. We, however, are going to put in a light comedy to decompress."

=== Accolades ===
Justin Dix won the Screamfest Festival Trophy for Best Special Effects.
