= Mathew Wilkinson =

Australian actor

- Born: Mathew Ronald Wilkinson; 11 September 1976 (age 49); Australia
- Occupation: Actor

Mathew Wilkinson (born 9 November 1976) is an Australian film and television actor.

== Early life ==
Wilkinson was born in Parramatta, New South Wales and spent quite a few years growing up in Campbelltown.

After performing two songs on stage on the Gold Coast in 1994, Wilkinson decided to pursue acting, training at the Australian Film and Television Academy in Queensland in 1996.

== Career ==
Wilkinson's career began with substantial roles in television series Wildside and Head Start.

Following this, Wilkinson played the role of Rocket in crime comedy film Two Hands, the 1999 winner of the Australian Film Institute Award for Best Film, opposite Heath Ledger, Rose Byrne and Bryan Brown. In 2000, he played a villain in the Hollywood action blockbuster Mission: Impossible 2 alongside Tom Cruise.

Wilkinson is noted for playing Abigor in the 2007 superhero film Ghost Rider, opposite Nicolas Cage. The same year, he appeared in horror film Storm Warning as Brett and short film Paradise alongside Ewen Leslie.

Wilkinson also continued to sing and rap, after commencing his acting career. In 1996, he performed in a rap group for a tour of southern Queensland. His music has since been included on soundtracks to the films Black Ice, Sample People and Dope, while also playing the lead acting role in the latter.

== Filmography ==
=== Film ===
| Year | Title | Character | Notes |
|---|---|---|---|
| 1999 | Two Hands | Rocket | Feature film |
| 2000 | Sample People | Gus | Feature film |
| 2000 | Mission: Impossible 2 | Michael | Feature film |
| 2003 | Liquid Bridge | Frank | Feature film |
| | Dope | Jim | |
| 2005 | Stealth | EDI Technician | Feature film |
| 2007 | Ghost Rider | Abigor | Feature film |
| 2007 | Storm Warning | Brett | Feature film |

=== Television ===
| Year | Title | Character | Notes |
|---|---|---|---|
| 1996 | Academy | Clarke Cavendish | TV movie |
| 2001 | Head Start | Tran | |
| 2002 | White Collar Blue | Paul Gill | |
| 2007 | East West 101 | Tyler | |
| 2016 | Cleverman | Kennedy | |
