= Long Weekend (2008 film) =

- Theatrical release poster
- Directed by: Jamie Blanks
- Screenplay by: Everett De Roche
- Based on: Long Weekend by Everett De Roche
- Produced by: Gary Hamilton; Nigel Odell
- Starring: Jim Caviezel; Claudia Karvan
- Cinematography: Karl von Möller
- Edited by: Jamie Blanks
- Music by: Jamie Blanks
- Distributed by: Arclight Films
- Release date: 9 October 2008 (Sitges)
- Running time: 88 minutes
- Country: Australia
- Language: English

Long Weekend (released on video in the U.S. as Nature's Grave) is a 2008 Australian psychological horror film and a remake of the 1978 Australian film Long Weekend. It was directed by Jamie Blanks in his final directorial role before his death in March 2026.

== Plot ==
Married couple Peter and Carla have a strained and fractious relationship. After purchasing some expensive camping gear, Peter persuades a reluctant and unimpressed Carla to join him, along with their dog Cricket and another couple on a camping trip, on the isolated Moondah Beach on the North Coast.

En route to their destination, the pair stops off at a pub to ask for directions, where Peter also leaves a message for his friend Luke, with the owner of the premises. From there, Peter attempts to take a shortcut to the beach, but gets lost and the couple are forced to spend the night sleeping in their SUV.

The next morning, they arrive at the campsite, but begin to abuse the natural environment, mirroring their marital conflict and the deterioration of their relationship. As the couple litter, run over kangaroos, shoot a rifle and fell trees, in retaliation, Mother Nature avenges the destructive treatment the couple has inflicted upon their pristine surroundings, driving them to the brink of insanity.

== Cast ==
- James Caviezel as Peter
- Claudia Karvan as Carla
- Robert Taylor as Bartender
- Roger Ward as Truckie
- John Brumpton as Old Timer

== Production ==
The film pays homage to the original, with references including the Eggleston Hotel (named for the original's director, the late Colin Eggleston) and mention of Dr Hargreaves (after the original film's male star John Hargreaves).

It was filmed in Gippsland region of Victoria, Australia, primarily on location within Wilsons Promontory National Park, including Yanakie and Squeaky Beach

== Release ==
The film premiered at the Sitges International Fantastic Film Festival in Spain on 9 October 2008, exactly thirty years after the original film premiered there, and featured at the Edinburgh International Film Festival 2009.

It failed to secure theatrical release and went directly to DVD in Australia.

== Reception ==
The remake of Long Weekend has a 0% approval rating on Rotten Tomatoes based on 6 reviews.

Anton Bitel from Eye for Film, gave the film three and a half stars, saying: "...while Eggleston's film took many years and just as many knocks to earn its place finally in the pantheon of cult horror, this remake, for all its undoubted qualities, is coasting on its predecessor's hard-won status. Only time will tell if Blanks' work will get completely lost in the straight-to-DVD wilderness, or be rediscovered and recognised, like the original, as an Australian classic – but it remains without question an eerie and ambiguous piece..."

Comparing the film to its predecessor, Bernard Hemingway from Cinephilia wrote: "...Jamie Blanks' remake of Colin Eggleston's 1977 film of the same name about a married couple on a camping weekend that goes to hell, is as obvious as they come. Whereas Eggleston and his writer Everett De Roche turned in a fine genre film on a modest budget, Blanks, with De Roche again as writer, has managed to negate everything that the former film did so well and add not one thing of merit."
