= Harrison Sloan Gilbertson =

Australian actor (born 1993)

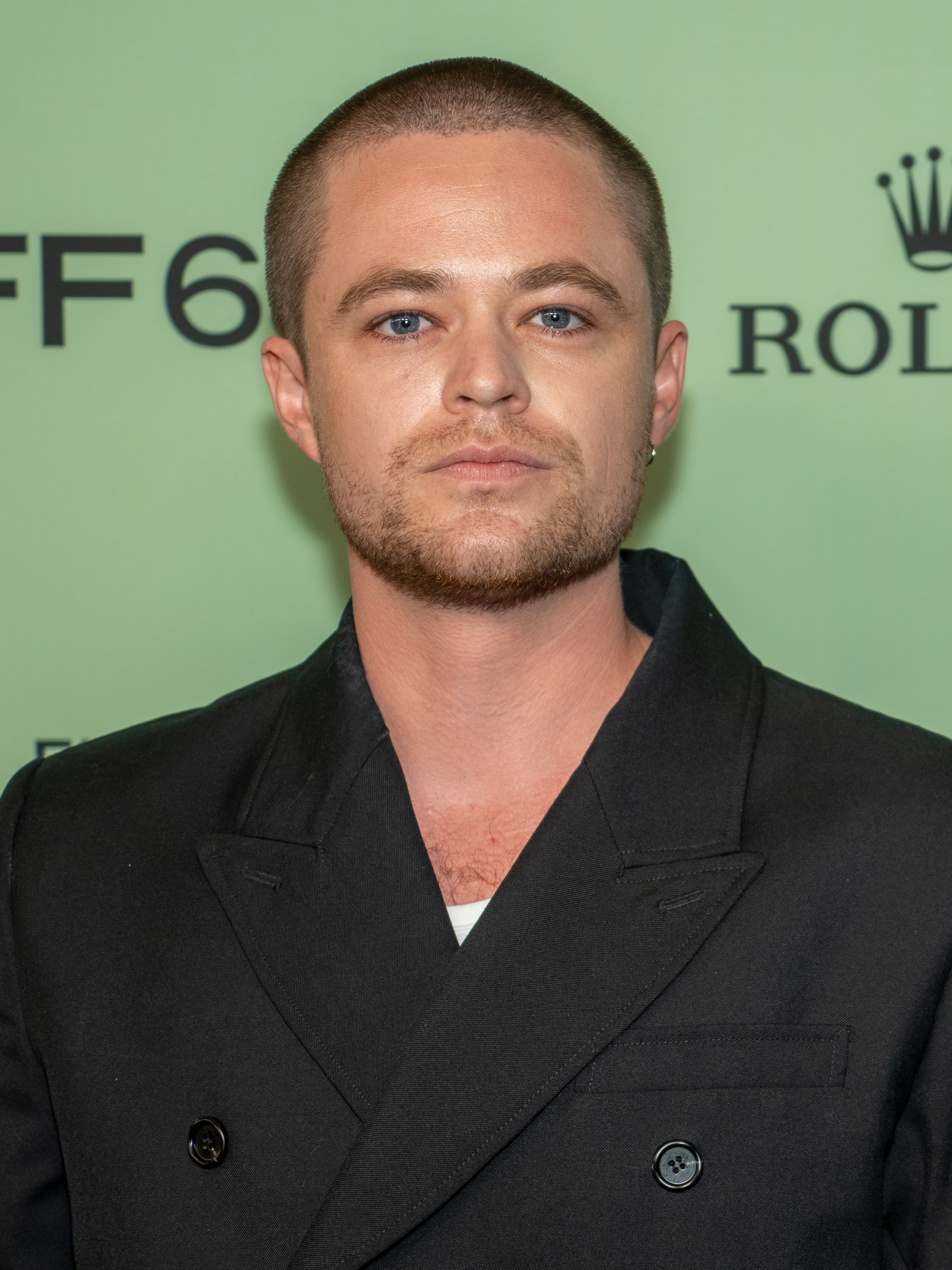
- Gilbertson at the 2025 New York Film Festival
- Born: 29 June 1993 (age 33); Adelaide, Australia
- Occupation: Actor
- Years active: 2002–present

Harrison Sloan Gilbertson (born 29 June 1993) is an Australian actor. Beginning his career as a stage actor, he is known for his roles in the films Upgrade (2018), In The Tall Grass (2019), Oppenheimer (2023), and Springsteen: Deliver Me from Nowhere (2025).

== Early life ==
Harrison Gilbertson was born on 29 June 1993, in Adelaide, South Australia. Originally having performed as a stage actor early in his career at the age of six, Gilbertson rose to further prominence in 2002 at the start of his screen acting career. He was educated at Blackfriars Priory School, located in the nearby suburb of Prospect.

== Career ==
Gilbertson began acting at the age of six when he played the character of Sorrow in a local production of Madama Butterfly. He made his screen debut in 2002, playing the role of the protagonist's younger brother Greggy in Australian Rules. His breakthrough came in 2009, when he landed the lead role of Billy Conway in Accidents Happen. Reviewers commended his performance and acting abilities.

In 2010, Gilbertson won that year's AFI Young Actor Award for his performance as the underage WW1 soldier Frank Tiffin in Beneath Hill 60. He made his US acting debut that same year, starring in the lead role of Emmett in Virginia, directed by Dustin Lance Black.

In 2014, Gilbertson starred as Charlie Boyd in My Mistress, and played the role of Little Pete in the action crime film Need For Speed.

Gilbertson is also known for his work in The Turning (2013), Fallen (2016), Hounds Of Love (2016), Upgrade (2018), Picnic at Hanging Rock (2018), In The Tall Grass (2019), The Peripheral (2022), and the Christopher Nolan–directed film Oppenheimer (2023).

== Filmography ==
=== Film ===
Key
†	Denotes films that have not yet been released

Year	Title	Role	Notes
2002	Australian Rules	Greggy	
2009	Accidents Happen	Billy Conway	
2009	Blessed	Daniel	
2010	Beneath Hill 60	Frank Tiffin	
2010	Virginia	Emmett	
2011	Bush Basher	Weed	
2013	Haunt	Evan Asher	
2013	The Turning	Vic Lang	
2014	My Mistress	Charlie Boyd	
2014	Need for Speed	Pete Coleman	
2016	Fallen	Cameron Briel	
2016	Hounds of Love	Jason	
2018	Upgrade	Eron	
2018	Look Away	Sean	
2019	Measure For Measure	Claudio	
2019	In the Tall Grass	Travis McKean	
2022	Freedom's Path	Lewis	
2023	Oppenheimer	Philip Morrison	
2023	Where All Light Tends to Go	Bull	
2025	Springsteen: Deliver Me from Nowhere	Matt Delia	

=== Television ===
Year	Title	Role	Notes
2012	Conspiracy 365	Callum Ormond	
2018	Picnic at Hanging Rock	Michael Fitzhubert	
2021	Harrow	James Reed	
2022	The Peripheral	Atticus	

== Awards and nominations ==
Year	Award	Category	Work	Result
2010	Australian Film Institute Awards	Young Actor Award	Beneath Hill 60	Won
