= My Mistress =

- Film poster
- Directed by: Stephen Lance
- Written by: Stephen Lance; Gerard Lee
- Produced by: Leanne Tonkes; Stephen Kearney
- Starring: Emmanuelle Beart; Harrison Gilbertson; Rachael Blake; Socratis Otto; Malcolm Kennard
- Edited by: Jill Bilcock
- Production companies: Mini Studios; Screen Australia; Screen Queensland; Film Victoria; Melbourne International Film Festival Premiere Fund
- Distributed by: Transmission Films
- Release date: August 14, 2014 (Melbourne International Film Festival)
- Country: Australia
- Language: English

My Mistress is a 2014 Australian film.

== Plot ==
A sixteen-year-old boy discovers his father's suicide. Distraught, he goes searching for ways to numb the pain. He then meets a mysterious woman who turns out to be a dominatrix and finds solace in her arms.

== Cast ==
- Emmanuelle Beart as Maggie / The Mistress
- Harrison Gilbertson as Charlie Boyd
- Rachael Blake as Kate Boyd
- Socratis Otto as Leon
- Malcolm Kennard as Michael

== Production ==
Filming took place on the Gold Coast in Queensland, Australia.

The production of the film had the BDSM consultancy of the Brazilian dominatrix Kalyss Mercury and the French dominatrix Maîtresse Françoise. (Note: Both mentioned in the film's credits.)
