= Waiting (1991 film) =

- Directed by: Jackie McKimmie
- Written by: Jackie McKimmie
- Produced by: Ross Matthews
- Starring: Noni Hazlehurst; Deborra-Lee Furness; Fiona Press
- Cinematography: Steve Mason
- Edited by: Michael Honey
- Music by: Martin Armiger
- Release date: 25 July 1991
- Running time: 95 minutes
- Country: Australia
- Language: English
- Budget: A$1 million

Waiting is a 1991 Australian film directed by Jackie McKimmie and starring Noni Hazlehurst, Deborra-Lee Furness, and Fiona Press.

== Premise ==
Friends meet at a farm house to await the birth of a baby.

== Cast ==
- Noni Hazlehurst as Clare
- Deborra-Lee Furness as Diane
- Frank Whitten as Michael
- Helen Jones as Sandy
- Denis Moore as Bill
- Fiona Press as Therese
- Ray Barrett as Frank
- Noga Bernstein as Rosie
- Peter Tu Tran as Tan
- Brian Simpson as Booroomil
- Matthew Fargher as Steve

== Box office ==
Waiting grossed $185,600 at the box office in Australia.

== Reception ==
At the AFI Awards Fiona Press won the Best Actress in a Supporting Role award and the film was nominated in 4 other categories. Jackie McKimmie was awarded the OCIC Award – Honorable Mention in the Venice Film Festival.

== See also ==
- Cinema of Australia
