= Bondi Banquet =

2000 Australian TV series

- Genre: Comedy
- Created by: John O'Brien
- Written by: John O'Brien
- Directed by: Ray Argall; Stuart McDonald; Kay Pavlou
- Composer: Alan John
- Country of origin: Australia
- Original language: English
- No. of series: 1
- No. of episodes: 7

Production
- Producer: Robyn Kershaw
- Cinematography: Jenni Meaney
- Running time: 26 minutes

Original release
- Network: SBS
- Release: 20 June 2000 – 2000

Bondi Banquet is a 2000 Australian TV series broadcast on the SBS. The seven part series was described as part soap opera, part cooking show. Set in a Bondi apartment building, each episode focuses on different groups of residents cooking and interacting, until the final episode when they all join for a rooftop BBQ. The recipes for the series were created by Barbara Sweeney.

== Cast ==
=== Episode 1: Mixed Entree ===
Jon Pollard as Midge Beaugeling, Paul Winchester as Andy Meadmore, Asako Izawa as Ikuko Kamonohashi, Valentina Oustimovitch as Mira Reznik, Nicolay Tokor as Mikhail 'Misha' Reznik, Tatiana Poliakova as Lilia Tsukerman, Tara Jakszewicz as Kara Schubert

=== Episode 2: Take Away ===
Paul Goddard as Gerry Svorecki, Kenneth Moraleda as Tim Young, Jason Clarke as Stewie Trembath, Martin Vaughan as Hal Trembath, Carole Skinner as Judy Trembath, Ditch Davey as Dasher Rorschach, David Peatfield as Max Danglars

=== Episode 3: Smorgasbord ===
Elaine Lee as Drusilla Owens, Paul Chubb as Bart L. Booth, Desan Padaychee as Vishwanathen 'Vish' Seth, Pia Miranda as Jo Tognetti, Marco Pio Venturini as Roberto Tognetti, Tara Jakszewicz as Kara Schubert, André Eikmeier as Gaspard Winckler, Imelda Corcoran as Barbara Costello, Elizabeth Maywald as Julie Bocuse, Max Mayward Howard as Maxie Flarn

=== Episode 4: Family Favourities ===
Elaine Lee as Drusilla Owens, Lola Nixon as Maude O'Brien, Imelda Corcoran as Barbara Costello, Elizabeth Maywald as Julie Bocuse, Max Maywald Howard as Maxie Flarn, Cameron Stewart as Iain Stewart

=== Episode 5: Leftovers ===
Mary Coustas as Self, Deborah Mailman as Self, Jacki Weaver as Self, Russell Dykstra as Rufus

=== Episode 6: Steaming ===
Xue Jun Wang as Wang Jiang, Vina Lee as Suzie Ling, Cindy Pan as Yao Wang Yin, Jason Chong as Yao Ming Di, Christian Manon as Georges Quelleure

=== Episode 7: Feast ===
Ensemble cast drawn from previous episodes

== Reception ==
Michael Idato of The Sydney Morning Herald gave it a mixed review stating "It works, barely but it teaches an interesting lesson about technique and program content: there is too little instruction to lend it any culinary value, and too little plot to make it a compelling soap opera." Jenny Tabakoff of The Sydney Morning Herald gave it a negative review calling it a "lemon (with a touch of oregano)." She the mix of the drama and cooking did not work together. Also in The Sydney Morning Herald Robin Oliver was positive and finished "Offbeat, certainly, but where else were we going to be served Martin Vaughan, Carole Skinner, Mary Coustas, Jacki Weaver and the elusive Paul Chubb (and his tomato relish sandwich) all on the one plate? I shall return for seconds."

The Age’s Nicole Brady wrote "The first episode of this quirky new Australian series is a real winner." The Age's Brian Courtis gave it 1 star. He writes "the feast offered proves, on first taste at least, to be a somewhat patchy fusion of food and soapie fiction."
