= Malcolm Kennard =

Australian actor

- Born: August 5, 1967 (age 59); Sydney, Australia
- Occupation: Actor
- Years active: 1987–present

Malcolm Bruce Kennard (born in 1967) is an Australian born actor of theatre, film and television. He has appeared in a wide variety of roles in Australia, from soap opera to mini-series and made for television films and also in US productions.

== Career ==
After doing bit parts in country theatrical productions, Kennard studied acting before making his professional début at the Grant Street Theatre in Melbourne.

Screen appearances soon followed, and he has worked in theatre, film and television ever since. In 1993, Mal received an AFI Award nomination for Best Actor in a Leading Role for Television Drama, for his performance as Luke Shaw in Joh's Jury.

Kennard made a guest appearance in Packed to the Rafters in 2008.

== Personal life ==
Born in Sydney, he spent most of his youth in country New South Wales, before returning to the city for work. He also lived in various parts of the United States during an extended hiatus.

== Filmography ==
=== Film ===
- The Debt Collector (2022) as Mal Kennedy
- Friends and Strangers (2021) as Jay
- Dusters (2020, short film) as Marshall
- Locusts (2019) as Stanley Black
- Measure for Measure (2019) as Sutherland
- Bilched (2019) as Mr Lehmann
- Me and My Left Brain (2019) as Left Brain
- The Defector (2018, short film) as Charles Forwell
- Talkers (2016, short film) as Tom
- Pawno (2015) as Carlo
- Backtrack (2015) as Barry
- The Menkoff Method (2014) as Karpov
- My Mistress (2014) as Michael
- An Accidental Soldier (2013, TV film) as Captain Humphries
- Boys on Film 12: Confession (2014 anthology film, segment: Showboy) as Rob Maxwell
- Stew (2013, short film) as Bill
- Mother's Day (2012, short film) as Tim
- Needle (2010) as Detective Reddick
- Hitchhiker (2010) as Driver
- Bad Bush (2009) as Mal
- Boys Own Story (2007, short film) as Bob
- Fixed (2005) as Steve
- Get Rich Quick (2004) as Bagwan
- The Mystery of Natalie Wood (2004, TV film) as Christopher Walken
- The Matrix Reloaded (2003) as Abel
- Waiting for Anna (2002, short film) as Jeff
- Night of the Coyote (1999) as Cade
- Never Tell Me Never (1998) as Tim Blake
- Diana & Me (1997) as Mark Fraser
- Amy (1997) as Brian Cosgrove
- The Seventh Floor (1994) as Greg
- Joh's Jury (1993, TV film) as Luke Shaw
- Secrets (1992) as Danny
- The Year My Voice Broke (1987) as School Kid (uncredited)

=== Television ===
- Catching Milat (2015, miniseries) as Ivan Milat
- Devil's Playground (2014) as Joe Kelly (4 episodes)
- Old School (2014, miniseries) as Kurt Meeks, the Florist
- Bikie Wars: Brothers in Arms (2012) as Muscles
- The Straits (2012) as Inspector Sutherland
- Killing Time (2011) as Victor Peirce (6 episodes)
- Rush (2011) as Col Rainey (Season 4, 3 episodes)
- Review with Myles Barlow (2010) as Tony (1 episode)
- East West 101 (2009) as Edward Kirkbride (1 episode)
- Packed to the Rafters (2008) as Ronan (1 episode)
- Masters of Horror (2006) as Danny (Season 1, episode 11: Pick Me Up)
- Farscape (2000) as Meelak (1 episode)
- Stingers (1998) as Nick Torris (1 episode)
- Murder Call (1998) as Marty Matthews (Season 2, episodes 10–11: Deadline (Parts 1 & 2))
- Wildside (1998) as Colin Armstrong (1 episode)
- Big Sky (1997) as Larsen (1 episode)
- Pacific Drive (1996) as Cameron Bridges
- G.P. (1992) as Julian Faye (1 episode)
- E Street (1989–91) as Harley Kendrick (episodes 79–236)
- A Country Practice (1999) as Jeff Cook (2 episodes)

== Theatre ==
A partial list of his theatre credits follows:

- The Tragedy of Julius Caesar
- It's Ralph
- The Ad Man
- Suddenly Last Summer
- The Judas Kiss
