= Fiona Press =

Australian actress

- Occupation: Actress

Fiona Press is an Australian actress whose career has spanned over 30 years.

== Career ==
Press was part of the original Australian cast of 1984. In 1991, she won both an AFI Award for Best Actress in a Supporting Role and a Silver Shell for Best Actress for her role in Waiting. Her other film roles include Black Water and Disgrace.

On television, she has appeared in Doctor Doctor, Upright and Diary of an Uber Driver. She also played Hazel Murphy in the soap opera The Heights.

== Filmography ==
=== Film/Shorts/TV Movies ===
Year	Title	Role	Notes
1984	White Man's Legend	Letty	TV Movie
1988	Eden's Lost	Liesli	TV Movie
1990	Sparks		Short
1991	Flirting	Mrs Archer	
1991	Waiting	Therese	
1993	No Worries	Mrs Palmer	
1993	This Won't Hurt a Bit	Wagga Girlfriend	
1995	Napoleon	Wallaby / Gallah	
1996	Lillian's Story	Ruby	
1996	Children of the Revolution (1996 film)	Bank Teller	
1997	Oscar and Lucinda	Mrs Trevis	
1999	Passion	Jenny	
2003	Balmain Boys	Dell	
2006	No Mail	Trish Davis	Short
2007	Black Water	Pat	
2008	Disgrace	Bev Shaw	
2012	Wish You Were Here	Val	
2013	Tracks	Publican's Wife	
2014			
2015	San Andreas	Margie	
2015	Mary: The making of a Princess	Susan Moody	TV Movie
2017	Out of the Shadows	Helen	
2017	Otherlife	TDA Interviewer	
2017	The Pretend One	Therapist	
2020	The Stranger	Margaret	Short
2022	Father	Palliative Nurse	Short

Video Games
Year	Title	Role	Notes
2014	Borderlands: The Pre-Sequel	Maddie	Voice

=== Television ===
Year	Title	Role	Notes
1986-87	Sons and Daughters (Australian TV series)	Heavy / Princess	2 episodes
1989	Police Rescue	Fay	1 episode
1986-93	A Country Practice	Ainslie Forsythe / Kathy Webster	3 episodes
1993	Stark	Karen	3 episodes
1995	Soldier Soldier	Louise	1 episode
1995	Echo Point	Rae	11 episodes
1997	Mirror, Mirror	Pinbody	1 episode
2000	Above the Law	Faye	1 episode
2002	BackBerner	Beverely	1 episode
2001-03	Always Greener	Gillian / Diedre	2 episodes
2006	Two Twisted	Doctor	1 episode
2000-08	All Saints (TV series)	Catherine / Elena	2 episodes
2008	Out of the Blue	Sandra Finer	1 episode
2009	Packed to the Rafters	Sandra Marsh	3 episodes
2009	My Place	Miss Singer	1 episode
2010	Rake	Jessica Mason	1 episode
2011	At Home with Julia	Diane	1 episode
2011	Crownies	Justice Danielle Vignando	1 episode
2012	Underbelly (TV series)	Police Psych	1 episode
2014	The Moodys	Wendy	1 episode
2014	Old School	Maddie	1 episode
1992–2017	Home and Away	Various	9 episodes
2019	Secret City	Sylvie Dunkley	4 episodes
2019	Diary of an Uber Driver	Lynda	1 episode
2019	Upright	Pharmacist	1 episode
2019	Doctor Doctor	Dr Kourdair	1 episode
2019	The Other Guy	Winnie	3 episodes
2019–2020	The Heights	Hazel Murphy	60 episodes
2021	RFDS	Sue	1 episode
2022	Joe vs. Carole	Shirley	3 episodes
2022	Pieces of Her	Mrs. Barfield	1 episode
2023	Space Rats	Head of N.E.S.T	2 episodes
2023	One Night	Laura	4 episodes
