= Laysla De Oliveira =

Canadian actress (born 1992)

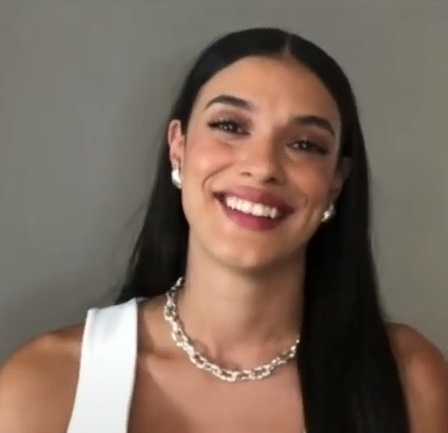
- De Oliveira in 2023
- Born: January 11, 1992 (age 34); Toronto, Ontario, Canada
- Occupation: Actress
- Years active: 2010–present
- Spouse: Jonathan Keltz (m. 2024)

Laysla De Oliveira (Brazilian Portuguese: [laˈizlɐ dʒi oliˈvejɾɐ]; born January 11, 1992) is a Canadian actress. She is known for her roles as Dodge in the Netflix series Locke & Key, Cruz Manuelos in the Paramount+ spy series Lioness, Veronica in the drama film Guest of Honour, and Becky DeMuth in the horror film In the Tall Grass.

== Biography ==
De Oliveira was born in Toronto, Ontario, to a family of Brazilian origin. She began a modeling career at the age of 14, but always wanted to be an actress. She studied drama and dance at Rosedale Heights School of the Arts, and once she went to college, she finally acquired an acting agent.

After acting in several television films and direct-to-video films, De Oliveira was cast in Natty Zavitz's romantic drama film Acquainted in 2017 as the character of Emma. The film premiered at the Whistler Film Festival on December 1, 2018.

In August 2018, De Oliveira was cast as Becky DeMuth in the Netflix horror film In the Tall Grass, directed by Vincenzo Natali and based on the novella by Stephen King and Joe Hill. The film was released on October 4, 2019.

While in Toronto to film In the Tall Grass, Atom Egoyan asked to meet with De Oliveira, leading to her being cast as the starring role of Veronica in the film Guest of Honour. The film premiered at the Venice Film Festival on September 3, 2019.

De Oliveira was announced to be in another adaptation of Joe Hill's work in February 2019, as the antagonist role of Dodge in the Netflix series Locke & Key, based on the graphic novels of the same name. While filming the show, she also reunited with Vincenzo Natali, who directed the last two episodes of the first season. The first season was released on Netflix on February 7, 2020. De Oliveira was very excited to play a villain role for the first time, and the character of Dodge greatly appealed to her because of her unapologetic nature to be evil, which is something rarely seen in roles given to female actors. De Oliveira was inspired by Angelina Jolie's performance as the title character in Maleficent for her portrayal of Dodge.

== Personal life ==
De Oliveira started dating actor Jonathan Keltz in 2012. The couple became engaged in Malibu, California, in December 2021. They got married in 2024.

== Filmography ==
=== Film ===
List of film performances by Laysla De Oliveira
Year	Title	Role	Notes
2016	Onto Us	Maria	Short film
2016	An American Girl: Lea to the Rescue	Paula Ferreira	
2018	Acquainted	Emma	
2018	One by One	Lita	
2019	Guest of Honour	Veronica	
2019	Business Ethics	Rosa	
2019	In the Tall Grass	Becky DeMuth	
2019	Code 8	Maddy	
2021	Needle in a Timestack	Sibila	

=== Television ===
List of television performances by Laysla De Oliveira
Year	Title	Role	Notes
2012	Covert Affairs	Johanna Peeters	Episode: "Scary Monsters (and Super Creeps)"
2013	Gothica	Tessa	TV movie
2013	Nikita	Bettina	Episode: "Brave New World"
2017	Jalen Vs. Everybody	Angela	TV movie
2018	iZombie	Zoe Ward	Episode: "Don't Hate the Player, Hate the Brain"
2018–19	The Gifted	Glow	3 episodes
2020–2022	Locke & Key	Echo/Dodge	Main cast (season 1), recurring role (seasons 2–3)
2023–present	Lioness	Cruz Manuelos	Main cast
