= Fell (film) =

- Directed by: Kasimir Burgess
- Written by: Natasha Pincus
- Based on: a story by Burgess and Pincus
- Produced by: John Maynard; Mary Minas
- Starring: Matt Nable; Isabella Garwoli; Brett Robin
- Cinematography: Marden Dean
- Edited by: Simon Price
- Music by: Luke Altmann
- Release date: 2014
- Running time: 100 minutes
- Country: Australia
- Language: English

Fell is a 2014 Australian film written by Natasha Pincus and directed by Kasimir Burgess.

== Cast ==
- Matt Nable as Thomas / Chris
- Isabella Garwoli as Lara
- Brett Robin as Steve
- Eddie Baroo as Gary
- Syd Brisbane as Smythe
- Daniel Henshall as Luke
- Adele Perovic as Karen
- Daniel P. Jones as Used Car Salesman
- Jacqueline McKenzie as Rachel
- John Brumpton as Bob
- Richard Sutherland as Jeffries
- Reef Ireland as Sammy
- Damian Hill as Kelly
- Sue Jones as Isabel
- Emily Thomson as Madeleine
- Sarah Hallam as Briony

== Reception ==
The Hollywood Reporter's Megan Lehmann stated "With lush cinematography from Marden Dean and the languid pace of an unfurling dream, Fell sometimes verges on Terrence Malick-style impressionism. But it is much more than a reverie. A strong narrative structure, courtesy of a beautifully spare, dialogue-light screenplay by Natasha Pincus (director of the music video for Gotye’s Somebody That I Used To Know), keeps a propulsive tension at its core"

Writing in The Sydney Morning Herald Garry Maddox said "It's a film that rewards attention and patience, as shown by the warm reception at the world premiere in the festival's competition." In the Age Craig Mathieson gave it a 4 star review.

SBS's Russell Edwards gave it 1 1/2 stars finishing "A bolder and far more interesting film could have emerged if Thomas had adhered to his Old Testament stirrings, but the director and his scriptwriter Natasha Pincus prove too timid to truly challenge audience expectations. The dramatic decision to play ‘nice’ lacks daring because it never really questions the inherent decency of all greenies. As a result, by its finale, Fell has become a limp Cape Fear for conservationists that's as guilty of pandering to its niche audience as Red Dog pandered to the mining industry."

== Awards ==
- 4th AACTA Awards
  - Best Cinematography - Marden Dean - nominated

== See also ==
- Cinema of Australia
