= David Field (actor) =

Australian actor and director

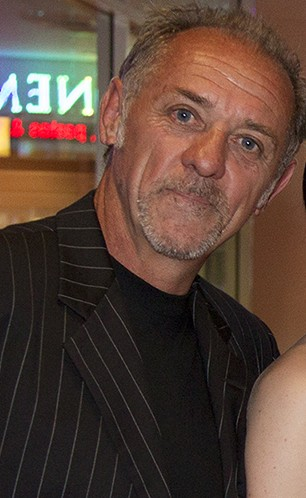
- Field in 2014
- Born: 6 June 1961 (age 65); Australia
- Occupations: Actor; film director; voice artist
- Years active: 1986–present
- Known for: City Homicide

David Field is an Australian character actor and film director. He is known for his roles in the 1999 film Two Hands and as Detective Superintendent Terry Jarvis in the TV series City Homicide.

== Career ==
David Field has appeared in numerous film and television roles, including Two Hands, as Detective Superintendent Terry Jarvis in the Channel 7 TV series City Homicide.

In 2009, Field made his directorial debut with The Combination, a drama film which focuses on the relationships between Lebanese Australians and Anglo Australians in parts of Western Sydney. He followed this up in 2019 with a sequel, The Combination: Redemption.

He is also known for his role as the ex-prison inmate uncle in the mini series A Moody Christmas.

== Other activities ==
Field is an amateur organist and gave some recitals in Sydney at a young age. He featured in The Australian Organist of December 1997.

== Personal life ==
Field is the brother of Steven Field, partner of actress and artistic director Rhoda Roberts.

== Filmography ==
=== Feature films ===
==== Director ====
Year	Title
2009	The Combination
2014	Convict
2019	The Combination: Redemption

==== Actor ====
Year	Title	Role	Notes
1988	Ghosts... of the Civil Dead	Wenzil	
1992	Seeing Red	William	
1993	Broken Highway	Tatts	
1994	Exile	Timothy Dullach	
1994	Everynight ... Everynight	Christopher Dale	
1995	Dad and Dave: On Our Selection	Dan	
1996	Blue Heelers	Mick Doyle	
1996	To Have & to Hold	Stevie	
2000	Mr. Accident	Duxton / Sir Walter Raleigh	
2000	Sample People	TT	
2000	Chopper	Keithy George	
2001	Jet Set	Roger	
2001	Silent Partner	John	
2003	Gettin' Square	Arnie DeViers	
2003	The Night We Called It a Day	Bob Hawke	
2004	Tom White	Phil	
2004	Oyster Farmer	Brownie	
2007	West	Doug	
2007	Unfinished Sky	Carl Allen	
2008	$9.99	Sammy	Voice role
2010	The Nothing Men	David Snedden	
2012	Careless Love	Dion	
2013	Mystery Road	Mr Bailey	
2013	Battle of the Damned	Duke	
2013	These Final Hours	Radio Man	
2014	Convict	Warden	
2014	The Rover	Archie	
2014	The Inbetweeners 2	Uncle Bryan	
2015	Now Add Honey	Roger Gardham	
2015	Last Cab to Darwin	Dougie	
2016	Down Under	Vic	
2016	Sacred Heart	Priest	
2017	The Pretend One	Roger	
2020	The Translator	Chase	
2020	Moon Rock For Monday	Detective Lionell	
2020	High Ground	Kurtz	
2021	Mortal Kombat	Referee	
2022	Loveland (aka Expired)	Sam	
2023	Dark Art	Simon	
2024	Furiosa: A Mad Max Saga	Toe Jam	
2026	The Bluff	Paston Bradley	

=== Short films ===
Year	Title	Role
1993	Just Desserts	
1993	Touch Me	Roderick
1995	Stitched	
1995	Miss November	Man
1999	The Order	Bill
2000	Brother	Brother One
2001	One Night The Moon	Allman
2006	All is Forgiven	Narrator
2008	Seven Seven Seven	Elias Rogers
2012	Convenience	Shop Assistant
2015	Injury Time	Billy Bourke
2017	Rookie	Sarge
2017	Monoliths	The Driver
2020	The Wrong Barber	The Barber

=== Television ===
Year	Title	Role	Notes
1986	Sons and Daughters	Delivery Man	1 episode
1988	Joe Wilson	Billy Spicer	1 episode
1990	A Country Practice	Lenny Jackson	2 episodes
1991	Home and Away	Kenny Gibbs	11 episodes
1992	Police Rescue	Paul	1 episode
1995–2005	Blue Heelers	Charlie Biden / Michael Doyle	4 episodes
1996	The Beast	Scranton	2 episodes
1996	Snowy River: The Mcgregor Saga	Dave Turner	1 episode
1997–2000	Water Rats	Warren / Doug	4 episodes
1998	Wildside	Alan	1 episode
2000	Grass Roots	Daryl Kennedy	2 episodes
2002	Farscape	Ho'ock	1 episode
2004	Stingers	Nick Tascone	1 episode
2005–07	The Incredible Journey of Mary Bryant	Thomas	3 episodes
2007	The Circuit	Kenneth	1 episode
2007–11	City Homicide	Terry Jarvis	59 episodes
2010	Wilfred	Arthur	2 episodes
2010	Rake	Denny Lorton	1 episode
2011	Rescue: Special Ops	Sidney Carter	1 episode
2011	Wild Boys	Captain Gunpowder	10 episodes
2012	A Moody Christmas	Rhys	2 episodes
2013	Miss Fisher's Murder Mysteries	Sergeant Ford	1 episode
2014	The Moodys	Rhys	1 episode
2014	The Gods of Wheat Street	Harry Hamilton	5 episodes
2015	Catching Milat	Neil Birse	2 episodes
2015–18	No Activity	Bruce	11 episodes
2016	Changed Forever	Billy Hughes	
2016–17	The Secret Daughter	Gus Carter	12 episodes
2019	Preacher	Archangel	7 episodes
2022	Shantaram	Wally Nightingale	12 episodes
2023	Ten Pound Poms	Dean Spender	3 episodes
2026	High Country	Jax Mason	TV series

=== TV movies ===
Year	Title	Role
1988	Dadah Is Death	Mr Travis
2001	My Husband, My Killer	Bill Vandenburg
2001	Invincible	Slate
2002	Blood Crime	Jonah Ganz
2003	BlackJack: Murder Archive	Terry Kavanaugh
2004	BlackJack: Sweet Science	Terry Kavanaugh
2005	Hell Has Harbour Views	Greg Hogan
2005	BlackJack: In the Money	Terry Kavanaugh
2005	BlackJack: Ace Point Game	Terry Kavanaugh
2006	BlackJack: Dead Memory	Terry Kavanaugh
2006	Blackjack: At the Gates	Terry Kavanaugh
2007	Blackjack Ghosts	Terry Kavanaugh

== Music videos ==
- Paul Kelly – If I Could Start Today Again – actor
- David Field played the Narrator in the Short Film, All Is Forgiven for Tex, Don and Charlie written and directed by Karen Borger. The film was made to promote the TDC album All Is Forgiven and included a stand-alone video clip for the single Whenever It Snows.
