= John Brumpton =

Australian actor (born 1958)

- Born: 28 July 1958 (age 68); Australia
- Education: Blacktown High School; Theatre ACT; Victorian College of the Arts
- Occupations: Actor, writer
- Years active: 1992—present

John Brumpton (born 28 July 1958) is an Australian actor who has appeared in a large number of local productions.

== Early life ==
Brumpton grew up in Sydney, attending Blacktown High School. He graduated from the University of New South Wales in 1982, before relocating to Darwin to work as a surveyor. He then took a surveying job in the Australian Capital Territory in 1984.

In 1985, Brumpton was the Australian (full contact) Kung Fu Champion as well as representing Australia in Amateur Boxing at the prestigious Kings Cup tournament in Thailand.

Brumpton studied at Theatre ACT when he lived in Canberra. He then moved to Melbourne in 1986 and Brumpton was accepted into the Victorian College of the Arts to train as an actor, but several weeks was invited him to come back. He completed the course, graduating in December 1988.

== Career ==
=== Film and television ===
After starring in his friend, director Lawrence Johnston's debut film Night Out in 1990, Brumpton's breakthrough role came as Magoo in 1992 drama film Romper Stomper, alongside Russell Crowe and Jacqueline McKenzie. After hearing about the project, he rang writer-director Geoffrey Wright, only to be told that the film was fully cast, but a few weeks later he scored a role.

In 1995, Brumpton had a recurring role as Officer Gilbert in ABC series Correlli, starring Deborra-Lee Furness and Hugh Jackman in his breakthrough role. That same year, Brumpton co-wrote and had his first starring role in 1996 feature film Life, an adaptation of his play, Containment. He was nominated for Best Actor in a Leading Role and Best Adapted Screenplay at the 1996 Australian Film Institute Awards. Life also won the International Critics Prize at the 1996 Toronto International Film Festival and had its world premiere at the Berlin Film Festival.

Brumpton's second film in a leading role, Dance Me to My Song (1998) in which he played Eddie, was screened in competition at the 1998 Cannes Film Festival. In 1999, he played the lead role of Detective Robbie Walsh in the film Redball. The film won the Gold Jury Award for Best Narrative Feature Film at the Chicago Underground Film Festival 1999 and was the first digital film produced in Australia.

In 2003, Brumpton appeared opposite Colin Friels as Andy in the made for television film BlackJack: Murder Archive, reprising the role in the second of the film series BlackJack: Ace Point Game in 2005. From 2005 to 2006, he played the recurring role of Ben Wilde in short-lived drama series HeadLand. He also had a recurring role as George in 2006 miniseries RAN Remote Area Nurse.

Brumpton's short film script William (2007) received production co-funding from the Australian Film Commission and Film Victoria's 2005 Short Film Fund. It was the only Australian short film selected to screen at the 2007 Sundance Film Festival. From 2007 to 2008, he had a recurring guest role as Hunt in the first season of East West 101. In 2008, he played Vince Love in the debut season of underworld crime series Underbelly. The following year, he played the regular role of Bryan Dougherty in ensemble drama series Tangle, for Showcase.

Brumpton portrayed sadist, Eric Stone ('Daddy') in 2009 Australian horror film The Loved Ones, alongside Xavier Samuel. That same year, he played Max in western drama film Last Ride, opposite Hugo Weaving. Both films screened in competition at the 2009 Toronto International Film Festival, where The Loved Ones won the Audience Choice Award that same year. The following year saw him appear opposite Ryan Kwanten and Steve Bisley as Rex in western thriller Red Hill.

Brumpton played the role of real life serial killer, Peter Dupas in 2011 crime drama series Killing Time, alongside David Wenham and Colin Friels. In 2014, he played the role of Reuben Fox in crime miniseries Fat Tony & Co. That same year, he appeared in a prison drama series Wentworth, in the recurring guest role of Malcom Spitz.

In 2015, Brumpton played the lead role of Les Underwood in the romantic comedy-drama ensemble film Pawno, earning him Best Actor nominations at both the 2016 AACTA Awards and the 2017 AFCA Awards. He then appeared in several miniseries, including Gallipoli (2015), Catching Milat (2016) and Deep Water (2016),

Brumpton next reprised the role of Magoo in 2018 Stan miniseries Romper Stomper (25 years after his appearance in the film of the same name), designed to be a sequel to the original. The following year, he reunited with his Last Ride co-star, Hugo Weaving in Measure for Measure, a modern take on the Shakespeare play set in Melbourne's crime-infested commission flats.

In 2020, Brumpton appeared in action-thriller High Ground, playing the ill-fated Donovan, opposite Simon Baker and Jack Thompson. That same year, he had a recurring role opposite Guy Pearce, in Jack Irish. In 2023, he played the role of Ashtray Frank Amente in the first season of Paramount+ underworld crime thriller series Last King of the Cross for 8 episodes. The following year, he wrote the screenplay for 2024 sports drama film Kid Snow, featuring Phoebe Tonkin, also taking on the role of Jack in the film.

Brumpton has also performed in numerous short films, including the 2006 Tropfest finalist, Silencer.

=== Theatre ===
Brumpton has performed in stage productions for Melbourne Theatre Company, Playbox Theatre and Jigsaw Theatre Company.

His play It Ain't Rehabilitation It's Containment was staged to sold out audiences at Melbourne's La Mama in 1991.

== Filmography ==
=== Film ===
Year	Title	Role	Notes	Ref.
1990	Night Out			
1990	State of Mind		Short film	
1990	The Man in the Blue and White Holden		Short film	
1991	Holidays on the River Yarra	Mercenary		
1991	On the Border of Hopetown		Short film	
1992	Garbo	Troy		
1992	Romper Stomper	Magoo		
1992	Wednesday	Helmut	Short film	
1993	Flynn (aka My Forgotten Man)	Jarvis		
1993	Silent Number	Man at Door	Short film	
1994	Trumpet		Short film	
1994	Only the Brave	Paul		
1994	Everynight ... Everynight	Prisoner		
1994	My Mother Practises Drowning		Short film	
1995	Angel Baby	Clubhouse Client		
1995	Queeny		Short film	
1995	Maidenhead	Mailman	Short film	
1996	Life	Des		
1996	Thump	Mick	Short film	
1998	Dance Me to My Song	Eddie		
1998	Deep	Knuckles	Short film	
1999	Redball	Det. Robbie Walsh		
1999	Dogwatch	Heckle		
2002	Trojan Warrior (aka Kick to the Head)	Saunders		
2003	Gettin' Square	Lenny Morrison		
2004	All the Kings Horses	Jarrod	Short film	
2004	Tom White	Plain Clothes Officer		
2004	The Message		Short film	
2005	Whole Heart		Short film	
2006	Silencer	Slim	Short film	
2006	Welcome Stranger	Stan		
2006	William		Short film	
2007	Storm Warning	Poppy		
2008	Long Weekend (aka Nature's Grave)	Old Timer		
2009	The Combination	Mr. Roberts		
2009	Last Ride	Max		
2009	The Loved Ones	Daddy Stone		
2010	Red Hill	Rex		
2010	Tethered	Foreman	Short film	
2011	The Father	Walter	Short film	
2011	The Hunter	Publican		
2012	Crawlspace	Elvis		
2012	V for Vienetta	Desmond Stewart	Short film	
2012	Ricochet		Short film	
2012	Tethered		Short film	
2013	We Keep on Dancing	Danny	Short film	
2013	Without Warrant (aka The Line)	William Kemp		
2013	Felony	Garbo / Street Sweeper		
2013	Charlie's Country	Policeman Brum		
2013	Kings		Short film	
2013	Going Up	Driver	Short film	
2014	The Boy Who Had No Thumbs	The Father	Short film	
2014	Fell	Bob		
2015	Rigor Mortis	John	Short film	
2015	Pawno	Les Underwood		
2016	Sucker	Elmsley		
2016	Scare Campaign	George		
2016	Muffin		Short film	
2016	The Menkoff Method	Security Guard Wills		
2017	Australia Day	Les Yebery		
2017	Akoni			
2017	Lost Gully Road	Shop Keeper		
2018	The Body Corporate	Douglas	Short film	
2019	Measure for Measure	Percy		
2019	The Diver	Malcolm	Short film	
2019	The Fall	Older Aydin	Short film	
2020	Tough	Mick	Short film	
2020	High Ground	Donovan		
2020	Widowers	Vic	Short film	
2020	Father	Jack	Short film	
2022	The Debt Collector	Vaughan		
2024	Kid Snow	Jack		

=== Television ===
Year	Title	Role	Notes	Ref.
1989	The Flying Doctors	Nipper	Episode: "Word & Deed"	
1990	Skirts	Robert	1 episode	
1991	Boys from the Bush	Joe	1 episode	
1991	Ratbag Hero	Carter	Miniseries	
1991	Rose Against the Odds	Drinker #2	TV movie	
1991	Neighbours	Vince McCann	4 episodes	
1991	Chances	Sleaze	1 episode	
1992	Phoenix	Gonzo	Episode: "Shaking the Tree"	
1992	A Country Practice	Michael Perry	2 episodes: "Heaven's Gate: Parts 1 & 2"	
1994	Law of the Land	Roger Halliday	Episode: "Win, Lose and Draw"	
1994–2005	Blue Heelers	Greg Duncan / Tim Merrett / Harvey McManus / Shane Kelly	4 episodes	
1995	Correlli	Officer Gilbert	Main role, 8 episodes	
1997	The Adventures of Lano and Woodley	Sound Guy	1 episode	
1997–1998	Wildside	Tony Pellucci	4 episodes	
1998	State Coroner	Clint the Hirer	Episode: "Three's a Crowd"	
1998; 2000	Stingers	Ronnie Gallagher / Steve Devlin	2 episodes	
1998–2008	All Saints	Steve Casey / Charlie Ellis	4 episodes	
2000	Home and Away	Mick Dwyer	1 episode	
2000	Grass Roots	Mr. Bain	2 episodes: "Late July, Friday 4pm to 10.30pm", "The Whole Year"	
2000	Water Rats	Joe Slaven	Episode: "Tribes"	
2000; 2003	Farscape	Katoya / B'Sogg	2 episodes	
2003	Roy Hollsdotter Live	Bouncer 1	TV movie	
2003	BlackJack: Murder Archive	Andy Margate	TV movie	
2003	White Collar Blue	Slater	Episode: "1.22"	
2005	BlackJack: Ace Point Game	Andy	TV movie	
2005–2006	headLand	Ben Wilde	8 episodes	
2006	RAN Remote Area Nurse	George	Miniseries, 5 episodes	
2007–2008	East West 101	John Hunt	3 episodes	
2008	Underbelly	Vince Love	3 episodes	
2008	Rush	Charlie Thomas	Episode: "1.3"	
2008	City Homicide	Scott Hurley	Episode: "Spoils of War"	
2009	Rogue Nation	William Charles Wentworth	Documentary miniseries, episode: "Rights of Passage"	
2009	Tangle	Bryan Dougherty	10 episodes	
2010	Sea Patrol	Malachi	Episode: "Crocodile Tears"	
2010	Rake	Leon	Episode: "R vs Tanner"	
2011	Killing Time	Peter Dupas	Main role, 9 episodes	
2013	Miss Fisher's Murder Mysteries	Finlay Ellis	Episode 3: "Dead Man's Chest"	
2014	Fat Tony & Co.	Reuben Fox	2 episodes	
2014	Wentworth	Malcom Spitz	3 episodes	
2015	Gallipoli	Sergeant Major	Miniseries, 2 episodes	
2015	Catching Milat	Artie Bigman	Miniseries, 2 episodes	
2016	Deep Water	Eddie Mac	Miniseries, 4 episodes	
2018	Jack Irish	Dyson	3 episodes	
2018	Romper Stomper	Magoo	6 episodes (reprised role from 1992 film)	
2020	Mystery Road	Hegarty	2 episodes	
2023	Last King of the Cross	Ashtray Frank Amente	8 episodes	

== Theatre ==
Year	Title	Role	Notes	Ref
1985	The Big Apple		Playhouse, Canberra	
1988	Concepts Inc		Studio Theatre, Melbourne with Victorian Arts Centre	
1989	New Short Works – Spoleto Fringe Program 2		Universal Theatre, Melbourne with Spoleto Fringe Festival	
1990	Grass	Chris	Theatre Works, Melbourne	
1990	Hunger		Universal Theatre, Melbourne	
1991	It Ain't Rehabilitation It's Containment		La Mama, Melbourne (also devisor)	
1991	Everynight, Everynight		Carlton Courthouse, Melbourne	
1992	Knockabouts: The Dominator		Carlton Courthouse, Melbourne with La Mama	
1992	Three Vignettes – Schools Out		La Mama, Melbourne	
1992	A View from the Bridge	Mike	Playhouse, Melbourne with MTC	
1993	The Chocolate Frog		Gorman House Arts Centre, Canberra with Jigsaw Theatre Company	
1994	The Lady from the Sea	A Stranger	Russell St Theatre, Melbourne with MTC	
1994	Remember Ronald Ryan	Peter Walker / Hangman	Merlyn Theatre, Melbourne with Playbox Theatre Company	
1994	Low		Currong Theatre, Canberra with Grit Theatre	
1996	The Truth Game		Carlton Courthouse, Melbourne (also choreographer)	
1998	The Drover's Boy		Melbourne Athenaeum	
2002	Under the Weather	Video Designer	Gasworks, Melbourne	
2012	Silent Partner	John	Frank Theatre	

== Accolades ==
Year	Award	Category	Film	Result	Ref.
1996	AACTA Awards	Best Adapted Screenplay	Life	Nominated	
1996	AACTA Awards	Best Actor in a Leading Role	Life	Nominated	
2012	Fright Meter Awards	Best Supporting Actor	The Loved Ones	Nominated	
2012	Equity Ensemble Awards	Outstanding Performance by an Ensemble in a Miniseries or Telemovie	Killing Time	Nominated	
2016	AACTA Awards	Best Actor in a Leading Role	Pawno	Nominated	
2016	Cannes Antipodes Film Festival	Best Male New Talent	Pawno	Won	
2017	Australian Film Critics Association Awards	Best Actor	Pawno	Nominated	
