= The Pretend One =

- Directed by: Tony Prescott
- Screenplay by: James Raue; Tony Prescott
- Produced by: Tony Prescott; Dinusha Ratnaweera
- Starring: Geraldine Hakewill; Michael Whalley; Benedict Wall; David Field
- Cinematography: Robert C. Morton
- Edited by: Laurence Van Camp
- Music by: Darren Lim
- Release date: April 2018 (Gold Coast International Film Festival)
- Running time: 86 minutes
- Country: Australia

The Pretend One is an Australian independent realism drama film directed by Tony Prescott. It was filmed in April 2015 in central Queensland, Australia. The screenplay was written by James Raue and Tony Prescott. The Pretend One had its world premiere at the Gold Coast International Film Festival in April 2018 closely followed by its international premiere at Newport Beach Film Festival.

The film was released theatrically for a limited season in March 2019 with various screenings in cities and regional centres concluding in July 2019.

== Cast ==
- Geraldine Hakewill as Charlie
- Michael Whalley as Hugo
- Benedict Wall as Guy
- David Field as Roger
- Alice Roberts as Young Charlie
- Elijah Perris as Young Hugo
- Fiona Press as Therapist

== Reception ==
The Pretend One was met with positive reviews. Matthew Eeles of Cinema Australia gave the film five stars writing "Who would have thought one of the most beautiful, heartfelt, emotional and complex on-screen relationships in Australian film history would be between an adult woman and her imaginary friend". Filmink magazine rated the film 17.5/20 writing "The Pretend One belies its skinny budget, working perfectly with what it’s got at hand, but never skimping on ambition of concept or vision. It’s a sweet but never sentimental film that will break your heart in the best possible way".

== Accolades ==
In 2018, Cinema Australia went on to place The Pretend One at fourth position in its annual Top 5 Australian Films list.
