= Measure for Measure (2019 film) =

- Directed by: Paul Ireland
- Written by: Damian Hill; Paul Ireland
- Based on: Measure for Measure by William Shakespeare
- Produced by: Damian Hill; Paul Ireland
- Starring: Hugo Weaving, Mark Leonard Winter
- Cinematography: Ian Jones
- Edited by: Gary Woodyard
- Music by: Tristan Dewey; Tai Jordan
- Production company: Toothless Pictures
- Distributed by: Samuel Goldwyn Films
- Release dates: August 2019 (Melbourne International Film Festival); September 4, 2020
- Running time: 107 minutes
- Country: Australia
- Language: English

Measure for Measure is a 2019 Australian drama film written by Damian Hill and Paul Ireland, directed by Ireland and starring Hugo Weaving. It is based on the play of the same title by William Shakespeare.

== Cast ==
- Hugo Weaving as Duke
- Harrison Gilbertson as Claudio
- Megan Smart as Jaiwara
- Mark Leonard Winter as Angelo
- Daniel Henshall as Lukey
- Fayssal Bazzi as Farouk
- Doris Younane as Karima
- Malcolm Kennard aa Sutherland
- Gerald Lepkowski as Boyle
- John Brumpton as Percy

== Plot ==
The film is loosely based on the Shakespeare play, but with the story set in a housing commission block of flats in Melbourne.

== Production ==
Co-writer, director, producer and star Damian Hill died on 22 September 2018, having taken his own life two days before filming was due to start. The event shocked and traumatised all involved with the film, especially co-writer Paul Ireland and actor Mark Leonard Winter, who were close friends with Hill. Winter assumed Hill's role as the drug dealer Angelo in the film, and filming resumed a week later.

The film, which was supported by the Melbourne International Film Festival Premier fund, was dedicated to Hill.

== Release ==
Measure for Measure premiered at the 2019 Melbourne International Film Festival, where the Damian Hill Independent Film was awarded in Hill's honour.

In June 2020, it was announced that the North American distribution rights to the film were acquired by Samuel Goldwyn Films. The film was released on demand and digital on September 4, 2020.

== Reception ==
As of February 2024 Measure for Measure has a 36% rating on Rotten Tomatoes based on 28 reviews.

Robin Holabird of KUNR gave the film a positive review and wrote, "By all measures, this Measure for Measure totals up into an absorbing cinematic experience."

Josiah Teal of Film Threat gave the film an 8 out of 10 and wrote, "...the film discusses issues such as multiculturalism, gender, drugs, and religion in a way that is increasingly relevant in 2020 without ever feeling heavy-handed."

Monica Castillo of RogerEbert.com awarded the film two stars and wrote, "However, there's a lot going on in the movie without ever really exploring those topics beyond a cursory mention."

John DeFore of The Hollywood Reporter gave the film a negative review and wrote, "Shakespeare scholars have often labeled Measure for Measure a 'problem play,' a term that has been given multiple meanings; Ireland’s tonally ambivalent film fits one of those meanings pretty well."

Jeannette Catsoulis of The New York Times also gave the film a negative review and wrote, "Convoluted and ponderously paced, Measure for Measure relies too often on sentimental music and narrative shorthand."
