= Michael Denkha =

Australian actor

- Born: Tehran, Iran
- Occupation: Actor
- Years active: 1996–present

Michael Denkha is an Assyrian-Australian actor known for his roles in Get Rich Quick, Stealth, The Combination, Down Under and, most recently, Here Come the Habibs TV series.

== Biography ==
Born in Tehran, Iran, Denkha moved to Australia at a young age, where he pursued a career in acting. Denkha, who is of Assyrian ethnicity, graduated from Australia's National Institute of Dramatic Art (NIDA) with a degree in performing arts (acting) in 1995.

His first known appearance on television was on the 1996 TV series Police Rescue. As the years followed, Denkha played roles in Water Rats, Stingers, All Saints and a number of TV shows throughout his career. In 2005 he played a small role in the American, Australian and New Zealand, production movie Stealth, before being credited for his work on the 2009 Australian drama film The Combination and the 2016 comedy film Down Under.

In 2016, Denkha was chosen to play a leading role as Fou Fou Habib in the Channel 9 comedy show Here Come the Habibs.

== Filmography ==
=== Television appearances ===
Year	Title	Role	Notes
2024	Boy Swallows Universe (TV series)	George Masoumi	1 episode
2022	Wolf Like Me (TV series)	Taxi Driver	1 episode
2021	Hardball (2019 TV series)	Jim	1 episode
2020	Operation Buffalo (TV series)	Doug	2 episodes
2019	Secret City (TV series)	Michael Lavelle	5 episodes
2018	On the Ropes (TV series)	Ahmad	2 episodes
2018	How to Stay Married	Amir Essa	3 episodes
2010-18	Rake (Australian TV series)	Roy / Thommo	3 episodes
2018	Sando (TV series)	Mikal	1 episode
2017	Blue Murder: Killer Cop	Bill Jalalaty	1 episode
2016-17	Here Come the Habibs	Fou Fou Habib	14 episodes
2014-16	The Code	Nasim Parande	10 episodes
2016	Soul Mates	Eli	4 episodes
2016	Black Comedy	Guest Cast	1 episode
2015	The Principal	Mohammad Ahmad	4 episodes
2015	Catching Milat	Dex Butler	1 episode
2014	Devil's Playground	Massimo Drago	1 episode
2011	At Home With Julia	Jesus the cleaner	4 episodes
2009	East West 101	Akmal Fahd	5 episodes
1998-09	All Saints (TV series)	Various	4 episodes
2007	Chandon Pictures	Andrew	1 episode
2006	Home and Away	Steve Harmer	2 episodes
2006	Small Claims: The Reunion	Vet	TV movie
2005	The Alice	Boyfriend	1 episode
1999-04	Stingers (TV series)	Bruno / Monday	2 episodes
2004	The Alice	Motorcycle Cop	TV movie
2003	Temptation	Joey	TV movie
2002-03	White Collar Blue	Marinade	3 episodes
2003	Blue Heelers	Kris	1 episode
2003	The Postcard Bandit (film)	Pippos	TV movie
2002	Young Lions	Paco	2 episodes
2001	Head Start	Tom	1 episode
1997-01	Water Rats (TV series)	Chicka / Terry	2 episodes
2000	Grass Roots	Ewan McCrum	2 episodes
1999	Murder Call	Carlo	1 episode
1998	Wildside	Steve	1 episode
1996	Whipping Boy	Komras	TV movie
1996	Police Rescue	First Mate	1 episode

=== Film appearances ===
Year	Title	Role	Notes
2024	The Correspondent	Farag Fathy Farag	
2017	Blood Orange	Police Officer	Short
2017	6 Days	Kartouti	
2016	Down Under	Ibrahim	
2010	The Nothing Men	Vince	
2009	The Combination	Ibo	
2009	Vafadar	Amir	Short
2008	Extremists		Short
2005	Stealth (film)	Naval Controller	
2005	Son of the Mask	Animator	
2004	Get Rich Quick	Felix	
2000	Risk	Hospital Husband	
1998	Jimmy	Jimmy	Short
