= Jamie Blanks =

Australian film director and composer (1971–2026)

- Born: 29 November 1971; Melbourne, Victoria, Australia
- Died: 16 March 2026 (aged 54); Melbourne, Victoria, Australia
- Occupations: Film director; composer
- Years active: 1991–2026
- Spouse: Simone Chin
- Children: 1

Jamie Blanks (29 November 1971 – 16 March 2026) was an Australian film director and composer. He directed the cult slasher films Urban Legend (1998) and Valentine (2001). He later directed the horror films Storm Warning (2007) and Long Weekend (2008).

== Early life and education ==
Jamie Blanks was born on 29 November 1971 in Melbourne, where he was also raised. He attended Swinburne Film School (becoming the Victorian College of the Arts during his three years of study).

== Career ==
The path to landing the directing gig on Urban Legend began with Blanks receiving the screenplay for Scream – called Scary Movie at the time – from a manager who had seen his student film.

“I didn’t get the job, obviously, because I was well outgunned by Wes Craven – deservedly so because he is the master,” said Blanks. “Then I got the screenplay for I Know What You Did Last Summer, also by Kevin Williamson, and I thought the only way I could convince producers in Hollywood that I’m capable of making a film is to take the screenplay and try to direct a couple of scenes. Then I had a better idea, which was to make a trailer – shoot all the money shots, all the things that would sell this movie. And that’s what I did with $3,000 and a whole bunch of friends.

“We shot it on 35mm and it turned out really well. I sent it over to the producer, who was ready to hire me on the film, but the ink had already dried on the director’s contract – they hired Jim Gillespie to direct that movie. But they said ‘don’t worry, we’ll find a film for you to direct’ and true to their word, nine months later I was offered Urban Legend based on the strength of that one trailer and student film.”

Blanks credited Phoenix Pictures, producer Neal Moritz and his team with taking a chance and providing him with the opportunity, despite his limited experience. “I think they responded to the fact that I loved the genre.

He gave commentaries on the Urban Legend and Valentine (2001) DVDs. His third feature Storm Warning won awards for Special Effects and Score at Screamfest 2007. Blanks shot, edited and composed the score for his fourth feature, Long Weekend (released on video in the United States as Nature's Grave), starring Jim Caviezel and Claudia Karvan, which was released in 2008.

== Personal life and death ==
Blanks was married to Simone Chin. The couple had one son, Oliver. He died in Melbourne, Victoria, on 16 March 2026, at the age of 54.

== Selected filmography ==
=== Silent Number ===
Silent Number was Jamie Blanks' first film. The film revolves around a babysitter as she spends the night at a creepy house during an electrical storm. During the night, she receives a number of telephone calls from an unidentified caller. The voice sounds scared and pleads with the babysitter for help. We eventually discover the calls are not coming from any normal source.

Silent Number is available to view on YouTube and can be viewed on-site at the VCA library in Melbourne, Australia. It may also be available for viewing at some other libraries.

=== Director ===
- Silent Number (1993)
- Urban Legend (1998)
- Valentine (2001)
- Storm Warning (2007)
- Long Weekend (2008)

=== Composer ===
- The Abbarant (1991)
- Storm Warning (2007)
- Long Weekend (2008)
- Machete Maidens Unleashed! (2010)
- Needle (2010)
- Crawlspace (2012)
