= Ben Geurens =

Australian actor (born 1979)

- Born: 24 December 1979 (age 46); Melbourne, Victoria, Australia
- Education: National Institute of Dramatic Art (2004)
- Occupation: Actor
- Years active: 1988–present

Ben Geurens (born 24 December 1979) is an Australian actor.

== Biography ==
Geurens graduated from NIDA in 2004. At drama school he appeared in productions of The Return, Romeo and Juliet, Much Ado About Nothing, and Who's Afraid of the Working Class.

== Career ==
Geurens is best known for playing Toby Mangel on the soap opera Neighbours from 1990 to 1993. He then appeared in the television series The Man from Snowy River as Michael O'Neil, and the movie Body Melt as Brandon Noble. He made guest appearances in other series such as Blue Heelers.

Geurens played Constable Ash Nader in Home and Away in late 2006 and early 2007, and a detective in the final series of McLeod's Daughters in 2008. He also appeared in the Melbourne Theatre Company's production of Entertaining Mr Sloane, in which he played the lead role of Mr Sloane and also in The History Boys as Dakin.

In 2009, Geurens starred in the comedy series The Jesters as Steve Morris and had guest roles on All Saints and Packed to the Rafters.

He portrayed Gideon Blackburn in the historical-fantasy drama Reign. He also plays the part of The Necromancer on Legacies. Geurens plays the lead role Ryan Black in the crime-thriller film Locusts.

== Filmography ==
=== Film ===
| Year | Title | Role | Notes |
|---|---|---|---|
| 1993 | Body Melt | Brandon Noble | Feature film |
| 2006 | Two Nights | Young Man | Short film |
| 2008 | Monkey Puzzle | Carl | Feature film |
| 2014 | A Short Film by Shauna Lee | Aaron | Short film |
| 2017 | Dick's Clinic | Reece Kidd | |
| 2017 | That's Not Me | Toby-Summer Street | Feature film |
| 2018 | Enter the Wild | Carl | |
| 2019 | Locusts | Ryan Black | Feature film |
| 2021 | Women Is Losers | Dr. Ross | Feature film |
| 2022 | Hollywood Stargirl | Daniel | Feature film |

=== Television ===
| Year | Title | Role | Notes |
|---|---|---|---|
| 1990–1993 | Neighbours | Toby Mangel | TV series, 185 episodes |
| 1994–1996 | Snowy River: The McGregor Saga | Michael O'Neil | TV series, 52 episodes |
| 2000 | Blue Heelers | Carl Wagner | TV series, 1 episode |
| 2006–2007 | Home and Away | Ash Nader | TV series, 12 episodes |
| 2009–2011 | The Jesters | Steve Morris | TV series, 16 episodes |
| 2009 | McLeod's Daughters | Geoff Gardiner | TV series, 3 episodes |
| 2009 | All Saints | Owen | TV series, 1 episode |
| 2009 | Packed to the Rafters | Dermott Bannon | TV series, 1 episode |
| 2010 | City Homicide | Sean Eden | TV series, 1 episode |
| 2012 | Australia on Trial | George Anderson | TV series, 1 episode |
| 2013 | Paper Giants: Magazine Wars | Phil Evans | TV miniseries |
| 2013 | Mr & Mrs Murder | Alan | TV series, 5 episodes |
| 2014 | Winners & Losers | Adam Grbowski | TV series, 7 episodes |
| 2014 | Offspring | Russell | TV series, 1 episode |
| 2015–2017 | Reign | Lord Gideon Blackburn | TV series, 28 episodes |
| 2015 | Catching Milat | David 'Bodge' Milat | TV miniseries, 2 episodes |
| 2016 | Molly | Shirley Strachan | TV miniseries, 2 episodes |
| 2016 | Bringing Our Stories Home | Robert Searby | TV series, 1 episode |
| 2018 | The Good Place | Fred Booth | TV series, 1 episode |
| 2018–2022 | Legacies | The Necromancer | TV series |

== Staff credits ==
| Year | Title | Staff | Notes |
|---|---|---|---|
| 2013 | Lightbulb | Producer & Director | Short Movie |
