= In the Tall Grass (film) =

2019 film by Vincenzo Natali

- Promotional release poster
- Directed by: Vincenzo Natali
- Written by: Vincenzo Natali
- Based on: In the Tall Grass by: Stephen King; Joe Hill
- Produced by: Steve Hoban; Mark Smith; Jimmy Miller; M. Riley
- Starring: Harrison Gilbertson; Laysla De Oliveira; Avery Whitted; Will Buie Jr.; Rachel Wilson; Patrick Wilson
- Cinematography: Craig Wrobleski
- Edited by: Michele Conroy
- Music by: Mark Korven
- Production companies: Netflix; Copperheart Entertainment
- Distributed by: Netflix
- Release dates: September 20, 2019 (Fantastic Fest); October 4, 2019 (Netflix)
- Running time: 101 minutes (Note: The runtime displayed at film festivals shows 90 minutes.)
- Country: Canada
- Language: English

In the Tall Grass is a 2019 Canadian supernatural horror film based on Stephen King and Joe Hill's 2012 novella of the same name. Written and directed by Vincenzo Natali, the story sees a pregnant woman and her brother who, after hearing a cry for help from a young boy within, become lost in a paranormal grass field. It stars Harrison Gilbertson, Laysla De Oliveira, Avery Whitted, Will Buie Jr., Rachel Wilson, and Patrick Wilson.

The project was in initial development in early 2015, and went forward in May 2018, when streaming service Netflix announced that it had purchased the film rights, setting Natali to direct and adapt the screenplay. Principal photography took place in summer 2018 in Toronto, Ontario.

In the Tall Grass had its world premiere at Fantastic Fest on September 20, 2019, and was released on Netflix on October 4, 2019. It received mixed reviews from critics, with many praising the performances, atmosphere and faithfulness to the novella, but criticizing its inconsistent tone and dialogue.

== Plot ==
As they drive past a field of tall grass, a pregnant Becky and her brother Cal hear cries for help from Tobin, a young boy accompanied by his mother Natalie. The two enter the field but get separated and find that their distance changes unnaturally. They decide to leave but cannot find the road. Becky encounters Tobin's father Ross, who tells her to stay close, but she quickly loses sight of him. Cal runs into Tobin holding a dead crow. Tobin buries the bird in the path, claiming the grass doesn't move dead things, and that a rock told him Becky would die soon. Tobin leads Cal to a rock in the field and tells him to touch it. Cal hears Becky's scream before a ghost attacks him.

Travis, the father of Becky's unborn child, enters the field to look for the siblings. He stumbles across Tobin, who implies that they know each other. Tobin leads him to Becky's corpse, saying the field does not move dead things.

Tobin arrives at a nearby church with his parents and Freddy, the family dog. Hearing Travis shouting Tobin's name from the grass, Freddy rushes in, which leads Tobin, Natalie, and Ross to follow and get separated. With the family panicking, the siblings re-enter the grass as Tobin states that Freddy died. Travis, Becky, and Cal move toward Tobin, and all four find each other. Travis says that the siblings have been missing for two months.

Later, the group spots a building in the distance. Becky receives a call from someone warning them not to keep making the same "mistake". The grass seemingly enters Becky's uterus, and she passes out. She is revived by Ross, who then reunites with Tobin and says that he will show them out. Ross leads them to the rock, where Natalie confronts them. She warns them not to touch the rock, and that Ross is dangerous, telling the others to leave. Travis attacks Ross who then dislocates his arm and crushes Natalie's head. Ross claims that the rock showed him the truth and the way out, but he does not want to leave.

Becky, Cal, Travis, and Tobin reach the building. It is revealed that Travis asked Becky to abort their baby, which she refused. Unprepared to be a single parent, Becky, accompanied by Cal, was on the way to meet a family of potential adopters. Travis expresses regret and wishes to be part of his child and Becky's lives. While scouting, Travis and Cal discover that Freddy has escaped the field via a "hole" that leads to the road. Cal lets go of Travis as he slips, causing him to fall off the roof. Tobin flees into the field when Ross follows them to the roof. The two follow Tobin, but Becky refuses to leave Travis and goes back as Cal flees. Ross strangles Cal to death. They are in a time loop, with Cal permanently being hunted by an insane, possessed Ross in the grass. Travis survives and searches for Becky.

Ross attacks Becky, who escapes. A thunderstorm begins. Grass creatures confront and carry Becky to the rock, which has prophetic marks relating to her pregnancy. Becky makes a phone call, pleading for her past self to prevent Cal from hurting Travis. As she screams in pain from contractions, the ground underneath the rock opens, revealing roots that turn into humanoid figures reaching toward her. She passes out and wakes up to Cal. He is holding her baby. She falls asleep again and wakes up to Cal feeding her baby to her and saying that it is just grass and seeds. Becky realizes that "Cal" is Ross. Tobin finds Travis and says that Ross killed both the baby and Cal, and will keep killing them repeatedly. They are confronted by Ross, who mortally wounds Travis. As Ross attempts to force Tobin to touch the rock, Becky attacks him before dying from her wounds. Travis strangles Ross with bundled up grass. To understand, Travis touches the rock and has visions. Travis grabs Tobin's hand, guides him to an exit, states that he is not leaving and instructs Tobin to stop the siblings from entering.

Tobin emerges across the road as the siblings are about to enter the grass, convincing them to stay out by showing them Becky's necklace that Travis gave him, closing the loop. Becky decides to keep her baby as they drive back home. Travis listens to them leaving and then dies.

== Cast ==
- Harrison Gilbertson as Travis McKean
- Laysla De Oliveira as Becky DeMuth
- Avery Whitted as Cal DeMuth
- Will Buie Jr. as Tobin Humboldt
- Rachel Wilson as Natalie Humboldt
- Patrick Wilson as Ross Humboldt

== Production ==
=== Development ===
Director Vincenzo Natali had wanted to make a film adaptation of Stephen King and Joe Hill's short story In the Tall Grass as early as 2015, when he stated:

Who would think that grass could be frightening? Trust Stephen King and Joe Hill to find a way. They have transformed an otherwise innocuous Kansas field into a stage for some of the most disturbing horror fiction I have ever read."

On May 7, 2018, it was announced that Netflix would adopt the short story, with Natali hired to write and direct, and Steve Hoban, Jimmy Miller, and M. Riley producing.

On May 28, 2018, Natali announced that manga artist Shintaro Kago would design the concept art for the film adaptation.

=== Casting ===
Alongside the initial production announcement, it was reported that James Marsden was in negotiations for a lead role. On August 7, 2018, it was announced that Marsden had bowed out of the film due to scheduling conflicts and been replaced with Patrick Wilson. Additionally, it was reported that Laysla De Oliveira, Harrison Gilbertson, Avery Whitted, Rachel Wilson, and Will Buie Jr. had also joined the cast.

=== Filming ===
Principal photography was expected to begin on July 30, 2018, and last until September 14, 2018, in Toronto, Ontario. On July 24, 2018, it was reported that a dilapidated church set had been constructed for the film on a rural road in Perth South, Ontario. On September 20, 2018, filming took place outside of a bowling alley in Elmira, Ontario.

== Release ==
In the Tall Grass had its world premiere at Fantastic Fest on September 20, 2019. On October 4, 2019, the film began streaming on Netflix.

== Reception ==
On the review aggregator website Rotten Tomatoes, 35% of 74 critics' reviews are positive, with an average rating of 5.2/10. The website's consensus reads: "A potentially intriguing premise is rapidly lost in the weeds during In the Tall Grass which struggles to stretch its slim source material to feature length." Metacritic, which uses a weighted average, assigned the film a score of 46 out of 100, based on 13 critics, indicating "mixed or average" reviews.

=== Accolades ===
The film was nominated for Best Streaming Premiere at the 2020 Fangoria Chainsaw Awards.
