= Locusts (2019 film) =

- Film poster
- Directed by: Heath Davis
- Written by: Angus Watts
- Produced by: Angus Watts
- Distributed by: Bonsai Films
- Release date: April 26, 2019 (Newport Beach Film Festival)
- Running time: 85min
- Country: Australia
- Language: English

Locusts is a 2019 independent crime thriller film, written and produced by Dr. Angus Watts and directed by Heath Davis starring Ben Geurens, Jessica McNamee, Nathaniel Dean in lead roles. It was distributed in Australia and New Zealand by Bonsai Films.

It also marks the acting debut of rugby league player George Burgess. It has Chris Bland as DOP, Rick Beecroft as assistant director, Tiare Tomaszewski as line producer, Jason King as associate producer, and Carlo Crescini as production designer.

The film is the final onscreen role of Australian actor Damian Hill who died in September 2018.

The Locusts score by composer Burkhard Dallwitz was nominated for Best Original Soundtrack album at the 2019 ARIA Awards.

== Plot ==
The plot is set in a fictional post mining boom town where drugs, unemployment, and desperation have become rife. A tech entrepreneur, Ryan Black, returns reluctantly to his hometown for his father's funeral. He gets reunited with his ex-con brother, Tyson. The plot also includes Isabella, a single mother played by Jessica McNamee. George Burgess plays a bouncer.

== Cast ==
- Ben Geurens as Ryan Black
- Nathaniel Dean as Tyson Black
- Malcolm Kennard as Stanley Black
- Jessica McNamee as Isabella
- Justin Rosniak as Benny
- Steve Le Marquand as Cain
- Damian Hill as Davo
- Andy McPhee as Jake
- Alan Dukes as McCrea
- Kenneth Moraleda as Aristotle
- Caroline Brazier as Dr Matheson
- Ryan Morgan as Caleb
- Peter Phelps as Sergeant Harvey
- George Burgess as Bouncer
