= Sample People =

- Directed by: Clinton Smith
- Starring: Kylie Minogue; Simon Lyndon
- Release date: 2000
- Country: Australia
- Language: English
- Box office: A$47,252 (Australia)

Sample People is a 2000 Australian film, directed by Clinton Smith. It is about the entanglements of twelve people in one weekend in Sydney.

The film was originally going to be made for $60,000 but prior to filming it was decided to seek more money. Despite being set in Sydney, it was shot in Adelaide.

== Plot ==
Within the film run multiple plot lines, with the plot and characters intersecting and influencing each other. The seemingly unrelated stories ultimately come together.

== Soundtrack ==
The soundtrack was released through Mushroom Records. The album peaked at number 38 on the ARIA Charts.

Festival Mushroom Records – D32146
No.	Title	Writer(s)	Vocals	Length
1.	"Space Theme (Score)"	Rafael May	Rafael May	1:41
2.	"Horror Movie"	Greg Macainsh	sonicanimation	3:11
3.	"Take a Long Line"	Doc Neeson, John Brewster, Rick Brewster	Grinspoon	3:09
4.	"Don't Change"	Garry Gary Beers, Andrew Farriss, Jon Farriss, Tim Farriss, Kirk Pengilly, Michael Hutchence	4 Star	4:19
5.	"Night For a Play (Score)"	Rafael May	Matthew Wilkinson	2:49
6.	"One Step Ahead"	Neil Finn	Kiley Gaffney	3:12
7.	"Gangsta Beats (Score)"	Rafael May	Rafael May	2:45
8.	"Sweet, Sweet Love"	Russell Morris	Russell Morris	4:16
9.	"Boy from the Stars"	Jim Keays	The Mavis's	4:27
10.	"I Like It Both Ways"	Chris Burnham, Joe Burnham, Gary Twinn, Randall Murphy	Not From There	3:47
11.	"Alone with You"	Jeremy Oxley	The Superjesus	2:57
12.	"Aja Aja"	Rafael May	Mintu Kumar, Nisha Bhasin	2:14
13.	"Discone"	Pnau	Pnau	4:36
14.	"Who Listens to the Radio"	Stephen Cummings, Andrew Pendlebury	The Whitlams	3:20
15.	"Howzat"	Garth Porter, Tony Mitchell	Custard	3:51
16.	"Space Shiva"	Rafael May	Inga Liljestrom	1:50
17.	"Gay Sex Guru"	Jimmy Street	Jimmy Street	2:55
18.	"The Real Thing"	Johnny Young	Kylie Minogue	3:18

=== Charts ===
Chart (2000)	Peak position
Australian Albums (ARIA)	38

== Cast ==
- Kylie Minogue as Jess
- Ben Mendelsohn as John
- Simon Lyndon as Andy
- David Field as TT
- Paula Arundell as Cleo
- Joel Edgerton as Sem
- Nathalie Roy as DJ Lush Puppy
- Nathan Page as Len
- Justin Rosniak as Joey
- Mathew Wilkinson as Gus
- Gandhi MacIntyre as Phil
- Dorian Nkono as Shiva

== Release ==
The film was given a limited theatrical release, opening in Sydney and Melbourne on 11 May 2000. It then had a release on home video on 27 September 2000.
