= Pawno =

- Film poster
- Directed by: Paul Ireland
- Written by: Damian Hill
- Produced by: Damian Hill; Paul Ireland
- Starring: John Brumpton; Damian Hill; Maeve Dermody; Malcolm Kennard; Mark Coles Smith
- Cinematography: Shelley Farthing-Dawe
- Edited by: Gary Woodyard
- Music by: Tristan Dewey; Tai Jordan
- Production companies: ROAR Digital; Toothless Pictures
- Distributed by: Mind Blowing Films
- Release dates: 5 August 2015 (Melbourne International Film Festival); 21 April 2016 (Australia)
- Running time: 89 minutes
- Country: Australia
- Language: English

Pawno is a 2015 Australian romantic comedy drama film set in the diverse and multicultural Melbourne suburb of Footscray. It was released in cinemas around Australia on 21 April 2016 by Mind Blowing World.

The film was directed by Paul Ireland from a script by Damian Hill. The two co-produced their debut feature film through their production company, Toothless Pictures. It stars John Brumpton, Kerry Armstrong, Maeve Dermody, Damian Hill, Mark Coles Smith and Malcolm Kennard.

The film premiered to critical success, and was the fastest-selling Australian film at the Melbourne International Film Festival 2015, finishing in the top 10 for the MIFF Audience Award. Film critic David Stratton, formerly of At the Movies, gave Pawno four stars in The Australian.

== Plot synopsis ==
Pawno is set in the multicultural suburb of Footscray, Victoria. A character-driven story, Pawno examines the intersecting lives of 14 local characters and their resident pawnbroker.

== Cast ==
- John Brumpton as Les Underwood
- Maeve Dermody as Kate
- Damian Hill as Danny Williams
- Malcolm Kennard as Carlo
- Mark Coles Smith as Pauly
- Kerry Armstrong as Jennifer Montgomery
- Tony Rickards as Harry
- Daniel Frederiksen as Paige Turner
- Brad McMurray as Jason Spears
- John Orcsik as Tony Robinson
- Peta Brady as Kylie
- Jesse Velik as Jay

== Production ==
The film was independently funded through a crowd-funding campaign, and was shortlisted for the $100,000 CinefestOz Film Prize.

== Reception ==
Pawno holds a 78% approval rating on Rotten Tomatoes.

Russell Marks in The Monthly gave the film a scathing review. "Australian cinema regularly produces better, funnier, more perceptive content than Pawno. The film's real quality is in its capacity to market both its multiculturalism and its localism, while reflecting a nostalgia among its audience for a mythic monoculture. Only about half the audience at the screening I was at were laughing, and a couple walked out partway through. I wanted to, but I also wanted to write about it."

=== Accolades ===
Award	Category	Recipients	Result
AACTA Awards (6th)	Best Original Screenplay	Damian Hill	Nominated
AACTA Awards (6th)	Best Actor	Damian Hill	Nominated
AACTA Awards (6th)	Best Actor	John Brumpton	Nominated
AACTA Awards (6th)	Best Actress	Maeve Dermody	Nominated
AACTA Awards (6th)	Best Supporting Actor	Mark Coles Smith	Nominated
AACTA Awards (6th)	Best Supporting Actress	Kerry Armstrong	Nominated
Antipodean Film Festival	Jury Grand Prix, Best Feature film	Paul Ireland	Won
AFCA Awards	Best Film	Paul Ireland	Nominated
AFCA Awards	Best Film	Damian Hill	Nominated
AFCA Awards	Best Screenplay	Damian Hill	Nominated
AFCA Awards	Best Actor	John Brumpton	Nominated
FCCA Awards	Best Script/Screenplay	Damian Hill	Nominated
FCCA Awards	Best Actor	John Brumpton	Nominated
FCCA Awards	Best Actress	Maeve Dermody	Nominated
FCCA Awards	Best Actor - Supporting Role	Mark Coles Smith	Nominated
FCCA Awards	Best Actress - Supporting Role	Kerry Armstrong	Nominated
Golden Trailer Awards	Best Independent Trailer	Toothless Pictures	Nominated
Melbourne International Film Festival	People's Choice Award for Best Narrative Feature	Paul Ireland	Nominated
Screen Music Awards, Australia	Best Original Song ("Those Friends of Mine")	Tristan Dewey and Tai Jordan	Nominated
Tallinn Black Nights Film Festival	Tridens Award for Best Music	Tristan Dewey and Tai Jordan	Won
