= Catching Milat =

2015 Australian television miniseries

Catching Milat is a two-part Australian television miniseries that screened on the Seven Network, in collaboration with Screen Australia on 17 and 24 May 2015. It is based on the 1998 book Sins of the Brother by Mark Whittaker and Les Kennedy and is loosely based upon the true story of how New South Wales Police and detectives under "Task Force Air" tracked down and caught serial killer Ivan Milat, who was responsible for the infamous backpacker murders.

== Critical response ==
Clive Small, a former assistant police commissioner, retired detective and now author, served as the investigation team head of "Task Force Air". He has criticised the program as a marginally fictionalised account, especially for overstating the role of Detective Paul Gordon.

== Main cast ==
- Richard Cawthorne as Detective Paul Gordon
- Geoff Morrell as Superintendent Clive Small
- Malcolm Kennard as Ivan Milat
- David Field as Detective Neil Birse
- Craig Hall as Detective Rodney Lynch
- Luke Ford as Detective Bob Godden
- Salvatore Coco as Detective Mark Camenzuli
- Leeanna Walsman as Shirley Soires
- Sacha Horler as Karen Milat
- Carole Skinner as Margaret Milat
- Fletcher Humphrys as Richard Milat
- Linda Ngo as Therese
- Alex Williams as Paul Onions
- Michael Denkha as Des Butler
- Helen Thomson as Dr Miriam Bentley
- Steve Le Marquand as Phil Polgasse
- Lucy Bell as Jill Walters
- John Brumpton as Artie Bigman

== Production ==
The series was produced by Shine Productions (as Shine Australia, a division of Shine Group), for Network Seven and directed by Peter Andrikidis and produced by Kerrie Mainwaring and Rory Callaghan in the pine forests of south-western Australia. It was written by Dalton Dartmouth.

== Reception ==
The first episode aired on 17 May 2015 at 8:50 on the Seven Network.

No.	Air date	Viewers (millions)	Nightly rank	Consolidated Viewers (millions)	Adjusted rank	Ref
1	Sunday, 17 May 2015	1,387	#2	1,626	#1	
2	Sunday, 24 May 2015	1,459	#1	1,686	#1	

== Home media ==
Catching Milat was Released on DVD and Blu-ray on 25 May 2015 with no bonus content, but the two part series episodes on the DVD run longer than the original aired episodes.

Title	Format	Ep #	Discs	Region 4/B (Australia)	Special features	Distributors
Catching Milat (Complete Series)	DVD/Blu-Ray	2	2	25 May 2015	None	Beyond Home Entertainment
