= Paul Ireland =

Scottish actor

- Born: 1970 (age 55–56); Ardrossan, Scotland
- Occupations: Actor, producer & director
- Spouse: Thea McLeod

Paul Ireland (born 1970) is a Scottish actor from Ardrossan, North Ayrshire, Scotland. He is best known for his role as Superintendent Duncan Hayes in Neighbours.

== Career ==
Ireland originally started off as a fishmonger in his father's shop in Greenock, Renfrewshire for five years before deciding to learn acting. In 1995, Ireland acted in the West End of London at the Ambassadors Theatre in a theatrical adaptation of the novel Trainspotting. During its run, the show won the Sunday Times Best New Play award.

During his career, Ireland has acted in numerous British television programmes such as Judge John Deed, Two Thousand Acres of Sky, The Bill and Midsomer Murders. In April 2011, he gained a role in Australian soap opera, Neighbours as Superintendent Duncan Hayes. Ireland was initially cast to play the role for thirteen episodes. Ireland made his debut in Neighbours in Episode 6183. In 2012, he also acted in Australian Broadcasting Corporation comedy, Outland after auditioning and meeting the writers, who told him that they wanted a British actor in the role in the programme. In 2013, Ireland made a return appearance on Neighbours as Duncan Hayes.

In 2006, Ireland appeared in the BBC History online interactive game CDX as MacKinnon, a Mithraist soldier.

In 2016, he co-produced and directed the Australian drama film Pawno.

Since 2018, Ireland appeared in the Australian AFL drama Playing for Keeps as Andrew Macleish, president of the Southern Jets football club.

== Personal life ==
Ireland is married to casting director Thea McLeod, with whom he has one son, actor Finn Ireland. He also has a daughter, Georgia Blue Ireland from his first marriage. After leaving Scotland, he moved to London for thirteen years before leaving the United Kingdom for Australia in 2009, where he currently resides.

== Filmography ==
| Year | Title | Role | Notes |
|---|---|---|---|
| 2024 | Fake | Niall Campbell | 1 episode |
| 2021 | New Gold Mountain (TV series) | Ramsey | 3 episodes |
| 2018 | Playing for Keeps (TV series) | Andrew MacLeish | 5 episodes |
| 2017 | HActresses | Louie MacGregor | 1 episode |
| 2017 | Sunshine | Senior Sgt Ian Sloane | 4 episodes |
| 2014 | Worst Year of my Life! Again! | Fireman | 1 episode |
| 2014 | Jack Irish: Dead Point | Artie | TV Movie |
| 2014 | INXS Never Tear us Apart | Lee James | 2 episodes |
| 2009-13 | Underbelly | Tony Eustance /Mr McBean/Tram Driver | 3 episodes |
| 2013 | Better Man | Wallace AFP | 1 episode |
| 2013 | Wentworth (TV series) | Tom O'Connor | 1 episode |
| 2011- | Neighbours | Duncan Hayes | 19 episodes |
| 2012 | Devil's Dust | Terry McCullagh | 2 episodes |
| 2012 | Howzat! Kerry Packer's War | Joel Parker | 2 episodes |
| 2012 | Outland | Andy | 6 episodes |
| 2011 | The Slap | Cooper Finch | 1 episode |
| 2011 | Underbelly Files: The Man who got Away | Percy Hole | TV Movie |
| 2009 | Rex | | TV Movie |
| 2009 | Rush | Boyd Kemper | 5 episodes |
| 2009 | City Homicide | Tony Miller | 1 episode |
| 2009 | Whatever Happened to that Guy? | Bruno Stephens | 8 episodes |
| 2009 | Dirt Game | Stu Strachan | 3 episodes |
| 2008 | The Children | Radio Producer | 3 episodes |
| 1995-08 | The Bill | David Fisher /Ian McKendrick/Joey Abbot | 4 episodes |
| 2006-08 | Little Miss Jocelyn | | 4 episodes |
| 2007 | Wedding Belles | Splash | TV Movie |
| 2004-07 | Doctors | Alan Meades/Alec Read | 2 episodes |
| 2006 | Midsomer Murders | Mark Castle | 1 episode |
| 2006 | Judge John Deed | Barry Page | 1 episode |
| 2005 | The Ghost Squad | Ian Sinclair | 1 episode |
| 2005 | Class of 76' | Andy | TV Movie |
| 1997-05 | Taggart | Duncan Stewart / Tyler Kennedy | 3 episodes |
| 2005 | Holby City | Cameron Taylor | 1 episode |
| 2005 | The Inspector Lynley Mysteries | Connor | 1 episode |
| 2004 | Rose and Maloney | Alan McCaffrey/Alan Turner | 2 episodes |
| 2004 | The Last Detective | McWatt | 1 episode |
| 1998-03 | Casualty (TV series) | Damian Yarrow/Chris Dempster/Ewen Campbell | 4 episodes |
| 2003 | Two Thousand Acres of Sky | Collin Campbell | 5 episodes |
| 2000 | Fish | Slater | 1 episode |
| 1999 | Liverpool 1 | Suez Tolliver | 1 episode |
| 1999 | Maisie Raine | Bondo Wilson | 1 episode |
| 1998 | Mosley | Alan Young | 2 episodes |

=== Film appearances ===
| Year | Title | Role | Notes |
|---|---|---|---|
| 1998 | B.Monkey | Barman | |
| 2013 | Blinder | Mr Wilton | |
| 2013 | The Turning | Mr Larwood | |
| 2014 | Coral | Coach | Short |
| 2016 | The Young Messiah | Optio | |
| 2017 | What if it Works? | Dr Mills | |
| 2019 | Judy and Punch | Ruffian | |
| 2022 | The King's Daughter (2022 film) | Benoit | |
