= AACTA Award for Best Performance in a Television Comedy =

Australian television award

Best Performance in a Television Comedy AACTA Award
- Country: Australia
- Presented by: Australian Academy of Cinema and Television Arts (AACTA)
- First award: 2006
- Currently held by: Shaun Micallef, Shaun Micallef's Mad as Hell (2013)
- Website: http://www.aacta.org

The AACTA Award for Best Performance in a Television Comedy is an accolade given by the Australian Academy of Cinema and Television Arts (AACTA), a non-profit organisation whose aim is to "identify, award, promote and celebrate Australia's greatest achievements in film and television." The award is handed out at the annual AACTA Awards, which rewards achievements in Australian feature film, television, documentaries and short films. From 1986 to 2010, the category was presented by the Australian Film Institute (AFI), the Academy's parent organisation, at the annual Australian Film Institute Awards (known as the AFI Awards). When the AFI launched the Academy in 2011, it changed the annual ceremony to the AACTA Awards, with the current prize being a continuum of the AFI Award for Best Performance in a Television Comedy.

From 2003 to 2005, the award was given as a joint award with drama performances under the category Best Actor in a Leading Role in a Television Drama or Comedy. However, comedy performances was separated from the drama categories in 2006, when the award for Best Performance in a Television Comedy was created. Chris Lilley and Phil Lloyd have won the award the most times with two wins each.

== Winners and nominees ==
In the following table, winners are listed first, in boldface and highlighted in gold; those listed below the winner that are not in boldface or highlighted are the nominees.

Winner

=== AFI Awards ===
Year	Nominee	Program	Character(s)	Series	Network
**2006** (48th)	**Andrew Hansen**	**The Chaser's War on Everything**	**Himself**	**Series 1**	**ABC**
2006 (48th)	Paul McCarthy	Comedy Inc: The Late Shift	Various^{[A]}	Series 4	Nine Network
2006 (48th)	Genevieve Morris	Comedy Inc: The Late Shift	Various^{[A]}	Series 4	Nine Network
2006 (48th)	Kris McQuade	Supernova	Professor Pip Cartwright	Series 2	UKTV
**2007** (49th)	**Adam Zwar**	**Wilfred**	**Adam**	**Series 1**	**SBS One**
2007 (49th)	Drew Forsythe	David Tench Tonight	David Tench	Series 1	Network Ten
2007 (49th)	Jason Gann	Wilfred	Wilfred	Series 1	SBS One
2007 (49th)	Peter Kowitz	Supernova	Max Talbot	Series 2	UKTV
**2008** (50th)	**Chris Lilley**	**Summer Heights High**	**Various**^{[B]}	–^{[C]}	**ABC**
2008 (50th)	Rob Carlton	Chandon Pictures	Tom Chandon	Series 1	Movie Extra
2008 (50th)	Robyn Butler	The Librarians	Frances O'Brien	Series 1	ABC
2008 (50th)	Rob Sitch	The Hollowmen	Tony	Series 1	ABC
**2009** (51st)	**Phil Lloyd**	**Review with Myles Barlow**	**Myles Barlow**	Series 1	**ABC**
2009 (51st)	Robyn Butler	The Librarians	Frances O'Brien	Series 2	ABC
2009 (51st)	Kim Gyngell	Very Small Business	Ray Leonard Leonard	Series 1	ABC1
2009 (51st)	Wayne Hope	Very Small Business	Don Angel	Series 1	ABC1
**2010** (52nd)	**Phil Lloyd**	**Review with Myles Barlow**	**Myles Barlow**	Series 2	**ABC**
2010 (52nd)	Paul Denny	Lowdown	Bob Geraghty	Series 1	SBS One
2010 (52nd)	Jason Gann	Wilfred	Wilfred	Series 2	SBS One

=== AACTA Awards ===
Year	Nominee	Program	Character(s)	Series	Network
**2011** (1st)	**Chris Lilley**	**Angry Boys**	Various^{[D]}	–^{[E]}	**ABC1**
2011 (1st)	Alison Bell	Laid	Roo McVie	Series 1	ABC1
2011 (1st)	Jess Harris	Twentysomething	Jess	Series 1	ABC2
2011 (1st)	Celia Pacquola	Laid	EJ	Series 1	ABC1
**2012** (2nd)	**Patrick Brammall**	**A Moody Christmas**	**Sean Moody**	Series 1	**ABC1**
2012 (2nd)	Barry Crocker	The Strange Calls	Gregor	Series 1	ABC2
2012 (2nd)	Damon Herriman	Laid	Marcus Dwyer	Series 2	ABC2
2012 (2nd)	Frank Woodley	Woodley	Woodley	Series 1	ABC1
**2013** (3rd)	**Shaun Micallef**	**Shaun Micallef's Mad as Hell**	**Himself**	**Series 2**	**ABC1**
2013 (3rd)	Lisa McCune	It's a Date	Em	–^{[F]}	ABC1
2013 (3rd)	Robyn Nevin	Upper Middle Bogan	Margaret Denyer	Series 1	ABC1
2013 (3rd)	Josh Thomas	Please Like Me	Josh	Series 1	ABC2
2014 (4th)	**Debra Lawrance**	**Please Like Me**	**Rose**	**Series 2**	**ABC2**
2014 (4th)	Patrick Brammall	The Moodys	Sean Moody	Series 1	ABC
2014 (4th)	Celia Pacquola	Utopia	Nat	Series 1	ABC1
2014 (4th)	Josh Thomas	Please Like Me	Josh	Series 2	ABC2
2015 (5th)	**Celia Pacquola**	**Utopia**	**Nat**	**Series 2**	**ABC1**
2015 (5th)	Nathan Lovejoy	Sammy J & Randy in Ricketts Lane	Borkman	Series 1	ABC1
2015 (5th)	Randy	Sammy J & Randy in Ricketts Lane	Randy	Series 1	ABC1
2015 (5th)	Emily Taheny	Shaun Micallef's Mad as Hell	various	Series 5	ABC2
2016 (6th)	**Patrick Brammall**	**No Activity**	Detective Hendy	Series 1	**Stan**
2016 (6th)	Alison Bell	ABC Comedy Showroom – The Letdown	Audrey	-	ABC1
2016 (6th)	Fiona Choi	The Family Law	Jenny Law	Series 1	SBS
2016 (6th)	Leah Purcell	Black Comedy	various	Series 2	ABC1

== See also ==
- AACTA Award for Best Television Comedy Series
- AACTA Awards

== Notes ==
A^{1} ^{2} : Comedy Inc: The Late Shift is a sketch comedy television series with various characters in each episode.
B: In Summer Heights High, Chris Lilley portrayed the three main characters: Ja'mie King, Mr G and Jonah Takalua.
C: Summer Heights High is a mockumentary, and therefore only one season was aired.
D: In Angry Boys, Chris Lilley portrayed the main characters: Daniel and Nathan Sims, S.mouse, Jen Okazaki, Gran and Blake Oakfield.
E: Angry Boys is a mockumentary, and therefore only one season was aired.
F: Lisa McCune was nominated for her performance in the first episode of It's a Date titled, "When Should You Abandon A Date?"
