= Population 11 =

Australian television series

- Genre: Comedy-drama; Crime thriller Dark comedy
- Created by: Phil Lloyd
- Inspired by: disappearance of Paddy Moriarty
- Written by: Phil Lloyd; Michael Bond; Steve Toltz; Julia Moriarty; Sarinah Masukor; Zoe Pepper
- Directed by: Trent O'Donnell; Ben Young; Helena Brooks
- Creative director: Trent O'Donnell
- Starring: Ben Feldman; Perry Mooney; Katrina Milosevic; Darren Gilshenan
- Country of origin: Australia
- Original language: English
- No. of series: 1
- No. of episodes: 12

Production
- Executive producers: Trent O'Donnell; Phil Lloyd; Ben Feldman; Chloe Rickard; Jason Burrows
- Producers: Bridget Callow-Wright; Melissa Kelly
- Production location: Kimberley, Western Australia
- Cinematography: Kieran Fowler
- Running time: 30 minutes
- Production company: Jungle Entertainment Factor 30 Films

Original release
- Network: Stan
- Release: March 14, 2024

Population 11 is a comedy drama television series that premiered on the Australian streaming service Stan on 14 March 2024. Created by Phil Lloyd and starring Ben Feldman, it is inspired by the 2017 disappearance of Paddy Moriarty in the Northern Territory; it centres on Feldman's character attempting to solve the disappearance of his estranged father from a small town in the Australian outback home to only a dozen residents, who all end up as suspects.

== Cast ==
- Ben Feldman as Andy Pruden, "a suburban bank teller from Ohio"
- Perry Mooney as Cassie Crick, an 'outsider' who "comes to Andy's aid", "they find themselves in increasing danger as they delve into the secrets" of the town.
- Katrina Milosevic as Sgt. Geraldine Walters
- Darren Gilshenan as Hugo Drivas, Andy's missing father
- Chai Hansen as Gareth Biggins
- Stephen Curry as Noel Pinkus
- Tony Briggs as Jimmy James
- Genevieve Lemon as Valerie Hogarth
- Rick Donald as Leon Croydman
- Pippa Grandison as Maureen Taylor
- Steve Le Marquand as Trevor Taylor
- William Zappa as Cedric Blumenthal
- Emily Taheny as Audrey Denning
- Karis Oka as Shoshanna Ling
- Fiona Choi as Charmaine Ling
- Sachin Joab as Petey P
- Ethan Gosatti as Rory Roberts
- Chris Kirby as Dom

== Episodes ==
There were twelve 30-minute episodes, all premiered on 14 March 2024.

No.	Title	Directed by	Written by	Original release date
1	"Outback UFO Tours"	Trent O'Donnell	Phil Lloyd	March 14, 2024
2	"Stray Dogs"	Trent O'Donnell	Phil Lloyd	March 14, 2024
3	"Who's Jeff"	Trent O'Donnell	Steve Toltz	March 14, 2024
4	"Sweet 'N' Sour Dingo"	Trent O'Donnell	Michael Bond	March 14, 2024
5	"Confession"	Ben Young	Julia Moriarty	March 14, 2024
6	"Bunker"	Ben Young	Michael Bond	March 14, 2024
7	"Earth Room"	Ben Young	Sarinah Masukor	March 14, 2024
8	"The Sea"	Ben Young	Michael Bond	March 14, 2024
9	"Trivia Night"	Helena Brooks	Zoe Pepper	March 14, 2024
10	"Like Father Like Son"	Helena Brooks	Steve Toltz	March 14, 2024
11	"Desert Pearls"	Helena Brooks	Phil Lloyd	March 14, 2024
12	"The Scorpion and the Frog"	Helena Brooks	Phil Lloyd	March 14, 2024

== Production ==
In 2022, Stan entered an "originals development partnership" with studio Lionsgate, which included the development of what was originally entitled Population: 11 as one of the first three titles to emerge from the deal. It is the second programme, following Prosper, to be co-commissioned by Stan and Lionsgate.

The series is produced by Jungle Entertainment in association with Factor 30 Films, with major production investment from Screenwest, Lotterywest and the Western Australian Regional Screen Fund (WARSF), development supported by Stan, financially supported by Screen NSW, and international distribution handled by Lionsgate.

Nine News reported that the series' similarity to the story of the disappearance of Moriarty can be found in that both the town in which he disappeared from (Larrimah), and the town depicted in the series, both had a dozen residents - which fell to 11 - at the time, and so all "residents in the area became suspects in an ongoing police investigation".

Executive producers Lloyd and O'Donnell last worked together on The Moodys.

=== Filming ===
The show was filmed entirely in the Kimberley in Western Australia, with production commencing in mid-2023 "based out of" Derby. It is the first Stan original to be filmed in Western Australia to be shown on the platform.

== Broadcast ==
Ahead of the series' launch on 14 March 2024, a first-look trailer was released on 31 January 2024.

A premiere screening of the series was held in Luna Leederville in Perth on 10 March 2024, with many leading cast and crew in attendance.

== Accolades ==
Rose d'Or Awards
Year	Category	Nominee	Result	Ref
2024	Comedy Drama & Sitcom	Population 11	Nominated	

CGA Awards
Year	Category	Nominee	Result	Ref
2024	Best Casting in a TV Comedy	Population 11	Nominated	

Logie Awards
Year	Category	Nominee	Result	Ref
2024	Best Scripted Comedy Program	Population 11	Nominated	
2024	Best Lead Actor in a Comedy	Ben Feldman	Nominated	
