= How to Stay Married =

Australian comedy show

- Genre: Comedy; Drama
- Created by: Peter Helliar
- Written by: Peter Helliar; Nick Musgrove; Trent Roberts
- Directed by: Natalie Bailey; Amanda Brotchie; Colin Cairnes; Mat King; Peter Helliar; Fiona Banks
- Starring: Peter Helliar; Lisa McCune; Darren Gilshenan; Nikki Britton; Phil Lloyd; Willow Ryan-Fuller; Vivien Turner
- Composer: Kit Warhurst
- Country of origin: Australia
- Original language: English
- No. of series: 3
- No. of episodes: 24

Production
- Executive producers: Emma Fitzsimons; Andrea Denholm; Peter Helliar; Paul Leadon; Rick Maier
- Producers: Jess Leslie; Pennie Brown; Jenni Tosi
- Production locations: Melbourne, Victoria
- Camera setup: Multi-camera
- Running time: 23 minutes
- Production companies: Princess Pictures; Pablo Productions

Original release
- Network: Network 10
- Release: 8 November 2018 – present

Related
- It's a Date

How to Stay Married is an Australian television comedy series screening on Network 10. It premiered on 8 November 2018. The series is a spin-off of an episode of the 2013 anthology comedy series It's a Date on the ABC. The show is a Princess Pictures and Pablo Pictures co-production.

The show was renewed for a second season on 22 August 2018, before the first episode aired. All episodes of season 2 were initially released on streaming service 10 Play on March 26, 2020 for two weeks as part of Network Ten's "10 Shows in 10 Days" promotion during the COVID-19 pandemic. It later premiered on Network Ten on Tuesday, 5 May 2020. A third season premiered on May 4, 2021.

== Plot ==
After fifteen years of marriage, the lives of Greg and Em Butler and their two daughters change when Em returns to work, Greg is made redundant and his brother Brad moves in.

== Cast ==
=== Main cast ===
- Peter Helliar as Greg Butler
- Lisa McCune as Em Butler
- Darren Gilshenan as Terry Roach
- Nikki Britton as Marlo Machelski
- Phil Lloyd as Brad Butler
- Willow Ryan-Fuller as Sophie Butler
- Vivien Turner as Chloe Butler

=== Recurring cast ===
- Nicki Wendt as Nadia
- Judith Lucy as Audrey Price
- Michael Denkha as Amir Essa
- Keith Brockett as Dean
- Geraldine Hickey as Janice
- Casey Donovan as Luna Keys
- Sun Park as Vanessa
- Maria Angelico as Verity
- Emily Taheny as Claire
- Michael Brotz as Clyde
- Lucy Durack as Beryl Deep
- Ranveer Harsh as Ravi
- Alyssa Ktistakis as Lindsay
- Damian Chakhvorostov as Ivan
- Brett Molloy as Damian
- Joey Vieira as Carlos Garcia
- Adam Gilchrist as Himself

=== Guests ===
- Bernard Curry as Adam
- Christopher Kirby as Luke Garrison
- Elaine Crombie as Carol
- Georgina Naidu as Principal Vencat
- Julie Nihill as Mrs Veteris
- Marta Kaczmarek as Tina
- Nicholas Bell as Brian
- Steve Bastoni as Lenny
- Steve Bisley as Stuart
- Tom Budge as Dale

=== Main characters ===
List indicators
- A green cell indicates the actor as a main cast member.
- A red cell indicates the actor as a recurring cast member.
- A blue cell indicates the actor as guest cast member.
- A grey cell indicates the actor has not participated in the respective season.

Actor	Character	Seasons		
Actor	Character	1	2	3
Peter Helliar	Greg Butler			
Lisa McCune	Em Butler			
Willow Ryan-Fuller	Sophie Butler			
Vivien Turner	Chloe Butler			
Phil Lloyd	Brad Butler			
Darren Gilshenan	Terry Roach			
Nikki Britton	Marlo Machelski			
Judith Lucy	Audrey Price			
Nicki Wendt	Nadia			
Ranveer Harsh	Ravi Sharma			
Alyssa Ktistakis	Lindsay			
Casey Donovan	Luna Keys			
Adam Gilchrist	Himself			
Broden Kelly	Brayden			

== Episodes ==
=== Series overview ===
Series	Episodes	Originally released	
Series	Episodes	First released	Last released
1	8	8 November 2018	20 December 2018
2	8	5 May 2020	23 June 2020
3	8	4 May 2021	22 June 2021

=== Season 1 (2018) ===
No. overall	No. in season	Title	Directed by	Written by	Original release date	Viewers
1	1	"Episode 1"	Natalie Bailey	Peter Helliar	8 November 2018	508,000
After fourteen years at home raising the kids, Em Butler is worried she has become boring and decides it’s time to go back to work. Her husband Greg is initially hesitant to disrupt the status quo but when redundancies are offered at his job, he starts to wonder whether a change might be good for them. Greg’s brother Brad announces that he needs to stay with them for an undisclosed amount of time, throwing yet another spanner into the works.
2	2	"Episode 2"	Natalie Bailey	Peter Helliar	15 November 2018	507,000
Greg and Em have planned an evening together at an Ed Sheeran concert, their first night out since Em got her new job and Greg lost his. Greg and Em each harbour little frustrations about the demarcation of domestic responsibilities and despite their best efforts to be romantic, there is friction during the date. Sophie is allowed to babysit for the first time (with Terry and Marlo instructed to keep an eye out from across the road), but things go from bad to worse when the power goes out.
3	3	"Episode 3"	Natalie Bailey	Peter Helliar & Nick Musgrove	22 November 2018	264,000
Greg and Em are frustrated by their flagging sex life. Since starting work, Em’s sex drive has dropped and the hassle of using condoms isn’t helping. Terry recommends that Greg have a vasectomy to simplify the contraception, and Marlo recommends that Em do something dangerous (like skydiving) to kick-start her libido. But as their initial excitement fades, the seriousness of their respective tasks starts to sink in.
4	4	"Episode 4"	Natalie Bailey	Peter Helliar & Nick Musgrove	29 November 2018	291,000
Greg and Em become worried about Sophie when she announces out of the blue that she wants to quit her basketball team. Greg, the coach of the team, has been so focused on winning that he has failed to notice that Sophie hasn’t scored a single point all season, and resolves that she will score in the next game no matter what. Em regrets that she hasn’t been around enough since going back to work and resolves to make it to the game to cheer Sophie on, but gets trapped in a well-known author’s impromptu adult fiction reading.
5	5	"Episode 5"	Colin Cairnes	Peter Helliar & Trent Roberts	6 December 2018	N/A
The Butler family is running seriously low on personal space, a problem that becomes impossible to ignore when Brad brings a date over for the first time. Greg and Em decide that Brad needs to move into the backyard cubby house so that the girls can have their own rooms back. With hard rubbish collection coming up, they get to work clearing out the mountain of 'storage’ in the cubby - but while Em has no problem chucking stuff away, Greg gets increasingly sentimental over all of their old things.
6	6	"Episode 6"	Colin Cairnes	Peter Helliar & Nick Musgrove	13 December 2018	281,000
Greg and Em attend Em’s 25 year high school reunion. Greg is determined to 'be cool’ with meeting Em’s significant high school ex-boyfriend while Em looks forward to flaunting her new job to her classmates. However, Greg is 'cool’ with the wrong person, accidentally encouraging the school heartthrob to flirt with Em. When a teacher undermines Em’s publishing career by suggesting that a poem she wrote at school was plagiarised, she becomes determined to clear her name.
7	7	"Episode 7"	Colin Cairnes	Peter Helliar & Trent Roberts	20 December 2018	272,000
Greg and Em implement a screen ban to give the family a much-needed break from technology. Em takes Chloe on a 'girls day’ in the great outdoors but between interruptions from Brad and the interference of a drone pilot, the bonding activities don’t go to plan. Greg drives Sophie to her friend’s 'gathering’, intending to have a conversation in the car about the boy she likes, but he struggles to navigate without GPS and they get seriously lost.
8	8	"Episode 8"	Peter Helliar	Peter Helliar & Nick Musgrove	20 December 2018	272,000
It’s Greg and Em’s fifteen year wedding anniversary and Em has planned a weekend away at a surprise destination. Greg is disappointed to find that the destination is a roadside motel that they visited when they were first dating, a gesture that Em considers extremely romantic. Em is equally let down by Greg’s gift of celebratory home brew beer. Sophie decides it’s time for Brad to get back on his feet and coaches him to make a good impression on a woman he likes - an Uber driver who ruined Terry and Marlo’s perfect rating.

=== Season 2 (2020) ===
No. overall	No. in season	Title	Directed by	Written by	Original release date	Viewers
9	1	"Episode 1"	Amanda Brotchie	Vanessa Burt & Peter Helliar	5 May 2020	441,000
Envious of not being considered "the cool house" where kids like to hang out, Greg and Em encourage Sophie to have her friends over, promising not to embarrass her.
10	2	"Episode 2"	Amanda Brotchie	Nick Musgrove & Peter Helliar	12 May 2020	439,000
When Brad announces his plans to propose to new flame Nadia, Greg and Em seize the opportunity to right the wrongs of their own botched proposal seventeen years earlier.
11	3	"Episode 3"	Amanda Brotchie	Nick Musgrove	19 May 2020	428,000
Greg hatches a 'foolproof' plan to earn funds for his promised family holiday on a cruise by selling TurboMax mixers to his neighbours and family. Em brings Chloe to work for Curriculum Day and scores a book deal from her boss Audrey, about her relationship with her "neanderthal" husband, after Chloe lets slip that her mum likes to write.
12	4	"Episode 4"	Peter Helliar	Peter Helliar	26 May 2020	400,000
When Em's pompous father and stepmother come over for a family BBQ, Greg attempts to ask them for money for their family holiday while Em stokes the fires of familial conflict, under the guidance of her boss Audrey, for her new book.
13	5	"Episode 5"	Sarah Lang & Peter Helliar	Mat King	2 June 2020	428,000
Greg has to wait at home for the NBN technician but he is tempted from his post by his brother, who asks him to visit the supermarket for a once-in-a-lifetime Aldi special buy: a The Slumberwell: Endless Dream bed which Em wants. His absence means that all the family's problems fall in her lap.
14	6	"Episode 6"	Trent Roberts	Mat King	9 June 2020	407,000
After a sobering cyber-safety information night, Greg and Em Butler decide to install a secret surveillance app on Sophie's phone and are shocked to discover her sexting with a friend, Ravi, from school.
15	7	"Episode 7"	Lou Sanz	Peter Helliar	16 June 2020	425,000
Em's determined to finally tell Greg about the book that she is writing about him. An unexpected dinner invitation by Carlos Garcia has Em taking drastic actions to prevent Greg from finding out about it in the wrong way.
16	8	"Episode 8"	Peter Helliar	Mat King	23 June 2020	423,000
As Greg and Em try to resolve their tension over Em's book, the Butler household prepares for Brad and Nadia's wedding.

=== Season 3 (2021) ===
No. overall	No. in season	Title	Directed by	Written by	Original release date	Viewers
17	1	"Episode 1"	Fiona Banks	Peter Helliar	4 May 2021	247,000
Greg spies an older boy eating Chloe's lunch and instantly concludes his daughter is being bullied. Greg's determined to seek justice, which brings him into direct conflict with perfect parent Luna Keys.
18	2	"Episode 2"	Fiona Banks	Trent Roberts	11 May 2021	272,000
Greg's on a mission to procure the most prizes for the school's trivia night and to outshine rival parent Luna in the process, but when he also has to deal with a sleep-deprived Chloe, his mission seems impossible. Em learns of her "lucrative" book deal from Audrey — as the ghostwriter of Adam "Gilly" Gilchrist's autobiography.
19	3	"Episode 3"	Fiona Banks	Sarah Lang	18 May 2021	N/A
At the school's dry trivia night, Greg's rivalry with Luna heats up and Em disrupts the evening's proceedings by unwittingly orchestrating a rival event in the school's car park.
20	4	"Episode 4"	Peter Helliar	Vidya Rajan and Peter Helliar	25 May 2021	N/A
Greg has never been able to talk about death and the passing of Chloe's pet is no exception. Em challenges Greg to discuss their own inevitable funerals only to find they're on very different pages.
21	5	"Episode 5"	Mat King	Nick Musgrove	1 June 2021	N/A
Greg is desperate to prove he's cleaner and greener than Luna, but when he posts an innocent photo on the school's social media platform, he starts an online war that could see him cancelled.
22	6	"Episode 6"	Mat King	Sarah Lang and Vidya Rajan	8 June 2021	N/A
Em has a sex dream that inspires her to become more experimental in the bedroom, but after eighteen years of marriage, how does she tell Greg she's suddenly keen to expand their repertoire?
23	7	"Episode 7"	Mat King	Vanessa Burt	15 June 2021	N/A
Em is adamant the controversial material she's uncovered about Gilly will result in a bestseller, but when Gilly prematurely promotes the book on television, it creates a public relations nightmare.
24	8	"Episode 8"	Mat King	Peter Helliar	22 June 2021	N/A
Greg's ongoing battle with Luna comes to a head when he makes the bold decision to oust her as President of the Parent and Friends Committee.
