= Jungle Entertainment =

Australian television and film production company

- Industry: Television, film
- Founded: 2002
- Headquarters: Building 20, 38 Driver Avenue, Sydney, Australia
- Number of locations: Sydney, Los Angeles
- Area served: World Wide
- Key people: Jason Burrows, Chloe Rickard, Trent O'Donnell, and Phil Lloyd.
- Website: https://www.jungleentertainment.com

Jungle Entertainment is a production company owned by executive producer Jason Burrows, Writer/Director Trent O'Donnell, writer/performer Phil Lloyd and executive producer Chloe Rickard. The Sydney-based company produces television programs in Australia and the US, specialising in premium drama and comedy. In 2026, Jungle Entertainment won the Screen Producers of Australia Award for Australian Production Company of the Year and the Screen Business Export Award, for the second year running.

== Productions ==
Title	Network	Years	Notes
My Brilliant Career	Netflix	2026	
Good Cop/Bad Cop	Stan, The CW, The Roku Channel	2025	
He Had It Coming	Stan, Fifth Season	2025	
Sunny Nights	Stan, Hulu	2025	
Population 11	Stan, Lionsgate Studios	2024	
Big Deal	Madman Entertainment, ABC	2021	
Wakefield	ABC, Showtime, BBC Studios	2021	
Bad Mothers	Nine Network, Sundance Now	2019	
Mr. Inbetween	FX	2018–2021	
No Activity	CBS All Access, Paramount+	2018–2021	
Squinters	ABC	2018–2019	
Sando	ABC	2018	
Here Come the Habibs	Nine Network	2016–2017	
No Activity	Stan	2015–2018	
Between a Frock and a Hard Place	ABC	2015	
The Moodys	ABC	2014	
The Elegant Gentleman's Guide to Knife Fighting	ABC	2013	Co-production with ABC
Problems	ABC	2012	
A Moody Christmas	ABC	2012	
Review with Myles Barlow	ABC	2008–2010	

== The World's Most Remade Australian Producer ==
No Activity. The Moodys. Review with Myles Barlow. No other Australian production company has had more scripted formats remade internationally.

== Awards ==
In 2026, Jungle Entertainment won the Screen Producers of Australia Award for Australian Production Company of the Year and the Screen Business Export Award, for the second year running.

Good Cop/Bad Cop was honoured at the 64th annual Monte-Carlo Television Festival with the jury's Special Prize for Cast, including for actors Leighton Meester and Luke Cook.

For comedy TV work, Jungle's Director awards include Best Comedy AFIs, Best Director at ADGA, Best Narrative Comedy at AWGIE and Best Ensemble Comedy (Equity).

Jungle won Breakthrough Business of The Year at the 2013 Screen Producers Australia Awards with the comedy The Moodys being nominated for Best Comedy at the Monte Carlo TV Awards. Jungle directors have won multiple local and international advertising awards including Gold Lions at Cannes, Gold Promax, Yellow Pencil, Oneshow, Clio and AWARD awards.
