= Rachel Gordon =

Australian actress

- Born: 10 May 1976 (age 50); Brisbane, Queensland, Australia
- Education: National Institute of Dramatic Art (NIDA) (1997)
- Occupation: Actress
- Years active: 1997–present
- Spouse(s): Scott Johnson (2005–2009); Jon Sivewright (? -?)
- Children: 2

Rachel Gordon (born 10 May 1976) is an Australian actress.

== Early life ==
Gordon was born in Brisbane, Australia, the daughter of Michael and Donna Gordon. Her great-grandfather was Prime Minister Joseph Lyons, and her great-grandmother was Dame Enid Lyons, who was the first woman in the Australian parliament. Gordon is a 1997 graduate of the National Institute of Dramatic Art (NIDA) in Sydney.

== Career ==
After her graduation from NIDA, Gordon appeared on stage in numerous productions. She has since worked for most of Australia's major theatre companies, including Bell Shakespeare, Melbourne Theatre Company, Sydney Theatre Company, Queensland Theatre Company, Ensemble Theatre and Marian Street Theatre.

Gordon's first television role was in medical drama All Saints playing the recurring role of Claudia McKenzie from 2000 to 2001. She then played Detective Senior Constable Amy Fox in long-running police procedural television show Blue Heelers, from 2004 to 2006. She starred in long-running soap opera Neighbours in 2007, playing Charlotte Stone. She followed this with a recurring role in soap opera Home and Away, playing Jazz Curtis, the estranged mother of Drew Curtis from 2007 to 2008.

Gordon appeared in a recurring capacity in the mystery drama thriller Winter as Melanie Winter from 2010 to 2015. During this time, she also starred in comedy series The Moodys in a main role as Bridget Quaill, from 2012 to 2014, reprising the role in A Moody Christmas.

In 2016, Gordon began appearing alongside Jessica Mauboy in Seven Network drama series The Secret Daughter playing Susan Norton until 2017. The following year she had a main role as Bridget Kovacec in comedy series Back in Very Small Business.

In 2022, Gordon appeared in drama series The Twelve for four episodes, as Emily Cavanaugh, opposite Sam Neill and Brendan Cowell. In 2023, she starred as fictional Australian Prime Minister Rebecca Stewart in the BBC sitcom Queen of Oz, created by English comedian Catherine Tate.

Gordon's television guest appearances include Big Sky (1997), White Collar Blue (2002), Farscape (2003), The Cooks (2005) The Elegant Gentleman's Guide to Knife Fighting (2013), Playing for Keeps (2019) and Made in Rhode Island (2020). Her most recent television appearance was in an episode of the anthology series Erotic Stories in 2023.

Gordon's film credits include Thunderstruck (2004) opposite Sam Worthington, mockumentary comedy Razzle Dazzle: A Journey into Dance (2007) and Australian-American psychological thriller Angel of Mine (2019) alongside Luke Evans, Noomi Rapace and fellow Australian Yvonne Strahovski. She has also appeared in the made-for-television movies Never Tell Me Never (1998) as Angela, Comedy Showroom: The Letdown (2016) as Mandy.

== Personal life ==
Gordon lived in a share house with fellow actor Ian Stenlake and other students, while she was studying at NIDA.

In late 2004, Gordon married her partner of 11 years, actor Scott Johnson, whom she met at NIDA. They divorced in 2009.

She later married actor Jon Sivewright, whom she met on the set of Home and Away. Together they have two children but they have since separated.

Gordon was trained by Al Gore and the Australian Conservation Foundation as a presenter for The Climate Change Project in 2007.

In 2008, she walked the Great Wall of China with other celebrities in an effort to raise money for Olivia Newton-John's Cancer and Wellness Centre.

== Filmography ==
=== Film ===
Year	Title	Role	Notes
2004	Thunderstruck	Molly	
2004	A Whole New You	Woman in Middle Management	Short film
2007	Razzle Dazzle: A Journey into Dance	Vomit Child's Mother	
2019	Angel of Mine	Ellen	

=== Television ===
Year	Title	Role	Notes
1997	Big Sky	Tara Brown / Lisa	"Wishing and Hoping"
1998	Never Tell Me Never	Angela	TV film
2000–2001	All Saints	Claudia McKenzie	Recurring role
2002	White Collar Blue	Mardi Peters	"1.12"
2003	Farscape	Lo'Laan	"Mental as Anything"
2004–2006	Blue Heelers	Amy Fox	Main role
2005	The Cooks	Annette	"Sticky"
2007	Neighbours	Dr. Charlotte Stone	Recurring role
2007–2008	Home and Away	Jazz Curtis	Recurring role
2012	The Moodys	Bridget Quaill	Main role
2012	A Moody Christmas	Bridget Quaill	Main role
2013	The Elegant Gentleman's Guide to Knife Fighting	Special Guest	"1.1", "1.2", "1.3"
2014	The Moodys	Bridget Quaill	Main role
2010–15	Winter	Melanie Winter	Recurring role
2016	Comedy Showroom: The Letdown	Mandy	TV movie
2016–2017	The Secret Daughter	Susan Norton	12 episodes
2018	Back in Very Small Business	Bridget Kovacec	Main Role
2019	Playing for Keeps	Narelle Baxter	"2.5"
2020	Made in Rhode Island	Girl at The Bar	Pilot
2022	The Twelve	Emily Cavanaugh	4 episodes
2023	Queen of Oz	Rebecca Stewart	6 episodes
2023	Erotic Stories	Sandra	1 episode

== Theatre ==
Year	Title	Role	Notes
1997	Death Defying Acts	Juliet	Marian St Theatre, Sydney
1997	Macbeth	Lady Macduff	Bell Shakespeare
1998	Out There	Sasha	Hair of the Dog
1998	Light Particles	Beth	Griffin Theatre Company, Sydney
1998	All Things Considered	Laura	Marian St Theatre, Sydney
1999	The Taming of the Shrew	Bianca	Sydney Botanic Gardens with EHJ Productions
1999	Last Nights of Ballyhoo	Sunny Freitag	Marian St Theatre, Sydney
1999	Big Hair in America	Reba	HotHouse Theatre
2000	Wit	Susie Monoghan / RN & BSN	Ensemble Theatre, Sydney
2001	Crimes of the Heart	Meg Magrath	Marian St Theatre, Sydney
2001	Don Juan	Charlotte	STC
2008	Boeing Boeing	Gabriella	New Theatricals
2009	Concussion		STC / Griffin Theatre Company
2009	Ninety	Isabel	MTC / QTC
2010	King Lear	Regan / Jane	Bell Shakespeare
2010	Let the Sunshine	Emma	MTC / QTC
2012	Managing Carmen	Jessica	Ensemble Theatre, Sydney
2012	Between Two Waves	Grenelle	Griffin Theatre Company
2014	Daylight Saving	Felicity	Darlinghurst Theatre Company, Sydney
2015	Boston Marriage	Claire	QPAC, Brisbane & QLD regional tour with QTC
2016	Jasper Jones	Mrs Bucktin	MTC
2017	Odd Man Out	Various characters	Ensemble Theatre, Sydney
2018	The Norman Conquests Trilogy	Ruth	Ensemble Theatre, Sydney
