= No Activity (American TV series) =

U.S. comedy television series

- Genre: Comedy
- Based on: No Activity by Trent O'Donnell
- Developed by: Trent O'Donnell; Patrick Brammall
- Directed by: Trent O'Donnell
- Starring: Patrick Brammall; Tim Meadows; Amy Sedaris; Sunita Mani; Jesse Plemons; Jason Mantzoukas; Arturo Castro; Adrian Martinez; Cristin Milioti
- Opening theme: "Happiness, Missouri" by EL VY
- Composers: Ex-Hell; Matt Blackman
- Country of origin: United States
- Original language: English
- No. of seasons: 4
- No. of episodes: 32

Production
- Executive producers: Trent O'Donnell; Patrick Brammall; Will Ferrell; Adam McKay; Joe Farrell; Jason Burrows; Joe Hardesty
- Producer: Ashley Chang
- Cinematography: Judd Overton; Gena Fridman
- Editors: Paul Swain; Adam Lichtenstein; Hallie Faben-Comfort
- Running time: 25–33 minutes
- Production companies: Funny or Die; Gary Sanchez Productions; Jungle Entertainment; Flight School Studio (season 4); CBS Studios

Original release
- Network: Paramount+ (Note: Known as CBS All Access from 2017–2019.)
- Release: November 12, 2017 – May 27, 2021

No Activity is an American comedy television series, based on the Australian series of the same name created by Trent O'Donnell, that premiered on November 12, 2017, on CBS All Access. The series was developed by O'Donnell and Patrick Brammall, both of whom executive produce alongside Will Ferrell, Adam McKay, Joe Farrell, Jason Burrows, and Joe Hardesty. In February 2018, it was announced that the series had been renewed for a second season, which premiered on November 22, 2018. In March 2019, CBS All Access renewed the series for a third season which premiered on November 21, 2019.

In October 2020, the series was renewed for a fourth season, in which the series switched to a computer animation format. The season premiered on April 8, 2021. In January 2023, the series was removed from Paramount+.

== Premise ==
No Activity's first series is "set against the world of a major drug cartel bust" and follows "two low-level cops who have spent far too much time in a car together; two criminals who are largely kept in the dark; two dispatch workers who haven't really clicked; and two Mexican tunnelers who are in way too small a space considering they've only just met."

The second and third series juxtapose the double parings, the pair of cops, and a pair of criminals - as well as expanding on the relationships within the dispatch center. In the second series, the El Chapo connection acquires an over exuberant FBI agent involved in the case, and his perspective on matters. Cameos are more frequent.

The third series revolves around the demoted officers, from detectives to patrol, and the cleanup of the El Chapo events and the FBI agent. The patrol car features more cameos, and there is a general resistance to robotic replacements introduced to the dispatch center and other areas of life.

== Cast and characters ==
=== Main ===
- Patrick Brammall as Nick Cullen, a police detective
- Tim Meadows as Judd Tolbeck, a police detective
- Amy Sedaris as Janice Delongpre, a dispatch officer
- Sunita Mani as Fatima Khorasani, a dispatch officer
- Jesse Plemons as Angus (season 1)
- Jason Mantzoukas as Dustin Kasprowicz, an undercover FBI agent who goes by the name Marco
- Arturo Castro as Miguel (season 1)
- Adrian Martinez as Roberto (season 1)
- Cristin Milioti as Frankie (season 2)
- Dylan McDermott as Clint Bergman (season 3)
- George Basil as Gary (season 3)
- Angus Sampson as Chief (season 3)

=== Recurring ===
- Will Ferrell as Adrian
- Nina Pedrad as Helen
- Bob Odenkirk as Greg, a port security officer
- Darren Gilshenan as Tony
- Chris Gethard as Zach Ataque, a dispatch officer
- Matt Walsh as Larry Turnbull
- Jack Axelrod as Steve
- Alexandra Rodriguez as Gabriella
- Jake Johnson as Josh Haldeman, a special agent for the DEA
- J. K. Simmons as Leon Fordham, an internal affairs senior detective
- John Leary
- Max Greenfield as Cotric
- Joe Manganiello as Dugan
- Keegan-Michael Key as Charles Brock
- Joe Keery as Officer Ed Reinhardt

=== Guest ===
- Mackenzie Davis as Pat the Rat ("The Metric System")
- Bridget Everett as Bonnie Lehman ("Golden Age of Tunnels"), a special agent for the DEA
- Michaela Watkins as Erin Saunders ("Golden Age of Tunnels"), an internal affairs detective
- Courtenay Taylor as Officer Eastman ("The Raid")
- Jessica Alba as The Actress ("The Actress")
- Harriet Dyer as Hazel ("The Actress")
- Nasim Pedrad ("Honesty & Action")
- Allison Bell as Leary ("Honesty & Action")
- Amy Schumer as herself ("Tooth and Nail")

== Episodes ==
Season	Episodes	Originally released		
Season	Episodes	First released	Last released	Network
1	8	November 12, 2017	December 31, 2017	CBS All Access
2	8	November 22, 2018		CBS All Access
3	8	November 21, 2019		CBS All Access
4	8	April 8, 2021	May 27, 2021	Paramount+

=== Season 1 (2017) ===
No. overall	No. in season	Title	Directed by	Written by	Original release date
1	1	"Night 35"	Trent O'Donnell	Patrick Brammall & Trent O'Donnell	November 12, 2017
2	2	"Deep Sea Fishing"	Trent O'Donnell	Trent O'Donnell	November 19, 2017
3	3	"Dig a Hole"	Trent O'Donnell	Patrick Brammall	November 26, 2017
4	4	"The Metric System"	Trent O'Donnell	Trent O'Donnell	December 3, 2017
5	5	"Golden Age of Tunnels"	Trent O'Donnell	Seth Cohen & Amy Pocha	December 10, 2017
6	6	"The Crow"	Trent O'Donnell	Adam Zwar	December 17, 2017
7	7	"Team Coyote"	Trent O'Donnell	Matteo Borghese & Rob Turbovsky	December 24, 2017
8	8	"The Raid"	Trent O'Donnell	Patrick Brammall & Trent O'Donnell	December 31, 2017

=== Season 2 (2018) ===
No. overall	No. in season	Title	Directed by	Written by	Original release date
9	1	"Big Boy Has the Flu"	Trent O'Donnell	Patrick Brammall & Trent O'Donnell	November 22, 2018
10	2	"The Actress"	Trent O'Donnell	Trent O'Donnell	November 22, 2018
11	3	"Honesty & Action"	Trent O'Donnell	Nina Pedrad	November 22, 2018
12	4	"The Duck Egg"	Trent O'Donnell	Patrick Brammall	November 22, 2018
13	5	"Good Cop, Tolbeck Cop"	Trent O'Donnell	Steve Toltz	November 22, 2018
14	6	"Mr. X"	Trent O'Donnell	Ali Schouten	November 22, 2018
15	7	"By the Siege Side"	Trent O'Donnell	Nina Pedrad & Allison Lyman	November 22, 2018
16	8	"Operation Meat Puppet"	Trent O'Donnell	Steve Toltz	November 22, 2018

=== Season 3 (2019) ===
No. overall	No. in season	Title	Directed by	Written by	Original release date
17	1	"Tooth and Nail"	Trent O'Donnell	Trent O'Donnell	November 21, 2019
18	2	"Flight JA761"	Trent O'Donnell	Patrick Brammall	November 21, 2019
19	3	"There's No Ocean in Wichita"	Trent O'Donnell	Nina Pedrad	November 21, 2019
20	4	"Death Knock"	Trent O'Donnell	Steve Toltz	November 21, 2019
21	5	"Leon's Retirement Party"	Trent O'Donnell	Trent O'Donnell	November 21, 2019
22	6	"Kasprowicz vs. Haldeman"	Trent O'Donnell	Steve Toltz	November 21, 2019
23	7	"Googy"	Trent O'Donnell	Patrick Brammall	November 21, 2019
24	8	"Oops Sorry"	Trent O'Donnell	Nina Pedrad	November 21, 2019

=== Season 4 (2021) ===
No. overall	No. in season	Title	Directed by	Written by	Original release date
25	1	"It's Not a Cult!"	Trent O'Donnell	Trent O'Donnell	April 8, 2021
26	2	"Brother Eduardo"	Trent O'Donnell	Patrick Brammall & Trent O'Donnell	April 15, 2021
27	3	"Magnolia"	Trent O'Donnell	Patrick Brammall & Trent O'Donnell	April 22, 2021
28	4	"Tea for Two! Two for Tea"	Trent O'Donnell	Patrick Brammall, Trent O'Donnell & Nina Pedrad	April 29, 2021
29	5	"Not Another Waco!"	Trent O'Donnell	Patrick Brammall, Trent O'Donnell & Nina Pedrad	May 6, 2021
30	6	"Exit Counselor"	Trent O'Donnell	Patrick Brammall, Trent O'Donnell & Steve Toltz	May 13, 2021
31	7	"40 Days & 40 Nights"	Trent O'Donnell	Patrick Brammall & Trent O'Donnell	May 20, 2021
32	8	"Breaking Bread"	Trent O'Donnell	Steve Toltz	May 27, 2021

== Production ==
=== Development ===
On August 1, 2017, it was announced that CBS All Access had given the production, an American adaptation of the Australian television series No Activity, a series order. Executive producers were expected to include Will Ferrell, Adam McKay, Patrick Brammall, Trent O'Donnell, Jason Burrows and Joe Farrell. Production companies involved with the series were slated to consist of CBS Television Studios, Gary Sanchez Productions, and Funny Or Die. On October 4, 2017, it was announced that the series would premiere on November 12, 2017.

On February 13, 2018, it was announced that the series had been renewed for a second season. On September 25, 2018, it was announced that the second season would be released all at once on November 22, 2018.

On March 3, 2019, it was reported that the series had been renewed for a third season. On October 15, 2019, it was announced that the third season would premiere on November 21, 2019. On October 29, 2020, CBS All Access renewed the series for a fourth season, with the season being animated rather than live-action, during the set on COVID-19 pandemic.

=== Casting ===
Alongside the series premiere announcement, it was confirmed that the series would star Patrick Brammall and Tim Meadows with guest stars including Will Ferrell, Mark Berry, Arturo Castro, Mackenzie Davis, Bridget Everett, Darren Gilshenan, Travis Guba, Jake Johnson, Sunita Mani, Jason Mantzoukas, Adrian Martinez, Jesse Plemons, Fred Pohl, Alex Rodriguez, Amy Sedaris, J. K. Simmons, Courtenay Taylor, Michaela Watkins, and Daniel Zolghadri.

== Release ==
On October 4, 2017, a teaser trailer for the first season was released. On October 30, 2017, the official trailer for season one was released. On November 12, 2018, the official trailer and key art for season two were released.

Showcase (Canadian TV channel) picked up the show and broadcast season 1 in autumn 2020.

== Reception ==
The first season was met with a mixed reception from critics upon its premiere. On the review aggregation website Rotten Tomatoes, the first season holds a 70% approval rating, with an average rating of 5.58 out of 10 based on 10 reviews. The website's critical consensus reads, "No Activity feels refreshingly slapdash and agreeably aimless for a cop comedy, welcoming viewers to bask in its gentle mirth – though its hook may be less than satisfying for some viewers." Metacritic, which uses a weighted average, assigned the season a score of 56 out of 100 based on 5 reviews, indicating "mixed or average reviews".

In a positive review, The Guardian's Luke Buckmaster gave the series a rating of 3 out of 5 stars saying, "No Activity plays in minor key, a reminder of some of comedy's essential ingredients. Shticks combine irreverence with mundanity, there is generous give and take between performers, and it shows an appreciation of incongruity in various iterations."
