= Sacha Horler =

Australian actress

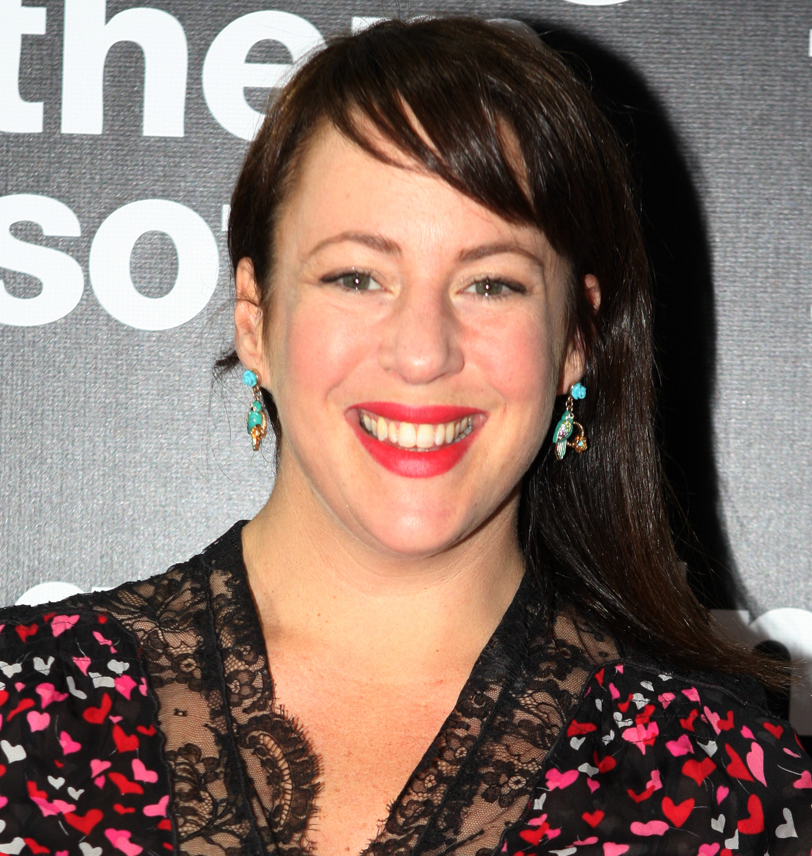
- Horler at the Killing Them Softly Australian Premiere in September 2012
- Born: Sydney, New South Wales, Australia
- Occupation: Actress
- Years active: 1995–present

Sacha Horler is an Australian actress. Her parents were lawyers, but co-founded Sydney's Nimrod Theatre Company in the early 1970s.

== Early life and education ==
Sacha Horler graduated from Sydney's National Institute of Dramatic Arts in 1993.

== Career ==
Horler made her film debut in 1995 with a role in the music-themed comedy Billy's Holiday.

Among her Sydney stage credits were featured roles in the one-act play collection Playgrounds (1996) and Harold Pinter's theatre classic The Birthday Party (1997). In 1997, Horler was featured in the Australian-produced drama Blackrock, and the following year she appeared in the international hit Babe: Pig in the City.

Horler's breakthrough role was in the 1998 gritty drama Praise, which featured a significant amount of nudity and sex scenes. In 1999, her follow-up supporting role in Soft Fruit required her to gain weight for the part. That same year she had a supporting role in the drama My Mother Frank.

Over the next ten years, Horler appeared in various roles in a number of Australian TV series. The more significant of these were the Australian Broadcasting Corporation comedy TV series Grass Roots in 2000 and 2003, the miniseries Changi in 2001, TV series drama CrashBurn and science fiction drama Farscape in 2003, and drama series headLand and the critically acclaimed Love My Way in 2006.

In 2009, Horler starred in the AFI-nominated Australian drama My Year Without Sex. Since then she has had recurring roles in a number of Australian drama series including Offspring in 2010, Small Time Gangster, legal drama Crownies in 2011, and the telemovie Beaconsfield in 2012.

== Awards ==
Horler won two Australian Film Institute acting awards in 1999, winning Best Actress as a sexual obsessive in Praise, and Best Supporting Actress for her role in Soft Fruit. Horler also won Best Supporting Actress in 2003 for her role in Travelling Light.

== Filmography ==
=== Film ===
Year	Title	Role	Notes
2018	The Hold Up	Clarice	Short film
2018	Nekrotronic	Mrs North	Feature film
2018	The Mother Situation	Sarah	Short film
2018	Peter Rabbit	Taxi Driver	Feature film
2017	Remembering Agatha	Cynthia	Short film
2017	A Few Less Men	Ranger Ruth	Feature film
2017	The Suitor	Aunt June	Short film
2016	Comedy Showroom: The Letdown	Ester	TV movie
2016	Kill Your Dinner	Scarlett	Short film
2015	The Dressmaker	Una Pleasence	Feature film
2012	Beaconsfield	Rachel Webb	TV movie
2010	Legend of the Guardians: The Owls of Ga'Hoole	Strix (voice)	Animated feature film
2010	Hawke	Jean Sinclair	TV movie
2010	Savages Crossing	Shae	Feature film
2009	My Year Without Sex	Natalie	Feature film
2005	BlackJack: Ace Point Game	Angie	TV movie
2005	Look Both Ways	Linda	Feature film
2005	The Illustrated Family Doctor	Carol Kelp	Feature film
2004	Go Big	Michaela Twinch	TV movie
2003	Syntax Error	Lauren	Short film
2003	Travelling Light	Bronwyn White	Feature film
2002	Secret Bridesmaids' Business	Lucy Dean	Feature film
2001	Russian Doll	Liza	Feature film
2000	Walk the Talk	Bonita	Feature film
2000	My Mother Frank	Margaret	Feature film
1999	Soft Fruit	Nadia	Feature film
1998	Babe: Pig in the City	Night Nurse	Feature film
1998	Praise	Cynthia	Feature film
1997	Blackrock	Teacher	Feature film
1995	Billy's Holiday	Kristin	Feature film

=== Television ===
Year	Title	Role	Notes	Ref
2027	The Great White	TBA	TV series	
2026	Return to Paradise	Dr. Ellen Novak	1 Episode (1.6 Vote 1 Murder)	
2024	Ladies in Black	Dorothy Miles	6 episodes	
2023	While the Men are Away	Helen	TV series, 3 episodes	
2022	Colin From Accounts	Fiona	TV series, 1 episode	
2021	Celebrity Letters and Numbers	Herself: Contestant	1 episode	
2019	Total Control	Kelly Campbell	TV series, 2 episodes	
2017-19	The Letdown	Ester	TV series, 10 episodes	
2016-19	Secret City	Ludie Sypek	TV series, 10 episodes	
2018	Sando	Victoria 'Sando' Sandringham	TV series, 6 episodes	
2016-17	Home and Away	Ranae Turner	TV series, 10 episodes	
2015-16	No Activity	Police Voice	TV series, 9 episodes	
2010-16	Offspring	Stacey	TV series, 4 episodes	
2016	The Kettering Incident	Barbara Holloway	TV series, 8 episodes	
2016	Jack Irish	Alli Aquaro	TV series, 4 episodes	
2015	Catching Milat	Karen Milat	TV miniseries, 1 episode	
2014	Black Comedy	Guest Cast	TV series, 2 episodes	
2014	Old School	Rhonda	TV series, 7 episodes	
2014	The Moodys	Yvonne Tisdale	TV series, 6 episodes	
2013	The Darkside			
2012	Dance Academy	Anthea	TV series, 3 episodes	
2011	Crownies	Virginia Gardiner	TV series, 5 episodes	
2011	Small Time Gangster	Cathy	TV series, 8 episodes	
2010	Rake	Annie Murray	TV series, 1 episode	
2009	My Place	Elsie	TV series, 1 episode	
2009	Rescue: Special Ops	Amanda Jackson	TV series, 1 episode	
2009	All Saints	Collette Harris	TV series. 1 episode	
2006	Love My Way	P.K	TV series, 8 episodes	
2006	headLand	Julie Palermo	TV series, 6 episodes	
2003	CrashBurn	Abby	TV series, 13 episodes	
2000-03	Grass Roots	Helen Manoufis	TV series, 15 episodes	
2003	Farscape	Prisoner Morrock	TV series, 1 episode	
2002	Halifax f.p.	Karen Oldfield	TV series, 1 episode	
2001	Changi	Nerida	TV miniseries, 1 episode	
1998	Murder Call	Elsepth	TV series, 1 episode	
1996	Water Rats	Christine Martin	TV series, 1 episode	
