= Lisa McCune =

Australian actress (born 1971)

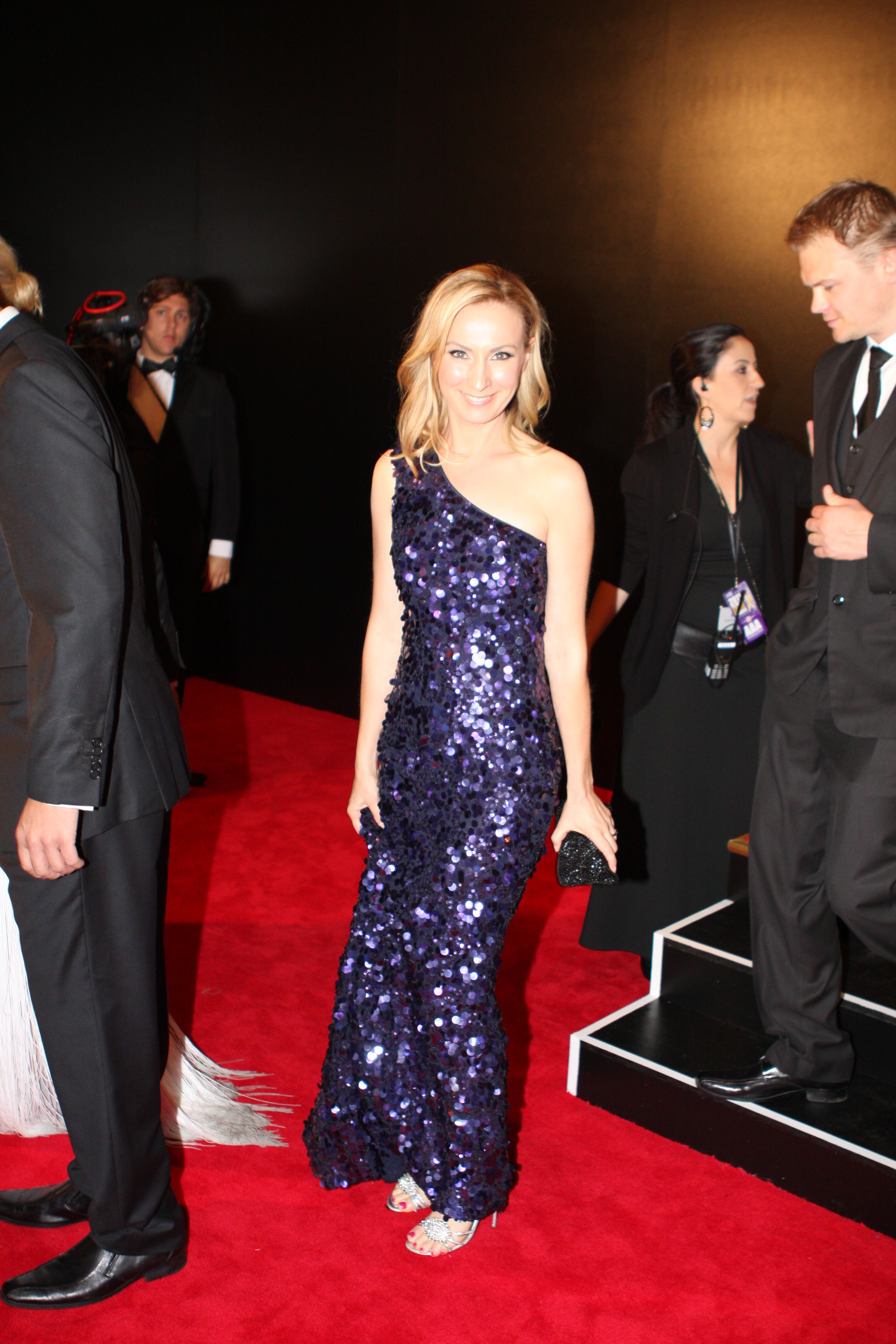
- McCune at the 2011 Logie Awards
- Born: 19 February 1971 (age 55); Sydney, New South Wales, Australia
- Education: Western Australian Academy of Performing Arts (BA)
- Occupation: Actress
- Years active: 1986−present
- Known for: Blue Heelers as Maggie Doyle
- Spouse: Tim Disney (m. 2000, divorced)
- Children: 3

Lisa McCune (born 19 February 1971) is an Australian actress, known for her role in TV series Blue Heelers as Senior Constable Maggie Doyle, and in Sea Patrol as Lieutenant Kate McGregor RAN. She has won four Gold Logie Awards.

McCune has also featured in many theatre roles.

== Early life ==
Born in Sydney, McCune grew up in Perth. She first performed on stage at the age of 15 playing Dorothy in The Wizard of Oz at the Limelight Theatre in Wanneroo, Western Australia.

After attending Carine Senior High School and graduating from Greenwood Senior High School, she was accepted into both the classical singing and musical theatre courses at the Western Australian Academy of Performing Arts (WAAPA). She graduated with a BA in Music Theatre in 1990.

== Career ==
=== Early career (1986–1993) ===
Upon graduation, McCune secured an agent, Robyn Gardiner Management (RGM Associates), and took on various jobs in Sydney and Melbourne. In February 1991, she won a twelve-month contract with Coles Supermarkets for a series of print and TV advertisements in which she played Lisa, the girl-next-door checkout chick.

McCune performed in a statewide tour of Victorian high schools in the educational John Romeril play about work experience, called Working Out, was in the chorus for a Sydney musical version of Great Expectations starring Philip Gould, and starred as the aspiring ballerina postulant, Sister Mary Leo, in the sequel to the Dan Goggin musical Nunsense.

She had a brief appearance in a re-enactment about a possible UFO-sighting in Bass Strait for the American series Unsolved Mysteries and a role in the 1993 satirical horror movie Body Melt in which her heavily pregnant character was attacked by a ferocious placenta before dying from an exploding stomach. McCune also sang in a couple of bands, including George Kapiniaris' Flares and Choice.

In 1991, she filmed a pilot for a Steve Vizard/Artist Services comedy called Turn it Up (aka Radio Waves). In 1993, McCune won the lead part of Allie Carter in the pilot of Newlyweds before being replaced by Annie Jones for the series.

=== Blue Heelers (1993–2000) ===
McCune shot to fame in September 1993 at age 22 when she debuted as Constable Maggie Doyle in Blue Heelers, playing the role until the seventh season. During this time she won the Gold Logie Award for Most Popular Television Personality four times.

Throughout her Blue Heelers run, she occasionally took time off to appear in other productions. In 1996 McCune appeared opposite Brett Climo who played her brother in Blue Heelers, in a friend's film The Inner Sanctuary. In early 1997 she played the role of Anne in the Melbourne Theatre Company's (MTC) production of Sondheim's A Little Night Music. In 1998, McCune played Cinderella in another Sondheim musical, Into the Woods. She also did two short seasons of the classic two-hander Love Letters.

In early 1999 she took six weeks off Blue Heelers to play one of the leads, Mary Abacus, in the miniseries adaptation of Bryce Courtenay's The Potato Factory, which earned her a nomination for an AFI award for Best Actress in a TV Drama. In July 1999, a couple of months before finishing on Blue Heelers, she starred alongside John Wood in She Loves Me.

=== Later career (2000–present) ===
Immediately after finishing Blue Heelers, she starred alongside John Waters, Bert Newton, Nikki Webster, Rachel Marley and later Rob Guest in a stage version of The Sound of Music, as Maria von Trapp.

In 2001, while she was pregnant with her first child, her portrait by Shaun Clark was entered in the Archibald Prize. She was off screens for a year to be a stay-at-home mother.

In 2002, her next project was a 'comeback' role in the television series Marshall Law with Alison Whyte and former Blue Heelers cast member William McInnes. Although it rated well in the first week, the series was critically panned and its subsequent low ratings ensured it was cancelled after one season.

In 2004, after another year off due to the birth to her second child, McCune slowly began to return to television. She again was the advertising face of Coles Supermarkets. She also hosted Seven Network shows The World Around Us and Forensic Investigators. McCune also appeared as the love interest opposite Matt Day in the ABC telemovie Hell Has Harbour Views.

In September 2005, McCune guest starred in a four-episode storyline on MDA alongside her former Blue Heelers co-star Paul Bishop. Also in 2005 she narrated a second season of Forensic Investigators and appeared in the Australian film Little Fish, starring alongside Cate Blanchett and Sam Neill in the early stages of her third pregnancy. In 2006, she played Annabel in Tripping Over.

She has also appeared in a number of musicals and other stage productions around Australia, notably as Sally Bowles in Cabaret, Hope Cladwell in Urinetown, and Olive Ostrovsky in The 25th Annual Putnam County Spelling Bee. In 2012/13, she performed opposite Teddy Tahu Rhodes in Opera Australia's production of the Bartlett Sher 2008 New York revival of the Rodgers and Hammerstein musical South Pacific at the Sydney Opera House, the Princess Theatre, Melbourne, and the Brisbane Queensland Performing Arts Centre.

From 2007 until 2011, McCune was in the ensemble cast for the Nine Network drama series, Sea Patrol. Her character is the executive officer (second in command) Lieutenant Kate McGregor, of HMAS Hammersley, a fictional Royal Australian Navy patrol boat. There were five seasons of the show, and it was cancelled due to financial issues resulting from the scheduled loss of pertinent government tax credits.

On 5 April 2008, she began her role of Sarah Brown in the major stage production Guys and Dolls, playing for 20 weeks at the Princess Theatre in Melbourne before being revived for a Sydney season at the Capitol Theatre on 12 March 2009.

In 2010, she appeared as Jean in the MTC production of Sarah Ruhl's Dead Man's Cell Phone. McCune also appeared as the celebrity guest in the reasonably-priced ute/car in season 3, episode 1 of Top Gear Australia in August. She appeared alongside Richard Roxburgh in season 1, episode 2 of the television series Rake, which aired in November.

McCune starred Dr. Sam Stewart in Reef Doctors, an Australian television drama series that ran 9 June 2013 to 7 September 2013.

In 2014, she starred as Anna Leonowens in Opera Australia's production of the Rodgers and Hammerstein musical The King and I, playing opposite Teddy Tahu Rhodes in Brisbane and Sydney, and Lou Diamond Phillips in Melbourne.

In 2015, McCune recorded "The Unbearable Price of War", a duet with Lee Kernaghan for his album Spirit of the Anzacs. Later that year, she joined David Hobson, Teddy Tahu Rhodes, and Greta Bradman for a concert tour, From Broadway to La Scala, of the five Australian mainland state capitals.

In 2018, she appeared in the Network Ten comedy How to Stay Married with Peter Helliar. In 2019, McCune appeared in 33 Variations at the Comedy Theatre, Melbourne, opposite Ellen Burstyn. McCune played Gertrude in Bell Shakespeare's 2020 production of Hamlet at the Sydney Opera House, the Canberra Theatre Centre and the Arts Centre Melbourne. In 2022, she appeared as Elizabeth Laine in Girl from the North Country at the Sydney Festival, and then in Adelaide and Melbourne.

In 2024, McCune appeared in ABC kids show Planet Lulin.

In August 2024, McCune won the twenty-first season of Dancing with the Stars Australia with professional dance partner Ian Waite. The pair won following an in-studio audience vote against fellow finalists Samantha Jade and Ant Middleton. Their two final routines received scores of 40 and 39 out of a possible 40.

In 2025, McCune was one of 5 contestants on season 4 of Taskmaster Australia.

== Personal life ==
McCune married Tim Disney, a film technician who was part of the Blue Heelers crew, on 18 February 2000. They have three children, born in 2001, 2003 and 2005. McCune confirmed in 2020 that Disney was her ex-husband but they continue to co-habitate and co-parent. In 2021, McCune said she was "happily single", in an interview with The Australian Women's Weekly.

== Filmography ==
=== Television ===
Year	Title	Role	Notes	Ref
1992	Fast Forward	Various	Episode: "4:16"	
1994–2000	Blue Heelers	Maggie Doyle	Main cast	
2000	The Potato Factory	Mary Abacus	Television miniseries	
2002	Marshall Law	Ros Marshall	Main cast	
2005	MDA	Dr. Liz Gibson	4 episodes	
2006	Two Twisted	Fiona Wells	Episode: "Call Back"	
2006	Tripping Over	Annabel	Episode: "1.1, 1.3, 1.5, 1.6"	
2007–2011	Sea Patrol	Lieutenant 'XO' Kate McGregor, RAN	Main cast	
2010	Rake	Lucy Marx	Episode 1.2: "R vs. Marx"	
2013	Reef Doctors	Dr. Sam Stewart	Main cast, also co-producer	
2013–2014	It's a Date	Em	Episode: "1.1, 1.2"	
2015	The Divorce	Louise	Main cast	
2017	The Warriors	Deb Van Exel	Main cast	
2017	The Ex-PM	Lorelei Baggins	Episode: "Reckoning"	
2018–2020	How to Stay Married	Em Butler	Main cast	
2023	Big Miracles	Narrator	7 episodes	
2023	The Garden Hustle	Self	Co-host	
2024	Planet Lulin (F.A.N.G)	Esme	10 episodes	
2025	Taskmaster Australia	Contestant		
2026	Ground Up	TBA	TV series	

=== Film ===
Year	Title	Role	Notes	Ref
1991	Turn It Up	Lynette	TV film	
1993	Body Melt	Cheryl Rand	Feature film	
1996	The Inner Sanctuary	Felicity	Feature film	
2005	Hell Has Harbour Views	Caroline Ashton	TV film	
2005	Little Fish	Laura	Feature film	
2007	One of the Lucky Ones	Wendy the Narrator	TV film	
2011	Blood Brothers	Margaret Kennedy	TV film	
2014	The Little Death	Maureen	Feature film	

== Stage ==
Year	Title	Role	Venue / Co.
1991	Working Out		Fairfax Studio, Melbourne
	Great Expectations	Chorus	Sydney
1993	Nunsense 2	Sister Mary Leo	La Mama, Melbourne with Open City, Edgley International & Malcolm C. Cooke
1997; 1998	A Little Night Music	Anna Egerman	Playhouse, Melbourne, Princess Theatre, Melbourne, Theatre Royal, Sydney with MTC
1998	Into the Woods	Cinderella	Playhouse, Melbourne
	Love Letters	Melissa Gardner	
1999	She Loves Me	Amalia Balash	Melbourne Concert Hall with The Production Company
1999; 2000	The Sound of Music	Maria von Trapp	Lyric Theatre, Sydney, Princess Theatre, Melbourne, Lyric Theatre, Brisbane with The Gordon Frost Organisation
2002; 2003	Cabaret	Sally Bowles	State Theatre, Sydney, Her Majesty's Theatre, Melbourne, Lyric Theatre, Brisbane with IMG Productions
2004; 2006	Urinetown	Hope Cladwell	Lyric Theatre, Brisbane, Playhouse, Melbourne, Sydney Theatre with MTC & STC
2007	The 25th Annual Putnam County Spelling Bee	Olive Ostrovsky	Sydney Theatre with MTC & STC
2008; 2009	Guys and Dolls	Sarah Brown	Princess Theatre, Melbourne, Capitol Theatre, Sydney with Donmar Productions
2010	Dead Man's Cell Phone	Jean	Southbank Theatre, Melbourne with MTC
2012	8 - The Play		Her Majesty's Theatre, Melbourne, Sydney Town Hall
2012; 2013	South Pacific	Nellie Forbush	Sydney Opera House, Princess Theatre, Melbourne, Queensland Performing Arts Centre, Festival Theatre, Adelaide with Opera Australia & Lincoln Center Theatre
2013	Shane Warne: the Musical	Simone Warne	Her Majesty's Theatre, Adelaide for Adelaide Cabaret Festival
2014	The King and I	Anna Leonowens	Lyric Theatre, Brisbane, Princess Theatre, Melbourne, Sydney Opera House with Opera Australia
2014	The Schummans – Love and Life in Letters and Song	Clara Schumann	Sydney Opera House with Lyric Arts Inc
2015; 2017	From Broadway to La Scala	Singer – Soprano	Sydney Opera House with Sydney Lyric
2016	Machu Picchu	Gabby / Middle Toe	Wharf Theatre, Sydney, Dunstan Playhouse, Adelaide with STCSA & STC
2016	Follies in Concert	Sally	Melbourne Recital Centre with Storeyboard Entertainment
2017	Letters from the Heart		Loreto College Theatre, Ballarat
2018	Gloria	Gloria / Nan	Southbank Theatre, Melbourne with MTC
2018	Peer Gynt		Federation Concert Hall, Hobart with Tasmanian Symphony Orchestra
2019	33 Variations	Clare	Comedy Theatre, Melbourne
2020	Hamlet	Gertrude	Sydney Opera House, Canberra Theatre Centre, Arts Centre Melbourne with Bell Shakespeare
2022	Girl from the North Country	Elizabeth Laine	Lyric Theatre, Brisbane, Canberra Theatre, Opera House, Wellington, Civic Theatre, Auckland, Comedy Theatre, Melbourne, Her Majesty's Theatre, Adelaide, Theatre Royal, Sydney for Sydney Festival with GWB Entertainment
2024	Sweat	Tracey	Wharf Theatre with STC
2026	Steel Magnolias	M'Lynn	Australian Tour
2027	Stone Yard Devotional	Narrator	Malthouse Theatre

== Awards and nominations ==
Year	Award	Category	Work	Result	Ref.
1995	Logie Awards	Most Popular New Talent	Blue Heelers	Won	
1996	Logie Awards	Most Popular Actress	Blue Heelers	Won	
1996	Logie Awards	Most Popular Personality	Blue Heelers	Nominated	
1997	Logie Awards	Most Popular Actress	Blue Heelers	Won	
1997	Logie Awards	Most Popular Personality	Blue Heelers	Won	
1998	Logie Awards	Most Popular Actress	Blue Heelers	Won	
1998	Logie Awards	Most Popular Personality	Blue Heelers	Won	
1998	People's Choice Awards	Favourite TV Star	Blue Heelers	Won	
1998	People's Choice Awards	Favourite Actress in a Drama or Serial	Blue Heelers	Won	
1999	Logie Awards	Most Popular Actress	Blue Heelers	Won	
1999	Logie Awards	Most Popular Personality	Blue Heelers	Won	
1999	People's Choice Awards	Favourite TV Star	Blue Heelers	Nominated	
1999	People's Choice Awards	Favourite Actress in a Drama or Serial	Blue Heelers	Nominated	
1999	AFI Awards	Best Actress in a Leading Role in a Television Drama	The Potato Factory	Nominated	
2000	Logie Awards	Most Popular Actress	Blue Heelers	Won	
2000	Logie Awards	Most Popular Personality	Blue Heelers	Won	
2000	Green Room Awards	Female Actor in a Leading Role (Music Theatre)	The Sound of Music	Nominated	
2001	Logie Awards	Most Popular Personality	Blue Heelers and The Potato Factory	Nominated	
2001	Helpmann Awards	Best Female Actor in a Musical	The Sound of Music	Nominated	
2003	Helpmann Awards	Best Female Actor in a Musical	Cabaret	Nominated	
2003	Green Room Awards	Female Actor in a Leading Role (Music Theatre)	Cabaret	Won	
2004	Green Room Awards	Female Actor in a Leading Role (Music Theatre)	Urinetown	Nominated	
2005	Helpmann Awards	Best Female Actor in a Musical	Urinetown	Nominated	
2006	Logie Awards	Most Outstanding Actress	Hell Has Harbour Views	Nominated	
2008	Logie Awards	Most Popular Actress	Sea Patrol	Nominated	
2008	Logie Awards	Most Popular Personality	Sea Patrol	Nominated	
2008	Green Room Awards	Female Actor in a Leading Role (Music Theatre)	Guys and Dolls	Nominated	
2012	Green Room Awards	Female Actor in a Leading Role (Music Theatre)	South Pacific	Nominated	
2014	AACTA Awards	Best Performance in a Television Comedy	It's a Date	Nominated	
2014	Helpmann Awards	Best Female Actor in a Musical	The King and I	Nominated	
2014	Green Room Awards	Female Actor in a Leading Role (Music Theatre)	The King and I	Nominated	
