= Dave Eastgate =

Australian actor, stand-up comedian, writer and musician

Dave Eastgate (born 31 January 1979) is an Australian actor, stand-up comedian, writer and musician.

Eastgate has performed his stand-up comedy routines extensively around Australia and internationally in New Zealand, UK, USA and Singapore. He played sold-out shows at the Edinburgh Fringe Festival in 2011 and 2012. In 2017, Eastgate appeared in the Sydney Theatre Company's stage adaptation of Muriel's Wedding.

== Television ==
Year	Title
2013	The Elegant Gentleman's Guide to Knife Fighting
2013	Wednesday Night Fever
2014	The Moodys
2014 - 2016	Soul Mates
2015	Hiding
2015	Maximum Choppage
2015	Open Slather
2016	Doctor Doctor
2016 - 2017	Here Come the Habibs!
2017	Ronny Chieng: International Student
2017	Kiki and Kitty
2018	Street Smart
2021	Young Rock
2021	Preppers
2022	Darby and Joan
2024	Territory
