= Trent O'Donnell =

Australian director and screenwriter

Trent O'Donnell is an Australian director, producer and screenwriter.

== Career ==
O'Donnell is a television director and co-owner of the production company Jungle. He wrote and directed the award-winning comedy series Review with Myles Barlow – an Australian television satirical comedy series broadcast on the Australian Broadcasting Corporation (ABC) television station ABC1.

O'Donnell also directed the acclaimed The Chaser's War on Everything and the TV series Laid which all aired on ABC1.

In 2012 he wrote, produced and directed A Moody Christmas, a six-part drama series for the ABC TV.

In 2013 he was a writer and director for The Elegant Gentleman's Guide to Knife Fighting, a sketch comedy show for the ABC TV.

O'Donnell has also directed several short films, including Tiny Little Pieces, which was a finalist in the prestigious Tropfest Film Festival in 2002.

== Recognition ==
Review with Myles Barlow won several AFI Awards for Best Comedy.

O'Donnell and Phil Lloyd, both from Jungle Entertainment, were awarded the Fred Parsons Award for Outstanding Contribution to Australian Comedy at the AWGIE Awards 2022.

== Filmography ==
Year	Title	Director	Writer	Producer	Executive producer	Notes
2008–2010	Review with Myles Barlow	Yes	Yes	No	No	Guest starred in 2 episodes
2009	The Chaser's War on Everything	Yes	No	No	No	
2011	Laid	Yes	No	No	No	Creative consultant
2011	The Hamster Wheel	Yes	No	No	No	
2012	Woodley	Yes	No	No	No	
2012	Kitchen Cabinet	Yes	No	No	No	News magazine
2012	A Moody Christmas	Yes	Yes	No	No	Co-creator
2012	Problems	Yes	No	No	No	
2013	The Elegant Gentleman's Guide to Knife Fighting	Yes	Yes	Yes	No	Co-creator
2013–2018	New Girl	Yes	No	No	Yes	
2014	The Moodys	Yes	Yes	Yes	No	Co-creator
2015–2018	Brooklyn Nine-Nine	Yes	No	No	No	
2015	Grandfathered	Yes	No	No	No	
2016	Comedy Showroom	Yes	No	No	No	Episode: "The Letdown"
2016–2017	Here Come the Habibs	No	Yes	No	Yes	Additional writing
2016–2019	The Letdown	Yes	No	No	No	
2016	Grace and Frankie	Yes	No	No	No	
2016–2018	The Good Place	Yes	No	No	No	
2017–2021	No Activity	Yes	Yes	No	Yes	Creator
2018–2019	Squinters	Yes	Yes	No	Yes	Co-creator; Additional writing
2018–2019	Single Parents	Yes	No	No	No	
2019	A.P. Bio	Yes	No	No	No	
2019–2021	The Moodys	No	No	No	Yes	
2020–2021	Saved by the Bell	Yes	No	No	Yes	
2021	Ride the Eagle	Yes	Yes	Yes	No	Feature film
2021–present	Ghosts	Yes	No	No	Yes	
2021	Guilty Party	Yes	No	No	Yes	
2022	Hacks	Yes	No	No	No	Episode: "The One, The Only"
2025	Going Dutch	Yes	No	No	No	
2025	DMV	Yes	Yes	No	No	
2026	Eternally Yours	Yes	Yes	No	No	
