= Rachel Marley =

Australian singer and actress (born 1990)

Rachel Claire Marley
- Born: 26 April 1990; Sydney, Australia
- Genres: Musical theatre, pop, disco, R&B, jazz
- Occupations: Singer, actor
- Years active: 1999–2020
- Label: Independent

Rachel Claire Marley (born 26 April 1990) is an Australian singer and actress. Her first major role was as Marta von Trapp in the 1999 Australian revival of The Sound of Music. She won the leading role of Annie, in the local production of Annie, which premiered in December 2000. In June 2002, Marley won the Young Entertainer of the Year category at the 13th Annual Ricky May Heart Awards for her performances in both The Sound of Music and Annie. In February 2012 she starred as Martha in Spring Awakening in Singapore with the PangDemonium! production company.

== Biography ==
Rachel Claire Marley was born on 26 April 1990 and grew up in Sydney. Her parents are Grant and Kathy Marley. She graduated from St Vincent's College and in 2008 she moved to Singapore where she completed her tertiary studies at LASALLE College of the Arts in 2011.

Marley grew up in Sydney and was inspired to become a singer from a young age. Her first major role came in the 1999 Australian revival of The Sound of Music as Marta von Trapp. She was one of 500 applicants who auditioned to play one of the von Trapp children. From 1999 to 2000 Marley appeared alongside Lisa McCune, John Waters and Bert Newton. Marley contributed to the Australian cast recording, which was recorded live on 23 and 24 November 1999.

Marley won the leading role of Annie, in the Australian production of Annie, which premiered in December 2000. She told Jane Albert of The Australian that she was prepared to dye her blonde hair bright red for the role. Marley starred alongside Anthony Warlow. Marley performed the song, "Tomorrow" at Carols in the Domain in December 2000 after arriving by helicopter. In June 2002, for her performances in both The Sound of Music and Annie, Marley won the Young Entertainer of the Year category at the 13th Annual Ricky May Heart Awards.

She played the nine-year-old Guido in a Lasalle College production of Nine, and in 2010 she portrayed Olive Ostrovsky in The 25th Annual Putnam County Spelling Bee. A highlight of which was Marley's performance of "The I Love You Song". In November 2010, Marley played three roles in The Heidi Chronicles: Jill, Lisa and Denise. In 2010 she also appeared in Blood Wedding, Sweet Charity (as Rosie) and Siren. In February 2012 she starred as Martha Bessel in Spring Awakening in Singapore with the PangDemonium! production company. In 2013 Marley relocated to London to play The Girl in Gordon Hamlin's production of Blackbird.
