= Christmess =

Australian Christmas film

- Directed by: Heath Davis
- Screenplay by: Heath Davis
- Produced by: Rick Beecroft; Heath Davis; Daniel Fenech; Jai Kemp; Matthew McCracken; Cindy Pritchard
- Starring: Hannah Joy; Steve Le Marquand; Darren Gilshenan
- Cinematography: Chris Bland
- Edited by: Romain Mongin
- Music by: Matt Sladen
- Production companies: Albert Street Films; Brick Studios
- Distributed by: Bonsai Films
- Release dates: 29 October 2023 (Austin Film Festival); 30 November 2023 (Australia)
- Running time: 99 minutes
- Country: Australia
- Language: English

Christmess is a 2023 Australian Christmas film written and directed by Heath Davis. It stars Hannah Joy, Steve Le Marquand, and Darren Gilshenan.

== Premise ==
Three recovering addicts try to get through the festive season without relapsing, in Campbelltown, a suburb in western Sydney, Australia.

== Cast ==
- Hannah Joy as Joy
- Steve Le Marquand as Chris Flint
- Darren Gilshenan as Nick
- Aaron Glenane as Jeff
- Nicole Pastor as Noelle
- George Burgess as a Doorman/bouncer

== Production ==
An independent Australian film, Christmess is written and directed by Heath Davis. Davis began writing an “authentic” Christmas film after Christmas 2020 when he spent time in isolation during the COVID-19 pandemic without work or family, and watched a lot of “bad Christmas films”.

It is produced by Daniel Fenech, Cindy Pritchard, and Matthew McCracken. Funding for the film partially came from crowd-funding.

=== Casting ===
The film marks the feature film acting debut of Hannah Joy, the lead singer with rock band Middle Kids. Joy wrote several original songs for Christmess, including Empty Chair, Deadbeat Dads, and Boxing Day and performs all three songs in character during the film.

=== Filming ===
Principal photography got underway in Sydney in June 2022 with a three-week filming schedule.

== Release ==
The film had its world premiere at the Austin Film Festival on 29 October 2023. It was released in Australia on 30 November 2023.

== Reception ==
Nadine Whitney in The Curb described the film as "painful, hopeful, gentle, and funny as hell".

Luke Buckmaster in The Guardian described it as "a very absorbing film, tenderly written and directed".

== See also ==
- List of Christmas films
