= Sando (TV series) =

- Genre: Comedy
- Created by: Phil Lloyd; Charlie Garber
- Written by: Phil Lloyd
- Directed by: Erin White; Christiaan Van Vuuren; Connor Van Vuuren
- Starring: Sacha Horler; Phil Lloyd; Krew Boylan; Adele Vuko; Dylan Hesp; Uli Latukefu; Firass Dirani; Rob Carlton
- Country of origin: Australia
- Original language: English
- No. of seasons: 1
- No. of episodes: 6

Production
- Producer: Chloe Rickard
- Production locations: Sydney, New South Wales
- Running time: 30 minutes
- Production company: Jungle Entertainment

Original release
- Network: ABC
- Release: 21 March – 25 April 2018

Sando is an Australian television comedy series which first began airing from 21 March 2018 on ABC.

== Plot ==
Australia's discount furniture queen, Victoria "Sando" Sandringham needs to reconnect with her family to revive her business and find personal redemption. The only problem is they mostly hate her. Mostly.

It centres on Sando who runs a large wholesale furniture business. Sadly, as successful as she once was in business (over 135 stores) she is careless and reckless in her personal life.

On her daughter Susie's wedding day, she got a text revealing that she was pregnant; the father was Kevin, Susie's bridegroom.

After ten years of separation, Sando finds her life in utter turmoil as her careless party-giving ways get the best of her.

On the brink of losing her business, she has no choice but to turn to her daughter Susie, now happily married to Gary and starting up an internet company that Sando wants to exploit.

Adding to the chaos are ex-husband Don, man-child son Eric, ten-year-old son Vic Jr. and baby-daddy Kevin, as well as Nicky, a "therapist" who is both Susie's best friend and in love with Don.

== Cast ==
- Sacha Horler as Sando
- Phil Lloyd as Don Sandringham
- Krew Boylan as Susie Sandringham
- Adele Vuko as Nicky Di Napoli
- Dylan Hesp as Eric Sandringham
- Uli Latukefu as Gary
- Firass Dirani as Kevin Keenan
- Rob Carlton as Tony
- Michael Denkha as Mikal

== Episodes ==
No. overall	No. in season	Title	Directed by	Written by	Original release date	Australian viewers (millions)
1	1	"Prodigal Mum"	Christiaan & Connor Van Vuuren	Phil Lloyd	21 March 2018	N/A
Sando reveals she slept with her daughter's fiance Kevin and is excommunicated from the family. 10 years on she must weasel her way back into the family in an attempt to win back her beloved company.
2	2	"Sorry"	Christiaan & Connor Van Vuuren	Tiffany Zehnal	28 March 2018	N/A
Sando goes about winning over Susie, whose best friend Nicky is having an affair with her father. Sando pulls out all the stops and just when Susie looks like coming around, Sando screws it all up, by being herself.
3	3	"New Mum"	Christiaan & Connor Van Vuuren	Charlie Garber	4 April 2018	N/A
Eric gets a job at Sando's Warehouse, but fails to live up to the family name, leaving Sando to clean up the mess. Sando rigs a family vote and Susie quits divorce proceedings in time to keep an important secret, secret.
4	4	"Therapy"	Erin White	Helen Dallimore	11 April 2018	N/A
Nicky hypnotises Sando, and surprisingly it works. But Kevin sabotages a family meal and the family concede they need the old Sando back.
5	5	"Lockdown"	Erin White	Gary Eck	18 April 2018	N/A
Nicky counsels Eric over a fear of girls and Don prepares for a gig. Rian thinks Susie's a Goblin (and so does Gary), while a mishap in the man cave threatens Don's gig and Sando's meeting with Tony.
6	6	"Family Business"	Erin White	Phil Lloyd & Charlie Garber	25 April 2018	N/A
Tony presents his vision for the future of Sando's Warehouse to the board while Sando pitches for her life. Now she must reunite the family to shoot a hit commercial... or lose both her company and family forever.
