= Patrick Brammall =

Australian actor and writer

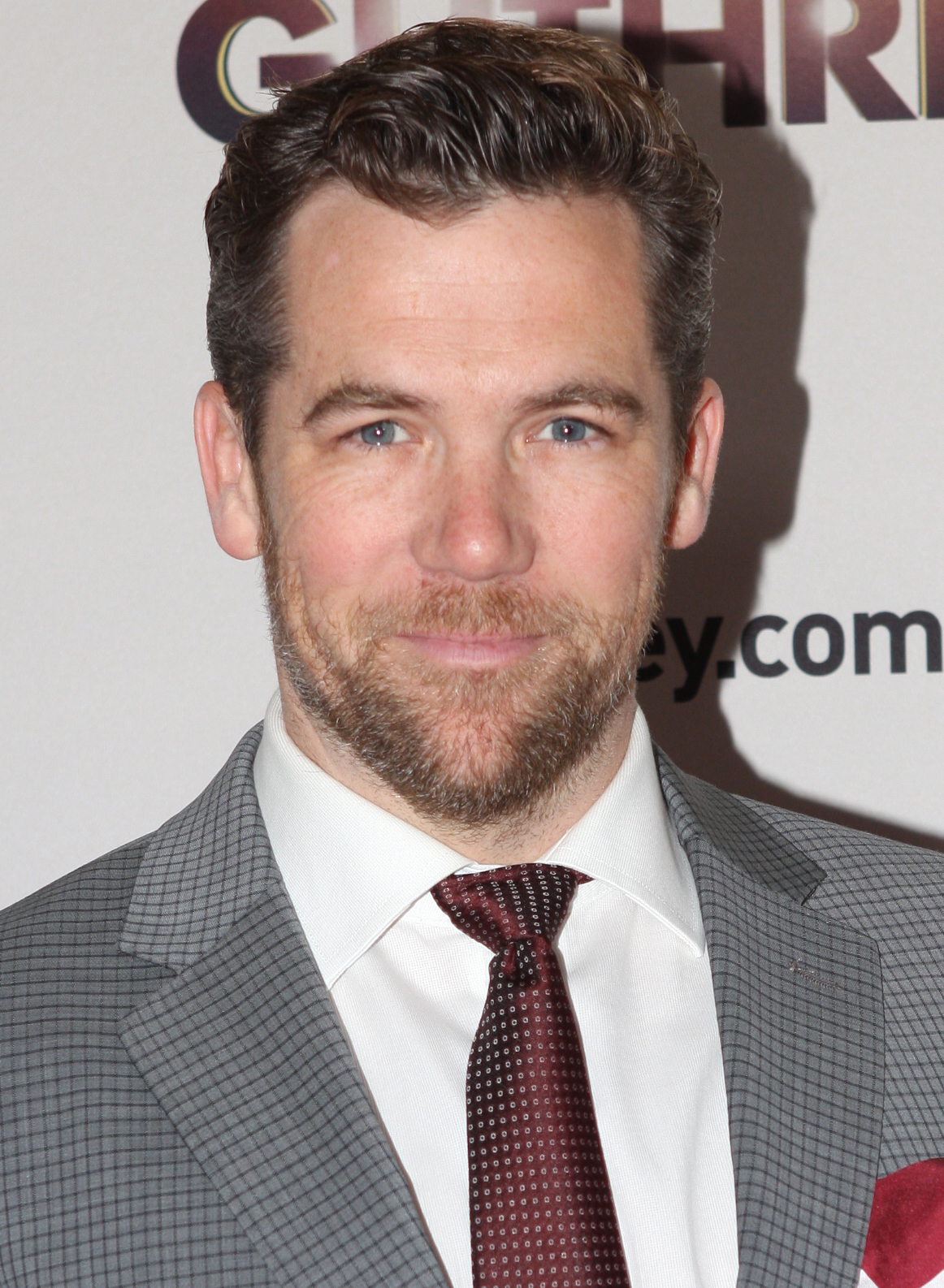
- Brammall at the premiere of Ruben Guthrie in 2015
- Born: 30 March 1976 (50 years); Canberra, Australian Capital Territory, Australia
- Education: Victorian College of the Arts
- Occupations: Actor; writer
- Years active: 2004–present
- Spouse(s): Samantha Nield (m. 2013, divorced) Harriet Dyer (m. 2021)
- Children: 2

Patrick Brammall is an Australian actor and writer. He is best known for his roles as Sean Moody in the ABC comedy series A Moody Christmas (2012) and its sequel, The Moodys (2014); as Leo Taylor in Channel Ten's Offspring (2014–2016); as Sergeant James Hayes in the ABC series Glitch (2015–2019), as Andy Bouchard in the Paramount+ series Evil (2019–2024), and as Ian Ridley in the Apple TV miniseries Last Seen (2026). Alongside his wife Harriet Dyer, he was the co-creator, co-writer, and co-star of the comedy series Colin from Accounts (2022–2026).

== Early life ==
Patrick Brammall was born in Canberra. As he was born with the rare genetic disorder prune belly syndrome, his doctors initially did not expect him to survive. He underwent several operations and spent quite a lot of time in and out of hospital during the first 10 years of his life. He attended St Thomas the Apostle Catholic Primary School in Kambah and secondary at Marist College Canberra.

== Career ==
Brammall graduated from the Victorian College of the Arts in 2001. His breakthrough role was in the 2004 television film The Alice, which led to a starring role in the spin-off series in 2005. He also had a starring role in the television series Canal Road in 2008. This was followed by many roles in television series, short films and theatre.

In 2010 he played Griff's brother Tim in the comedy-drama film Griff the Invisible.

In 2012 Brammall had a starring role in two ABC comedy series – The Strange Calls as Sgt. Neil Lloyd, and A Moody Christmas as Sean Moody (for which he won the AACTA Award for Best Performance in a Television Comedy). In 2013, Brammall reprised the role of Sean Moody for the eight-part series, The Moodys. He also wrote episode 5 of the series, and was consequently nominated for an Australian Writers' Guild award for Best Narrative Comedy.

Also in 2013 he acted in The Elegant Gentleman's Guide to Knife Fighting, a sketch comedy show for the ABC, before going on to play Rupert Murdoch in the Nine Network miniseries, Power Games: The Packer-Murdoch War, which went to air in September 2013.

Brammall also had a starring role in the ABC comedy series Upper Middle Bogan as Danny Bright, which premiered in August 2013. The second season premiered in October 2014.

In 2014 Brammall joined the main cast of the Network Ten series Offspring, playing the role of midwife Leo Taylor. He also has a co-starring role in the Josh Lawson written and directed comedy feature, The Little Death.

In 2015 he starred in both the film Ruben Guthrie and the Stan series No Activity.

In 2020 Brammall voiced Radley Heeler, Bandit and Stripe's brother, on the television series Bluey.

In 2022 Brammall starred, wrote and produced Binge/Foxtel comedy Colin from Accounts, In 2024, it was announced that a second season would go ahead. In April 2025, the series would be renewed for a third season.

In July 2024 Brammall was announced as the lead role for the Apple TV+ series Last Seen.

In 2025 Brammall was nominated for a silver Logie award for his work on Colin from Accounts.

Brammall appeared in The Devil Wears Prada 2 as a love interest of Anne Hathaway's character Andrea Sachs. The film was released in May 2026.

== Personal life ==
Brammall met his first wife Samantha Nield on the set of TV series The Alice, where she was a member of the crew. The couple married in 2013, but were divorced as of September 2017.

In August 2017 Brammall was reported to be dating actress Harriet Dyer. In March 2021, Brammall and Dyer married five days after they became engaged. Brammall is infertile owing to a childhood illness, an experience which has influenced his writing on Colin from Accounts. The couple adopted their first child, a daughter, in September 2021. They adopted a second daughter in February 2025.

== Filmography ==
=== Film ===
Year	Title	Role	Notes
2010	Griff the Invisible	Tim	
2014	The Little Death	Richard	
2015	Super Awesome!	Fairfax Ward	
2015	Ruben Guthrie	Ruben Guthrie	
2017	Fun Mom Dinner	Kevin	
2018	Overlord	American Officer	
2026	The Devil Wears Prada 2	Peter	

=== Television ===
Year	Title	Role	Notes
2004	The Alice	Matt Marione	TV film
2005–2006	The Alice	Matt Marione	Main role
2007	Home and Away	Ethan Black	Recurring role
2008	All Saints	Theo Wellburn	Episode: "The Hand You're Dealt"
2008	Canal Road	Steve Yunnane	Main role
2009	Rush	Milos Fink	Episode #2.10
2009	East West 101	Matt Johnson	Episode: "Another Life"
2009	I Can't Believe It's Not Better	Frank Forsythe	TV film
2010	Hawke	Kim Beazley	TV film
2010	The Librarians	Stuart	Episode: "Tsukiji"
2011	At Home With Julia	Bernard	Episode: "Citizens' Assembly"
2011	Some Say Love	Various	Episode: "Pilot"
2012	Lowdown	Clive McGann	Episode: "Ben Behaving Badly"
2012	The Strange Calls	Sgt. Neil Lloyd	Main role
2012	A Moody Christmas	Sean Moody	Main role AACTA Award for Best Performance in a Television Comedy
2012	Stuffed	Michael	TV short
2013	The Elegant Gentleman's Guide to Knife Fighting	Various	Main cast
2013	Power Games: The Packer–Murdoch Story	Rupert Murdoch	TV miniseries
2013–2016	Upper Middle Bogan	Danny Bright	Main role
2014	The Moodys	Sean Moody	Main role
2014–2016	Offspring	Leo Taylor	Main role
2015	Strange Calls	Sgt. Lloyd	TV film
2015–2018	No Activity	Hendy	Main role AACTA Award for Best Performance in a Television Comedy
2015–2019	Glitch	James Hayes	Main role
2016	Life in Pieces	Clinton	Episode: "Party Lobster Gym Sale"
2016	New Girl	Dusty Sand	Episode: "Road Trip"
2016	Comedy Showroom: The Letdown	Drug Dealer	TV short
2016	Furst Born	Danny	TV film
2017–2019	The Letdown	Scott	5 episodes
2017-2021	No Activity	Detective Nick Cullen	Main role U.S. adaptation of Australian show he also starred in
2019–2024	Evil	Andy Bouchard	Recurring role
2020	Call Your Mother	Danny	Main role
2020–present	Bluey	Uncle Radley (voice)	3 episodes
2022	Summer Love	Tom	Episode: "Jules and Tom & Jonah and Steph"; also writer
2022	The Strange Chores	Michael (voice)	Episode: "Have Dinner with a Vampire"
2022–2026	Colin from Accounts	Gordon	Main role; 24 episodes
2026	Last Seen	Ian Ridley	Main role; 6 episodes

=== Production / writing ===
Year	Title	Role	Notes
2013	The Elegant Gentleman's Guide to Knife Fighting	Writer	1 episode
2014	The Moody's	Writer	1 episode
2017–2021	No Activity	Writer / executive producer	31 episodes
2018	No Activity	Executive producer	1 episode
2022	Summer Love	Writer	1 episode
2022–present	Colin from Accounts	Writer / creator / executive producer	Seasons 1–2
