= The Elegant Gentleman's Guide to Knife Fighting =

Australian comedy television series

- Genre: Comedy
- Created by: Trent O'Donnell; Phil Lloyd; Jason Burrows
- Directed by: Jungleboys: Trent O'Donnell; Abe Forsythe; Craig Melville; Al Morrow; Wayne Blair; Scott Pickett; Leigh Richards; Alethea Jones; Christiaan Van Vuuren; Connor Van Vuuren
- Starring: Craig Anderson; Damon Herriman; Darren Gilshenan; David Eastgate; Georgina Haig; Janis McGavin; Patrick Brammall; Phil Lloyd; Robin McLeavy
- Country of origin: Australia
- Original language: English
- No. of seasons: 1
- No. of episodes: 6

Production
- Producers: Chloe Rickard; Nicola Woolfrey
- Running time: 28 minutes
- Production company: Jungleboys

Original release
- Network: ABC1
- Release: 3 April – 8 May 2013

The Elegant Gentleman's Guide to Knife Fighting is a six-part sketch comedy series produced by Australian production house Jungleboys. It first aired in Australia on ABC TV on 3 April 2013.

== Cast ==
- Craig Anderson
- Damon Herriman
- Darren Gilshenan
- David Eastgate
- Georgina Haig
- Janis McGavin
- Patrick Brammall
- Phil Lloyd
- Robin McLeavy
- Diana Glenn
- Alyssa McClelland

== See also ==
- List of Australian television series
