= It's a Date (TV series) =

2013 Australian comedy television series

- Genre: Comedy
- Created by: Peter Helliar
- Written by: Phil Lloyd; Jess Harris; Ryan Shelton; Justin Hamilton; Tony Moclair; Lawrence Mooney; Steven Gates; Kate Langbroek
- Directed by: Jonathan Brough; Peter Helliar
- Starring: Asher Keddie Kate Ritchie; John Wood; Lisa McCune; Stephen Curry; Shane Jacobson; Peter Helliar; Poh Ling Yeow; Denise Scott; Ross Noble Lawrence Mooney
- Country of origin: Australia
- Original language: English
- No. of seasons: 2
- No. of episodes: 16

Production
- Executive producers: Debbie Lee; Brett Sleigh
- Producers: Laura Waters; Andrea Denholm
- Editor: Steven Robinson
- Running time: 23 minutes (excluding commercials)
- Production company: Princess Pictures

Original release
- Network: ABC1
- Release: 15 August 2013 – 4 December 2014

It's a Date is an Australian ensemble comedy series which began screening on ABC1 on 15 August 2013. The eight-part series was written by comedian Peter Helliar and directed by Helliar and Jonathan Brough. The first series was produced by Laura Waters. Each episode poses a question about dating—such as 'should you date a friend's ex?'—and follows two sets of people as they grapple with the question.

== Season 1 Cast ==
=== Episode 1 ===
- Peter Helliar as Greg
- Lisa McCune as Em
- Dave Lawson as Patrick
- Poh Ling Yeow as Jasmine

=== Episode 2 ===
- John Wood as Rex
- Denise Scott as Gwen
- Sibylla Budd as Imogen
- Luke McGregor as Kevin
- Ed Kavalee as Brent

=== Episode 3 ===
- Asher Keddie as Verity
- Stephen Curry as Jason
- Eva Lazzaro as Lucy
- Louis Corbett as Richard

=== Episode 4 ===
- Kate Ritchie as Zara
- Nadine Garner as Eve
- Kate McLennan as Jessica
- Nazeem Hussain as Ashraf

=== Episode 5 ===
- Shane Jacobson as Hugo
- Pia Miranda as Shrek
- Ronny Chieng as Winston
- Emily Taheny as Manda

=== Episode 6 ===
- Jess Harris as Virginia
- Sophie Lowe as Vicky
- Ryan Shelton as Ben
- Daniel Wyllie as Kane

=== Episode 7 ===
- Sophie Cusworth as Sam
- Ron Jacobson as Doug
- Jackie Kelleher as Josie
- Rebecca Jo Hanbury as Twattsie
- Lawrence Mooney as The Pig
- Sally-Anne Upton as Brenda

=== Episode 8 ===
- Ross Noble as John
- Peter Rowsthorn as Michael
- Ian Smith as Don
- Heidi Valkenburg as Alison

== Season 2 Cast ==
=== Episode 1 ===
- Roy Billing as Graham
- Rebecca Jo Hanbury as Twattsie
- Kat Stewart as Jen
- Matt Okine as George
- Celia Pacquola as Cynthia

=== Episode 2 ===
- Rove McManus as Declan
- Adrienne Pickering as Tess
- Shaun Micallef as Roland
- Veronica Milsom as Sue
- Dan Wyllie as Kane

=== Episode 3 ===
- Ronny Chieng as Winston
- Emily Taheny as Manda
- Justine Clarke as Amy
- Phil Lloyd as Brad
- Peter Helliar as Greg (Brad's brother)

=== Episode 4 ===
- Lachy Hulme as Rory
- Magda Szubanski as Mary-Angela
- Steen Raskopoulos as Juzzy
- Tegan Higginbotham as Abby

=== Episode 5 ===
- Susie Porter as Jocelyn
- Rhys Darby as Craig
- Tasma Walton as Paulina
- Sam Simmons as Ray

=== Episode 6 ===
- Jimeoin as Terry
- Deborah Mailman as Joanne
- Eddie Perfect as Jeremy
- Amber Clayton as Freja

=== Episode 7 ===
- Bridie Carter as Sharna
- Vince Colosimo as Harry
- Aaron Pedersen as Matt/Ajuna
- Roz Hammond as Lizzie

=== Episode 8 ===
- Tom Ballard as Mark
- Joel Creasey as Tom
- Malorie O'Neill as Natalie
- Toby Wallace as Nathan

== Episodes ==
=== Season 1 ===
No. overall	No. in season	Title	Directed by	Written by	Original release date
1	1	"When Should You Abandon A Date?"	Jonathan Brough	Peter Helliar and Phil Lloyd	15 August 2013
Greg (Peter Helliar) goes on a blind date with the feisty Em (Lisa McCune), which quickly escalates as the night progresses. Meanwhile, Patrick (Dave Lawson) arranges a meeting with his parents and the parents of his girlfriend Jasmine (Poh Ling Yeow).
2	2	"How Important Is Honesty on a First Date?"	Peter Helliar	Peter Helliar and Ryan Shelton	22 August 2013
Imogen (Sibylla Budd) is shocked when Kevin (Luke McGregor), the African American windsurfer she met on the internet, is actually a socially awkward redhead. Gwen (Denise Scott) decides that she and Rex (John Wood) should be 100% honest with each other.
3	3	"How Important Is A Sense of Humour on a Date?"	Jonathan Brough	Peter Helliar and Justin Hamilton	29 August 2013
Verity's (Asher Keddie) boss, Jason (Stephen Curry), springs a surprise that fails to impress. Student, Richard (Louis Corbett), hosts a dinner for two with his crush, Lucy (Eva Lazzaro). It could be the perfect night if only his family don't interfere.
4	4	"Do Opposites Attract?"	Jonathan Brough	Peter Helliar and Kate Langbroek	5 September 2013
A chance meeting at a bus stop allows country girl Jessica (Kate McLennan) to spend some time with Sri Lankan Muslim Ashraf (Nazeem Hussain). Meanwhile, happy-go-lucky Zara (Kate Ritchie) and strong minded Eve (Nadine Garner) struggle to find common ground.
5	5	"Should You Date on the Rebound?"	Jonathan Brough	Peter Helliar, Tony Moclair and Steve Gates	12 September 2013
Single father Hugo (Shane Jacobson) reluctantly agrees to a blind date with his sister's nanny Camilla (Pia Miranda). Shopping centre workers Winston (Ronny Chieng) & Manda (Emily Taheny) may or may not be ready to move on from their previous relationships.
6	6	"How Much Do First Impressions Count?"	Jonathan Brough	Peter Helliar and Jess Harris	19 September 2013
Wallflower Vicky (Sophie Lowe) finally lands a date with her work crush, the extremely confident Ben (Ryan Shelton). Health fanatic Virginia (Jess Harris) takes a chance with an extrovert and life of the party, Kane (Daniel Wyllie).
7	7	"Should You Have Sex on a First Date?"	Peter Helliar	Peter Helliar and Lawrence Mooney	26 September 2013
Radio jock, The Pig (Lawrence Mooney), gets a shock when he meets a young fan (Sophie Cusworth); and octogenarian Josie (Jackie Kelleher) offers fellow retirement home resident Doug (Ron Jacobson) an unexpected proposition.
8	8	"Does Age Matter?"	Jonathan Brough	Peter Helliar and Shaun Micallef	3 October 2013
Med student Alison (Heidi Valkenburg) tries to keep her expectations in check while on a date with fellow med student, Michael (Peter Rowsthorn). Will age spoil any chance of a relationship between Englishman John (Ross Noble) and widower Don (Ian Smith)?

=== Season 2 ===
No. overall	No. in season	Title	Directed by	Written by	Original release date
9	1	"Do Set Up Dates Work?"	Jonathan Brough	Peter Helliar and Celia Pacquola	16 October 2014
Jen (Kat Stewart) was set up with Greg's (Peter Helliar) brother, but ends up on a date with Greg's father, Graham (Roy Billing). Radio news presenter Cynthia (Celia Pacquola) is set up on a date for a radio stunt with George (Matt Okine).
10	2	"Is It OK To Date A Friend's Ex?"	Jonathan Brough	Peter Helliar and Lawrence Mooney	23 October 2014
Declan (Rove McManus) receives the go ahead from theatre performer Roland (Shaun Micallef) to date his ex-lover Tess (Adrienne Pickering). Sue (Veronica Milsom) tests her loyalty when a date to the cinema with Kane (Dan Wyllie) proves extremely revealing.
11	3	"What's the Worst Thing that Can Happen?"	Erin White	Peter Helliar and Phil Lloyd	30 October 2014
Physio Amy (Justine Clarke) breaks her rule about not dating clients with Brad (Phil Lloyd). Manda (Emily Taheny) takes Winston (Ronny Chieng) out of their comfort zone to go camping for their 1st anniversary.
12	4	"How Much Research Should You Do Before Dating?"	Erin White	Peter Helliar, Magda Szubanski, and Ryan Shelton	6 November 2014
Mary-Angela (Magda Szubanski) wants a big favour on a hen's night from stripper Rory (Lachy Hulme). Juzzy (Steen Raskopoulos) goes for a date with a Facebook friend, but ends up having drinks with childhood friend Abby (Tegan Higginbotham).
13	5	"Should You Date Outside Your Comfort Zone?"	Jonathan Brough	Peter Helliar and Ryan Shelton	13 November 2014
Jocelyn (Susie Porter) needs a date for a swingers party to impress her husband, and takes along colleague Craig (Rhys Darby) for the ride. Ray (Sam Simmons) gets a "residential visit" from Paulina (Tasma Walton), who has a secret.
14	6	"Should You Date on Impulse?"	Jonathan Brough	Peter Helliar, Luke McGregor and Eddie Perfect	20 November 2014
Joanne (Deborah Mailman) takes a chance on the man who saved her, Terry (Jimeoin). Freja (Amber Clayton) joins Jeremy (Eddie Perfect) on a search for his dog on her last night in Australia.
15	7	"Should You Re-connect with an Old Flame?"	Peter Helliar	Peter Helliar and Roz Hammond	27 November 2014
Sharna (Bridie Carter) decides to have a booty call with her musician ex Harry (Vince Colosimo), and encourages him to take a new direction. Lizzie (Roz Hammond) discovers that her disastrous ex Matt (Aaron Pedersen) has become guru Arjuna.
16	8	"Should You Take a Date to a Wedding?"	Peter Helliar	Peter Helliar and Steve Gates	4 December 2014
Siblings Mark (Tom Ballard) and Natalie (Malorie O'Neill) make a pact to take a date to their brother's wedding. For the recently out Mark, he chooses his grandfather's carer Tom (Joel Creasey) for their first date, while Natalie chooses "inspiring" uni rabble-rouser Nathan (Toby Wallace).

== Reception ==
Critical response was more positive than not. Rob Moran felt that It's a Date opted "for star power and broad gags" over quality, but Debi Enkar felt that the series was warm, and Kylie Northover wrote that "while some of the humour tends towards broad ockerism, there are some poignant moments and some acutely observed truisms."

== Spin-off ==
A spin-off series based on characters Greg (Peter Helliar) & Em (Lisa McCune) will on air Network Ten in 2018. This series see them been married for 13 years but have lost their spark, as they try to work things out things happening around them make it more complicated.

== See also ==
- List of Australian television series
- List of programs broadcast by ABC (Australian TV network)
