= A Moody Christmas =

Australian television series (2012)

- Genre: Comedy; Drama
- Created by: Trent O'Donnell; Phil Lloyd
- Written by: Trent O'Donnell; Phil Lloyd
- Directed by: Trent O'Donnell
- Starring: Ian Meadows; Patrick Brammall; Jane Harber; Danny Adcock; Tina Bursill; Rachel Gordon; Phil Lloyd; Robina Beard; Darren Gilshenan; Guy Edmonds
- Country of origin: Australia
- Original language: English
- No. of seasons: 2
- No. of episodes: 14

Production
- Executive producers: Jason Burrows; Debbie Lee
- Producers: Andy Walker; Phil Lloyd
- Production locations: Sydney, New South Wales, Australia
- Production company: Jungleboys

Original release
- Network: ABC1
- Release: 31 October – 5 December 2012

A Moody Christmas is an Australian television comedy series that follows the adventures of Dan Moody, who returns home from London to spend each Christmas with his dysfunctional family. It was created and written by Trent O'Donnell and Phil Lloyd at Jungleboys, and was directed by Trent O'Donnell. The series was produced by Andy Walker, co-produced by Phil Lloyd, and executive produced by Jason Burrows of Jungleboys and Debbie Lee of ABC Television. The six-part series was first screened on ABC1 in the lead up to Christmas in October, November, and December 2012. Shot largely in Sydney, Australia, each episode runs for half an hour, following the Moody family on Christmas Day over six years.

A second series, The Moodys, began airing on ABC on 5 February 2014. The eight-part series follows the Moody family through a year's worth of celebrations, including Australia Day, Easter, and Bridget's 40th birthday. The second series was aired in the United States on Hulu in Spring 2014.

An American version of A Moody Christmas was announced in August 2013 and the show had a put pilot commitment to air on FOX. On 21 October 2019, it was announced that the series, titled The Moodys, would premiere on 4 December 2019.

== Cast ==
- Ian Meadows as Dan Moody
- Patrick Brammall as Sean Moody
- Jane Harber as Cora Benson
- Danny Adcock as Kevin Moody
- Tina Bursill as Maree Moody
- Rachel Gordon as Bridget Quaill
- Phil Lloyd as Roger Quaill
- Robina Beard as Gwen Dawes
- Darren Gilshenan as Terry Moody
- Guy Edmonds as Hayden Roberts
- Lorna Lesley as Cora's Mum
- David Field as Uncle Rhys
- Bryan Marshall as Cora's Uncle
- Rob Carlton as Elliot

== Episodes ==
| Episode No. | Title | Directed by | Written by | Original Air Date |
|---|---|---|---|---|
| 1 | "Separate Seats" | Trent O'Donnell | Trent O'Donnell and Phil Lloyd | 31 October 2012 |
After his girlfriend dumps him at the airport, Dan returns home alone to Sydney for Christmas for the first time since he moved to London two years before. Jetlagged, depressed, and without an ally to endure his overbearing family with, Dan’s day goes from bad to worse. He’s falsely accused of racism, roped into helping his misguided brother Sean rescue a lawnmower, and sickened by some Russian delicacy made by Uncle Terry’s new wife. If he had not also met his arrogant cousin’s new girlfriend, Cora, the day might have been a total loss. Meanwhile, Kevin decides to put in a pool; Bridget and Roger announce that they're expecting; and, after much pestering from Maree about not doing the lawns in time, Sean decides that Christmas Day is the perfect time to steal his lawnmower back, with disastrous results.
| 2 | "Operation Sex Via The Homeless" | Trent O'Donnell | Trent O'Donnell and Phil Lloyd | 7 November 2012 |
Dan gets home Christmas Eve to find everyone heading to Carols by Candlelight to see Terry sing. The event is marred when Terry breaks down on stage over his split with Dashenka. Wanting to have a more meaningful Christmas, Maree drags Dan to a homeless shelter the next morning, where she and Cora are volunteering. After reconnecting with Cora following their kiss last year, Dan makes a faux pas with a homeless woman, Linda, whom he subsequently invites to lunch to make amends. Maree’s also invited her friend from work, Chris, hoping her family won’t argue in front of a stranger at lunch. Having set up an air-con business in direct competition with his father’s, Kevin delights in Sean being called out to fix one of the dodgy units he’s installed. Meanwhile Roger and Bridget try to capitalise on Bridget’s ovulation window following her miscarriage earlier that year. After Dan does Cora a favour by photographing her clothes for her application to a London fashion school, the day ends with the shock discovery that Linda has stolen all their gifts from under the tree. "So much for Christmas spirit," grumbles Kevin, unaware that they have made Christmas elsewhere for Linda and her pals an unforgettable one as they enjoy the spoils from the Moodys.
| 3 | "Decapod Crustaceans" | Trent O'Donnell | Trent O'Donnell and Phil Lloyd | 14 November 2012 |
Dan lands at the airport with Cora; they've been seeing each other since she broke up with Hayden, and they'll break the news at lunch since Hayden won't be there this year. It's one more secret mounting up: Dan learns that Bridget and Roger have split and Roger has 'come out' and is now with Maree's colleague Chris. Bridget swears Dan to secrecy, as she and Roger are pretending to be together to save face and achieve Bridget's adoption plans. Kevin tries to convince Sean to join the family business and Sean's mate Scott, also a Christmas-lunch guest, has a crush on Maree. Dan panics when Hayden suddenly arrives, but he's unable to reach Cora. Hayden and Terry seem haunted by a big night out after his breakup, and Dan lets slip about Bridget and Roger. Kevin finds Maree trying on lingerie that Scott gave her for Christmas and has a heart attack just as Cora arrives. At the hospital, Sean promises to come work for Kevin if he pulls through, and Cora and Dan decide that this isn't the best time to break their news.
| 4 | "I'm Walt Roskow" | Trent O'Donnell | Trent O'Donnell and Phil Lloyd | 21 November 2012 |
Dan is met by his dad at the airport. Kevin wants to walk home since he’s on a health kick; he uses the time to lament how Sean has driven the family business into the ground since joining the company. At home Dan meets Sean’s son Cooper, the result of Sean’s visit to Peggy’s house to fix her air-conditioning two Christmases ago. But Dan seems more preoccupied that it looks like Cora's back with Hayden. Bridget has found a new suitor, Elliot, a smooth-talking cad 20 years her senior whose deliberately coy innuendos to Kevin severely test his patience. Terry also has a new love interest: Irene, the Russian nurse who cared for Kevin in hospital after his heart attack. He’s almost as proud of her as he is of his new homebrew, rocket-fuel that gets Dan quite drunk and bolshie with Hayden and Cora, who are now in business together, with Hayden funding her fashion label. But when Hayden finds a photo of Dan and Cora kissing in London, all hell breaks loose, leaving Dan with a bloody nose and more than one relationship in doubt. The day ends with the family sitting back watching a tape of A Current Affair: the exposé that revealed Sean as a dodgy repairman.
| 5 | "Water Under The Bridge" | Trent O'Donnell | Trent O'Donnell and Phil Lloyd | 28 November 2012 |
Dan arrives Christmas morning with his confident, precocious new girlfriend Patience, a model he met through work. Hayden and Cora are back together and Hayden is saying that last year is "water under the bridge," but this is sorely tested when all four get stuck in a car on the way to visit Grandma. Meanwhile, Sean’s plan to propose to Peggy are waylaid by Uncle Rhys, who has come on his day-release from prison to make amends as part of his rehabilitation. When Roger arrives, Bridget is still planning to adopt a child with him, and they need to create the façade that they are still a couple and want to document such happy-family occasions for their application despite Maree’s doubt that this will work. Rhys gives the family a painting depicting some of his wrongs from the past. It proves to be quite explosive, driving Rhys to snap and stab his own leg with a fork. Back in the car, tensions among Cora, Dan and Hayden rise; then when they reach the nursing home, Grandma is missing! Patience performs karaoke for the residents while the other three embark on a search, during which Cora and Dan uneasily decide to just move on as friends. Dan eventually finds Grandma at the nearby bowling club. She confesses that sometimes she needs a year off from the Moodys, and Dan can hardly argue with that.
| 6 | "Last Minute Airfare" | Trent O'Donnell | Trent O'Donnell and Phil Lloyd | 5 December 2012 |
After declaring he won’t be home for Christmas this year, Dan mistakes a text from Cora as a confession that she still wants to be with him. He rushes back, only to have Sean work out his mix-up, leaving Dan feeling like an idiot. At home he does get to meet Max, Bridget's 8-year-old adopted son: he talks like an adult and Sean has some weird competitive rivalry with him. Uncle Terry is embarrassed when his date Oksana turns out to be an escort. Kevin is thrilled to finally (only six years later!) reveal the new swimming pool as his Christmas gift. Roger brings Chris to lunch, and Bridget discovers that despite attending multiple gay-marriage rallies through the year, Roger isn't sure he wants to get married. Sean’s new business,'Dying High Funeral Fireworks,’ causes a stir. Sean takes Dan to Peggy’s house to show him why he should go after Cora: because he’ll miss out like Sean has otherwise, since Peggy is back with her ex, Brian. Dan points out that Peggy used him and told him he was Cooper’s dad when he wasn’t. When Brian puts an axe through the car bonnet, Sean stays to take him on and spurs Dan away to Cora’s house. But in the throes of confessing his feelings, Dan discovers he’s too late: Hayden and Cora are engaged. Gutted, he goes home, where he angrily chops down the banner that has been a painful reminder of his romantic failings for 6 Christmases. After Dan and Sean perform a rousing guitar duet for the family, the day ends sadly with Grandma dying--and falling into the pool. At her funeral, Sean has packed her ashes into fireworks. Dan is at the airport once again...when an unexpected visitor arrives.

Additionally, two composition episodes, Episode 7 Composition: Parts 1-3 and Episode 8 Composition: Parts 4–6, were broadcast on ABC1 on 25 December 2012 and 26 December 2012 respectively. This was effectively an encore screening of the series, in two parts, across Christmas Day and Boxing Day 2012.

== Trivia ==
The Moody house was at 31 Reserve St Denistone. It has since been demolished, the land subdivided and two houses built on the site.

== See also ==
- List of Australian television series
- List of programs broadcast by ABC (Australian TV network)
- List of Christmas films
