= Woodley (TV series) =

Australian television series

Woodley is an Australian television comedy series that premiered on 22 February 2012 at 8:00 pm on the ABC TV. The eight-part comedy series is written by and stars comedian Frank Woodley.

== Overview ==
Woodley (Frank Woodley) is the chaotic and accident prone, yet devoted father of seven-year-old Ollie (Alexandra Cashmere). Recently divorced, his ex-wife Em (Justine Clarke) could not live with the chaos but Woodley secretly hopes that one day he will win her back and they will be a family again. But with Em's new boyfriend Greg (Tom Long) on the scene, it is not going to be easy. For Em, Greg is reliable and focused, everything that Woodley was not while they were married, and it does not take long for Greg to slip easily into the fabric of their lives. Woodley struggles to come to terms with Em's new relationship and endeavours to prove to Em that he is still worthy of her love. Ollie loves her dad and Woodley is determined to never let her down or lose the special spot in her heart that she holds just for him. But as Greg's affection for Em grows, and Em in turn sees a possible future with him, will Woodley be able to win Em back before it is too late?

== Cast ==
- Frank Woodley as Woodley
- Justine Clarke as Em
- Tom Long as Greg
- Alexandra Cashmere as Ollie
- Layla Lola as Sally
- Jack Charles as Vern
- Phil Lloyd as Doctor
- Reg Gorman as Priest
- Marty Fields as Eric

== Series overview ==
Series	Episodes	Originally aired		DVD release date		
Series	Episodes	Season premiere	Season finale	Region 1	Region 2	Region 4
1	8	22 February 2012	11 April 2012	—N/a	—N/a	3 May 2012

== Episodes ==
No.	Title	Directed by	Written by	Original release date	Viewers
1	"The Story So Far"	Trent O'Donnell	Frank Woodley	22 February 2012	543,000
Recently divorced, Woodley is still coming to terms with being a single dad. He misses the day to day family life he had with his daughter Ollie and his ex-wife Em.
2	"Fuzzby"	Trent O'Donnell	Frank Woodley	29 February 2012	400,000
Em has tickets to a fashion show, so Ollie's staying the night at her dad's. But when she realises that she has left Fuzzby, her much loved toy at home, she refuses to sleep without it.
3	"Greg"	Trent O'Donnell	Frank Woodley	7 March 2012	331,000
When Woodley's long suffering psychologist reveals that he plans to share Woodley's case with a new colleague Dr Fisher, Woodley is unconcerned. Back at Em's house, Woodley meets Em's new boyfriend Greg (played by Tom Long).
4	"Big Top Magnifique"	Trent O'Donnell	Frank Woodley	14 March 2012	346,000
During a trip to the circus, a fearful Woodley backs out of taking part in a juggling act involving machetes. Much to Em and Ollie's delight, Greg steps up to the challenge, leaving Woodley feeling a little deflated.
5	"Vern's Last Gig"	Trent O'Donnell	Frank Woodley	21 March 2012	N/A
Woodley is distraught when his grandfather Vern (played by Jack Charles), suffers a near fatal heart attack. While hospitalised, Woodley does his best to lift his grandfather's spirits, much to the annoyance of Vern's pessimistic Doctor (played by Phil Lloyd), who diagnoses that Vern only has a few months to live and should take it easy.
6	"The Funeral"	Trent O'Donnell	Frank Woodley	28 March 2012	394,000
An upset Woodley struggles to tell Ollie about Vern's death. With the support of Em, he pushes forward with the funeral arrangements, wanting everything to be just perfect.
7	"Dad's Day"	Trent O'Donnell	Frank Woodley	4 April 2012	340,000
It's Dad Day at Ollie's school, and Woodley is keen to make a good impression. Dressed as a policeman, he tries to convince her class that he is a fearless officer of the law.
8	"The Wedding"	Trent O'Donnell	Frank Woodley	11 April 2012	375,000
Woodley, Em and Ollie find themselves accidentally locked inside a display home for the night. When Woodley discovers a means of escape, he chooses to keep it to himself so he can continue to enjoy this illusion of a happy family. This plan is ultimately unsuccessful.

== See also ==
- The Adventures of Lano and Woodley
