= The Moodys =

- Genre: Sitcom
- Created by: Trent O'Donnell; Phil Lloyd
- Written by: Trent O'Donnell; Phil Lloyd
- Directed by: Trent O'Donnell (episodes 1, 3, 4, 5 and 8); Scott Pickett (episodes 2, 6 and 7)
- Starring: Ian Meadows; Patrick Brammall; Danny Adcock; Tina Bursill; Darren Gilshenan; Rachel Gordon; Jane Harber; Phil Lloyd; Sacha Horler; Jonny Pasvolsky
- Country of origin: Australia
- Original language: English
- No. of seasons: 1
- No. of episodes: 8

Production
- Production company: Jungle Entertainment

Original release
- Network: ABC
- Release: 5 February – 26 March 2014

The Moodys is an Australian television comedy series, which follows on from A Moody Christmas. The Moodys began airing on ABC on 5 February 2014 and aired in the United States on Hulu in Spring 2014.

Originally written and created by Trent O'Donnell and Phil Lloyd at Jungleboys, this series also involved some guest writers for an episode each: Patrick Brammall (Episode 5) and Ian Meadows (Episode 7).

== Plot ==
In this series, Dan Moody (Ian Meadows) has returned from London to live in Australia, with his now-girlfriend Cora Benson (Jane Harber). This series explores the highs and lows of their rocky relationship, develops several storylines from the other family members and introduces some new characters to the show. It is based over a year of family events rather than a succession of Christmas Days, as it did in the first series. Shot in Sydney, each episode is approximately 30 minutes.

== Crew ==
- Executive Producers: Jason Burrows (Jungleboys) and Andrew Gregory (ABC)
- Co Producers: Phil Lloyd and Trent O'Donnell
- Directors: Trent O'Donnell and Scott Pickett
- Series Producer: Chloe Rickard
- Co Producer/Post Production Producer: Nicola Woolfrey
- Editor: Paul Swain

== Cast ==
=== Main/recurring ===
- Ian Meadows as Dan Moody
- Patrick Brammall as Sean Moody
- Danny Adcock as Kevin Moody
- Tina Bursill as Maree Moody
- Darren Gilshenan as Terry Moody
- Rachel Gordon as Bridget Quail
- Jane Harber as Cora Benson
- Phil Lloyd as Roger Quail
- Sacha Horler as Yvonne Tisdale (6 episodes)
- Jonny Pasvolsky as Matt Capello (5 episodes)
- Dave Eastgate as Scotty (5 episodes)

=== Guests ===
- Anita Hegh as Hazel (2 episodes)
- Brian Rooney as Benji (1 episode)
- David Field as Rhys (1 episode)
- Denise Roberts as Celebrant (1 episode)
- Eliza Logan as Tracey (1 episode)
- Glenn Hazeldine as Colin Rosebloom (1 episode)
- Guy Edmonds as Hayden Roberts (1 episode)
- Helen Dallimore as Peggy (1 episode)
- Leon Ford as Gavin (1 episode)
- Lucy Durack as Nicola (1 episode)
- Madeleine Madden as Lucy (1 episode)
- Marshall Napier as Howard Benson (3 episodes)
- Millie Rose Heywood as Laura (2 episodes)
- Natasha Beaumont as Oksana (1 episode)
- Odessa Young as Fran (1 episode)
- Ryan Corr as Sammy (1 episode)
- Sarah Snook as Louise (1 episode)
- Steve Le Marquand as Donny Lannagan (1 episode)
- Steve Rodgers as Clive Carlyle (1 episode)
- Vanessa Downing as Robin Benson (1 episode)

== Episodes ==
No.	Title	Original release date
1	"Australia Day"	5 February 2014
It's been 12 months since we last saw the Moody family. Maree and Kevin have put the Moody home up for sale, outraging Sean. He's refusing to leave his house and is squatting in his old room. Dan and Cora have returned home from the UK and, in an attempt to impress Cora's family, Dan invites them to Uncle Terry's Australia Day BBQ. Loaded up like a packhorse, Terry arrives early on Australia Day and claims the best spot in the park. However, he's not the only one. A quarrel with an Aboriginal family ensues until a compromise is reached and the two families decide to share lunch. But the barbecue disintegrates into another Moody disaster after a flag is accidentally burnt, Dan is stung by a bluebottle and an unexpected visitor returns after a year at sea.
2	"Happy Anniversary Kevin and Maree"	12 February 2014
The Moody family gathers at the local RSL to celebrate Kev and Maree's wedding anniversary. But in usual Moody style, the celebrations are disrupted. Rhys (David Field) drops in to say congratulations; however he's only there to hit up Maree for a cut of their mother's inheritance. There's a dispute over the meat raffle and Terry's new girlfriend, Yvonne (Sacha Horler), shows she's a force to be reckoned with. Dan meets the Gaming and Operations Manager, Louise (Sarah Snook), who turns out to be an old university friend who is clearly still attracted to him. Bridget, meanwhile, has an auction to attend. She cajoles Cora into starting off the bidding and ends up in an awkward situation that is not easy to escape from. Back at the RSL, Sean is stunned to find his ex-girlfriend Peggy (Helen Dallimore) playing the pokies and is even more shocked to discover why she's really there – and who she's there with.
3	"Bridget's Surprise 40th"	19 February 2014
The Moody family organises a surprise 40th birthday party for Bridget, the biggest surprise being that she isn't actually 40. On the day, Roger attempts to distract Bridget with a string of activities, however despite his best intentions it ends badly – especially the glycolic acid facial. As the party kicks off, an immovable Aussie meets an irresistible Russian when Terry brings Yvonne, even though he has gone cold on the relationship, and Sean invites Terry's old flame Oksana (Natasha Beaumont). Auctioneer Matt (Jonny Pasvolsky) shows up late, telling Bridget that she's "looking pretty good for 40". Her mood perks up considerably under Matt's attention and they end up fooling around in Matt's car, infuriating Roger. To cap off the night, Roger's 'gift' for Bridget – a male exotic dancer – arrives and performs a high-energy erotic dance, his final reveal leaving them all gobsmacked.
4	"Easter Epiphanies"	26 February 2014
It's the annual Moody family Easter Weekend, when the whole clan goes to a holiday park on the NSW south coast. 'House proud' Kev sets up camp around his beloved RV while Sean books himself, Dan, Terry and Cora into a single, tiny Viscount for the weekend, much to Cora's chagrin. Admiring more than the RV, Maree and Kev are invited to join the Australian Cruising Drivers' Club by President Clive Carlyle (Steve Rodgers), however they get more than they bargained for; and Sean is out-scammed by a bunch of teenagers who ask him to buy them beer. Meanwhile, Cora and Bridget, disgusted by the state of the amenities at the campsite, jump the fence of a nearby resort; and Terry goes for a long bicycle ride and has an epiphany about Yvonne. Somehow the Moodys manage to upset the locals and holidaymakers and are ejected from the campsite. The only ones not thrown out are Dan and Cora, who finally get the van to themselves.
5	"Sean's Day in Court"	5 March 2014
Sean accidentally hits a penguin while careering across the harbour on a jet ski, drunk, and ends up in court. However, his court date clashes with Terry's local election fundraiser. With both Terry and Sean demanding full family support on the day, the pair pick teams like schoolyard footy captains. Meanwhile, Cora's handsome, lip-kissing brother Sammy (Ryan Corr) has come to stay. He's broken up with his girlfriend Laura (Millie Rose Heywood), and needs a place to crash. Dan is confronted by Sammy's closer-than-normal relationship with Cora. Is it normal for adult siblings to share a bed? But after a rough day all round, the Moodys resolve their differences with a good old-fashioned game of front yard footy, and Terry lets off some steam.
6	"Vote 1 Terry Moody!"	12 March 2014
Terry, in the final run up to his council election, is feeling terrible and requires blood tests; Sean, as self-appointed campaign manager, decides this is a great opportunity for gaining voter sympathy. The financial stress of the election is taking its toll; so too is breaking up with Yvonne. Dan, who's lost his eyebrows working for Dying High, seeks financial advice from Cora's father after Cora receives notice she's to be audited. The situation could be dire, as Cora hasn't lodged a tax return, ever. Howard (Marshall Napier) promptly sorts out Cora's business affairs, and then switches his attention to Dan. Meanwhile, Bridget squares up to telling Matt he's about to become a father. He asks if she's sure it's his, but there haven't been any others. Explaining she expects nothing of him, he questions why she'd tell him at all.
7	"Baby Shower Blues"	19 March 2014
Roger hosts Bridget's baby shower and tries to start some rather odd party games, apparently all in the name of tradition. Much to Sean's delight, Maree digs out Bobby, Dan's 'crying' baby doll that he had until he was 12 years old. Cora grimaces at talk of 'her turn' as she's not entirely sure a baby is in her future plans at all. Dan is thrown by Cora's comment, as this is a revelation to him. When Matt turns up to Bridget's baby shower, Roger feels every bit the 'jilted lover'. Bridget asks him to give her and Matt some time alone, so he watches on from afar, comforted by a rather bemused Maree. Meanwhile, Terry is down and out about the election backlash and Yvonne brings his favourite meal, a Honghoe, confiscated from customs, to commiserate. Could this offer of fermented fish be the olive branch Terry is hoping for? In an attempt at a token 'family', Dan gives Cora a dog. But when she takes it to the park and lets it off the leash, the dog runs off and is nowhere to be found. This disintegrates into a fight, revealing that the dog was a test for Cora. Both are confused and upset; could this be the end for Dan and Cora?
8	"Commitments"	26 March 2014
A wedding dress is fitted, cufflinks donned, women's hair arranged and shoes shined – but who's getting married? The bridal party is getting ready at Bridget's house. Cora has arrived back from Melbourne but hasn't seen Dan yet; and Yvonne emerges looking radiant, before managing to offend most of the family one by one with a backhanded compliment. However, the wedding is unexpectedly delayed by a trip to the hospital and a garbage truck. Eager to continue with the ceremony, Terry suggests a venue change. Dan and Cora jump to the task of reorganising the event and end up taking a memorable hot air balloon ride… Meanwhile, Colin Rosebloom (Glenn Hazeldine), son to Joyce, is going ballistic. He claims that Sean's negligence has caused his mother an injury and is demanding compensation. Sean and Scotty (Dave Eastgate) try to outsmart Colin, but their plan backfires and Colin imprisons Scotty and attempts to blackmail Sean.
