= Darren Gilshenan =

Australian actor and writer

- Education: National Institute of Dramatic Art
- Occupations: Actor, writer
- Known for: Full Frontal; The Moodys

Darren Gilshenan is an Australian actor and writer. He is best known for his roles in television series The Moodys, Maximum Choppage, Chandon Pictures, and Full Frontal.

== Early life and education ==
Growing up in Brisbane, Darren Gilshenan was first introduced to acting through performing in a Gang Show while a Boy Scout. He realised then that acting was his passion.

Gilshenan graduated from the National Institute of Dramatic Art (NIDA).

== Career ==
Gilshenan has also taught extensively at Australian Theatre for Young People, Bell Shakespeare and NIDA.

His early acting career includes guest roles in A Country Practice in 1992 and Police Rescue in 1993. He became a series regular (and writer) on the sketch comedy series Full Frontal in 1997. The show became Totally Full Frontal, where he remained as writer and actor in 1998 and 1999.

In 2002, he had a role in Dossa and Joe. He then had a major role in both seasons of Chandon Pictures, which aired from 2007 until 2009.

In 2010, Gilshenan guest directed Accidental Death of an Anarchist. In 2013, he starred in The Elegant Gentleman's Guide to Knife Fighting. In 2014, he starred in the comedy The Moodys and drama Rake. In 2016, he appeared on the sitcom Here Come the Habibs.

In 2023, Gilshenan was announced as part of the cast for Stan series Thou Shalt Not Steal. He also starred in Stan series Population 11. On 22 November 2024, it was announced that Gilshenan was a part of the filming for feature film Pickpockets. On 4 June 2025, Gilshenan was named as part of the extended cast for Stan series Gnomes.

== Filmography ==
=== Films ===
Year	Title	Role	Notes
1995	Swinger	John	Short film
1996	Idiot Box	C.E.S. Man	
1998	Gristle	Peter	Short film
1998	Dark City	Fingerprint Cop	
2012	Save Your Legs!	Colin	
2013	Bamboozled	Bamboozled Host	Short film
2013	Boarders	Sheppo	Short film
2014	Blood Pulls a Gun	Angry Motel Guest	Short film
2015	Women He's Undressed	Orry-Kelly	Documentary
2023	A Savage Christmas	Uncle Dick	Feature film
2023	Christmess	Nick	Feature film
2024	Take My Hand	Peter	
2024	Audrey	Physio	
2025	Pickpockets	TBA	Post production

=== Television ===
Year	Title	Role	Notes
1992	A Country Practice	Malcolm Fairfax	Episode: "Travelling South: Part 1"
1993	Police Rescue	Nick	Episode: "Wild Goose Chase"
1997	Full Frontal	Various characters	20 episodes
1998–1999	Totally Full Frontal	Various characters	28 episodes
2002	Dossa and Joe	Wayne	6 episodes
2007–2009	Chandon Pictures	Nick Brenner	16 episodes
2012	A Moody Christmas	Terry Moody	6 episodes
2013	The Outlaw Michael Howe	Lieutenant Governor Tom Davey	TV movie
2013	The Elegant Gentleman's Guide to Knife Fighting	Various characters	6 episodes
2013	Top of the Lake	Bob Platt	2 episodes
2014	Wonderland	Lyle Newell	2 episodes
2014	Devil's Playground	Father Lenken	Miniseries, 2 episodes
2014	Old School	John Stoyanov	Episode: "Easy Money"
2014	The Killing Field	Brian Fleet	TV movie
2014	Janet King	Alex Moreno	4 episodes
2014	Rake	Advisor Selwyn	6 episodes
2014	The Moodys	Terry Moody	Miniseries, 8 episodes
2015	Maximum Choppage	Mayor Crawford	6 episodes
2015–2018	No Activity	Det. Stokes	Main cast Writer
2016	Here Come the Habibs!	Jack O'Neill	6 episodes
2018–2021	Harrow	Lyle Ridgewell Livingston Fairley	30 episodes
2020	Stateless	Brian Ashworth	6 episodes
2022–2026	Colin from Accounts	Professor Lee	14 episodes
2023	The Appleton Ladies' Potato Race	Billy Pope	TV movie
2023	Plausible Deniability	Archbishop Muntz	2 episodes
2024	Thou Shall Not Steal	Mick	TV series
2024	Nautilus	Punch	6 episodes
2024	Population 11	Hugo Drivas	6 episodes
2026	Two Years Later	Bill	1 episode (1.5)
2026	Gnomes	Mayor Lachlan Morrison	TV series

== Theatre ==
=== As actor ===
Year	Title	Role	Notes
1984	Insomnia		SGIO Theatre, Brisbane
1987	The Man Who Came to Dinner		NIDA Theatre, Sydney
1988	Veneer 1		NIDA Theatre, Sydney
1989–1990	Big River: The Adventures of Huckleberry Finn	Tom Sawyer	Australian tour
1990	Moby Dick	Captain Peleg	Suncorp Theatre, Brisbane with QTC, Marian St Theatre, Sydney
1990	Beach Blanket Tempest	Frankie / Ian Harpy	Q Theatre, Penrith
	Wild Garden Tales (self-devised)	Performer	Stables Theatre, Sydney with Young at Art
1991	Hansel and Gretel		Belvoir St Theatre, Sydney
1992	Wet and Dry		Stables Theatre, Sydney
1992	11 PM Sharp		Stables Theatre, Sydney
1992	The Adventures of Snugglepot and Cuddlepie		Stables Theatre, Sydney
1992	Wild Garden Tales		Stables Theatre, Sydney
	Ginger Meggs	Ginger Meggs	Victorian Arts Centre
1993	Daylight Saving	Jason Strutt	Q Theatre, Penrith
1993	Three Stories High / 1000 Nights	Self-devised	Stables Theatre, Sydney with Young at Art
1994	The Taming of The Shrew	Grumio	Australian tour with Bell Shakespeare
1994	Macbeth	A Weird Sister / Seyton / Third Assassin	Australian tour with Bell Shakespeare
1995	Twelfth Night	Feste	Australian tour with Bell Shakespeare
1995	Pericles	Fisherman / Knight	Australian tour with Bell Shakespeare
1995	Rosencrantz and Guildenstern are Dead	Player	Belvoir St Theatre, Sydney
1996	Much Ado About Nothing	Dogberry	Melbourne Athenaeum, Sydney Opera House, Canberra Theatre with Bell Shakespeare
1996	The Players	Ensemble	Stables Theatre, Sydney with Pork Chop Productions
1996	Coriolanus	Ensemble	Melbourne Athenaeum, Sydney Opera House with Bell Shakespeare
	The Popular Mechanicals	Snug	Riverina Theatre Company
1997	Titanic		Cambridge Park Inn, Sydney
1998	Henry IV	Hotspur / Pistol – Soldier 1	Australian tour with Bell Shakespeare
1999	Alive at Williamstown Pier		Butter Factory Theatre, Wodonga, Stables Theatre, Sydney with Griffin Theatre Company
1999	The Venetian Twins	The Twins	Tilbury Productions for Olympic Arts Festival
1999	Henry V	Pistol	Melbourne Athenaeum, Playhouse Canberra, Sydney Opera House with Bell Shakespeare
2001	The Complete Works of William Shakespeare (Abridged)	Various characters	Sydney Opera House
2001	Julius Caesar	Lepidus / Trebonius	Australian tour with Bell Shakespeare
2001	Antony and Cleopatra	Clown / Eros / Lepidus	Australian tour with Bell Shakespeare
2002	Richard III	Rivers / Stanley	Australian tour with Bell Shakespeare
2002	The Comedy of Errors	Dromio of Syracuse	Australian tour with Bell Shakespeare
2002	Last Cab to Darwin	Various characters	Pork Chop Productions
2003	The Complete Works of William Shakespeare (Abridged)		Sydney Opera House
2003–2004	The Servant of Two Masters	Truffaldino	Australian national tour with Bell Shakespeare
2004	The Comedy of Errors	Dromio of Syracuse	Theatre Royal, Hobart with Bell Shakespeare
2005	Harry the Sixth		Sydney Opera House with Bell Shakespeare
2005	Edward IV		Sydney Opera House with Bell Shakespeare
2005	Wars of the Roses	Dauphin / Saunder Simcox / Richard, Duke of Gloucester	Australian tour with Bell Shakespeare
2005	Measure for Measure	Pompey, a pimp	Australian tour with Bell Shakespeare
2005	The Servant of Two Masters	Truffaldino	Sydney Theatre
2006	The Comedy of Errors	Dromio of Syracuse	Grand Theatre, Blackpool, Theatre Royal, Bath with Bell Shakespeare
2006	Urinetown	Mr McQueen	Sydney Theatre with MTC / STC
2007	The Adventures of Snugglepot & Cuddlepie and Little Ragged Blossom	Cuddlepie	Theatre Royal, Sydney, Regal Theatre, Perth, Dunstan Playhouse Adelaide with Company B Belvoir
2007	The Complete Works of William Shakespeare (Abridged)		Cremorne Theatre, Brisbane
2007	Not Like Beckett	Beckett	Star Court Theatre, Lismore
2007	The Government Inspector	Various roles (including Klestakov)	Australian tour with Bell Shakespeare
2008	Strange Attractor	Colin	Stables Theatre, Sydney with Griffin Theatre Company
2008	Elling	Elling	Wharf Theatre, Sydney with STC
2009	Tot Mom	Various characters	Wharf Theatre, Sydney with STC
2010	The Beauty Queen of Leenane	Pato Dooley	Wharf Theatre, Sydney with STC
2010	Tragedy Workshop	Willy Loman	STC
2010	Our Town	Stage Manager	Sydney Opera House
2011	Don Parties On	Richard	Playhouse, Melbourne, Sydney Theatre with MTC
2011	The White Guard	Alexei	Sydney Theatre with STC
2011	Loot	Inspector Truscott	Sydney Opera House with STC
2011	Fool's Island	Fool (Gooden / Badden)	Bondi Pavilion, Sydney with Tamarama Rock Surfers / STC
2012	Elling	Elling	Southbank Theatre, Melbourne
	The Beast (workshop)	Various characters	MTC
	The Waiting Room (workshop)	Raf	STC
	The Mayor's Nest (workshop)	Various characters	Riverside Theatres Parramatta
	Helicopter (script reading)	HE	Griffin Theatre Company
2014	Absent Friends	Colin	Ensemble Theatre, Sydney
2014–2015	Mother and Son	Arthur	Comedy Theatre, Melbourne, Playhouse, Brisbane
2014–2015	Monkey: Journey to the West	Piggsy / Heavenly Staffer / Monk	Australian tour
	The Man's Bitch (reading)	Frederick Wilson / Edward White / Radio Host	STC
2015	Strictly Ballroom the Musical	Doug Hastings / Merv	Her Majesty's Theatre, Melbourne, Lyric Theatre, Brisbane
2016	Machu Picchu	Paul	Wharf Theatre, Sydney, Dunstan Playhouse, Adelaide with STC
2016	Tartuffe	Tartuffe	Heath Ledger Theatre, Perth, Playhouse, Brisbane with QTC / Black Swan Theatre Company
2017	Who's Afraid of Virginia Woolf?	George	Ensemble Theatre, Sydney
	Once in a Blue Moon (workshop)	Various characters	CDP Productions
2018	The Hypochondriac	Argan	Darlinghurst Theatre, Sydney
2022	The Caretaker	Davies	Ensemble Theatre, Sydney

=== As writer / director ===
Year	Title	Role	Notes
1996	The Players	Writer	Stables Theatre with Pork Chop Productions
	Recital for Japan	Director	Bell Shakespeare
2003	Hamlet	Movement Director	Bell Shakespeare
	Last Cab to Darwin	Assistant Director	Pork Chop Productions
	The Complete Works of William Shakespeare (Abridged)	Director	Spirit Entertainment
2004	The Comedy of Errors	Movement Director	Theatre Royal, Hobart with Bell Shakespeare
	A Midsummer Nights Dream	Co-Director	NIDA Theatre, Sydney
	The Servant of Two Masters	Director	NIDA Third Year Actors
	The Popular Mechanicals	Director	NIDA Third Year Actors
2010	Accidental Death of an Anarchist	Director	NIDA Summer School
	The Jinglist	Director	The Edinburgh Festival
	Loot	Director	NIDA Third Year Actors
	The Chaos Fairy	Director	Monkey Baa
	The Birthday Boys	Director	NIDA Independent
2016	Poetry at Play	Director	Poetry in Action
2016	The Paper Tiger	Director	Poetry in Action
2016	The Poet's Quest	Director	Poetry in Action
	Parting the Red Curtain	Director	Neil Gooding Productions
2020	The Government Inspector	Director	NIDA Parade 2 Studio
