= Phil Lloyd (actor) =

Australian actor and scriptwriter

Phil Lloyd is an Australian actor and scriptwriter and partner in the production company Jungleboys. He is best known for his acting role as Myles Barlow in the Australian TV series, Review with Myles Barlow (2008) and the comedy series At Home with Julia, where he played Tim Mathieson, the partner of prime minister Julia Gillard.

== Career ==
Lloyd has been a scriptwriter for a number of years. Since 2004 he has been part of Australian soap opera Home and Away's core writing team. He also served as an associate script co-producer (a role shared with scriptwriter Faith McKinnon) for about 18 months.

He became more well known in 2008 with the debut of Review with Myles Barlow, which he co-wrote with Trent O'Donnell, and starred in as Myles.

Lloyd is co-creator, co-writer, co-star (as Prime Minister Julia Gillard's romantic partner Tim Mathieson) of the sitcom At Home with Julia, which aired on ABC1 in 2011.

In 2012 he wrote and produced the ABC TV series A Moody Christmas for Jungleboys Australia.

In 2013 he created, was a contributing writer and acted in The Elegant Gentleman's Guide to Knife Fighting, a sketch comedy show for the ABC TV.

Lloyd's writing credits also include FARMkids and The Trophy Room.

== Recognition and awards ==
Lloyd received Australian Film Institute Awards in 2009 and 2010 for both Best Performance in a Television Comedy Series and Best Television Comedy Series, for Review with Myles Barlow.

Lloyd, together with Trent O'Donnell, both from Jungle Entertainment, were awarded the Fred Parsons Award for Outstanding Contribution to Australian Comedy at the AWGIE Awards 2022.

== Filmography ==
=== Actor ===
Year	Title	Role	Type
2002	Tiny Little Pieces	Radio Announcer (voice)	Short film
2003	Big Bite	Apprentice Tradie	TV series, 1 episode
2008	Review with Myles Barlow	Myles Barlow	TV series, 12 episodes
2011	Laid	Cab Driver	TV series, 1 episode
2011	The Great Crusade	Toby Withers	TV series
2011	Wild Boys	Main Trooper	TV series, 1 episode
2011	At Home with Julia	Tim Mathieson	TV series, 4 episodes
2012	Woodley	Dr Plimpton	TV series, 1 episode
2012	Team 11	Stuart	TV movie
2012	Rake	Lane Hole	TV series, 1 episode
2012	A Moody Christmas	Roger Quaill	Miniseries, 6 episodes
2013	The Elegant Gentleman's Guide to Knife Fighting	Various characters	Miniseries, 6 episodes
2014	It’s a Date	Brad Butler	TV series, 1 episode
2016-17	Here Come the Habibs	Club Commodore	TV series, 2 episodes
2017	True Story with Hamish & Andy	Dr Gary	TV series, 1 episode
2018	Sando	Don Sandringham	Miniseries, 6 episodes
2018	Pilot Week	Harry Telford	TV series, 1 episode
2018	How to Stay Married: Terry’s Talks	Brad Butler	TV series
2020	The Secrets She Keeps	Dave	TV series, 3 episodes
2020	Drunk History Australia	Major G P W Meredith / Robert Greenhill	TV series, 2 episodes
2018-21	How to Stay Married	Brad Butler	TV series, 18 episodes

=== Writer ===
Year	Title	Role	Type
2002	Tiny Little Pieces	Writer	Short film
2004-12	Home and Away	Writer	TV series, 55 episodes
2007-08	FARMkids	Writer	TV series, 2 episodes
2008	Review with Myles Barlow	Writer	TV series, 13 episodes
2010	The Trophy Room	Writer	Quiz show, 2 episodes
2011	The Great Crusade	Writer	TV series
2011	At Home with Julia	Writer	TV series, 4 episodes
2011-12	Winners & Losers	Writer	TV series, 2 episodes
2012	Laid	Writer - Additional material	TV series, 6 episodes
2012	The Moodys	Writer	Miniseries, 6 episodes
2012	A Moody Christmas	Writer	Miniseries, 6 episodes
2013	The Elegant Gentleman's Guide to Knife Fighting	Writer	Miniseries, 6 episodes
2013-14	Neighbours	Writer	TV series, 11 episodes
2015	8MMM Aboriginal Radio	Story Editor	TV series, 2 episodes
2014-17	Here Come the Habibs	Creator	TV series, 22 episodes
2018	Sando	Creator	TV series, 6 episodes
2019	Bad Mothers	Writer	Miniseries
