= Helen Thomson (actress) =

Australian actress

- Education: University of Southern Queensland (USQ)
- Years active: 1990–present
- Known for: Elvis (2022); Colin from Accounts
- Spouse: David Roberts (m. 2000)
- Children: 2

Helen Thomson is an Australian actress. She is best known for her role as Gladys Presley in the biographical film Elvis (2022).

== Early life ==
Thomson grew up on a farm outside Thangool in central Queensland, as one of five children.

At the age of 14, her mother took her to see a stage production of Steaming at Rockhampton's Pilbeam Theatre, in which Genevieve Lemon's performance inspired her to become an actor. She went on to study drama at the University of Southern Queensland (USQ).

== Career ==
=== Theatre ===
When Thomson began her acting career, she was cast as Abigail Williams in a 1991 Queensland Theatre Company production of The Crucible, which she credits with helping launch her career.

Her early stage roles include playing Desdemona in Othello and appearing opposite Geoffery Rush in The Dutch Courtesan, both at the Melbourne Theatre Company, after which time she relocated to Sydney. She went on to appear in numerous productions for the Sydney Theatre Company including Tom Stoppard's Arcadia, a Judy Davis-directed production of The School for Scandal and God of Carnage.

Thomson received a 2011 Helpmann Awards nomination for her performance in In the Next Room (or The Vibrator Play). Roles in productions of Ray Lawler's Summer of the Seventeenth Doll (2012), The Effect (2013), After Dinner (2015), The Harp in the South: Part One and Part Two (2019) and Mary Stuart (2019) also saw her nominated for Helpmann Awards, resulting in a win for After Dinner.

Thomson also featured in Measure for Measure for Belvoir Theatre Company. In 2024, she appeared in Belvoir's production of August: Osage County.

=== Television ===
Thomson has appeared in numerous television shows including A Country Practice, Water Rats, Blue Heelers, Stupid Stupid Man and Bad Mothers. Other credits include Jane Campion's Top of the Lake: China Girl, Fires and playing Prime Minister Angela Sway in season 5 of Rake opposite Richard Roxburgh.

She plays Ashley's mother Lynelle, in multi-award winning Australian dramedy television series Colin from Accounts. Her performance saw her nominated for Best Acting in a Comedy at the 2024 AACTA Awards, while as part of the cast she won a 2023 Equity Ensemble Award for Outstanding Performance by an Ensemble in a Comedy Series.

In 2025 Thomson appeared in Foxtel series The Last Anniversary, executive produced by Nicole Kidman and based on the hit novel by Liane Moriarty.

=== Film ===
Thomson's film credits include comedy drama La Spagnola (2002) and A Man's Gotta Do (2004). She received an Australian Film Institute Awards nomination for her role in 2003 comedy crime thriller Gettin' Square, in which she starred opposite Timothy Spall and Sam Worthington.

She portrayed Gladys Presley, the mother of Elvis Presley (played by Austin Butler), in the 2022 Baz Luhrmann biographical film Elvis. She scored the role after Maggie Gyllenhaal was unable to take part, and after one of Luhrmann's assistants had seen her in a stage production of George Bernard Shaw's Mrs. Warren's Profession.

In 2025, she appeared in comedy film Spit, a spin-off of Gettin' Square.

She has been a frequent collaborator with her husband David Roberts, including in television series Colin from Accounts, the films A Savage Christmas (2023) and Spit (2025) and a stage production of In the Next Room (or The Vibrator Play).

== Personal life ==
Thomson is married to fellow actor David Roberts. Together they have two children and reside at Wentworth Falls in the Blue Mountains, west of Sydney.

== Awards and nominations ==
Year	Work	Award	Category	Result	Ref.
2003	Gettin' Square	Australian Film Institute Awards	Best Actress in a Supporting Role	Nominated	
2011	In the Next Room (or The Vibrator Play)	Helpmann Awards	Best Female Actor in a Supporting Role in a Play	Nominated	
2012	Summer of the Seventeenth Doll	Helpmann Awards	Best Female Actor in a Play	Nominated	
2013	The Effect	Helpmann Awards	Best Female Actor in a Supporting Role in a Play	Nominated	
2015	After Dinner	Helpmann Awards	Best Female Actor in a Supporting Role in a Play	Won	
2019	The Harp in the South: Part One and Part Two	Helpmann Awards	Best Female Actor in a Supporting Role in a Play	Nominated	
2019	Mary Stuart	Helpmann Awards	Best Female Actor in a Play	Nominated	
2023	Elvis	CinEuphoria Awards	Best Ensemble – International Competition	Nominated	
2023	Colin from Accounts	Equity Ensemble Awards	Outstanding Performance by an Ensemble in a Comedy Series	Won	
2024	Colin from Accounts	AACTA Awards	Best Acting in a Comedy	Nominated	

== Filmography ==
=== Film ===
Year	Title	Role	Notes	Ref.
1990	Bloodmoon	Mary Huston		
1997	Thank God He Met Lizzie (aka The Wedding Party)	Emma		
1999	Strange Planet	Lulu		
2001	La Spagnola	Wendy		
2003	Kangaroo Jack	TV Announcer		
2003	Gettin' Square	Marion Barrington		
2003	The Rage in Placid Lake	Teacher 1		
2003	Redskin		Short film	
2004	A Man's Gotta Do	Tina		
2022	Elvis	Gladys Presley		
2023	The Rooster	Lorraine		
2023	A Savage Christmas	Brenda Savage		
2025	Spit	Marion Barrington		

=== Television ===
Year	Title	Role	Notes	Ref
1993	A Country Practice	Charlotte O'Neill	2 episodes: "Floating on Air: Parts 1 & 2"	
1994	G.P.	Janine	Episode: "Breaking Out"	
1996	Water Rats	Anne Harvey	Episode: "Pay Back"	
1997	Home and Away	Claudia Miles	Episode #1.2137	
1997	Big Sky	Tessa Coburn	Episode: "You Must Remember This"	
1998	Murder Call	Chyna Gold	Episode: "Dared to Death"	
2000	Nowhere to Land	Claire Munson	TV film	
2001	Water Rats	Nerida	Episode: "Another Man's Poison"	
2002	White Collar Blue	Rita Calliope	Episode #1.4	
2002–2003	Bad Cop, Bad Cop	Tracy Lafever	8 episodes	
2003	Blue Heelers	Dr. Tatiana Zylinski	6 episodes	
2003	Stingers	Selma Katsonis	Episode: "Conversations with the Dead"	
2003	MDA	Nerida Bailey	2 episodes	
2003	Kath & Kim	Receptionist	Episode: "The Moon"	
2005	BlackJack: In the Money	Sandra Miller	TV film	
2008	The Informant	Lucy Norris	TV film	
2006–2008	Stupid, Stupid Man	Carol Van Dyke	9 episodes	
2007	All Saints	Sharon Cox	Episode: "Smoke and Mirrors"	
2007	Bastard Boys	Valerie Corrigan	Miniseries, 4 episodes	
2009	The Jesters	Harriet	Episode: "Hard Time Getting Soft Time"	
2009	30 Seconds	Faith O'Callaghan	Episode: "A Matter of Trust"	
2012	Nick & Seaton's Palace of Sexy Secrets	Various	2 episodes	
2013	Mr & Mrs Murder	Olivia Patterson	Episode: "The Art of Murder"	
2014	Wonderland	Jackie Page	Episode: "Monogamy"	
2014	Rake	Margot	Episode #3.2	
2015	Catching Milat	Dr. Miriam Bentley	Miniseries, episode #1.1	
2016	Love Child	Eleanor	Episode #3.4	
2016–2017	Doctor Doctor	Nora Gunbleton	Season 2, 4 episodes	
2017	Top of the Lake	Felicity	3 episodes	
2017	Pulse	Lorraine Walsh	2 episodes	
2017	A Place to Call Home	Gerda Davis	2 episodes	
2018	Rake	PM Angela Way	3 episodes	
2019	Bad Mothers	Liz	7 episodes	
2021	Fires	Yvonne Webber	2 episodes	
2022	Irreverent	Antoinette	4 episodes	
2022–2026	Colin from Accounts	Lynelle	17 episodes	
2023	One Night	Lindy	3 episodes	
2023	Wolf Like Me	Jackie	Episode #2.1	
2025	The Last Anniversary	Enigma	6 episodes	
2025	Ghosts: Australia	Joy	1 episode (1.6)	
2025	NCIS: Sydney	Bridgette	1 episode (3.4)	
2025	Return to Paradise	Miranda East	1 episode (2.5)	

== Theatre ==
Year	Title	Role	Notes	Ref
1990	The Tempest	Iris	La Boite Theatre, Brisbane	
1991	Kaspajack		Queensland Theatre Company with Brolgas Youth Theatre	
1991	If Only We Had a Cat		Queensland Theatre Company with Brolgas Youth Theatre	
1991	On the Verge	Alex	La Boite Theatre, Brisbane	
1991	A Midsummer Night’s Dream	Helena	La Boite Theatre, Brisbane	
1991	The Crucible	Abigail Williams	Queensland Theatre Company	
1991	The Selection	Dora Pettigrew	Playhouse, Melbourne with MTC	
1992	Othello	Desdemona	Arts Centre, Melbourne with MTC	
1992	A Dickens Christmas	Miss Zoe	Playbox Theatre Company, Melbourne	
1992	A View from the Bridge	Catherine	Playhouse, Melbourne with MTC	
1993	The Dutch Courtesan	Francheschina	Playhouse, Melbourne with MTC	
1993	Much Ado About Nothing	Margaret	Playhouse, Melbourne with MTC	
1994	The Shaughraun	Arte O'Neil	Sydney Opera House with STC / Playhouse, Melbourne with MTC	
1994	Arcadia		Sydney Opera House with STC	
1995	A Midsummer Night’s Dream	Hippolyta / Titania	Elston Hocking & Woods	
1996	Coralie Lansdowne Says No	Coralie Lansdowne	Griffin Theatre Company, Sydney	
1996–1997	The John Wayne Principle	Fiona Ellston / Sarah Stich	Wharf Theatre, Sydney with STC & Melbourne tour with Playbox Theatre Company	
1997	Romeo and Juliet	Lady Capulet	EHJ Productions	
1998	Killing & Chilling of Annabelle Lee	Christina Muzy / Various	Griffin Theatre Company, Sydney	
1999	The Taming of the Shrew	Kate	EHJ Productions	
1999	Popcorn	Brooke	Picture This Productions	
1999	Footprints on Water	Lena	Neonheart Theatre Company	
2000–2001	Troilus and Cressida	Helen	Melbourne Athenaeum, Playhouse, Canberra, Sydney Opera House with Bell Shakespeare	
2001	The School for Scandal	Lady Sneerwell	Sydney Opera House with STC	
2002	The Virgin Mim	Kelly	Wharf Theatre, Sydney with STC	
2004	Hinterland	Winsome Snell	Arts Centre Melbourne with MTC	
2006	Macbeth	Lady Macbeth	Sydney Theatre Company	
2007	The Season at Sarsaparilla	Julia Sheen	Sydney Opera House with STC	
2007	The Art of War	Hannah	Wharf Theatre, Sydney with STC	
2007	A Midsummer Night’s Dream	Quince	Sydney Theatre with STC	
2009	God of Carnage	Annette Reille	Sydney Opera House with STC	
2010	Measure for Measure	Mistress Overdone / Mariana	Belvoir St Theatre, Sydney	
2011	In the Next Room (or The Vibrator Play)	Sabrina Daldry	Sydney Theatre Company	
2011–2012	Summer of the Seventeenth Doll	Pearl Cunningham	Belvoir Theatre Company, Arts Centre Melbourne with MTC	
2012	Under Milk Wood	Rosie Probert / Mrs Pugh / Mrs Dai Bread 1 / Gossamer Beynon / Mrs Cherry Owen	Wharf Theatre, Sydney with STC	
2012	The Splinter	Mother	Wharf Theatre, Sydney with STC	
2013	Mrs. Warren's Profession	Mrs. Kitty Warren	Wharf Theatre, Sydney with STC	
2014	The Winter's Tale	Hermione	Sydney Opera House with Bell Shakespeare	
2014	Cruise Control	Imogen	Ensemble Theatre, Sydney	
2014	Children of the Sun	Melaniya	Sydney Opera House with STC	
2015	After Dinner	Monica	Wharf Theatre, Sydney with STC	
2015	King Lear	Regan	Roslyn Packer Theatre, Sydney with STC	
2015	Ivanov	Zinaida Lebedev	Belvoir Theatre Company	
2016	Hay Fever	Myra Arundel	Sydney Opera House with STC	
2017	Hir	Paige	Belvoir Theatre Company	
2017	Mark Colvin's Kidney	Elle Macpherson / others	Belvoir Theatre Company	
2018	Top Girls	Marlene	Sydney Opera House with STC	
2018	The Harp in the South	Delie Stock	Roslyn Packer Theatre, Sydney with STC	
2019	Mary Stuart	Queen Elizabeth	Roslyn Packer Theatre, Sydney with STC	
2019	Things I Know to Be True	Fran	Belvoir Theatre Company	
2020	No Pay? No Way!		Sydney Opera House with STC	
2021	Death of a Salesman	Linda Loman	Roslyn Packer Theatre, Sydney with STC	
2023	The Importance of Being Earnest	Lady Bracknell	Roslyn Packer Theatre, Sydney with STC	
2024	August: Osage County	Mattie Fae	Belvoir St Theatre, Sydney	
