= Cat show =

Judged event

A cat show is a judged event where the owners of cats compete to win titles in various cat registering organizations by entering their cats to be judged after a breed standard. Both pedigreed and companion (or moggy) cats are admissible, although the rules differ from organization to organization. Cats are compared to a breed standard, and the owners of those judged to be closest to it are awarded a prize. Moggys are judged based on their temperament. Often, at the end of the year, all of the points accrued at various shows are added up and more national and regional titles are awarded.

== History ==
The first cat show took place at the Crystal Palace in London in 1871. It was organised by Harrison Weir.

== Australia ==
In Australia, the shows can be either "closed style" or "open style" judging. In closed shows, the cats are placed in undecorated cages with white curtains and a bed. The owners must then leave the hall. The judges for each ring will examine each animal in turn and decide on awards. Then the owner may return. In open style, the owners and other spectators may stay to watch the judging, as the judges talk to them about the cats. Some popular events that hosts cat shows include the annual Sydney Royal Easter Show held at Sydney's Olympic Park, and the Cat Lovers Show, held in Melbourne and Sydney.

== Europe ==
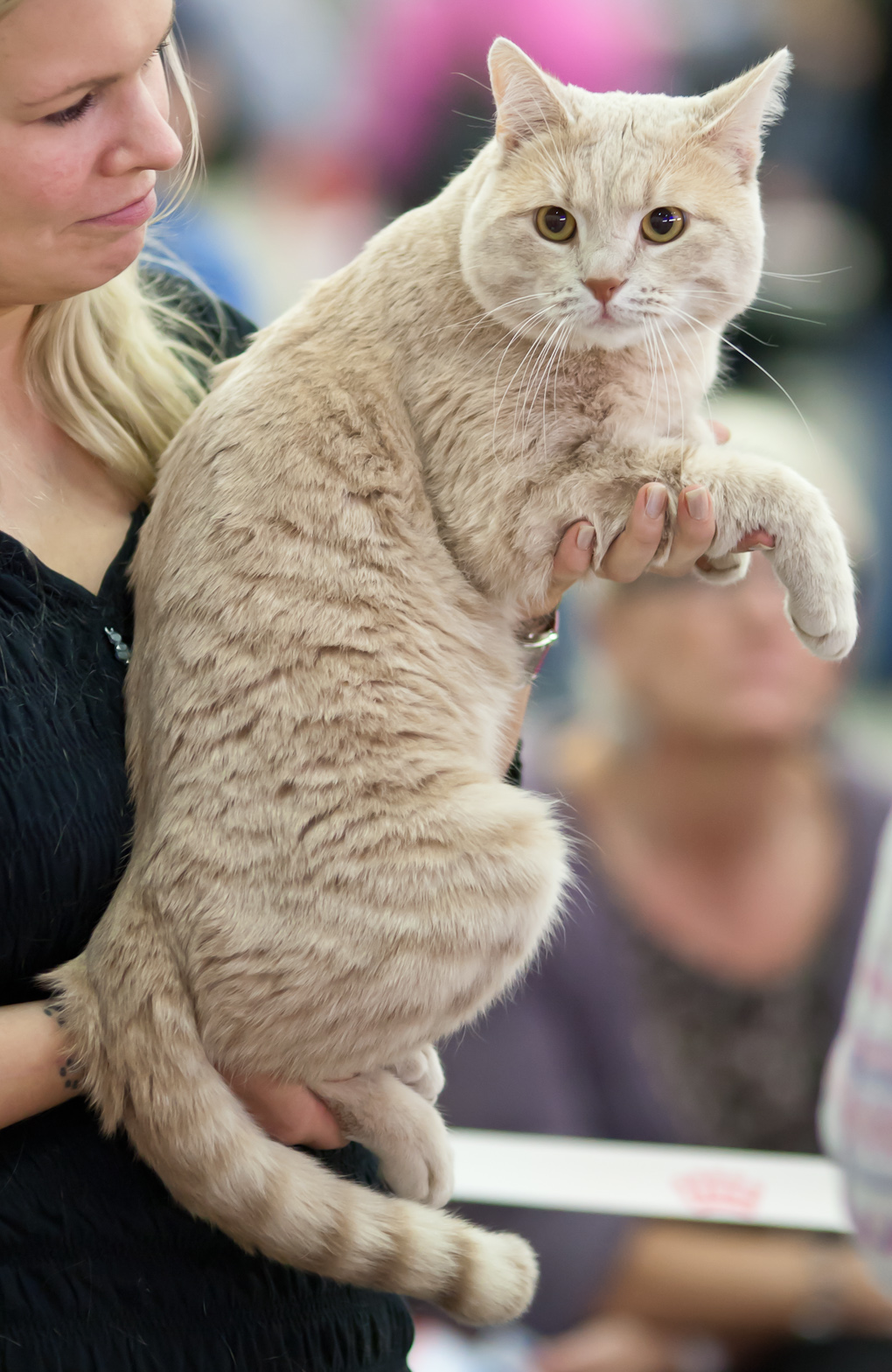
The European Shorthair at the 2011 TUROK Cat Show in Turku, Finland, wondering the purpose of its presence there.

In Europe, many times the cats are judged in a so-called traditional style. Traditional judging is often combined with ring style judging, so a cat show may consist of several rings plus traditional judging. With traditional judging, each cat is assigned to a judge, who gives a written report to the owner. Each judge may nominate a cat to the final judging, when all judges examine the finalists, and the final rewards are given by voting of the judges.

The Supreme Cat Show is held each October at the National Exhibition Centre, Birmingham, England.

== United States ==
The first cat show in the United States took place in Madison Square Garden, New York City in 1895.

In the US, each judge has a separate ring with cages. The cats are brought up to the judge, who removes each cat in turn and then replaces them when they are done. Spectators, including the owners of the cats, are present and in the audience. The cats' owners are given a number for each cat and are responsible for getting them to the ring when they are called.

=== CFA cat shows and titles ===
The US Cat Fanciers' Association (CFA) is the world's largest registry of pedigreed cats and the predominant pedigreed cat registering association in North America. While no two shows are identical, CFA cat shows follow certain procedures and guidelines:

A CFA cat show actually consists of a number of simultaneous cat shows running at the same time within the same place. Depending on the size of the show, there are anywhere from 4 to 12 "rings" (or miniature shows) which generally run one to two days in length. Each "ring" has its own judge who independently scores cats and awards the top 10 places (or top 15 depending on the size of the show).

Rings are of two kinds:

- "All Breed" rings allow cats of every breed approved by the CFA to be judged.
- "Specialty" rings separate cats into one of two types: "Long Hair" category include cats like Persians, Maine Coons, and other long-haired cats. "Short Hair" include Burmese, Sphynx, American Short Hair and other short-haired cats.

Points are awarded to cats based multiple of their placement within each ring combined with the number of cats that the cat has "beaten" in the ring.

- At the end of each show season, the top 25 cats in the country with the most points for the show season are awarded the coveted title of "National Winner" (NW).
- Cats in the top 25 of their "region" (usually several states) are awarded the prestigious title of "Regional Winner".
- Adult cats which are not neutered and achieve a point ranking of over 200 points are awarded the title of "Grand Champion".
- Neutered cats can be shown in a class called "Premier" and achieve the title of "Grand Premier" once they have achieved a point ranking of over 75 points.
- Cats which meet the standards of the breed as confirmed by six judges at one show are awarded "winners ribbon" by each judge and are awarded the lowest title of "Champion" or "Premier".
- Kittens from the age of 4 to 8 months compete in a separate "Kitten" class, and are also able to achieve the title of "National Winner" and "Regional Winner", but can not become Grand Champions or Grand Premiers until reaching adulthood at 8 months of age.
- Adult cats being shown at a show with no existing title are referred to as "Open".

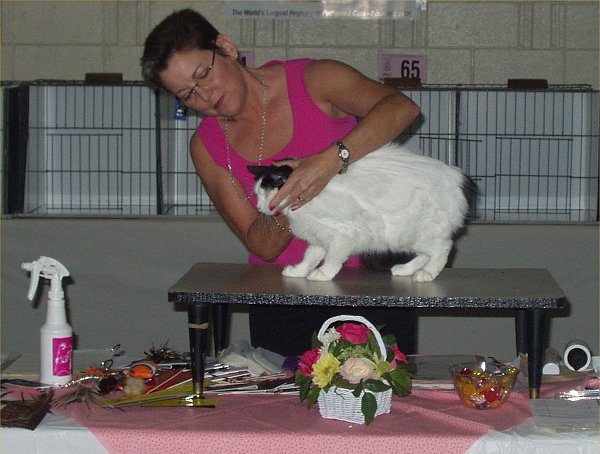
Judge handling a cat at a cat show

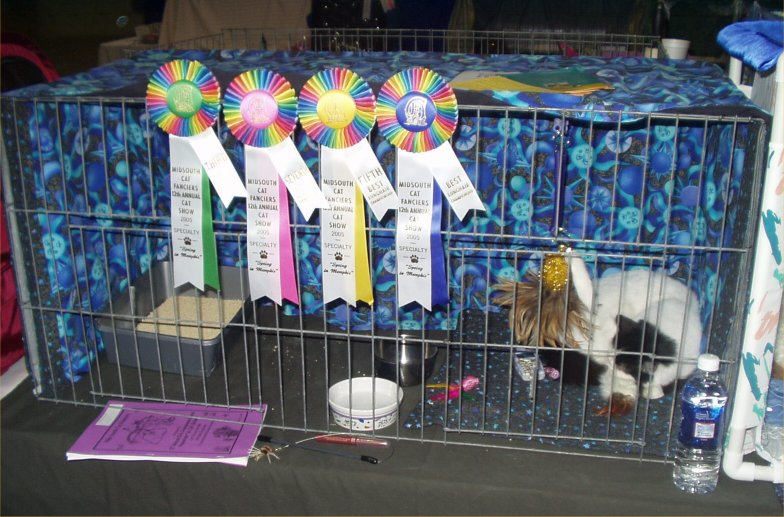
Typical cat show benching cage in the US. Cats wait here until their owners are called to enter them into the ring.

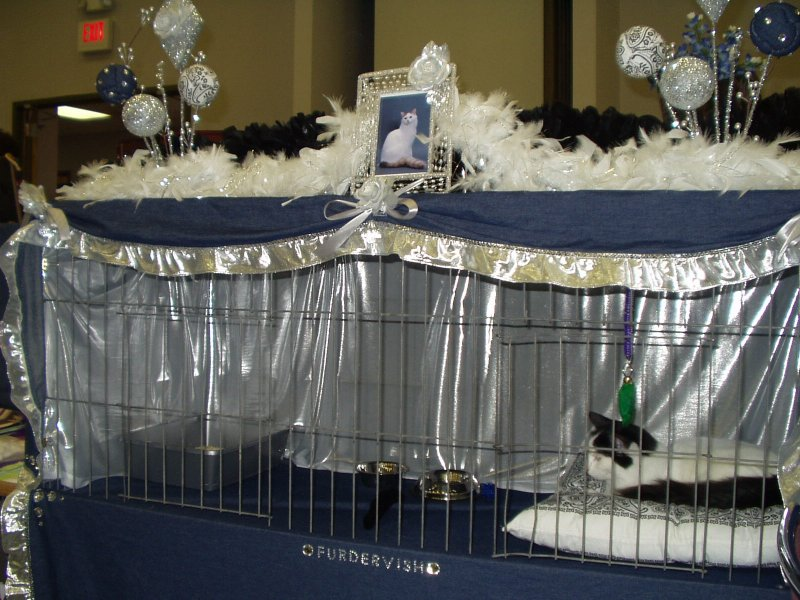
Fancy cat show benching area decorations

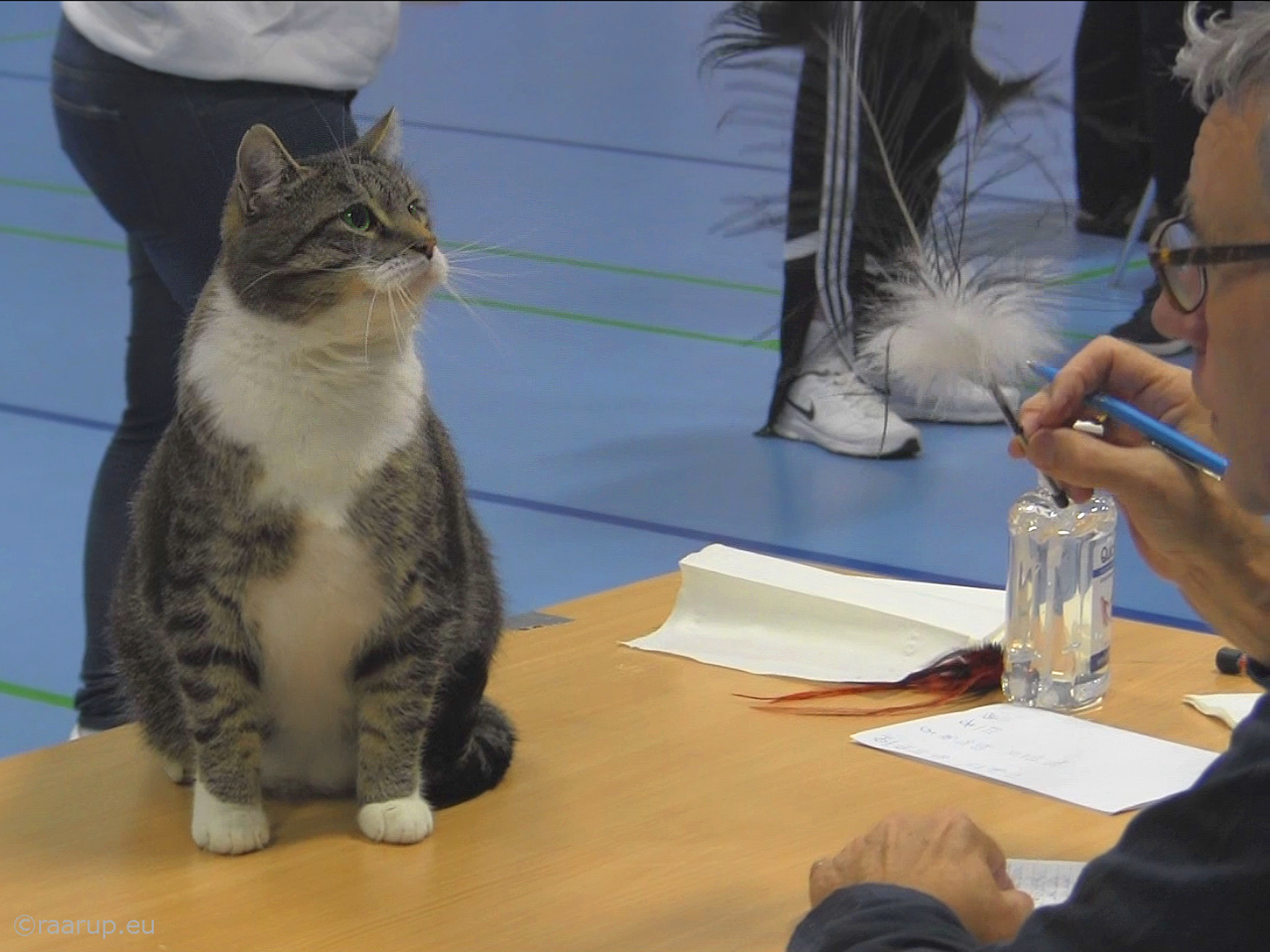
Non-pedigree cats like this domestic short-haired can also compete and win at cat shows.

== See also ==
- Cat registry
- Felinology
- List of individual cats
- Show cat
- Show Cats: The Standard of Perfection, a documentary about cat shows and show cats.
- Supreme Cat Show
- Harrison Weir - Creator of the first cat show
