= Spit (2025 film) =

2025 Australian comedy film

- Directed by: Jonathan Teplitzky
- Written by: Chris Nyst
- Produced by: Trish Lake; Greg Duffy; Felicity McVay; David Wenham
- Starring: David Wenham; Helen Thomson; David Field; David Roberts; Gary Sweet; Arlo Green; Pallavi Sharda; Ayik Daniel Chut Deng; Sam Rybka; Tegan Rybka; Sami Afuni
- Cinematography: Garry Phillips
- Edited by: Nick Meyers
- Music by: Elliott Wheeler
- Production companies: Screen Australia; Screen Queensland; Tracking Films; Freshwater Pictures
- Distributed by: Transmission Films
- Release date: 6 March 2025
- Running time: 105 minutes
- Country: Australia
- Language: English
- Box office: US$760,485

Spit is a 2025 Australian comedy film directed by Jonathan Teplitzky and written by Chris Nyst. It is a spin-off of the 2003 film Gettin' Square.

== Cast ==
- David Wenham as Johnny "Spit" Spitieri
- Helen Thomson as Marion Barrington
- David Field as Arne Deviers
- David Roberts as Niall Toole
- Gary Sweet as Charles 'Chicka' Martin
- Arlo Green as Jihad Kalif
- Pallavi Sharda as Aria Sahni
- Ayik Daniel Chut Deng as Baktash
- Sam Rybka as Annie Barrington
- Maude Davey as Jane Holland
- Sami Afuni as Hayyan

== Production ==
The film was announced on 19 December 2023 with David Wenham reprising his role as Johnny "Spit" Spitieri, and Transmission Films distributing in Australia and New Zealand.

Principal photography began on 4 April 2024 on the Gold Coast in Queensland and ended in May.

== Reception ==
The film received positive reviews from critics.

Luke Buckmaster of The Guardian wrote in his review, "The film-makers insist a little too much that he’s a fundamentally decent person. Spit still feels like a real character, however, largely thanks to Wenham’s superb performance." Anthony Morris of ScreenHub said in his review, "Wenham is clearly having a lot of fun and his performance as the new kinder, gentler Spit is often surprisingly warm and heartfelt. Sanding off his rough edges does come with some drawbacks though, and a mellower Spit is a less obviously amusing Spit."
