= Moggy =

Informal name for a non-pedigree cat

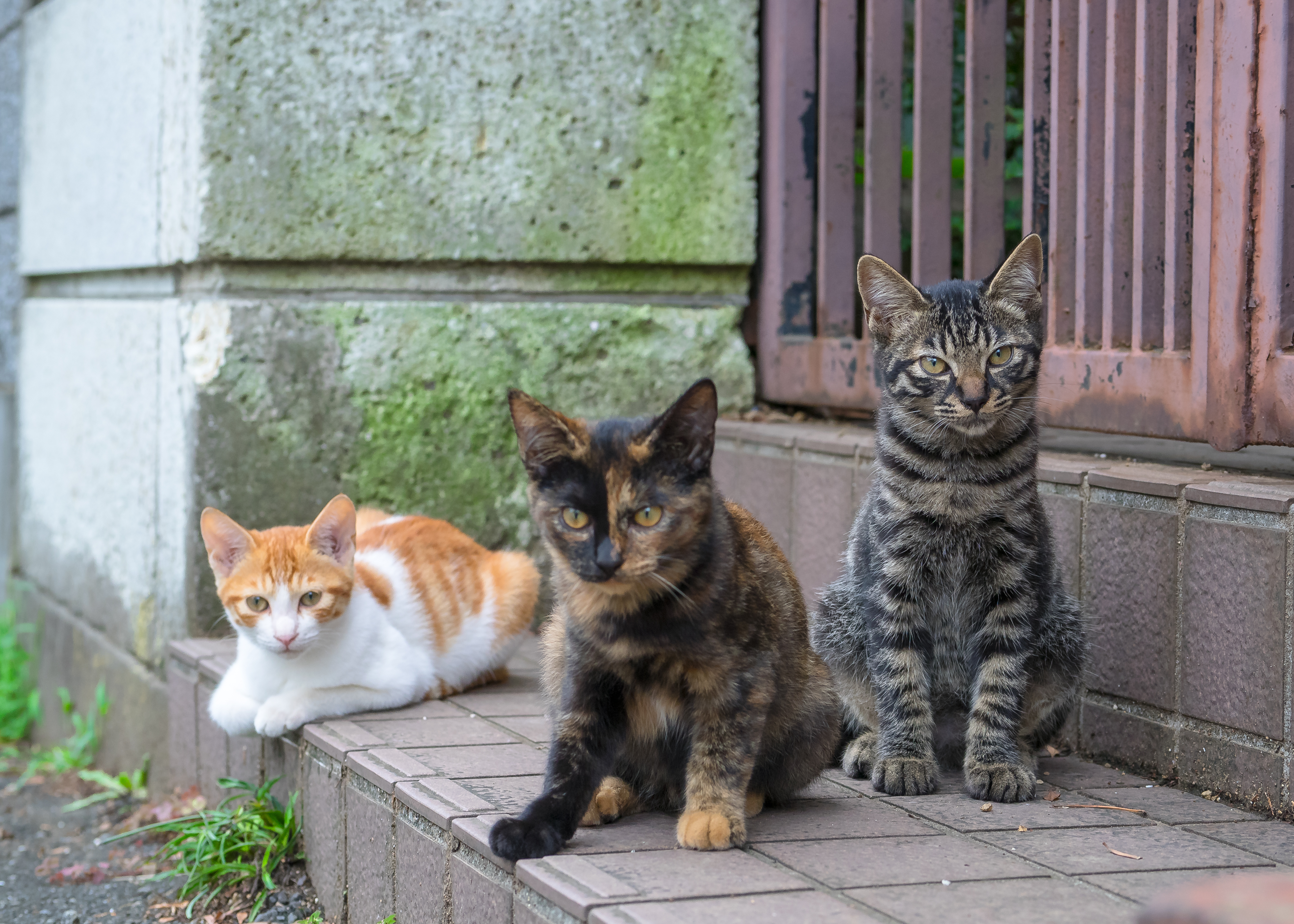
Three moggies displaying different coats

A moggy is any cat which has not been intentionally bred. Moggies lack a consistent appearance unlike purebred cats that are selectively bred for appearance conforming to a standard. In contexts where cats need to be registered—such as in veterinary practices or shelters—moggies may be called domestic short-haired (DSH) or domestic long-haired (DLH) cats, depending on coat length (and less common designations may include "domestic medium-haired (DMH)" or "domestic semi-long-haired"). (Note: When used in the formal name of standardised breeds, these terms are often (depending on registry) compressed into forms like "shorthair", "longhair", "semi-longhair", even "semilonghair", though these are not actual words in standard English. Consequently, the spelling may vary, e.g. "domestic shorthair" and "domestic longhair", despite these not being actual breed names. The term moggy is also primarily a British English usage, though spreading; alternative terms like "domestic short[-]hair[ed]" are in more frequent use outside the UK.) The vast majority of cats worldwide lack any pedigree ancestry.

== History ==
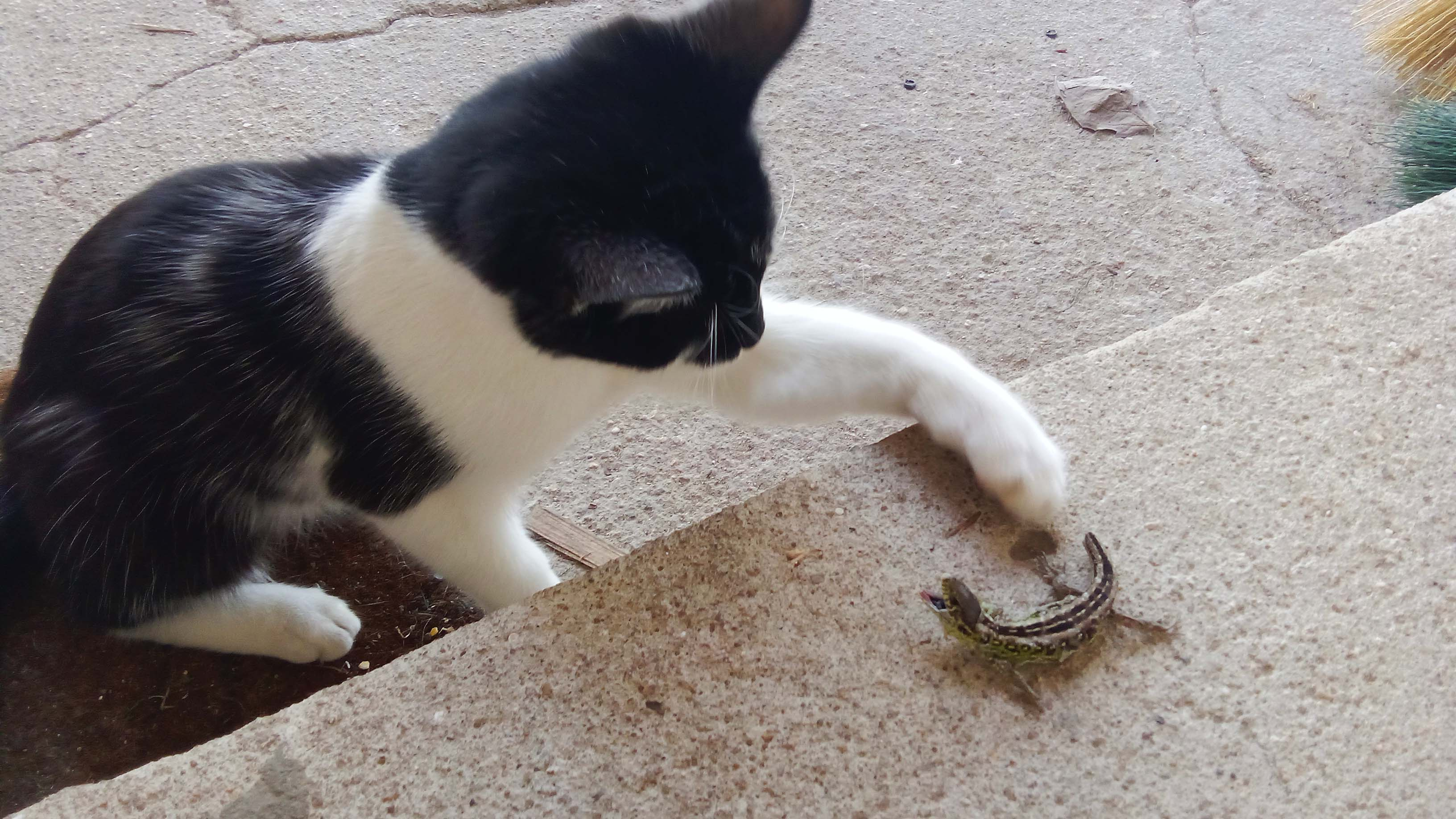
A bicolour moggy toying with a lizard

Out of the hundreds of millions of cats worldwide, almost none have any purebred ancestors, nor belong to a specific breed, because purebred cats are a human invention of the last 150 years and selectively bred from foundation stock by the cat fancy in closed-off registered lineages. Over 85% of cat breeds have come into existence since the 1930s.

By definition all cats belonging to a specific breed are pedigreed cats with a known and formally registered ancestry with one of the cat registries, also known as the cat's “paperwork” or pedigree.

=== Demography ===
According to the government of the United States, fewer than 2% of cats in that country are purebred and raised by breeders. Not all breeders sell registered pedigree cats. Domestic short-haired cats make up 95% of their cat population according to the US American Humane Association. In France, this number is higher and approximately 4% of cats are pedigreed. (Note: All purebred cats born in France after 1999 should be registered with LOOF. LOOF registry data from 2003-2022 is publicly available and shows that 646774 cats were registered in that time period. In 2022, France had a cat population of 14.9 million according to Statista. Discarding the import and export of French purebred cats and cats born before 2003 (due to lack of data), this means 646774 out of 14.9 million or 4.3% of the French cats is registered/pedigreed. As most cat registries do not have their data public, are an international registry, or not forced by national laws, this is one of the few sources that gives a valid indication of cat registry numbers. Most self-reported data on cat breeds is influenced by the fact that rescues/owners label for example all solid blue cats as Russian Blue cats.) In the UK 89–92% of cats are of non-pedigree lineage. Worldwide the number of unpedigreed moggies is somewhat higher, and is estimated at 98–99%. (Note: Based on the less than 2% of cats in the USA, the approximately 4% of the registered pedigreed cats in France, and the popularity of pedigreed cats in France compared to all other countries worldwide. The cat fancy is well established in France since the end of the 19th-century. The popularity of pedigree cats in France is also seen in the number of different breeds registered with LOOF, and the numbers of France born and living pedigree cats compared to other countries in the PawPeds-database.)

== Domestic short-haired ==
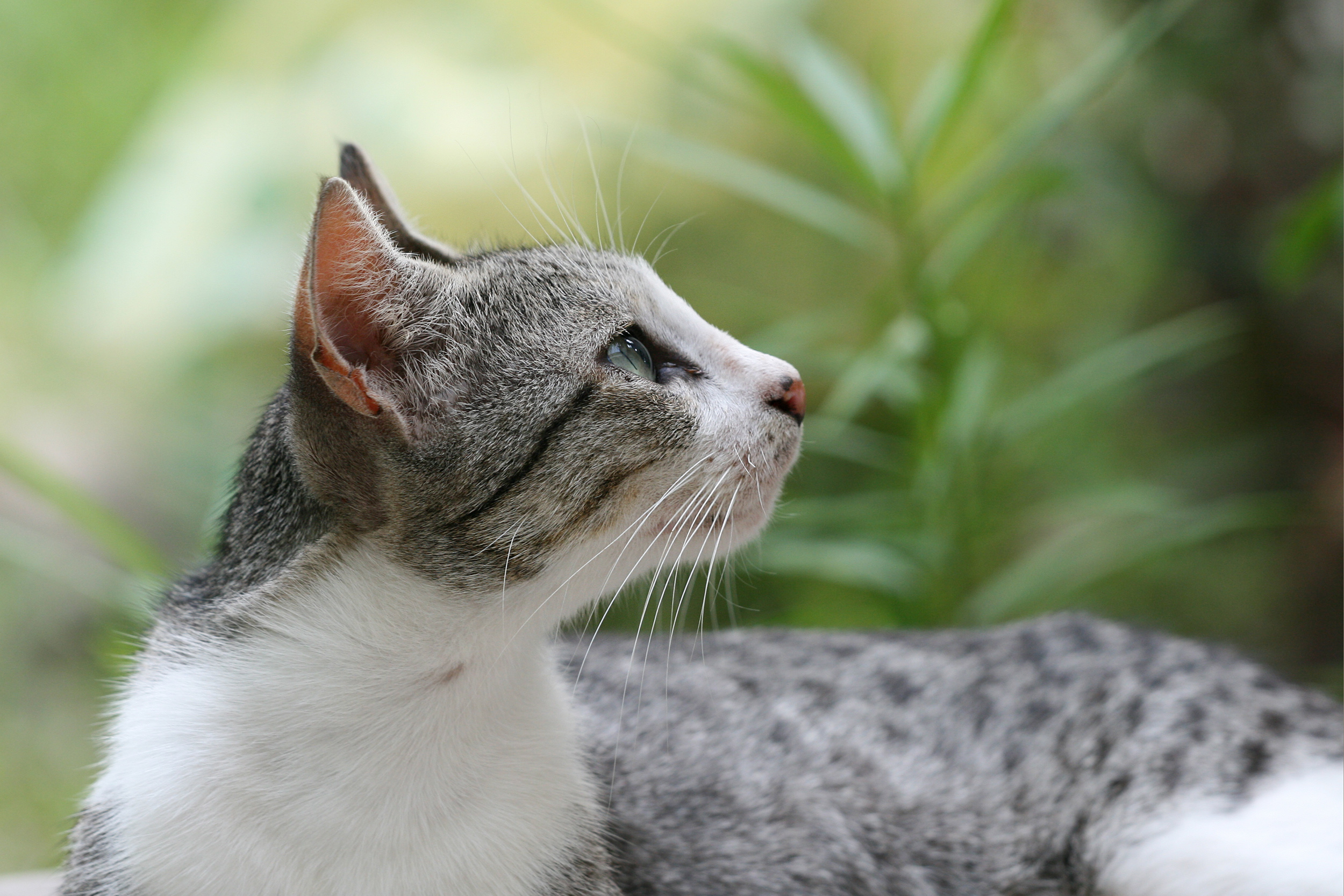
A domestic shorthair cat

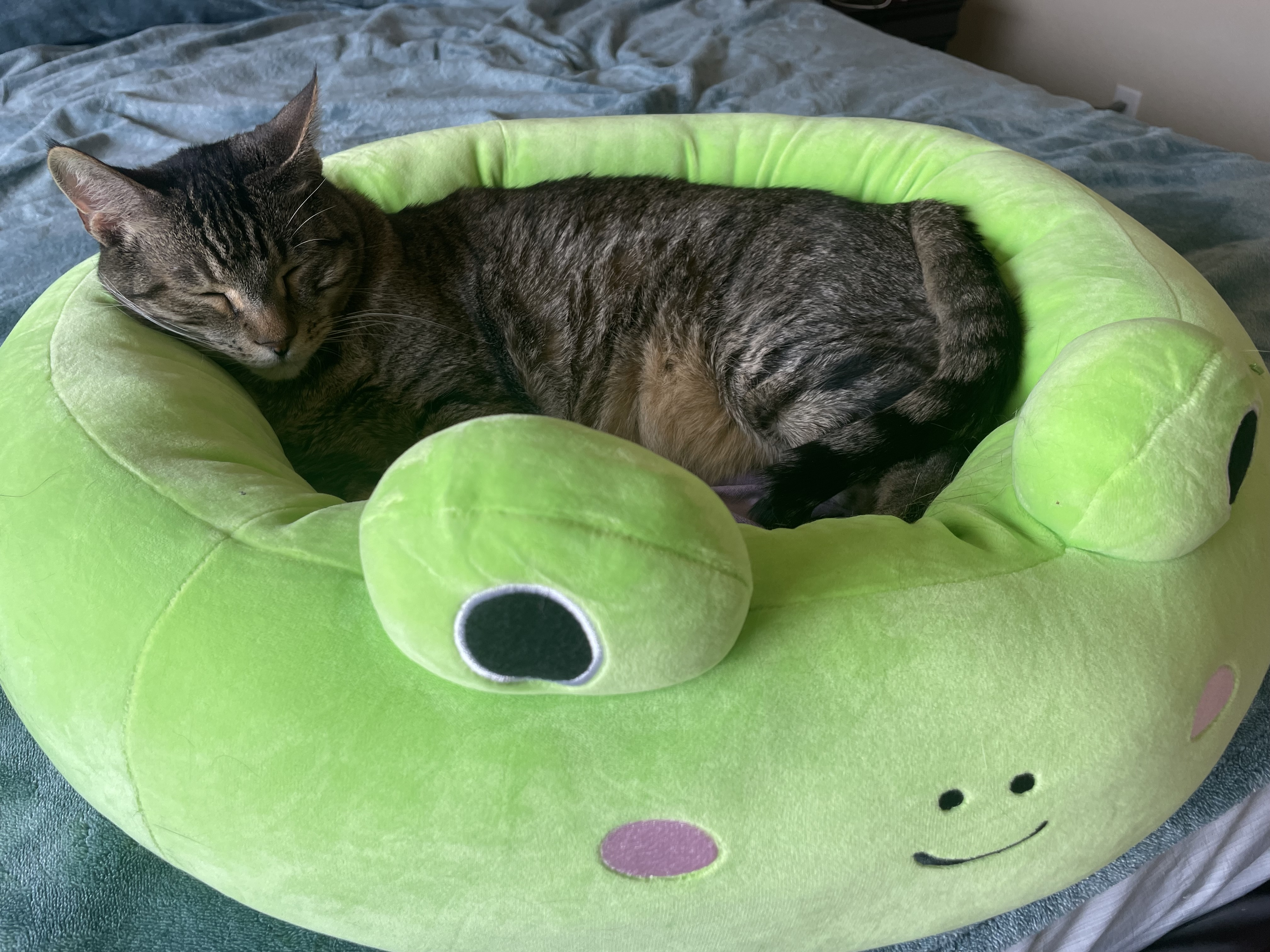
A sleeping domestic shorthair cat

In the cat fancy, and among veterinarians and animal control agencies, domestic short-haired cats may be classified with organization-specific terminology (often capitalized), such as: "Domestic Shorthair" (DSH); "House Cat, Shorthair" (HCS); or "Shorthair Household Pet".

Such a pseudo-breed is used for registry as well as shelter/rescue classification purposes. While not bred as show cats, some domestic short-haired cats are actually pedigreed (have a recorded genealogy) and are entered into cat shows that have non-purebred "Household Pet" divisions. Show rules vary; the Fédération Internationale Féline (FIFe) permits "any eye colour, all coat colours and patterns, any coat length or texture, and any length of tail" (basically, any cat). Others may be more restrictive; an example from the World Cat Federation: "All classic colours are permitted. Any amount of white is permitted. The colours chocolate and cinnamon, as well as their dilution (lilac and fawn) are not recognized in any combinations (bicolour, tricolour, tabby). The pointed pattern is also not recognized."

Domestic short-haired cats are characterised by a wide range of colouring, and typically "revert to type" after a few generations, which means they express their coats as a natural tabby pattern. This can be any colour or combination of colours. They also exhibit a wide range of physical characteristics; domestic short-haired cats in different countries tend to look different in body shape and size, as they developed from differing gene pools. DSH cats in Asia tend to have a build similar to a "classic" Siamese or Tonkinese, while European and American varieties have a thicker, heavier build.

== Domestic long-haired ==
A domestic long-haired cat is a cat of mixed ancestry – thus not belonging to any particular recognised cat breed – possessing a coat of semi-long to long fur. Domestic long-haired cats should not be confused with the British Longhair, American Longhair, or other breeds with "Longhair" names, which are standardised breeds defined by various registries. Other generic terms are in British English, moggie and in American English alley cat. Domestic long-haired cats are the third most common type of cat in the United States.

In the cat fancy, and among veterinarians and animal control agencies, domestic long-haired cats may be classified with organisation-specific terminology (often capitalised), such as "Domestic Longhair" (DLH); "House Cat, Longhair" (HCL); or "Semi-Longhair Household Pet". Such a pseudo-breed is used for registry and shelter/rescue classification purposes, and breeds such as the Persian cat. While not bred as show cats, some mixed-breed cats are actually pedigreed and entered into cat shows that have non-purebred "Household Pet" divisions. Show rules vary; the Fédération Internationale Féline permits "any eye colour, all coat colours and patterns, any coat length or texture, and any length of tail" (basically any healthy cat). Others may be more restrictive; an example from the World Cat Federation: "The colours chocolate and cinnamon, as well as their dilution (lilac and fawn) are not recognized in any combinations ...[and] the pointed pattern is also not recognized".

Domestic long-haireds come in all genetically possible cat colours including tabby, tortoiseshell, bicolour cat, and smoke. Domestic long-haireds can have fur that is up to six inches long. They can also have a mane similar to a Maine Coon's, as well as toe tufts and ear tufts. Some long-haired cats are not able to maintain their own coat, which must be frequently groomed by a human or may be prone to matting. Because of their wide gene pool, domestic long-haireds are not predisposed to any genetically inherited problems.

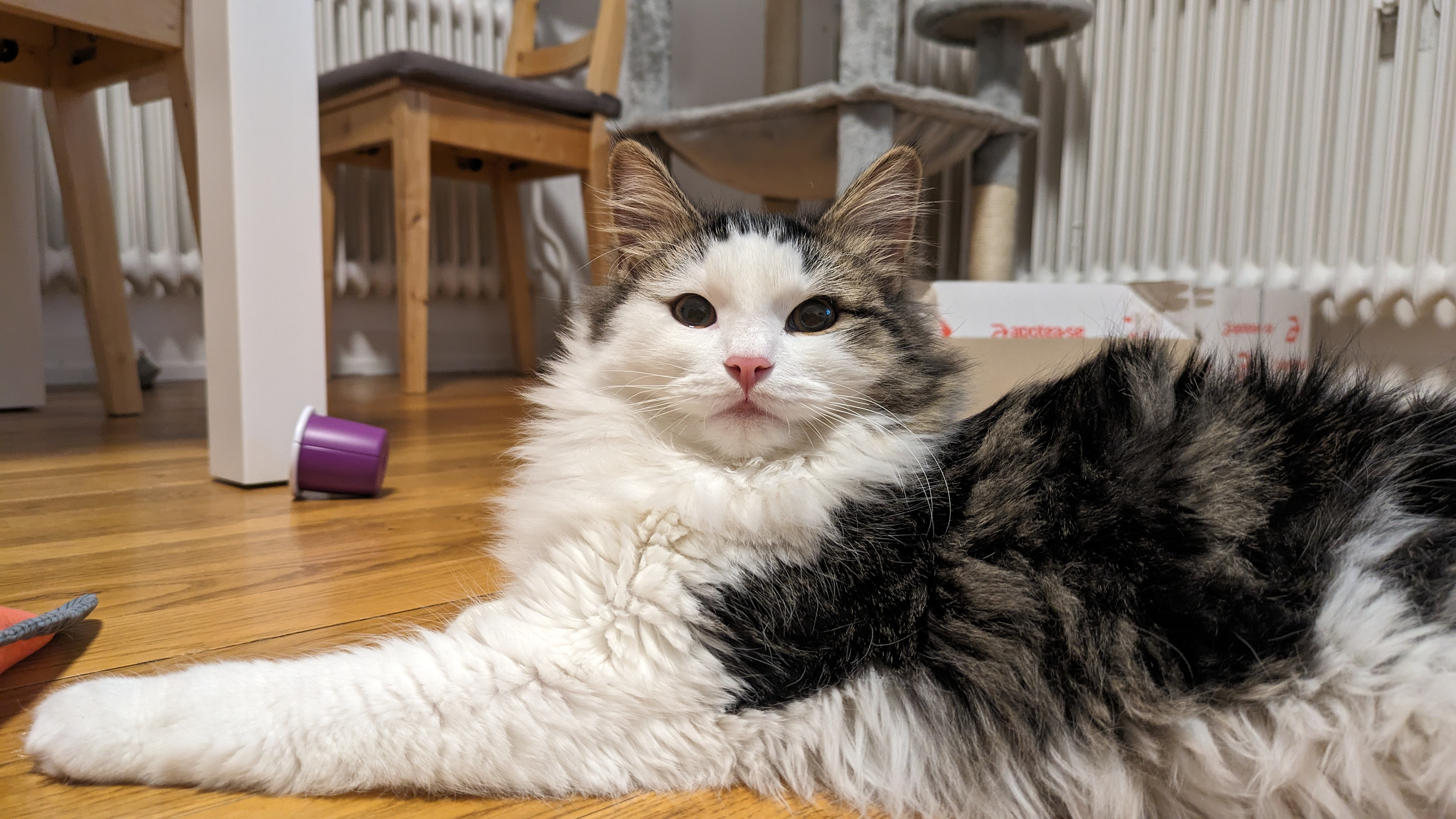
A domestic long-haired tabby and white bicolour cat

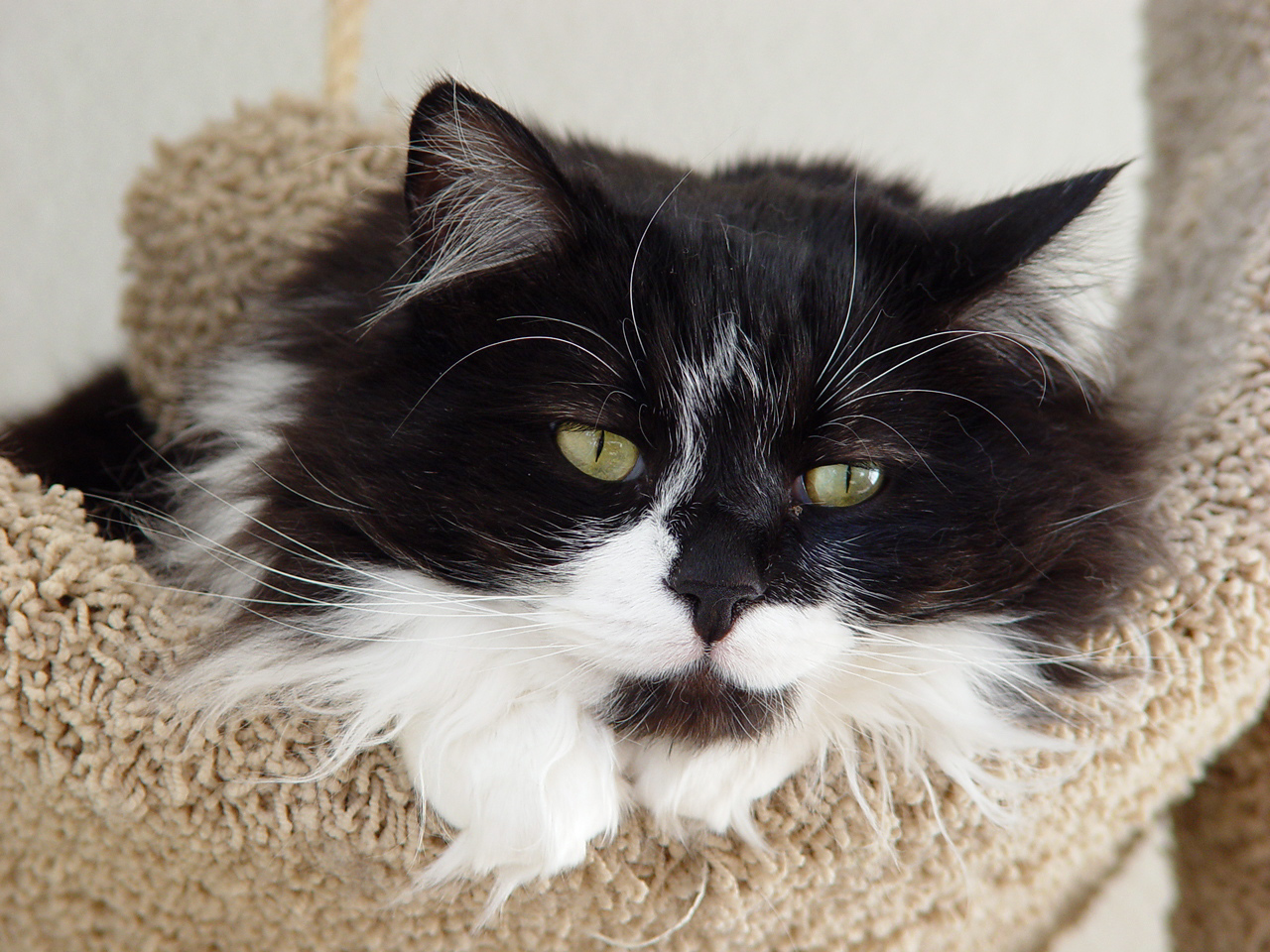
This domestic long-haired cat appears to be of partial Persian ancestry, with a relatively flat nose and fine hair.

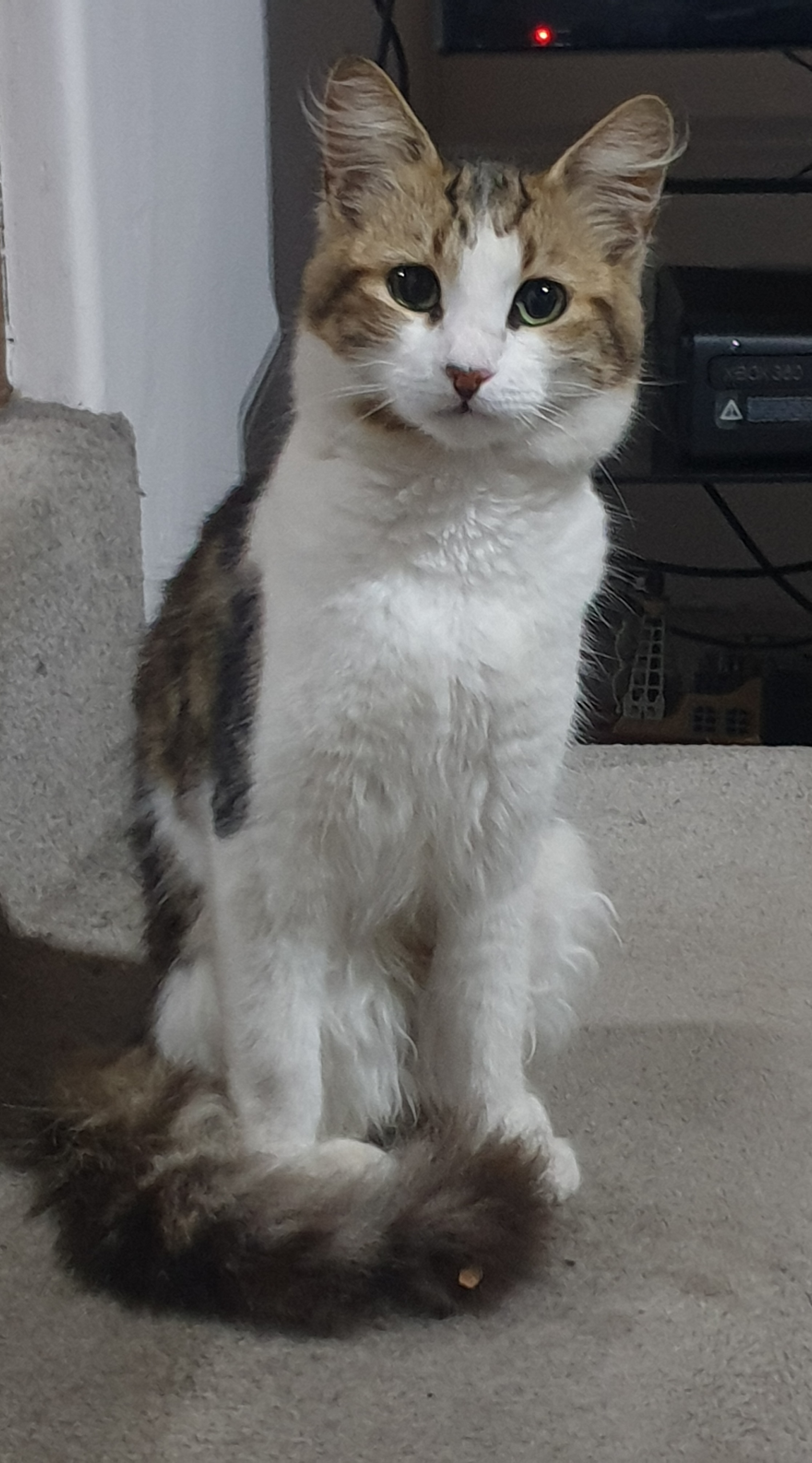
Semi Longhaired Ginger, Black and White Torbie

=== History ===
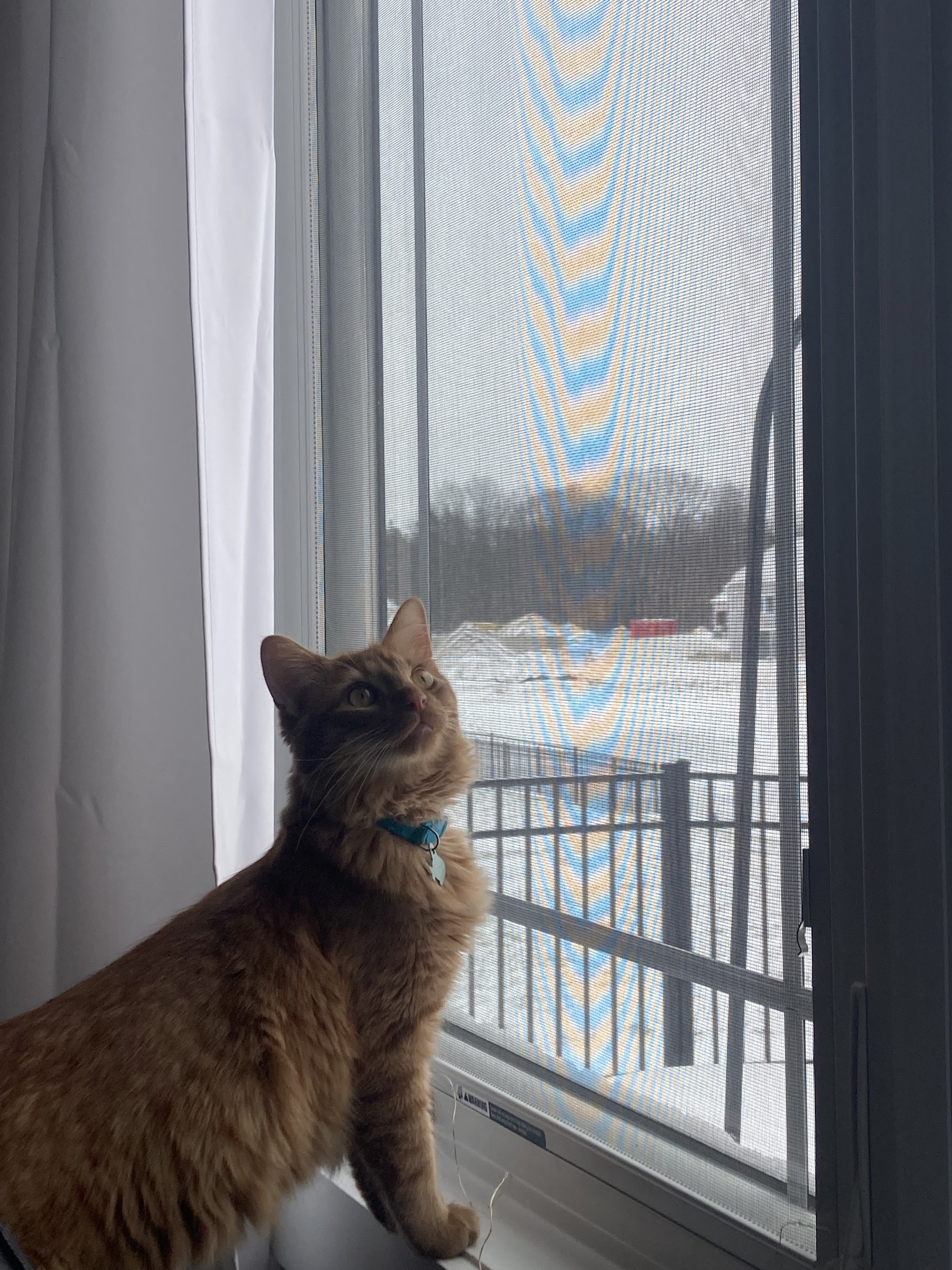
A red tabby cat domestic long-hair and Maine Coon mix at seven months

Having apparently originated in Western Asia, domestic long-haired cats have been kept as pets around the world for several centuries. During the 16th century, the first long-haired cats were imported into Europe. In the mid-17th century, when the Great Plague of London decimated much of London's human population, the number of cats started to recover after centuries of persecution, as they were encouraged as protectors from flea-carrying rats.

How the variant developed is still a matter of speculation. The long coat may have been the result of a recessive mutant gene. When a long-haired cat is mated to one with a short coat, only short-haired kittens can result; however, their offspring, when mated, can produce a proportion of long-coated kittens. Successive litters of early European long-haired cats produced more and more long-coated offspring, which were more likely to survive in the cooler European climates. By the year 1521, around the time they were first documented in Italy, the variety had become fixed after only a few generations.

In the late 18th century, Peter Simon Pallas advanced the hypothesis that the manul (also known as Pallas's cat) might be the ancestor of the long-haired domestic cat. He had anecdotal evidence that established, even though the male offspring would be sterile hybrids, the female offspring could again reproduce with domestic cats and pass on a small proportion of the manul's genes. In 1907, zoologist Reginald Innes Pocock refuted this claim, citing his work on the skull differences between the manul and the Angoras or Persians of his time. This early hypothesis overlooked the potential for crossbreeding within the family Felidae. For example, the Savannah cat is a crossbreed between a domestic short-haired cat and a wild serval—both of which have different skulls and evolutionary lineage. Furthermore, hybrid females in the related genus Panthera, such as ligers and tigons, have successfully mated, producing tiligers and litigons.

The first modern, formal breeds of long-haired cats were the Persian and the Angora (named after Ankara, Turkey) and were said to have come from those two areas.

== Health ==
A study of veterinary records in the United Kingdom found that moggies lived significantly longer than pedigreed cats. A Japanese study of insurance records found all disease categories except dental disease and injuries to be more prevalent in purebreds than moggies.

== See also ==
- Mongrel or mutt
