= Out There (2003 TV series) =

2003 TV series

- Created by: Willie Reale
- Directed by: Julie Money
- Starring: Douglas Smith; Cody Kasch; Genevieve Hegney; David Roberts; Jade Ewen; Richard Wilson; Molly McCaffrey
- Opening theme: "Doin' What I Do"
- Countries of origin: United States; Australia
- No. of seasons: 2
- No. of episodes: 26

Production
- Executive producers: Essie Chambers; Claire Henderson; Liz Nealon
- Producers: Michael Bourchier; Kurt Mueller
- Camera setup: Multi-camera
- Running time: 24 minutes
- Production companies: Blink Films; Sesame Workshop; British Broadcasting Corporation; Australian Broadcasting Corporation; The N Original Productions

Original release
- Network: Noggin (The N) (United States); ABC-TV (Australia)
- Release: May 23 – July 3, 2003

Out There is a teen drama television series produced by Sesame Workshop and Noggin LLC for the Noggin channel's nighttime programming block, The N. When the show started development, Sesame Workshop co-owned Noggin, and Out There was launched as a tween-oriented project for the network. The show was written, produced, and commissioned in New York, and it originated as an entirely American series with a storyline set in New York. During development, it became an American-Australian co-production (then titled Two Down Under), and filming took place mostly in Australia.

The show's plot mirrors its co-development between the United States and Australia. It follows the trials and tribulations of an American high school boy named Reilly (Douglas Smith), who moves to Australia from Connecticut as his father flees the authorities. He stays with his aunt and uncle, who are the owners of a nature reserve and veterinary clinic. Reilly befriends his co-worker Aggie (Jade Ewen), a local boy named Miller (Richard Wilson), and the girl next door, Fiona (Molly McCaffrey).

The series premiered on Noggin on May 23, 2003, as the inaugural show of a scheduling event called "Summer in The N." The first four episodes were shown as a two-hour series premiere, and the remainder of the first season aired on Fridays at 9 p.m. in June and July 2003. The show ran for two seasons and 26 episodes in total. It aired its final new episode on July 1, 2004, with reruns continuing throughout the year.

== Production ==
The show's concept was developed by Sesame Workshop and Noggin, both headquartered in New York. The show's plot started out as a "purely North American concept set in New York," without any Australian elements. It began production when the Noggin channel was co-owned and jointly operated by Nickelodeon and Sesame Workshop.

When the show was pitched to potential broadcasters overseas, two buyers—the ABC in Australia and the BBC in Britain—wanted to see the story regionalized so that it would appeal to viewers in their respective regions. The crew "went back to the drawing board" and revised the concept, turning the main character Reilly from an average American into an American displaced in Australia. The character of Aggie was added to hold appeal to British audiences. Both the ABC and the BBC provided funding for the show.

The show was first announced under the working title Two Down Under, which refers to two outsiders moving "down under" to Australia. The show aired as part of The N, a nighttime block on the Noggin channel for tween and teen-oriented shows. The show was specifically aimed at 9- to 13-year-olds, and it was marketed as a "tween drama."

According to executive producer Claire Henderson, accurately representing the American and British characters was easy, while faithfully depicting Australia was more difficult. She said, "Now this actually naturally worked with Reilly being the American and Aggie coming over from Britain. But you have to make sure also that Australia is represented as something that Australian kids can relate to and not some sort of false identity that might suit the other partners."

== Synopsis ==
In the series, Reilly moves from Greenwich, Connecticut to work with his aunt and uncle, Ellen (Genevieve Hegney) and Jonathan (David Roberts) in Australia. He is joined at the clinic by a girl named Aggie Thackery (Jade Ewen), an intern from England. She is initially annoyed at his stubborn demeanor, but grows to like him. Reilly also makes friends with an eccentric local boy, Miller McKee (Richard Wilson), and the girl next door, Fiona McDaniels (Molly McCaffrey), who both work at the clinic. In the first season, Miller is repeatedly turned down by Aggie, who does not yet return his strong feelings for her.

In the second season, Reilly returns to America and is not seen for the remainder of the series. A supposed intern from Texas named Tom (Cody Kasch) arrives, hoping for a "new start," only to be discovered as a fraud and almost sent back to America. This season also adds three new supporting characters: the captain of Aggie's Netball team, Alice (Ashleigh Murray), who has secret affections for Miller, Gregor Krauss (Sean Kennedy), Aggie's short-lived love interest, and Miller's newfound stray dog, Hendrix.

== Cast ==
=== Main ===
- Douglas Smith – Reilly Evans (season 1)
- Cody Kasch – Tom Butler (season 2)
- Genevieve Hegney – Ellen Archer
- David Roberts – Jonathan Archer
- Jade Ewen – Aggie Thackery
- Richard Wilson – Miller McKee
- Molly McCaffrey – Fiona McDaniel

=== Recurring ===
- Rebecca Jones – Sam McKee
- Ashleigh Murray – Alice O'Connor
- Sean Kennedy – Gregor Krauss
- Oliver Ackland – Peter Logan
- Mark Lee

=== Guests ===
- Belinda Giblin
- Lewis Fitz-Gerald
- Tina Bursill

== Episodes ==
=== Season 1 ===
- Episode #1: "Two Down Under"
- Episode #2: "Summer in December"
- Episode #3: "The Hard Way"
- Episode #4: "Homesick Blues"
- Episode #5: "One Hot Dog to Go"
- Episode #6: "Connections: Missed and Made"
- Episode #7: "Don't Look Back"
- Episode #8: "Peggy"
- Episode #9: "Some Wombats Have all the Luck"
- Episode #10: "Smoke Gets in Your Eyes"
- Episode #11: "Fairy Floss"
- Episode #12: "Reilly Had a Little Goat"
- Episode #13: "Tadpole"

=== Season 2 ===
- Episode #1: "Arrivals And Departures"
- Episode #2: "Dodger"
- Episode #3: "Powerful Choice"
- Episode #4: "This Just In"
- Episode #5: "Human Nature"
- Episode #6: "Crime and Punishment"
- Episode #7: "School of Hard Knocks"
- Episode #8: "Home Away from Home"
- Episode #9: "Search Party"
- Episode #10: "Horses Eat Us"
- Episode #11: "To Know Me Is"
- Episode #12: "Glimpses"
- Episode #13: "The Longest Day"

== Soundtracks ==
- Ted Leo - Parallel
- The Snitches - Right Before my Eyes
- Lucksmitches - Self Preservation
- Slumber Party - Bag of Spiders
- The Snitches - In My Hard
- Even - Shining Star
- Spoon - Take a Walk
- Exploding white Mice - Blaze of Glory
- Citizen Bird - People Get Real
- Action Slacks - Joan of Arc
- Marah - Soul
- Groove Terminator - What's Your Name
- Sarah Dougher - Ground Belows
- Fuzz Townsend - C'mon C'mon
- Go Betweens - Going Blind
- Groove Ghouties - An Unsolved Mystery
- Freddy Fresh - Used To Be Bad
- Mascott - Weight Of The World
- Fastbacks - We Can Be
- Enon - Old Dominion
- The Clean - Stars
- OlympicLifts - Vertical Herizontally
- The Incredible Moses - Leroy Anthem
- French Fries - Sing About Me
- Cato Salsa Experience - Lucky Girl
- Cato Salsa Experience - So the Circus is Back
- A Girl Called Eddy - Soundtrack of your Life
- Livesavas - Me
- The Agenda - Crash! Crash!
- The Ataris - IOU One Galaxy
- Tammy Keens - Begin Where We End
- Enon - Pleasure and Privilege
- Enon - Carbonation
- The Pattern - Nothing of value
- Dr. Kosmos - Career Opportunities
- OlympicLifts - Olympiclifts
- Stella One Eleven - Go Slow Girl
- Tender Trap - Love is Red / Green

== Awards ==
The series was nominated for several Australian Film Institute (AFI) Awards. Director Stephen Maxwell Johnson's direction of the episode "Reilly Had A Little Goat" was nominated for Best Direction in 2003, and the series was nominated for Best Children's Television Drama in both 2003 and 2004, and won in 2003. It was nominated for a Logie Award in the Most Outstanding Children's Program category in 2004 and 2005, winning in 2005. A script for one of the episodes was nominated for a Writers Guild of America award in 2004.
