= Dying to Live (2018 film) =

2018 Australian documentary

- Theatrical release poster
- Directed by: Richard Todd
- Written by: Sarah Rossetti
- Produced by: Richard Todd, Ben McNeill
- Starring: Allan Turner, Kate Hansen, Holly Ralph, Peter Wood, Tony Beret, Alice Turner, Henry Archoo
- Cinematography: Richard Todd, Richard Kickbush
- Edited by: Lawrie Silvestrin
- Music by: Ash Gibson-Greig
- Production companies: Aquarius Productions, Intrinsic Story
- Distributed by: Madman Entertainment
- Release date: 8 June 2018 (Sydney Film Festival)
- Running time: 95 minutes
- Country: Australia
- Language: English language

Dying to Live (2018) is an Australian feature-length documentary film directed by Richard Todd. It reveals how Australia lags behind similar countries in organ and tissue donor registration numbers, and features Australian organ and tissue donors and recipients from Victoria, Western Australia and Queensland.

== Production ==
The film was produced by Richard Todd of Aquarius Productions and Ben McNeill of Intrinsic Story, and was directed by Todd.

Aquarius Productions and Intrinsic Story commenced production on Dying to Live in late 2015. The film was shot in Western Australia, Queensland and Victoria. According to director Richard Todd, he "first heard about the organ and tissue shortage in Australia on a TV breakfast show in 2015 featuring a story with Allan Turner". Allan Turner is the father of Zaidee, a 7-year-old girl who suffered a brain aneurism and subsequently became Victoria’s youngest organ and tissue donor that year.

Time critical shoots occurred in late 2016 and filming was completed in December 2017. Editing was completed in March 2018.

== Release ==
Dying to Live premiered at the Sydney Film Festival in June 2018 and had local premieres at Melbourne International Film Festival, Brisbane International Film Festival and CinefestOz in Western Australia. The film was released in cinemas across Australia in October 2018.

== Reception ==
Dying to Live was shortlisted for a 2018 AACTA Award.
