= Gettin' Square =

2003 film by Jonathan Teplitzky

- Australian DVD cover
- Directed by: Jonathan Teplitzky
- Written by: Chris Nyst
- Produced by: Martin Fabinyi; Tim White; Trish Lake
- Starring: Sam Worthington; David Wenham; Timothy Spall; Freya Stafford; Gary Sweet; David Field; Mitchell Butel
- Cinematography: Garry Phillips
- Edited by: Ken Sallows
- Production companies: Mushroom Pictures; WTA; Freshwater Pictures; Squared Productions
- Distributed by: Hoyts Distribution (Australia)
- Release dates: 29 July 2003 (BIFF); 9 October 2003 (Australia)
- Running time: 100 minutes
- Countries: Australia; United Kingdom
- Language: English
- Budget: $7.9 million

Gettin' Square is a 2003 comedy crime thriller film directed by Jonathan Teplitzky and written by Chris Nyst. An international co-production between Australia and the United Kingdom, it stars Sam Worthington, David Wenham, Freya Stafford, Gary Sweet and Timothy Spall. It follows an ex-con who vows to go straight and make an honest man of himself, but finding a job is difficult with a criminal record.

The film had its world premiere at the 12th Brisbane International Film Festival on 29 July 2003, and was theatrically released in Australia on 9 October 2003. It received widespread critical acclaim, particularly for Wenham's performance, Teplitzky's direction and Nyst's screenplay. At the 45th Australian Film Institute Awards, Gettin' Square earned a leading fourteen nominations, including Best Film, and won two, including Wenham winning for Best Actor in a Leading Role.

A sequel to the film, named Spit, featuring Wenham's character Johnny Spitieri, was released in 2025.

== Plot ==
Barry Wirth is a retired small-time criminal who is released on parole following the death of his mother, so that he can care for his younger brother, Joey. Wirth was falsely convicted for murder by corrupt police detective Arnie DeViers, who is in the employ of criminal kingpin Chicka Martin. Shortly after Wirth is released, a corrupt accountant is arrested and his records seized, causing difficulties for Wirth's new employer, Darren "Dabba" Barrington, an ex criminal turned restaurateur whose money is seized along with that of Chicka. Wirth's friend Johnny "Spit" Spitieri, a heroin addict and small-time criminal, is arrested while conducting a drug deal and finds himself owing $20,000 to Chicka. DeViers continues to harass and threaten Wirth, even as the latter finds success as a chef in Dabba's restaurant. Despite his best efforts to remain clean, Wirth finds himself under increasing pressure to return to his criminal ways in order to help both Dabba and Spit.

== Cast ==
- Sam Worthington as Barry 'Wattsy' Wirth, a man recently paroled after serving time for a crime he did not commit
- David Wenham as Johnny Francis 'Spit' Spitieri, a small-time criminal and friend of Barry's
- Timothy Spall as Darren 'Dabba' Barrington
- Freya Stafford as Annie Flynn
- Gary Sweet as Chicka Martin
- David Roberts as Niall Toole
- David Field as Arnie DeViers
- Luke Pegler as Joey Wirth
- Richard Carter as Craig 'Crusher' Knobes
- Mitchell Butel as Con Katsakis
- Helen Thomson as Marion Barrington
- Steven Bishop as Gordon Frame 'Slippery Gordon'
- Gary Waddell as Dennis Obst
- John Brumpton as Lenny Morrison
- Jonathan Biggins

== Release ==
The film had its world premiere at the 12th Brisbane International Film Festival on 29 July 2003, and was theatrically released in Australia on 9 October 2003, by Hoyts Distribution. It received widespread critical acclaim, particularly for Wenham's performance, Teplitzky's direction, and Nyst's screenplay. At the 45th Australian Film Institute Awards, Gettin' Square earned a leading fourteen nominations, including Best Film, with Wenham winning Best Actor in a Leading Role. The film's sequel, Spit, went into production in 2024.

=== Home media ===
Gettin' Square was first released on DVD by Columbia Tristar in 2003. The DVD is compatible with region 4 and includes special features such as deleted scenes, a Popcorn Taxi Q&A, interviews with Jonathan Teplitzky, Chris Nyst, Timothy Spall, David Wenham, and audio commentary with Jonathan Teplitzky and Chris Nyst. It was re-released by Umbrella Entertainment in September 2011.

== Reception ==
=== Box office ===
According to the Motion Picture Distributors Association of Australia, Gettin' Square grossed $2,137,749, becoming the fifth-highest-grossing film of 2003 in Australia. VicScreen, formerly known as Film Victoria, reported that it made $2,292,587.

=== Critical response ===
David Stratton of Variety described the film as "a cleverly scripted, very Australian crime comedy" and "a feel-good combination of suspense and laughs distinguished by superb performances." Stratton also wrote, "Although the situations in the script are not new, Chris Nyst's characters and salty dialogue add freshness and energy."

Frank Hatherley of Screen Daily stated, "Teplitzky keeps the action flowing, jolting his audience with odd angles and never-still camera movements." Hatherley also noted, "The cast are excellent, revelling in Nyst's free-flowing comic dialogue, modern Aussie slang effortlessly raised to a street smart poetry. But it's David Wenham who makes the biggest impression," and called his performance "brilliant, career-enhancing."

Paul Byrnes of The Sydney Morning Herald commented, "The script works best when it's ruled by character, probably because Nyst knows the people he's writing about. When plot becomes more important, the film becomes just another crime movie."

The critic from The Age gave Gettin' Square 2.5 out of 5 stars and opined, "The film becomes overwhelmed by the narrative web of who is doing what to whom, the focus being on plot rather than pace. And while Worthington's character Barry is meant to be the lead, the film lacks sufficient focus on a central character arc."

Luke Buckmaster of The Guardian highlighted Wenham's "unmissable performance," writing that "Gettin' Square marks a rare comedic turn from Wenham and a performance so good it generated a loyal band of appreciators for whom his character's name, Johnny "Spit" Spitieri, will be forever synonymous with gales of laughter and highly quotable lines."

== Sequel ==
As of April 2024 the film's sequel, Spit, was in production and was released on 6 March 2025.

== Accolades ==
Award	Date of the ceremony	Category	Recipients	Result	Ref.
Film Critics Circle of Australia	7 November 2003	Best Film	Gettin' Square	nom	
Film Critics Circle of Australia	7 November 2003	Best Director	Jonathan Teplitzky	nom	
Film Critics Circle of Australia	7 November 2003	Best Actor – Male	David Wenham	won	
Film Critics Circle of Australia	7 November 2003	Best Screenplay – Original	Chris Nyst	nom	
Film Critics Circle of Australia	7 November 2003	Best Cinematography	Garry Phillips	nom	
Film Critics Circle of Australia	7 November 2003	Best Editing	Ken Sallows ASE	nom	
Australian Film Institute Awards	21 November 2003	Best Film	Gettin' Square	nom	
Australian Film Institute Awards	21 November 2003	Best Direction	Jonathan Teplitzky	nom	
Australian Film Institute Awards	21 November 2003	Best Actor in a Leading Role	Timothy Spall	nom	
Australian Film Institute Awards	21 November 2003	Best Actor in a Leading Role	David Wenham	won	
Australian Film Institute Awards	21 November 2003	Best Actor in a Supporting Role	Mitchell Butel	nom	
Australian Film Institute Awards	21 November 2003	Best Actor in a Supporting Role	David Field	nom	
Australian Film Institute Awards	21 November 2003	Best Actress in a Supporting Role	Helen Thomson	nom	
Australian Film Institute Awards	21 November 2003	Best Original Screenplay	Chris Nyst	nom	
Australian Film Institute Awards	21 November 2003	Best Original Music Score	Chit Chat Von Loopin Stab, 3KShort	nom	
Australian Film Institute Awards	21 November 2003	Best Cinematography	Garry Phillips	nom	
Australian Film Institute Awards	21 November 2003	Best Editing	Ken Sallows ASE	nom	
Australian Film Institute Awards	21 November 2003	Best Sound	John Schiefelbein, Antony Gray and Ian McLoughlin	nom	
Australian Film Institute Awards	21 November 2003	Best Production Design	Nicholas McCallum	nom	
Australian Film Institute Awards	21 November 2003	Best Costume Design	Jackline Sassine	nom	
Inside Film Awards	24 November 2003	Best Feature Film	Gettin' Square	nom	
Inside Film Awards	24 November 2003	Best Direction	Jonathan Teplitzky	nom	
Inside Film Awards	24 November 2003	Best Actor	David Wenham	won	
Inside Film Awards	24 November 2003	Best Script	Chris Nyst	won	
Inside Film Awards	24 November 2003	Best Music	Chit Chat Von Loopin Stab, 3KShort	won	
Inside Film Awards	24 November 2003	Best Cinematography	Garry Phillips	nom	
Inside Film Awards	24 November 2003	Best Editing	Ken Sallows ASE	won	
Inside Film Awards	24 November 2003	Best Sound	John Schiefelbein, Antony Gray and Ian McLoughlin	won	
Hawaiʻi International Film Festival	2003	Audience Award for Best Narrative Feature	Jonathan Teplitzky	won	

== See also ==
- List of films set in Australia
