= A Savage Christmas =

2023 Australian comedy drama film

- Directed by: Madeleine Dyer
- Screenplay by: Daniel Mulvihill; Madeleine Dyer; Max Jahufer
- Produced by: Ben McNeill; Daniel Mulvihill
- Starring: Darren Gilshenan; Helen Thomson; Ryan Morgan; David Roberts; Thea Raveneau; Max Jahufer; Rekha Ryan; Gary Sweet; Rachel Griffiths
- Cinematography: Shing Fung Cheung
- Edited by: Pip Hart
- Music by: Jason Fernandez
- Production companies: Roaring Entertainment, Mad Dan Productions, Intrinsic Story
- Distributed by: Bonsai Films, Odin's Eye Entertainment
- Release dates: 31 August 2023 (CinefestOZ); 16 November 2023 (Australia)
- Running time: 93 minutes
- Country: Australia
- Language: English

A Savage Christmas is a 2023 Australian comedy drama film directed by Madeleine Dyer, and starring Darren Gilshenan and Helen Thomson.

== Plot ==
After years of estrangement, transgender woman Davina Savage returns home for Christmas with her new boyfriend. Expecting her transition to be the focus, it is instead overshadowed by family secrets and lies which threaten not only their lives, but another Christmas lunch.

== Cast ==
- Darren Gilshenan as Uncle Dick
- Helen Thomson as Brenda Savage
- Ryan Morgan as Jimmy Jnr
- David Roberts as James Savage
- Thea Raveneau as Davina Savage
- Max Jahufer as Kane Lowry
- Rekha Ryan as Leia Savage
- Gary Sweet as Peter
- Rachel Griffiths as Doctor Gabrielle

== Production ==
A Savage Christmas is the feature directorial debut of Australian director Madeleine Dyer.

The film was produced by Ben McNeill and Daniel Mulvihill of Roaring Entertainment, which commenced production on A Savage Christmas in late 2022.

The film was shot in Brisbane, Queensland. According to the producers, "This story was (sic) developed over several years by a team of Queensland locals and represents many of the personal stories and experiences of the film’s key creatives".

== Release ==
A Savage Christmas premiered at CinefestOZ in August 2023, with a Queensland premiere at the 2023 Brisbane International Film Festival in November 2023.

The film was released to cinemas Australia-wide on 15 November 2023, and premieres on Australian streaming platform Binge on 15 December 2023.

== Response ==
=== Critical reception ===
Peter Walkden of Walkden Entertainment praised the film and awarded it seven stars, noting that "Right from the start, I found myself grinning like a young child and enjoying the numerous awkward moments shared among the multiple characters", adding that the film "carries entertaining moments of conflict and drama while being playful and slightly wacky, even more so whenever actors Darren Gilshenan and Gary Sweet appear on-screen." Andrew Peirce of The Curb wrote, "A Savage Christmas is a ridiculously funny and brilliantly scripted comedy that feels like a breath of fresh air", highlighting that "screen legends David Roberts, Helen Thomson, and Darren Gilshenan balance the bonkers with the grounded."

Writing for City Hub Sydney, Mark Morellini awarded the film three stars, noting "This is not a high budget movie, but surprisingly boasts high production standards. The explosion of emotions in the final scenes are hilarious and the poignant themes, which include the importance of forgiveness and family, are relatable and should resonate with audiences." Carla Huyssen of Theatre Haus summarised the film as "A little slow at times and relying on its more accomplished cast members, ‘A Savage Christmas’ packs a punch about equality and gender diversity, and leaves audiences with the notion that in the end, we’re all a little bit broken."

Despite praising the film for having its heart in the right place, and noting that the film tackles multiple relevant and interesting social issues, FilmInk's Robert D’Ottavi criticised the film, writing "It's the stuff that you have seen a million times before, except this time, it's sunny, bogan Queensland."

=== Accolades ===
A Savage Christmas received a nomination for the 2023 AACTA Award for Best Indie Film at the 13th annual AACTA Awards.

== See also ==
- List of Christmas films
