= Cop This! =

Book by Chris Nyst

- Author: Chris Nyst
- Cover artist: Klaus Lahnstein/The Photo Library
- Language: English
- Genre: Novel
- Publisher: HarperCollins Publishers
- Publication date: 1999
- Publication place: Australia
- Media type: Print (Softcover)
- Pages: 444 pp (Unknown Edition)
- ISBN: 0-7322-6458-8
- OCLC: 43491528

Cop This! is a novel written by Chris Nyst. It is about a bomb explosion in Fortitude Valley, Brisbane. The book was published in 1999 by HarperCollins Publishers Pty Ltd. Nyst drew on his 20 years as a criminal lawyer to write the book.

== Synopsis ==
In 1969, in Brisbane's Fortitude Valley a car bomb explodes. Eleven people are slain. The repercussions threaten the stability of the government. Johnny Arnold, a low-level criminal is charged with the crime. This brings a father and son duo in conflict with the state's leaders.

== Reception ==
According to The Sunday Times writer Chris Brice, Cop This! "received a standing ovation from reviewers, some suggesting Nyst was Australia's answer to US lawyer-turned-best-selling-novelist John Grisham." Adrian McGregor of The Australian wrote, "Nyst knows little about the science of plot structure, character development and background ambience, but is a great admirer of characters and language." T. O'Dwyer of The Courier-Mail said the book "hits hard and true mostly because of the frank words and phrases enhancing not only the speech of Nyst's cops and crims but also much of his own fast-moving narrative".
