= Supreme Cat Show =

Annual cat exhibition in England

The Supreme Cat Show is organised every year by the world's oldest cat registry, the Governing Council of the Cat Fancy, and used to take place each October at the National Exhibition Centre (NEC), in Birmingham, England. However, in 2022 it moved to the NAEC. Special awards of UK Champion and Supreme Champion can be gained at this show only. A contestant cat wins each show's "Best in Show" award.

== History ==
The first Supreme Cat Show took place in 1976. Until then the GCCF itself did not organise cat shows, but licensed shows put on by the breed clubs and area clubs affiliated to it. The Supreme Cat Show was devised as a special show, only open to cats which had won an open class at another championship show under GCCF rules, much in the same way that Crufts is only open to winning dogs. The show grew in size each year until it became big enough to be held at the NEC, which has been its home ever since.

== Show structure ==
Unlike most other shows, the GCCF's Supreme Show has no miscellaneous or club classes; it does, however, have classes other shows do not have. There are four Adult Open classes for each championship status breed: Champion Male and Female classes for full Champions, the winners being eligible for Grand Challenge Certificates and Pre-Champion Male and Female classes for cats with one or two Certificates, competing for Challenge Certificates. The same applies to the neuter classes which are split into Premier and Pre-Premier classes for males and females.

Cats which are already Grand Champions do not compete in these classes but in special classes for Grand Champions, Imperial Grand Champions, UK Grand Champions and UK & Imperial Grand Champions only, the winner being eligible for a UK Grand Challenge Certificate. Grand Premiers, Imperial Grand Premiers, UK Grand Premiers and UK & Imperial Grand Premiers compete for a UK Grand Premier Certificate. In these classes several breeds may compete together. UK Grand Certificates are only awarded at the Supreme Show; two such Certificates from different judges give the cat the title of UK Grand Champion/Premier or UK & Imperial Grand Champion/Premier if it has additionally gained that title. There is no Reserve UK Grand Challenge/Premier Certificate.

Best of Breed winners at the Supreme Show do not get certificates but compete against the other BOB winners in their section for Best of Variety.

The seven Best of Variety Adults (Persian, Semi-Longhair, British, Foreign, Burmese, Oriental and Siamese) compete for Supreme Adult, the seven kittens for Supreme Kitten and the seven neuters for Supreme Neuter. The Supreme Adult and the Neuter can add the coveted word 'Supreme' to their title.

Finally, the Supreme Adult, Supreme Kitten and Supreme Neuter compete against each other for the honour of being judged Supreme Exhibit.

== Non-pedigree and pedigree pet cats ==
Non-pedigree cats (cats of traditional “moggie” appearance) and pedigree pet cats (cats looking like pedigrees with known, unknown, full or half pedigree background) are also permitted to enter the Supreme Cat Show. They can also compete for the same levels of title as the pedigree cats but these are for "Master Cat" titles as opposed to "Champion" and "Premier" ones. They then go on to compete to win the title of Supreme Non-Pedigree or Supreme Pedigree Pet Cat. Classes are also included for kittens, with both non-pedigree and pedigree pet kittens competing for the title of Supreme Household Pet Kitten.

== Supreme Best in Show winners ==
The show was not held in 2020 and 2021 due to the Covid-19 pandemic.

Year	Breed	Pedigree Name	Owner	Breeder	Section
2026	Norwegian forest cat	GrPr Forestshadow Oliver	TBA	Mr D Handy	section 2
2025	Asian	Olympian Gold, Imperial Grand Premier Debretts Thalia of Beauty	Ged Dockrell	Jane Kibble	Section 5
2024	Abyssinian	Abydreames Dathuil	Michael & Lillian Eames	Michael & Lillian Eames	Section 4 (Foreign)
2023	Abyssinian	Abydreames Clara Bow	Nathan Gilbert	Michael & Lillian Eames	Section 4 (Foreign)
2022	RagaMuffin	Supreme UK Olympian Gold Imperial Grand Premier Cheham Chantilly Lace	Ellen Camilleri	Chris Powell & Alan Wells	Section 2 (Semi-longhair)
2019	Russian Blue	Olympian Silver, Imperial Grand Champion Melkelter Galiya Gertruda	Mr & Mrs P Phillips	Mr & Mrs P Phillips	Section 4 (Foreign)
2018	Red Silver Tabby & White Persian	UK Olympian Gold, Imperial Grand Champion & Grand Premier Riascatz Dandy Lion	Jade Gore	Marie Hill	Section 1 (Persian)
2017	Brown Tabby & White Persian	Imperial Grand Champion & Olympian Silver, Imperial Grand Premier Cullykhan Vivaldi	Carol Tonks	Angela Millican	Persian
2016	Blue Point Birman	Tweediemill Islay Mist	Mrs J Sharp	Mrs J Sharp	Semi-Longhair
2015	British Blue	Supreme UK Imperial Grand Premier Kolinga Emrys	Ms S Cresswell	Mr A & Mrs C Brown	British
2014	Lilac Tortie British Shorthair	Supreme Grand Premier Pinemarten Tina Sparkle	Mrs P Hopgood	Mr & Mrs Parry	British
2013	White Persian male	Supreme UK Olympian Bronze Imperial Grand Champion Gemkin Starwind	Mrs J L Nicholas	Mrs J L Nicholas	Persian
2012	White Persian male	Supreme UK Olympian Bronze Imperial Grand Champion Gemkin Starwind	Mrs J L Nicholas	Mrs J L Nicholas	Persian
2011	Black Smoke and White Cornish Rex	Champion Supreme UK & Imperial Grand Premier Crisan Camelott	Miss E M Hummerston	Mrs C A Thompson	Foreign
2010	Brown Classic Tabby Maine Coon	Supreme Champion Julescoon Dexter	Mr & Mrs Gregson	Mr & Mrs Gregson	Semi-Longhair
2009	Brown Burmese	Supreme UK Imperial Grand Champion Mainman Kisschase	Ms J Mooney & Miss S Reid	Ms J Mooney & Miss S Reid	Burmese
2008	Tortie Tabby Maine Coon	Supreme UK Imperial Grand Premier Dairymaine Sarnia Cherie	Miss S Rabey	Mrs J M Haynes	Semi-Longhair
2007	Cream Point Siamese	Supreme UK & Imperial Grand Premier Tianlex Full Monty	Dr J H Muir-Taylor	Mrs P Cook	Siamese
2006	Black Smoke Devon Rex	Supreme UK & Imperial Grand Champion Grizabella Ohbladi Ohblada	Mr & Mrs J A Boucher	Mrs I Challis	Foreign
2005	Red Tabby Maine Coon	Supreme UK & Imperial Grand Premier Dairymaine Chestaton	Mrs J M Haynes	Mrs J M Haynes	Semi-Longhair
2004	Orange-eyed White Persian	Grand Champion & Supreme UK Grand Premier Lindenlea Reachfor Thesky	Mrs J A Raffaelli	Miss G G Houston	Persian
2003	Red Tabby Manx male neuter	Grand Champion and Supreme Grand Premier Tattlebury Tudur	Mrs J Hellman	Mrs J Hellman	British
2002	Chinchilla female neuter	Supreme UK Grand Premier Yankidoodle Fairy Dust	Miss C E Wheeler	Mrs S L Signy	Persian
2001	Red Burmese male	Supreme UK Grand Champion Oakenshield Buster Bertie	Mrs N Bass	Mrs C E Kempe	Burmese
2000	Chocolate Tabby Colourpoint male	Grand Champion Amoramist Who's Gorgeous	Mrs M Holden-Ritchie	Mrs M Holden-Ritchie	Persian
1999	Chocolate Silver Shaded Oriental Shorthair male neuter	Grand Champion and Supreme Grand Premier Chelanca Lord Gyllene	Mrs C Wooler	Mrs B Fellows	Oriental
1998	Chocolate Burmese female	Grand Champion Hypnos Pearly Pandora	Ms S L Hope	Mrs S L Hope	Burmese
1997	Oriental Shorthair Red male	Champion and Grand Premier Meshuga Firestarter	Ms C J Hamilton & Mr D Cooke	Ms C J Hamilton & Mr D Cooke	Oriental
1996	Auburn Turkish Van male neuter	Supreme UK Grand Premier Akdamar Bazisey Mahsus	Mrs J Johnson	Mrs J Johnson	Semi-Longhair
1995	Auburn Turkish Van male neuter	Supreme UK Grand Premier Akdamar Bazisey Mahsus	Mrs J Johnson	Mrs J Johnson	Semi-Longhair
1994	Havana male	Supreme Grand Champion and Grand Premier Rimana Sangria	Mrs C Wooller	Mr M J & Mrs M Ward	Oriental
1993	Blue Persian male neuter	Champion and Supreme Grand Premier Firanti Blue Fiori	Miss A Bowman	Mrs D Cooke	Persian
1992	Auburn Turkish Van male	Premier Akdamar Toru	Mrs L M Keeler	Mrs J Johnson	Semi-Longhair
1986	Red Point Siamese male	Supreme Grand Champion Pannaduloa Blazer	Mr J Hansson	Mr J Hansson	Persian
1985	Tortoiseshell Persian female	Supreme Grand Champion Honeycharm Jasmine	Mrs B Patch	Mrs B Patch	Persian
1984	Red Tabby Point Siamese male	Supreme Grand Champion Soria Sanjo Panza	Mrs M E Hunt	Mrs M E Hunt	Siamese
1983	Blue Persian male	Supreme Grand Champion Fleurielle Model T	Mrs T Mellor	Mrs T Mellor	Siamese
1982	Chocolate Tabby Point Siamese male	Supreme Grand Champion Zachary Apollo	Mrs D Sills	Mrs J Lynn	Siamese
1981	Blue Point Persian male	Supreme Grand Champion Premontre Tancred	Mrs M E Shingleton	Mrs M E Shingleton	Persian
1979	Black & White Manx male	Supreme Grand Champion Tatleberry Long John	Mrs A Jameson	Mrs J Hellman	British
1978	Seal Point Persian male	Supreme Grand Champion Cobden Charlie	Mrs A Boothman	Mrs Ryan	Persian
1977	Green-Eyed Silver Tipped Persian (Chinchilla) male	Supreme Grand Champion Snowbloom Ja'Bin	Mrs K Evans	Mrs K Evans	Persian
1976	Chocolate Tabby Point Siamese female	Supreme Grand Champion Moondance Jocasta	Mrs J B Brain	Mrs J B Brain	Siamese

== Other attractions ==
Numerous activities take place alongside the competition judging. There are children's activities, such as judging of soft toys, and a large range of stalls selling cat related items, such as cat food, toys, accessories, collectables, books, magazines etc. Various other cat organisations, such as the Feline Advisory Bureau and Cats Protection regularly have information stalls. There is also a large section of the show hall given over to Club Row, where various cat clubs affiliated to the GCCF have stalls where visitors to the show can come and meet the different breeds of cat and obtain information.
