= David Roberts (Australian actor) =

Australian actor

- Education: Victorian College of the Arts
- Occupation: Actor
- Years active: 1984–present
- Spouse: Helen Thomson (m. 2000)
- Children: 2

David Roberts is an Australian actor who has appeared in television, film and theatre.

== Early life ==
Roberts graduated from the Victorian College of the Arts in 1987.

== Career ==
=== Television ===
Roberts began acting on screen in the early 1990s, with guest roles in television series including medical drama The Flying Doctors, sitcom All Together Now and miniseries Seven Deadly Sins. He also played the recurring guest role of Detective Brett Murray in Halifax f.p. alongside Rebecca Gibney.

His first big break was in crime drama series Phoenix playing Detective Russell Howie, followed by a role in newsroom drama Mercury, opposite Geoffrey Rush playing Dave 'Gibbo' Gibson.

In 2005, Roberts joined the cast of ABC family series Holly's Heroes, playing the driven Coach Peterson. He then appeared in long running soap opera Home and Away in 2009, playing ill-fated trawler owner, Lou De Bono, a love interest for Irene Roberts (Lynne McGranger). In 2013, he had a lead role in comedy series Please Like Me, playing Alan, the father of Josh Thomas's character.

In 2019, Roberts played a senior member of Parliament in political series Total Control, alongside Rachel Griffiths and Deborah Mailman in 2019. More recently, he appeared in 2023 SBS drama thriller miniseries Safe Home and opposite his wife Helen Thomson, as Bernie in award-winning television series Colin from Accounts.

Further television credits include Devil's Playground, The Code, Secret City, Rake, Offspring, Bad Mothers, Barons, Queen of Oz, Silver and Sunny Nights.

=== Film ===
Roberts is best known for his role as Captain Roland in the 2003 science-fiction action films The Matrix Reloaded and The Matrix Revolutions, alongside Keanu Reeves and Hugo Weaving. He has also appeared in 2007 Marvel Comics adaptation Ghost Rider, starring Nicolas Cage.

In 2008, he was nominated for an AACTA Award for Best Actor in a Leading Role for the role of Raymond Yale in Nash Edgerton's feature film debut, the thriller The Square. In 2014, he appeared in gritty crime drama film The Convict.

He starred opposite his wife in the films Gettin' Square (2002), A Savage Christmas (2023) and Spit (2025), the latter in which he reprised his role from Gettin' Square.

Other film credits include Me Myself I (2000), alongside Rachel Griffiths, Three Dollars (2005) with David Wenham and Frances O'Connor and US productions Fool's Gold (2008) opposite Matthew McConaughey and Kate Hudson and Unbroken (2014) by Angelina Jolie.

On 11 April 2025, Roberts was named to appear in the film Posthumous.

=== Theatre ===
Roberts has performed in stage productions for Griffin, Belvoir, and Malthouse Theatre.

He appeared in Melbourne Theatre Company productions of Les Liaisons Dangereuses and The Touch of Silk in 1988 followed by The Recruiting Officer and Our Country's Good in 1989.

He acted together with his wife in a stage production of In the Next Room (or The Vibrator Play) in 2011.

== Personal life ==
Roberts is married to fellow actor Helen Thomson. Together they have two children and reside at Wentworth Falls in the Blue Mountains, west of Sydney.

== Awards and nominations ==
Year	Title	Award	Category	Result	Ref.
2008	The Square	Australian Film Institute Awards	Best Lead Actor	Nominated	
2014	Please Like Me	Equity Ensemble Awards	Outstanding Performance by an Ensemble in a Comedy Series	Nominated	
2014	Power Games: The Packer–Murdoch War	Equity Ensemble Awards	Outstanding Performance by an Ensemble in a Miniseries or Telemovie	Nominated	

== Filmography ==
=== Film ===
Year	Title	Role	Notes
1984	Attack on Fear	Seth Andersen	TV movie
1988	Miracle at Beekman's Place		TV movie
1990	Beyond My Reach	Christopher Brookes	Feature film
1990	Nirvana Street Murder	Policeman	Feature film
1997	Nightride		Short film
1999	Me Myself I	Robert Dickson	Feature film
2003	Roundabout	Michael Taylor	Short film
2003	The Matrix Reloaded	Captain Roland	Feature film
2003	The Matrix Revolutions	Captain Roland	Feature film
2003	Gettin' Square	Niall Toole	Feature film
2005	A Divided Heart	Charles Vickery	
2005	Three Dollars	Gerard	Feature film
2006	Small Claims: The Reunion	Peter Hindmarsh	TV movie
2007	Ghost Rider	Captain Jack Dolan	Feature film
2007	Skin		Short film
2009	Fool's Gold	Cyrus	Feature film
2009	The Square	Raymond Yale	Feature film
2010	The Foal	Uncle John	Short film
2012	Careless Love	Mr Stevenson	Feature film
2012	Fatal Honeymoon	Daniel Samuels	TV movie
2013	The Landing	Edward	Short film
2014	The Convict	Harvey	Feature film
2014	Unbroken	Officer Collier	Feature film
2017	My Pet Dinosaur	Doctor	Feature film
2018	Slam	Alan McLeary	Feature film
2020	Occupation: Rainfall	Abraham	Feature film
2023	A Savage Christmas	James Savage Sr	Feature film
2025	Spit	Niall Toole	Feature film
2026	Posthumous	Neil	Film

=== Television ===
Year	Title	Role	Notes	Ref.
1990	The Flying Doctors	Peter Gardiner	1 episode	
1991	All Together Now	Etienne	1 episode	
1991	Chances	Matt Hennessy	24 episodes	
1993	Seven Deadly Sins	Alistair	Miniseries, 1 episode	
1993	Phoenix	Robert Howie	10 episodes	
1993	Law of the Land	Peter Lawrence	13 episodes	
1996	Snowy River: The McGregor Saga	John Archer	1 episode	
1996	Mercury	Dave Gibson	13 episodes	
1997	Big Sky	Pete Martin	1 episode	
1998	Wildside	Murray Anders	1 episode	
1998	Water Rats	Barry Strong	2 episodes	
2000	Tales of the South Seas		Episode: "The Boxer Rebellion"	
2000; 2002	Halifax f.p.	Detective Murray	2 episodes	
2001	Do or Die	Dr Baker	Miniseries	
2001	Head Start	Stephen Perry	1 episode	
2002	The Lost World	Morden	Miniseries, 1 episode	
2002	BackBerner	David Frost	1 episode	
2002	Bootleg	Martin Burrows	3 episodes	
2003	Out There	Johnathan Archer	1 episode	
2003	The Secret Life of Us	Bruce Lane	2 episodes	
2003	Blue Heelers	Peter Ball	1 episode	
2003	MDA	John Alfrano	4 episodes	
2005	Last Man Standing	Gerry	1 episode	
2005	Holly's Heroes	Alan Peterson	26 episodes	
2007–2008	Satisfaction	Tim	3 episodes	
2007–2008	All Saints	Graeme Collins / Owen Ferguson	2 episodes	
2009	Rescue: Special Ops	Ed Frazer	2 episodes	
2009	City Homicide	Max McKenzie	2 episodes	
2009	The Jesters	Andrew Shrapton	1 episode	
2009	Underbelly: Razor	Frank de Groot	1 episode	
2009–2015	Home and Away	Judge Menzies / Lou de Bono	20 episodes	
2010–2016	Rake	Norton	4 episodes	
2011	Underbelly: A Tale of Two Cities	Angus Campbell	2 episodes	
2011–2017	Offspring	Phil D'Arabont	15 episodes	
2012	Tricky Business	David Lang	1 episode	
2012	Devil's Dust	Ian Hutchinson	2 episodes	
2013	The Packer Murdoch Story	David McNicoll	Miniseries, 2 episodes	
2013	Miss Fisher's Murder Mysteries	Lachlan Pepper	1 episode	
2013–2016	Please Like Me	Dad	27 episodes	
2014	The Code	Peter Lawson	3 episodes	
2016	Secret City	General McAulffie	6 episodes	
2016	Soul Mates	Mayor of Bondi	2 episodes	
2017	True Story with Hamish & Andy	Chris	1 episode	
2018	The Blacklist	Desk Sergeant	1 episode	
2018	Fighting Season	Ian Vogel	4 episodes	
2019	Bad Mothers	Harry	5 episodes	
2019	Total Control	Kevin Cartwright	6 episodes	
2020	Drunk History Australia	Cricketer	1 episode	
2021	Blue Bloods	Lieutenant	1 episode	
2022	Barons	George Thompson	4 episodes	
2022	Colin From Accounts	Bernie	2 episodes	
2023	Safe Home	Gerard Priestly	4 episodes	
2023	Queen of Oz	Richard Steele	3 episodes	
2025	Scrublands: Silver	Vern Jones	4 episodes	
TBA	Dalliance	TBA	TV series	

== Theatre ==
Year	Title	Role	Notes	Ref.
1987	King Lear	Edmund	Guild Theatre, Melbourne	
1988	Les Liaisons Dangereuses	Le Chevalier Danceny	Playhouse, Melbourne with MTC	
1988	The Touch of Silk	David Ritchie	Playhouse, Melbourne with MTC	
1989	The Recruiting Officer	Costar Piermain	Playhouse, Melbourne with MTC	
1989	Our Country's Good	Midshipman Harry Brewer	Playhouse, Melbourne with MTC	
1994	On the North Diversion Road		Beckett Theatre, Melbourne with Playbox	
1995	The Incorruptible		Merlyn Theatre, Melbourne, with Playbox / STC	
1995	The Head of Mary		Merlyn Theatre, Melbourne, with Playbox	
1998	Natural Life		Merlyn Theatre, Melbourne, with Playbox & Queen's Theatre, Adelaide with STCSA	
2003–2004	King Lear	Edgar	Merlyn Theatre, Melbourne, with Playbox & Tokyo / Nagoya / Seoul tour	
2011	In the Next Room (or The Vibrator Play)	Dr Givings	Sydney Opera House with STC	

== Music video ==
- Embracing Me (2015) by SAFIA
