= Ben McNeill =

Australian film producer

- Born: Sydney, Australia
- Occupation: Film producer
- Years active: 2003–present

Ben McNeill is an Australian film producer of feature and documentary films, including the 2023 Australian comedy drama film A Savage Christmas, which was nominated for Best Indie Film at the 13th annual AACTA Awards. In 2018, he co-produced organ transplant feature documentary Dying to Live (2018), which follows those awaiting an organ on the organ transplant list, and which was shortlisted for a 2018 AACTA Award.

McNeill has collaborated with filmmaker Mark Lewis on the projects Cane Toads: The Conquest (2010) and The Standard of Perfection series specials, and Australian producer Trish Lake on the theatrical feature documentary Frackman and Australian-Canadian drama co-production Early Winter.

McNeill is the managing director of the production company Benjamac Entertainment and is based in Canberra, Australia.

== Feature films ==
- A Savage Christmas (2023)
- Dying to Live (2018)
