= Colin from Accounts =

Australian comedy television series

- Genre: Romantic dramedy
- Created by: Harriet Dyer; Patrick Brammall
- Directed by: Trent O'Donnell; Madeleine Dyer; Matthew Moore; Robyn Butler & Wayne Hope
- Starring: Harriet Dyer; Patrick Brammall
- Composer: Matt Blackman
- Country of origin: Australia
- Original language: English
- No. of seasons: 3
- No. of episodes: 24

Production
- Executive producers: Alison Hurbert-Burns; Trent O'Donnell; Patrick Brammall; Harriet Dyer; Brian Walsh (S1); Lana Greenhalgh (S2); Rob Gibson (S2); Ian Collie (S2)
- Producers: Rob Gibson (S1); Ian Collie (S1); Kevin Greene (S2)
- Cinematography: Emma Paine
- Camera setup: Multi-camera
- Running time: 30 minutes
- Production companies: Easy Tiger Productions; CBS Studios

Original release
- Network: Binge
- Release: 1 December 2022 – 7 September 2026

Colin from Accounts is an Australian romantic dramedy television series created and written by husband-and-wife team Patrick Brammall and Harriet Dyer, who also star as the show's main characters, Gordon and Ashley. It is produced by Easy Tiger Productions and CBS Studios for Foxtel, and streams in Australia on Binge. The show aired on BBC Two in the UK and streams on BBC iPlayer. It started streaming on Paramount+ in the US on 9 November 2023.

The series is Binge's second original production after Love Me and premiered on Binge and Foxtel services on 1 December 2022, with all eight episodes being released simultaneously.

After achieving international success, including three Logie Awards in Australia, Colin from Accounts was renewed for a second season in August 2023. It began airing on 30 May 2024 on Binge.

On 9 April 2025, it was announced that the series had been renewed for a third season. The third and final season began airing on 27 July 2026.

== Cast and characters ==
- Harriet Dyer as Ashley Molden, a medical student and then GP
- Patrick Brammall as "Flash" Gordon Crapp, a bar owner and craft brewer
- Emma Harvie as Megan, Ashley's colleague and friend
- Genevieve Hegney as Chiara, Gordon's business partner
- Helen Thomson as Lynelle, Ashley's mother
- Michael Logo as Brett, Gordon and Chiara's employee
- Annie Maynard as Yvette, a veterinary surgeon and Gordon's ex
- Tai Hara as James, Ashley's ex and colleague
- Glenn Hazeldine as Gene, Ashley's work supervisor and acquaintance of Gordon
- Darren Gilshenan as Professor Lee, Lynelle's eccentric partner
- Tony Llewellyn-Jones as Dr Bruce, Gordon's doctor
- David Roberts as Bernie, Megan's father
- Arka Das as Justin, Brett's ineffective lawyer
- Mark Trevorrow as Stuart, Ashley's estranged father
- Justin Rosniak as Alistair "Heavy" Crapp, Gordon's brother
- Celeste Barber as Katie, Heavy's wife and Gordon's sister-in-law
- Lynne Porteous as Dawn, Gordon and Heavy's mother
- Zak and Buster as Colin from Accounts, the dog co-owned by Ashley and Gordon
- Christie Whelan Browne as Belinda, Gordon's date in series 1
- Nikki Shiels as Chelsea, Gordon's romantic partner in series 3
- Thomas Cocquerel as David, Ashley's romantic partner in series 3

== Episodes ==
Season	Episodes	Originally released	
Season	Episodes	First released	Last released
1	8	1 December 2022	
2	8	30 May 2024	27 June 2024
3	8	27 July 2026	7 September 2026

=== Season 1 (2022) ===
No. overall	No. in season	Title	Directed by	Written by	Original release date
1	1	"The Flash"	Trent O'Donnell	Harriet Dyer	1 December 2022
Walker Ashley impulsively flashes driver Gordon as she crosses the road, distracting him enough to hit a nearby home's escaped dog with his car. They take him to a vet and the large bill gives them much to decide.
2	2	"Benedict Cumbercrapp"	Trent O'Donnell	Patrick Brammall	1 December 2022
When Ashley makes a mess in Gordon’s sock drawer, she makes an impromptu trip to Costco with Colin, Megan and her mother, to buy Gordon some new furniture. An argument ensues between Gordon and Ashley about when she will vacate his rental. Gordon goes on a date and although the woman is interested with him, she is put out about Gordon’s setup with Ashley.
3	3	"Toyota Cressida"	Trent O'Donnell	Harriet Dyer	1 December 2022
Gordon accidentally sends Ashley a dick pic and chases her from a garage sale to a death bed to try and delete it. Gordon also gets a medical inspection in an uncomfortable location. Upon celebration of a brewery review, Ashley and Gordon experience a sexual encounter that ends awkwardly due to Gordon’s medical worries.
4	4	"Bubbly Sophie"	Madeleine Dyer	Patrick Brammall	1 December 2022
Ashley worries to Megan why Gordon rejected her the previous night, where the latter offers her to stay at her place. Gordon’s partners start to worry about his distracted focus away from the microbrewery. Ashley moves Colin and her stuff to Megan’s place, where Gordon receives a late night text from his ex.
5	5	"My Amiga"	Matthew Moore	Harriet Dyer	1 December 2022
Ashley has to leave Megan’s place and has a bad day at work. The brewery power goes out as Gordon hadn't paid the bill. Ashley takes charge to rectify the power bill and some outstanding invoices, impressing the Echo Park gang.
6	6	"The Good Room"	Matthew Moore	Patrick Brammall	1 December 2022
Ashley reluctantly takes Gordon to her 30th birthday dinner with her mum Lynelle and partner, creepy Professor Lee. Ashley confides in Gordon, which draws them closer.
7	7	"Bandit"	Matthew Moore	Harriet Dyer	1 December 2022
Ashley invites her party-loving friends to Echo Park to celebrate her birthday. Tensions arise throughout the night between Ashley and Gordon.
8	8	"High Needs People"	Matthew Moore	Patrick Brammall	1 December 2022
Ashley and Gordon must find a new home for Colin so they can go their separate ways.

=== Season 2 (2024) ===
No. overall	No. in season	Title	Directed by	Written by	Original release date
9	1	"Blessings"	Trent O'Donnell	Patrick Brammall	30 May 2024
Ash and Gordon have moved in together, but there’s a big, Colin-shaped hole in their hearts as they try to get their beloved special needs dog back from his new owners – and work out whether they want a relationship or if they just wanted a dog. Brett is stressed about having to move out from home. Chiara admits that she is sexting with Meghan when caught by Gordon. Gordon asks Colin’s previous owner, Matt, to confirm that they bought Colin only to find that he is a friend of the new owners. They then try to kidnap Colin before thinking better of the idea. Colin, who is chipped, goes missing only to be returned to Ash and Gordon by the vet. The new owners accept defeat. The vet tells Gordon that she is pregnant by him and that she intends to keep the baby.
10	2	"Bacon in the Drawer"	Trent O'Donnell	Harriet Dyer	6 June 2024
Ash is confused by Gordon’s tetchiness. Gordon has a less than satisfactory meeting with his doctor who confirms he may well have been responsible for Yvette’s pregnancy. Yvette tells him that only he can be the father but that she doesn't want anything from him but will be waiting for him. Gordon decides to come clean with Ashley and they have to come to terms with Yvette's latest play for Gordon's affections. He runs into Ashley’s tutor who he knows from his cancer treatment. Ashley calls on her mum only to find that Lee has moved back in. Learning that Yvette is hoping for her relationship to come to an end Ashley insists on talking to her at the surgery. Gordon learns that Yvette’s nurse Mica may be the father.
11	3	"Heavy"	Trent O'Donnell	Patrick Brammall	6 June 2024
Gordon's house is overrun by chaotic visitors, including his brother Heavy, who makes things awkward with Ashley when he indelicately sheds some light on Gordon's past.
12	4	"Ethical Porn"	Trent O'Donnell	Harriet Dyer	13 June 2024
Ashley feels rejected after catching Gordon masturbating, Gordon gets an offer to buy Echo Park, and Megan introduces her new girlfriend.
13	5	"Waterfall"	Robyn Butler & Wayne Hope	Patrick Brammall	13 June 2024
When Ashley doesn't turn up to dinner, Gordon goes on a quest around Sydney to find her.
14	6	"Yass King"	Madeleine Dyer	Harriet Dyer	20 June 2024
Ashley and Gordon head to Yass for a weekend at home with Gordon's family.
15	7	"Wawam"	Robyn Butler & Wayne Hope	Patrick Brammall	20 June 2024
Gordon redirects his grief into making Colin a TV star, while Ashley tries to make amends for her hurtful comment about Gordon’s father. Lynelle hosts a fundraiser for Women Against Women Against Men (WAWAM). The brewery is running financially in the red, causing Gordon’s coworkers to question their continued involvement in the brewery. Gordon finds a last minute saving inheritance for his business.
16	8	"Speedy Susans"	Robyn Butler & Wayne Hope	Harriet Dyer	27 June 2024
Gordon and Ashley attend Megan and Rumi's pop-up wedding held at the brewery. Despite his attempts Gordon finds it difficult to apologize to Rumi for his previous actions. Gordon and Ashley get tied up on the romance of the occasion to declare their feelings for each other, but Gordon takes those intentions way too far.

=== Season 3 (2026) ===
No. overall	No. in season	Title	Directed by	Written by	Original release date
17	1	"Receptive Penile"	Trent O'Donnell	Harriet Dyer	27 July 2026
18	2	"Clean, Honest, Open, Transparent Love"	Trent O'Donnell	Patrick Brammall	27 July 2026
19	3	"Monstera"	Madeleine Dyer	Harriet Dyer	3 August 2026
20	4	"New Beginnings Champagne Breakfast"	Madeleine Dyer	Patrick Brammall	10 August 2026
21	5	"Druggy Druggy Sex Party"	Madeleine Dyer	Harriet Dyer	17 August 2026
22	6	"Matching Set"	Trent O'Donnell	Patrick Brammall	24 August 2026
23	7	"Is That All There Is?"	Madeleine Dyer	Harriet Dyer	31 August 2026
24	8	"Rum 'n' Raisin"	Trent O'Donnell	Patrick Brammall	7 September 2026

== Production ==
Colin from Accounts is a CBS Studios production in association with Easy Tiger Productions for Foxtel with production in Sydney, Australia, commencing in February 2022. A second series was announced in October 2023, and filming began in November 2023. A third series was announced in September 2025, to be streamed on Binge in late 2026.

== Reception ==
The first season holds a 100% score on review aggregator Rotten Tomatoes, based on 29 critic reviews with an average rating of 7.9/10. The website's critics consensus reads, "Tonally elastic and blessed with Patrick Brammall and Harriet Dyer's sparky chemistry, Colin from Accounts makes the alchemy of a satisfying rom-com feel effortless." On Metacritic, which uses a weighted average, the season holds a score of 80/100, based on seven critics, indicating "generally favorable" reviews.

The second season holds a 100% "Fresh" score on Rotten Tomatoes, based on 22 reviews with an average rating of 9.0/10. The website's critics consensus reads, "Retaining its first season's laidback charms without resting on its hind legs, Colin from Accounts' second outing is as cranky, funny, and delightful as ever." On Metacritic, the season holds a score of 90/100, based on eight critics, indicating "universal acclaim".

Kylie Northover of The Sydney Morning Herald gave the show 4 stars stating "Yes, that's right: it's a romcom. But Australian romcom offerings, particularly on television, are something of a rarity, so to see one executed well, and with particular emphasis on the 'com', is a genuine treat." Film and TV critic Luke Buckmaster from Guardian Australia also gave the series 4 stars, praising the writing efforts of co-stars Harriet Dyer and Patrick Brammall: "Here we're in good hands, with Dyer creating the show and co-writing it with Brammall, the pair developing their roles from the inside out – creating personalities that slowly reveal layers, nuances and virtues in ways that feel genuine and germane to the narrative." The Economist listed Colin From Accounts among the best TV shows of 2023, describing it as "charming" and calling the dialogue "superb".

== Awards and nominations ==
Award	Year	Category	Nominee(s)	Result	Ref.
AACTA Awards	2023	Best Narrative Comedy Series	Ian Collie, Rob Gibson, Patrick Brammall, and Harriet Dyer	Won	
AACTA Awards	2023	Best Acting in a Comedy	Patrick Brammall	Nominated	
AACTA Awards	2023	Best Acting in a Comedy	Harriet Dyer	Nominated	
AACTA Awards	2023	Best Acting in a Comedy	Helen Thomson	Nominated	
AACTA Awards	2023	Best Direction in Drama or Comedy	Trent O'Donnell (for "Toyota Cressida")	Nominated	
AACTA Awards	2023	Best Direction in Drama or Comedy	Matthew Moore (for "The Good Room")	Nominated	
AACTA Awards	2023	Best Screenplay in Television	Patrick Brammall (for "The Good Room")	Nominated	
AACTA Awards	2023	Best Screenplay in Television	Harriet Dyer (for "Toyota Cressida")	Nominated	
AACTA Awards	2023	Best Casting	Kirsty McGregor and Stevie Ray	Nominated	
AACTA Awards	2023	Best Editing	Danielle Boesenberg (for "Toyota Cressida")	Nominated	
AACTA Awards	2025	Best Narrative Comedy Series	Kevin Greene, Ian Collie, Rob Gibson (Binge, Foxtel)	Nominated	
AACTA Awards	2025	Best Acting in a Comedy	Patrick Brammall	Nominated	
AACTA Awards	2025	Best Acting in a Comedy	Harriet Dyer	Nominated	
AACTA Awards	2025	Best Acting in a Comedy	Genevieve Hegney	Nominated	
AACTA Awards	2025	Best Direction in Drama or Comedy	Trent O'Donnell – Episode 3: Heavy	Nominated	
AACTA Awards	2025	Best Direction in Drama or Comedy	Madeline Dyer – Episode 6: Yass King	Nominated	
AACTA Awards	2025	Best Screenplay in Television	Patrick Brammall & Harriet Dyer – Episode 6: Yass King	Nominated	
AACTA Awards	2025	Best Casting	Kirsty McGregor & Stevie Ray – Colin from Accounts	Nominated	
AACTA Awards	2025	Best Editing in Television	Danielle Bosenberg – Episode 3: Heavy	Nominated	
ADG Directors Awards	2023	Best Direction in a TV or SVOD Comedy Series Episode	Matthew Moore (for "The Good Room")	Nominated	
AWGIE Awards	2024	Comedy – Situation or Narrative	Harriet Dyer (for "Flash")	Won	
AWGIE Awards	2024	Comedy – Situation or Narrative	Patrick Brammall (for "The Good Room")	Nominated	
AWGIE Awards	2026	Comedy – Situation or Narrative	Patrick Brammall (for "Waterfall")	Pending	
Casting Guild of Australia Awards	2023	Best Casting in a TV Comedy	Kirsty McGregor and Stevie Ray	Won	
Equity Ensemble Awards	2023	Most Outstanding Performance by an Ensemble in a Comedy Series	Harriet Dyer, Patrick Brammall, Emma Harvie, Helen Thomson, Genevieve Hegney, Michael Logo, and Tai Hara	Won	
Logie Awards	2023	Most Outstanding Comedy Program	Colin from Accounts	Won	
Logie Awards	2023	Most Popular Actor	Patrick Brammall	Nominated	
Logie Awards	2023	Most Outstanding Actor	Patrick Brammall	Won	
Logie Awards	2023	Most Outstanding Actress	Harriet Dyer	Won	
Logie Awards	2025	Best Lead Actor in a Comedy	Patrick Brammall	Nominated	
Logie Awards	2025	Best Lead Actress in a Comedy	Harriet Dyer	Nominated	
Logie Awards	2025	Best Supporting Actor	Darren Gilshenan	Nominated	
Logie Awards	2025	Best Scripted Comedy Program	Colin from Accounts	Nominated	
Satellite Awards	2025	Best Actor – TV Series Musical or Comedy	Patrick Brammall	Won	
Rose d'Or	2023	Comedy Drama and Sitcom	Colin from Accounts	Nominated	
Venice TV Awards	2023	Best TV Series	Colin from Accounts	Nominated	
