= Longshots (film) =

Longshots is a 1994 46-minute-long documentary film directed and written by film directors Maureen Marovitch and David Finch, and produced by Ina Finchman (through her then company, Productions Maximage). The documentary's motto is: Shut up and make video!. Since the original producer had shut down after that, Maureen and Finch retrieved the rights through their own company, Picture This Productions. It is available from them today on DVD format.

== Plot ==
The film shows a group of street kids, aged 17 to 23, that are in a tough bunch: sometimes they do not show up and one gets out of jail. It shows their passion to create and tell stories. We thus discover their world and learn about their hidden dreams as they document their experiences on videotape.

== Reception ==
The film was well received, specifically by CBC's former Director of Independent documentaries, Jerry McIntosh, who said: "These are passionate, committed film makers who are determined to follow their characters into challenging physical and emotional territory, no matter how treacherous the journey."

== Crew ==
- Directed and Written by Maureen Marovitch and David Finch
- Produced by Ina Finchman
- A Maximage Production

== Follow-up ==
13 years later, in 2007, Marovitch and Finch came out with a follow-up to the original Longshots in the same basic concept: Still Longshots. It aired on APTN and Global Television and was well received. It was produced by their own company Picture This Productions, since Maximage has shut down after the original Longshots was made.
