= Crook as Rookwood =

Book by Chris Nyst

- Author: Chris Nyst
- Language: English
- Genre: Novel
- Publisher: HarperCollins, Sydney
- Publication date: 2005
- Publication place: Australia
- Media type: Print Paperback
- Pages: 458 pp
- ISBN: 0-7322-6637-8
- OCLC: 62545546
- Preceded by: Gone
- Followed by: Millen

Crook as Rookwood is a 2005 Ned Kelly Award-winning novel by the Australian author Chris Nyst.

== Awards ==
- Ned Kelly Awards for Crime Writing, Best Novel, 2006: joint winner

== Notes ==
- Dedication: "To my beautiful sons and my darling daughters".
- Peter Rozovsky, of the "Detectives Beyond Borders" weblog, listed this as one of his favorite crime novels of 2007.

== Critical reception ==
On the AustCrime website reviewer Sunnie Gil noted: "Chris Nyst is a keen observer of personalities and creates memorable characters. He also has a feel for writing dialogue which is witty and sounds authentic. A defence lawyer, based on Queensland's Gold Coast, Nyst's clients have ranged from high-ranking politicians and sporting identities to a notorious hit-man and petty criminals. He knows the legal system and how it works. He also knows criminals. He knows how they think and how they speak."

== See also ==
- 2005 in Australian literature
