= Picture This Productions =

Picture This Productions is a Montreal-based film and television production company founded in 1996 by Maureen Marovitch and her partner David Finch. They started their collaboration directing their first documentary Longhots in 1993. Picture This mainly produces original factual series, documentaries and fiction films, but also works with outside producers on co-production projects. Picture This also has a corporate division that produces web-destined video content for educational, institutional, and NGO clients.

== Productions ==
Picture This Productions' principals Maureen Marovitch and David Finch have produced and/or directed feature documentaries, documentary series, drama and comedy, performances, historical biographies and other television content for networks such as CTV, Global, CBC, TLC, History Channel, CBC News Network and APTN. Their productions have aired on PBS in the US, ABC in Australia, and other TV networks around the world.

A selected filmography:

- Longshots (TV documentary, 1994)
- Backroads (TV documentary, 1996)
- La Bolduc (TV biographical documentary, 1998)
- Louis Cyr: The Father of Strength (TV biographical documentary, 1999)
- Jay Silverheels, the Man Beside the Mask (TV biographical documentary, 2000)
- Judith Jasmin, une journaliste engagée (TV biographical documentary, 2000)
- Cul de sac (TV drama, 2000)
- Ahmed and the Hungry Heifer (comedy short, 2001)
- When Two Won't Do (feature documentary, 2001)
- Redeemable in Merchandise (comedy short, 2003)
- Once Upon a Journey (TV documentary, 2003)
- Still Longshots (TV documentary, 2007 - follow-up to Longshots)
- A Modern Castle (TV documentary, 2011)
- The Invisible Red Thread (TV documentary, 2012)
- Watchers of the North (TV Series, 2013)
- Drawing Blank (performance short, 2014)
- Seen & Heard (web series, 2018)
- Arm Nation (TV doc series, 2018)
- Warrior Up! (TV doc series, 2024)

Note: The original Longshots was produced by Ina Fichman, principal at les productions Maximage. Picture This retrieved the rights for this film some years later and produced the follow-up, Still Longshots.

== Staff ==
- Maureen Marovitch: Creative Director
- David Finch: Senior Producer and Director
- Jonathan Viens: Director of Post Production
- Benoît Dery: Director of Photography
- Emilio Ruiloba Roy : Video Editor & Post-Production Services
- Eva Tanoni : Assistant Producer
