= After Dinner =

1988 play by Andrew Bovell

- Author: Andrew Bovell
- Cover artist: Emma Vine
- Language: English
- Genre: Play
- Publisher: Currency Press
- Publication date: 1988
- Publication place: Australia
- Media type: Print (Paperback)
- ISBN: 978-0-86819-518-6

After Dinner is a play by Australian playwright Andrew Bovell. It was Bovell's first play, written in 1984, when he lived in Carlton, Melbourne.

After Dinner was first performed at La Mama Theatre in 1988, and went on to be performed throughout Australia.

It is still regularly performed.

== Plot ==
An acutely observed but tender-hearted account of relationships and behaviour in a suburban pub bistro on a Friday night.

== First Production ==
After Dinner was first performed at La Mama Theatre, Melbourne, on 20 April 1988 with the following cast and crew:

=== Cast ===
- Tom Gutteridge as Gordon
- Kim Trengove as Dympie
- Eugenia Fragos as Paula
- Leigh Morgan as Monika
- Peter Murphy as Stephen

=== Crew ===
- Director: Kim Durban
- Designer: Amanda Johnson
- Stage Manager: Jane Allen
- Music: Tom Gillick and The Heartbreaks
