= Genevieve Hegney =

Australian actress, playwright and producer

- Education: National Institute of Dramatic Art (1999)
- Occupations: Actress; playwright; producer
- Years active: 1999–present
- Known for: Colin from Accounts
- Awards: AWGIE Award (2013); Equity Ensemble Award (2023, 2025)

Genevieve Hegney is an Australian actress, playwright and producer. She is best known for her role as Chiara in the comedy series Colin from Accounts, for which she won a 2023 Equity Ensemble Award and received a 2025 AACTA Award nomination for Best Acting in a Comedy, having also won a second Equity Ensemble Award in 2025.

Her television credits include In Our Blood, Pieces of Her, Young Rock and All Her Fault, with film appearances in The Little Death and Devil's Dust. She is also a playwright, co-creating and starring in the ensemble theatre productions Unqualified and Fly Girl with collaborator Catherine Moore. Fly Girl sold out. She also won a 2013 AWGIE Award from the Australian Writers Guild (shared with co-writer Matthew Moore) for the short film The Amber Amulet.

Hegney graduated from the National Institute of Dramatic Art (NIDA) in 1999 and has extensive theatre experience, including work with the Bell Shakespeare Company. Beyond acting, she has served as Head Acting Coach on Home and Away for over a decade, and has produced and written numerous award-winning projects.

She was raised in Girrawheen, Western Australia and originally planned to be a schoolteacher.
