= Chris Nyst =

Australian writer

- Born: November 1953 (age 72–73); Blackall, Queensland, Australia
- Education: Law Degree (University of Queensland)
- Occupation: Novelist
- Writing career
- Genre: Crime fiction

Chris Nyst (born November 1953) is an Australian solicitor and crime fiction writer.

== Legal career ==
Nyst attended the University of Queensland and was awarded a Law Degree and in 1977 he was admitted as a solicitor in the Queensland Supreme Court. In 2001, Nyst resigned as a senior partner with the International Minter Ellison Legal Group to become the founding principal of the litigation firm Nyst Lawyers, now renamed Nyst Legal.

He is an adjunct professor of law with the Griffith University, and is a past President of the Gold Coast Law Association. "He has also been a visiting lecturer in Criminal Law, Advocacy and Entertainment Law at the Queensland University of Technology and Bond University".

He has been admitted to practice in other jurisdictions including the supreme Courts of Victoria, New South Wales and Tasmania as a Barrister and Solicitor. He is also a practitioner of the High Court of Australia.

He is a senior member of the International Commission of Jurists and was a special adviser to the UN investigation into human rights violations in East Timor. He is a co-founder with Lynne Weathered and Jason Murakami and a current member of the Griffith University Innocence Project.

== Writing and film career ==
In 1999, Chris Nyst turned his hand to fiction writing his first novel Cop This! His second novel Gone was short-listed for the Queensland Premier's Literary Awards and his third novel Crook as Rookwood won the 2006 Ned Kelly Award, Australia's leading accolade for crime fiction.

Nyst launched his career in film with the acclaimed Australian movie Gettin’ Square, starring David Wenham and Sam Worthington, which he wrote and co-produced. The film won Chris the 2003 Lexus IF Award for Best Script and won David Wenham the Best Actor award at the AFI Awards, the Critic's Circle Awards, the Lexus IF Awards and the Australian Comedy Awards.

In 2006, Nyst established his own production company Nyst Entertainment and Carbon Studio, which produced the 2007 feature film Crooked Business. He wrote and directed the film, which was released nationally in 2008.

In 2009 Nyst was appointed as a Director to the Board of Screen Queensland. During his career he has represented several high-profile clients including Brenden Abbott, Pauline Hanson and Bernard Tomic.

== Personal life ==
Nyst was born in the central western town of Blackall in Queensland to parents Edmond and Teresa. He had two older brothers Phillip and Malcolm and his childhood was spent on a farm near Ipswich. He is married to Julie and has four children, two daughters Carly and Annabelle and two sons Brendan and Jonathan who work in his legal practice.

== Legal issues ==
In June 2016, Chris Nyst's legal firm was dragged into a criminal case that involved two former employees of his law firm, Nyst Legal. The two former employees were charged with "conducting transactions to avoid reporting requirements and perverting the course of justice". It was alleged that the pair of former employees were engaged in "stacking" which involved conduct intended to avoid transactions being reported to the Federal Government’s financial intelligence unit.

Chris Nyst and his son Brendan filed a defamation claim in the Queensland District Court on 7 August 2020. They claimed that a 22 year old Brisbane man has defamed them by leaving a Google review about Nyst Legal, the law firm they are both directors of. According to the claim filed with the Court, the review contained no text and was a "one-star rating". They alleged that the review was defamatory because it implied Nyst Legal "provide poor service and should be avoided, are unprofessional, inept and the quality of work they produce is poor".

== Awards and nominations ==
=== Films ===
- Winner Lexus IF Award for Best Script, 2003 for Gettin' Square
- Nominated Film Critics Circle of Australia (FCAA) Awards, Best Screenplay Original, 2003: for Gettin' Square
- Nominated Australian Film Institute (AFI) Awards, Best Original Screenplay, 2003: nominated for Gettin' Square
- Shortlisted New South Wales Premier's Literary Awards, Script Writing Award, 2004: for Gettin' Square

=== Books ===
- Joint winner Ned Kelly Awards for Crime Writing, Best Novel, 2006: for Crook as Rookwood

== Bibliography ==
=== Novels ===
- Cop This! (1999)
- Gone (2000)
- Crook as Rookwood (2005)

=== Screenplays ===
- Gettin' Square (2003)
- Crooked Business (2008)
