= The Standard of Perfection: Show Cats =

- DVD cover
- Directed by: Mark Lewis
- Country of origin: United States
- Original language: English

Production
- Producers: Mark Lewis; Ben McNeill
- Editor: Robert DeMaio
- Running time: 90 minutes
- Production company: Radio Pictures

Original release
- Release: April 19, 2006

The Standard of Perfection: Show Cats is a 2006 American documentary television film directed by Mark Lewis about the lives of show cats and their owners.

== Synopsis ==
Filmed at the 2004 Cat Fanciers' Association International Cat Show, in Houston, Texas and in other locations in Houston, filmmaker Mark Lewis gives viewers a comedic look inside the world of cat owners and cat shows, sharing the idiosyncrasies of owners who name cats after celebrities and who sometimes treat their cats better than family members. Some of the cats featured in the documentary were named after Jacqueline Kennedy, George W. Bush, Candice Bergen, Nicole Kidman, Colin Powell (the cat actually met his namesake), Wolf Blitzer, Monica Lewinsky (the cat was referred to as "Ms. Lewinsky"), and Spider-Man. There were others by other names that were owned by other people featured in the documentary, but they were not focused on as much as the celebrity-named ones listed here.

== Reception ==
Anita Gates of The New York Times described The Standard of Perfection: Show Cats as "a pleasant if slightly mean-spirited hour on PBS stations" where cats live up to their reputations as "haughty, arrogant" pets. Gates said that the documentary reminded her of the 2000 mockumentary Best in Show with similarities in the owners' eccentricity. She noted the documentary's most interesting moment as a freaked-out cat in competition jumping into an audience. She concluded, "'Show Cats' is all about watching beautiful, fastidiously groomed animals looking their best for the cameras and the judges."

Ranny Green of The Seattle Times writes that "Mark Lewis' Show Cats is a compelling mix of expressive close-ups from the giant show hall to the tiny playroom at home, plus revealing interviews with owners and judges." He adds, "Lewis captures a buoyant, playful camaraderie as competitors get ready." He says that "Show Cats gets a silver for entertainment and education, while appearing a bit too formulaic."

== See also ==
- List of individual cats
