= Show cat =

Cat entered into a cat show

A show cat (also known as a purebred cat or pedigreed cat) is one that has been judged to be close to the physical ideal for its breed standard at a cat show. Not all pedigreed cats are show cats, many are just pets but the ones with the best conformation and personality are often shown in associations such as the CFA and TICA in the US, the GCCF in the UK or the FiFe in the rest of Europe. Uncommonly, a prize-winning pedigreed show cat can be worth thousands of dollars but most are loved pets. In order to compare examples of breeds and improve stock, cat shows are held where judges evaluate the cats according to a breed standard. Pedigreed cats are often identified with microchip implants.

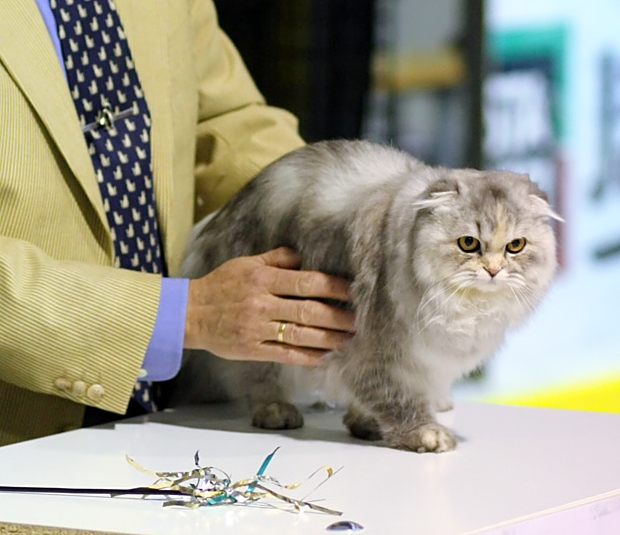
A Highland Fold cat in a cat show

== Issues ==
=== Health ===
A common conception is that all pedigreed cats are less healthy than random-bred cats due to inbreeding. “The Ascent of Cat Breeds: Genetic Evaluations of Breeds and Worldwide Random-bred Populations,” by Lipinski et al., showed that pedigreed cats are more inbred than random bred cats. For some breeds such as Singapura and Burmese the genetic diversity is very low. Some breeders take great care to select for the healthiest animals, and this has the potential to reduce the incidence of health issues. An example of this is blindness in the Abyssinian caused by PRA, which have been reduced from 45% to less than 4% in 2008. Many of the worst, like PKD in Persians, Hip Dysplasia in British Shorthairs and Maine Coons, HCM in Maine Coons, Persians, Exotic Shorthair, British Shorthair, Norwegian Forest Cat, Ragdoll and Bengal, are still present in high frequencies. The frequency of HCM in British Shorthairs are 2.1% for females and 20.4% for males. The frequency of Hip Dysplasia in Maine Coons is 36.3% or 30.2%. Some breeders use preventive screening, but no studies documenting possible reductions in prevalences exists.

=== Breeding ===
Generally, breeds are established using few cats as founders and outcrossing is mostly not allowed. It is also normal that breeds go through population bottlenecks because of the popular sire syndrome. It is quite normal that cats winning in shows are found attractive to breeders and these cats end up being overused and eventually they are present many or perhaps all pedigrees many times. This population structure is addressed in Patterns of molecular genetic variation among cat breeds. "As a consequence of small effective population sizes, founder effects, and population bottlenecks, cat breeds have become repositories of spontaneous mutations causative of hereditary disease." One example is the presence of the mutation R820W, which causes hypertrophic cardiomyopathy (HCM), in 30% of all Ragdolls.

Breeds have different origins: some are manmade or the result of mutation, while others are found in nature. Some breeds of cat have been created by taking a single tom cat or queen with an unusual physical characteristic that breeds true. The entire Cornish Rex breed can be traced back to a single parent animal with an unusual genetic mutation producing a curly coat. Both the Burmese and Tonkinese breeds can be traced back to a single cat, Wong Mau, which was brought from Burma in the 1930s. Breeders continually strive to eliminate negative characteristics that various cat breeds exhibit as the breeds are developed. There is not really any such thing as a 'purebred' cat since all registered breeds began as random-bred cats. In this case, 'pedigreed' is a more accurate term.

=== Meeting breed standards ===
Cat breeders are continually competing to find the 'ideal' of the breed – the cats that come closest to fitting the breed standard. Because of this, the physical characteristics of a prize-winning show cat have gradually changed in some breeds. This genetic shifting is most obvious in the two oldest, most popular and most distinctive breeds of show cat - the Persian and the Siamese. However, some show cats are naturally occurring breeds that are perpetuated to keep the original look of a cat from a particular region. Examples are the Maine Coon and Turkish Van.

== See also ==
- List of cat breeds
- List of individual cats
- Supreme Cat Show
- Show Cats: The Standard of Perfection, a 2004 documentary about show cats.
