= Tas Pappas =

Australian skateboarder

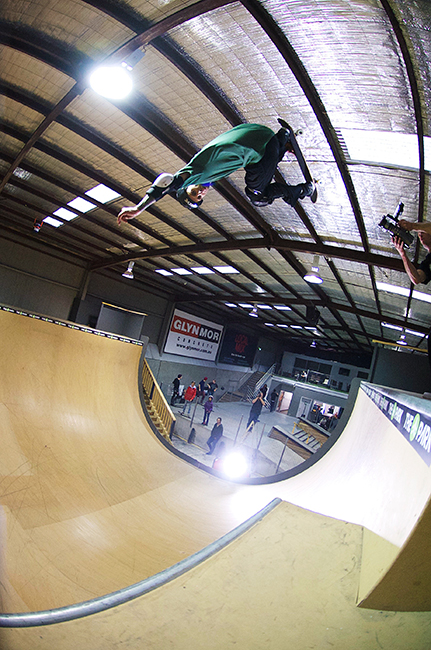
- Born: Tasou Micah Pappas; 9 February 1975 (age 51); Melbourne, Victoria, Australia
- Occupation: Professional skateboarder
- Children: 3

Tasou Micah Pappas (born 1975), better known as Tas Pappas, is an Australian sponsored skateboarder. He was previously a professional skateboarder, primarily in the discipline of vert skateboarding, and competed in a number of major international events. During the 1990s, he and brother Ben Pappas were highly regarded skateboarders on a global scale, reaching the top two places in the world rankings.

== Early life ==
Pappas was born in 1975 in Melbourne, Victoria and grew up in the north-western suburb of St Albans. He and brother Ben were the only children of a Greek-Australian father, who worked for a finance company, and an Australian mother who was a caterer—the parents eventually separated after marrying at a young age.

Tas Pappas described a chaotic home environment in 2014:

The family was very dysfunctional ... We were hurting as kids from a lot of the fights we saw ... I always felt like I just wanted to get out of where I lived. I wanted to prove myself. I ended up having what felt like a chip on my shoulder because of it all. I just wanted to get to America and become something.

Pappas became fascinated with skateboarding at the age of 12 years after watching touring American professionals perform at the Prahran skate park. He then visited the United States (US) for the first time three years later, before relocating to the US at the age of 17 years after he dropped out of Kings Park High School. Pappas' first residence was with other skateboarders in Tampa, Florida.

== Professional skateboarding ==
=== Mad Circle ===
In a 1994 advertisement for the now-defunct Mad Circle skateboard deck company, an x-ray of Pappas' femur complete with metal plates and screws, is depicted with the tagline: "Tas Pappas, Mad Circle's Answer to the Bionic Man." Pappas then appeared alongside Moses Itkonen, Edward Devera, Mike Cao, Justin Girard and Scott Johnston in the 1996 Mad Circle video Let The Horns Blow.

Pappas won the 1996 World Championships skateboard contest over Tony Hawk that led to his world number-one ranking—he won with a broken rib sustained earlier in the contest. Pappas explained that he was "humbled" soon afterward, as he subsequently broke his back. Both the Pappas brothers then found that they were unable to gain favour with the American skateboard industry due to their attitudes, which were considered abrasive and wild. Australian filmmaker Eddie Martin, who knew the Pappas brothers as teenagers skateboarding at Prahran skate park, explained in 2014: "They’re [Pappas brothers] very Australian characters. They were so raw and full of passion. They just went over there and stuck it to them. It just didn’t go down very well."

In 1999, Pappas' brother Ben was intercepted by law enforcement while attempting to smuggle cocaine into Australia and, in addition to a prison term, his passport was confiscated for a three-year period and he was unable to continue his skateboarding career in the US.

=== Revolution Graphite Skateboards (RevDeck) ===
In 2005, Revolution Graphite Skateboards (RevDeck) announced the release of a new skateboard deck, co-designed and tested by Pappas (he was also sponsored by DVS Shoes at this time). As of 2014, Pappas is associated with the company, according to the "About" section of the website; however, in August 2014, the website's home page stated that the company is manufacturing certain skateboard deck products for a limited period of time.

=== US incarceration ===
In 2005, Pappas married Colleen, an American he met through skateboarding. They lived in San Diego with their two children. However, due to financial difficulties, the relationship was strained and Pappas began using crystal methamphetamine, to numb the pain from injuries during contests that he desperately participated in to earn money. Additionally, Pappas was prescribed an antidepressant after he consulted a doctor for help with a low emotional state caused by his life situation—Pappas proceeded to use alcohol and cocaine with the medication.

Pappas explained in 2014 that his drug use at the time led to paranoia about his wife being involved in an extramarital relationship and during an argument he physically assaulted Colleen. Pappas said: "I was paranoid that she was on with someone ... I don't agree with what I did, but I ended up hitting her and losing the plot and went to jail." Pappas' actions resulted in a two-month prison term and he was eventually deported after he was found in a drug-related car crash during his corresponding parole period. While in detention, awaiting to be flown to Australia, Pappas received a telephone call from his father to inform him that Ben Pappas was dead, a moment that Pappas described as "the saddest thing I've ever heard."

=== Australian incarceration ===
Following his return to Australia in 2007, Pappas began drinking alcohol heavily and his father died of a heart attack the following year. Also in 2008, Pappas flew to South America in an attempt to procure cocaine to smuggle into Australia so that he could pay off a drug debt. Pappas, who attempted to smuggle the drug in three skateboard decks while intoxicated on benzodiazepines, alcohol and amphetamines, was intercepted at Sydney Airport after the traces of cocaine on his clothing alerted authorities. Pappas was consequently imprisoned for three years in various New South Wales facilities.

In November 2011, Pappas was afforded the privilege of prison day-release on weekends and used this time to skate the vert ramp in Albury, New South Wales. In December 2011, after internet blogs reported Pappas' Albury visits, SLAM Skateboarding Magazine ran a feature on Pappas and suggested that, at the time, he remained one of the most highly skilled skateboarders in Australia. The video footage that SLAM published to coincide with the article revealed that the session was Pappas' "third skate in 3 years" due to his incarceration—the video was filmed by Stewart.

=== Return to skateboarding ===
Following his incarceration, Pappas was drawn to the tenets of Christianity as a central part of his recovery from drug use, having read the Bible during his sentence. He also continued to develop his marriage with Helen Norman, whom he raises a son with, and he resumed skateboarding.

Cliché Skateboards, through Dwindle Distribution, released a Tas Pappas "guest board" in January 2013, with graphics by renowned skateboarding graphic designer, Marc McKee. The design is set to be representative of Pappas' life and new outlook, with a deity figure reaching down and exalting Pappas from a burning environment in which items such as handcuffs and a syringe are present. Footage of Pappas, skateboarding primarily at the Prahran ramp in Melbourne, Australia, accompanied the release of the product. Morgan Campbell, online content manager for Skateboarding Australia, the country's government-funded peak body, stated:

Tas has truly put the board into orbit with this stupendous video part which contains some of the best vert skating we have seen from anyone in eons. The graphic was done by Mr Marc Mckee, so you can be sure that collectors snap it up all over the globe. So good to see you back in the skies above Prahran Tas. The clip is by Greg Stewart, who happens to be known in the UK as "The Talking Filmer". Gregsie: we are all delighted to once again hear your mid-air commentary. Just incase you missed it, in 2011 Tas was given the Video Vault treatment for his epic Mad Circle part from almost 20 years ago.

In April 2014, Pappas became the 12th skateboarder and first Australian in history to complete a 900-degree rotation. The achievement occurred on the Anzac Day holiday at a newly built facility on Phillip Island, Victoria, Australia called the "Megaranch".

=== Sponsors ===
As of August 2014, Pappas is sponsored by Theeve Trucks, a company founded and managed by fellow Australian vert skateboarder Trevor Ward.

== Contest history ==
In 1996, Pappas won both titles at the Hard Rock Cafe Skateboarding World Championships (the finals event, as well as points accumulation for the entire year), beating Tony Hawk. Soon after, Pappas suffered a number of serious injuries and was unable to compete or maintain the level at which he had been skateboarding prior to the mishaps. In 1999, following physical rehabilitation for his injuries, Pappas placed highly in a string of events, including the X Games and the Milwaukee Triple Crown.

On 28 October 2006, Pappas won the vert skateboarding event at the LG Action Sports World Championship, beating Brazilian professional Sandro Dias in a tiebreaker (Andy MacDonald finished in third place). During Pappas' winning run, in which he is riding a RevDeck skateboard deck, he executes a 720-degree rotation; described as "flawless" by one of the competition's commentators, Pappas completed the run without making a single error.

== Recognition and influence ==
Following Pappas's success with the Hard Rock Cafe competition, both he and his brother were credited with helping to revive the popularity of vert skateboarding, which was beginning to fade. In August 2011, Tas and Ben Pappas both received the number 10 ranking in Transworld Skateboarding's "10 Infamous Australians" article for "rekindl[ing] vert's flickering candle" during the 1990s.

== All This Mayhem ==
In May 2012, Pappas attended the Melbourne premiere of Danny Way's documentary Waiting for Lightning, where he was photographed alongside Way and fellow Australian vert professional Dom Kekich. In an interview at the premiere, Pappas confirmed he was in the process of producing a documentary of his own, focused on his career and that of his late brother. A filmmaker approached the Pappas family about making a documentary, but the family did not give their authority as Pappas would not be included in the filmmaking process.

The family approved a documentary backed by Screen Australia. It was directed and produced by Eddie Martin, James Gay-Rees and George Pank co-produced the film, and Chris King was the editor. Gay-Rees and King had previously worked together on the award-winning documentaries Senna and Exit Through the Gift Shop.

The documentary began production in 2010, as footage of the Pappas brothers was sourced from friends and filmmakers. Tony Hawk declined an offer to be interviewed for the film. According to a 2011 Screen Australia media release, The Pappas Brothers tells the story of Tas and Ben Pappas and their rise to skateboarding prominence. The documentary was released as All This Mayhem and the world premiere was at the Adelaide Film Festival in October 2013. The documentary received additional backing from the Adelaide Film Festival, Deluxe Sydney, and Hopscotch Films, and is sold by Eone Films and Cinetic Media.

Martin explained prior to the release of the documentary:

It's a story about two brothers that just happen to be in the world of skateboarding. People can get so easily put off and I think that the skateboarding element will be our biggest challenge. We didn’t want to use a skate image as our promo because obviously, for us, this isn’t a story about skateboarding.

Martin further explained: "The film is to be distributed by Hopscotch in Australia. We are hoping the film will play at some festivals before a national Australian release. To get an overseas sale would be our main goal."

The documentary screened at the Sydney Film Festival on 5 June 2014 and was then generally released in Australia through Melbourne's Cinema Nova and Dendy Newtown in Sydney. During promotional interviews during the film's release period, Martin described the Pappas' story as a "Greek tragedy".

== Personal life ==
As of May 2014, Pappas resides in the inner north-eastern Melbourne, Australia suburb of Clifton Hill, where he shares a home with Helen and their five-year-old son Billy. Pappas is employed as an abseiling window cleaner and attends a Christian church for mass.

In May 2014, Pappas revealed in an interview that he had been diagnosed with borderline personality disorder in connection with his experience of sexual abuse as a young child. His self-destructive behaviour was identified as a manifestation of the disorder. In regard to the personal life recovery process that he was continuing with at the time of the interview, Pappas stated:

"Everything had to happen for me to learn ... Dad had to die, Ben had to die, I had to lose my kids. I had to be humbled. I was too angry and I had to be crippled and put on my knees to finally realise I'm not in charge."

In a July 2014 interview with the Australian Broadcasting Corporation (ABC), Pappas described himself as "a work in progress" and said "I'll take ownership for all my shit actions".

== Timeline ==
1991 – Australian Amateur titles in late 1991 at Darling Harbour
1993 – Pappas' first US competition in Tampa, Florida
1994 – 7 August Pappas competed in Munster Monster Mastership Germany, coming 4th
1995 – Triple crown in Las Vegas
1995 – Came 3rd in Slam City Jam vert competition
1996 – Came 3rd in X Games after Andy MacDonald (1) and Tony Hawk (2) – Providence & Newport, Rhode Island
1996 – Tas won 1996 Triple Crown finals, in which Pappas edged past Tony Hawk after one amazing run.
1996 – Tas #1 ranked Vert skateboarder worldwide
1997 – Vancouver Slam City Jam, coming 10th
1997 – Pappas finishes 44th in World Cup of Skateboarding
1997 – Pappas Wins LG competition in Las Vegas
1997 or 98 – Demo in Switzerland
1998 – Pappas finishes 39th in World Cup of Skateboarding
1998 – Pappas comes twelfth in B3 Vert, Beaverton, Oregon
1999 – May – Pappas finishes in 22nd position in Vancouver Slam City Jam
1999 – June – Pappas finishes 8th in Vans Hardcore Triple Crown in Milwaukee
1999 – July – Pappas finishes 7th in Radlands in Northampton UK
1999 – 9–11 July Pappas came 2nd in Munster Monster Mastership Germany
1999 – 16–18 July Pappas comes 2nd in Prague
1999 – 28 August – Pappas comes 1st in vert competition at the B3 in Beaverton, Oregon
2001 – (17–22 August 2001) Pappas comes 3rd in X-Games in Philadelphia
2003 – Cincinnati
2003 – Pomona – Pappas gets injured from Vert ramp fall
2003 – Washington
2003 – 11–13 July Armegeddon Cup Skateboarding Event Birmingham, UK – Pappas comes 2nd
2004 – Beijing LG tour
2004 – Cincinnati
2004 – Dulles, VA
2004 – Pomona
2004 – Sacramento
2004 – Shanghai LG tour
2004 – Cleveland, OH – Summer Gravity Games (15-19 Sept.) Tas (6th in Vert, 5th in Vert Best Trick)
2005 – Cincinnati
2005 – Manchester
2005 – Moscow
2005 – Pomona, CA
2005 – Sacramento ASA
2006 – Birmingham, UK
2006 – Amsterdam
2006 – Berlin
2006 – Dallas (Pappas won)
2006 – Paris
2006 – Richmond
2006 – San Diego
2006 – Amsterdam (Pappas came in 1st place in LG Action Sports World Tour competition)
2006 – Birmingham, UK (Pappas came in 3rd place in LG Action Sports World Tour competition)
2006 – Dallas – (Pappas came in 1st place in LG Action Sports World Tour competition)
2006 – Richmond – (Pappas came in 2nd place in LG Action Sports World Tour competition)
2006 – San Diego – (Pappas came in ? place in LG Action Sports World Tour competition)
2006 – Portland – Dew Action Sports Tour Vans Invitational – Pappas finishes in 9th position
2006 – Orlando – Dew Tour – Pappas comes 2nd in Vert competition
2007 or 2008 – Pappas at Globe World Cup in Melbourne, Australia

== Videography ==
- 411VM: Issue 2 (1993)
- 411VM: Issue 5 (1994)
- 411VM: Best of 411, Volume 1 (1994)
- XYZ: Stars und Bars (1995)
- Mad Circle: Let The Horns Blow (1996)
- Las Vegas Pro Vert '96 (1996)
- Genie of the Lamp (1998)
- Globe: World Cup Skateboarding 2005 (2005)
