= The Babadook =

2014 film by Jennifer Kent

- Theatrical release poster
- Directed by: Jennifer Kent
- Written by: Jennifer Kent
- Based on: Monster by Jennifer Kent
- Produced by: Kristina Ceyton; Kristian Moliere
- Starring: Essie Davis; Noah Wiseman; Hayley McElhinney; Daniel Henshall; Barbara West; Ben Winspear
- Cinematography: Radek Ładczuk
- Edited by: Simon Njoo
- Music by: Jed Kurzel
- Production companies: Screen Australia; Causeway Films; South Australian Film Corporation; Smoking Gun Productions; Entertainment One
- Distributed by: Umbrella Entertainment
- Release dates: 17 January 2014 (Sundance); 22 May 2014 (Australia)
- Running time: 94 minutes
- Country: Australia
- Language: English
- Budget: $2 million
- Box office: $10.7 million

The Babadook is a 2014 Australian psychological horror film written and directed by Jennifer Kent in her feature directorial debut, based on her 2005 short film Monster. Starring Essie Davis, Noah Wiseman, Daniel Henshall, Hayley McElhinney, Barbara West, and Ben Winspear, the film follows a widowed single mother who, with her son, must confront a mysterious humanoid monster in their home.

Kent began writing the screenplay in 2009, intending to explore parenting, grief, and the fear of madness. Financing was secured through Australian government grants and partly through crowdfunding. Filming took place in Adelaide, where Kent drew from her experiences as a production assistant on Lars von Trier's Dogville (2003). During filming, the production team worked to ensure six-year-old Wiseman was protected from the film's disturbing subject matter.

The Babadook premiered at the Sundance Film Festival on 17 January 2014 and was given a limited release in Australian cinemas on 22 May 2014, initially failing to become a commercial success in its native country. However, it generated wider attention internationally, grossing $10 million against its $2 million budget. The film was praised for the cast's performances, creature design, premise, and themes. At the 4th AACTA Awards, it won for Best Film, and Kent won for Best Direction and Best Original Screenplay, respectively. In the years since its release, The Babadook has become a cult classic.

== Plot ==
Amelia Vanek is a troubled, exhausted widow and single mother of six-year-old Sam living in Adelaide. Her husband, Oskar, was killed in a car accident while driving her to the hospital during labour. Sam begins displaying erratic behaviour, causing problems at school and in their social life, and becomes preoccupied with an imaginary monster, which he has built weapons to fight. One night, he asks his mother to read a pop-up fairy tale book, titled Mister Babadook. It describes a monster with a top hat wearing a suit, which grows more sinister and menacing with each page turned. Amelia is disturbed by the book and its mysterious appearance, while Sam grows frightened and paranoid, convinced that the Babadook is real.

Strange events begin to occur, such as Amelia finding glass shards in her food. She attributes the events to Sam, but he blames the Babadook. Amelia subsequently rips up the book and disposes of it. At her birthday party, Sam's cousin, Ruby, bullies him, and he pushes her out of her tree house, inadvertently breaking her nose. Amelia's sister and Ruby's mother, Claire, is furious at her nephew for what he did to her. Claire admonishes her sister, stating that even Amelia resents her son for his behavior. On the ride home, Sam has a vision of the Babadook and suffers a violent seizure, after which Amelia brings him to therapy and receives sedatives for him.

Amelia finds the Mister Babadook book reassembled at their front door. New words in it taunt her; the book now contains pop-ups of her killing their dog Bugsy, Sam, then herself. Terrified, she burns the book and runs to the police station after a disturbing phone call. However, she has no proof, and leaves when she sees what looks like the Babadook's suit hung up behind the front desk.

That night, the Babadook attacks her. After the attack, Amelia becomes more isolated and impatient, angrily shouting at Sam and having more visions of the Babadook. She also exhibits violent behaviour, including cutting the phone line with a knife, and has disturbing hallucinations in which she sees herself murdering Sam.

An apparition of Oskar appears, offering to return if she "brings the boy" to him. Realising he is a creation of the Babadook, she flees, but the Babadook finally possesses her. Under its influence, she kills Bugsy and attempts to kill Sam. Eventually luring her into the basement, Sam knocks her out with his contraptions. Amelia awakens and tries to strangle Sam. When he lovingly caresses her face, she regurgitates a black substance, which seemingly expels the Babadook. However, Sam reminds her that "you can't get rid of the Babadook", and an unseen force drags him into her bedroom. She saves him but is forced to see a vision of her husband's death. Furious, she confronts the Babadook, making it retreat into the basement, locking the door in the process.

Amelia and Sam manage to recover. She is attentive and caring toward him, encouraging him to build his weapons and being impressed by his magic tricks. In the garden, they gather worms in a bowl, which Amelia takes to the basement. The Babadook tries to attack her, but she soothes it and it retreats to the corner, taking the bowl of worms with it. She returns to the yard to celebrate Sam's birthday.

== Cast ==
- Essie Davis as Amelia Vanek, the main character of the movie and Sam's mother.
- Noah Wiseman as Samuel "Sam" Vanek, Amelia's son who has a vision of the Babadook.
- Hayley McElhinney as Claire, Amelia's sister, Sam's aunt, and Ruby's mother.
- Daniel Henshall as Robbie
- Barbara West as Gracie Roach
- Ben Winspear as Oskar Vanek
- Chloe Hurn as Ruby, Amelia's niece, Sam's cousin, and Claire's daughter. She has her nose broken after Sam pushed her on her birthday.
- Jacquy Phillips as Beverly
- Bridget Walters as Norma
- Craig Behenna as Warren Newton
- Cathy Adamek as Prue Flannery
- Tim Purcell as the Babadook, the main villain of the movie who possesses Amelia.
- Hachi as Bugsy

== Production ==
=== Development ===
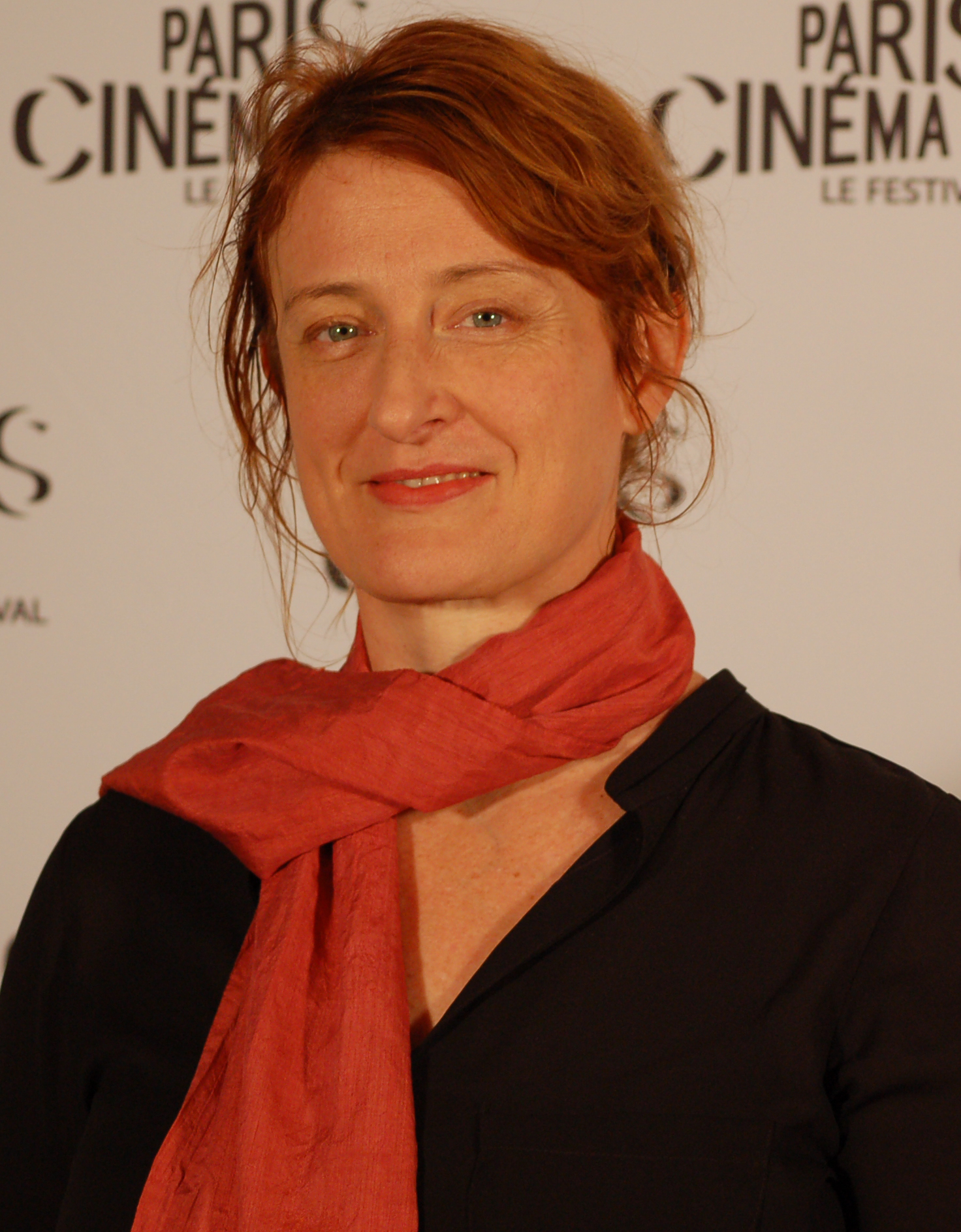
Writer and director Jennifer Kent

Jennifer Kent attended the National Institute of Dramatic Art (NIDA), where she studied acting alongside Essie Davis and graduated in 1991. She then worked primarily as an actor in the film industry for over two decades. She eventually lost her passion for acting by the end of the 1990s and sent a written proposal to Danish filmmaker Lars von Trier, asking if she could assist on the film set of his 2003 drama film Dogville to learn from him. He accepted her proposal, and she considers the experience her "film school", citing the importance of stubbornness as the key lesson she learned.

Prior to The Babadook, Kent completed a short film Monster and an episode of the television series Two Twisted. She explained in May 2014 that the origins of The Babadook could be found in Monster, which she calls "baby Babadook".

She began writing the screenplay in around 2009. She said she sought to tell a story about facing up to the darkness within ourselves, the "fear of going mad", and an exploration of parenting from a "real perspective". Regarding parenting, she further explained in October 2014: "Now, I'm not saying we all want to go and kill our kids, but a lot of women struggle. And it is a very taboo subject, to say that motherhood is anything but a perfect experience for women." About the characters, she said: "It was really important for me that they were loving, and loveable people. I don't mean likeable—I mean that we really felt for them". The term babadook is an invention of Kent's. It is improvised from "babaroga", the Serbo-Croatian word for the boogeyman. She completed five drafts of the script.

Kent drew from her experience on the set of Dogville for the assembling of her production team, as she observed that von Trier was surrounded by a well-known "family of people". Kent sought her own "family of collaborators to work with for the long term." Unable to find all of the suitable people within the Australian film industry, Kent hired Polish director of photography (DOP) Radek Ladczuk, for whom The Babadook was his first-ever English language film, and American illustrator Alexander Juhasz. In terms of influences, Kent cited 1960s, '70s and '80s horror—including Eyes Without a Face (1960), Carnival of Souls (1962), The Texas Chain Saw Massacre (1974), Halloween (1978), The Thing (1982) and The Shining (1980)—as well as Vampyr (1932), Nosferatu (1922) and Let the Right One In (2008).

Although the process was challenging and she was forced to reduce their total budget, producer Kristina Ceyton managed to secure funding of around A$2.5 million from government bodies Screen Australia and the SAFC; however, they still required an additional budget for the construction of the film sets. To attain the funds for the sets, Kent and Causeway Films producer Kristina Ceyton launched a Kickstarter crowdfunding campaign in June 2012, with a target of US$30,000. Their funding goal was reached on 27 September 2012 through pledges from 259 backers raising $30,071. Kent said that the crowdfunding closed a crucial gap in which to cover design and special effects expenses to build a "special visual world".

Casting the child lead for the film involved casting director Nikki Barrett viewing around 500 audition tapes of young boys, before selecting smaller groups and individuals for in-person improvisation. Six-year old Noah Wiseman was selected as a standout, with Kent saying he had a certain innocence about him that older boys did not have, possibly as he is the son of a child psychologist.

=== Filming ===
Filming began in September 2012. It was primarily shot in Adelaide, South Australia, with most of the interior shots filmed on a sound stage in the city; as funding was from the South Australian state government, this was a requirement that Kent needed to meet. However, Kent explained to Den of Geek that she is not patriotic and did not want the film to be "particularly Australian".

I wanted to create a myth in a domestic setting. And even though it happened to be in some strange suburb in Australia somewhere, it could have been anywhere. I guess part of that is creating a world that wasn't particularly Australian ... I'm very happy, actually, that it doesn't feel particularly Australian.

— Director Jennifer Kent on her desire to avoid the clichéd "Australian feel" of the film

Kent claimed in an interview that to contribute to the universality of the film's appearance, a Victorian terrace-style house was specifically built for the film, as there are very few houses designed in such a style in Adelaide. However exterior shots were of an existing terraced house in North Adelaide. A script reading was not done since Noah Wiseman was only six years old at the time, and Kent focused instead on bonding, playing games and lots of time spent with the actors so they could become more familiar with one another. Pre-production occurred in Adelaide and lasted three weeks and, during this time, Kent conveyed a "kiddie" version of the narrative to Wiseman, in which young Samuel is the hero. Kent took Wiseman to Adelaide Zoo to explain the story, and said Wiseman was aware it was a scary film and that he "knew how important his role was".

Kent originally wanted to film solely in black-and-white, as she wanted to create a "heightened feel" that is still believable. She was also influenced by pre-1950s B-grade horror films, as they were "very theatrical", in addition to being "visually beautiful and terrifying". Kent later lost interest in the black-and-white idea and worked closely with production designer Alex Holmes and Radek to create a "very cool", "very claustrophobic" interior environment with "meticulously designed" sets. The film's final colour scheme was achieved without the use of gels on the camera lenses or any alterations during the post-filming stage. Kent cited David Lynch and Roman Polanski as key influences during the filming stage.

Kent described the filming process as "stressful" because of Wiseman's age. She explained, "So I really had to be focused. We needed double the time we had." Wiseman's mother was on set and a "very protective, loving environment" was created. Kent explained after the release of the film that Wiseman was protected throughout the entire project: "During the reverse shots where Amelia was abusing Sam verbally, we had Essie [Davis] yell at an adult stand-in on his knees. I didn't want to destroy a childhood to make this film—that wouldn't be fair." Kent's friendship with Davis was a boon during filming and Kent praised her former classmate in the media: "To her credit, she's [Davis] very receptive, likes to be directed and is a joy to work with."

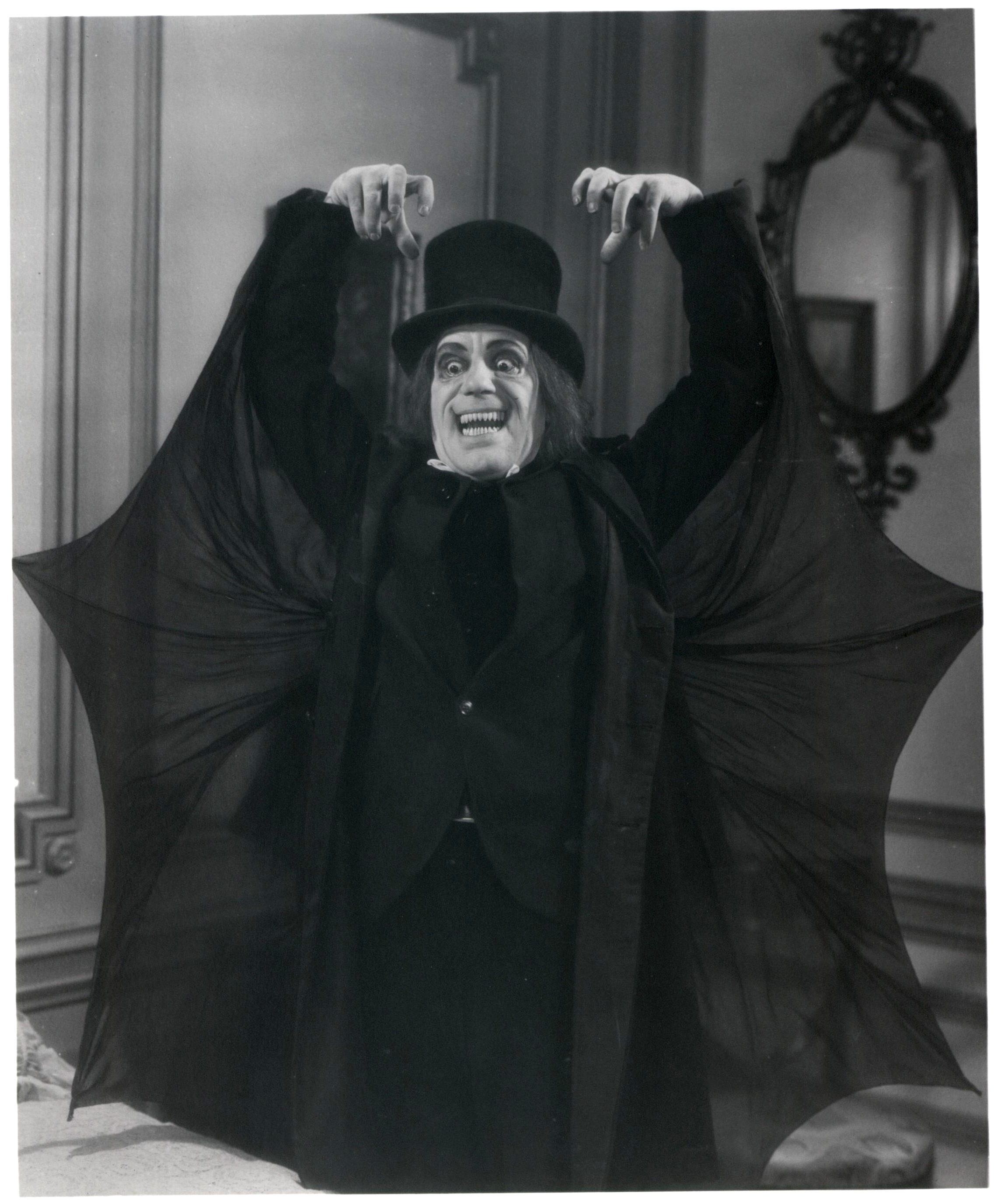
The monster design for the Babadook was inspired by the Man in the Beaver Hat in London After Midnight (1927).

In terms of the Babadook monster and the scary effects of the film, Kent was adamant from the outset of production that a low-fi and handmade approach would be used. She cites the influence of Georges Méliès, Jean Epstein's The Fall of the House of Usher (1928) and Häxan (1922). Kent used stop-motion effects for the monster and a large amount of smoothing was completed in post-production. Kent explained to Empire: "There's been some criticism of the lo-fi approach of the effects, and that makes me laugh because it was always intentional. I wanted the film to be all in camera." She has also said that the Man in the Beaver Hat from the lost 1927 film London After Midnight was an inspiration for the design of the Babadook.

=== Music ===
The soundtrack was composed by Jed Kurzel. The score was officially released for the first time by Waxwork Records in 2017 on "black with red haze" vinyl. The record sleeve features a recreation of the pop-up book from the film.

== Release ==
The film's global premiere was in January 2014 at the Sundance Film Festival. The film then received a limited theatrical release in Australia in May 2014, following a screening in April 2014 at the Stanley Film Festival.

In Singapore, the film was released on 25 September 2014. The film opened in the United Kingdom for general release on 17 October 2014, and in the United States on 28 November 2014. In 2020, amid cinema closures due to the COVID-19 pandemic, The Babadook was one of the films made available for free for screenings by independent cinemas by IFC Films.

A 10th anniversary screening of the film was announced in December 2023 to take place at the 2024 Sundance Film Festival on January 25, 2024 to commemorate the festival's 40th anniversary. On the announcement, Jennifer Kent remarked "I definitely have some distance on Babadook now, after ten years. The film feels like an old friend, one that changed my life in many ways ... Sundance was such a huge part of that change. I look forward to 'coming home' to the place where it all began, and to the festival that has given me and 'Mister B' so much."

=== Home media ===
The film, alongside the short film Monster, was first released on DVD and Blu-ray in Australia by Umbrella Entertainment on 31 October 2014. The US Blu-ray and DVD was released on 14 April 2015 by IFC Midnight and Scream Factory, and the special edition was also available on that date. The special edition features Kent's short film, Monster, and behind the scenes feature Creating the Book by Juhasz. The UK Blu-ray Disc features the short documentary films Illustrating Evil: Creating the Book, There's No Place Like Home: Creating the House and Special Effects: The Stabbing Scene.

The film began streaming on Netflix in 2016 and was later obtained by Shudder.

== Reception ==
=== Box office ===
The Babadook grossed $10.7 million worldwide against an estimated production budget of $2 million. The film opened in Australia on 22 May 2014 in 13 cinemas on a limited release, eventually grossing a total of $258,000. The film fared much better internationally than it did in its native country. In North America, The Babadook opened on a limited release basis in three theaters and grossed US$30,007 on its opening weekend, with an average of $10,002 per theater. It generated $633,000 in the United Kingdom in its opening weekend (surpassing its entire Australian run), and made over $1.09 million in France and $335,000 in Thailand. In France, it opened at number 11 in the local box office, which producer Kristian Molière credited to Wild Bunch's promoting, and contrasted this with Australian promoters that declined to book the film slots in multiplexes. Its success overseas re-generated interest in Australia ahead of DVD releases and television screenings.

=== Critical response ===
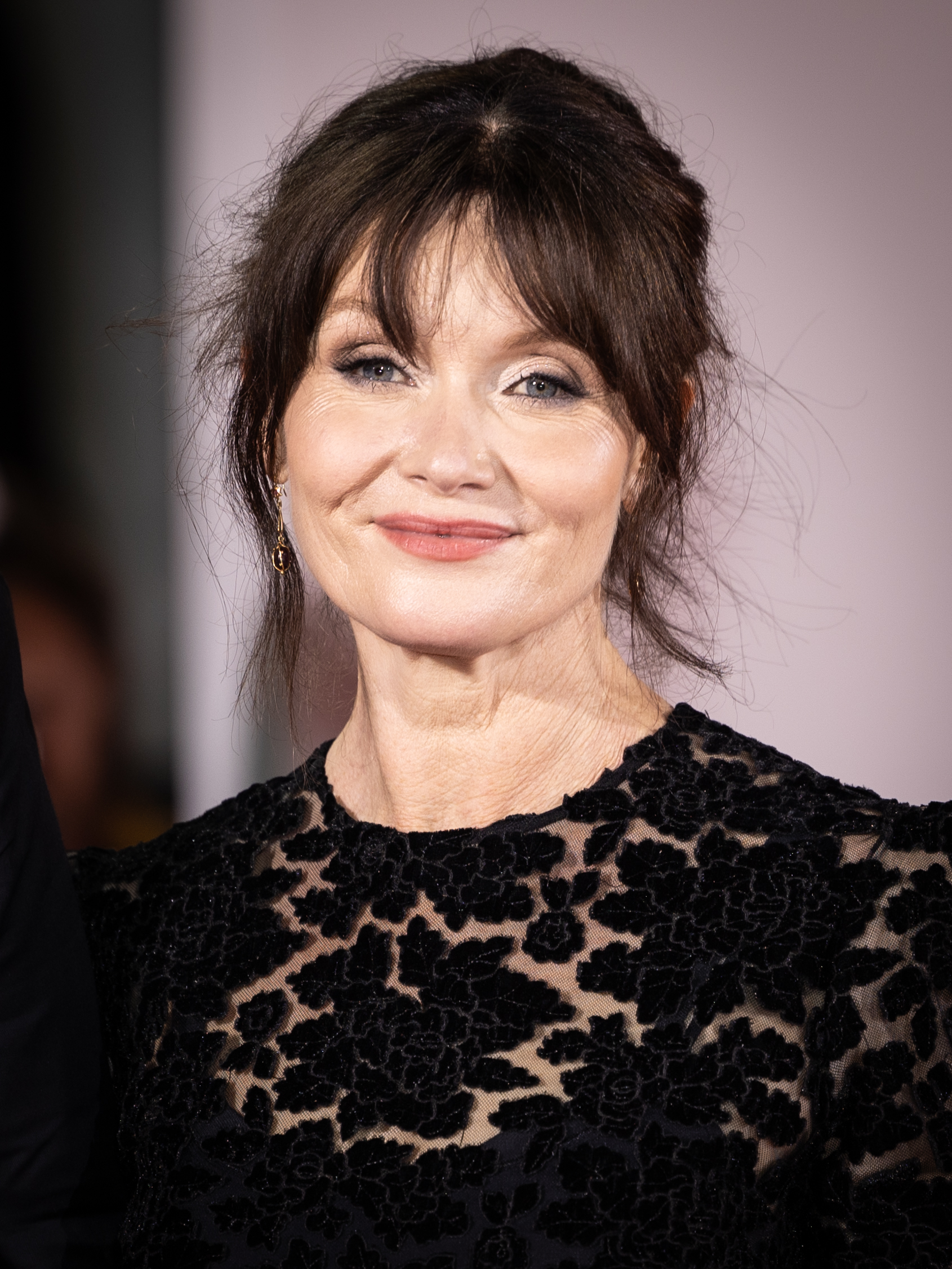
Essie Davis, who plays Amelia

On the review aggregator website Rotten Tomatoes, the film holds an approval rating of 98% based on 248 reviews, with an average rating of 8.2/10. The website's critics consensus reads, "The Babadook relies on real horror rather than cheap jump scares – and boasts a heartfelt, genuinely moving story to boot." It was ranked the best reviewed horror film and third best-reviewed film of 2014 on the site. As of October 2025, Rotten Tomatoes ranks The Babadook the 5th best horror film of all time. On Metacritic, which assigns a weighted average score out of 100 to reviews from mainstream critics, the film received an average score of 86 based on 34 reviews, indicating "universal acclaim".

Glenn Kenny, writing for RogerEbert.com, called the film "the finest and most genuinely provocative horror movie to emerge in this still very-new century." Dan Schindel from Movie Mezzanine said that "The Babadook is the best genre creature creation since the big black wolf-dog aliens from Attack the Block." In The Guardian, Peter Bradshaw described the film as a "Freudian thriller", giving it 4 out of 5 stars and praised the performances, themes and Kent's direction. Bradshaw said that "Kent exerts a masterly control over this tense situation and the sound design is terrifically good: creating a haunted, insidiously whispery intimacy that never relies on sudden volume hikes for the scares." In Variety, Scott Foundas commended the production design and direction, saying that the film "manages to deliver real, seat-grabbing jolts while also touching on more serious themes of loss, grief and other demons that can not be so easily vanquished".

On 30 November 2014, William Friedkin, director of The Exorcist (1973) stated on his Twitter profile, "Psycho, Alien, Diabolique, and now THE BABADOOK." Friedkin also added, "I've never seen a more terrifying film. It will scare the hell out of you as it did me." Prominent British film critic Mark Kermode named The Babadook his favourite film of 2014 and in 2018 listed it his eighth favourite film of the decade. In 2022, Samuel Murrian declared it the "best horror movie so far this century" in Parade.

In subsequent years, The Babadook has been listed as a modern cult film. In The Guardian, Luke Buckmaster listed it as one of the best Australian films of the 2010s. Film scholar Amanda Howell argues that part of the film's critical success can be attributed to many film critics having discussed the film within the context of art-horror rather than purely as a horror film. Howell discussed the film as part of an international cycle of contemporary art-horror films alongside Pan's Labyrinth (2006), Let the Right One In (2008), and Antichrist (2009) that negotiate and blur the boundaries between art and horror. In 2025, it ranked number four on The Hollywood Reporter's list of the "25 Best Horror Movies of the 21st Century".

=== Accolades ===
The Babadook became the first Australian horror film to win the three top prizes at the AFI or AACTA Awards: Best Picture, Best Director, and Best Original Screenplay.

Award	Category	Recipient(s)	Result	Ref.
AACTA Awards	Best Film	Kristina Ceyton and Kristian Molière	Won (Note: Tied with The Water Diviner)	
AACTA Awards	Best Direction	Jennifer Kent	Won	
AACTA Awards	Best Original Screenplay	Jennifer Kent	Won	
AACTA Awards	Best Actress	Essie Davis	Nominated	
AACTA Awards	Best Editing	Simon Njoo	Nominated	
AACTA Awards	Best Production Design	Alex Holmes	Nominated	
AACTA International Awards	Best Actress	Essie Davis	Nominated	
Critics' Choice Awards	Best Sci-Fi/Horror Movie	The Babadook	Nominated	
Critics' Choice Awards	Best Young Actor	Noah Wiseman	Nominated	
Detroit Film Critics Society Awards	Best Actress	Essie Davis	Nominated	
Detroit Film Critics Society Awards	Best Breakthrough	Jennifer Kent	Nominated	
Empire Awards	Best Female Newcomer	Essie Davis	Nominated	
Empire Awards	Best Horror	The Babadook	Won	
Fangoria Chainsaw Awards	Best Limited-Release/Direct-to-Video Film	Jennifer Kent	Won	
Fangoria Chainsaw Awards	Best Screenplay	Jennifer Kent	Won	
Fangoria Chainsaw Awards	Best Actress	Essie Davis	Won	
Fangoria Chainsaw Awards	Best Supporting Actor	Noah Wiseman	Won	
New York Film Critics Circle Awards	Best First Feature	Kristina Ceyton; Kristian Molière	Won	
Online Film Critics Society Awards	Best Actress	Essie Davis	Nominated	
San Francisco Film Critics Circle Awards	Best Actress	Essie Davis	Nominated	
Saturn Awards	Best Horror Film	Kristina Ceyton and Kristian Molière	Nominated	
Saturn Awards	Best Actress	Essie Davis	Nominated	
Saturn Awards	Best Performance by a Younger Actor	Noah Wiseman	Nominated	

=== LGBTQ community ===
The Babadook has gained popularity as an internet meme, with the titular monster being ironically adopted as a queer icon. In October 2016, a Tumblr user joked that the Babadook is openly gay; in December 2016, another Tumblr user posted a viral screenshot showing the film classified by Netflix as an LGBTQ film. Despite the absence of overt references to LGBTQ culture in the film, fans and journalists generated interpretations of queer subtext in the film (dubbed "Babadiscourse") that were often tongue-in-cheek, but occasionally more serious, highlighting the character's dramatic persona, grotesque costume, and chaotic effect within a traditional family structure. In June 2017, The Babadook trended on Twitter and was displayed as a symbol during that year's Pride Month. The social media response became so strong that theatres in Los Angeles took the opportunity to hold screenings of the film for charity. Michael Bronski said to the Los Angeles Times: "In this moment, who better than the Babadook to represent not only queer desire, but queer antagonism, queer in-your-faceness, queer queerness?", and drew comparisons to historic connections between queerness and horror fiction such as Frankenstein and Dracula.

Kent said that she "loved" the meme, saying that "I think it's crazy and [the meme] just kept him alive. I thought ah, you bastard. He doesn't want to die so he's finding ways to become relevant." In 2019, IFC Films, the film's US distributor, released a limited Pride edition of the film on Blu-ray.

== Themes and symbolism ==
The Babadook is a psychological horror film.

Writing for The Daily Beast, Tim Teeman contends that grief is the "real monster" in The Babadook, and that the film is "about the aftermath of death; how its remnants destroy long after the dead body has been buried or burned". Teeman writes that he was "gripped" by the "metaphorical imperative" of Kent's film, with the Babadook monster representing "the shape of grief: all-enveloping, shape-shifting, black". Teeman states that the film's ending "underscored the thrum of grief and loss at the movie's heart", and concludes that it informs the audience that grief has its place and the best that humans can do is "marshal it".

Collider also proposed that the monster "seems to symbolize Amelia and Sam's shared grief/trauma over losing Oskar" and that Amelia's efforts to suppress this led to it becoming stronger. The writers suggest that "healing from serious traumas in real life does not happen overnight, but takes a lot of mental and emotional processing. The Babadook warns of the dangers of trying to ignore or 'stuff' our traumas below the surface: this is the most dangerous place to put them because that's where we lose control of them and they gain control over us."

== See also ==
- "Treehouse of Horror XXXIII"
- Cinema of Australia
