= CBS Sports Spectacular =

Television series

- Logo used from 2006 until 2015
- Also known as: The CBS Sports Spectacular (1960-1981); CBS Sports Saturday / Sunday (1981–1994); Eye on Sports (1994–1995); The CBS Sports Show (1995–1996)
- Genre: Sports anthology program
- Presented by: See host section
- Opening theme: See theme music section
- Country of origin: United States
- Original language: English
- No. of seasons: 58

Production
- Production location: Varies depending on the event
- Camera setup: Multi-camera
- Running time: 60 minutes
- Production company: CBS Sports

Original release
- Network: CBS
- Release: January 3, 1960 – present

CBS Sports Spectacular is a sports anthology television program produced by CBS Sports, the sports division of the CBS television network in the United States. The series began on January 3, 1960, as The CBS Sports Spectacular, and has been known under many different names, including CBS Sports Saturday, CBS Sports Sunday, Eye on Sports and The CBS Sports Show. The program continues to air on an irregular basis on weekend afternoons, especially during the late spring and summer months. Normally it airs pre-recorded "time-buy" sports events produced by outside companies, such as supercross or skiing competitions, or sponsored documentaries.

== Hosts ==
Hosts of the program have included John "Bud" Palmer, Jack Whitaker, Brent Musburger, Pat Summerall, Jim Kelly, Dick Stockton, Tim Brant, John Tesh, Jim Nantz, Greg Gumbel, Pat O'Brien, Andrea Joyce, and Michele Tafoya.

Under its current format, the program does not have a regular host.

== Sports featured ==
The earliest surviving telecast may be of the Twin 100 qualifying races before the second Daytona 500 at Daytona International Speedway in 1960. NASCAR has a kinescope of it. In 1994, CBS had a new series of boxing bouts on Saturday or Sundays under the Eye on Sports banner. Tim Ryan (blow-by-blow) and Gil Clancy (color) were the commentators during this period. CBS continued airing boxing on a somewhat regular basis until 1998, by which time they had the NFL (after acquiring the American Football Conference package from NBC) and college football back on their slate. As of early 2020, the series airs mainly on the CBS Sports Network.

Currently, the most frequent sports that have been featured are the PBR Bull Riding series, the Lucas Oil Off-Road Racing Series and Major League Fishing. Other events include the Deer Valley Celebrity Skifest, the Arete Awards for Courage in Sports, Year in Review shows and various documentaries. In 2018, it carried the first and only edition of the Gamers' Choice Awards.

By 2008, this was a partial list of the events that were featured:

- Tennis: Sony Ericsson Open
- Tennis: Cincinnati Masters
- Tennis: Penn Pilot Open
- Snowboarding: Jeep 48Straight Championships
- Freestyle Skiing: Jeep 48Straight Championships
- Track & Field: Reebok Grand Prix (from New York)
- Action Sports World Championships

=== Memorable moments ===
- 1960 Monaco Grand Prix (which took place on May 29) is broadcast on June 11. This was first broadcast of the Monaco Grand Prix in the United States.
- 1973 Tennis – Bobby Riggs defeats Margaret Court 6–2, 6–1 on Mother's Day in first Battle of the Sexes match.
- 1977 World's Strongest Man – The inaugural event featured the likes of Bruce Wilhelm, Lou Ferrigno and Ken Patera
- 1978 Belmont Stakes – Affirmed defeated Alydar to become the final horse racing Triple Crown winner until American Pharoah in 2015.
- 1979 Daytona 500 – The first 500-mile race to be broadcast in its entirety live on national television in the United States.
- Game 6 of the 1980 Stanley Cup Finals – The New York Islanders would defeat the Philadelphia Flyers in overtime, 5–4, to win their first ever Stanley Cup championship. This would be the first National Hockey League playoff game to air on American broadcast network television since 1975, and the last NHL game on American broadcast network television until the 1990 All-Star Game aired on NBC.
- 2008 Reebok Grand Prix – Usain Bolt breaks the men's 100m world record for the first time with a sprint of 9.72 seconds.

== Theme music ==
An original composition by Edd Kalehoff featuring scat vocals was used as the theme for The CBS Sports Spectacular beginning in 1970. From 1976 to 1978, the Electric Light Orchestra's "Fire on High" was used as the theme for the program (when it was known as The CBS Sports Special). In 1979, the program switched to an "in-house" version of American composer Aaron Copland's symphonic instrumental "Fanfare for the Common Man", which was used until 1980. The CBS version of "Fanfare" – clocking in at 1 minute and eight seconds – was styled after the 9 minute, 40 second version recorded by UK progressive rock group Emerson, Lake & Palmer on its 1977 LP, Works Volume 1.

For CBS' Super Bowl XVI coverage at the end of the 1981 NFL season, CBS' theme music would eventually become the theme for CBS Sports Saturday/Sunday. The music itself could be considered a hybrid of the theme used at the time for The NFL Today and their original college basketball theme.

== See also ==
- ESPN Sports Saturday
- Wide World of Sports
- Sportsworld
- Monster Jam
