= The Code (Australian TV series) =

- Genre: Conspiracy thriller
- Created by: Shelley Birse
- Written by: Shelley Birse
- Directed by: Shawn Seet
- Starring: Dan Spielman; Ashley Zukerman; Adele Perovic; Adam Garcia; Chelsie Preston Crayford; Paul Tassone; Dan Wyllie; Lucy Lawless; Aden Young; David Wenham
- Composer: Roger Mason
- Country of origin: Australia
- Original language: English
- No. of series: 2
- No. of episodes: 12

Production
- Executive producers: Carole Sklan; David Ogilvy; Greer Simpkin
- Producers: Shelley Birse; David Maher; David Taylor
- Cinematography: Bruce Young
- Editor: Deborah Peart
- Running time: 56 minutes
- Production companies: Playmaker Media; ABC

Original release
- Network: ABC1
- Release: 21 September 2014 – 6 October 2016

The Code is an Australian drama television program created and produced by Shelley Birse. Developed from a partnership between Playmaker Media and the Australian Broadcasting Corporation, it premiered on ABC1 in Australia on 21 September 2014, and the first season aired through 26 October 2014. Season 2 of The Code premiered on 1 September 2016, and aired through 6 October 2016.

The first six-part series, set in both outback and metropolitan areas of Australia, interweaves several plot lines. The first follows brothers Ned (Dan Spielman) and Jesse Banks (Ashley Zukerman), who publish a video of a mysterious outback accident, and Hani Parande (Adele Perovic), who becomes involved with them. The second follows the accident, which sees teacher Alex Wisham (Lucy Lawless) and policeman Tim Simons (Aaron Pedersen) becoming involved in the personal affairs of accused teenager Clarence Boyd (Aaron L. McGrath). The third covers Ned's journalism office, managed by Perry Benson (Adam Garcia). The fourth chronicles the intrigues of Deputy Prime Minister Ian Bradley (David Wenham), and political staffers Randall Keats (Aden Young) and Sophie Walsh (Chelsie Preston Crayford) while the after-effects of the accident unfold.

ABC in June 2015 renewed The Code for a second season, after receiving significant funding from the Australian Capital Territory's film fund, Screen ACT. The new series that commenced screening in 2016, deals with fictional brothers Ned and Jesse Banks facing deportation to the United States of America to face trial in connection with security breaches. Anthony LaPaglia, Sigrid Thornton, Robyn Malcolm, and others joined the cast for the second series.

== Synopsis ==
Series 1: A stolen vehicle collides with a transport truck in the middle of the desert. Two Aboriginal teenagers in the car are critically injured but nobody called for help because someone involved works for a major stakeholder in a secret research project. The accident would have remained a mystery if it had not been for Ned Banks, a young internet journalist desperate for a break, and his brother Jesse Banks, a hacker on a strict good behaviour bond.

Series 2: Two Australians are murdered in West Papua, the only survivor being Jan Roth, the fugitive founder of a "dark web" site, who is being chased by both Australian and US authorities. At the same time, a young boy is kidnapped in Australia by someone offering to sell him to paedophiles through the same site. The Australian Federal Police contacts the Banks brothers and informs them that the US authorities have demanded their extradition to the US for their previous actions, but if Jesse helps the police find the boy, the government will resist the extradition demands. Jesse agrees, but soon finds that the truth is very different.

== Cast ==
=== Main ===
- Dan Spielman as Ned Banks, journalist at Password
- Ashley Zukerman as Jesse Banks, Ned's brother
- Adele Perovic as Hani Parande, student and hacktivist who befriends Jesse

==== Series 1 ====
- Adam Garcia as Perry Benson, chief editor of internet news journal, Password
- Chelsie Preston Crayford as Sophie Walsh, director of communications at PM's office
- Paul Tassone as Andy King, head of security at Physanto
- Dan Wyllie as Lyndon Joyce, AFP investigator
- Lucy Lawless as Alex Wisham, schoolteacher at Lindara
- Aden Young as Randall Keats, Chief of Staff, Department of Prime Minister and Cabinet
- David Wenham as Ian Bradley, Deputy Prime Minister and Minister for Foreign Affairs and Trade

==== Series 2 ====
- Anthony LaPaglia as Jan Roth, fugitive hacker living in West Papua
- Sigrid Thornton as Lara Dixon, head of the government's cyber ops unit
- Robyn Malcolm as Marina Baxter, Minister for Foreign Affairs
- Geoff Morrell as David Banks, Ned and Jesse's estranged father
- Ben Oxenbould as Nolan Daniels, senior AFP agent
- Ella Scott Lynch as Meg Flynn, a photographer and activist for West Papuan independence

=== Recurring ===
==== Canberra, Australian Capital Territory ====
- David Roberts as Peter Lawson, political journalist, National News Australia (series 1)
- May Lloyd as Isabelle Banks, mother of Ned and Jesse (series 1)
- Steen Raskopoulos as Edan, editorial staff member at Password (series 1)
- Zindzi Okenyo as Millie Hussey, journalist at Password (series 1)
- Sophie Gregg as Trina Daniels, data encryption technician at Physanto (series 1)
- Erik Thomson as Niko Gaelle, international black marketeer in arms and stolen IP (series 1)
- Victoria Haralabidou as Alila Parande, Hani's mother (series 1 and 2)
- Michael Denkha as Nasim Parande, Hani's father, bio-tech engineer (series 1 and 2)
- Nathan Lovejoy as Will Sharp, Marina Baxter's Chief of Staff (series 2)
- Steve Rodgers as Malcolm Coover, head of AFP Cyber Crime Unit (series 1)
- Lindsay Farris as Dean Carson, AFP Cyber Crime Unit interrogator (series 1)
- Kelvin Shone as local policeman at Parliament House (series 1)
- Guy Edmonds as Gary Hunter/Youngblood, operator of the paedophile forum on the UndaCounta site (series 2)
- Otis Pavlovic as Callum McCray, abducted teenage boy (series 2)
- Sandy Winton as Michael McCray, Callum's father (series 2)
- Liz Harper as Courtney McCray, Callum's mother (series 2)
- Stephanie King as Erin Jennings, Ned's ex-girlfriend and contact at Parliament House (series 2)
- Arka Das as Farid (series 1)

==== Lindara, New South Wales ====
- Aaron L. McGrath as Clarence Boyd, driver of the stolen car
- Aaron Pedersen as Tim Simons, local policeman at Lindara
- Ursula Yovich as Kitty Boyd, Clarence's mother
- Mitzi Ruhlmann as Missy Wisham, Alex's daughter
- Madeleine Madden as Sheyna Smith, the passenger in the car
- Tim McCunn as Carl Smith, Sheyna's father
- Lisa Flanagan as Eadie Smith, Sheyna's mother

==== West Papua ====
- William Ani as Marcus Komblan, leader of the West Papuan independence movement
- Emele Ugavule as Kiki Gangi-Roth, Jan Roth's wife
- Annabelle Malaika Süess as Tahila Gangi-Roth, Jan Roth's daughter

== Episodes ==
=== Series 1 (2014) ===
No. overall	No. in series	Title	Directed by	Written by	Original release date	Aus. viewers
1	1	"Episode 1"	Shawn Seet	Shelley Birse	21 September 2014	771,000
In Lindara, a small town in remote New South Wales, two aboriginal teens are missing; Clarence Boyd, who had been staying in the temporary care of schoolteacher Alex Wisham, had taken his school sweetheart Sheyna Smith on a joyride and collided with a truck. Trapped in the car, Sheyna urged Clarence to flee the scene to escape an attacker from the truck. Later that night, Clarence returns to Wisham's house, bloodied and disoriented. He gives a somewhat incoherent account of having fallen unconscious and later awakening to find that both the car and Sheyna had vanished. The car is discovered the following day, alongside Sheyna's dead body. Alex also finds Clarence's damaged phone, which holds a corrupted, unplayable video of the teenagers. In Canberra, government officials have heard of the crash, and attempt to discover further information about those involved. Deputy prime minister Ian Bradley gives material to chief of staff Randall Keats, who orders Director of Communications Sophie Walsh to leak it to her former boyfriend, Password journalist Ned Banks. Intrigued, he discovers the initial police report about the crash, phoning Alex to find out more. Though she initially declines to comment, she later sends the corrupted video to Ned, who enlists the aid of his autistic brother, Jesse Banks, to repair the file. Jesse has a talent for using computers, currently on a good behaviour bond following a cyber crime conviction for a hacking incident. Jesse repairs the video, discovering that it shows the collision and its aftermath in which the car is pushed into a gorge with Sheyna trapped inside. While Password publishes the file, Jesse investigates further, finding a single frame on the video that displays the truck's number plate; the registration traces to Physanto, ostensibly a biotech and medical research company, but Jesse suspects it to be a front for some other secretive purpose. Against the rules of his bond, he hacks into the company's servers, downloading some encrypted files, but is noticed by their security, who implant destructive malware and spyware on his system. Similarly, Password is also attacked; the video is removed and Ned receives an ominous email warning him not to post it again. They decide that they must send someone to Lindara to recover Clarence's phone with the original copy; though initially reluctant to leave Jesse on his own, Ned decides to leave, reassured that he will be safe in the company of Hani Parande, who shares similar interests and skills to Jesse. As Ned leaves, Jesse is thrown into a van, and taken away.
2	2	"Episode 2"	Shawn Seet	Shelley Birse	28 September 2014	584,000
Ned arrives in Lindara, further investigating the crash. Clarence reveals to him that the delivery truck was escorted by two cars; it emerges that the escort was a security detail led by Andy King, who had pushed the car over the cliff to clean up the scene. In Canberra, Jesse is being interrogated by the AFP; the head of its Cyber Crime Unit (CCU), Malcolm Coover, is investigating the files that Jesse stole from Physanto. Jesse admits to his lack of knowledge concerning the situation, vowing never to speak of the kidnapping again. Meanwhile, Coover tasks AFP investigator Lyndon Joyce with finding Physanto's head of security Andy King. Later that night, an intruder tries to gain entry to Clarence's room; failing, the intruder escapes from the property without being identified. The following day, Clarence has gone missing; Ned finds him submerged in a nearby waterhole as a vehicle is seen leaving the area. Lyndon later arrives in Lindara, and encounters Ned. He demands Clarence's phone, making veiled threats about consequences for Jesse should Ned pursue the story further. Worried, Ned rushes back to Canberra, discovering Jesse distraught and in a state of fear. The following day, Hani tries to soothe Jesse, who is unable to sleep. She shows Ned the encrypted files that Jesse found in his investigation of Physanto, offering to decrypt the files; Ned adamantly refuses, as it would expose her to danger. After Hani leaves, she is seen meeting Lyndon; revealing that Hani is now reluctantly working for Coover, tasked with retrieving Jesse's copy of the encrypted files. Meanwhile, Andy meets Trina Daniels, a data encryption technician at Physanto. She tells him that the company has upgraded all data security, showing him her breach report for an upcoming meeting. When she tells Andy that she cannot continue with providing him with Physanto's secrets, he embraces her in a soothing gesture that turns into a stranglehold, suffocating her.
3	3	"Episode 3"	Shawn Seet	Blake Ayshford	5 October 2014	477,000
As Trina's body is found, multiple pieces of evidence enhance the proof against Andy, intensifying the AFP's search for him. Meanwhile, Andy attempts to make a deal for half of the Physanto file; he is denied, the full file being demanded. Returning to his car, he finds Lyndon, who is his friend. After a short conversation, Lyndon asks Coover for backup, advising that he is with Andy; Coover orders Lyndon to release him. Andy then travels to the Banks' residence, which is empty; taking advantage of Ned and Jesse's mother's dementia, he discovers Jesse's whereabouts. Meanwhile, Ned arrives at home, discovering that Jesse and Hani went on a road trip, and had forgotten Jesse's medication. At the Password offices, Ned is informed that the cargo being delivered by the Physanto truck was listed in the transport manifest as high grade engine oil. After also being told that Hani's father is a bio-engineer at Physanto, he realises where Jesse and Hani have gone: Karawatha, a country property owned by the Banks' family. Arriving there, Ned informs Jesse about Hani's father, which she neglected to tell him. It emerges that, after her own conviction for cyber crime, she was coerced into being an informant for the CCU, under threat of having her parents deported back to Iran. Refusing to believe this, Jesse demands Ned leave. Shortly after, Andy arrives at the house and demands the Physanto files from Jesse. Hani and Jesse then disable Andy in a joint attack and escape in the van, but Jesse, hurt at discovering that Hani has befriended him for her own ulterior reasons, throws her onto the side of the road and drives away.
4	4	"Episode 4"	Shawn Seet	Shelley Birse	12 October 2014	578,000
Hani turns up at Ned's place to find Jesse still absent. She briefs Ned on what happened at Karawatha and urges him to find Jesse before the AFP does. She has been ignoring calls from her AFP handlers and when she later goes home, while questioning her mother, Alilah Parande (Victoria Haralabidou), about the work her father does for Physanto, they are interrupted by immigration officials with a search warrant, ostensibly acting on a tip-off about possible breaches of the Immigration Act. Sophie Walsh is feeling similarly menaced. She arrives at work to find herself locked out of the network and distanced by her boss, Randall Keats. Later in the day, they are both called into a meeting with Ian Bradley, who warns Sophie about electronic snooping in areas that she has no business in. Ned finds Jesse and they both go back to Karawatha to check on what happened there after Jesse's run in with Andy King. They find a lot of blood, but their survey of the scene is curtailed by the arrival of Malcolm Coover in a police car. They manage to escape unnoticed. Andy King has survived the assault on him there. We see him in his vehicle, alive but injured, treating his wounds with a first aid kit. He ignores a call on his mobile, one of several missed calls from black marketeer, Niko Gaelle. Lyndon Joyce catches up with Hani and pressures her to keep cooperating with the AFP and to try to win back Jesse's confidence. She agrees on condition that she is shown her parents' and her own immigration files. Lyndon eventually brings her the files, which leads her to question her parents about the circumstances of their escape from Iran. Ned gets news from Alex that Clarence Boyd is having flashbacks of a gas having been released from the Physanto truck. He has lung damage and is now on respiratory support at Broken Hill Hospital. Ned and Jesse travel there. With Jesse's help, they seize an opportunity to search the hospital records for the autopsy report on Sheyna Smith to see if it contains anything mirroring Clarence's condition. They find two versions of it. The second attributes her death to injuries sustained in the crash, but the original lists evidence of lung damage consistent with pneumonitis. Ned and Alex make an overnight visit to Lindara, where they advise Sheyna's mother, Eadie, to apply for a copy of the autopsy report. Meanwhile, in Broken Hill, Jesse uses the time to decrypt the Physanto files and finds significant information about its work and what was in the truck. In the morning, Carl Smith encounters Jesse celebrating his achievement at the local pub, and targets him. He lures Jesse away to a secluded spot, where he stages a violent assault on himself, framing Jesse as the assailant. Conveniently, this provides the authorities something they can charge Jesse with that will be uncomplicated by matters they would prefer not to raise in open court. Ned returns to Broken Hill just in time to find Jesse being transferred to the custody of the AFP, who transport him to Canberra. Ned follows and tries to visit Jesse at AFP headquarters, but is denied access to his brother. Ned visits Sophie, where, examining his laptop, they find a message from Jesse with the information he has discovered. Sophie realises the full import of it and gives Ned an insight into its significance. Among Ned's papers, she sees the material on Poulson she had previously given him and notices among it the clue that led Ned to the Lindara story, a scrap of paper bearing the single word "Lindara", which she recognises as having been torn from her work date-planner. When the AFP find out what Jesse knows, they call Ned in and use their leverage against Jesse to blackmail Ned into dropping the story. Ian Bradley offers to have the charge against Jesse reduced and promises Ned that when news about Physanto's work is eventually made public in a controlled manner, he will have the exclusive news break.
5	5	"Episode 5"	Shawn Seet	Justin Monjo	19 October 2014	555,000
Andy King is at the gates of the Pakistani embassy, where he intercepts the arrival of a chauffeur-driven car containing mid-level employees, executive-assistant Salim Malik and his wife Loubna (Shameer Birgess and Monique Kalmar). He tells them he is having trouble contacting a mutual acquaintance, Niko Gaelle, that he will soon have what they want and if they won't deal with him directly, he will find another buyer. At AFP headquarters, Malcolm Coover and Mason Cole (Andy Rodoreda), representing U.S. intelligence, are showing Ian Bradley security footage of the encounter. Cole tells him the Maliks are not acting for or with the knowledge of the Pakistani government, but are probably acting as middle-men for Iran, North Korea, a rogue African state or suchlike. Meanwhile, Jesse has been bailed and is home with Ned, who appears to have abandoned his pursuit of the Lindara story. A door knocker leaves an envelope at Ned's front door. The contents, which include his parliamentary press pass, send him to Parliament House, where preparations are underway for a press conference. Sophie confronts Randall with the clue that led Ned to the Lindara story, accusing him of deliberately planting it in the Coulson material for Ned to find and of doing so in a way that would implicate her. At the press conference, Ned asks Ian Bradley a Dorothy Dixer and is rewarded with an appointment for a meeting with Ian scheduled for later that afternoon. Ned phones Alex Wisham, to tell her that the gas that leaked from the Physanto truck and which scarred Sheyna's and Clarence's lungs was UF_{6}, partially enriched uranium, and that she should tell the hospital to treat Clarence for exposure to it. She goes to the hospital to talk to Clarence's mother, Kitty Boyd (Ursula Yovich), but she finds her and Clarence closing a compensation deal with a Physanto lawyer. Alex searches the Net for medical information about uranium hexafluoride. She finds her daughter Missy (Mitzi Ruhlmann) and other school children swimming in a water hole near the site of the accident. Dead fish and traces of a strange substance are washed up on the water's edge and she frantically orders them out of the water. She tries to explain the circumstances and the coverup attempt, including the framing of Jesse, to an incredulous Tim Simons. Meanwhile, Jesse has gone to Tom, the kebab vendor, to ask for his old job back. Hani is there. She makes approaches to Jesse, who rebuffs her, telling her she has lost his trust and that he has succeeded in decrypting the stolen Physanto files. Hani returns home to find Andy King there, who wants her to get him the Physanto file he is after. A struggle ensues, in which Hani succeeds in wounding Andy. Her parents later arrive home to find Andy trying to extract information from her. He then uses her to pressure her father Nasim into getting him access to the Physanto file he is seeking. Hani caves in and tells Andy that Jessie has the files and that he has decrypted them. Andy departs with Hani to contact Jessie, leaving her parents tied up. Andy, weakened by his wounds, calls Lyndon to come and meet him in a cemetery at the gravesite of his wife, Sharon, an army captain who died recently, aged 39. Lyndon gets to Andy moments after he has collapsed, but he orders an AFP trace on a frequently called number (Niko's) that he finds on Andy's phone. Meanwhile, Niko has found Hani in Andy's ute and takes her somewhere where he can finish what Andy started, holding her to ransom the physanto files from Jesse, who phones Ned for help. He tells Ned that although the police took his laptop, he had enclosed the USB stick in the birthday card he posted from Broken Hill to their mother, Isabelle. They retrieve the USB stick and rendezvous with Niko to trade it for Hani. Their call to him has enabled the AFP to obtain a location fix on Niko's phone and Lyndon arrives there just as the trade is about to occur, which all goes horribly wrong.
6	6	"Episode 6"	Shawn Seet	Shelley Birse	26 October 2014	564,000
Ned uses the parking permit he saw on the car in which the exchange took place to determine the identity of Farid, the postgraduate student who decrypted and checked the Physanto files for Niko Gaelle. Ned and Jesse confront Farid at the university — he not only tells them where Hani is, but also that Gaelle will pass the files on to Malik at the Pakistani embassy. Ned passes this information on to his editor at Password, and he and Jesse watch as a paramedic crew picks up Hani from Gaelle's warehouse. Ned and Jesse argue and fight about their next move, with Jesse telling him he is "sacked" as his carer. Federal police raid the embassy as they intercept a chauffeur they think is Gaelle, but instead they find a lookalike with empty diplomatic bags. Jesse manages to contact Hani, who has survived her torture and is now in hospital, and the two reconcile. Jesse then hitchhikes back to Lindara, where he speaks to Carl and convinces him to drop the assault charges. Ned is looking through Gaelle's warehouse, and hides as a team of government agents enters. The agents take all related documents, delete files from Gaelle's computer, and then as Ned watches, they drag Gaelle in and inject him with a substance which induces a heart attack. Sophie speaks to Randall who has had a crisis of conscience over the whole Lindara matter. He tells her to speak to Graeme Poulson, the minister who had just returned to work after his wife's suicide due to his affair which Sophie had leaked to Ned. Poulson tells her that the Physanto truck was not transporting uranium out of Lindara, but was intending to bury it in the area. Sophie returns to Parliament House, where Randall tells her he has resigned. He gives her a map of the burial sites, but keeps the other files from Ian Bradley's office and says she should stay "on the inside" to make a difference. Sophie asks him to do one more thing to help them. Ian Bradley returns to his office to find an e-mail from Randall containing a JPEG image. He opens the attachment, which allows Hani in Canberra and Jesse in Lindara to gain access to his computer. They activate his webcam and record his reaction to the photo of Clarence and Sheyna, which they broadcast to the families in Lindara. Realising he has been compromised, Bradley tries to trash all the Physanto files, but Hani intercepts them and sends them to every printer in the building. Randall also gives Bradley's files to Password for publication. With the evidence of his conspiracy revealed, Bradley resigns. Ned and Hani pick up Jesse from the airport, and Jesse tells Ned he wants him to move out so he can live with Hani. Unnoticed by them, Farid heads up an escalator, holding a USB stick, presumably containing the laser enrichment files...

=== Series 2 (2016) ===
No. overall	No. in series	Title	Directed by	Written by	Original release date	Aus. viewers
7	1	"Episode 1"	Shawn Seet	Shelley Birse	1 September 2016	668,000
Two Australians are murdered by militia in West Papua, the only survivor being Jan Roth (Anthony LaPaglia), the fugitive founder of "dark web" site UndaCounta. Roth's panicked phone call brings him to the attention of Australian authorities, who approach Ned and Jesse Banks at their mother's funeral to seek their assistance in finding and arresting Roth. The Australian Federal Police threaten them with deportation to the United States for their previous actions, but Jesse volunteers to help when informed that a young boy, Callum, has been kidnapped by someone behind the site to be sold as a sex slave. With the encouragement of the government's cyber ops chief, Lara Dixon (Sigrid Thornton), who runs a private cyber company, Vertex, Jesse gains Roth's trust by offering him the decryption keys to the parliamentary network and the identities of several undercover intelligence officers. Roth agrees to meet him in Far North Queensland, and Jesse takes Hani with him to hand over the files, however Roth eludes the police team watching them and takes Jesse and Hani onto his boat to return to West Papua.
8	2	"Episode 2"	Shawn Seet	Shelley Birse; Story by Sean Cook	8 September 2016	490,000
Roth brings Jesse and Hani to his compound in the jungles of West Papua, where he asks for their help to decrypt a file on his server. Desperate for news of his brother, Ned contacts a former girlfriend in Parliament House to acquire the names of the two murdered Australians, which he then links to photographer and activist Meg Flynn, who is working covertly for a large Australian mining company in Papua. Flynn tells Ned to stop contacting her as he is risking her cover, but later lets him know that Jesse is alive. Roth, Flynn, Jesse and Hani go to the morgue to view the body of a colleague who has been killed and framed for the murder of the Australians. As they leave, they are attacked by gunmen on motorbikes. Escaping into the jungle, Jesse goes into a catatonic state, but Roth carries him to safety. Trusting Roth more, Jesse tells him about the hidden paedophila forum on his site, and Roth seems genuinely shocked by the revelation. Returning to Australia, Roth's boat is intercepted by an Australian border patrol, and he convinces Jesse to jump into the water with him to "find the kid", Callum.
9	3	"Episode 3"	Shawn Seet	Shelley Birse	15 September 2016	N/A
Roth and Jesse are washed ashore on a beach in Queensland. Roth's compatriot, Marcus, the leader of the West Papuan independence movement, and his family are taken into immigration detention and quickly deported. Ned works with Meg Flynn to inform the Minister for Foreign Affairs, Marina Baxter (Robyn Malcolm), about the discrepancies in the government's story about Marcus's role in the attacks. Jesse contacts Hani to let her know he is alive, and Roth calls Gary, one of his lieutenants on UndaCounta, to meet them in North Queensland, not knowing that Gary kidnapped Callum. Gary leaves Callum at his unit in Fyshwick, with the boy's "buyer" on his way to the address, and heads to Queensland where he picks up Roth and Jesse and takes them to Roth's family farm. Roth confronts Gary about the paedophilia area of the site, and begins to choke him to force him to divulge Callum's location, but ends up forcing his foot onto his neck, killing him. Jesse flees in horror. He returns to Canberra, where he works with Lara Dixon and her team to identify Callum's buyer, who is intercepted and arrested by the AFP, and Callum is located and freed. Although the operation is a success, Hani's father's visa is revoked and Ned and Jesse face the threat of extradition.
10	4	"Episode 4"	Shawn Seet	Shelley Birse; Story by Sean Cook	22 September 2016	N/A
Ned, Jesse and Meg flee Australia and fly to West Papua, where they head to Roth's compound. Minister Baxter tries to make amends for her daughter missing out on a university course by approaching the university — she is rebuffed but is later surprised to hear her daughter has not only got a place in the course, but a scholarship as well. Hani is approached by her ex-boyfriend who now works for Vertex, and has been asked by Lara Dixon to get her help in finding Jesse. Roth gets Jesse stoned and drunk, and together the two gain the decryption keys for the Kaspion program from the U.S. government. Ned heads into town with Roth's wife to cover a protest over Marcus' treatment. As the protest heats up and police and/or security start firing, Roth's wife phones him and asks him to pick up their daughter, and as he arrives, she is shot in front of him.
11	5	"Episode 5"	Shawn Seet	Shelley Birse; Story by Sean Cook	29 September 2016	N/A
12	6	"Episode 6"	Shawn Seet	Shelley Birse	6 October 2016	N/A

== Production and filming ==
The fictional town of Lindara was filmed in Broken Hill, Silverton in New South Wales, and Cockburn in South Australia. The main street and post office of Cockburn doubles as the main street and school in Lindara, while the houses of the Lindara families were filmed in Silverton.

Parts of Canberra were used for filming, including the Australian Parliament House, the surrounds of Lake Burley Griffin, and parts of the Australian National University Acton campus, including the John Curtin School of Medical Research and the Shine Dome.

== Broadcast ==
The first series was acquired by BBC Four in the United Kingdom in April 2014, and premiered on 11 October 2014, less than three weeks after the Australian premiere. Because it aired as back-to-back episodes over three weeks, the final episode aired first in the UK on 25 October, over twelve hours ahead of its first Australian broadcast 26 October. The first series was also broadcast on DirecTV's Audience Network in the US, and ARTV in Canada.

== Awards and nominations ==
Year	Award	Category	Nominee	Result
2015	Logie Awards	Most Outstanding Drama Series	The Code	Nominated
2015	Logie Awards	Most Outstanding Actor	Ashley Zukerman	Nominated
2015	4th AACTA Awards	Best Television Drama Series	The Code – Shelley Birse, David Maher and David Taylor	Won
2015	4th AACTA Awards	Best Direction in a Television Drama or Comedy	Shawn Seet – Episode 1	Won
2015	4th AACTA Awards	Best Screenplay in Television	Shelley Birse – Episode 1	Nominated
2015	4th AACTA Awards	Best Lead Actor in a Television Drama	Dan Spielman	Nominated
2015	4th AACTA Awards	Best Lead Actor in a Television Drama	Ashley Zukerman	Won
2015	4th AACTA Awards	Best Guest or Supporting Actress in a Television Drama	Chelsie Preston Crayford – Episode 1	Won
2015	4th AACTA Awards	Best Editing in Television	Deborah Peart ASE – Episode 1	Won
2015	4th AACTA Awards	Best Sound in Television	Gerry Duffy, Danielle Wiessner, Robert Sullivan & Grant Shepherd – Episode 1	Nominated
2015	4th AACTA Awards	Best Original Music Score in Television	Roger Mason – Episode 1	Won
2015	4th AACTA Awards	Best Production Design in Television	Michelle McGahey – Episode 1	Nominated
2015	ADG Awards	Best Direction in a TV Drama Series	Shawn Seet – The Code (Series 1, Episode 4)	Won
2015	Screen Music Awards (Australia)	Best Music for a Television Series of Serial	Roger Mason – The Code	Nominated
2015	Screen Music Awards (Australia)	Best Television Theme	Roger Mason – The Code	Won
2015	ACS Cinematography Awards (NSW/ACT)	Drama or Comedy & Telefeatures	Bruce Young – The Code (Episode 4) 'Gold Award'	Won
2015	NSW Premier's Literary Awards	Betty Roland Prize for Scriptwriting	The Code - Episode 1, Shelley Birse (Playmaker Media)	Nominated
2015	Screen Producers Australia Awards	Drama Television Production of the Year	Playmaker Media – The Code	Won
2014	AWGIE Awards	Major Award Winner	Blake Ayshford, Shelley Birse & Justin Monjo – The Code	Won
2014	AWGIE Awards	Television Mini-Series Original	Blake Ayshford, Shelley Birse & Justin Monjo – The Code	Won
