= The Water Diviner =

2014 film by Russell Crowe

- Theatrical release poster
- Directed by: Russell Crowe
- Written by: Andrew Anastasios; Andrew Knight
- Produced by: Troy Lum; Andrew Mason; Keith Rodger
- Starring: Russell Crowe; Olga Kurylenko; Yılmaz Erdoğan; Cem Yılmaz; Jai Courtney; Ryan Corr; James Fraser; Ben O'Toole; Isabel Lucas
- Cinematography: Andrew Lesnie
- Edited by: Matt Villa
- Music by: David Hirschfelder
- Production companies: RatPac Entertainment; Seven Network Australia; Hopscotch Features; Fear of God Films
- Distributed by: Universal Pictures (Australia); Warner Bros. Pictures (United States)
- Release dates: 26 December 2014 (Australia); 24 April 2015 (United States)
- Running time: 111 minutes
- Countries: Australia; United States
- Languages: English; Turkish
- Budget: $22.5 million
- Box office: $38.2 million

The Water Diviner is a 2014 drama film starring and directed by Russell Crowe, in his directorial debut, and written by Andrew Anastasios and Andrew Knight. Its plot follows an Australian farmer who travels to Turkey soon after World War I to find the bodies of his three sons who never returned. The film also stars Olga Kurylenko, Jai Courtney, Cem Yılmaz, Yılmaz Erdoğan, and Jacqueline McKenzie.

The Water Diviner had its world premiere at the State Theatre in Sydney, Australia on 2 December 2014. It opened in Australian and New Zealand cinemas on Boxing Day 2014. The film had a limited release in the United States on 24 April 2015. At the 4th AACTA Awards, it won for Best Film and Erdoğan won the AACTA Award for Best Supporting Actor.

== Plot ==
In 1919, just after the end of World War I, Joshua Connor, an Australian farmer and water diviner living in the remote Outback. His three sons Arthur, Edward, and Henry had served with the Australian and New Zealand Army Corps (ANZAC) during the military campaign in Gallipoli four years previously and are presumed dead. After his wife Eliza dies by suicide out of grief, Joshua resolves to bring his sons' bodies home and bury them with their mother.

Joshua travels to Turkey and stays in a hotel in Istanbul run by war-widowed Ayshe, but is unable to travel to Gallipoli by road. Learning the purpose of his journey, Ayshe tells him to bribe a local fisherman to travel to Gallipoli by boat. When he arrives, Joshua learns that ANZACs are engaged in a mass burial detail and all civilians are banned. Major Hasan, a Turkish Army officer assisting the ANZACs, persuades the ANZAC captain Lieutenant Colonel Cyril Hughes to prioritize helping Joshua with his search, as the only father to care enough to come all this way to find the fate of his sons. After finding Edward and Henry's graves, Joshua sees in his dreams that Arthur survives the battle. Hasan recognizes Joshua's surname and tells him that Arthur might have been taken prisoner.

Joshua returns to Istanbul, but fails to find out to which prison camp Arthur was transferred, as many Turkish records have been burned. He returns to Ayshe's hotel and learns that she is being pressed to marry her brother-in-law, Omer. Their argument becomes heated and Omer retreats when Joshua intervenes. Ayshe lashes out, blaming Joshua for making things worse and tells him to leave. As Joshua leaves the hotel, Omer and a few of his friends attack him, only to be stopped by Hasan's subordinate, Sergeant Jemal. Jemal takes Joshua to Hasan, who explains that the Greeks have invaded and they are going to defend their country as the British are not intervening. Joshua decides to travel with Hasan's group, who will pass through the region where his son might be. As Joshua returns to the hotel to retrieve his belongings, Ayshe apologizes for her earlier words.

While on the train, Jemal asks Joshua about a cricket bat he found in the Allied trenches when they retreated, as he is unsure whether it is a weapon or not. Joshua then explains to the Turkish soldiers on board the train the basic rules of cricket. However, Greek soldiers attack the train with only Jemal, Hasan and Joshua surviving the initial assault. Using the bat, Joshua saves Hasan as a Greek officer prepares to execute him but Jemal is killed in the resulting struggle. Joshua and Hasan flee to a nearby town where they spot a windmill, which Joshua saw in his recurring dream. There he finds Arthur alive but traumatised. Arthur reveals that at the end of the battle, Edward was still alive but badly wounded. He pleaded with Arthur to end his suffering, and Arthur reluctantly complied. Blaming himself for his brother's death, Arthur felt he could never return to his family.

The Greek soldiers who previously attacked the train begin to attack the town, and the two men try to escape through the mountains. Arthur refuses to follow his father, but relents when Joshua says that without his wife and sons, he has nowhere else to go. They successfully evade the Greek army and return to Ayshe's hotel. Joshua later drinks a cup of coffee made by Ayshe which indicates that she has fallen in love with him.

== Cast ==
- Russell Crowe as Joshua Connor
- Olga Kurylenko as Ayshe
- Dylan Georgiades as Orhan
- Yılmaz Erdoğan as Major Hasan
- Cem Yılmaz as Sergeant Jemal
- Jai Courtney as Lieutenant Colonel Cyril Hughes
- Ryan Corr as Arthur Connor
- Jacqueline McKenzie as Eliza Connor
- Isabel Lucas as Natalia
- Mert Fırat as Military Officer
- Daniel Wyllie as Captain Charles Brindley
- Damon Herriman as Father McIntyre
- Megan Gale as Fatma
- Deniz Akdeniz as Imam
- Steve Bastoni as Ömer
- James Fraser as Edward Connor
- Ben O'Toole as Henry Connor
- Robert Mammone as Colonel Demergelis
- Charlie Allan as Soldier At The Station Hall
- Michael Dorman as Greeves
- Sophia Forrest as Edith
- Christopher Sommers as Tucker

== Production ==
The story concept originated from a single line in a letter written by Lieutenant-Colonel Cyril Hughes, who was a worker in the Imperial War Graves unit. The footnote simply said, “One old chap managed to get here from Australia, looking for his son’s grave.” After a year of research, the writers were unable to identify the man or his son, which gave them the freedom to imagine a story which would become their screenplay.

On 18 June 2013, it was announced that Crowe had signed to make his directorial debut with an historical drama film The Water Diviner from a screenplay written by Andrew Knight and Andrew Anastasios. He would also star in the film. Producers would be Troy Lum, Andrew Mason and Keith Rodger and it was set to be shot in Australia and Turkey. On 25 March 2014, it was announced that Seven West Media and Seven Group Holdings would co-finance the film. On 7 November 2014, Warner Bros. Pictures acquired the US rights to the film.

=== Casting ===
Crowe portrays Joshua Connor, an Australian farmer. Olga Kurylenko was added to the cast on 18 October 2013 to co-star with Crowe. On 24 October, Jai Courtney was announced as having signed to star in The Water Diviner and another historical film, Unbroken. Courtney first filmed Unbroken and then moved to The Water Diviner, playing a soldier, Lt. Col. Cecil Hughes. Later, Turkish actors Cem Yılmaz and Yılmaz Erdoğan were also added to the cast, along with some Australian actors: Ryan Corr, Daniel Wyllie, Damon Herriman, Deniz Akdeniz, Steve Bastoni and Jacqueline McKenzie.

=== Filming ===
Principal photography began on 2 December 2013 in Australia.

=== Marketing ===
On 1 February 2014, the first official still from the film was revealed. On 28 April, the first footage from the film in a 7-minute featurette, narrated by Crowe, was revealed. The first official trailer for the film was released on 30 September.

== Release ==
The film was released in Australia, New Zealand, and Turkey on 26 December 2014, and it was released in Thailand on 15 January 2015. The film was initially to be released in the UK on 23 January 2015 but was moved to 3 April. The film was released in IMAX, and general, theaters by Warner Bros. Pictures in the United States on 24 April 2015. Entertainment One and Universal Pictures jointly released the film in Australia, with Universal releasing the film in France, Germany, Scandinavia, Switzerland, Austria and the Benelux and eOne releasing it in the U.K., Spain and Canada.

The film made its free-to-air television premiere on the Seven Network in Australia on 20 April 2015, a mere four months after its theatrical release in Australia for the centennial anniversary of ANZAC Day. Seven is an investor in the film.

== Reception ==
=== Critical response ===
On Rotten Tomatoes, the film has an approval rating of 63% based on 148 reviews; the average rating is 6.05/10. The website's critical consensus reads, "The Water Diviner finds Russell Crowe on somewhat uncertain footing as a director, but he's rescued by a strong performance from himself in the leading role." On Metacritic, the film has a score of 50 out of 100, based on 36 critics, indicating "mixed or average reviews". Audiences polled by CinemaScore gave the film an average grade of "A-" on an A+ to F scale.

Calls for a protest and boycott of the film on social media resulted in the Facebook page "Protest and Boycott the Water Diviner" which has over 16,000 fans. Descendants of victims of the 1915 Armenian genocide, Assyrian genocide and Greek genocide were incensed by the film's portrayal of the Turks as victims, at the same time that Turks were committing atrocities against their minorities. Various film critics described the movie as "a distortion of history that only serves to appease Turkey and its continued agenda of genocide denial." Anthony McAdam of The Spectator wrote: "Leaving aside aesthetic considerations, the fact is the film's lack of any historical context is breathtaking." McAdam notes that there is one "glaring omission" in the film, that being the lack of any mention of the Armenian genocide. Andrew O'Hehir of Salon questioned why Crowe and Warner Bros. released the film in the US on 24 April, the same day that Armenians commemorate the Armenian genocide, comparing it to releasing a film which ignores the Jewish Holocaust on Yom HaShoah.

=== Box office ===
The Water Diviner grossed $30.8 million worldwide. On 5 January 2015, it was named the highest grossing Australian-produced film of 2014, with a gross of $12,294,472. However, in many cinemas in the UK it was screened for just one week.

The film was received very favourably in Turkey at its debut and subsequent release. To date, the film has taken almost ₺14.3 million ($5.7 million).

=== Accolades ===
Award	Category	Subject	Result
AACTA Awards (4th)	Best Film^{1}	Andrew Mason	Won
AACTA Awards (4th)	Best Film^{1}	Troy Lum	Won
AACTA Awards (4th)	Best Film^{1}	Keith Rodger	Won
AACTA Awards (4th)	Best Original Screenplay	Andrew Anastasios	Nominated
AACTA Awards (4th)	Best Original Screenplay	Andrew Knight	Nominated
AACTA Awards (4th)	Best Actor	Russell Crowe	Nominated
AACTA Awards (4th)	Best Supporting Actor	Yılmaz Erdoğan	Won
AACTA Awards (4th)	Best Supporting Actress	Jacqueline McKenzie	Nominated
AACTA Awards (4th)	Best Editing	Matt Villa	Nominated
AACTA Awards (4th)	Best Production Design	Christopher Kennedy	Nominated
AACTA Awards (4th)	Best Costume Design	Tess Schofield	Won
AACTA Awards (4th)	Best Visual Effects	David Booth	Nominated
AACTA Awards (4th)	Best Visual Effects	Prue Fletcher	Nominated
AACTA Awards (4th)	Best Visual Effects	Marc Varisco	Nominated
AACTA Awards (4th)	Best Visual Effects	Adam Paschke	Nominated
ARIA Awards	Best Original Soundtrack, Cast or Show Album	soundtrack	Nominated
AWGIE Award	Best Writing in a Feature Film - Original	Andrew Anastasios	Won
AWGIE Award	Best Writing in a Feature Film - Original	Andrew Knight	Won
FCCA Awards	Best Film	Andrew Mason	Nominated
FCCA Awards	Best Film	Troy Lum	Nominated
FCCA Awards	Best Film	Keith Rodger	Nominated
FCCA Awards	Best Director	Russell Crowe	Nominated
FCCA Awards	Best Actor	Russell Crowe	Won
FCCA Awards	Best Supporting Actor	Yilmaz Erdogan	Won
FCCA Awards	Best Supporting Actress	Jacqueline McKenzie	Won
FCCA Awards	Best Cinematography	Andrew Lesnie	Nominated
FCCA Awards	Best Editing	Matt Villa	Nominated
FCCA Awards	Best Music Score	David Hirschfelder	Won
FCCA Awards	Best Production Design	Christopher Kennedy	Nominated

^{1} Shared award with The Babadook
