= North Sydney Demonstration School =

Coordinates: 33°50′05″S 151°12′13″E

- Cnr Bay Road & Pacific Highway; Waverton, New South Wales; Australia

Information
- Type: Demonstration school
- Motto: Towards the Highest
- School district: Waverton, New South Wales
- Educational authority: Department of Education
- Principal: Fiona Davis
- Grades: Kindergarten through 6th grade
- Affiliation: University of Sydney
- Website: Link

North Sydney Demonstration School (NSDS) is a primary school located in Waverton, New South Wales, Australia. It is one of only three demonstration schools in New South Wales.

== Overview ==
Structured education levels provided at North Sydney Demonstration School range from kindergarten to sixth grade. North Sydney Demonstration School is a school co-operating with the University of Sydney, in partnership the school and university foster and support the use of evidence based and innovative teaching practices to ensure a quality 21st century education for all. The school also actively participates in data collection for educational research projects and in the development of educational materials. North Sydney Demonstration School is situated on the land which was owned by Lady Hay and Alexander Berry. Before the school was called North Sydney Public School, it was known as Greenwood's School. there is a band where years 3 to 6 can join to play different instruments.

== Notable alumni ==
- Dan Wyllie (born 1970), actor (Love My Way, No Activity)
