= All This Mayhem =

2014 documentary film

- Directed by: Eddie Martin
- Produced by: Eddie Martin; James Gay-Rees; George Pank
- Starring: Tas Pappas; Ben Pappas
- Cinematography: Germain McMicking
- Edited by: Chris King
- Music by: Jed Kurzel
- Release date: 2014
- Running time: 104 minutes
- Country: Australia
- Language: English

All This Mayhem is a 2014 Australian documentary film on professional skateboarders Tas and Ben Pappas. It tells the story of their rise to the top two in the sport and their fall into drugs, smuggling, prison and for Ben, murder.

== Reception ==
On review aggregator Rotten Tomatoes, the film has an approval rating of 100% based on 18 reviews.

Peter Bradshaw of the Guardian gave it 3 stars and wrote "Here is a skateboarding documentary with a meaty story to tell – though sometimes it strays suspiciously far from objectivity." Empire's Simon Crook gave it 3 stars with a verdict of "Candid and clear-eyed, this doc will wow boarding fans but has something to offer to the unconverted too." Donald Clarke, contributing to The Irish Times, gave it four star. He singled out Chris King's editing for praise and said "these sorts of pictures thrive on effective montage, and King is proving himself a master of the art." Writing in the Telegraph Tim Robey says "There’s something depressing about near-fame when its sequel, which the film dumps in our lap with alarming haste, is addiction, poverty and horrifying violence against women. Compulsive though the Pappas saga is, there’s too much grime, not quite enough glory."

== Awards ==
- 4th AACTA Awards
  - Best Direction in a Documentary - Eddie Martin - won
  - Best Editing in a Documentary - Chris King - won
  - Best Original Music Score in a Documentary - Jed Kurzel - won
  - Best Feature Length Documentary - George Pank, Eddie Martin, James Gay-Rees - nominated
