= Daniel Wyllie =

Australian actor (active 1990– )

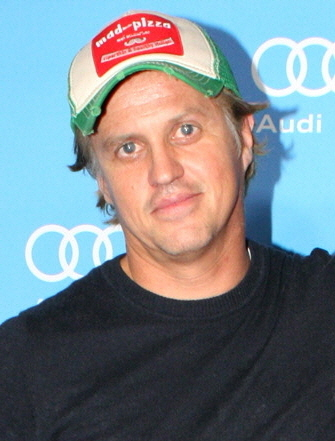
- Wyllie in 2013
- Born: 10 February 1970; Sydney, New South Wales, Australia
- Occupation: Actor
- Years active: 1990–present
- Awards: Silver Logie for Most Outstanding Actor in a Drama Series (2004)

Daniel Wyllie is an Australian stage, film, and television actor. Wyllie began acting in theatre.

== Early life and education ==
Wyllie grew up on Sydney's North Shore. He attended North Sydney Demonstration School and North Sydney Boys High School where he studied drama at high school and undertook drama classes on weekends.

Upon graduating from high school, Wyllie attended the University of New South Wales, where he studied an arts degree for two years, but did not complete the course. While at university, he took part in amateur productions with the Australian Theatre for Young People (ATYP), and while his involvement led to professional work, Wyllie considers himself untrained and never considered himself an actor until he was in his late 20s.

After university, Wyllie moved to Sydney's eastern suburbs.

At the age of 18, Wyllie was involved in a car accident which knocked out his front four teeth and left him with a scarred mouth.

== Career ==
Wyllie began his career in theatre. While still at university, and performing in amateur theatre with ATYP, an agent put out a call, looking to cast adolescent parts for 1991 film Spotswood. This saw him land his first screen acting role, alongside Anthony Hopkins, Ben Mendelsohn, Russell Crowe, and Toni Collette. The following year, he played neo-Nazi skinhead Cackles in Romper Stomper alongside Crowe, who got Wyllie his first agent.

He appeared opposite Toni Collette (whom he counts as a close friend) again, in two more films – comedy-drama Muriel's Wedding (1994) and Così (1996) based on the play by Louis Nowra, the latter film also reuniting him with Ben Mendelsohn. From there, he had roles in 1998 American war epic The Thin Red Line, 1999 Jane Campion independent romantic comedy-drama Holy Smoke!, opposite Kate Winslet and Harvey Keitel and 2000 crime drama Chopper alongside Eric Bana.

Wyllie continued to work in theatre, originating the role of Fish Lamb in the landmark production of Cloudstreet, based on the novel by Tim Winton, which toured both nationally and internationally in 1998, 1999 and 2001.

From 2002 to 2003, Wyllie played the lead role of Detective Constable Lou Knutt in detective comedy series Bad Cop, Bad Cop, alongside Michael Caton's Detective Sergeant Red Lilywhite. He also played the lead role of real life Perth serial killer Eric Cooke in 2003 ABC miniseries The Shark Net, an adaptation of the memoir by Robert Drewe. He landed the role after he was recommended to the producer by Ben Mendelsohn, who was originally targeted for the role.

Wyllie featured in the almost long take 2003 video clip for alternative rock duo The Sleepy Jackson's Good Dancers, playing a janitor. He also appeared in a 2003 stage production of The Lieutenant of Inishmore, with Sydney's Company B Belvoir.

From 2004 to 2007, Wyllie played a main role as Charlie Jackson in all three seasons of the drama series Love My Way, opposite Claudia Karvan, Asher Keddie and Brendan Cowell. The role saw him nominated for a Silver Logie for Most Outstanding Actor in a Drama Series for three consecutive years, from 2005 to 2007 – winning in 2006. He also received Australian Film Institute Awards nominations for his portrayal in 2005, 2006 and 2007.

Wyllie next played the role of Brendan Tully in 2007 drama miniseries Bastard Boys, telling the story of the biggest industrial dispute in Australia. The following year, he had a role in the first series of the critically-acclaimed Underbelly crime drama franchise, as 'Mad' Richard Mladenich. He also appeared in a Belvoir stage production of The Pillowman in 2008.

In 2010, he appeared in the role of Ezra White (one he had previously played in short drama film Ezra White, LL.B.), the family's lawyer, in David Michôd's Australian crime drama Animal Kingdom. He appeared alongside an all-star cast including Ben Mendelsohn, Jacki Weaver, Joel Edgerton and Guy Pearce.

Following this, he featured in season three of drama series Tangle in 2011, in the guest role of Michael Chubievsky. The same year, he had a role in the James Cameron-produced 2011 action thriller film Sanctum with Richard Roxburgh.

In 2012, Wyllie appeared alongside Julian McMahon and Xavier Samuel, as an armed robber in Australian 3D horror film Bait 3D. He also appeared in an episode of The Straits playing Jojo. The same year, he joined the cast of Puberty Blues as Roger Knight, playing the role through to 2014. He was nominated for an AACTA Award for Best Guest or Supporting Actor in a Television Drama for his performance in episode four.

In 2013, Wyllie had a recurring role in another installment of the Underbelly franchise, Underbelly: Squizzy, playing the role of Detective Frederick Piggott. The same year, he also appeared in Rake as convicted murderer Malcolm Finnane, who is the sensitive cellmate of Cleaver Greene, played by Richard Roxburgh. The role saw him nominated for a 2015 AACTA Award for Best Guest or Supporting Actor in a Television Drama for a season 2 episode.

In 2014, Wyllie starred in Rolf de Heer's feature film Charlie's Country and played opposite Russell Crowe as Captain Charles Brindley in The Water Diviner, also directed by Crowe. He then played federal police officer, Lyndon Joyce in drama series The Code, in 2015.

From 2015 to 2016, Wyllie starred opposite David Field as henchman Jimmy in No Activity, earning him a 2016 Logie nomination for Most Outstanding Supporting Actor. The US created a remake of the series, starring Jesse Plemons and the Jason Mantzoukas. That same year, Wyllie appeared in Foxtel's political thriller, Secret City, as Mal Paxton, the Minister for Defence in the Australian Government. He also had a recurring guest role in comedy-drama series Offspring, reuniting with Asher Keddie, his former onscreen wife (Julia) from Love My Way, as a love interest for her character Nina.

In 2018, Wyllie appeared in six-part miniseries Romper Stomper, created as a sequel to the 1992 film of the same name, reprising his role, but with the older version of the character now being known as 'Vic'. The series was set 25 years after the events in the film. He was nominated for Best Guest or Supporting Actor in a Drama at the 2018 AACTA Awards. He followed this with a recurring role in the reboot of SeaChange in 2019, having been cast as craft brewer, Ben Russo at the request of Sigrid Thornton (the series main actress), as a love interest for her character Laura.

In 2021, Wyllie appeared in eight-part drama series Wakefield as James Matos, a businessman struggling to run his company while a hospital patient for three weeks. Most recently, he appeared in the Australian Netflix series Territory in 2024, playing the role of Hank Hodge.

Wyllie is set to appear in upcoming film The Entertainment System Is Down, with Keanu Reeves and Kirsten Dunst.

Additionally, Wyllie has performed regular voiceover work, most notably as the character B2 in children's series Bananas in Pyjamas. He has also voiced for several cartoon series including Hairy Legs, Kangaroo Creek Gang, Tracey McBean and Sea Princesses. He has narrated several audio books, including Tim Winton's Breath, Chris Womersley’s The Low Road and Bereft, and One Thing Led to Another by Mark ‘Chopper’ Read.

== Personal life ==
In 2015, Wyllie married theatre and screen director Shannon Murphy, after having dated for six years. The ceremony was held at Anantura Bophut Resort & Spa in Koh Samui, Thailand, with actors Toni Collette and Krew Boylan in attendance. The same year, the pair had a daughter.

In 2021, Wyllie was found not guilty of assaulting his wife at their Sydney home a year earlier. Toni Collette appeared on the witness stand, vouching for his character.

== Filmography ==
=== Film ===
Year	Title	Role	Notes	Ref.
1992	Spotswood (aka The Efficiency Expert)	Frank Fletcher	Feature film	
1992	Romper Stomper	Cackles	Feature film	
1992	Drive	Nick	Short film	
1994	Muriel's Wedding	Perry Heslop	Feature film	
1994	The Roly Poly Man	Aggro Graffitist	Feature film	
1996	Cosi	Closed Ward Nurse	Feature film	
1997	The IMAX Nutcracker	Frederick	Short film	
1998	The Thin Red Line	Medic No. 1	Feature film	
1999	Redball	Ronny Spinks		
1999	Holy Smoke!	Robbie Barron	Feature film	
2000	Chopper	Bluey	Feature film	
2002	Unconditional Love	Pete	Feature film	
2003	Martha's New Coat	Frank		
2003	Peter Pan	Alf Mason (Pirate Crew)	Feature film	
2004	The Money	Brett	Short film	
2006	Ezra White, LL.B.	Ezra White	Short film	
2007	Lucky Miles	Policeman No. 2	Feature film	
2008	You Better Watch Out	Balaclava	Short film	
2008	The Last Confession of Alexander Pearce	Robert Greenhill	Feature film	
2009	The Edge of Reality	Barry Duvall	Short film	
2010	Animal Kingdom	Ezra White	Feature film	
2010	Not Even a Mouse	Brad	Short film	
2011	Sanctum	Crazy George	Feature film	
2011	The Hunter	Pool Player (Bearded Man)	Feature film	
2011	Burning Man	Darren	Feature film	
2012	The King is Dead	Max	Feature film	
2012	Bait 3D	Kirby	Feature film	
2013	The Turning	Vic Lang	Anthology film, segment: "Defender"	
2013	Charlie's Country	Community Doctor	Feature film	
2014	The Water Diviner	Captain Charles Brindley	Feature film	
2017	Jasper Jones	Wes Bucktin	Feature film	
2017	War Machine	Pope (uncredited)	Feature film	
2019	Dirt Music	Rusty	Feature film	
2020	Go Karts	Barry	Feature film	
TBA	The Entertainment System Is Down		Feature film, Post-production	

=== Television ===
Year	Title	Role	Notes	Ref
1992	A Country Practice	Danny Coote	2 episodes	
1993	Police Rescue	Owen	1 episode	
1997	Murder Call	Rorie Coombe	1 episode	
1999	Water Rats	Ron Mortlock	1 episode	
2001–2006	Tracey McBean	Jake McConnolly / Gordon McBean	Main cast, 75 episodes	
2002–2003	Bad Cop, Bad Cop	Det. Const. Lou Knutt	8 episodes	
2003	The Shark Net	Eric Cooke	Miniseries	
2004–2007	Love My Way	Charlie Jackson	Main cast, 30 episodes	
2006	Two Twisted	Angus Wilder	Season 1, episode 9	
2007	Bastard Boys	Brendan Tully	Miniseries	
2008	Underbelly	'Mad' Richard Mladenich	2 episodes	
2009	My Place	Victoria's Father	Episode: "1888 Victoria"	
2009	Chandon Pictures	Tracks Wilcox	Episode: "Rockstar"	
2010	Wilfred	Goldy	Episode: "Dog of a Town: Part 1"	
2011	SLiDE	Joe	Episode 8	
2011–2013	Bananas in Pyjamas	B2 (voice role)		
2012	The Straits	JoJo	Episode: "The Trouble with Raskols"	
2012	Tangle	Michael Chubievsky	5 episodes	
2012−2014	Puberty Blues	Roger Knight	Main cast 17 episodes	
2013	Underbelly: Squizzy	Det. Frederick Piggott	6 episodes	
2013	Miss Fisher's Murder Mysteries	Gerald McNaster	Episode: "Dead Man's Chest"	
2013–2014	It's a Date	Kane	2 episodes	
2014	Rake	Malcolm Finnane	2 episodes	
2014	The Code	Lyndon Joyce	6 episodes	
2015	Gallipoli	Major Steven Midgely	Miniseries, 2 episodes	
2015	Deadline Gallipoli	Captain Frank Elliot	Miniseries, 1 episode	
2015	The Beautiful Lie	Nick Levin	Miniseries	
2015−2016	No Activity	Jimmy	10 episodes	
2016	Secret City	Mal Paxton	6 episodes	
2016	Offspring	Dr. Angus Freeman	5 episodes	
2017	Blue Murder: Killer Cop	Michael Hurley	2 episodes	
2018	Romper Stomper	Vic	6 episodes	
2018	True Story with Hamish & Andy	Greg	1 episode	
2019	SeaChange	Ben Russo	8 episodes	
2020	The Great	Garry Ilyich Brezhnev	1 episode	
2021	Wakefield	James	6 episodes	
2023	Wolf Like Me	Homeless Man	2 episodes	
2024	The Veil	Guy	3 episodes	
2024	Territory	Hank Hodge	TV series	
2026	The F Ward	Curtis Parker	TV series	

=== Theatre ===
Year	Title	Role	Notes	Ref.
1991	Australia Felix	Willie	Stables Theatre, Sydney with Griffin Theatre Company	
1991	Child Dancing		Stables Theatre, Sydney with Griffin Theatre Company	
1992	Criminals in Love		Crossroads Theatre, Sydney for Missing Link Productions	
1993	A Prayer for Wings		Lookout Theatre, Sydney	
1995	Blackrock	Davo	Wharf Theatre, Sydney with STC	
1996	The Alchemist	Kastril	Belvoir St Theatre, Sydney	
1998	A-Framed		Old Fitz Theatre, Sydney with Shadowfax Entertainment	
1998–1999; 2001	Cloudstreet	Fish Lamb	Australian tour, Olivier Theatre, London, Harvey Lichtenstein Theater, New York	
2000	The Small Poppies		Belvoir St Theatre, Sydney	
2000	Suddenly Last Summer	George Holy	Belvoir St Theatre, Sydney	
2000	Twelfth Night	Sir Andrew Aguecheek	Belvoir St Theatre, Sydney	
2003	The Lieutenant of Inishmore	Padraic	Belvoir St Theatre, Sydney	
2005	Bed		Wharf Theatre, Sydney with STC	
2007	The Pillowman	Michael	MTC	
2008	Don Juan in Soho	Don Juan	Fairfax Studio, Melbourne with MTC	
2008	The Pillowman	Ariel	Belvoir St Theatre, Sydney	
2009	Gethsemane	Geoff Benzine	Belvoir St Theatre, Sydney	
2010	The Slow Sword		Wharf Theatre, Sydney with STC	
2011	Summer of the Seventeenth Doll	Barney	Belvoir St Theatre, Sydney	
2014	The Wild Duck	Gregers	UK tour with Belvoir Theatre Company & Barbican Centre, London	

== Awards ==
Year	Work	Award	Category	Result	Ref.
2005	Love My Way	Logie Award	Silver Logie for Most Outstanding Actor in a Drama Series	Nominated	
2005	Love My Way	ASTRA Award	Most Outstanding On-Camera Performance	Won	
2005	Love My Way	AFI Award	Best Lead Actor in a Television Drama	Nominated	
2006	Love My Way	AFI Award	Best Lead Actor in a Television Drama	Nominated	
2006	Love My Way	ASTRA Award	Most Outstanding Performance by an Actor	Won	
2006	Love My Way	Logie Award	Silver Logie for Most Outstanding Actor in a Drama Series	Won	
2007	Love My Way	Logie Award	Silver Logie for Most Outstanding Actor in a Drama Series	Nominated	
2007	Love My Way	ASTRA Award	Most Outstanding Performance by an Actor	Won	
2008	Love My Way	ASTRA Award	Most Outstanding Performance by an Actor	Nominated	
2013	Puberty Blues (episode #1.4)	AACTA Award	Best Guest or Supporting Actor in a Television Drama	Nominated	
2014	Puberty Blues	Equity Ensemble Award	Outstanding Performance by an Ensemble in a Drama Series	Nominated	
2014	Underbelly: Squizzy	Equity Ensemble Award	Outstanding Performance by an Ensemble in a Miniseries or Telemovie	Nominated	
2015	Rake (season 2, episode 1)	AACTA Award	Best Guest or Supporting Actor in a Television Drama	Nominated	
2016	No Activity	Logie Award	Most Outstanding Supporting Actor	Nominated	
2018	Romper Stomper	AACTA Award	Best Guest or Supporting Actor in a Drama	Nominated	
2019	No Activity (episode: "The Night Before Christmas")	Equity Ensemble Award	Outstanding Performance by an Ensemble in a Miniseries or Telemovie	Nominated	
