= 4th AACTA Awards =

Australian film and television awards ceremony

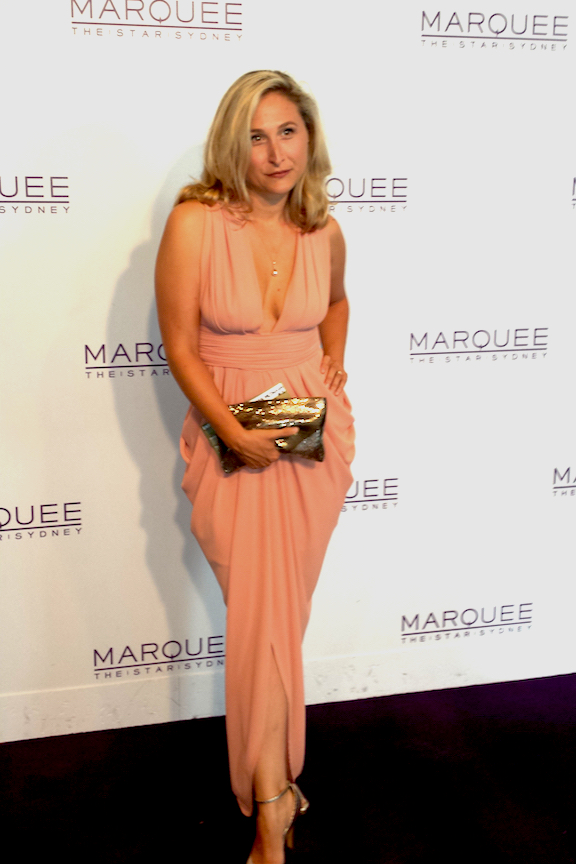
- Ally McTavish at 2015 AACТА Awards, Sydney, Australia
- Date: 27 January 2015 and 29 January 2015
- Site: The Star Event Centre; Sydney, New South Wales
- Hosted by: Cate Blanchett and Deborah Mailman

Highlights
- Best Film: The Babadook; The Water Diviner
- Most awards: Predestination (4)
- Most nominations: Film: Predestination (9) & The Water Diviner (9); TV: The Code (10)

Television coverage
- Network: Network Ten; Arena
- Ratings: 297,000

The 4th Australian Academy of Cinema and Television Arts Awards (generally known as AACTA Awards) are a series of awards which includes the 4th AACTA Awards Luncheon, the 4th AACTA Awards ceremony and the 4th AACTA International Awards. The former two events will be held at The Star Event Centre, in Sydney, New South Wales in late January 2015. Presented by the Australian Academy of Cinema and Television Arts (AACTA), the awards will celebrate the best in Australian feature film, television, documentary and short film productions of 2014. The AACTA Awards ceremony will be televised on Network Ten for the third year running. The 4th AACTA Awards are a continuum of the Australian Film Institute Awards (known as the AFI Awards), established in 1958 and presented until 2010 after which it was rebranded the AACTA Awards when the Australian Film Institute (AFI) established AACTA in 2011.

The nominees were announced during a press conference on 2 December 2014 at The Star hotel in Sydney. Predestination and The Water Diviner received the most feature-film nominations with nine, earning a nomination in most of the categories, except for Best Sound. In television, The Code gained the most nominations with ten. Ukraine is Not a Brothel earned six nominations in the documentary field.

== Background ==
=== Entry and eligibility ===
On 20 May 2014, AACTA made its first call for entrants in short film and feature film prizes for 2015, also mentioning that, unlike previous years, only AACTA members are allowed to submit material for nomination in all categories (documentary, feature film, short film and television). Feature film eligibility was also broadened for the 4th AACTA Awards, to accept entries for films released on video on demand (VOD) and direct-to-DVD platforms, as well as films that have had one film festival screening in at least three Australian states. Films meeting the aforementioned criteria were eligible to compete alongside those that have the traditional 2–4 capital city release. Entries for the documentary categories opened on 18 June 2014 and closed on 18 July 2014.

=== Social Shorts ===
At the call for entry announcement, the Academy also revealed a new short film initiative called "Social Shorts". The program allowed the films not nominated in any of the short film categories to be seen by the public via the AACTA website. It also aimed to draw attention to future filmmakers through this initiative. The shorts were split into comedy, drama and independent categories, and received acknowledgements and certifications as chosen by the general public, and AFI and AACTA members. In addition to this, the Academy announced that it the lowering of the entry fee into the official awards from A$396 in the previous year, to A$100 for shorts.

=== Categories ===
A new documentary category for Best Original Music Score was given for the first time, having previously been judged with the Best Sound in a Documentary award. The award for Best Television Comedy or Light Entertainment Series was once again split into separate prizes, for Best Television Comedy Series and Best Light Entertainment Television Series, after the two categories were merged for the 3rd AACTA Awards. The Best Visual Effects award was renamed Best Visual Effects or Animation. Additionally, this category is now open to any film, television or documentary production, regardless of geography, which has had 100% of its visual effects and animation made in Australia.

== Ceremonies ==
The AACTA Awards were held over two events: the AACTA Awards Luncheon and AACTA Awards Ceremony on the 27 and 29 of January, respectively. Both presentations took place at The Star Event Centre, the latter of which was broadcast on free-to-air Network Ten for the third year running, with an encore screening on subscription television channel Arena on 31 January. The luncheon was to be presented by Angus Sampson, however, due to filming commitments he had to pull out from hosting duties and replaced by Australian actor Adam Zwar. The ceremony was presided over by Australian actresses Cate Blanchett and Deborah Mailman.

The Channel Ten broadcast was seen as a flop, rating just 297,000 viewers in a primetime slot.

== Nominees and winners ==
The first round of nominees were announced on 3 September for Best Short Animation and Best Short Fiction Film. Six days later, the nominees for Best Feature Length Documentary were revealed. The feature-films in contention were announced on 17 September with 25 films competing in the 4th AACTA Awards. The number of films in competition are up from the previous year where only 15 features competed.

The nominees for feature-films and Television were announced during a press conference on 2 December 2014 in Sydney. The nominations event was hosted by Rob Carlton and announced by Susie Porter and Dan Wyllie. Of the nominees, Peter Spierig, and Michael Spierig's sci-fi thriller Predestination and Russell Crowe's The Water Diviner received the most feature-film nominations with nine, including Best Film, Best Screenplay, Best Cinematography, Best Editing, Best Production Design and Best Costume Design. In television, The Code received the most nominations with ten. These include Best Drama Series, Best Direction in a Television Drama or Comedy, Best Screenplay in Television, Best Cinematography in Television, Best Lead Actor – Drama (double nomination) for Dan Spielman and Ashley Zukerman, and Best Guest or Supporting Actress – Drama for Chelsie Preston-Crayford, Best Editing in Television, Best Sound in Television, Best Production Design in Television and Best Original Music Score in Television.

=== Feature film ===
Winners will be listed first and highlighted in boldface.

| Best Film | Best Direction |
|---|---|
| **The Babadook – Kristina Ceyton and Kristian Molière**; **The Water Diviner – Andrew Mason, Troy Lum, and Keith Rodger**; Charlie's Country – Nils Erik Nielsen, Peter Djigirr, and Rolf de Heer; Predestination – Paddy McDonald, Tim McGahan, Peter Spierig, and Michael Spierig; The Railway Man – Chris Brown, Andy Paterson, and Bill Curbishley; Tracks – Emile Sherman, and Iain Canning | **Jennifer Kent** – **The Babadook**; Rolf de Heer – Charlie's Country; Peter Spierig, and Michael Spierig – Predestination; David Michôd – The Rover |
| Best Original Screenplay | Best Adapted Screenplay |
| **The Babadook – Jennifer Kent**; 52 Tuesdays – Matthew Cormack, and Sophie Hyde; Charlie's Country – Rolf de Heer, and David Gulpilil; The Water Diviner – Andrew Anastasios, and Andrew Knight | **The Railway Man – Frank Cottrell Boyce and Andy Paterson**, based on the novel of the same name by Eric Lomax; Predestination – Peter Spierig, and Michael Spierig, based on the short story by Robert A. Heinlein |
| Best Lead Actor | Best Lead Actress |
| **David Gulpilil** – **Charlie's Country** as Charlie; Russell Crowe – The Water Diviner as Connor; Damon Herriman – The Little Death as Dan; Guy Pearce – The Rover as Eric | **Sarah Snook – Predestination** as The Unmarried Mother; Kate Box – The Little Death as Rowena; Essie Davis – The Babadook as Amelia; Mia Wasikowska – Tracks as Robyn Davidson |
| Best Supporting Actor | Best Supporting Actress |
| **Yılmaz Erdoğan** – **The Water Diviner** as Major Hasan; Patrick Brammall – The Little Death as Richard; Robert Pattinson – The Rover as Reynolds; TJ Power – The Little Death as Sam | **Susan Prior** – **The Rover** as Dot; Erin James – The Little Death as Monica; Jacqueline McKenzie – The Water Diviner as Eliza; Kate Mulvany – The Little Death as Evie |
| Best Cinematography | Best Editing |
| **Predestination** – **Ben Nott ACS**; Fell – Marden Dean; The Railway Man – Gary Phillips ACS; Tracks – Mandy Walker ASC ACS | **Predestination** – **Matt Villa ASE**; 52 Tuesdays – Bryan Mason; The Babadook – Simon Njoo; The Water Diviner – Matt Villa ASE |
| Best Original Music Score | Best Sound |
| **The Railway Man** – **David Hirschfelder**; Healing – David Hirschfelder; Predestination – Peter Spierig; The Rover – Sam Petty and Antony Partos | **The Rover** – **Sam Petty**, **Des Kenneally**, **Justine Angus**, **Brooke Trezise**, **Francis Ward Lindsay**, and **Robert Mackenzie**; Charlie's Country – James Currie, and Tom Heuzenroeder; Felony – William Ward, Andrew Plain, Grant Shepherd, and Robert Mackenzie; The Railway Man – Andrew Plain, Gethin Creagh, Craig Walmsley, and Colin Nicolson |
| Best Production Design | Best Costume Design |
| **Predestination** – **Matthew Putland**; The Babadook – Alex Holmes; The Rover – Josephine Ford; The Water Diviner – Christopher Kennedy | **The Water Diviner** – **Tess Schofield**; Predestination – Wendy Cork; The Railway Man – Lizzy Gardiner; Tracks – Mariot Kerr |

=== Television ===
| Best Drama Series | Best Comedy Series |
|---|---|
| **The Code** – **Shelley Birse, David Maher, and David Taylor (ABC)**; Janet King – Karl Zwicky and Lisa Scott (ABC); Puberty Blues (Season 2) – John Edwards and Imogen Banks (Network Ten); Rake (Series 3) – Ian Collie, Peter Duncan, and Richard Roxburgh (ABC) | **Utopia – Santo Cilauro, Tom Gleisner, Michael Hirsh, and Rob Sitch (ABC)**; It's a Date (Series 2) – Laura Waters, Andrea Denholm, Paul Walton, and Peter Helliar (ABC); The Moodys – Chloe Rickard and Jason Burrows (ABC); Please Like Me – Todd Abbott, Josh Thomas, and Kevin Whyte (ABC2); Shaun Micallef's Mad as Hell (Series 6) – Peter Beck and Shaun Micallef (ABC) |
| Best Children's Series | Best Light Entertainment Series |
| **The Flamin' Thongs** – **Colin South and Keith Saggers** **(ABC3)**; Get Ace – D.J. McPherson and Jack Christian (Eleven); Sam Fox: Extreme Adventures – Michael Bourchier, Suzanne Ryan, Cherrie Bottger, and Arne Lohmann (Eleven); Worst Year of My Life Again – Ross Allsop and Bernadette O'Mahony (ABC3) | **Hamish & Andy's Gap Year: South America** – **Tim Bartley, Sophia Mogford, Frank Bruzzese, and Ryan Shelton (Nine Network)**; The Checkout – Julian Morrow, Nick Murray, and Martin Robertson (ABC); Paddock to Plate (Series 1) – Rod Parker (Foxtel – Lifestyle); The Project – Craig Campbell (Network Ten) |
| Best Reality Series | Best Telefeature, Mini Series or Short Run Series |
| **The Voice – Julie Ward (Nine Network)**; MasterChef Australia (series 6) – Margaret Bashfield, Dave Forrester, David McDonald, and Keely Sonntag (Network Ten); The Voice Kids – Julie Ward (Nine Network); The X Factor – Jonathon Summerhayes (Seven Network) | **Devil's Playground** – **Helen Bowden, Penny Chapman, and Blake Ayshford** (Foxtel – Showcase); Carlotta – Riccardo Pellizzeri and Lara Radulovich (ABC); INXS: Never Tear Us Apart – Mark Fennessy, Rory Callaghan, Kerrie Mainwaring, and Andrew Prowse (Seven Network); Secrets & Lies – Tracey Robertson, Leigh McGrath, and Nathan Mayfield (Network Ten) |
| Best Direction in a Drama or Comedy | Best Direction in a Television Light Entertainment or Reality Series |
| **Shawn Seet – The Code (Episode 1) (ABC)**; Tony Krawitz – Devil's Playground (Episode 1.4: The Forgiveness of Sins) (Foxtel – Showcase); Daina Reid – INXS: Never Tear Us Apart (Part 1) (Seven Network); Matthew Saville – Please Like Me (Episode 2/07: Scroggin) (ABC2) | **Beck Cole and Craig Anderson**– **Black Comedy** **(Episode 3) (ABC)**; Tim Bartley – Hamish & Andy's Gap Year: South America (Episode 1: Week 1) (Nine Network); Michael Venables – MasterChef Australia (series 6) (Episode 60: Grand Finale) (Network Ten); Peter Ots – The Voice (Episode 1: Blind Audition #1) (Nine Network) |
| Best Lead Actor – Drama | Best Lead Actress – Drama |
| **Ashley Zukerman** – **The Code (ABC)**; Luke Arnold – INXS: Never Tear Us Apart (Seven Network); Richard Roxburgh – Rake (Series 3) (ABC); Dan Spielman – The Code (ABC) | **Marta Dusseldorp** – **Janet King (ABC)**; Danielle Cormack – Wentworth (Series 2) (Episode 11: Into The Night) (Foxtel – SoHo); Ashleigh Cummings – Puberty Blues (Season 2) (Network Ten); Kat Stewart – Offspring (Network Ten) |
| Best Guest or Supporting Actor – Drama | Best Guest or Supporting Actress – Drama |
| **Eamon Farren – Carlotta (ABC)**; Andrew McFarlane – Devil's Playground (Episode 1.5: The Whirlwind and The Storm) (Foxtel – Showcase); Andy Ryan – INXS: Never Tear Us Apart (Part 1) (Seven Network); Daniel Wyllie – Rake (Series 3) (Episode 1) (ABC) | **Chelsie Preston-Crayford – The Code (Episode 1) (ABC)**; Charlotte Best – Puberty Blues (Season 2) (Episode 8) (Network Ten); Piper Morrissey – Secrets & Lies (Episode 6) (Network Ten); Denise Roberts – Schapelle (Nine Network) |
| Best Comedy Performance | Best Screenplay in Television |
| **Debra Lawrance – Please Like Me (ABC2)**; Patrick Brammall – The Moodys (ABC); Celia Pacquola – Utopia (ABC); Josh Thomas – Please Like Me (ABC2) | **Josh Thomas** – **Please Like Me (Episode 2/07: Scroggin) (ABC2)**; Shelley Birse – The Code (Episode 1) (ABC); Trent O'Donnell and Phil Lloyd – The Moodys (Episode 1: Australia Day) (ABC); Peter Duncan – Rake (Series 3) (Episode 1) (ABC) |
| Best Cinematography in Television | Best Editing in Television |
| **Martin McGrath** – **The Broken Shore** **(ABC)**; Geoffrey Hall – ANZAC Girls (Episode 6: Courage) (ABC); Toby Oliver – Carlotta (ABC); Joseph Pickering – Janet King (Episode 6: Overtime) (ABC) | **Deborah Peart** – **The Code** **(Episode 1) (ABC)**; Scott Gray and Alexandre de Franceschi – The Broken Shore (ABC); Henry Dangar – Rake (Series 3) (Episode 1) (ABC); Paula Zorgdrager – The Real Housewives of Melbourne (Episode 1) (Foxtel – Arena) |
| Best Sound in Television | Best Original Music Score in Television |
| **Tom Heuzenroeder**, **Des Kenneally**, **Belinda Trimboli**, and **Pete Best** – **ANZAC Girls** **(Episode 6: Courage) (ABC)**; John McKerrow – The Broken Shore (ABC); Gerry Duffy, Danielle Wiessner, Robert Sullivan and Grant Shepherd – The Code (Episode 1) (ABC); John Wilkinson and Simon Rosenberg – Please Like Me (Episode 2/07: Scroggin) (ABC2) | **Roger Mason** – **The Code** **(Episode 1) (ABC)**; Cezary Skubiszewski – The Broken Shore (ABC); Keith C. Moore – The Flamin' Thongs (Episode 20: A Fright At The Opera) (ABC3); Jeff Lang – The Gods of Wheat Street (Episode 1: The Obligation) (ABC) |
| Best Production Design in Television | Best Costume Design in Television |
| **Murray Picknett** – **Carlotta** **(ABC)**; Scott Bird – ANZAC Girls (Episode 6: Courage) (ABC); Michelle McGahey – The Code (Episode 1) (ABC); Annie Beauchamp – Devil's Playground (Episode 1.5: The Whirlwind and The Storm) (Foxtel – Showcase) | **Jenny Miles** – **Carlotta** **(ABC)**; Jeanie Cameron – The Broken Shore (ABC); Xanthe Heubel – The Outlaw Michael Howe (ABC); Sandi Cichello – Upper Middle Bogan (ABC) |

=== Documentary ===
| Best Feature Length Documentary | Best Documentary Television Program |
|---|---|
| **Ukraine is Not a Brothel** – **Kitty Green, Jonathan auf der Heide and Michael Latham**; All This Mayhem – George Pank, Eddie Martin and James Gay-Rees; Deepsea Challenge 3D – Andrew Wight and Brett Popplewell; The Last Impresario – Nicole O'Donohue | **Kath Shelper** – **Tender** **(ABC)**; Margie Bryant, Dan Goldberg, and Adam Kay – Brilliant Creatures: Germaine, Clive, Barry & Bob (ABC); Eva Orner – The Network (SBS); Simon Steel and Debbie Cuell – Taking on the Chocolate Frog (Foxtel – STUDIO) |
| Best Direction in a Documentary | Best Cinematography in a Documentary |
| **All This Mayhem** – **Eddie Martin**; Sons & Mothers – Christopher Houghton; Tender (ABC) – Lynette Wallworth; Ukraine is Not a Brothel – Kitty Green | **Sons & Mothers** – **Aaron Gully and Maxx Corkindale**; Deepsea Challenge 3D – Jules O'Loughlin and John Stokes; Ukraine is Not a Brothel – Michael Latham; The Waler: Australia's Great War Horse – Torstein Dyrting |
| Best Editing in a Documentary | Best Sound in a Documentary |
| **All This Mayhem** – **Chris King**; Sons & Mothers – David Banbury; Tender (ABC) – Karryn de Cinque; Ukraine is Not a Brothel – Kitty Green | **Sons & Mothers** – **Des Kenneally**, **Will Sheridan**, **Pete Best**, and **Scott Illingworth**; Deepsea Challenge 3D – Chris Goodes, Steve Burgess, Andy Wright, James Ashton, and Helen Field; Tender (ABC) – Liam Egan, Sam Hayward, and Mark Cornish; Ukraine is Not a Brothel – Jed Palmer and Doron Kipen |
Best Original Music Score in a Documentary
**All This Mayhem** – **Jed Kurzel**; Deepsea Challenge 3D – Ricky Edwards, Brett Aplin, and Amy Bastow; Tender (ABC) – Nick Cave and Warren Ellis; Ukraine is Not a Brothel – Jed Palmer and Zoë Barry

=== Short film ===
| Best Short Animation | Best Short Fiction Film |
|---|---|
| **Grace Under Water** – **Anthony Lawrence**; God Squad – Nicholas Kempt and Troy Zafer; Love in the Time of March Madness – Robertino Zambrano and Melissa Johnston; The Video Dating Tape of Desmondo Ray, Aged 33 & 3/4 – Steve Baker | **Florence Has Left the Building** – **Mirrah Foulkes** and **Alex White**; Grey Bull – Khoby Rowe and Eddy Bell; The iMom – Ariel Martin and Anna Fawcett; Welcome to Iron Knob – Dave Wade and Alexandra Blue |

=== Other ===
Best Visual Effects or Animation
- **The Lego Movie – Chris McKay, Amber Naismith, Aidan Sarsfield and Grant Freckelton**
  - Walking with Dinosaurs 3D – Will Reichelt, Luke Hetherington and Emmanuel Blasset
  - The Water Diviner – David Booth, Prue Fletcher, Marc Varisco and Adam Paschke
  - X-Men: Days of Future Past – Richard Stammers, Blondel Aidoo, Cameron Waldbauer, Tim Crosbie and Adam Paschke

== Productions with multiple nominations ==
=== Feature film ===
The following feature films received multiple nominations.

- Nine: Predestination, and The Water Diviner
- Seven: The Rover
- Six: The Babadook, The Railway Man, and The Little Death
- Five: Charlie's Country
- Four: Tracks
- Two: 52 Tuesdays

=== Television ===
The following television shows received multiple nominations.

- Ten: The Code
- Six: Please Like Me
- Five: The Broken Shore, Rake (Series 3), and Carlotta
- Four: Devil's Playground
- Three: The Moodys, Puberty Blues (Season 2), INXS: Never Tear Us Apart, ANZAC Girls, and Janet King
- Two: The Flamin' Thongs, MasterChef Australia (series 6), The Voice, Secrets & Lies, Hamish & Andy's Gap Year: South America and Utopia

=== Documentaries ===
The following documentaries received multiple nominations.

- Six: Ukraine is Not a Brothel
- Five: Tender
- Four: Deepsea Challenge 3D, Sons & Mothers, and All This Mayhem
