= Ben Pappas =

Australian skateboarder

Personal information
- Nationality: Australian
- Born: Benjamin James Pappas; 13 May 1978 Melbourne, Victoria, Australia
- Died: 4 March 2007 (aged 28) Melbourne, Victoria, Australia

Sport
- Country: Australia
- Sport: Skateboarding

Benjamin James "Ben" Pappas (13 May 1978 – 4 March 2007) was a professional Australian skateboarder and younger brother of skateboarder Tas Pappas. In the late 1990s, Pappas was ranked the No. 2 skateboarder in the world; his older brother Tas was No. 1 at the same time.

== Early life ==
Ben Pappas was born in Melbourne, Australia to Bill and Kerry Pappas (nee Bardot) and he and his older brother Tasou Micah "Tas" Pappas were raised in the Melbourne suburb of St Albans. Their father was born in Egypt and is of Greek descent. In the 2014 documentary All This Mayhem, Tas Pappas said that their childhood was "pretty hectic."

== Skateboarding career ==
In October 1990, Pappas traveled to the United States for the first time and began skating in various competitions internationally. In 1992, Ben, his older brother Tas and their father moved from Melbourne to the United States so that both brothers could pursue careers in professional skateboarding. The brothers soon won sponsorship from Hardcore with clothing and skateboards provided in return for demos at shopping centres. In 1994, Ben Pappas placed sixth in the New Jersey demo. He participated in the Slam City Jam in Vancouver in 1995 and placed ninth in the event in 1997. In 1999, he placed fifth in the Mountain Dew U.S. Open, in Milwaukee, Wisconsin.

By 1996, he was ranked the #2 skateboarder in the world while his brother Tas was #1. The two quickly earned a reputation for their confrontational behaviour and partying. Around this time, both began using cocaine. In 1999, Pappas was arrested for attempting to smuggle 103 grams of cocaine into Australia in the sole of a skate shoe. As a result of the conviction, he was banned from traveling internationally for three years and his passport was seized. The conviction effectively ended his pro skateboarding career as he was no longer able to travel for competitions.

== Later years ==
After Pappas' career ended, he remained in Australia. He married in 1999, but the marriage ended in divorce after two years. For the next several years, he lived a transient lifestyle staying with friends and family. According to his older brother Tas, Pappas had become depressed and frustrated over his career ending and began using heroin. From May to September 2006, he was treated for anxiety and depression.

In March 2005, Pappas began dating Lynette Phillips, a recovering drug addict who was studying to be a drug counselor at Swinburne University. The two moved in together but the relationship was tumultuous and violent as Pappas was reportedly physically abusive and controlling. The two broke up several times. In February 2006, Phillips was granted an interim intervention order against Pappas after he physically assaulted her and damaged her property. The order was revoked the following month at Phillips' request after the two reconciled. At the time of Pappas' death, he and Phillips had reportedly broken up again.

== Death ==
On 24 February 2007, Pappas' on-off girlfriend Lynette Phillips disappeared. On 2 March, her body was found wrapped in a quilt in Dights Falls on the Yarra River. She had been weighted down with a backpack containing two four kilogram dumbbells. An autopsy determined that Phillips had been strangled. Pappas became the sole suspect as he was the last person seen with Phillips before her body was discovered, and the quilt and dumbbells found on Phillips' body belonged to Pappas. Police issued a statewide bulletin to locate Pappas for questioning.

On 3 March, Pappas admitted himself to the emergency room at The Alfred Hospital where he told staff that he was experiencing suicidal thoughts. After a few hours, Pappas told staff that the thoughts had subsided and he was released. He returned to the home of a friend with whom he had been staying. The following day, the friend with whom Pappas' was staying said he told Pappas about the discovery of Phillips' body. According to the friend, Pappas indicated he had already learned of Phillips' death through another friend. The two later had a conversation in which Pappas said he could not remember what happened the day of Phillips' death (24 February) and only recalled waking up on a bench and then taking a large quantity of Xanax. Later that evening, Pappas left his friend's home and was never heard from again. Six days later, on 10 March, his body was found floating under the pier of the Victoria Dock.

In 2012, a coroner's inquest determined that Pappas killed Lynette Phillips and had drowned himself after her body was found. A psychologist who treated Pappas before his death noted that he had shown signs of "suicidal ideation, homicidal tendencies, and psychotic-related symptoms such as paranoia, anger and frustration."

== Film ==
In 2011, the Pappas family and close friends launched a Facebook campaign to stop production of a documentary funded by Film Victoria with the working title Gnarly: The Ben Pappas Story. Pappas' friends and family said they wanted to stop production on the film as they did "not want to see Ben's life story sensationalized in this exploitative manor [sic]". Mike Hall, the film's producer, abandoned the project in October 2011.
