= Let the Right One In =

Let the Right One In may refer to:

== Novel ==
- Let the Right One In (novel), a 2004 Swedish vampire fiction novel by John Ajvide Lindqvist

== Stage and screen adaptations ==
=== Films and TV ===
- Let the Right One In (film), a 2008 Swedish film based on the John Lindqvist novel
- Let Me In (film), a 2010 English-language film directed by Matt Reeves, based on both the novel and 2008 film
- Let the Right One In (TV series), a 2022 television series inspired by the Lindqvist novel

=== Plays ===
- Let the Right One In, a 2011 play adapted from the 2004 novel by Lindqvist himself
- Let the Right One In (Thorne play) a 2013 play adapted from the 2004 novel by Jack Thorne

== Music ==
- "Let the Right One In", a 2009 song by the band Aiden from the album Knives
- "Let the Right One In" (The Vampire Diaries), a 2010 episode of the TV series The Vampire Diaries

== See also ==
- "Let the Right One Slip In", a 1988 song by Morrissey, from the album Viva Hate, which inspired the name of Lindqvist's novel
- Let the Wrong One In, 2021 Irish horror comedy film
