= LG Action Sports World Tour =

The LG Action Sports World Tour is the global professional action sports circuit, featuring skateboarding, inline skating, freeskiing, BMX and freestyle motocross. The Tour culminates in the LG Action Sports World Championships in October. The LG Action Sports World Tour started in 2003.

In America, the competitions are broadcast on CBS and OLN.

Contest results are published in Sports Illustrated For Kids Action Sports by Matt Higgins.

== Featured Sports ==
The LG Action Sports World Tour features five sports.

- BMX
  - Street: Riders have 65 seconds to put together the best possible run on a park course made up of transitioned and banked ramps, jumps and other simulated street obstacles. Runs are judged on amplitude, use of the course, consistency and difficulty of tricks.
  - Vert: Riders have 60 seconds to put together their best run on a vertical half-pipe. Runs are judged on amplitude, use of the ramp, consistency and difficulty of tricks.
- Inline
  - Street: Riders have 65 seconds to put together the best possible run on a park course made up of transitioned and banked ramps, jumps and other simulated street obstacles. Runs are judged on style, use of the course, consistency and difficulty of tricks.
  - Vert: Riders have 60 seconds to put together their best run on a vertical half-pipe. Runs are judged on style, use of the ramp, consistency and difficulty of tricks.
- Skateboard
  - Street: Riders have 65 seconds to put together the best possible run on a park course made up of transitioned and banked ramps, jumps and other simulated street obstacles. Runs are judged on style, use of the course, consistency and difficulty of tricks.
  - Vert: Riders have 60 seconds to put together their best run on a vertical half-pipe. Runs are judged on style, use of the ramp, consistency and difficulty of tricks.
- Freestyle Motocross: FMX features a course composed of both dirt and metal takeoff ramps and dirt landings. Riders are judged on the execution of their tricks.
- Freeski
  - Slopestyle: The park-style course combines big jumps with handrails and ledges, allowing riders to showcase their technical skills as well as their ability to get air.
  - Vert: Riders start at the top of a half pipe that has been carved into the snow. Riders will be judged on flow, height and difficulty of tricks.

== Locations ==
The tour travels to eight cities around the world.

Dates ^{1}	Site	Venue ^{2}
June 17–18	Richmond, Virginia	Tredegar Ironworks
July 14–15	Amsterdam	Dance Valley
July 29–30	Birmingham, England	NEC Arena
August 26–27	Berlin, Germany	Brandenburg Gate
September 2–3	Paris, France	Gardens of the Trocadero
September 30	Los Angeles	Pomona Fairplex
October 25–27	Dallas, Texas	Reunion Arena
