= Wednesday Night Fever =

- Created by: Rick Kalowski
- Written by: Mat Blackwell; Heath Franklin; Rick Kalowski; Steve Lynch; Sam McMillan; Ian Simmons; Joel Slack-Smith; Richard Thorp; Steve Walsh; Anne Edmonds; Tristram Baumber; Amanda Bishop; Priscilla Bonnet; Dave Eastgate; Robin Goldsworthy; Paul McCarthy; Genevieve Morris
- Directed by: Martin Coombes; Erin White
- Presented by: Sammy J
- Starring: Amanda Bishop; Paul McCarthy; Genevieve Morris; Heath Franklin
- Country of origin: Australia
- Original language: English

Production
- Executive producers: Rick Kalowski; Greg Quail

Original release
- Network: ABC1
- Release: 3 July – 14 August 2013

Wednesday Night Fever was an Australian television topical sketch satire series produced and broadcast by the ABC1. The first episode went to air on 3 July 2013.

Hosted by comedian Sammy J, the series featured a mix of live studio performances and pre-recorded sketches. These included topical impersonations, satirical characters, musical comedy and special guests in front of a live studio audience. Executive Producers are Rick Kalowski and Greg Quail who also produced comedy series At Home With Julia. The house band was heavy metal outfit Boner Contention, fronted by comedian and musician Dave Eastgate.

The show went into pre-production while Julia Gillard was still Prime Minister, and it was originally planned to include a recurring weekly topical parody of Downton Abbey (entitled "Downton Abbott"), with Tony Abbott as the Duke and Julia Gillard as the Duchess, but Gillard was deposed by Kevin Rudd shortly before the series went to air, necessitating a hasty rewrite of the sketch, and it was phased out after a few episodes.

Other notable features included a weekly musical number to close the show, featuring a cast member impersonating a well-known public figure. These included 'Clive Palmer' (played by Heath Franklin) performing a parody version of Wings' "Live and Let Die" (retitled "Live and Let Clive"), and 'Gina Rinehart' (Genevieve Morris) performing a parody of Guns N' Roses "Sweet Child o' Mine, retitled "Sweet Child o'Mines".

Future member of parliament Clive Palmer was reported to be a fan of Heath Franklin's impersonation of him, and made a cameo appearance on the show in August 2013, performing a segment that he penned himself.

The series was not renewed for a second season and concluded in August 2013.

== Cast ==
The cast features comedians and actors:

- Amanda Bishop
- Paul McCarthy
- Genevieve Morris
- Dave Eastgate
- Heath Franklin
- Anne Edmonds
- Robin Goldsworthy
- Lisa Adam

== Guests ==
- Clive Palmer
