= Matt Zeremes =

Australian actor

Matt Zeremes (aka Matthew Zeremes) is an Australian creator, actor, writer, director known for his television, theatre and film work. He was the co-creator and co-writer of the International Emmy Award-winning kids comedy TV Series Hardball for ABCME. He acted in, and directed on Season 2 of Hardball.

Zeremes graduated from the Queensland University of Technology (QUT) in 2002 with a Bachelor of Arts in acting. He wrote, produced and co-directed the feature film Burke & Wills which had its World Premiere at Tribeca Film Festival in New York with fellow QUT Graduate Oliver Torr.

He is a published children's book author. Along with Hardball collaborator, Guy Edmonds, he co-wrote the kids book series Zoo Crew and Zombie Diaries.

== Biography ==
Zeremes starred in the original stage version of Holding the Man as John Caleo for the Griffin Theatre Company in 2006, adapted from the novel of the same name by Tommy Murphy and directed by David Berhold. The original Australian production was staged in London's West End for a limited season in 2010 in which Zeremes also appeared.

Zeremes starred in the feature film All My Friends Are Leaving Brisbane in 2007 as Strangers Lovers Killers, and had small roles in Solo and Circle of Lies.

In 2014, Zeremes co-directed, the comedy musical film Super Awesome! with Guy Edmonds which they travelled to Toronto for the film's world premiere. They also created and wrote the 2019 children's television series Hardball, in which they both also appear in small roles. Hardball went on to win numerous awards including the International Emmy, the prestigious Prix Jeunesse International Award for the world's best fiction program for 7-10-year-olds. In the same month, the comedy series, produced by Northern Pictures for the ABC, in conjunction with the ACTF, Screen Australia and Create NSW, also won the Rockie Award for the Best Children & Youth Fiction Series at the Banff World Media Festival in Canada.

He co-created, with Edmonds, the 2023 children's comedy series Spooky Files.

His television credits include his role as Dr. Lachie Hatsatouris in the 2005 television series The Surgeon and Clint Mailer in Home and Away in 2009. Des Hendricks in Home and Away in 2019. Jayden Steele in Hardball. He has had guest roles in the series Underbelly, The Easy Beats mini series - Friday On My Mind (miniseries), the Paul Hogan bio-pic - Hoges, Fatal Honeymoon, Miss Fisher's Murder Mysteries, The Elegant Gentleman's Guide to Knife Fighting, Chandon Pictures and All Saints. He featured as Brimmer, in the series Secret City in 2016.
