= Spank! The Fifty Shades Parody =

- Book: Jon Blair, Ian MacIntyre, Jim Millan, Alice Moran, Colin Munch, Anne Marie Scheffler, Patrick Whalen
- Basis: Fifty Shades of Grey by E. L. James
- Premiere: October 3, 2012: CityStage; Springfield, Massachusetts
- Productions: 2013 US tour

Spank! The Fifty Shades Parody is an unauthorized musical satire of E. L. James's Fifty Shades of Grey created by Mills Entertainment. The show toured Canada, United States, and Australia. The production was directed by Jim Millan and stars three different casts consisting of three actors per cast (see actors below). The story follows an author, EBJ, as she writes a sex fantasy about a younger version of herself named Natasha Woode and a handsome billionaire, Hugh Hansen.

== Synopsis ==
With a weekend free from her husband and children, fledgling writer E. B. Janet decides to write a sex fantasy. Her story centers around a younger version of herself, Natasha Woode. Woode, a 22-year-old virgin, finds herself the object of an affection for a young billionaire Hugh Hansen, who introduces her to BDSM and erotic spanking.

== Productions ==
Spank! The Fifty Shades Parody opened in Springfield, Massachusetts in October 2012. A national US tour began touring in January 2013, with an Australian tour beginning in March 2013. The Australian production starred Rebecca De Unamuno, Stephen Mahy and Caitlin Berry.

== Cast and characters ==
Role	Original Cast	2013 US Tour	2013 Australian Tour
Natasha Woode	Alice Moran	Alice Moran; Michelle Vezilj; Danielle Trzcinski	Caitlin Berry
EBJ	Anne Marie Scheffler	Anne Marie Scheffler; Amanda Barker; Suzanne Sole	Rebecca De Unamuno
Hugh Hansen	Pat Whalen	Pat Whalen; Drew Moerlein; Gabe Bowling	Stephen Mahy
