= Micro nation =

Micro nation may refer to:

- Micronation, entities that claim to be independent nations or states.
- Micro Nation (TV series), a 2012 Australian comedy television series.
