= Double Take (Australian TV series) =

Australian sketch comedy series

- Created by: Rick Kalowski; David McDonald
- Starring: Hollie Andrew; Amanda Bishop; Helen Dallimore; Guy Edmonds; Robin Goldsworthy; Paul McCarthy; Darren Weller
- Country of origin: Australia
- No. of seasons: 1
- No. of episodes: 10

Production
- Producers: Rick Kalowski; David McDonald
- Production locations: HSV7 Melbourne; 7Two (new & repeats); 7mate (reruns)
- Running time: 22 minutes
- Production company: FremantleMedia Australia

Original release
- Network: Seven Network
- Release: 23 July – 24 September 2009

Double Take is an Australian sketch comedy series which premiered on the Seven Network on 23 July 2009. The series ended just over two months later on 24 September 2009.

It featured a number of sketches (notably, the song "9 to 9" (parodying Dolly Parton's "9 to 5") that became highly popular viral internet items, and led to the appearance of two of the programme's stars, Amanda Bishop and Paul McCarthy, in the ABC1 sitcom At Home With Julia (2011) co-written and produced by one of the show's co-creators, Rick Kalowski.

== Cast ==
- Hollie Andrew
- Amanda Bishop
- Helen Dallimore
- Guy Edmonds
- Robin Goldsworthy
- Paul McCarthy
- Darren Weller

== Format ==
Double Take involves the presentation of a variety of skits, parodying famous people and television shows. Instead of fewer, longer sketches, episodes are usually structured to include many skits with longer sketches broken up into segments often concluding after a second or third run.

== Impersonations ==
Andrew	Dallimore	Bishop	Edmonds	Goldsworthy	McCarthy	Weller
*Beyoncé; *Katie Holmes; *The Veronicas	*Natalie Bassingthwaighte; *Judi Dench (unaired); *Melissa Doyle; *Angelina Jolie; *Kerri-Anne Kennerley; *Nicole Kidman; *Kim McCosker; *Margaret Pomeranz; *Ajay Rochester; *Britney Spears; *Uma Thurman	Kerry Armstrong; *Rachael Bermingham; *Gabriella Cilmi; *Queen Elizabeth II; *Julia Gillard; *Tracy Grimshaw; *Bonnie Lythgoe; *Kate Miller-Heidke; *Roslyn Packer; *Sarah Jessica Parker; *Amy Winehouse	*Osama bin Laden; *James Dibble; *Caleb Followill; *Richard McLelland; *David Stratton; *Andrew Symonds (unaired); *John Travolta	*Julie Bishop; *Prince Harry; *Dustin Hoffman; *Sir Anthony Hopkins; *Jules Lund; *Chris Martin; *Paul McDermott; *Shannon Noll; *Kerry O'Brien; *Brad Pitt; *Ricky Ponting	*Woody Allen; *Peter Costello; *Greg Dee; *Bernie Fraser; *Bob Hawke; *John Howard; *David Koch; *Dalai Lama; *Brad McEwan; *Rove McManus; *Bert Newton; *Prince Philip; *Kevin Rudd; *Wayne Swan	*Richie Benaud; *Prince Charles; *Jason Coleman; *Daniel Craig; *Peter Garrett; *Tony Jones; *Sam Newman; *Andrew O'Keefe; *James Packer; *Kid Rock

== Notable programs ==
Double Take features original skits, parodies of other television programmes and films.

There are parodies of community television's Channel 31 or many TV shows on other networks (such as Channel 7, 9, 10, SBS and the ABC). As well as various sport coverage or news bulletins, and Australian films to classic movies.

== Reception ==
The debut episode of Double Take rated reasonably well, attracting an audience of 1.08 million people and winning the night among the coveted 25- to 54-year-old viewers' demographic. Subsequent ratings varied wildly between as many as 1,000,000 and as few as 400,000 viewers, although the show remained very popular among younger viewers throughout its run.

Surprisingly, for a sketch comedy show (typically regarded by critics as a 'low art'), Double Take was well received by reviewers writing for Australia's major broadsheet newspapers The Sydney Morning Herald, The Age and The Australian, while earning negative criticism only from the more tabloid Daily Telegraph.

Episode No.	Airdate	Ratings (in millions)	Nightly rank	Weekly rank
1	23 July 2009	1.084	11th	34th
2	30 July 2009	0.942	13th	53rd
3	6 August 2009	0.832	15th
