= Cybershack =

2006 Australian TV program

- Genre: technology
- Presented by: Faustina Agolley (2006–2007); Erin McNaught (2007–2010); Charlie Brown (2006–present); Ashley Cheadle (2010 & 2019); Janis McGavin (2010); Sara Issaka (2017–present); Josh Phillipps (2016–2018); Kristy Hocking (2017–present); Courtney Dober (2017–2018); Rupert Raineri (2018–present); Christian Heath (2018–present)
- Country of origin: Australia
- Original language: English
- No. of seasons: 26

Production
- Executive producer: Charlie Brown
- Producer: Thomas Kaye
- Editor: Perry Childs
- Running time: 30 minutes
- Production company: CBN Media

Original release
- Network: Nine Network (2008–present); Network Ten (2006–2007)
- Release: 1 August 2006 – present

CyberShack is Australia's only television program dedicated entirely to the consumer technology and home entertainment market. It provides a wealth of content; from gadgets to games to lifestyle and entertainment products. CyberShack features relevant and updated information to a mass target audience.

It airs on the Nine Network nationally and resumed broadcasting in October 2011.

== Hosts ==
- Kristy Hocking (2017–present)
- Sara Issaka (2017–present)
- Rupert Raineri (2018–present)
- Christian Heath (2018–present)
- Faustina Agolley (2006–2007)
- Erin McNaught (2007–2010)
- Charlie Brown (2006–present)
- Ashley Cheadle (2010)
- Janis McGavin (2010)
- Josh Phillipps (2015–2018)
- Courtney Dober (2017–2018)
