= Nicholas Cradock =

Australian actor

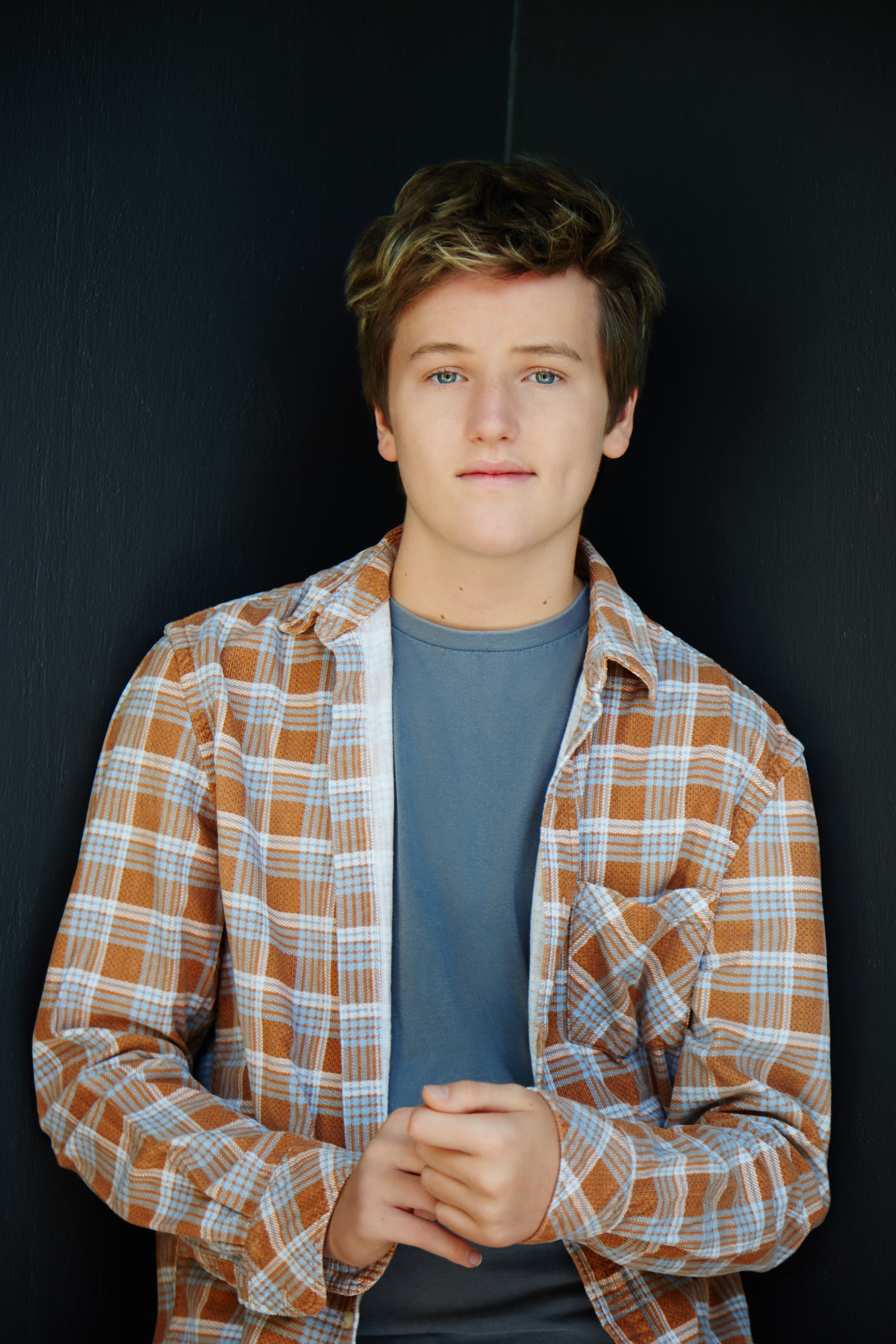
- Born: 13 May 2005 (age 21); Sydney, New South Wales, Australia
- Occupation: Actor

Nicholas Cradock is an Australian actor, most commonly known for his role in the 2014–2016 production of Les Misérables touring Australia. Cradock has performed in multiple musicals, stage plays and films. Cradock recently starred in both seasons of the Emmy Award winning program, Hardball as Lance. Cradock performed in the world premiere of Dream Lover: the Bobby Darin Musical in 2016 as Young Bobby Darrin / Dodd at the Sydney Lyric Theatre. Cradock is also known for his role on the television program Wiggle, Wiggle, Wiggle!; where he played the Mini Red Wiggle..

== Performances ==
=== Musical theatre ===
Cradock toured with the 25th anniversary production of Les Misérables around Australia as Gavroche. Cradock also toured Australia with Bonnie Lythgoe's Peter Pan. Cradock went on to feature in the world premiere of Dream Lover: the Bobby Darin Musical starring alongside David Campbell. Cradock also notably starred alongside Trevor Ashley in The Bodybag at the Sydney Opera House.

=== Short films ===
- Dreamweaver (2017)

=== Television ===
Cradock starred as the Mini Red Wiggle (Simon Pryce) in the television program Wiggle, Wiggle, Wiggle!, directed by Anthony Field. Cradock also starred as Lance in both seasons of the Emmy Award winning program Hardball. Cradock starts in Channel 7's News of the Wild.

=== Competition ===
Cradock was a finalist in the Kimmy V The Music: A Live Singing Contest (That's Live) live charity performance on YouTube on 15 May 2020. Cradock performed 'Gonna Be Famous' and 'Bunny and Kitty'. Cradock performed to Daniel Radcliffe, Tina Fey, Ellie Kemper and Tituss Burgess.
