= Gabriel Andrews =

Australian actor

- Born: Gabriel John Andrews; Sydney, Australia
- Occupation: Actor
- Years active: 1992–present
- Website: gabrielandrews.com

Gabriel Andrews is a film, television, stage, and voice actor. His recent work includes video games Kingdom Come: Deliverance II, and S.T.A.L.K.E.R. 2: Heart of Chernobyl; the films Jojo Rabbit, The Catcher Was a Spy, Zátopek; TV shows Carnival Row, Spy City, Knightfall. He also works regularly as a voice actor and stage actor.

== Career ==
Gabriel Andrews was born in Sydney where he was best known for the hundreds of roles he played on the popular sketch comedy TV show Comedy Inc. He also appeared on G.P., Water Rats, Home and Away, and All Saints, and in several films, including Children and The Time Game. He performed in many Sydney theatre productions and has done a host of readings, short stories, poems and journals for ABC Radio National, most notably a reading of Kenneth Cook's Australian classic novel Wake in Fright.

Due to his early beginnings as a professional musician and actor, he performed on all four stages of the Sydney Opera House (Concert Hall, Opera Theatre, Drama Theatre, Playhouse) by the age of seventeen.

He is also an accomplished singer and violinist - originally classically trained, he also sings and plays blues/jazz. Gabriel was born in Sydney and is a graduate of the National Institute of Dramatic Art.

He regularly performs live on stage as a member of the Cimrman English Theatre.

== Filmography ==
=== Film ===
Year	Title	Role	Type
1991	Breathing Under Water	The Singing Boy	Feature film
1991	The Time Game	Tony Johnson	TV movie
	Children	Claude Phillips	
2004	Things Wong Kar-Wai Taught Me About Love	Gabriel	Short film
2018	The Catcher Was a Spy	British Colonel	Feature film
2019	The Ash Lad: In Search of the Golden Castle	Nobleman 2	Film
2019	Jojo Rabbit	Herr Klum	Feature film
2021	Zátopek	Ron's trainer	Feature film

=== Television ===
Year	Title	Role	Type
1999	Home and Away	Angus Halliday	TV series, 4 episodes
2003-05	Comedy Inc.	Various characters	TV series
1999-2001	Water Rats	Luke / Rowan	TV series, 2 episodes
1993	G.P.	Jimmy	TV series, 1 episode
2001	All Saints	Lachlan	TV series, 1 episode
2013	Rosamunde Pilcher	Dan	TV series, 1 episode
2015	Legends	Guard	TV series, 1 episode
2018	Knightfall	King's Guard	TV series, 1 episode
2020	Spy City	Man #1	TV miniseries
2022	Dangerous Liaisons	Opera Goer	TV series, 1 episode
2023	Carnival Row	Hensloan	TV series, 1 episode

== Theatre ==
Title	Role	Theatre Co.
Long, Wide, and Short-Sighted	Sharp-Sighted	Cimrmn English Theatre
Plum	Karel	Cimrmn English Theatre
Akt	Bedřich	Cimrman English Theatre
Pub in the Glade	Professor Andrews	Cimrman English Theatre
Conquest of the North Pole	Gustav Frištenský	Cimrman English Theatre
Jack's Cake	Kevin	Kolowrat Theatre
Shakespeare’s Richard III & Julius Caesar – extracts with Professor Hilsky	LEAD – performer of all selected monologues	Ústřední knihovna, velký sál
Shakespeare’s The Merchant of Venice – extracts with Professor Hilsky	LEAD – performer of all selected monologues	Clam-Gallas Palace
Shakespeare’s Sonnets with Professor Hilsky	LEAD – performer of all selected monologues	Dejvice Theater
Deaf Empire	Salda (Smetana’s producer)	Kolowrat Theatre
Broadway Bound	Eugene Jerome	Marian Street Theatre
Gabriel	Gabriel	New Theatre
Crimes of the Heart	Barnett Lloyd	Marian Street Theatre
Arcadia	Gus/Lord Augustus	Sydney Theatre Company (Australian tour)
Daylight Saving	Jason Strutt	Marian Street Theatre
The Winslow Boy	Ronnie Winslow	Playhouse, Sydney Opera House
Great Expectations	Young Pip	Seymour Centre
