= Sam Simmons (comedian) =

Australian comedian and actor

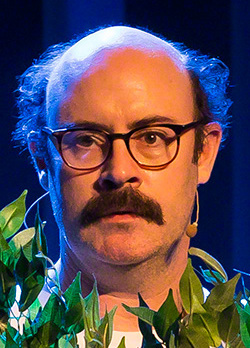
- Simmons at Crap Comedy Festival, Oslo
- Born: March 19, 1977 (age 49); Adelaide, South Australia, Australia
- Spouse: Roslyn Durnford
- Children: 1

Comedy career
- Years active: 2003–present

Sam Simmons (born 1977 or 1978) is an Australian comedian, actor, and radio and TV presenter. He has toured extensively with his stand-up shows, as well as many appearances on TV in Australia, the US, and the UK. He has won and been nominated for many awards, and won the Helpmann Award for Best Comedy Performer in 2014.

== Early life and education ==
Sam Simmons was born in 1977 or 1978 in Adelaide, South Australia.

He was raised in Adelaide by a single working mother, and has hinted in his shows that he was somewhat neglected as a child. His best friend described his childhood as "troubled". Going through a tough time as a 13-year-old, he attempted suicide.

He watched a lot of The Goodies, Monkey, and Benny Hill as a child, and says was also very influenced by John Cleese's character in Fawlty Towers, Basil Fawlty: "Rage and silliness combined. What a mix!".

== Career ==
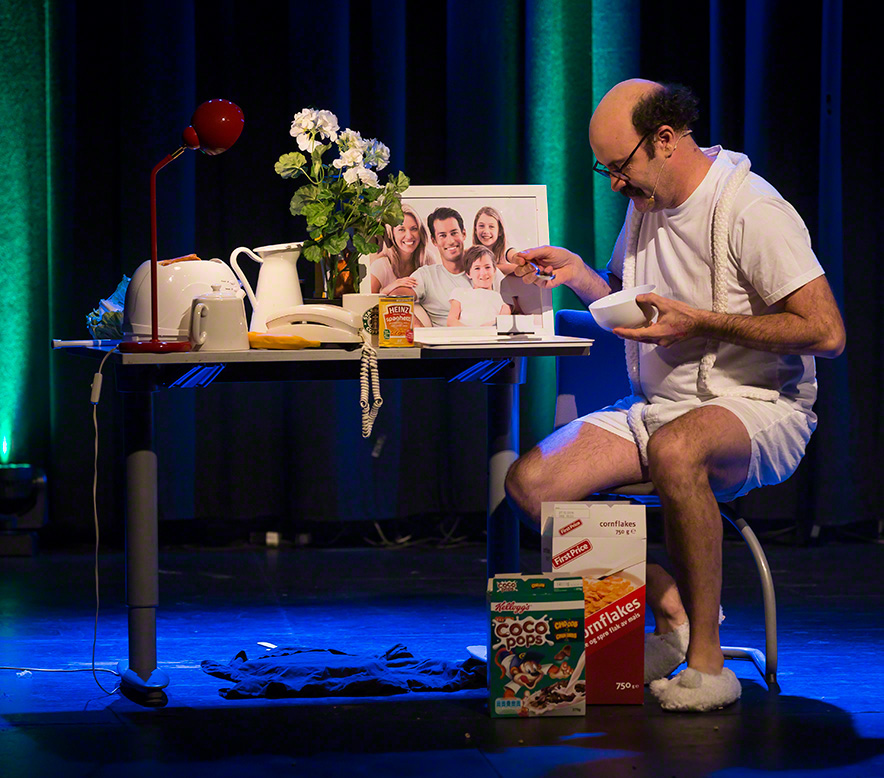
Sam Simmons's Spaghetti for Breakfast in Oslo.

=== Live ===
Simmons' first performed comedy in 2001, at a benefit show for a friend whose handbag had been stolen. Performing as a duo with another young man, they presented Smutty and Pert, like Ernie and Bert (from Sesame Street). Later, working at Greasy Joe's in St Kilda, he would perform for the patrons of the café, who were a diverse audience.

He then began to perform in comedy rooms, "just doing my own thing", which was not stand-up, according to Simmons. Janet McLeod gave him a contract to perform for two months at her Local Laughs night.

In 2003, he presented The Steve Promise Story at the Melbourne International Comedy Festival (MICF).

He performed at TEDxSydney in 2014. In the same year, he developed and performed his show Death of a Sails-Man, which one reviewer described as "an extremely quirky one-man monologue... a man live on stage having a breakdown, singing, reflecting and joking with his sub-conscious".

His 2015 award-winning show, Spaghetti for Breakfast featured his usual "silly" (self-described) pieces, followed by a deeply personal reference to how he nearly committed suicide as a young adolescent.

When in Los Angeles, he did regular shows with Doctor Brown (Phil Burgers), and they worked together on developing a TV series. In 2015, they performed together at the Soho Theatre in London, in a show called Ceremony, which Burgers described as "two idiots playing with the idea of ceremony".

In March 2016, Simmons performed a new show, Not a People Person, at MICF.

After living for some time across three cities (Sydney, Los Angeles, and London, he announced early in 2019 that he was going to quit touring with live comedy for a while after his current commitments with his new show, 26 Things You're Doing Wrong with Sam Simmons, although still intending to do some acting and write TV scripts. At several comedy festivals in 2019, Simmons performed a new show, 26 Things You're Doing Wrong with Sam Simmons about unconventional life hacks. In December 2019, he performed for 10 nights at the Soho Theatre in London, and in 2020 was working on a solo show called FUNT there.

In 2021, he performed a show in the Spiegeltent at the Adelaide Fringe entitled Sam Simmons is Putting Things on His Knee to Raise Awareness for People Who Not have Good Knees, based on fictional stories about celebrities. In 2022, he performed Be a Verb at the Garden of Unearthly Delights in the Adelaide Fringe.

In March 2024, Simmons performed his new show Man With A Fork In A World Full Of Soup at the Adelaide Fringe, which earned good reviews.

John Bailey wrote in The Sydney Morning Herald in 2016: "...an hour with Simmons is a tour of the comic spectrum: physical comedy, musical comedy, sketch and character work, puns, one-liners, shaggy dog stories, mime, crowd work, visual gags, observational comedy, meta-comedy and more, all delivered with the kind of pummelling intensity...".

=== TV and radio ===
Simmons has also made regular appearances on TV since 2003, as a stand-up comedian, as a guest, in comedy sketch shows, and as an actor (including a main role in the comedy series Squinters). Network appearances include NBC, BBC, Channel 4, Comedy Central, ABC, and other Australian networks.

He appeared on Conan in the US in 2013, after moving to Los Angeles in June of that year. Host Conan O'Brien called him "a very strange fellow". Simmons said that the US show allowed him greater freedom in presenting his "weird" stuff. He has also appeared on another American TV show, Adam Devine's House Party, as well as the British shows 8 Out of 10 Cats, Room 101.

On radio, Simmons started as a regular guest on the morning show The Pinch on Triple R (Melbourne) in 2003. He became a regular host on Triple J radio station from 2005.

He was a regular guest host and contributor on JTV from 2007 to 2009 This led to his first television show, The Urban Monkey with Murray Foote, in 2009.

In 2012, Simmons followed up with a sketch-style TV series Problems, with a tone more similar to that of his surrealist stand-up shows. After moving from Adelaide to Los Angeles, in 2013 he filmed a US pilot in Albuquerque with David Quirk, described by Simmons as "a reality show about animals".

In 2017, he provided the voice of Mr Wallaby in Peppa Pig.

In 2020, he appeared in the Australian comedy series LOL: Last one Laughing.

Since 2022 and as of March 2024, Simmons has hosted the podcast Niche as Quiche, a regular deep-dive into various niche subjects and stream-of-consciousness topics.

Simmons has appeared on the comedy quiz show Dirty Laundry Live.

On July 23, 2025, Sam Simmons appeared in Episode 15 of The 24 Hour Check-In, reviewing the Town and Country Motel in Strathfield, New South Wales. The episode features Simmons exploring the motel and surrounding area with the show's host.

== Awards and nominations ==
=== Awards ===
- 2003: Moosehead Award for The Steve Promise Story
- 2006: The Groggy Squirrel Critics' Award for Tales from the Erotic Cat
- 2008: MICF Directors' Choice Award for Where can I win a bear around here?
- 2010: MICF Golden Gibbo Award for The Incident with David Quirk
- 2010: MICF Piece of Wood Award for Fail
- 2011: Adelaide Fringe Best Comedy Award for Sam Simmons and the Precise History of Things
- 2011: The Sydney Morning Herald M Award for Best Comedy
- 2014: Sydney Comedy Festival Director's Choice Award for Death of a Sails-Man
- 2014: Helpmann Award for Best Comedy Performer
- 2015: Co-winner, Underbelly Edinburgh Award at the Adelaide Fringe, for Spaghetti For Breakfast
- 2015: Barry Award at MICF, for Spaghetti for Breakfast
- 2015: Winner, Edinburgh Fringe Comedy award, for Spaghetti for Breakfast
  - Note: The Barry Award and Edinburgh Comedy Award are regarded as the two top comedy prizes, and at this point Simmons was one of only two people ever to have won both for the same show, the other being American comedian Phil Burgers ("Doctor Brown").

=== Nominations ===
- 2003: National finalist, Triple J Raw Comedy Competition
- 2005: Golden Gibbo, MICF
- 2006: MICF Barry Award for Tales from the Erotic Cat
- 2011: MICF Barry Award for Precise History of Things
- 2011: Edinburgh Best Comedy Award for Meanwhile
- 2012: Helpmann Award for Best Comedy Performer
- 2014: Edinburgh Best Comedy Award for Death of a Sails-man

== Personal life ==
Simmons married Roslyn Durnford. In February 2019, Simmons revealed that he was father to a baby, and wanted to spend some time enjoying family life.

He said that he loves LA, with its "weird hippie thing" where he attends yoga classes and does not drink alcohol, whereas in other places he would drink too much.

He has synaesthesia.

He loves animals, and has considered a career in animal husbandry or zookeeping. He said that he would love to make animal documentaries, like David Attenborough. His oldest friend, Stuart Peevor, described him as a "generous" and "warm" person.

== Filmography ==
Television/Film
Year	Title	Role	Notes
2022	The Strange Chores	Bad Tony (voice)	14 episodes
2021	Bluey	Bob (voice)	1 episode
2021	Stand up for Mental Health	Self	TV Specials
2021	Wakefield	Pete Seamen	8 episodes
2020	Drunk History Australia	Tanky	1 episode
2018-20	Hughesy, We Have a Problem	Self	5 episodes
2018-19	Squinters	Lukas	12 episodes
2019	Mr Black	Barry Donato	1 episode
2017	Get Krack!n	Creepy Dude	3 episodes
2017	Peppa Pig: My First Cinema Experience	Mr Wallaby	
2016	Peppa Pig	Mr Wallaby (voice)	1 episode
2015-16	Drunk History	Various	2 episodes
2015	Sky Comedy Christmas Shorts	Joke Writer	1 episode
2015	No Activity	Glen	2 episodes
2015	Rotters	Ears	TV Movie
2015	Sam Simmons: Wallstud	Sam	3 episodes
2015	Alt Tab	Time of Death Man	
2014	It's A Date	Ray	1 episode
2014	Ad Nauseum	Hamish	
2012	Problems	Sam / Uncle Warrick	4 episodes
2010	Fail (Warehouse Comedy Festival standup)	Himself	DVD release
2009	The Urban Monkey	Murray Foote	11 episodes
