= Katrina Retallick =

Australian actress

- Born: Katrina Retallick
- Education: Royal Central School of Speech and Drama
- Occupation: Actress
- Years active: 2001–present
- Website: http://www.katrinaretallick.com/

Katrina Retallick is an Australian actress possibly best known for appearing on the sketch comedy, television series, Comedy Inc. between 2003 and 2006.

== Career ==
By 2001, Retallick had already been active in voice-over work, including campaigns for Racing Australia, Laubman and Pank optometry and Vodafone Message Bank. Since returning to Australia, her television credits include Backberner and CNNNN for the ABC and four series of Comedy Inc. for the Nine Network.

She also played the lead role of Nell in Seabiscuit Productions’ stage show of the Rodgers and Hammerstein musical South Pacific in Sydney in 2004.

Retallick completed a Bachelor of Arts degree at the University of Sydney and appeared in over 15 shows with the university’s dramatic society (SUDS). This was followed by studies at the Central School of Speech and Drama in London.

Her film work has included working as an in-studio reader for the animated film, Flushed Away with Hugh Jackman and Miriam Margolyes for DreamWorks Pictures.

In 2009, she appeared in commercials for Foxtel.

She has also performed in her own show on the Sun Princess cruise ship.

In 2019, Retallick took on the role of Diane Gray and others in the Melbourne production of the stage musical Come From Away.
