= Micro Nation (TV series) =

- Genre: Sitcom
- Written by: Andrew Garrick; Ben Jenkins; Alexandra Lee; David Harmon; Adam Yardley; Mark Sutton
- Directed by: Andrew Garrick
- Starring: Roz Hammond; Harriet Dyer; Daniel Cordeaux; Lliam Amor; James Mackay; John Leary; Jon Rex Williams; Rowena Wallace; David Collins; Rebecca De Unamuno; Kit Brookman; Roy Billing; Spike
- Composer: Peter Isaac
- Country of origin: Australia
- Original language: English
- No. of seasons: 1
- No. of episodes: 15

Production
- Executive producer: Maria Michael
- Producer: Linda Ujuk
- Production location: Patonga, New South Wales
- Cinematography: Matthew Chuang
- Editor: Dylan Behan
- Running time: 5 minutes
- Production company: Freehand Productions

Original release
- Network: Eleven
- Release: October 15 – November 2, 2012

Micro Nation is an Australian sitcom web television series that aired on Eleven from 15 October to 2 November 2012.

The series was created and directed by Andrew Garrick, who also wrote the screenplay with Ben Jenkins, Alexandra Lee, David Harmon, Adam Yardley and Mark Sutton.

== Synopsis ==
The series is set on the forgotten island micronation of Pullamawang and follows the adventures of its young citizen Emma who desperately wants to leave.

When Australia federated in 1901, the island of Pullamawang forgot to mail in their paperwork, and they remained a separate country. Over the years, they’ve created their own customs and rules of government without anybody outside the town really noticing.

Following the discovery of diamonds, egos, aspirations and greed are sent skyrocketing. It all culminates in an explosion of nationalistic fervour as Pullamawang declares war on Australia.

== Cast ==
- Roz Hammond as Kingess Betty Cosdosca
- Harriet Dyer as Emma Cosdosca
- Dan Cordeaux as Paul Cosdosca
- Lliam Amor as Menzies McFadden
- James Mackay as Lindsay MacFadden
- Jon Williams as Barry
- John Leary as Pete
- Rowena Wallace as Tottie Nesbit
- Rebecca De Unamuno as Chef Tracy
- David Collins as Blind Billy Mackerel
- Kit Brookman as Little Timmy
- Spike as Constable Woofster
- Roy Billing as Narrator

== Episodes ==
No.	Title	Directed by	Written by	Australian air date
1	"Meet Pullamawang"	Andrew Garrick	Unknown	15 October 2012
2	"Pullamawang's Broke"	Andrew Garrick	Unknown	16 October 2012
3	"A Strange, But Familiar Stranger"	Andrew Garrick	Unknown	17 October 2012
4	"Advance Pullamawang Fair"	Andrew Garrick	Unknown	18 October 2012
5	"There's Diamonds in These Hills!"	Andrew Garrick	Unknown	19 October 2012
6	"We're Rich!"	Andrew Garrick	Unknown	22 October 2012
7	"Conspiracy"	Andrew Garrick	Unknown	23 October 2012
8	"Diamonds: More Trouble Than They're Worth"	Andrew Garrick	Unknown	24 October 2012
9	"The Nation is Revolting"	Andrew Garrick	Unknown	25 October 2012
10	"This Means"	Andrew Garrick	Unknown	26 October 2012
11	"Bingo!"	Andrew Garrick	Unknown	29 October 2012
12	"This Means War!"	Andrew Garrick	Unknown	30 October 2012
13	"No, THIS Means War!"	Andrew Garrick	Unknown	31 October 2012
14	"Attack!"	Andrew Garrick	Unknown	1 November 2012
15	"Peace of Mind"	Andrew Garrick	Unknown	2 November 2012
