= Spooky Files =

Australian television series

- Created by: Guy Edmonds; Matt Zeremes
- Written by: Guy Edmonds; Matt Zeremes; Marisa Brown; Clem Bastow; Alberto Di Troia; Emma Gordon; Andrea Denholm; Alexander Andreotti; Tim Williams
- Directed by: Leticia Cáceres; Guy Edmonds; Craig Irvin; Matt Zeremes; Sarah Hickey
- Starring: Thomas Saddler; Audrey Salinas; Alberta Brudan
- Composer: Pascal Babare
- Country of origin: Australia
- Original language: English
- No. of seasons: 2
- No. of episodes: 20

Production
- Executive producers: Tony Ayres; Andrea Denholm; Guy Edmonds; Matt Zeremes
- Producer: Paul Watters
- Cinematography: Darrell Martin
- Running time: 24 minutes

Original release
- Network: ABC ME
- Release: October 23, 2023

Spooky Files is an Australian comedy television series for children on ABC ME. The first season debuted in 2023 with a second season beginning in 2024. It was created by Tony Ayres productions and Megaboom Pictures. It was nominated for the 2025 AACTA Award for Best Children's Program.

== Synopsis ==
Three young ghostbusters confront monsters. The monsters are manifestations of childhood fears or emotions.

== Cast ==
- Thomas Saddler as Bert
- Alberta Brudan as Xena
- Audrey Salinas as Billie
- Lennox Lee as Derek
- Guy Edmonds as John and various
- Josh Damman as Chaos
- Mina Annan as Robina
- Matt Zeremes as Jon and various
- Mario Setyana as Ed
- Rebecca Bower as Jane
- Mila Hourmouzis as Backpack Jess
