= Janis McGavin =

Australian actress and comedy performer

Janis McGavin is an Australian actress and comedy performer, best known for her roles in the popular television series Comedy Inc and Balls of Steel Australia.

== Career ==
McGavin trained at the Western Australian Academy of Performing Arts. After graduation she joined the cast of Channel Nine's Comedy Inc. This Logie-nominated, AFI award-winning television series screens internationally and is currently airing on The Comedy Channel in Australia.

In 2009, McGavin played Leanne, the lead love interest in the kooky 80s-inspired comedy series The Urban Monkey with Murray Foote. It aired on ABC2 and has built a cult following. She has also had roles in feature films such as Scooby Doo, Walk the Talk and most recently a guest appearance in the latest ABC series Laid. In 2010, McGavin was a co-host on the television show Cybershack for Channel Nine. She has also appeared in national campaigns for Nestle and Ajax.

In 2011, McGavin appeared in the Australian remake of the Channel 4 show Balls of Steel, airing on The Comedy Channel. The show requires comedians to perform outrageous public stunts in an attempt to impress a studio audience and lay claim to the title of having the biggest "Balls of Steel" for the week. In the show, she takes in the character called Fame Whore who goes to the public claiming herself to be a celebrity (with the stage name "J'anus") and does many outrageous publicity stunts.
