= Hardball (2019 TV series) =

Australian children's television series

- Genre: Family; Comedy drama
- Created by: Guy Edmonds; Matt Zeremes
- Written by: Guy Edmonds; Matt Zeremes
- Directed by: Darren Ashton; Kacie Anning; Fadia Abboud
- Composer: Adam Gok
- Country of origin: Australia
- Original language: English
- No. of seasons: 2
- No. of episodes: 23

Production
- Executive producer: Catherine Nebauer
- Producer: Joe Weatherstone
- Running time: 30 minutes
- Production company: Northern Pictures

Original release
- Network: ABC Me
- Release: April 1, 2019 – June 25, 2021

Hardball is an Australian children's television series, produced by Northern Pictures with Screen Australia in association with Create NSW and the Australian Children's Television Foundation (ACTF). It was released on the ABC Me app on April 1, 2019, and aired on April 22 on the same channel. The second season came out in 2021. The series was filmed at La Perouse Public School in La Perouse, NSW, Australia. The show follows the protagonist, Mikey, trying to get better at schoolyard handball at his new school.

== Plot ==
Mikey moves to Western Sydney, where he meets Jerry and Salwa, who want to help him win at handball. The elected school principal is Ms. Crapper and Tiffany's dads are Steele and Stone. The series focuses on the challenges the characters face while preparing for the Steele and Stone Inaugural Handball tournament (SASI WEST HAT) against other schools in season 1 and the state tournament at the end of season 2.

== Cast ==
- Semisi Cheekam as Mikey
- Reannah Hamdan as Salwa
- Holly Simon as Prisha
- Logan Reberger as Jerry
- Erin Choy as Tiffany
- Helen Dallimore as Ms. Crahper
- Daya Sao-Mafiti as Daddy
- Maria Walker as Auntie
- Sam Everingham as Viktor
- Ella Holowell as Ivanka
- Jack Scott as Kevin
- Nicholas Cradock as Lance
- Tilly Jefferson as Lily
- Taylan Gogan as Bao
- Mahdi Mourad as Mustafa
- Michael Denkha as Jim
- Jack Scott as Kevin (IT)
- Lila Tapper as Z-pop (Edie)

== Guests ==
- Guy Edmonds as Bevan Stone
- Matt Zeremes as Steele
- Wendy Strehlow as Wanda the Tuck Shop Lady/Food Truck Lady/Chip Shop Lady
- Hugo Johnstone-Burt as Connor McCaan
- Sam Alhaje as Chicken Billy
- Jay Laga'aia as Mr. Butte
- Haiha Le as Miss Bahm
- Andrew Ryan as Garry Garrison
- Madeleine Jones as Reporter

== Episodes ==
=== Season 1 (2019) ===
No. overall	No. in season	Title	Directed by	Written by	Original release date
1	1	"Across the Ditch"	Darren Ashton	Guy Edmonds & Matt Zeremes	1 April 2019
Mikey moves from New Zealand with his Dad so his father can further pursue touch football with the West Sydney Bullfrogs. Mikey and his father move in with his auntie in her garage. Auntie drives Mikey to his new school, which is called Block Street Primary school. He is late and meets the upcoming principal Ms Crapper. She introduces him to the class, and he is buddied up with Tiffany, who on the surface is nice but is horrible to new students while teachers aren't watching, and she refuses to show Mikey around the school. A disabled student named Jerry joins him at lunch and introduces Mikey to handball. Jerry encourages Mikey to play handball with the other students, and explains the rules. When Mikey plays, Tiffany is in the Ace square and serves to Mikey, and he misses after facing scolding from the other students. After break, two businessmen introduce the children to a Western Sydney handball tournament hosted by their company, Steel and Stone. Mikey is then driven home by auntie, taking a stop in the car to buy sweet Lebanese pastries from another student who is working in a bakery. Mikey practices with his father, but he can't play due to a rugby arm injury. Mikey goes to sleep in the back of a truck.
2	2	"Sorry Salwa"	Darren Ashton	Guy Edmonds & Matt Zeremes	1 April 2019
The episode opens with a futuristic spaceship shot. Mikey meets Jerry, who tells him he's late. Jerry tells Mikey to enter the maze and find the queen. Mikey encounters a minion of the queen who blocks his path. He defeats the minion and finds the queen, who is Tiffany. He is then woken up and is in his auntie's car, late for school. Mikey meets Jerry at school, who is convincing Salwa to sign up for the handball competition. Salwa then has a handball death rally with Tiffany, which she wins. Tiffany is bitter about losing, and refuses to shake Salwa's hand. After break, Tiffany is recording Ms Crapper dancing with a cardboard cutout of a rugby player in secret. They both return to class late, but Ms Crapper is in ignorance about the recording. In break, Tiffany shares the recording of Ms Crapper with other students. The recording was sent from Salwa's account, although Salwa was not the one who sent it. Mikey and Jerry go to the IT department to prove Salwa's innocence. Mikey and Jerry confront Tiffany and her friends. After school Mikey and Jerry go back to the Lebanese restaurant to talk to Salwa. Mikey and Jerry then meet Mikeys auntie, before Mikey heads home. After getting advice from his dad and auntie, he falls asleep.
3	3	"Howie the Handball Hero"	Darren Ashton	Guy Edmonds & Matt Zeremes	1 April 2019
Mikey is lost in a misty forest, but is woken up by Salwa; he was daydreaming. Mikey, Salwa, and Jerry walk to the hall, where Sydney bullfrogs players talks to the students, where Mikeys father is also present. After the Bullfrogs are finished, the students go on break where the Bullfrogs and Miss Crapper are operating a sausage sizzle. Tiffany and Salwa have a confrontation about Salwa being banned from handball, due to her false accusation in the previous episode. In Crappers office, Salwa is also banned from entering sasi-west-hat, the handball competition. Later in break, the Bullfrogs are hosting tackling competitions, where Tiffany and Talwa have another confrontation. After break, the three go back to the IT department to again prove Salwa's innocence. They go back class with no proof of innocence, where they read. Jerry and Mikey go to the quiet room, where Jerry tells Mikey about 'Howie', the son of Māui who Jerry made up. Howie turned a star into a small ball and turned it rubber, creating the first handball. After school, Mikey, his dad, and Aunty are having dinner where they talk about Howie and his dad's touch football career. Meanwhile, in the IT department, Kevin is researching Salwa when red text flashes on his screen that says 'WARNING! ENCRYPTION LOCATED', which troubles him.
4	4	"Impossible Mission"	Darren Ashton	Guy Edmonds & Matt Zeremes	1 April 2019
Before school, Jerry is training and giving Mikey a pep talk for the sasi-west-hat competition. Aunty drives Mikey and Jerry to school, where they learn how to grow carrots. The long process of growing a carrot is compared to only the week Mikey has to improve at handball. Jerry reassures Mikey but Tiffany discourages him from entering the competition. At break, Jerry trains Mikey in handball. They also visit Jack in IT for any progress on Salwa's innocence, to which Jack tells them it is impossible to crack her password. An announcement over the loudspeakers announces that the office has Tiffany's phone, after she tried to throw it away to destroy evidence. In class, Tiffany leaves to go to the lost property room to get her phone before Salwa. There are three lost property rooms, so there is a high chance that she won't pick the right room in time. Neither Salwa or Tiffany pick the right room, so they fight about it after school which leads to the phone breaking. After school, Mikey talks to his dad about morality while he bathes.
5	5	"Too Many Cooks"	Darren Ashton	Guy Edmonds & Matt Zeremes	1 April 2019
6	6	"Battle of Block Street"	Kacie Anning	Guy Edmonds & Matt Zeremes	1 April 2019
7	7	"Rush Hour"	Fadia Abboud	Guy Edmonds & Matt Zeremes	1 April 2019
8	8	"The Girl with the Handball Hoody"	Kacie Anning	Guy Edmonds & Matt Zeremes	1 April 2019
9	9	"The Odd Couple"	Darren Ashton	Guy Edmonds & Matt Zeremes	1 April 2019
10	10	"Garry Garrison"	Kacie Anning	Guy Edmonds & Matt Zeremes	1 April 2019
11	11	"A Few Good Bros"	Darren Ashton	Guy Edmonds & Matt Zeremes	1 April 2019
Following the events of the last episode, Mikey is out to clear his name. His attempt to persuade Tiffany to affirm what she saw goes soar when she denies having witnessed him throwing the ball. Mikey's father tries to help by giving Ms. Crapper a team cap, and although she is thankful for it, she remains determined to have Mikey expelled from playing in Sasi-West-Hat. Mikey, Jerry and Salwa attempts to talk to the Butterfield principal by impersonating Ms. Crapper, but to no avail. Salwa later discovers that clause 12 in the handball rules states that a student can't be expelled without a trail where the students vote for or against expulsion. Ms. Crapper approves of a trail, which she herself presides over, Jerry and Salwa act as Mikey's defence and Mustafa and Bao as the prosecutors. Tiffany, Salwa and Mikey are called to the stand, and their fellow students vote for Mikey's innocence. Afterwards, Tiffany reveals to Jerry that she knows that the legend of Howie was a lie, and that if he doesn't tell Mikey himself, she will do it. Jerry arrives at Mikey's, and confesses that he lied about the Howie legend because Mikey needed something to believe and to motivate him with handball. After it dawns on him, Mikey asks Jerry to leave, leaving him upset.
12	12	"Volbrom"	Darren Ashton	Guy Edmonds & Matt Zeremes	1 April 2019
Mikey feels betrayed by Jerry and Salwa, and tries to avoid them. Unbeknown to him, Jerry and his brother Kevin has placed a tracker on his bicycle and follows him to Mustafa's barbershop where Salwa later confronts him. Mikey still blames her and Jerry for the lie about Howie before leaving. He goes to Steele & Stone to tell that he's quitting Sasi-Wests-Hat, and even rebuffs Tiffany's attempt to make him reconsider. After his bike breaks down, he meets his father on the way home. He tells Mikey that everyone deserves a second chance, and after some thought, Mikey rushes to find Jerry and Salwa. He later finds them at the Emu Valley Sports Arena after getting help from Kevin. The friends reconcile and start practising for the upcoming Sasi-Wests-Hat.
13	13	"Sasi-Wests-Hat"	Darren Ashton	Guy Edmonds & Matt Zeremes	1 April 2019
On the day of the Sasi-Wests-Hat, Mikey arrives with his auntie, but his father must attend practise before the match. Mikey's team is up and he is reassured by his friends Jerry and Salwa that he will win and that he has to remember his "why". In the first rounds, Mikey wins and loses but manages to go on without issues. While Tiffany wins over Beatrice, Mikey wins against Z-Pop despite that she hurt her leg. During a break, Ms. Crapper tells him that she had wanted to be good at handball, but could never handle the pressure. Mikey's father arrives in time for the grand finale, where Mikey triumphantly beats Tiffany. Despite his victory, he allows her to make her speech before him. Mikey, his father and aunt and his friends celebrate his victory back at her workshop. Tiffany arrives and challenges Mikey for a re-match at a park tournament. After she leaves, Jerry and Salwa nod affirming to him.

=== Season 2 ===
The second season of Hardball screened from 25 June 2021. It became available for viewing on Netflix in July 2024.
