= Ben Elton Live from Planet Earth =

- Genre: Comedy
- Written by: Ben Elton
- Presented by: Ben Elton
- Country of origin: Australia
- Original language: English
- No. of series: 1
- No. of episodes: 3

Production
- Running time: 60 mins
- Production company: FremantleMedia

Original release
- Network: Nine Network
- Release: 8 February – 22 February 2011

Ben Elton Live From Planet Earth is an Australian comedy television series produced by FremantleMedia which aired on the Nine Network in 2011. The program was broadcast live as a sketch comedy and variety show. Comedian Ben Elton presented the program and performed some stand-up material, with the sketches performed by an ensemble cast including Paul McCarthy and Genevieve Morris. After critical reviews, hostile social media reaction and poor ratings, the Nine Network cancelled the show after three episodes had aired.

== Format and regular segments ==
Ben Elton hosted the show and performed a comedic monologue weekly. Several guest comedians and musicians also performed in between sketches by the ensemble cast of nine performers, which included several from the West Australian Academy of Performing Arts (WAAPA), alongside comedy veterans McCarthy and Morris. Genevieve Morris played celebrity interviewer Elaine Front in one of the show's regular segments, in which Front remained steadfastly unimpressed by the celebrity status of her interview subjects.

Another regular segment was Girl Flat, a "live sitcom" featuring parody versions of Lady Gaga, Beyoncé Knowles, Lily Allen and Amy Winehouse living together in a share house.

== Reception ==
Live From Planet Earth debuted on Channel Nine on 8 February 2011, in the 9:30 pm timeslot. During the broadcast of the first episode, reaction on Twitter was hostile, with many users speculating the show would be axed.

Ratings for the first episode dropped significantly as it aired, with around 805,000 watching the program when it began following Top Gear. After 15 minutes, viewers had dropped to 633,000, then by 33 per cent to 421,000, with 296,000 viewers watching the final 15 minutes—an average of 455,000 viewers over the whole hour. The ratings for the second episode dropped further, averaging 384,000 viewers according to preliminary metro ratings from OzTAM, falling from 469,000 to 250,000.

Reviews of the first episode were largely negative. Colin Vickery of the Herald Sun called it "an early contender for worst show of the year", and Amanda Meade of The Australian called it "a screaming, embarrassing failure". The Age's Karl Quinn stated there was "more to like than dislike" about the show.

A third episode went to air in a delayed timeslot of 10:40 pm, but ratings dropped further to 189,000 viewers and on 23 February, Channel Nine announced the show had been cancelled.
