= The Urban Monkey with Murray Foote =

The Urban Monkey with Murray Foote is an Australian television comedy series on the Australian Broadcasting Corporation starring Sam Simmons and Janis McGavin as Lee-Anne.

The program premiered on 14 September 2009 on ABC2 at 8:55 pm and then repeated on ABC1 from 2 October 2009 at 11:10 pm. Episodes are five minutes long.

The series is presented in mockumentary style and draws parallels between human and animal worlds. The character Murray Foote is an animal warrior, conservationist, scientist, recording artist, good bloke, and ladies man. The promotional blurb states that the series was created in 1987, then lost, and then rediscovered recently in a garage in suburban Melbourne.

== See also ==
- Good bloke
- List of Australian television series
- List of programs broadcast by ABC (Australian TV network)
