= The Time Game =

- DVD cover
- Written by: Stephen Measday
- Directed by: Alister Smart
- Starring: Gabriel Andrews; Brian Blain
- Country of origin: Australia
- Original language: English

Production
- Producer: Robert Bruning

Original release
- Release: 1991

The Time Game is a 1991 Australian television film for children, directed by Alister Smart and starring Gabriel Andrews. The plot concerns a boy sent for a holiday to his grandparents' home, where he discovers a time machine.

== Plot ==
14 year-old Tony, who lives in a prosperous Sydney suburb, is recognised running away from a burning school. He has lied to his parents about his previous whereabouts, so police do not believe his story that he was chasing the arsonists. While waiting for the trial, he is sent to live at his grandparents' house in the country, where he is expected by Grandma Johnson, an ageing hippie, to work at various household chores. Grandpa, a lone inventor, is nowhere to be seen. He has a reputation for vanishing for days but this time it's been months and the bills have not been paid, and Christmas is coming.

Tony is befriended by Brad, about the same age and equally lonely, but not as adventurous. They break into grandpa's workshop and discover a computer-controlled time machine. Trusting Brad to bring him back to the current period, Tony is whisked by the machine to the default setting: Bathurst of the 1850s where, before he can contact his grandfather, he is set upon by Joe and Jack, a pair of gold prospecting scoundrels, and forced to operate their rocking-cradle. He befriends 16-year-old Emily, whose father owned the claim being worked by the scoundrels, but is now their lackey, and they escape together, back to the 20th century.

They get separated and Emily has to deal with the appliances of modern living and is thoroughly bewildered before being reunited with Tony. They return to 19th-century Bathurst, where grandpa is a successful miner, friend of photographer Wylie. They alert the mine wardens, who arrest the claim jumpers, then return to the 20th century. Grandpa uses his time-travelling skills to persuade the arsonists to confess and police drop their charges. Father apologizes to Tony, grandpa reveals his stash of gold, and the family settles down to celebrate Christmas.

== Cast ==
In order of appearance:

- Gabriel Andrews as Tony Johnson
- Sean Scully as Graham Johnson
- Linden Wilkinson as Helen Johnson
- Sean McDonald as Constable Caretti
- John Clayton (Australian actor) as Detective Wills
- Pat Bishop as Gran Johnson
- Daniel Taylor as Brad
- Peter Whitford as Mr Green
- Simon Chilvers as Grandpa George Johnson
- Peter Bensley as Electricity Serviceman
- John Derum as Wylie
- John Jarratt as Joe
- Lawrence Woodward as Jack
- Brian Blain as Mr Crocker
- Sally Warwick as Emily
- Moya O'Sullivan as Mrs Brown
- Rob Steele as Captain Piggott

== Home media ==
A DVD transfer of this film has been released by Flashback Entertainment Cat. no. 20437
