= MTV Hits Weekly Hot30 Countdown =

- Genre: Music television
- Presented by: Erin McNaught; Matty Acton
- Country of origin: Australia
- Original language: English
- No. of seasons: 1 (as of 2010)

Production
- Production location: Sydney
- Running time: 2 hrs, 30 mins

Original release
- Network: MTV Hits Australia
- Release: 5 December 2010 – 2013

MTV Hits Weekly Hot30 Countdown is an Australian music television show that first aired on 5 December 2010. It broadcast on MTV Hits, Today Network radio stations and online each Sunday from 6:00pm–8:30pm.

== Programme format ==
MTV Hits Weekly Hot30 Countdown generally plays a top 30 countdown that consists of the latest national and international video clips. It also features interviews with both local and international artists. It broadcasts every Sunday for two hours and thirty minutes on channel MTV Hits, Today Network radio stations across Australia and also online at MTVhits.com.au and Hot30.com.

== Presenters ==
The presenters of the show include:

- Erin McNaught (2010–current)
- Matty Acton (2010–current)

== See also ==
- List of Australian music television shows
- List of Australian television series
