= Pat Whalen =

Canadian writer

- Born: September 11, 1986; Halifax, Nova Scotia
- Occupation(s): actor, writer

Pat Whalen (born September 11, 1986) is a Canadian writer, director, and choreographer.

Pat has been a part of Spank! The Fifty Shades Parody since its inception. He has worked in Niagara Falls as Rocky in The Rocky Horror Picture Show, Roger in Rent, and is an active member of Boylesque.
