= Comedy Inc. (Australian TV series) =

Australian sketch comedy TV series

- Comedy Inc. The Late Shift Logo
- Starring: Gabriel Andrews; Ben Oxenbould; Mandy McElhinney; Genevieve Morris; Katrina Retallick; Paul McCarthy; Jim Russell; Emily Taheny; Scott Brennan; Simon Mallory; Rebecca De Unamuno; Fiona Harris; Janis McGavin
- Country of origin: Australia
- Original language: English
- No. of seasons: 5
- No. of episodes: 96

Production
- Executive producers: Carl Fennessy; Mark Fennessy
- Production location: TCN-9 Willoughby, New South Wales
- Running time: 43–44 minutes
- Production company: Crackerjack Productions

Original release
- Network: Nine Network
- Release: 19 February 2003 – 26 December 2007

Comedy Inc. is an Australian sketch comedy television series, which ran on the Nine Network from 19 February 2003 to 26 December 2007. The series was produced by Crackerjack Productions. It first premiered in February 2003 in the new wave of Australian sketch comedy shows being launched across the free-to-air channels along with Big Bite and skitHOUSE. Since the end of the series episodes have been repeated on the Foxtel cable channel, The Comedy Channel and during 2009, reruns were shown on Nine HD before the channel's closure.

== Cast ==
- Paul McCarthy — Seasons 1–5 (2003–2007)
- Jim Russell — Seasons 1–5 (2003–2007)
- Emily Taheny — Seasons 1–5 (2003–2007)
- Mandy McElhinney — Seasons 1-4 (2003–2006)
- Genevieve Morris — Seasons 1–4 (2003–2006)
- Katrina Retallick — Seasons 1–4 (2003–2006)
- Gabriel Andrews — Seasons 1–3 (2003–2005)
- Ben Oxenbould — Seasons 1–3 (2003–2005)
- Scott Brennan — Seasons 4–5 (2006–2007)
- Simon Mallory — Seasons 4–5 (2006–2007)
- Rebecca De Unamuno — Season 5 (2007)
- Fiona Harris — Season 5 (2007)
- Janis McGavin — Season 5 (2007)

== Overview ==
When the series debuted, it rapidly gained the highest ratings of the three sketch comedies at that period of Australian television. It subsequently gained numerous nominations for major Australian and international film and television awards. The show has also proved to be more commercially successful in Australia than its rivals and was the first to release a VHS/DVD of content from the series.

The show had many different formats. For example, a more risqué variation of the series was broadcast in 2005, entitled Comedy Inc: The Late Shift. The episodes were aired at a later time, because of the content. The Late Shift aired from 2005 until the end of the series in 2007.

=== Skits and formula ===
Comedy Inc. features original skits, impersonations and irreverent parodies of other television programmes and films. For example, popular Australian and British series such as Big Brother Australia, Dancing with the Stars, Australia's Brainiest Kid, Who Wants to Be a Millionaire? Renovation Rescue, Hi-5, Bob the Builder (as Bodgy Builder) and Thomas & Friends (as Ernest the Engine and Others) are frequently subject to many spoofs, as are Australian news and current affair programmes, such as Today Tonight and 60 Minutes.

In addition, the series features original skits, such as "Selina: She Grows on You", a segment which features an eccentric gardener for a wealthy woman, and her zany and original ways of keeping her garden up to scratch.

A recurring sketch features Emily Taheny as an unnamed woman who approaches other women at inappropriate and private moments such as going to the toilet, showering at a gym or giving birth to a baby. "Matt and Bray" was a skit about family man Al (Russell) and his two odd neighbours (McCarthy and Oxenbould). The skit ended in at the end of season 3, as Ben Oxenbould had left the main cast.

Another recurring sketch features Katrina Retallick as a doctor who approaches her patients stating that "recent medical studies" show that song is the best way to convey possibly upsetting news. She then takes a guitar and starts a cheerful melody about the patient's fatal condition such as cancer, AIDS or a brain tumor, with the rest of the hospital staff and eventually the patient singing along.

"Berni (with an 'i')" (Taheny) was a 10 part skit about 'Berni' and her pathway to fame. Also featured Oxenbould as her flamboyantly gay ex-fiancé. Emily Taheny and Mandy McElhinney played two women on an informercial-like programme, selling odd items or already invented items such as a decorative dynamic compression plate or an ice cube tray. Their respective catchphrases which are said several times throughout the sketch are "sensational" and "absolutely".

A long running skit is "Blokeman" (Russell). The skit always begins with a comic strip story, explaining about an average man (who spoke in a general Australian accent) who made his own beer in his kitchen to have only had it explode, thus becoming "Blokeman". Blokeman is looked upon as a normal hero, despite his obvious "bogan" qualities (ugg boots, mullet, beer belly, broad Australian accent). He is hesitant to help when people ask and usually finds the easiest way to complete the task. He has a girlfriend named "Wondermoll" (McElhinney). In the later series', Blokeman has a nemesis, "Metrosexual Man" (Mallory). When Metrosexual Man appears in a sketch, he is usually followed by the phrase "gay in everyway, except for sexual orientation".

A notable sketch with a father (Russell) who tucks his young son into bed every night, who usually asks him a question, but unbeknownst to himself, is slightly mature. An example is when the son asks his father "What happened to his cousin". Instead of telling a white lie, the father explains to his son that his cousin is gay and was thrown out by his homophobic father.

The sketch will always end with the following lines:

- Son: "Honest dad?"
- Father: "Would I lie to you, mate?"

=== Timeslots ===
When Comedy Inc. began in early 2003, it held the 8:30 pm Wednesday timeslot for two years before moving to 9:30 pm on various nights in 2005, when it was moved around in attempts to improve ratings and changed its name to Comedy Inc.: The Late Shift.

=== Comedy Inc: Specials (2005) ===
In 2005 two one-hour specials called "Comedy Inc: Takes out TV" were aired, the first during the series and then the week following the final episode before "The Late Shift". They featured mostly television parody sketches with a few general sketches.

=== Comedy Inc: The Late Shift (2005–2007) ===
Beginning with its 2005 season, the show aired in a later timeslot, in the process changing its name to Comedy Inc.: The Late Shift. This version was a success with both audiences and television critics, due to its slightly more risque content, as well as original new characters like "Blokeman" and "Matt and Bray". The new show marked the beginning of a collaboration between new head writer Rick Kalowski and producer/director David McDonald. (After working together on 45 episodes of the show from 2004, the pair left the show at the end of the fourth series in late 2006).

The fourth series of Comedy Inc. debuted on Tuesday 30 May 2006 again on the Nine Network. The new series marked the departure of Ben Oxenbould and Gabriel Andrews from the show, and their replacement with the popular Australian comedian Scott Brennan and actor Simon Mallory. In a new 10.30 pm timeslot on Sundays, it again dominated its timeslot, proving especially popular with younger viewers. The fourth series, characterised by darker and even more risque material than the first series of Comedy Inc.: The Late Shift (words such as fuck, for example, are no longer censored), ran 25 one-hour episodes in total, following an extension of the series by the Nine Network, making it the longest running series of the show to date.

On Thursday 19 October 2006, the show was nominated at the 2006 "Australian Film Institute Awards" in five categories, including Best Television Comedy Series, Best Direction in Television, and two nominations for Best Performance in a Television Comedy Series, one each for Paul McCarthy and Genevieve Morris.

The fifth season was directed by Damian Davis, previously director of The Ronnie Johns Half Hour. The head writers were Kevin Brumpton and Angus Fitzsimons.

The fifth season began production in January 2007 and would end in July 2007. On 5 September 200, most of the female cast left—including Mandy McElhinney, Katrina Retallick and Genevieve Morris—and they were replaced by SkitHOUSE actress Fiona Harris, previously recurring actress Rebecca De Unamuno, and newcomer Janis McGavin.

On 26 December 2007, the show aired its final episode, as the cast had felt that the fifth series should be their last.

An international version of the show, comprising a series of 20 half-hour episodes, has aired on cable television in several countries. A second series of the international version of the show aired in late 2007. The international version focusses on sketches, character pieces and parodies of overseas programs, and excludes parodies of Australian programs with which a foreign audience would be unfamiliar.

== Critical and commercial reception ==
Although critical reaction to the series on its debut in 2003 was mixed, reviews of the show have improved with each series. The 2005 and 2006 series of the show, in particular, received largely positive reviews from most major Australian newspapers, some suggesting that the later timeslot had made for a darker, more interesting and funnier show. Consistent with that critical response, it is the 'later timeslot' series of the show that has been nominated for various awards.

Jim Schembri, notoriously tough television critic for the Melbourne newspaper The Age has described the show as "the hands-down funniest and smartest local laughfest on TV in 2006."

Commercially, Comedy Inc has also proved to be successful, although it never attained the ratings of its 2003 season. The success of the later series is often said to have affected the cancellation of its competitors, such as skitHOUSE.

=== Award nominations and wins ===
As noted above, Comedy Inc. has received many and various nominations and awards. In 2005, the "Australian Film Institute" Awards nominated Comedy Inc.: The Late Shift for Best Television Comedy Series, as well as a 2006 Logie Award for Most Outstanding Comedy Series, and 2006 Rose D'Or (Golden Rose of Montreaux) Award for Best International Comedy Series. David McDonald received nominations for Best Direction in Television, and for Best Series (in his capacity as producer) at both the 2005 and 2006 "Australian Film Institute" Awards for his work on the show.

== Guest cast ==
These notable cast members made guest appearances on Comedy Inc:

- Billy Birmingham
- Chas Licciardello
- Andrew Hansen
- Indiana Evans
- James Reyne
- Shawn Cosgrove
- Robert DiPierdomenico
- Deni Hines
- Barry Crocker
- Tim Minchin

== See also ==
- List of Australian television series
- List of Nine Network programs
