= Paul McCarthy (actor) =

Australian comedy actor

- Born: Paul McCarthy; 13 January 1967 (age 59); Melbourne, Australia
- Occupations: television actor, comedian
- Years active: 1986–present

Paul McCarthy (born 13 January 1967 in Melbourne, Australia) is an Australian comedy actor. He is best known for sketch comedy television series Comedy Inc.

== Career ==
He began performing professionally while attending Melbourne University, touring Australia with revue show Laminex on the Rocks which also starred Mick Molloy, Jason Stephens, Erika Williams and Andrew Maj.

McCarthy appeared on stand-up comedy stages in Melbourne during the late eighties and through the nineties and was a regular participant in the annual Melbourne International Comedy Festival before finding his way onto television.

He also starred in Totally Full Frontal, a late 1990s television sketch comedy show, as well as in the hit Mick Molloy comedy Crackerjack. He has received two Green Room Awards for his contributions to live cabaret and his (co-devised) work Cliff Hanger in Catch A Falling Star was awarded Best Cabaret Show at Melbourne Fringe 2002.

He is best known for starring in the highly successful sketch comedy television series Comedy Inc. (or Comedy Inc – The Late Shift as it was known as between 2005 and 2007). He was, along with Comedy Inc. co-star Genevieve Morris a 2006 Australian Film Institute Awards nominee for Best Performance in a Television Comedy. The show itself has received seven AFI nominations in all, together with one Logie Award nomination in 2006 for Outstanding Television Comedy Series, and one 2006 Rose D'Or Award for Best International Comedy Series. At the Logie Awards of 2007 he performed the opening section as David Koch, a role he frequently portrayed in Comedy Inc.

In 2009, he starred in Double Take. He notably played as Kevin Rudd and David Koch, as well as Bert Newton, Jerry Springer and Rove McManus.

In 2011, he acted in the short-lived live comedy television program Live From Planet Earth, before rebounding with a starring role as former Prime Minister Kevin Rudd in the ABC1 narrative comedy series At Home with Julia.
