= Danielle Trzcinski =

American actor and comedian

- Born: Tampa, Florida

Danielle Trzcinski is an American actor and comedian. She starred in the national US tour of in Spank! The Fifty Shades Parody as Natasha Woode.

Danielle studied at Florida State University before attending the American Musical and Dramatic Academy in NYC for Musical Theatre. She also studied improv at the Upright Citizen's Brigade in New York. In 2011 she premièred Non-Equity the Musical!, which she starred in, as well as wrote the book and lyrics for. Danielle was one of the “Top 25” on NBC’s Last Comic Standing, as well as one of the “Top 5” females in NBC’s Stand Up for Diversity.
