= Erin McNaught =

Australian model, actress, presenter and television personality (born 1982)

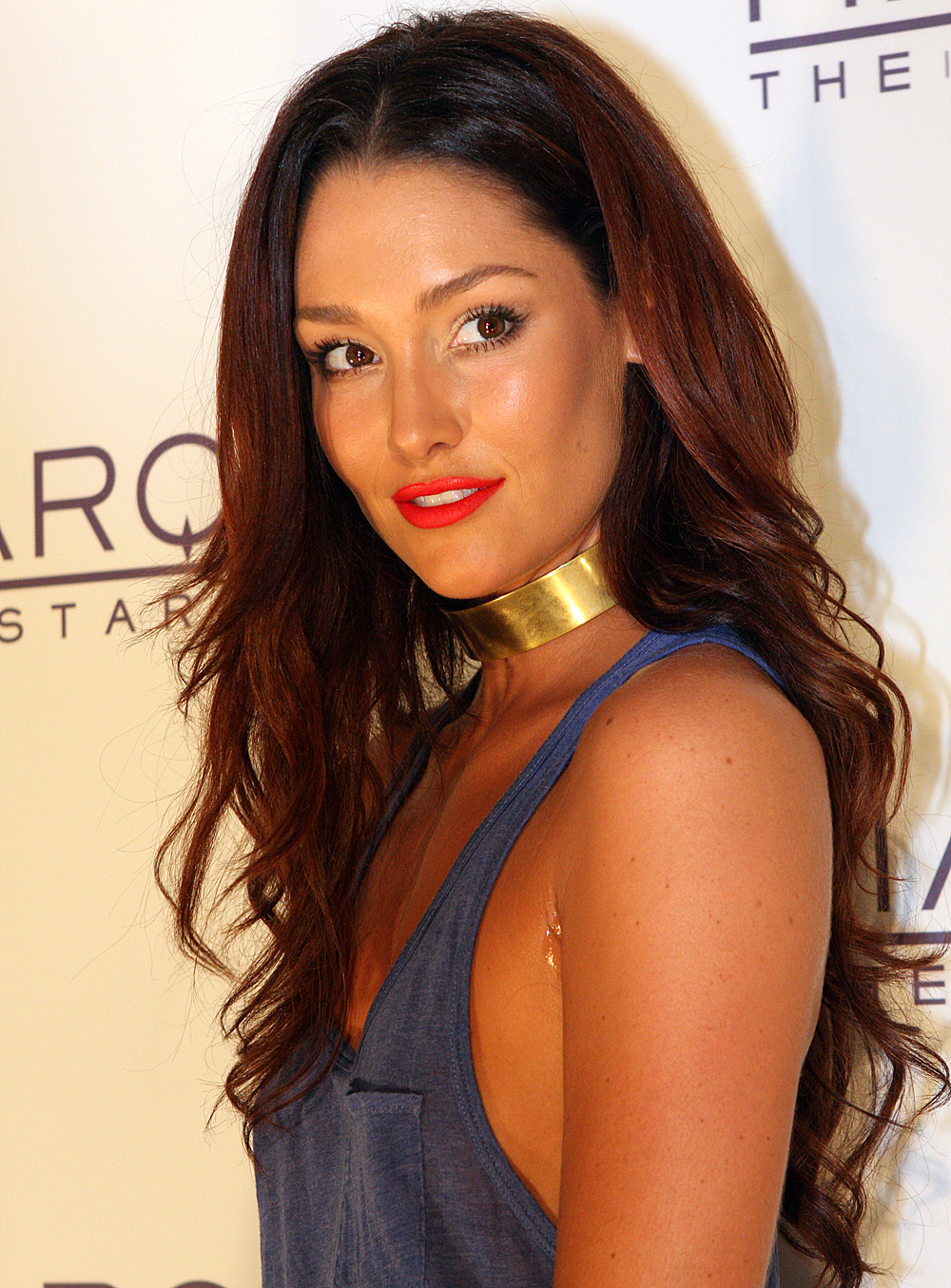
- McNaught at the Paris Hilton: Marquee The Star Sydney in March 2012
- Born: 22 May 1982 (age 44); Canberra, Australian Capital Territory, Australia
- Occupations: Model, actress, presenter
- Known for: Miss Universe Australia 2006
- Spouse: Example (m. 2013; sep. 2022)
- Partner: Stace Cadet (engaged)
- Children: 3
- Modeling information
- Hair color: Brown
- Eye color: Brown

Erin McNaught (born 22 May 1982) is an Australian model, actress, presenter, television personality and beauty pageant titleholder. McNaught grew up in Australia alongside her older brothers and began playing in a band named "Short Straw" in her teenage years. After starting a career in modelling she represented Australia at the Miss Universe 2006 competition. After her participation McNaught went on to secure more modelling contracts and television jobs. In 2007 she took acting classes and secured a part in the soap opera Neighbours playing the role of Sienna Cammeniti. In 2010, she was employed by MTV and fronted their MTV Hits Weekly Hot30 Countdown show.

== Early life ==
McNaught was born in Canberra, capital city of Australia. She is the daughter of Andy McNaught and Lindy McNaught. Her parents made a point of promoting healthy living to McNaught and from them she also developed a passion for cooking. She grew up alongside her older brothers. McNaught and her family spent time living in Seattle during the 1990s. She later joined a band named "Short Straw" in which she played bass guitar and backing vocals. The collective secured gigs around Brisbane. She also had thirteen piercings and black hair. McNaught later branded the period in her life as a "phase".

== Career ==
McNaught was titled Miss Australia in 2006; but topless photographs of her surfaced and judge Jonathan Westbrook and event co-ordinator Deborah Miller called for McNaught to have the title taken from her. It was later decided that she should keep the title. She was chosen from nineteen finalists to represent Australia in the Miss Universe 2006 competition. She had clothes made by Australian designers Wayne Cooper, Jayson Brunsdon and Eliza Joy. However, McNaught caused more controversy after she did not take enough outfits to the event. She put together a video diary of her journey for Nine Network's topical show A Current Affair. McNaught did not progress well in the competition and failed to make the final twenty. McNaught later took part in the Wintergarden Spring Summer Gala located in Brisbane. She also began negotiating modelling and television contracts.

In December 2006, it was announced that McNaught had secured a presenting role on Cybershack, a programme analysing consumer technology. She began working on the series in February 2007; McNaught felt that she was equipped to deal with "gadgets" because she had grown up with older brothers "doing typical boys stuff". By this time McNaught was being booked for many promotional events.

McNaught later began taking acting lessons at the Actors Centre in Surry Hills and was coached by Simon Hunt. In August 2007, she travelled to Melbourne to audition and carry out a screen test for casting directors of the soap opera Neighbours. In November 2007, it was announced that she had secured a role playing the character Sienna Cammeniti. Her introduction was part of a strategy to boost the show's ratings in Australia. She said she was "nervous" about joining the show because it was "a big change" to the work she was used to doing. She began filming her first scenes on 17 December. By March 2008, McNaught had impressed Neighbours' producers and her contract was extended by three months. In July 2008, it was announced that she had decided to leave the series for the benefit of her relationship with Braith Anasta. McNaught said it had been a "tough decision to make" because she had a "great experience"; adding that she was happy with her acting achievements. Hannah Davies from The Courier-Mail reported that the acting industry were "outraged" by McNaught's employment and accused Neighbours of hiring famous people for ratings.

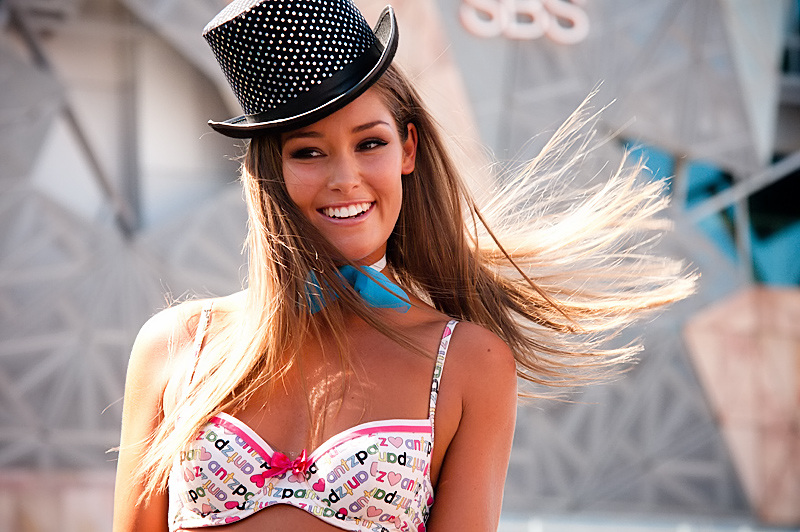
McNaught modelling underwear at Federation Square, Melbourne.

McNaught later became an ambassador to REPLAY Faces 2008, an online talent search to discover new models. She launched the talent search and chose the winner. She also became an ambassador for the charity campaign Fashion Targets Breast Cancer. McNaught has also hosted two seasons of the Asia Pacific Poker Tour. On 24 November 2009, McNaught severed the index finger on her right hand in an accident as she was shooting a story for Cybershack: she fell from a dirt bike she was riding, and got her hand trapped in the bike's spinning wheel. The severed finger was reattached in emergency surgery. In December 2010, she began co-hosted the MTV Hits Weekly Hot30 Countdown with Matty Acton. McNaught told Kate Waterhouse from The Sun-Herald that felt more comfortable working for MTV because she could show the public her personality. She stated that her involvement in Miss Universe had "pigeonholed [her] as a pageant type" which made her feel as though she needed to act a like a "goody two-shoes". She also revealed that she had aspirations to work in music journalism. 2010 also saw McNaught front an advertisement campaign for Pepsi and act as a guest judge on Australia's Next Top Model.

As of 2011, McNaught was modelling for brands including Antz Pantz and Mambo. She told Donna Duggan from News.com.au that she was "fortunate" because the contractors did pressure her into losing weight. Although she was now content with her body image, she revealed that she lacked confidence upon starting modelling. Under pressure to be thin, McNaught stated that her eating habits were "all over the place". In 2012, McNaught took part in season twelve of Dancing with the Stars and was partnered with Gleb Savchenko. She was the first celebrity to be eliminated from the competition. In celebration of her thirtieth birthday she appeared naked on the cover of the June 2012 issue of Maxim Australia.

In May 2020, McNaught's then husband and musician Example released a song titled "Erin". The song features McNaught's vocals and she appeared alongside her then husband in the music video. In October 2020, it was announced McNaught would be participating the Seven Network's reality program SAS Australia.

== Personal life ==
In early 2007, McNaught began a relationship with professional rugby league player Braith Anasta. While filming on Neighbours, McNaught did not have much time to spend with Anasta; which prompted her to leave. Following her split from Anasta she then had a two-year relationship with Nathan Jolliffe. In November 2012, McNaught and musician Example announced that they were engaged. They had met in 2011 when she interviewed him as part of her job on MTV. On 18 May 2013, they married in Australia. On 23 July 2014, McNaught announced she and Example were expecting their first child. She gave birth to their first child, Evander Maxwell Gleave, on 21 December 2014, in Australia. In December 2016, McNaught revealed that she had suffered a miscarriage the previous month. She gave birth to their second child, Ennio Stanley Gleave, in 2017. In October 2022, Example and McNaught announced they were separating after 11 years together, describing it "as amicable as it gets".

McNaught is currently in a relationship with Australian record producer Stace Cadet. In October 2024, she gave birth to her third and first child with Cadet, Obi Brooks Kotaras. In May 2026, McNaught announced she and Cadet are engaged.

Awards and achievements
Preceded by (Western Australia) Michelle Guy	Miss Universe Australia; 2006	Succeeded by (Queensland) Kimberley Busteed
