= Faustina Agolley =

Australian television presenter (born 1984)

- Born: Faustina Agolley; 10 April 1984 (age 42); London, UK
- Other name: Fuzzy
- Occupations: Presenter, journalist, producer
- Years active: 2001–present
- Known for: Video Hits; Sydney New Year's Eve (2007–08, 2008–09)

Faustina "Fuzzy" Agolley (born 10 April 1984) is an Australian television presenter best known for her role as the host of long-running Australian music program Video Hits on Channel 10. She was also the host of late-night game and gadget review program Cybershack and is a graduate from the University of Melbourne and RMIT University. She previously co-hosted The Voice alongside Darren McMullen.

== Personal life ==
Faustina was born on 10 April 1984 in Islington, North London to Ghanaian father, Samuel and Chinese Hakka mother, Philomena – both nurses. They lived in a bedsit in Crouch End, in the borough of Harringey, North London. Faustina was seven weeks old when she lost her father to a car accident. Faustina and her family moved to Melbourne, Australia when Faustina was 18 months old.

In April 2015, Faustina came out as a lesbian.

== Education ==
Faustina was educated at Sacred Heart Girls' College where she completed her Victorian Certificate of Education and held the role of school captain in 2001. Faustina completed two degrees across three universities – a joint degree in media & communication and geography at the University of Melbourne and the University of Sydney, as well as media studies with a major in television and social science at RMIT University.

== Career ==
While completing her University degrees, Faustina also worked as a model in Melbourne and Sydney. Faustina was the face of Bonds and appeared in the campaign alongside Miranda Kerr. She also worked as a researcher for The Great Outdoors and worked on set of kids' program Hi-5

=== Channel [V] ===
In 2003, Faustina auditioned for a co-host the Masked Avenger alongside Jabba on Channel [V]. Faustina did not get the part but was asked to co-host the Big Day Out coverage which led to her first mainstream presenting role on Cybershack.

=== Network Ten ===
==== Cybershack ====
In 2006, Faustina became the host of Cybershack on Network Ten, a late-night program dedicated to video game and technology reviews. It was at this time that Faustina was offered to take on the role as host of Video Hits First. In 2007 Faustina decided to leave Cybershack to commit more time to hosting Video Hits.

==== Video Hits ====
Faustina was the host of Australia's music video program Video Hits for five years where she interviewed artists including the Black Eyed Peas, Alicia Keys, Kanye West, Adele, Jack White, Muse, Green Day, Rihanna, Dave Grohl, John Paul Jones, Sinéad O'Connor and Neil Finn.

Faustina also hosted live events for Video Hits from Australia's major capital cities and the Make Poverty History Concert where U2 and Pearl Jam made a surprise performance.

Faustina traveled the world for Video Hits giving the first Australian TV interview with Adele and Florence and The Machine in London in 2009, The Black Eyed Peas upon the release of their LP, The End in Paris in as well as Muse upon the release of The Resistance, in Lake Como. Faustina also covered interviews in Los Angeles, San Francisco, New York, Tokyo and Stockholm.

==== Other television roles ====
Faustina also hosted Network Ten's live national coverage of the New Year's Eve Fireworks from Sydney's Harbour Bridge in 2007–08 and 2008–09, and was a guest on Good News Week and Talkin' 'Bout Your Generation. She also co-hosted The Voice Australia in 2012.

=== ABC TV ===
Faustina has also appeared on ABC TV's live political show Q+A, and on Spicks and Specks and Harrow.

=== Nine Network ===
==== The Voice Australia ====
On 10 May 2012, Agolley was announced as the social media correspondent for The Voice Australia during the shows live shows stage of the competition.

== Philanthropy ==
Faustina is the ambassador for the Australian Literacy and Numeracy Foundation, a foundation that aims to help close the indigenous literacy gap. Faustina is also patron of the Juvenile Diabetes Research Foundation, has been the supporter of Girls' Night In, World Environment Day, Coastcare, Together.com and Reconciliation Australia.
