= Rick Kalowski =

Rick Kalowski (born 9 May 1972) is an Australian television and film writer/producer, best known for his work on the high-rating but controversial ABC1 sitcom At Home with Julia. Before becoming a writer, Kalowski spent several years working as a lawyer, including clerking for Justice Mary Gaudron at the High Court of Australia.

Kalowski's first screenplay (written with Andrew Jones) was the political satire The Honourable Wally Norman (2003), directed by Ted Emery (Kath & Kim), produced by Emile Sherman (The King's Speech), and starring Shaun Micallef, Kevin Harrington and H.G. Nelson. The film was opening night selection at the 50th Sydney Film Festival in 2003 and earned Kevin Harrington an Australian Film Institute Awards nomination for Best Actor.

Kalowski's other television credits include head writer and co-creator of the sketch comedy television series Big Bite, a 2003 nominee for Best Comedy Series at the Australian Film Institute Awards starring Chris Lilley and Andrew O'Keefe; and head writer of the Nine Network late-night sketch comedy series Comedy Inc - The Late Shift between 2004 and 2006, nominated for 7 Australian Film Institute Awards including two for Best Comedy Series, the 2006 Logie Award for Most Outstanding Comedy Program, and the 2006 Rose D'Or (Golden Rose of Montreaux) Award for Best International Comedy Series. Kalowski was also co-creator (with David McDonald), head writer, producer of the sketch comedy television series Double Take (2009), noted for its Julia Gillard "Nine to Nine" song parody video that predicted Gillard replacing Prime Minister Kevin Rudd, and which became a highly popular viral internet item when that political event later occurred in August 2010

Kalowski has also developed projects in the United States and the United Kingdom. He won the 2006 AWGIE (Australian Writers' Guild Award) for Best Documentary Script.

In late 2010, Kalowski was appointed Creative Director - Scripted & Light Entertainment at Quail Television, a Sydney-based production company. His first commission in that role was co-creator/co-writer/executive producer of the sitcom At Home with Julia, starring fellow co-creators/co-writers Amanda Bishop and Phil Lloyd, which began airing on ABC1 on 7 September 2011.
