= Sexy Herpes =

2017 Australian comedy web series

- Created by: Madeleine Dyer & Daniel Mulvihill
- Directed by: Madeleine Dyer
- Country of origin: Australia
- No. of episodes: 6

Production
- Producer: Daniel Mulvihill
- Running time: 6 episodes, 5-11 min. in length, 55min total

Original release
- Network: YouTube; 9Go!
- Release: 27 September 2017

Sexy Herpes is an Australian comedy web series written by Madeleine Dyer and Dan Mulvihill. It was produced by Mad Dan Productions and Beyondedge in 2017. Sexy Herpes is a workplace comedy, set in a sexual health clinic, where the staff are as dysfunctional as their patients.

The series was released on YouTube in September 2017 and made its Australian TV debut on free to air television channel 9Go! in April 2018. It also streams through 9Now.

== Cast ==
- Zoe McDonald as Sarah
- Genevieve Morris as Barb
- Katie Castles as Mullen
- Jay K. Cagatay as Karen
- Chloe Ng as Jackie
- Mark Silveria as Greg
- Rohan Nichol as Dr Phillip Roth
- Veronica Thomas as Clare
- Harriet Dyer as Becky
- Paul Denny as Dean
- Jason Geary as Warren
- Nicholas Capper as Joey
- Neil Foley as Neil
- Jack Doherty as Jack
- Dave Todman as Liam
- Lisa Hanley as Fiona
- Natalie Corrigan as Gabby
- Diana Dyer as Jeanette
- David Shire as Luke
- John Dyer as Mal
- Mark Dyer as Marty

== Episodes ==
- Episode 1: "The Horse, The Nurse & The Labia"
  - Sarah and team try to navigate through a few odd patient experiences, whilst seeking refuge at the local pub.
- Episode 2: "The Break Up"
  - Sarah lets her troubled romantic life affect her treatment of a patient.
- Episode 3: "Pizza & Sadness"
  - Post break up, Karen & Jackie, try to boost Sarah's spirits by getting her back on the dating scene.
- Episode 4: "Dead Mother"
  - Karen tries to guilt Sarah to go on a date with her friend.
- Episode 5: "Who Wants To Netflix & Chill?"
  - Sarah unexpectedly finds a romantic spark between her and trainee nurse, Clare, at the clinic.
- Episode 6: "How To Be Happy"
  - Sarah and the team confront their collective demons in their personal lives to pursue a happy existence. However, things don't go to plan.
