= Harriet Dyer =

Australian actress (b. 1988)

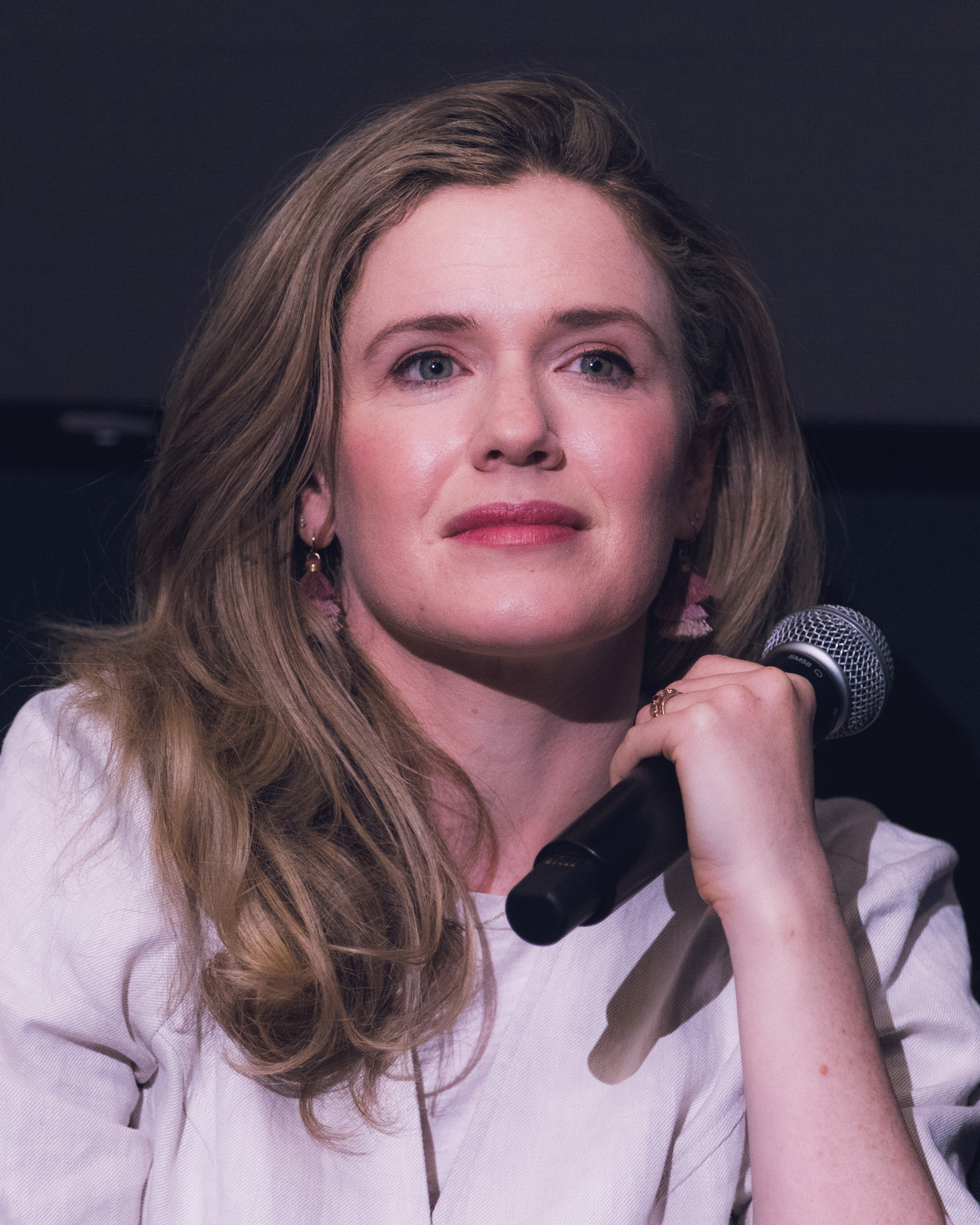
- Dyer in 2025
- Born: 17 October 1988 (age 38); Townsville, Queensland, Australia
- Education: National Institute of Dramatic Art (BFA)
- Occupation: Actress • Writer
- Years active: 2012–present
- Spouse: Patrick Brammall (m. 2021)
- Children: 2

Harriet Dyer (born 17 October 1988) is an Australian actress and writer. She is best known for starring in the television series Love Child (2014–2017) and No Activity (2015–2018). She has also appeared in films, most notably The Invisible Man (2020). Alongside her husband Patrick Brammall, she is the co-creator, co-writer, and co-star of the comedy series Colin from Accounts (2022–2026). In the United States, she has been in the main cast of The InBetween (2019), American Auto (2021–2023), and DMV (2025–2026).

== Early life and education ==
Harriet Dyer is from Townsville, Queensland. She was educated at Townsville Grammar School before moving to Sydney, New South Wales, in 2007, soon after turning 18.

She auditioned for the acting course at the National Institute of Dramatic Art twice but was not accepted, but instead did a one-year music theatre course there. In 2009, she enrolled for a full-time acting course at Actors Centre Australia, graduating in 2011.

== Career ==
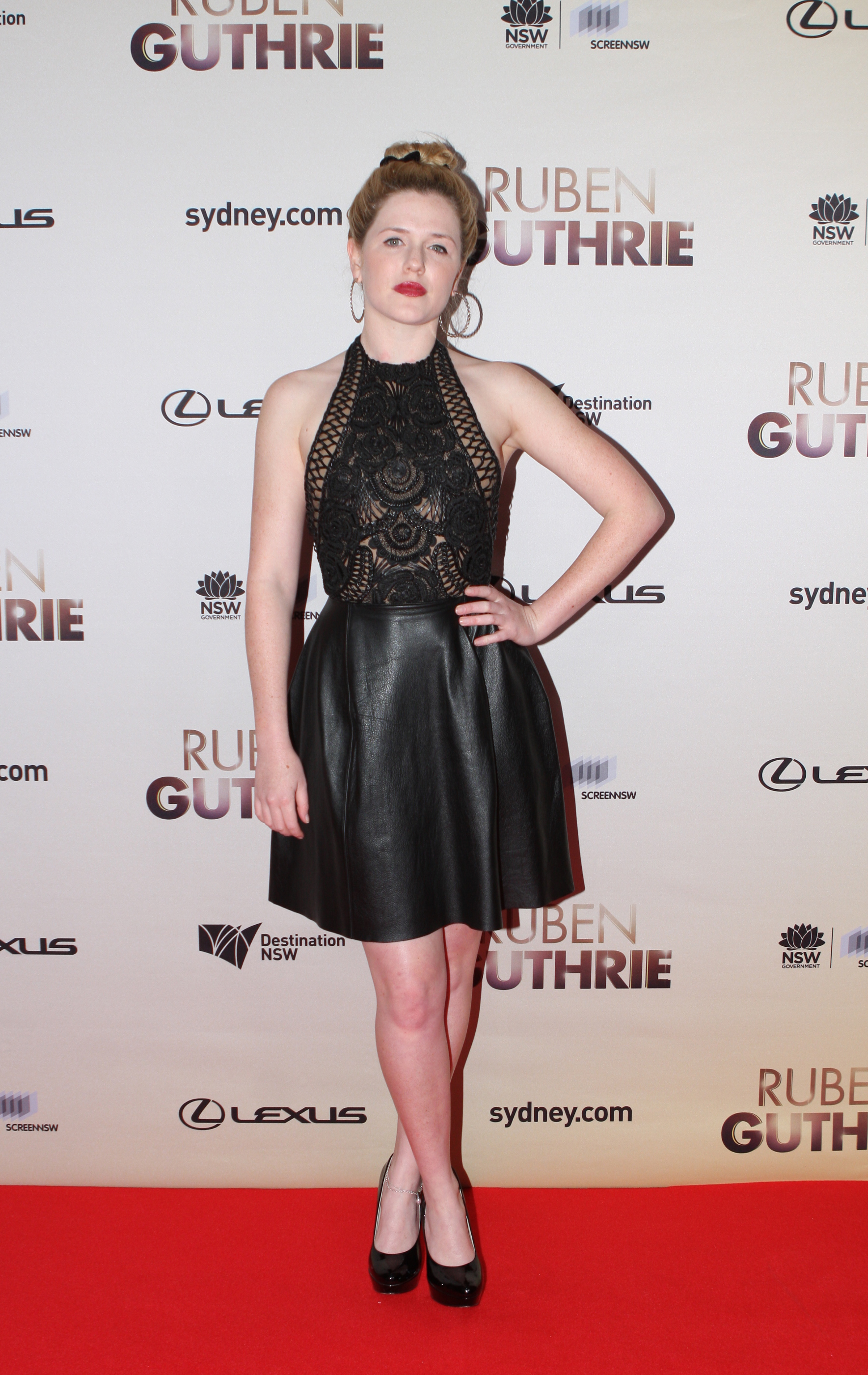
Dyer in 2015

A couple of months after graduating in 2011, Dyer played a small role in a Sydney Theatre Company (led by Cate Blanchett) production of Pygmalion, which was a big break for her.

She appeared in the television comedy mockumentary series Micro Nation in 2012. This was followed by guest roles on A Moody Christmas in 2012 and Packed to the Rafters in 2013.

In 2014, Dyer appeared in the first season of drama series Janet King as Maya Blakely. In the same year, she starred in the drama series Love Child as Patricia Saunders. She was a regular for three seasons and appeared as a guest in the first episode of the fourth season.

From 2015, Dyer also appeared in the comedy television series No Activity as April. In 2016, she also had a guest role in the drama series Hyde & Seek.

In 2017, Dyer appeared in Kiki and Kitty an Australian comedy series on ABC iview and ABC Comedy. She also starred in the NBC drama series The InBetween playing Cassie Bedford, a woman who can see and communicate with the dead.

In 2022, Dyer, along with her husband actor Patrick Brammall, developed, wrote, and starred in the comedy series Colin from Accounts.

== Personal life ==
In August 2017, Dyer was reported to be dating No Activity co-star Patrick Brammall. In March 2021, Dyer and Brammall married after being engaged for five days. The couple adopted their first child, a newborn daughter, in September 2021. The couple adopted their second daughter in February 2025.

== Filmography ==
=== Film ===
| Year | Title | Role | Notes |
|---|---|---|---|
| 2012 | Meat the Parents | Sarah | Short film |
| 2012 | Pacific Cove | Amber | Short film |
| 2013 | The Fragments | Harriet | Short film |
| 2015 | Ruben Guthrie | Virginia | |
| 2016 | Down Under | Stacey | |
| 2016 | Killing Ground | Samantha "Sam" Shaw | |
| 2018 | The Mother Situation | Katie | Short film |
| 2019 | The Way We Weren't | Miss Darling | |
| 2020 | The Invisible Man | Emily Kass | |

=== Television ===
| Year | Title | Role | Notes |
|---|---|---|---|
| 2012 | Micro Nation | Emma Cosdosca | Episode: "Meet Pullamawang" |
| 2012 | A Moody Christmas | Airport Girl | Miniseries; episode: "Last Minute Airfare" |
| 2013 | Packed to the Rafters | Mandy | Episode: "Taking Stock" |
| 2014 | Janet King | Maya Blakely | Main cast (season 1) |
| 2014–2017 | Love Child | Patricia "Patty" Saunders | Main cast (seasons 1–4) |
| 2015–2016, 2018 | No Activity | April | Main cast (seasons 1–2 and Christmas Special 2018) |
| 2016 | Black Comedy | Guest cast | Episodes 2.3, 2.4 |
| 2016 | Rake | Star Mannix | Episode 4.5 |
| 2016 | Hyde & Seek | Dakota Matherson | Miniseries; episode 7 |
| 2017 | Sexy Herpes | Becky | Episode: "How to Be Happy" |
| 2017 | The Letdown | Busy | Episode: "Trivial Pursuits" |
| 2017 | Kiki and Kitty | Cherise | Recurring role; 4 episodes |
| 2017–2019 | The Other Guy | Stevie Nicholls | Main cast (seasons 1–2) |
| 2018, 2021 | No Activity | Hazel | U.S. adaptation. Episodes: "The Actress", "Tea for Two! Two for Tea" |
| 2019 | The InBetween | Cassie Bishop | Main cast; 10 episodes |
| 2021 | Wakefield | Genevieve | Recurring role, limited-run series; 4 episodes |
| 2021–2023 | American Auto | Sadie Ryan | Main cast (seasons 1–2) |
| 2022 | Summer Love | Steph | Episode: "Jules & Tom and Jonah & Steph"; also co-writer |
| 2022–2026 | Colin from Accounts | Ashley | Main cast (seasons 1–3); also co-creator, co-writer & exec. producer |
| 2025–2026 | DMV | Colette | Main cast; 20 episodes |

== Awards and nominations ==
| Year | Award | Category | Nominated work | Result |
|---|---|---|---|---|
| 2015 | AACTA Awards | Best Guest or Supporting Actress in a Television Drama | Love Child | Nominated |
| 2015 | Logie Awards | Most Popular New Talent | Love Child | Nominated |
| 2015 | Logie Awards | Graham Kennedy Award for Most Outstanding Newcomer | Love Child | Nominated |
| 2016 | Logie Awards | Most Outstanding Supporting Actress | Love Child | Nominated |
| 2023 | Logie Awards | Most Outstanding Actress | Colin from Accounts | Won |
| 2025 | Logie Awards | Best Lead Actress in a Comedy | Colin from Accounts | Nominated |
