= Hollie Andrew =

Australian actress

- Born: Adelaide
- Occupation: Actress
- Years active: 2003-present
- Known for: Fat Tony and Co

Hollie Andrew is an Australian film, television and stage actress.

== Early life and education ==
Andrew was born and raised in Adelaide.

She graduated from Flinders University (SA) in 1999 with an Honours Degree in Drama. She then attended the Western Australian Academy of Performing Arts (WAAPA), graduating with a Bachelor of Arts in Musical Theatre in 2002.

== Career ==
Andrew's first major role was in the 2004 film Somersault, where she appeared alongside Abbie Cornish and Sam Worthington; she was nominated for the Australian Film Institute Award for Best Actress in a Supporting Role for her role as Bianca. She then appeared in the satirical ABC comedy series Double the Fist and featured in two series of BBC/UKTV comedy series Supernova as Dr Jude Wardlaw. In June 2009 she starred in a production of Metro Street in Korea with Debra Byrne, adding to her catalogue of musical theatre work.

She was a cast member of the short-lived 2009 sketch comedy TV series Double Take.

She appeared in the 2014 Nine Network miniseries Fat Tony & Co.

Other television credits include CNNNN, Life Support, Home and Away, and All Saints.

In 2014 she was in talks to co-direct and costar in a film entitled Ebonny.

=== Stage ===
Stage credits are The Adventure Of Snugglepot and Cuddlepie, directed by Neil Armfield (Company B); Wrong Turn at Lungfish & Ruby Sunrise (Ensemble Theatre), Hair! (Production Company), Jumping The Q and 5th At Randwick (Naked Theatre Company), The Last Five Years (Echelon Productions), and the Music by Moonlight Concert Series conducted by George Ellis at Sydney Olympic Park. Andrew performed alongside Casey Donovan and Christine Anu in the Company B and the Black Swan Theatre production of The Sapphires. In 2014 she toured Australia with a new stage version of Wogboys.

=== Short film ===
Andrew's short film credits include Love and Contempt (Jo Mitchell Productions), Second Draft (Housebound Productions), and Anniversary (Michael Neild).

== Awards and honours ==
- 2002: Winner, Leslie Anderson Theatre Award for The Most Promising Newcomer to Western Australia Performing Arts
- 2005: Nomination, AFI Awards, Best Supporting Actress in the role of Bianca in Somersault
- 2010: Winner, Glugs Award, Best Supporting Actress for her role as Suzie Tyrone in The Ruby Sunrise

== Filmography ==
Year	Title	Role	Notes
2022	Irreverent	Angel	1 episode
2022	Upright (TV series)	Bec	1 episode
2022	More Than This	Samantha	4 episodes
2020	Informer 3838	Roberta Williams	1 episode
2017	House Husbands	Libby	1 episode
2014	Fat Tony & Co.	Roberta Williams	9 episodes
2013	Tallest Poppies	Lorraine Q	2 episodes
2012	The Next Big Thing	Kerry	Short
2012	Underbelly (TV series)	Tracy Shepard	3 episodes
2009	Double Take	Various	11 episodes
2008	Double the Fist	Tara	8 episodes
2005-06	Supernova	Jude Wardlaw	12 episodes
2004	All Saints (TV series)	Maggie West	1 episode
2004	Somersault	Bianca	
2003	Lifesupport		1 episode
2003	Home and Away: Hearts Divided	Mira	

== Personal life ==
Andrew lived from 2011 to 2013 in Los Angeles. She returned to Australia in 2013 after being cast in Fat Tony & Co., and was living on the Gold Coast, Queensland, in 2014.
