= Guy Edmonds =

Australian actor, writer and director

- Occupations: Actor, writer, director
- Years active: 2004–present
- Spouse: HaiHa Le
- Children: 2
- Website: guyedmonds.com

Guy Edmonds is an Australian director, writer, actor and author.

He is the set up director and script producer on Caper Crew, seen globally on Netflix in 190+ territories. He's also the set up director on Emma's Dance Club, starring Emma Watkins. He co created, wrote, directed and starred in the Emmy award-winning series Hardball and Spooky Files. He also co-authored the hit book series Zombie Diaries and Zoo Crew. His new book Milly MacDuff is out in 2027, published by Harper Collins.

Edmonds is also an actor he is best known for his work on such programmes as Home and Away, A Moody Christmas and Underbelly: Razor, and on stage in the world premiere productions of Holding the Man as Timothy Conigrave in Australia and London's West End, and Rupert alongside Academy Award nominee James Cromwell in Australia and Washington D.C, USA.

== Career ==
In November 2024, his next project and feature film debut, Nest, was announced - starring Felix Mallard.

Edmonds co-created, wrote, directed and starred in ABC's Emmy award-winning, and twice Emmy nominated, live action comedy series Hardball. Playing for twenty-three episodes over two seasons, this series earned Guy an Australian Directors' Guild nomination for Best Direction. Hardball also won Best Children's Fiction Program at the Prix Jeunesse International Awards, BANFF Rockies, The Remis, Japan Prize, and more.

Edmonds created and wrote Dance Spies, with Northern Pictures in Australia. He's co-written two critically acclaimed kids book series - Zoo Crew, published by Scholastic, and Zombie Diaries, published by Hardie Grant. Zombie Diaries has, so far, been translated into seven languages. Both seasons of BBC/ABC's Spooky Files, on which he's co-creator, executive producer, writer, director and actor, are out now. He's made several award-winning short films, and was a directing finalist at the prestigious Tropfest Film Festival. He has a number of new film and television projects in development as a writer and director.

In 2024, Edmonds would team up with Northern Pictures to produce Dance Spies.

Guy's acting career spans two decades with over fifty credits on stage and screen. Some screen credits include Wellmania, The Messenger, The Code, Spooky Files, Underbelly: Razor, Hardball, A Moody Christmas, Home and Away, The Secrets She Keeps and more.

Edmonds has appeared on stage and has starred in many world premiere productions, including Holding the Man in Australia and London's West End, and Rupert in Australia and Washington, D.C. in the United States and many more.

Edmonds is also a voice over artist, having lent his voice to award-winning TV and radio campaigns for local and international brands.

== Personal life ==
Guy is married to Australian actress and editor HaiHa Le and they have two children together.

== Filmography ==
=== Television appearances ===
Year	Title	Role	Notes	Ref
2026	Shakedown	Alan Tudge	TV series	
2026-present	Caper Crew	Skip Scoopworthy	5 episodes	
2023	The Messenger	Gavin Rose	3 episodes	
2023	Wellmania	Chad	3 episodes	
2019-2021	Hardball	Bevan Stone	14 episodes	
2020	The Secrets She Keeps	Detective Poulos	3 episodes	
2014-2020	Black Comedy	Guest Cast	3 episodes	
2016	The Code	Gary Hunter / Youngblood	3 episodes	
2014	Wingman	Scott	7 episodes	
2014	The Kangaroo Gang	Georgie Gardiner	1 episode	
2014	The Moodys	Hayden Roberts	1 episode	
2013	Wonderland	Jason	1 episode	
2013	Camp	Cop	1 episode	
2013	House Husbands	Liam	2 episodes	
2013	Crime Plays	Beau	Video Game	
2012	A Moody Christmas	Hayden Roberts	6 episodes	
2011	Underbelly: Razor	Greg 'The Gunman' Gaffney	8 episodes	
2011	At Home with Julia	Male Journo	1 episode	
2011	Home and Away	Brodie Upton	10 episodes	
2009	Double Take	Various	11 episodes	
2007	Hammer Bay	Mike Richmond	TV movie	
2005	All Saints	Stuart Mapleston	20 episodes	

=== Film appearances ===
Year	Title	Role	Notes	Ref
2004	Rapid Fear	Nick Morelli		
2009	Invasion	Simon	Short film	
2010	It's a Treat	David	Short film	
2011	Cupid	Cupid	Short film	
2011	Liv	Sam	Short film	
2012	Awkward Horse	Various		
2012	Almost	Tom	Short film	
2012	The Red Valentine	The Man	Short film	
2012	Silver Stiletto	Silver Stiletto	Short film	
2012	Census	Davin	Short film	
2014	A Better Man		Short film	
2015	Life After Death	Joe	Short film	
2015	Super Awesome!	Gary Eastwood		
2015	Doing Time	David	Short film	
2015	Bedlam	George Kilner		
2015	The Witching Hour	Man	Short film	
2016	Unified	Dalton Evans	Short film	
2016	Drone	Dalton		
2017	Going Vego	Ian	Short film	
2020	The Immortal	The Immortal	Short film	

Writing credits
Year	Title	Role	Notes	Ref
2024	Dance Spies	Writer/Creator	2 episode	
2023–present	Spooky Files	Writer/Creator	10 episodes	
2019-21	Hardball	Writer/Creator	22 episodes	
2018	News of the Wild	Writer		
2016	Hardball	Writer	Short film	
2015	Super Awesome!	Writer		
2012	Awkward Horse	Writer		

=== Director ===
Year	Title	Role	Notes
2027	Emma's Dance Club	Director	
2026	Caper Crew	Director	5 episodes
2023–present	Spooky Files	Director	5 episodes
2021	Hardball	Director	3 episodes
2016	Hardball	Director	Short film
2015	Super Awesome!	Director	
2012	Awkward Horse	Director	

== Theatre credits ==
Year	Title	Role	Notes	Ref
2025	Emerald City		Ensemble Theatre	
2020	Crunch Time	Luke	Ensemble Theatre	
2018	Degenerate Art	Himmier	Red Line	
2016	Betrayal	Robert	Ensemble Theatre	
2015	Dream Home	Paul	Ensemble Theatre	
2013–14	Rupert	Young Rupert	Playhouse, Melbourne, Theatre Royal, Sydney	
2014	The Witches	All	Malthouse Theatre	
2006–08, 2010	Holding the Man		Stables Theatre, Sydney, Belvoir Street Theatre, Sydney Opera House, Brisbane Powerhouse, Malthouse Theatre, Trafalgar Studios, London	
	The Lover			
2010	Orestes 2.0		Stables Theatre, Sydney	
	Fortune and Men's Eyes			
2008	Emergency		NIDA Parade 2 Studio	
2008	Pool (No Water)		Darlinghurst Theatre	
2007	Toy Symphony		Belvoir Street Theatre	
2007	The Merchant of Venice		Belvoir Street Theatre	
2006	The Cold Child (Das Kalte Kind)		Stables Theatre, Sydney	
2002	Building the Wall		QUT	
2001	Dirty Caff		Cement Box Theatre, Brisbane	
	It's About Time		World premiere in London	
