= Amanda Bishop =

Australian actress, singer and comedian

- Born: Amanda Diana Bishop; 10 December 1979 (age 46); Bunnan, Australia
- Other name: Mandy Bishop
- Education: University of New England
- Occupations: Actress, comedian
- Years active: 1996–present
- Known for: Impersonation of Julia Gillard

Amanda Diana Bishop (born 10 December 1979) is an Australian actress and comedian, known for her comedy portrayals of Julia Gillard, the former Prime Minister of Australia, in the television comedy At Home with Julia. Bishop had previously portrayed Gillard in the series Double Take, when Gillard was Deputy Prime Minister of Australia.

== Early life and education ==
Raised in Bunnan in the Hunter Region of New South Wales, Bishop gained a degree in music from the University of New England, and then trained at the Western Australian Academy of Performing Arts.

== Career ==
Bishop has collaborated with producer Michael Bourchier on two children's television series: The Upside Down Show, on which she played the role of Mrs. Foil in every episode, and Penelope K, by the way, on which she played the title role.

Bishop first impersonated Julia Gillard as part of Waiting for Garnaut, the 2008 Wharf Revue by the Sydney Theatre Company's Jonathan Biggins, Phillip Scott and Drew Forsythe. She reprised the role for the short-lived sketch comedy Double Take. A clip filmed for Double Take of Bishop performing "9 to 9", a parody of "9 to 5" mocking Kevin Rudd's reputation for working his staff hard, was a hit on YouTube after Gillard became Prime Minister and the skit was mentioned on Q&A by Magda Szubanski. In 2011 Bishop co-wrote, and portrayed Gillard in, the four-part sitcom, At Home with Julia, on ABC1 lampooning the relationship between Gillard and her real partner Tim Mathieson (played by Bishop's Myles Barlow co-star, Phil Lloyd). Bishop reprised the Gillard character once again, among other roles, in the comedy series Wednesday Night Fever.

In 2017, she appeared in the children's television series Drop Dead Weird.

== Filmography ==
=== Film ===
Year	Title	Role	Notes
1996	Gunsmoke		Short film
1998	Big Sky	Perilous Date 1	
1999	Fresh Air	Candy	
2001	The New Crusaders		Short film
2001	The Big Check Out	Tempe	Short film
2003	Survival of the Fittest	Penelope Brambles	Short film
2005	Amorality Tale	Amanda	Short film
2008	When the Eye Winks at the Hand	Beth	Short film
2010	Legend of the Guardians: The Owls of Ga'Hoole	Additional Voices	
2010	Des: The Reality of a Digital Stuntman	Sally	Short film
2012	Prudence Pecker	Prudence Pecker	Short film
2013	The Outlaw Michael Howe	Susan	Television film
2017	The Rip		Voice role
2017	Next Is the One	Alice	Short film
2018	The Way It Goes	Trudy	Short film
2021	Canvas	Jackie Rohan	Voice role
2021	Ladies First		Short film
2021	Odette	Odette	Short film
2023	Fighting	Xavier's mother	Short film
TBA	Black Canvas	Woman in Bar	Short film

=== Television ===
Year	Title	Role	Notes
1996	Heartbreak High	Cult Girl 1	1 episode
1997	Big Sky	Female Officer	1 episode
1999	BackBerner		1 episode
1999-2004	Blue Heelers		1 episode
2002-2006	All Saints	Theresa Pye/Ms. Alexander	
2006	The Upside Down Show	Mrs. Foil	
2008-2010	Review with Myles Barlow	Catherine Barlow	
2009	Double Take	Various Characters	
2009	My Place	Janice	
2010	Penelope K, by the Way	Penelope	
2010	Rescue: Special Ops	Anna Jacoby	1 episode
2010	Rake	Scarlet's Lawyer	1 episode
2011	At Home with Julia	Julia Gillard	
2011	Some Say Love	Various Characters	1 episode
2013	Wednesday Night Fever	Various Characters	
2015	Maximum Choppage	Angela Newdice	1 episode
2015	Pypo		1 episode
2016	Law & Order: Special Victims Unit	Heidi Aronson	1 episode
2017-2019	Drop Dead Weird	Mum	
2022	Remember My Name	Aunt Janine	
2024-2025	Home and Away	Dr. Liz Shaw	
