= Rupert (play) =

2013 play written by David Williamson

- Original language: English
- Written by: David Williamson
- Subject: Rupert Murdoch
- Setting: Rupert Murdoch; Elisabeth Murdoch; Margaret Thatcher; James Murdoch; Kerry Packer; Gough Whitlam; Tony Blair; Bob Hawke; Harry Evans

Premiere
- Date: August 29, 2013
- Place: Melbourne

Rupert is a 2013 play by David Williamson about Rupert Murdoch.

== Background ==
Williamson was approached to write the play for the Melbourne Theatre Company.

"If you’re doing big canvas, you’ve got to be passionate that the way the world is heading is not good," he said. "I still buy The Australian every morning, to enrage me and give me energy to get through the day... If I can do something before I die that casts some kind of warning, in a dramatically viable way, then that could be useful."

Williamson explained his approach to writing:

I tried as much as I can to tell the story through his own voice, his own ideology, his own triumphalism, so it’s Rupert’s cabaret. He’s telling the audience what a fantastic legacy he has left the world and he truly believes it.... Brett [Sheehy, MTC’s artistic director] was adamant and I agreed it shouldn’t be a lefty playwright beating Rupert around the head and telling the audience with every line how awful he was. That would be boring and predictable.

The author spent 18 months researching and writing the play. The playwright later said:

The more I read the less I thought he was just a businessman interested in profits. He’s interested in power and not just for its own sake. He believes his ideological message is necessary for the world to learn. He’s a quasi-politician, he’s an ideologue and he wants his opinion to be taken notice of. In his head, he’s beneficial to the human race because his support for free market economics has allowed people in places like China and India to rise out of poverty.

Williamson said he saw parallels between Murdoch and Shakespeare's Richard III.

The insignificant little hunchback by a combination of cunning, boldness, utter ruthlessness, charm, when necessary, and a sense of timing becomes King of England. Rupert, of course, hasn’t murdered his brother and seduced the wife of the man he’s just murdered within the first 10 minutes of the play, but then Richard comes to a grisly end, whereas Rupert survives everything and his share prices and fortune keep rising. So in that sense his story is even more remarkable.

“It’s not a typical Williamson comedy," the playwright added. “It harks back more to the rambunctious theatrical near-cabaret style of my early work for the APG [the Australian Performing Group]."

== Productions ==
The premiere 2013 production was reviewed by the Murdoch-owned Herald Sun but the review was never published. However reviews of the play were published in other Murdoch-owned newspapers.

The production was reviewed by The Washington Post as an entry in the Kennedy Center’s World Stages International Theater Festival, March 2014.
