= Jim Russell (actor) =

Australian actor and comedian

- Born: James Russell
- Occupations: Comedian, actor
- Years active: 1992–present

James Russell is an Australian comedian and actor, best known for appearing in the television series Comedy Inc.. He has also featured in Australian films, sitcoms, and dramas.

Russell toured throughout Europe and North America during 2007 and 2008 with the production of 'Soft'. In 2009, he played the title role in the Malthouse Theatre production of Goodbye Vaudeville Charlie Mudd.
