= Genevieve Morris =

Australian comedian and actress (born 1967)

- Born: Australia
- Occupations: Actress, comedian
- Known for: Comedy Inc; Ride Like a Girl

Genevieve Morris (born 1967) is an Australian comedian and actress, best known for being among the regular cast on the popular comedy series Comedy Inc and appearing in a popular advertising campaign for ANZ.

She has also had recurring roles in Seven Network police dramas Blue Heelers and City Homicide. She has performed in various stage productions since the early 1990s including the 2009 comedy show Spontaneous Broadway as Dame Helen Highwater, alongside Ross Daniels, Julia Zemiro and Geoff Paine.

In 2010, she appeared in multiple television commercials for ANZ bank portraying "Barbara the bank manager". In 2011, Morris was part of the ensemble cast of the short-lived television series Ben Elton Live From Planet Earth where she was considered by some to be the program's breakout star. In 2013, she was a cast member of Wednesday Night Fever

Morris starred in the crime comedy series No Activity as dispatch officer Carol. She also starred as a sonographer in a Doritos television commercial which was the runner-up in the 2016 Crash the Super Bowl competition.

In 2017, Morris was diagnosed with non-Hodgkin's lymphoma, forcing her to pull out of a starring role in comedy series Sando with her role re-cast while she sought treatment. Morris is in remission after chemotherapy, and continued guest roles in The Family Law and True Story with Hamish & Andy as well as stage work.

In 2019, Morris joined the second season of comedy Squinters. Morris was named as part of the Deadloch cast for series 2.

== Filmography ==
=== Films ===
| Year | Title | Role | Notes |
|---|---|---|---|
| 2023 | Jones Family Christmas | Peta | |
| 2023 | Run Rabbit Run | | (uncredited) |
| 2020 | Paper Champions | Linda | |
| 2020 | The Man With the Golden Throat | Judith | Short |
| 2019 | Ride Like a Girl | Joan Sadler | |
| 2018 | That's Not My Dog! | Herself | |
| 2012 | Circle of Lies | Pamela Stammer | |
| 2012 | The Anti-Social Network | Laptop Thief | Short film |
| 2011 | Little Johnny: The Movie | Little Johnny | Voice role |
| 2000 | Trapped | Fran | |
| 1999 | Strange Fits of Passion | Church Woman | |
| 1997 | Back from the Dead | Ruby | |
| 1994 | Metal Skin | Drag Fan | |

=== Television ===
| Year | Title | Role | Notes |
|---|---|---|---|
| 2026 | Deadloch | Pat Heffernan | TV series: 6 episodes |
| 2024 | Colin from Accounts | Peta | 1 episode |
| 2023 | Scrublands | Flick | 4 episodes |
| 2021 | Fraud Festival | Genevieve Lane | TV Movie |
| 2019-2020 | Bloom | Rhonda Stokes | 12 episodes |
| 2019 | Squinters | Alison | 3 episodes |
| 2019 | KGB | Captain Stokes | 5 episodes |
| 2019 | Mr Black | Daina Robson | 3 episodes |
| 2019 | Get Krack!n | Marie Nash | 1 episode |
| 2017-19 | The Family Law | Lorraine | 2 episodes |
| 2015-18 | No Activity | Carol | 13 episodes |
| 2017-18 | True Story with Hamish & Andy | TAFE Teacher / Nurse Betty | 2 episodes |
| 2017 | Sisters | Iris | 1 episode |
| 2017 | Sexy Herpes | Barb | 6 episodes |
| 2016 | Little Acorns | Chef | 2 episodes Producer (9 episodes) |
| 2016 | Comedy Showroom | Wendy | Segment: Bleak |
| 2015–present | No Activity | Carol | Main cast |
| 2015 | Sammy J & Randy in Ricketts Lane | Police Woman | 2 episodes |
| 2013 | Wednesday Night Fever | Various characters | 7 episodes Writer (1 episode) |
| 2011 | Ben Elton Live from Planet Earth | Various characters | 3 episodes |
| 2008-2011 | City Homicide | Rhonda 'Ronnie' Lafferty | 22 episodes |
| 2003-2006 | Comedy Inc. | Various characters | 75 episodes |
| 2003 | MDA | Sue Berry | Episode: "Second Bite" |
| 2000 | Dogwoman: Dead Dog Walking | Arlene | TV movie |
| 1998 | Small Tales & True | Moi | Episode: "Holy Matrimony" |
| 1997 | State Coroner | Helen Lawler | Episode: "'Till Death Do Us Part" |
| 1994-2001 | Blue Heelers | Various characters | 5 episodes |
