= Bunnan, New South Wales =

Bunnan New South Wales
- Coordinates: 32°02′S 150°36′E
- Population: 94 (SAL 2021)
- Postcode(s): 2337
- LGA(s): Upper Hunter Shire
- State electorate(s): Upper Hunter
- Federal division(s): Hunter

Bunnan is a town in the Upper Hunter Shire in the Hunter Region of New South Wales, Australia. It is located on Bunnan Road east of Merriwa about 270 kilometres north of Sydney, and is part of the Hunter (federal) and Upper Hunter (state) electorates. Bunnan is an agricultural area known for cattle and sheep farming.

== History ==
Bunnan Post Office opened on 1 September 1876 and closed in 1986.
