= Mills Entertainment =

American live entertainment company

- Type: Private
- Industry: live entertainment
- Founded: 2003; 23 years ago
- Founder: Michael Mills
- Headquarters: Saratoga Springs, New York, United States
- Area served: Worldwide
- Key people: Michael Mills (CEO)
- Website: millsentertainment.com

Mills Entertainment is an American live entertainment production company based in Saratoga Springs, New York. Founded in 2003 by Michael Mills, it develops, finances, and promotes live shows and touring productions in collaboration with agencies, intellectual property owners, and media networks.

== History ==
Mills Entertainment was founded in 2003 by Michael Mills in upstate New York. Its first professional booking was a performance by the magicians Penn & Teller at Proctors Theatre in Schenectady, New York. In 2003, Mills Entertainment produced a comedy tour featuring improv performers Colin Mochrie and Brad Sherwood; the tour expanded to over 500 performances and grossed an estimated $30 million.

In its early years, Mills Entertainment concentrated on comedy programming. Tours such as the Laughter Arts Festival (LAF), The Nobodies of Comedy, NBC's Last Comic Standing Live, and Comedy Central on Campus brought emerging stand-up performers into theatre and performing-arts-centre circuits. Comedians who appeared on these tours in some of their first theatre engagements include Jim Gaffigan, John Mulaney, Amy Schumer, and Andrew Schulz.

By 2010, Mills Entertainment expanded its offerings to include live tours with reality television personalities, such as a stage shows for the likes of Anthony Bourdain, Cesar Millan, and Buddy Valastro of the series Cake Boss. By the mid-2010s, it began producing tours for digital content creators. In 2014, it produced the "Tyler Oakley’s Slumber Party" tour, which grossed approximately $1.3 million. In 2015, it organized a global tour for the YouTube personality Lilly Singh.

In April 2015, Creative Artists Agency (CAA) acquired an equity stake in Mills Entertainment. Following the investment, Mills Entertainment continued to operate as an independent subsidiary and in 2016 opened an office in Los Angeles. Also, in 2016, Mills Entertainment, Bethany Mota, Tyler Oakley and CAA jointly launched Camp17, a series of themed summer camps featuring digital influencers.

In 2016, Mills Entertainment launched the touring stage adaptation Daniel Tiger's Neighborhood Live!, based on the PBS Kids series from Fred Rogers Productions; by the end of 2021 the production had played more than 200 performances in over 120 North American cities and earned more than US$13 million in ticket sales. In 2018, the company partnered with Mattel's American Girl brand to produce American Girl Live, a touring musical inspired by the doll line. In 2019, Mills Entertainment announced a partnership with Hasbro for a touring musical based on My Little Pony.

From 2020 to 2021, live productions were suspended during the COVID-19 pandemic, with operations resuming as public health restrictions were lifted.

In September 2025, Mills Entertainment, in partnership with Clearly Canadian, Maximum Effort, and Amazon MGM Studios, announced a national tour featuring actor Ryan Reynolds to support the release of John Candy: I Like Me, which Reynolds produced.

== Productions ==
Mills Entertainment produces a diverse range of live touring shows such as spoken-word events, theatrical adaptations, family entertainment, and celebrity appearances. It manages creative development, financing, marketing, and logistics for its productions.

Mills Entertainment was an early producer of live tours for social media personalities. It created touring shows for Lilly Singh and for Kristin Hensley and Jen Smedley of the web series "#IMOMSOHARD," whose production was named "Comedy Tour of the Year" at the 2018 Spotlight Awards. Mills Entertainment has also licensed intellectual property for live events, including Daniel Tiger's Neighborhood Live!, Elf on the Shelf: A Christmas Musical, and American Girl Live. It has interactive "evening with" events with film legends such as Jane Fonda, William Shatner, Mel Brooks, and John Cleese.

In a joint initiative with television networks, Mills Entertainment has created live stage adaptations of popular series. Notable productions include Theresa Caputo Live! The Experience, based on the TLC series Long Island Medium, and Bring It! Live, a stage version of the Lifetime dance competition show.
