= Rebecca De Unamuno =

Australian actress and comedian

- Born: Rebecca De Unamuno
- Occupations: Actress, comedian
- Years active: 1998–present

Rebecca De Unamuno is an Australian actress and comedian. She has written and performed for a number of television comedy series, short films and stand up comedy shows. In 2013 she starred in Spank! The Fifty Shades Parody.

== Career ==
In 2001, she started her career on the popular The Glass House. She was part of the team that won the Improv World Cup at the Just For Laughs Festival in 2001 and was named Player of the Tournament. Between 2003 and 2004, she played various characters in Big Bite, before its cancellation. She appeared in and wrote for the Hamish & Andy Show and Kath & Kim. During 2003 to 2006, she guest appeared in Comedy Inc. and in 2007, the show's final season, she became a main cast member. In 2009, she played a teacher in Thick as Thieves. She appeared on The Chaser's War on Everything during 2009.

She is a regular guest on Richard Glover's weekly comedy wrap-up Thank God It's Friday on 702 ABC Sydney.
