= At Home with Julia =

Australian television series

- Genre: Sitcom
- Starring: Amanda Bishop; Phil Lloyd
- Country of origin: Australia
- No. of seasons: 1
- No. of episodes: 4

Production
- Executive producers: Rick Kalowski; Debbie Lee; Greg Quail
- Producer: Carol Hughes
- Production company: Quail Television

Original release
- Network: ABC1
- Release: 7 September – 28 September 2011

At Home with Julia is a four-part Australian sitcom television series, created and written by Amanda Bishop, Rick Kalowski and Phil Lloyd, which debuted on 7 September 2011 on ABC1. A re-run of the series aired on ABC2 in April 2012. The series ran in syndication in the United States on the Vibrant TV Network.

The series depicts a fictional representation of the relationship between Julia Gillard, the actual Prime Minister of Australia (played by Amanda Bishop), and Gillard's real-life partner, Tim Mathieson (played by Phil Lloyd). Fictionalised versions of actual Australian politicians and media personalities are portrayed throughout the series. Much of the action takes place at The Lodge, the prime minister's official residence in the national capital of Canberra.

Although the first episode was received either relatively well or neutrally by the media, many critics responded negatively to the series' end. Some saw At Home with Julia as defying previous boundaries in political satire and political parody, with its emphasis on a female politician's personal life rather than her politics and public life. In particular, the media, viewers, and politicians were scandalised by the notorious "flag scene" from Episode 3 ("The Leaker")—in which the prime minister and partner Tim Mathieson were depicted apparently naked and post-coital under the Australian flag.

The series was a 2012 Australian Academy of Cinema and Television Arts Awards nominee for Best Television Comedy Series. Criticised by several social commentators as inappropriately disrespectful to the office of Prime Minister, the show nevertheless proved very popular both with television audiences – becoming the most watched Australian scripted comedy series of 2011 – and with television critics. According to media reports, international versions of the series were in development in the United Kingdom and Europe. None of these shows were commissioned.

The series was sold to the United States for broadcast in 2012 and can be viewed on Hulu.

In February 2013, the notorious "flag sex-scene" from Episode 3 ("The Leaker") was featured in the ABC1 series Shock Horror Aunty!, a compilation of the Australian Broadcasting Corporation's most controversial broadcast comedy incidents.

A second series was not produced due to the uncertainty regarding the real Gillard's tenure as prime minister. Amanda Bishop did reprise the role of Gillard for Wednesday Night Fever, however the real Gillard was ousted as Labor Party leader and thus Prime Minister just prior to the show's debut on ABC1.

In an atmosphere of budgetary cuts to the ABC and severe criticism of its use of political satire, no follow-up series has been produced about Tony Abbott, or any subsequent Prime Minister.

== Cast ==
=== Main / regular ===
- Amanda Bishop as Prime Minister of Australia Julia Gillard
- Phil Lloyd as Tim Mathieson
- Michael Denkha as Jesus the Cleaner
- Georgina Naidu as Georgina
- Craig McLachlan as Steve the Gardener
- Alan Dukes as Deputy Prime Minister of Australia Wayne Swan
- Jonathan Biggins as former (1991–96) Australian prime minister Paul Keating
- Joel Barker as Naughty Kid 1
- Jack Dawes as Naughty Kid 2
- Jack Versace as Naughty Kid 3

=== Recurring / guests ===
- Martin Thomas as Agent Thompson
- David Callan as Agent Smith
- Paul McCarthy as Minister for Foreign Affairs and former (2007–10) Prime Minister, Kevin Rudd
- Stephen Leeder as Special Agent Mervyn Fairmeadow
- Peter Carmody as Tony Windsor
- Drew Forsythe as independent Member of Parliament Bob Katter
- Jim Russell as independent Member of Parliament Rob Oakeshott
- Nicholas Cassim as Leader of the Opposition Tony Abbott
- Geoff Moxham as radio journalist Alan Jones
- Georgina Naidu as Georgina
- Jonathan Biggins as television journalist Tony Jones
- Chris Taylor as Jase, Canberra Local
- Amanda Bishop as Deputy Leader of the Opposition Julie Bishop
- Meaghan Davies as Brianna, Canberra local
- Guy Edmonds as male journalist
- Lisa Adam as female journalist
- Di Adams as supermarket shopper
- Greg Quail as newsreader
- Glenn Hazeldine as supermarket meat salesman
- Mandy McElhinney as newsagent
- Krew Boylan as checkout chick
- Ben Oxenbould as head protester
- Patrick Brammall as Bernard the ALP genius
- Wildenfox Pavarotti as 'Bill Shorten', the dog

== Episodes ==
Episode No.	Title	Directed by	Written by	Original Air Date
1	"Date Night"	Erin White	Amanda Bishop, Rick Kalowski & Phil Lloyd	7 September 2011
Australian Prime Minister (PM) Julia Gillard's life is hectic, although much of her time is taken up trying to politely hang up on Paul Keating, a former PM from her Australian Labor Party, who keeps phoning her with unsolicited advice. The life of Julia's non-celebrity partner, Tim Mathieson, is anything but hectic; he fills in time by running household errands for the PM's official residence—The Lodge—since staff cover all the gardening and house-cleaning. Julia and Tim try to reserve space on the calendar to be alone together, but their "date night" keeps getting rescheduled, this time because Julia has to invite three independent members of the Australian House of Representatives (Bob Katter, Tony Windsor and Rob Oakeshott) to the Lodge for dinner, to discuss their demand to prohibit imported food. Problem is, the Lodge's beer fridge is filled with imported beer, and the local butcher only stocks (very expensive) imported meat. Meanwhile some neighbourhood kids get hold of a gun which a member of the PM's security team, parked in the street, had placed on the car dashboard so he could sleep more comfortably.
2	"Code Ranga"	Erin White	Amanda Bishop, Rick Kalowski & Phil Lloyd	14 September 2011
Tim is to cut Julia's hair at a local school to promote an apprenticeships program for Muslim youths. When Tim borrows Julia's car to drive to the school, her security team follows it thinking she is driving. Meanwhile Julia is trapped in the bathroom when the handle breaks, although she manages to climb out a window and hail a cab driven by Afghan refugee Aarif who gets lost amongst Canberra's numerous roundabouts. When it is realised that the Prime Minister is missing, Tim is grilled by a hard-nosed federal police agent who is still wracked with guilt regarding his failures in the 1967 disappearance of then Prime Minister Harold Holt.
3	"The Leaker"	Erin White	Amanda Bishop, Rick Kalowski & Phil Lloyd	21 September 2011
Julia and Tim plan a big announcement at Tim's birthday but have a catastrophic misunderstanding over what it is. Julia is also convinced her Minister for Foreign Affairs, and previous PM, Kevin Rudd has been leaking information.
4	"Citizens' Assembly"	Erin White	Amanda Bishop, Rick Kalowski & Phil Lloyd	28 September 2011
Tim and Julia have split up, but are trying to keep it from the media. Julia tries to sound more refined on Alan Jones' radio show, but later loses her voice due to the stress of losing Tim. Julia's predecessor as PM, Kevin Rudd, kindly offers to take her place on the TV talk show Q&A.

== Viewership ==
No.	Title	Air date	Timeslot	Overnight ratings		Ref(s)
No.	Title	Air date	Timeslot	Viewers	Rank	Ref(s)
1	Date Night	7 September 2011	Wednesday 9:30 pm – 10:00 pm	1,179,687	6	
2	Code Ranga	14 September 2011	Wednesday 9:30 pm – 10:00 pm	1,044,108	11	
3	The Leaker	21 September 2011	Wednesday 9:30 pm – 10:00 pm	903,731	11	
4	Citizens' Assembly	28 September 2011	Wednesday 9:30 pm – 10:00 pm	751,000	18	

== Awards and nominations ==
Year	Award	Category	Nominee	Result	Ref
2012	AACTA Awards	Best Television Comedy Series	Rick Kalowski, Greg Quail & Carol Hughes	Nominated	
2012	Equity Awards	Most Outstanding Performance by an Ensemble in a Comedy Series	Amanda Bishop, Phil Lloyd, Peter Carmody, Michael Denkha, Craig McLachlan, Georgina Naidu, Al Dukes, Paul McCarthy, Jonathan Biggins, Jim Russell, Drew Forsythe, Joel Barker, Jack Dawes, Jack Versace, Pavarotti the Dog	Won	
2012	AWGIE Awards	Outstanding Comedy Writing – Situation or Narrative: Episode 1 ("Date Night")	Amanda Bishop, Rick Kalowski & Phil Lloyd	Nominated	
2012	AWGIE Awards	Outstanding Comedy Writing – Situation or Narrative: Episode 3 ("The Leaker")	Amanda Bishop, Rick Kalowski & Phil Lloyd	Nominated	
