= 3rd AACTA Awards =

Australian film and television awards ceremony

- Date: 28 January 2014 and 30 January 2014
- Site: The Star Event Centre; Sydney, New South Wales
- Hosted by: Shane Bourne

Highlights
- Best Film: The Great Gatsby
- Most awards: Film: The Great Gatsby (12); TV: Top of the Lake, Power Games: The Packer-Murdoch War (3)
- Most nominations: Film: The Great Gatsby (14); TV: Top of the Lake (10)

Television coverage
- Network: Network Ten

The 3rd Australian Academy of Cinema and Television Arts Awards (generally known as AACTA Awards) are a series of awards which includes the 3rd AACTA Awards Luncheon, the 3rd AACTA Awards ceremony and the 3rd AACTA International Awards. The former two events were held at The Star Event Centre, in Sydney, New South Wales on 28 January and 30 January 2014, respectively. Presented by the Australian Academy of Cinema and Television Arts (AACTA), the awards celebrated the best in Australian feature film, television, documentary and short film productions of 2013. The AACTA Awards ceremony were televised on Network Ten. These awards were a continuum of the Australian Film Institute Awards (known as the AFI Awards), established in 1958 and presented until 2010, which was rebranded the AACTA Awards when the Australian Film Institute (AFI) established AACTA in 2011.

The Academy announced new television craft categories on 16 May 2013. However, a lack of funds and loss of a naming rights sponsor caused other categories to be either discontinued or merged with other awards. This included the merger of documentary craft categories into the new television craft prizes, which caused anger in the documentary making community. Due to the outcry, the Academy announced that it had received industry support and reinstated the documentary craft categories.

The nominees were announced during a press conference on 3 December 2013 in Sydney. The Great Gatsby (2013) received the most feature-film nominations with fourteen, earning a nomination in all categories, except for Best Original Screenplay. In television, Top of the Lake gained the most nominations with ten. Desert War and I Am A Girl earned four nominations each in the documentary field.

== Background ==
=== Category restructuring ===
In December 2012, AACTA launched a campaign for additional awards. The aim was to include craft awards for television, which the Academy acknowledged was a big gap in the AACTA Awards categories. After consulting various industry guilds in the Australian screen industry, AACTA announced seven new craft categories in the television field for: Best Direction in a Light Entertainment or Reality Series, Best Editing, Best Cinematography, Best Sound, Best Original Music Score, Best Production Design and Best Costume Design. However, a lack of funds, due to the loss of Samsung as a naming rights sponsor in September 2012, lead to the restructuring of some accolades by the Academy for the 2014 awards. The Best Comedy Series and Best Light Entertainment Series were merged into a single Best Television Comedy or Light Entertainment Series. The award for Best Screenplay in a Short Film, Best Visual Effects and Best Young Actor was removed. Several of the documentary awards were also cancelled, including: Best Documentary Under One Hour, Best Documentary Series, Best Direction in a Documentary, Best Cinematography in a Documentary, Best Sound in a Documentary and Best Editing in a Documentary. The documentary craft awards would instead fall under the newly established television craft categories.

This caused anger in the Australian documentary making community, who found the changes to be "completely unacceptable". Representatives of Australian documentary group OzDox, condemned the process by which the category restructuring was made, saying that no one from the documentary sector was consulted during the industry guild consultation period. Australian actor Josh Lawson felt the merger of the Best Comedy Series and Light Entertainment Series categories is "insulting", and the general lack of comedy awards is a "slap in the face" for people working on comedic productions. Following the outcry by OzDox, AACTA announced it had received industry support and reinstated the four documentary craft awards, and split the television directing categories into Best Direction in a Drama or Comedy and Best Direction in a Television Light Entertainment or Reality Series.

== Winners and nominees ==
The nominees were announced during a press conference on 3 December 2013 in Sydney. The nominations event was hosted by Rob Carlton and read by Rodger Corser and Gracie Otto. Of the nominees, The Great Gatsby (2013) received the most feature-film nominations with fourteen, including Best Film, Best Direction for Baz Luhrmann, Best Adapted Screenplay for Baz Luhrmann and Craig Pearce, Best Cinematography for Simon Duggan, Best Lead Actor for Leonardo DiCaprio, Best Lead Actress for Rose Byrne, Best Supporting Actor for Joel Edgerton, Best Supporting Actress for Elizabeth Debicki and Isla Fisher, and Best Original Music Score for Craig Armstrong. In television, Top of the Lake received the most nominations with ten. These include Best Telefeature or Mini Series, Best Direction in a Television Drama or Comedy, Best Cinematography in Television, Best Guest or Supporting Actor – Drama for Peter Mullan, and Best Guest or Supporting Actress – Drama for Robyn Nevin, and Best Original Music Score in Television.

=== Feature film ===
Best Film	Best Direction
The Great Gatsby – Baz Luhrmann, Catherine Martin, Douglas Wick, Lucy Fisher, and Catherine Knapman; Dead Europe – Emile Sherman, Iain Canning, and Liz Watts; Mystery Road – David Jowsey; The Rocket – Sylvia Wilczynski; Satellite Boy – David Jowsey, Julie Ryan, and Catriona McKenzie; The Turning – Robert Connolly, Maggie Miles, and The Turning Ensemble^{[A]}	Baz Luhrmann – The Great Gatsby; Ivan Sen – Mystery Road; Kim Mordaunt – The Rocket; The Turning Ensemble^{[A]} – The Turning
Best Original Screenplay	Best Adapted Screenplay
The Rocket – Kim Mordaunt; 100 Bloody Acres – Colin Cairnes and Cameron Cairnes; Drift – Morgan O'Neill and Tim Duffy; Mystery Road – Ivan Sen	The Great Gatsby – Baz Luhrmann and Craig Pearce, based on the novel of the same name by F. Scott Fitzgerald; Adoration – Christopher Hampton, based on The Grandmothers from the novel The Grandmothers: Four Short Novels by Doris Lessing; Dead Europe – Louise Fox, based on the novel of the same name by Christos Tsiolkas; The Turning – The Turning Ensemble, based on a collection of short stories by Tim Winton
Best Lead Actor	Best Lead Actress
Leonardo DiCaprio – The Great Gatsby as Jay Gatsby; Sitthiphon Disamoe – The Rocket as Ahlo; Ewen Leslie – Dead Europe as Isaac; Hugo Weaving – The Turning	Rose Byrne – The Turning; Carey Mulligan – The Great Gatsby as Daisy Buchanan; Tasma Walton – Mystery Road as Mary Swan; Naomi Watts – Adoration as Lil
Best Supporting Actor	Best Supporting Actress
Joel Edgerton – The Great Gatsby as Tom Buchanan; Marton Csokas – Dead Europe as Niko; Suthep Po-ngam – The Rocket as Purple; Angus Sampson – 100 Bloody Acres as Lindsay Morgan	Elizabeth Debicki – The Great Gatsby as Jordan Baker; Isla Fisher – The Great Gatsby as Myrtle Wilson; Mirrah Foulkes – The Turning; Alice Keohavong – The Rocket as Mali
Best Cinematography	Best Editing
The Great Gatsby – Simon Duggan; Drift – Geoffrey Hall; Goddess – Damian E. Wyvill; The Rocket – Andrew Commis	The Great Gatsby – Matt Villa, Jason Ballantine, and Jonathan Redmond; Mystery Road – Ivan Sen; The Rocket – Nick Meyers; The Turning – The Turning Ensemble
Best Original Music Score	Best Sound
The Great Gatsby – Craig Armstrong; Dead Europe – Jed Kurzel; Drift – Michael Yezerski; The Rocket – Caitlin Yeo	The Great Gatsby – Wayne Pashley, Jenny Ward, Fabian Sanjurjo, Steve Maslow, Phil Heywood, and Guntis Sics; Mystery Road – Lawrence Horne, Nick Emond, Joe Huang, Phil Judd, Les Fiddess, and Greg Fitzgerald; The Rocket – Sam Petty, Brooke Trezise, Nick Emond, Sam Hayward, and Yulia Akerholt; Satellite Boy – Phil Judd, Liam Egan, Nick Emond, Glenn Butler, Les Fiddess, and Jennifer Sochackyj
Best Production Design	Best Costume Design
The Great Gatsby – Catherine Martin, Karen Murphy, Ian Gracie, and Beverley Dunn; Adoration – Annie Beauchamp; Goddess – Annie Beauchamp; The Rocket – Pete Baxter	The Great Gatsby – Catherine Martin, Silvana Azzi Heras, and Kerry Thompson; Adoration – Joanna Mae Park; Goddess – Shareen Beringer; The Rocket – Woranun Pueakpun and Sylvia Wilczynski

=== Television ===
Best Drama Series	Best Television Comedy or Light Entertainment Series
Redfern Now – Darren Dale and Miranda Dear (ABC1); Offspring – John Edwards and Imogen Banks (Network Ten); Serangoon Road – Paul Barron and Nick North (ABC1); Wentworth – Jo Porter and Amanda Crittenden (SoHo)	Please Like Me – Todd Abbott (ABC2); The Agony of Life – Nicole Minchin, Amanda Brotchie, and Adam Zwar (ABC1); Gruen Nation – Sophia Zachariou, Jo Wathen, Wil Anderson, and Jon Casimir (ABC1); Shaun Micallef's Mad as Hell – Peter Beck; Upper Middle Bogan – Robyn Butler and Wayne Hope (ABC1)
Best Telefeature, Mini Series or Short Run Series	Best Children's Television Series
Top of the Lake – Emile Sherman, Iain Canning, Jane Campion and Philippa Campbell (UKTV); An Accidental Soldier – Kylie du Fresne and Sue Taylor (ABC1); Mrs Biggs – Kwadjo Dajan and Tony Wright (Seven Network); Power Games: The Packer-Murdoch War – John Edwards and Jodi Matterson (Nine Network)	Nowhere Boys – Tony Ayres and Beth Frey (ABC3); Dance Academy – Joanna Werner (ABC3); Peleda – Luke Jurevicius and Nathan Jurevicius (ABC3); You're Skitting Me – Toni Malone and Damian Davis
Best Reality Television Series	Best Screenplay
MasterChef Australia: The Professionals – Margaret Bashfield, David McDonald, Mark Barlin, and Tim Toni (Network Ten); Australia's Got Talent – Greg Beness and Steve Kelly (Nine Network); My Kitchen Rules – Matt Apps, Greg Swanborough and Evan Wilkes (Seven Network); The X Factor – Jonathon Summerhayes (Seven Network)	Offspring – Debra Oswald for "Episode 13" (Network Ten); Power Games: The Packer-Murdoch War – Samantha Winston for "Part One" (Nine Network); Redfern Now – Steven McGregor for "Babe in Arms" episode (ABC1); Upper Middle Bogan – Robyn Butler, Wayne Hope, and Gary McCaffrie for "No Angel" episode (ABC1)
Best Direction in a Drama or Comedy	Best Direction in a Television Light Entertainment or Reality Series
Geoff Bennett – Power Games: The Packer-Murdoch War for "Part One" (Nine Network); Rachel Ward – An Accidental Soldier (ABC1); Matthew Saville – Please Like Me for "Portuguese Custard Tarts" episode (ABC2); Garth Davis – Top of the Lake for "The Dark Creator" episode (UKTV)	Hamish & Andy's Gap Year Asia ("Episode 1: 'Week 1'") – Tim Bartley and Jo Siddiqui (Nine Network); Big Brother 10 ("Episode 1: 'Launch'") – Mark Adamson (Nine Network); MasterChef Australia: The Professionals ("Episode 13: 'Mansfield Offsite'") – Michael Venables (Network Ten); Studio at the Memo ("Episode 3: 'Anna Lumb/Briefs/Don Walker/Sheridan Harbridge/Kaki King'") – Ken Connor (Studio)
Best Lead Actor – Drama	Best Lead Actress – Drama
Lachy Hulme – Power Games: The Packer-Murdoch War as Frank Packer (Nine Network); Ernie Dingo – Redfern Now for "Dogs of War" episode as Ernie (ABC1); Remy Hii – Better Man as Van Tuong Nguyen (SBS); Meyne Wyatt – Redfern Now for "Babe in Arms" episode as Justin (ABC1)	Claudia Karvan – The Time of Our Lives as Caroline (ABC1); Marie Bunel – An Accidental Soldier (ABC1); Asher Keddie – Offspring as Dr. Nina Proudman (Network Ten); Sheridan Smith – Mrs Biggs as Charmian Biggs (Seven Network)
Best Guest or Supporting Actor – Drama	Best Guest or Supporting Actress – Drama
Luke Ford – Power Games: The Packer-Murdoch War ("Part 2") (Nine Network); Alexander England – Power Games: The Packer-Murdoch War ("Part 1") (Nine Network); Peter Mullan – Top of the Lake for "Episode 5" (UKTV); David Wenham – Better Man for "Part 2" (SBS)	Kat Stewart – Offspring for "Episode 9" (Network Ten); Kris McQuade – Wentworth for "Checkmate" as Rose Mitchell (SoHo); Heather Mitchell – Power Games: The Packer-Murdoch War for "Part 1" (Nine Network); Robyn Nevin – Top of the Lake for "A Rainbow Above Us" (UKTV)
Best Comedy Performance	Best Cinematography in Television
Shaun Micallef – Shaun Micallef's Mad as Hell for "Series 2" (ABC1); Lisa McCune – It's a Date for "When Should You Abandon A Date?" (ABC1); Robyn Nevin – Upper Middle Bogan (ABC1); Josh Thomas – Please Like Me (ABC2)	Top of the Lake – Adam Arkapaw for Episode 5: "The Dark Creator" (UKTV); An Accidental Soldier – Germain McMicking (ABC1); Mrs Biggs – Fabian Wagner for "Episode 3" (Seven Network); Redfern Now – Jules O'Loughlin for Episode 6: "Dogs of War" (ABC1)
Best Sound in Television	Best Original Music Score in Television
Top of the Lake – Richard Flynn, Tony Vaccher, John Dennison, Craig Butters, Danny Longhurst and Blair Slater for Episode 5: "The Dark Creator" (UKTV); Australia's Got Talent – John Simpson for Series 7, Episode 1: "Auditions" (Nine Network); Mrs Biggs – John Wilkinson, John Hughes, Clare Howarth, John Senior and John Whitworth for "Episode 5" (Seven Network); Redfern Now – Grant Shepherd, Wes Chew, Robert MacKenzie, Tom Herdman and Sam Gain-Emery for Episode 3: "Babes in Arms" (ABC1)	Redfern Now – Antony Partos for Episode 3: "Babes in Arms" (ABC1); Mrs Biggs – Bryony Marks for "Episode 3" (Seven Network); Nowhere Boys – Cornel Wilczek for "Episode 1" (ABC3); Top of the Lake – Mark Bradshaw for Episode 5: "The Dark Creator" (UKTV)
Best Production Design in Television	Best Costume Design in Television
Peleda – Nathan Jurevicius for Episode 3: "The Amber Shard" (ABC3); An Accidental Soldier – Clayton Jauncey (ABC1); Mrs Biggs – Pat Campbell for "Episode 5" (Seven Network); Top of the Lake – Fiona Crombie for Episode 5: "The Dark Creator" (UKTV)	Miss Fisher's Murder Mysteries – Marion Boyce for Series 2, Episode 1: "Murder Most Scandalous" (ABC1); An Accidental Soldier – Terri Lamera (ABC1); Mrs Biggs – Amy Roberts and Kitty Stuckey for "Episode 3" (Seven Network); Top of the Lake – Emily Seresin for Episode 5: "The Dark Creator" (UKTV)
Best Editing in Television
Mrs Biggs – Ben Lester and Mark Atkin for "Episode 3" (Seven Network); Power Games: The Packer-Murdoch War – Mark Perry for "Part 1" (Nine Network); Redfern Now – Dany Cooper for Episode 6: "Dogs of War" (ABC1); Top of the Lake – Scott Gray for Episode 5: "The Dark Creator" (UKTV)

=== Documentary ===
Best Feature Length Documentary	Best Documentary Television Program
Red Obsession – Warwick Ross; I Am A Girl – Rebecca Barry; Once My Mother – Rod Freedman; Shadow of Doubt – Eve Ash	Redesign My Brain – Paul Scott and Isabel Perez (ABC1); Desert War – Andrew Ogilvie, Andrea Quesnelle, and Phil Craig (ABC1); First Footprints – Martin Butler and Bentley Dean (ABC1); Jabbed – Love, Fear and Vaccines – Sonya Pemberton (SBS)
Best Direction in a Documentary	Best Cinematography in a Documentary
Warwick Ross and David Roach – Red Obsession; Anna Broinowski – Aim High in Creation; Rebecca Barry – I Am A Girl; Paul Scott – Redesign My Brain	Kakadu – Nick Robinson and Luke Peterson for Episode Four (ABC1); Desert War – Jim Frater for "Tobruk" (ABC1); I Am A Girl – Nicola Daley; Red Obsession – Lee Pullbrook and Steve Arnold
Best Editing in a Documentary	Best Sound in a Documentary
Desert War – Lawrie Silvestrin for "Tobruk" (ABC1); I Am A Girl – Lindi Harrison; In Bob We Trust – Lynn-Maree Milburn, Richard Lowenstein, Andrew de Groot, and Lora-Mae Adrao; Redesign My Brain – Philippa Rowlands for "Make Me Smarter"	Desert War – Ash Gibson Greig, Ric Curtin, Glenn Martin, Ash Charlton, and Chris Bollard for "Tobruk" (ABC1); Fallout – Antony Partos, Livia Ruzic, and Keith Thomas; Once My Mother – Cezary Skubiszewski, Michael Gissing, and Mark Keating; Red Obsession – Burkhard Dallwitz, Amanda Brown, Liam Egan, and Andrew Neil

=== Short film ===
Best Short Animation	Best Short Fiction Film
A Cautionary Tail – Pauline Piper and Simon Rippingale; Butterflies – Warwick Burton and Isabel Peppard; The Dukes of Bröxstônia – Stu Connolly; Woody – Stuart Bowen and Jodi Matterson	The Last Time I Saw Richard – John Molloy and Nicholas Verso; Perception – Lyn Norfor and Miranda Nation; Record – David Lyons and Dave Szamet; Tau Seru – Rodd Rathjen

== Productions with multiple nominations ==
=== Feature film ===
The following feature films received multiple nominations.

- Fourteen: The Great Gatsby (won 12)
- Twelve: The Rocket
- Seven: The Turning
- Six: Mystery Road
- Five: Dead Europe
- Four: Adoration
- Three: Drift and Goddess
- Two: 100 Bloody Acres and Satellite Boy

=== Television ===
The following television shows received multiple nominations.

- Ten: Top of the Lake (won 3)
- Eight: Mrs Biggs, Power Games: The Packer-Murdoch War (won 3), and Redfern Now
- Six: An Accidental Soldier
- Four: Offspring
- Three: Please Like Me and Upper Middle Bogan
- Two: Australia's Got Talent, MasterChef Australia: The Professionals, Nowhere Boys, Peleda, Shaun Micallef's Mad as Hell, and Wentworth

== See also ==
- 3rd AACTA International Awards

== Notes ==
A^{1} ^{2} : The Turning Ensemble consists of the seventeen people who directed their individual segments in the film. They are: Jonathan auf der Heide, Tony Ayres, Simon Stone, Jub Clerc, Robert Connolly, Shaun Gladwell, Rhys Graham, Justin Kurzel, Yaron Lifschitz, Anthony Lucas, Claire McCarthy, Ian Meadows, Ashlee Page, Stephen Page, Warwick Thornton, Marieka Walsh, Mia Wasikowska and David Wenham.
