= Rebecca Barry =

Australian director and producer

Rebecca Barry is an Australian film and television director and producer. In 2012, she co-founded the independent production company Media Stockade with Madeleine Hetherton-Miau.

Barry graduated from the Australian Film Television and Radio School (AFTRS) in 2003.

Her first feature film I Am A Girl (2013) was nominated for 4 AACTA awards including Best Direction in a Documentary and Best Direction in a Documentary Feature at the Australian Directors' Guild Awards. Barry was awarded the June Andrews Award for Women's Leadership in Media 2020 for Power Meri (2018).

== Filmography ==
Credit	Genre	Production	Year
Producer	Documentary Series	The Family Court Murders	2022
Producer	Documentary Series	Back to Nature	2021
Producer	Documentary Series	Debi Marshall Investigates: Frozen Lies	2019
Producer	Documentary	China Love	2018
Producer	Documentary	Power Meri	2018
Producer	Documentary	Disaster Capitalism	2018
Producer	Documentary Series	The Surgery Ship	2017
Producer	Documentary	The Opposition	2016
Producer	Documentary	The Surgery Ship	2015
Producer	Documentary Short	Psychics in the Suburbs	2015
Producer	Documentary	Call Me Dad	2015
Producer and Director	Documentary	I Am A Girl	2013
Producer	Reality TV	Undercover Boss Australia	2010
Director	Documentary Series	Lush House	2009
Director	Drama	Home and Away	2008
Director	Documentary Series	Inspiring Teachers	2008
Director	Documentary	Footy Chicks	2006
Director	Documentary	Beats Across Boarders	2005
Director	Drama	The Surgeon	2005
Producer	Documentary Short	A Modern Marriage	2003
Director	Documentary	You Am I: The Cream & the Crock	2003
Director	Documentary	The Space in Between	2002
Director	Documentary	The McDonagh Sisters	2003
Director	Documentary Series	Overture	2003
