= Pine Gap (TV series) =

Australian television series

- Title screen for season one
- Genre: Drama; Mystery; Thriller
- Created by: Greg Haddrick
- Directed by: Mat King
- Starring: Parker Sawyers; Tess Haubrich; Jacqueline McKenzie; Steve Toussaint; Stephen Curry
- Country of origin: Australia
- Original language: English
- No. of seasons: 1
- No. of episodes: 6

Production
- Executive producers: Bob Campbell; Rory Callaghan; Greg Haddrick; Sally Riley; Kym Goldsworthy
- Producers: Lisa Scott; Felicity Packard
- Production locations: Alice Springs, Adelaide
- Production companies: Screentime; South Australian Film Corporation; Screen Territory

Original release
- Network: ABC
- Release: 14 October 2018 – November 11, 2018

Pine Gap is an Australian television drama and thriller series that was released on Netflix and broadcast on ABC in 2018. The six-part series was written and created by Greg Haddrick and Felicity Packard. Mat King directed all six episodes. The series was produced by Screentime.

== Overview ==
Pine Gap is an international political thriller which is set around the Australian and United States joint defence intelligence facility at Pine Gap, south-west of the town of Alice Springs, Australia.

== Cast ==
- Parker Sawyers as Gus Thomson, United States mission director at Pine Gap
- Tess Haubrich as Jasmina Delic, Serbian Australian communications intelligence team leader
- Jacqueline McKenzie as Kath Sinclair, Australian deputy chief of the facility
- Steve Toussaint as Ethan James, American chief of the facility
- Stephen Curry as Jacob Kitto, Australian mission director seconded from the Australian Secret Intelligence Service
- Sachin Joab as Simon Penny, Australian communications intelligence analyst
- Mark Leonard Winter as Moses Dreyfus, American foreign instrumentation signals intelligence analyst
- Kelton Pell as Dr Paul Dupain, Elder of the Arrernte people and medical doctor
- Madeleine Madden as Immy Dupain, Arrernte activist and law student, Paul's daughter
- Lewis Fitz-Gerald as Rudi Fox, the American chief of intelligence operations
- Edwina Wren as Eloise Chambers, American imagery intelligence analyst
- Alice Keohavong as Deborah Vora, Laotian Australian electronic intelligence analyst in a lesbian relationship
- Jason Chong as Zhou Lin, executive for the Chinese state-owned mining company Shonguran
- Simone Kessell as Belle James, American wife of Ethan
- Milly Alcock as Marissa Campbell, Alice Springs local
- Michael-Anthony Taylor as Will Thompson, Gus's father
- Matt Holmes as PM Phillip Burke

== Episodes ==
No.	Title	Directed by	Written by	Original release date	Aus. viewers
1	"Episode 1"	Mat King	Felicity Packard	14 October 2018	581,000
The A-Crew intelligence team at the Pine Gap joint defence facility detects a missile launch in Myanmar that brings down a small passenger plane, killing all aboard, including four Americans. When satellite imagery reveals a cache of missiles in range of the APEC conference attended by the U.S. President Larry Kerr and the Australian Prime Minister Philip Burke, mission director Gus Thomson orders a drone strike. Zhou Lin, an executive of the Chinese mining company Shonguran, seeks to obtain land near the defence facility and is courting Alice Springs' Arrernte people, who own the land. His activities alarm the joint intelligence team, especially when Kath reveals to station chief Ethan James that the Australian government is allowing Lin to buy the land. Brilliant computer expert Moses Dreyfus discovers malware on the facility's servers, and reports it to chief of station James. He realises it can only have been installed by an insider.
2	"Episode 2"	Mat King	Greg Haddrick	14 October 2018	581,000
Ethan and Moses deduce that the spy installed the malware into the control room using a smartphone. The investigators suspect six members of the A-team, including Jasmina Delic and Gus Thomson, who develop a romantic relationship. The situation is compounded by news that Chinese have hacked into the Pentagon and the CIA headquarters. In the South China Sea's disputed Fiery Cross Reef, Chinese fighter jets disable a Malaysian naval warship with an EMP bomb, heightening regional tensions. While investigating the victims of the airplane crash in Myanmar, the A-team discover that the passengers included a Burmese man accused of raping Rohingya girls and a Hong Kong journalist with an "explosive story." Both the American and Australian teams suspect that the other team is withholding information.
3	"Episode 3"	Mat King	Greg Haddrick	21 October 2018	433,000
While the A-team monitor communications relating to the US President Kerr's visit to China, Ethan, Rudy Fox, and Kath Sinclair launch a secret twelve-day investigation of the A-team to find the spy. Fox and Ethan strongly believe Jas Delic is the spy. Delic, who is working on the Myanmar airplane case, relays Thomson's suspicions that the Rohingyans were behind the missile attack to Sinclair and Jacob Kitto, but Thomson has second thoughts about this hypothesis. While monitoring Kerr's communications, he discovers a message from the Hong Kong journalist killed on the destroyed plane which he thinks refers to information found on the phone of Robert Boyle, Chief of Staff to the Australian Prime Minister. He shares his thoughts with Delic, but she gets into trouble with Kitto when she hacks into Boyle's email account.
4	"Episode 4"	Mat King	Felicity Packard	28 October 2018	362,000
Australia-United States relations are made extremely fraught by a leaked audio recording of the US President Kerr disparaging Australia. As Thomson and Delic deepen their romantic relationship, Thomson informs his superior Fox and his father. Delic tells Thomson that she has learnt through her hack of Boyle's phone that the Australian Government is secretly negotiating a treaty of neutrality with China, information which he passes to James, Chief of Facility. Discontented with her husband Ethan's secrecy and lack of family attention, Belle James befriends Zhou Lin while visiting an Arrernte sacred site. Lin is courting the Arrernte people for the mining project, promising money and jobs. Meanwhile, Moses Dreyfus befriends a local teenage girl named Marissa Campbell, complicating the investigation.
5	"Episode 5"	Mat King	Felicity Packard	4 November 2018	358,000
Gus' plan to consider an NSA job offer at Fort Meade, Maryland strains his relationship with Jas. Strains between the Australian and American team leaders grow over their countries' conflicting relationships with China. Simon confesses to supplying the leaked audio of President Kerr to a pro-China Japanese blogger in exchange for payments to offset his mounting debts for his children's private school fees. In a show of military strength, the United States launches a pre-emptive strike on a Chinese facility on Hughes Reef. In retaliation, the Chinese down an American fighter jet. The conflict coincides with the activation of malware on the servers and the discovery of the destroyed smartphone trigger in the canteen.
6	"Episode 6"	Mat King	Greg Haddrick	11 November 2018	348,000
Pilot Captain Pearson survives the downing of his jet, but the Chinese are jamming the signals from his rescue device. A-Crew joins the effort to locate and extract Pearson, while also attempting to ascertain the identity of the malware activator. Moses is able to stop the malware download process from completing, but unable to prevent one file from being leaked. However, Jacob, Kath, Ethan and Rudi suspect Moses of being the culprit and bring him in for questioning, due to his poor judgment in starting a relationship with apparently underage Marissa. Moses denies being the spy, but confesses to giving Marissa $12,000 to settle her welfare fraud debts. Kath is informed that the missing file from the servers has been leaked to the public. The leaker is revealed to be Arrenrte law student Immy Dupain, daughter of an important elder. The file is a video showing Gus in his decision to conduct the drone strike. Belle James has an affair with Zhou, whose mining deal has been approved by the Aboriginal and Australian authorities. Kath is informed of the approval just as A-Crew locate Pearson and President Kerr is preparing to launch an attack on the Chinese to rescue him. Kath orders A-crew Australians to stop their operations, and Ethan manages to defuse the China standoff by convincing Kerr that the Chinese would deploy nuclear weapons if he was to follow through with his preparations. As the US and China enter into diplomatic negotiation, Simon strikes a deal with Kath to get back his A-team job in return for identifying the person who leaked the file to Immy. While police raid Eloise, Gus decides to remain at Pine Gap after his father believes that he helped save the President's life by deciding to execute the drone strike. Gus and Jas repair their relationship. Zhou meets with Immy, in a hint that she is working for Chinese intelligence.

== Reception ==
=== Critical response ===
Luke Buckmaster of The Guardian wrote that the "soporific" series was "less a spy drama than an attempt to cure insomnia." He also criticised the series for what he regarded as its poor story-writing and unsatisfactory acting, giving it one out of five stars, as "there is nothing remotely cinematic about the drama." Helen Razer of the Daily Review gave the series a negative review, disparaging it as "a poor attempt at promoting favourable propaganda about Australia–United States relations". She also criticized what she regarded as the token use of Aboriginal characters.

Pat LaMarco of The Daily Free Press described Pine Gap as a "dull and sluggish attempt at a thriller". He also viewed the show's release on Netflix as a sign of what he regarded as the deteriorating quality of its content, writing that "now we will be seeing critically acclaimed dramas...and low-quality, forgettable efforts such as Pine Gap on the same [streaming] service."

=== Nine-Dash Line controversy ===
Pine Gap was removed from the content streamed by Netflix in Vietnam by order of the country's Authority of Broadcasting and Electronic Information because a map with the nine-dash line was shown in two episodes of the series. This refers to contentious border issues in the South China Sea. It was in a context in which characters criticised China's claim over the waters in on-screen dialogue.

In November 2021, the Movie and Television Review and Classification Board of the Philippines ordered Netflix to remove certain episodes that featured the nine-dash line, deeming it "unfit for public exhibition" after the country's Department of Foreign Affairs issued a complaint calling the line "illegal" and a "violation of Philippine sovereignty".
