= Fiesta of the Damned =

Big Finish Productions audio drama
- Series: Doctor Who
- Release no.: 215
- Featuring: Seventh Doctor; Ace; Mel Bush
- Written by: Guy Adams
- Directed by: Ken Bentley
- Produced by: David Richardson
- Executive producers: Jason Haigh-Ellery; Nicholas Briggs
- Production code: BFPDWCD215
- Length: 120' approx
- Release date: August 2016
- Preceded by: A Life of Crime
- Followed by: Maker of Demons

Fiesta of the Damned is a Big Finish Productions audio drama based on the long-running British science fiction television series Doctor Who.

== Plot ==
The Seventh Doctor, Ace and Mel find themselves in late 1930s Spain during the time of its civil war.

== Cast ==
- The Doctor — Sylvester McCoy
- Ace — Sophie Aldred
- Mel — Bonnie Langford
- Juan Romero – Enzo Squillino Jnr
- George Newman – Christopher Hatherall
- Antonio Ferrando/Control Unit – Owen Aaronovitch
- Luis/Phillipe – Tom Alexander

Other parts portrayed by members of the cast.

== Reception ==
Starburst Magazine rated the audio drama at nine out of ten stars, writing that "despite the odd point at which it can drag, Fiesta of the Damned shines thanks to a great setting brought to life masterfully, a fierce alien menace, and some deep, well acted character stories." The Sci-Fi Bulletin's Paul Simpson also reviews Fiesta of the Damned favorably, calling it a "strong tale set against an unfamiliar backdrop."
