= Alice Keohavong =

Laotian Australian actress

- Born: Seattle
- Occupation: Actor
- Years active: 2009 -

Alice Keohavong is a Laotian Australian actress. She was nominated for the 2013 AACTA Award for Best Actress in a Supporting Role for her role in The Rocket.

== Filmography ==
=== TV ===
- The 21 Conspiracy (2009) Web series - Helen (2 episodes)
- All Saints (2009) TV Series - Mimi (1 episode)
- Redfern Now (2013) TV series - Reporter 2 (1 episode)
- Plans (2017) Mini series - Claire (3 episodes)
- Pine Gap (2018) TV series - Deb Vora (6 episodes)

=== Film ===
- The Rocket (2013) - Mali

== Theater ==
- A Ghost in My Suitcase
