= The Rocket (2013 film) =

2013 film

- Film poster
- Directed by: Kim Mordaunt
- Written by: Kim Mordaunt
- Produced by: Sylvia Wilczynski
- Starring: Sitthiphon Disamoe; Loungnam Kaosainam; Suthep Po-ngam
- Cinematography: Andrew Commis
- Edited by: Nick Meyers
- Music by: Caitlin Yeo
- Release dates: 10 February 2013 (Berlin); 8 June 2013 (Australia)
- Running time: 96 minutes
- Country: Australia
- Language: Lao

The Rocket (Lao: ບັ້ງໄຟ bangfai) is a 2013 Australian drama film written and directed by Kim Mordaunt. It is set entirely in Northern Laos, and spoken in the Lao language. As an Australian production, it was the country’s entry for Best Foreign Language Film at the 86th Academy Awards but was not nominated. The Rocket won the Audience Award and the award for Best Actor in a Narrative Feature Film at the Tribeca Film Festival. It was screened at the AFI Fest.

== Plot ==
In the Laos mountains, a woman named Mali (Alice Keohavong) gives birth to twins, of which one survives. Her husband's mother, Taitok (Bunsri Yindi) says that the living child must also die, because legend has it that when twins are birthed, one twin is blessed while the other is cursed. Believing her sole living son to be blessed, Mali refuses to kill him and so, she and Taitok keep it a secret from her husband, Toma (Sumrit Warin).

Seven years later, the living twin named Ahlo (Sitthiphon Disamoe) learns that a second dam is being built, so Toma takes Ahlo to see the dam, where a video is shown, revealing that the people of Ahlo's village will have to be relocated since the valley that they live in will be flooded between the two dams. So Ahlo and his family move through the woods, taking his boat with them, after much dispute. With the help of a ploughing buffalo, they manage to get the boat half way up the hill, only for the ropes to snap, sending the boat crashing into Mali, killing her. Furious, Taitok reveals to Toma that Ahlo is a twin and that "he should have died".

After burying Mali, Ahlo and his family ride a bus to their new village, which Taitok doesn't much like due to the running water and electricity that replaces their "traditions". Here, Ahlo meets a girl named Kia (Loungnam Kaosainam), who has lost her entire family (due to malaria) and now lives with her uncle, Purple (Suthep Po-ngam), who is a fan of James Brown. Kia shows Ahlo soft land for him to grow mangoes on, which he wishes to do in honour of his mother, but Toma forbids Ahlo from associating with them, making Ahlo destroy Toma's model house out of anger. He then visits Kia and Purple again and learns that all the electricity that was promised to the people are being used by the "hydro bosses". The following night, Ahlo sneaks out and attempts to get electricity for the people by hooking up some cables to the main power source, but owing to his bad luck, he ends up causing a blackout for everyone else except for Kia and Purple, who have electricity for their television set. The next day, Ahlo tells Kia about his tribe's tradition about being a cursed twin. When he accidentally desecrates a sacred shrine, Ahlo, Toma and Taitko have their house and belongings burnt in retaliation. Along with Kia and Purple, they all sneak out of the village in a cart filled with undetonated bombs from the war or UXO.

They journey for days and eventually arrive at Purple's village, which they call Paradise, which seems to have no other inhabitants. Ahlo and Kia run off into the bushes to play, but Ahlo almost sets off a bomb in the event of smashing fruit that Kia threw to him. Toma proposes moving again due to the land being surrounded by these dangerous bombs (which explains why there are no other inhabitants). While journeying for yet another home, Ahlo and company cross paths with a parade of travelers, where he hears an announcer mention a rocket competition that gives out cash prizes. While settling down, they are met by the village chief who tells them that the purpose of the contest is to launch them into the clouds in which they'll explode and produce rain. Believing this could break his curse, Ahlo announces his intentions to build a rocket and enter the contest to earn the money for them to buy a new home, but Toma and Taitko won't allow him, due to his presumed bad luck. Ahlo nevertheless still decides to build his own rocket and runs off.

While walking through the woods in search of things to build his rocket with, Ahlo comes across another unexploded bomb, but its hard casing proves to be usable for a rocket, but blows up seconds after Ahlo hits it with a rock; he survives. Later, Ahlo manages to get Purple (who turns out to be a former soldier) to help him build the rocket. Purple takes Ahlo to a bat cave to collect bat droppings that, according to Purple, can be used for blasting up the rocket. Inside the cave, Ahlo comes across a woman who considers him to be an evil spirit, causing him to run out of the cave screaming.

The rocket festival begins the next day. While some people are launching their rockets, Ahlo is still in the woods trying to put his together. He grinds the bat droppings into powder, but tests it out on a few mini rockets, to no avail, so Ahlo tries urinating on the bat dropping powder (advised by Purple, who said that can make it work better). In the contest, Toma launches his rocket, named Lucky, but lets go of it too soon and launches it poorly. A champion rocket named The Million is launched afterwards which successfully reaches the clouds. Ahlo brings his rocket in, which he calls The Bat, but the announcer tells him that kids aren't allowed to launch. Ahlo asks Toma to launch it, but Taitko doesn't allow him to, believing that The Bat will blow everyone up because of Ahlo's bad luck. Nobody else volunteers to do so and Ahlo then runs off. Toma decides to launch it anyway. Kia catches up to Ahlo and tells him what his father is doing, and so he runs back to the contest, thinking the rocket will kill Toma, and shouts his apology over the loud roaring of the rocket. The Bat is launched properly this time and it reaches the clouds. The Bat then surprisingly explodes inside the cloud, causing it to rain. Ahlo wins 10 million kip and is now no longer considered cursed.

== Cast ==
- Sitthiphon Disamoe as Ahlo
- Loungnam Kaosainam as Kia
- Suthep Po-ngam as Purple
- Bunsri Yindi as Taitok
- Sumrit Warin as Toma
- Alice Keohavong as Mali

== Reception ==
=== Critical response ===
The Rocket has an approval rating of 95% on review aggregator website Rotten Tomatoes, based on 64 reviews, and an average rating of 7.5/10. The website's critical consensus states: "A feel-good success crafted with care, Kim Mordaunt's story of two young kids in Laos is a heartfelt audience pleaser while remaining sensitive toward its subjects". Metacritic assigned the film a weighted average score of 72 out of 100, based on 15 critics, indicating "generally favorable reviews".

Sheri Linden of the Los Angeles Times gave a positive review, commenting "Mordaunt doesn't always succeed at balancing the sentimental, the political and the ethnographic, but at its strongest the story is a seamless melding of history's dark undertow and a child's indefatigable optimism." Joe Morgenstern of The Wall Street Journal called the characters "cliches" but the performances "utterly fresh". Avi Offer of NYC Movie Guru called the film "uplifting, engrossing and thrilling while remaining accessible to both art-house and mainstream audiences. It's destined to become a sleeper hit." Noah Berlatsky of The Dissolve called the film a "well-constructed delivery system for sparkly cheer, but it lacks a more substantial payload." Mark Adams of Screen International praised the film's visuals, calling them "a stunning location of Laos that provides an enthralling and evocative backdrop for writer/director Kim Mordaunt's engaging film The Rocket, a lush and bruising coming-of-age story."

=== Awards and nominations ===
| Award | Category | Subject | Result |
|---|---|---|---|
| AACTA Awards (3rd) | Best Film | Sylvia Wilczynski | Nominated |
| AACTA Awards (3rd) | Best Direction | Kim Mordaunt | Nominated |
| AACTA Awards (3rd) | Best Original Screenplay | Kim Mordaunt | Won |
| AACTA Awards (3rd) | Best Actor | Sitthiphon Disamoe | Nominated |
| AACTA Awards (3rd) | Best Supporting Actor | Suthep Po-ngam | Nominated |
| AACTA Awards (3rd) | Best Supporting Actress | Alice Keohavong | Nominated |
| AACTA Awards (3rd) | Best Cinematography | Andrew Commis | Nominated |
| AACTA Awards (3rd) | Best Editing | Nick Meyers | Nominated |
| AACTA Awards (3rd) | Best Original Music Score | Caitlin Yeo | Nominated |
| AACTA Awards (3rd) | Best Sound | Sam Petty | Nominated |
| AACTA Awards (3rd) | Best Sound | Brooke Trezise | Nominated |
| AACTA Awards (3rd) | Best Sound | Nick Emond | Nominated |
| AACTA Awards (3rd) | Best Sound | Sam Hayward | Nominated |
| AACTA Awards (3rd) | Best Sound | Yulia Akerholt | Nominated |
| AACTA Awards (3rd) | Best Production Design | Pete Baxter | Nominated |
| AACTA Awards (3rd) | Best Costume Design | Woranun Pueakpun | Nominated |
| AACTA Awards (3rd) | Best Costume Design | Sylvia Wilczynski | Nominated |
| 31st Ale Kino! Festival | Golden Poznan Goats for Best Children's Feature Movie | Kim Mordaunt | Won |
| 31st Ale Kino! Festival | Young Audience's Award for Best Movie | Kim Mordaunt | Won |
| ASE Award | Best Editing in a Feature Film | Nick Meyers | Won |
| FCCA Awards | Best Film | Sylvia Wilczynski | Won |
| FCCA Awards | Best Director | Kim Mordaunt | Nominated |
| FCCA Awards | Best Script | Kim Mordaunt | Nominated |
| FCCA Awards | Best Young Actor | Sitthiphon Disamoe | Won |
| FCCA Awards | Best Young Actor | Loungnam Kaosainam | Nominated |
| FCCA Awards | Best Editing | Nick Meyers | Nominated |
| FCCA Awards | Best Cinematography | Andrew Commis | Nominated |
| FCCA Awards | Best Music | Caitlin Yeo | Won |
| Tribeca Film Festival Audience Award | Best Narrative Feature | Kim Mordaunt | Won |
| Tribeca Film Festival Audience Award | Best Actor in a Narrative Feature Film | Sitthiphon Disamoe | Won |

== See also ==
- List of submissions to the 86th Academy Awards for Best Foreign Language Film
- List of Australian submissions for the Academy Award for Best Foreign Language Film
- Laotian Civil War
- CIA activities in Laos
- Bomb Harvest
- Blood Road
