= Rippy (film) =

- Directed by: Ryan Coonan
- Written by: Richard Barcaricchio; Ryan Coonan
- Starring: Michael Biehn; Tess Haubrich; Angie Miliken; Mungo McKay
- Release date: 18 October 2024
- Country: Australia
- Language: English

Rippy is a 2024 Ozploitation horror film directed and co-written by Ryan Coonan. Based on short film Waterborne.

== Plot ==
A young Australian female sheriff discovers that the local townspeople are being ripped to shreds by an undead killer kangaroo. Working with her eccentric Vietnam Vet uncle, she must battle the roo before it kills them all.

== Critical reception ==
Phil Hoad of The Guardian awarded Rippy 2 out of 5 possible stars and described the film as, "An Ozploitation outing to forget."

Bloody Disgusting said in its review, "Rippy never makes the leap from bad to good, but it’s not a complete loss. Coonan pays careful attention to setting and mood, and he brings out the natural beauty of the story’s rural setting."
