= Steve Toussaint =

British actor

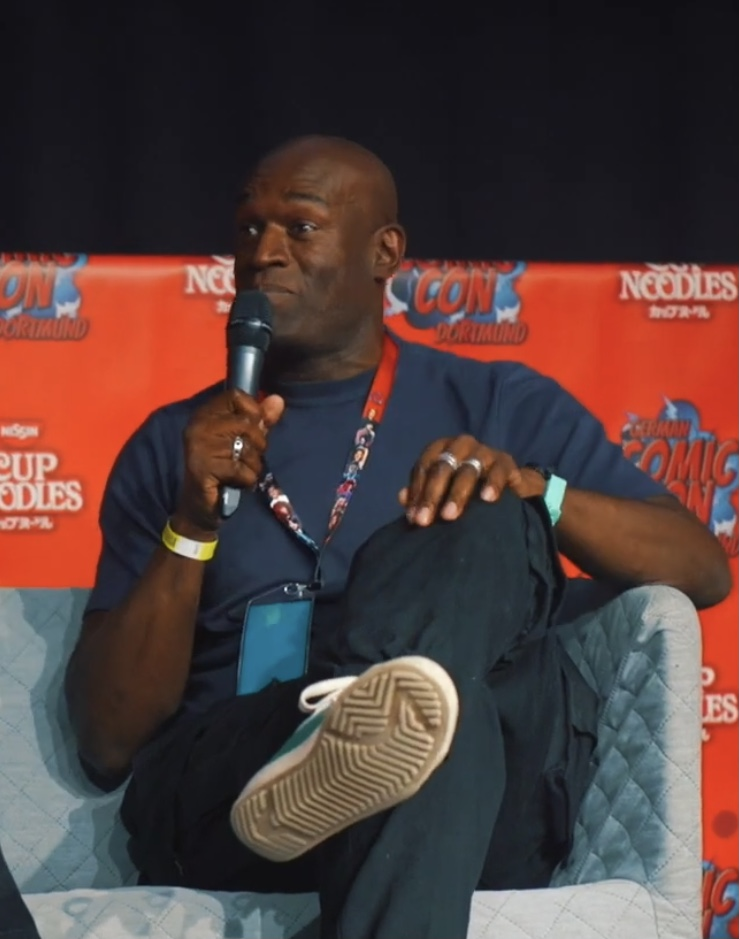
- Toussaint at the 2022 German Comic Con Dortmund
- Born: 22 March 1965 (age 61); Birmingham, England
- Education: University of Sussex (BA)
- Occupation: Actor
- Years active: 1994–present
- Website: stevetoussaint.com

Stephen Toussaint (born 22 March 1965) is a British actor and writer. He first gained prominence through his role in the ITV crime drama The Knock (1994–2000). Currently, he plays Lord Corlys Velaryon in the HBO fantasy series House of the Dragon.

His films include Shooting Dogs (2005) and Prince of Persia: The Sands of Time (2010). On television, he appeared in the second series of Line of Duty (2014), the ninth series of Lewis (2015), the Australian series Pine Gap (2018), and Small Axe: Red, White and Blue (2020).

== Early life ==
Toussaint was born in Birmingham to Bajan parents and grew up on an estate in the New Cross area of South London, where his father worked for the London Underground and his mother worked as a nurse. His first taste of acting came in a school nativity play as a Roman centurion in a suit of Armour made from cardboard. He studied politics at the University of Sussex. During his time there, he was scouted for a role in a play and joined the drama society. After graduating, he briefly worked in merchant banking and hospital administration before deciding to try acting again. He took evening drama classes.

Toussaint changed his surname to Toussaint because his birth name conflicted with a pre-existing member of his actors' union. He chose the name from Toussaint Louverture, the Haitian revolutionary leader (as at the time he had been reading about him in The Black Jacobins by C. L. R. James).

== Career ==
Toussaint's first professional role in acting, was as the Genie in the Lamp in Aladdin at the Churchill Theatre in 1990 in a cast that included John Inman, Paul Shane, Susan Maughan, Eli Woods and David Janson. His other extensive theatre career included performances in A Doll's House at the Young Vic, Macbeth and The Merchant of Venice for the Royal Shakespeare Company, Twelfth Night at the Nottingham Playhouse, and more.

Toussaint's big break on television was starring as Barrie Christie in all 37 episodes of the ITV crime drama The Knock from 1994 to 2000. He appeared in Waking the Dead in 2002, My Dad's the Prime Minister in 2004, and Mutant Chronicles in 2008.

In 2010, Toussaint starred in the Mike Newell-directed film Prince of Persia: The Sands of Time alongside Jake Gyllenhaal, Gemma Arterton and Ben Kingsley. Toussaint appeared as CS Ray Mallick in the second season of the BBC2 police drama series Line of Duty in 2014. In 2015 he starred in Lewis, In 2018 he starred in 6 episodes of Pine Gap.

In 2022, Toussaint began starring as Corlys Velaryon, the head of House Velaryon, in the HBO fantasy series House of the Dragon, a Game of Thrones spin-off. He then appeared in the BBC One series Rain Dogs as the Duke.

== Filmography ==
=== Film ===
Year	Title	Role	Notes
1995	I.D.	Shadwell Fan	
1995	Judge Dredd	Hunter Squad Leader	
1995	You'll Soon Get the Hang of It: The Technique of One to One Training	Camera Operator	Documentary short
2000	Circus	Black	
2001	Dog Eat Dog	Darcy	
2002	The Perfect Moment	News Anchor	Short Film
2003	The Order	New York Detective	
2005	Shooting Dogs	Roland	
2007	Flight of Fury	Col. Ratcher	
2007	Roadblock	Sgt Garret Young	Short Film
2008	Mutant Chronicles	Capt John McGuire	
2008	Broken Lines	Physio	
2010	Prince of Persia: The Sands of Time	Seso	
2012	A Doll's House	Dr. Rank	Recording
2014	Asylum	Powell	
2014	Darkness		Short Film
2015	Point Break	FBI Dept. Director #1	
2016	A Viable Candidate	Sylvan Bradshaw	Short Film Also credited as writer
2018	Forgive Me, Father	Father Matthew	Short Film
2019	Masters of Love	Dad	
2023	Gassed Up	Roy	Amazon Prime film
2026	A Blue Butterfly	Sentwali	Boudica Entertainment Feature Film Also credited as writer [8]

=== Television ===
Year	Title	Role	Notes
1994	The Memoirs of Sherlock Holmes	Steve Dixie	Episode: The Three Gables
1994–2000	The Knock	Barrie Christie	37 episodes
1994–2005	The Bill	Clive Isley / Mike Hurley / Nick Austin	11 episodes
1995	Backup	Ralf Johnson	Episode: "Toleration Zone"
1996	Crucial Tales	Robert	Episode: "Spiders and Flies"
1998	Macbeth	Lennox	Television Film
1998	Dangerfield	P.C. Lyle	Episode: "Harvest Time"
1999	Maisie Raine	Barry Wills	Episode: "The Witness"
1999	Jack of Hearts	Joe	5 episodes
1999	Doomwatch: Winter Angel	Luke	Television Film
1999	Casualty	Martin Devern	Episode: "Peace on Earth"
1999–2009	Holby City	Charles Harrison / Sean Horton / Martin Devern	4 episodes
2002	Waking the Dead	Charlie Bellows	2 episodes
2002–2010	Doctors	D.I. Mike Trent / Tom Dumasai / D.I. Mike Trent	16 episodes
2003	Murder in Mind	DC Chris Hewson	Episode: "Suicide"
2003	Murphy's Law	Sammy	Episode: "Kiss and Tell"
2003	Rosemary & Thyme	D.I. Scott	Episode: "Sweet Angelica"
2004	Family Affairs	Caleb Andrew	3 episodes
2004	England Expects	Pete	Television Film
2004	My Dad's the Prime Minister	Transport Secretary	7 episodes
2005	Broken News	Adam Lockwood - PVS	6 episodes
2007	Them	Uriah Selleck	Television Film
2007	Wild Caribbean	Himself (narrator)	Documentary series
2007–2008	CSI: Miami	Judge Hugo Kemp	3 episodes
2007–2014	Silent Witness	Richard Parkwood / Pastor Funmi Lambo	4 episodes
2009	New Tricks	Grant Lindon	Episode: "The Last Laugh"
2010	Skins	Father Babajide	Episode: "Thomas"
2010	Spooks	Felix Osuba	Season 9 Episode 2
2014	Line of Duty	CS Ray Mallick	3 episodes
2014	Scott & Bailey	DSI Will Pemberton	4 episodes
2015	Banana	Pete Monroe	1 episode
2015	DCI Banks	Michael Osgood	2 episodes
2015	A.D. The Bible Continues	Julius	1 episode
2015	Tut	King Tushratta	3 episodes
2015	Lewis	CS Joseph Moody / Ch. Supt. Moody / Ch. Supt. Joe Moody	6 episodes
2016	Midsomer Murders	Victor Campbell	Episode: "The Incident at Cooper Hill"
2016	Grantchester	Dicky Evans	1 episode
2016	Berlin Station	Benjamin Taylor	3 episodes
2017	Fortitude	Lamont Bailey	2 episodes
2017	Upstart Crow	Otello	Episode: "The Green-Eyed Monster"
2018	Death in Paradise	Steadman King	Episode: "The Healer"
2018	Killed by My Debt	Bentley Duncan	
2018	Our Girl	Roger Mendez	2 episodes
2018	Pine Gap	Ethan James	6 episodes
2019	Deep Water	Adam	3 episodes
2020	Doctor Who	Feekat	Episode: "Ascension of the Cybermen"
2020	In the Long Run	Charles Lander / Charles Quigley	3 episodes
2020	Small Axe	Kenneth Logan	Episode: "Red, White and Blue"
2021	It's a Sin	Alan Baxter	2 episodes
2021	Before We Die	Kane	3 episodes
2022–present	House of the Dragon	Corlys Velaryon	Main Role; 21 episodes
2023	Rain Dogs	The Duke	
2025	Eyes of Wakanda	Kuda (voice)	Épisode: "The Last Panther"

=== Video games ===
Year	Title	Role	Notes
2018	Jurassic World Evolution	George Lambert	voice
2018	World of Warcraft: Battle for Azeroth		voice
2021	Jurassic World Evolution 2	George Lambert	voice
2022	Battlefield 2042	Charlie Crawford	Season 2
2025	Jurassic World Evolution 3	George Lambert	voice

== Stage ==
Year	Title	Role	Notes
1996	The No Boys Cricket Club	Michael	Theatre Royal Stratford East
2000–2001	The Servant to Two Masters	Florindo	Royal Shakespeare Company tour
2002	20,000 Leagues Under the Sea	Ned	Theatre Royal Stratford East
2003	Urban Afro-Saxons	Dennis	Talawa Theatre Company, Theatre Royal Stratford East
2004	Fix Up	Kwesi	Cottesloe at the National Theatre, London
2008	Hapgood	The American	Birmingham Repertory Theatre, Birmingham; West Yorkshire Playhouse, Leeds
2010	Ruined	Commander Osembenga	Almeida Theatre, London
2010	Twelfth Night	Orsino	Nottingham Playhouse, Nottingham
2011	The Merchant of Venice	Salerio	Royal Shakespeare Theatre, Stratford-upon-Avon
2011	Macbeth	Banquo	Royal Shakespeare Theatre, Stratford-upon-Avon
2011–2012	The Riots	Stafford Scott	Tricycle Theatre / Bernie Grant Arts Centre, London
2012–2014	A Doll's House	Dr. Rank	Young Vic / Duke of York's Theatre, London; BAM Harvey Theater, New York
2016	Father Comes Home From the Wars (Parts 1, 2, & 3)	Hero	Royal Court Theatre, London
