= The Uninvited (TV series) =

- Episode 1 Title Card
- Created by: Leslie Grantham
- Written by: Peter Bowker
- Directed by: Norman Stone
- Starring: Douglas Hodge; Leslie Grantham; Lia Williams; Sylvestra Le Touzel; David Allister; Ian Brimble; Caroline Lee-Johnson; Gillian Barge; Eamon Boland
- Composer: Martin Kiszko
- Country of origin: United Kingdom
- Original language: English
- No. of series: 1
- No. of episodes: 4

Production
- Executive producers: Archie Tait; Leslie Grantham
- Producer: Ruth Boswell
- Cinematography: Doug Hallows
- Editor: Colin Goudie
- Running time: 50 minutes
- Production companies: Zenith Entertainment; Anglia Television

Original release
- Network: ITV
- Release: 25 September – 16 October 1997

The Uninvited is a British television science fiction mystery thriller mini-series, created by Leslie Grantham and written by Peter Bowker, first broadcast on ITV between 25 September and 16 October 1997. The series was co-produced by Zenith Entertainment and Anglia Television.

== Production ==
The series was filmed in and around Norwich, with scenes filmed at the University of East Anglia, Norwich Magistrate's Court and the offices of the Eastern Daily Press in Norwich city centre. The series was novelised by Paul Cornell and published by Virgin Books. (ISBN 0-7535-0220-8). Cornell, a huge fan of the BBC science fiction television series Doctor Who (who at that point had written several licensed novels based on the programme), cheekily included a cameo appearance at the end from Doctor Who character Brigadier Lethbridge-Stewart, although the character is unnamed in the book.

A soundtrack album accompanying the series, with music composed by Martin Kiszko, was released on 6 October 1997 via Ocean Deep Records. The complete series was first released on VHS on 26 January 2000, followed by a DVD release on 28 July 2003. The DVD combines the four fifty-minute episodes into two feature-length episodes of 100 minutes each.

== Plot ==
Steve Blake (Douglas Hodge), a photographer and former journalist, witnesses the head of British Nuclear Power, James Wilson (David Allister) killed in a horrific car crash. However, the next day, Wilson turns up alive and well. Blake discovers a connection to the village of Sweethope, which collapsed into the sea following a chemical explosion. The population of the village was reportedly saved by two police officers, John Ferguson (Ian Brimble) and Philip Gates (Leslie Grantham). Blake is suspicious when he discovers a prominent number of the survivors have all gone on to obtain positions of power within the British establishment.

== Cast ==
- Douglas Hodge as Steve Blake
- Leslie Grantham as Chief Supt. Philip Gates
- Lia Williams as Melissa Gates
- Sylvestra Le Touzel as Joanna Ball
- David Allister as James Wilson
- Ian Brimble as Supt. John Ferguson
- Caroline Lee-Johnson as Sarah Armstrong
- Gillian Barge as Mary Madigan
- Eamon Boland as Patrick Leonard
- Natasha Rout as Fiona Leonard
- Matt Patresi as David Hallworth
- Simon Cook as Mark Knowles
- Christopher Scoular as Jon Davidson
- Oliver Ford Davies as Gerald Ryle
- Ben George as David Leonard
- Jean Anderson as Elizabeth Madigan
- Michael Cochrane as Oliver James
- Denzil Kilvington as Gary Cartwright
- Brian Hewlett as John Beck

== Episodes ==
No. overall	No. in series	Title	Directed by	Written by	Original release date
1	1	"Chapter One"	Norman Stone	Peter Bowker	25 September 1997
Photographer Steve Blake witnesses a fatal car crash but is surprised to find the victim alive and well the next day. Investigating further, he finds several similar cases, and uncovers the village of Sweethorpe, which fell into the sea five years earlier, with no loss of life.
2	2	"Chapter Two"	Norman Stone	Peter Bowker	2 October 1997
Blake, investigating the highly successful careers of the Sweethorpe survivors, gets a job at a software plant owned by another Sweethope survivor but is soon uncovered. Melissa Gates falls foul of the local M.P.
3	3	"Chapter Three"	Norman Stone	Peter Bowker	9 October 1997
Melissa survives the car crash, but Blake worries that she might have been renewed like the Sweethorpe victims. They decide to reveal their theory of alien invasion on national television.
4	4	"Chapter Four"	Norman Stone	Peter Bowker	16 October 1997
Blake is denounced as a terrorist responsible for the explosion at Sizewell power station, and goes on the run with Melissa.
