= Shakara Ledard =

Bahamian model and actress

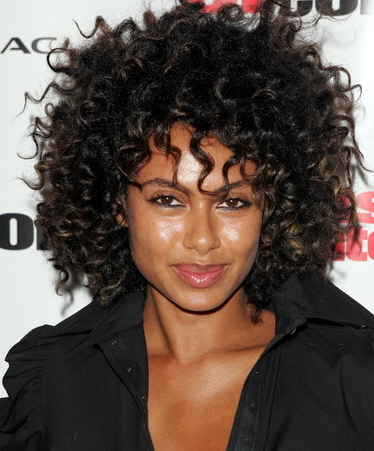
- Ledard in 2009
- Born: February 21, 1979 (age 47); Nassau, Bahamas
- Modeling information
- Height: 1.75 m (5 ft 9 in)
- Hair color: Brown
- Eye color: Brown

Shakara Ledard (born February 21, 1979) is a Bahamian-born model and actress based in New York City.

== Biography ==
Ledard was born in Nassau, The Bahamas on February 21, 1979, to Dennis Ledard, a businessman from Normandy, France, and Maddie, who is Bahamian. Dennis owned several upscale clothing boutiques in The Bahamas. She has two brothers, Lorenzo and Yannick, and a half brother, Philippe. She moved to America when she was a teenager and graduated with an associate's degree and a 3.8 GPA.

Ledard has posed for the Sports Illustrated swimsuit issue and for Maxim. Ledard has been featured in music videos for Justin Timberlake, Usher, and Babyface. She has also appeared in the movies After the Sunset, The Defender, Prey for Rock and Roll and Full Clip.

Ledard resides in New York City. She was married to male model Ralph Jacob, but the marriage ended in divorce. She supports Deejay Ra's "Hip-Hop Literacy" campaign.
