= Enzo Squillino Jr. =

British actor (born 1966)

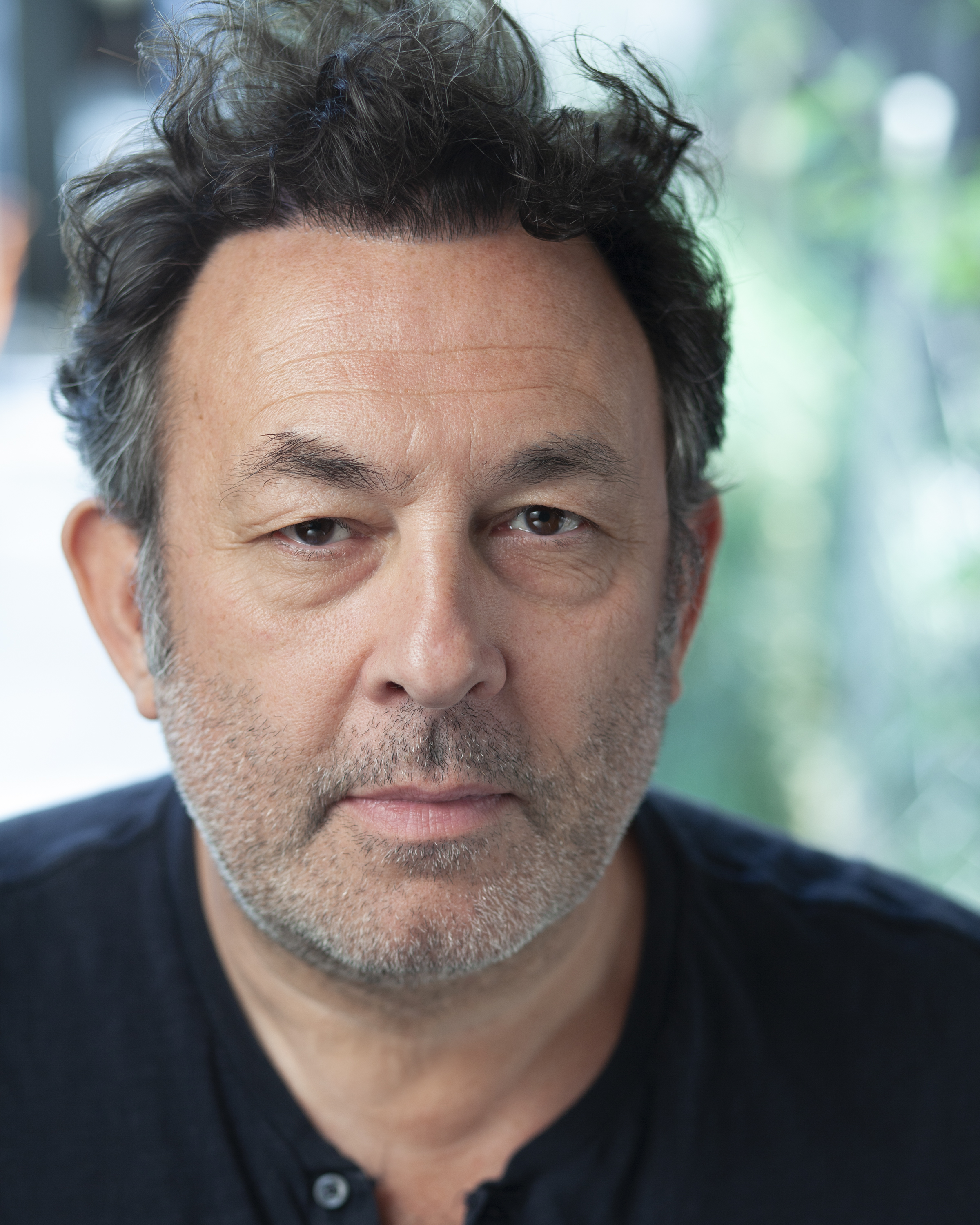
- Squillino Jr. in 2020
- Born: Sheffield, West Riding of Yorkshire, England
- Occupation: Actor
- Years active: 1988–present
- Spouse: Jaimie Allison (m. 2006)
- Children: 2

Enzo Squillino Jr. is a British actor and photographer.

== Life and career ==
Enzo Squillino Jnr was born in Sheffield, West Riding of Yorkshire, England and was trained at the Mountview Theatre Academy in London. He portrayed the role of Ritchie Valens in the West End musical Buddy – The Buddy Holly Story. Later, he established a reputation on-screen as a dramatic and comic actor as cockney wide boy George Andreotti in the television drama series The Knock. In March 2021, he appeared in an episode of the BBC soap opera Doctors as Tony Loreto.

== Performances ==
=== Television ===
- EastEnders
- Carnival Row
- Henry VIII
- Mister Winner
- Carnival Row II
- Delicious
- Holby City
- Undercover
- The Collection
- Doctors
- Above Suspicion
- Zen
- The Game
- The Collection
- Law & Order
- The Bill
- EastEnders
- Judas
- Jack of Hearts
- The Knock
- Birds of a Feather
- Coasting
- The Old Boy Network
- The Hutton Inquiry
- Nothing Like a Royal Show
- London's Burning
- The Labours of Erica
- Saturday Matters
- That's English

=== Films ===
- Clayface
- Jurassic World Dominion
- The Hitman's Wife's Bodyguard
- Paddington 2
- Much Ado About Nothing
- Nine
- Mamma Mia!
- Incendiary
- Superstition
- Diana
- Brothers of Italy

=== Music videos ===
- I Don't Wanna Live Forever

=== Theatre ===
- A View From The Bridge
- Saturday Night Fever
- Much Ado About Nothing
- Of Mice and Men
- The Buddy Holly Story

=== Video games ===
- Mutant Year Zero: Road to Eden
- Mutant Year Zero: Seed of Evil
- Baldur’s Gate
