= Bleeding Steel =

2017 film by Leo Zhang

- US theatrical release poster
- Traditional Chinese: 機器之血
- Simplified Chinese: 机器之血
- Hanyu Pinyin: Jī qì zhī xuè
- Directed by: Leo Zhang
- Screenplay by: Leo Zhang; Erica Xia-Hou; Siwei Cui
- Produced by: Jackie Chan
- Starring: Jackie Chan; Show Lo; Erica Xia-Hou; Ouyang Nana; Callan Mulvey; Tess Haubrich
- Cinematography: Tony Cheung; Jack Jian
- Edited by: Kwong Chi-leung; Leo Zhang
- Music by: Peng Fei
- Production companies: Heyi Pictures; Village Roadshow Pictures
- Distributed by: Lionsgate Pictures; United Entertainment Partners
- Release dates: 22 December 2017 (China); 6 July 2018 (United States)
- Running time: 110 minutes
- Country: China
- Languages: Mandarin; English
- Budget: $65 million
- Box office: $48.8 million

Bleeding Steel is a 2017 Chinese science fiction cyberpunk action film directed and written by Leo Zhang and starring Jackie Chan.

Bleeding Steel was released in China on 22 December 2017. In the US, Lionsgate Premiere released the film in theaters and on VOD on 6 July 2018. The film received mixed reviews and it grossed US$48.8 million and was a box office bomb.

== Plot ==
While racing to the hospital to see his daughter Xixi, who has leukemia and whose condition has become critical, Hong Kong Special Agent Lin Dong is informed by his colleague Xiao Su that Dr. James, an important witness, is in danger. Lin stops right outside the hospital, hesitates, and drives off to meet up with Xiao Su and their unit.

Before the unit arrives, Dr. James injects himself with a chemical substance and brings along a mechanical heart with him. As the unit escorts him away, they are ambushed by a squad of men in exotic black armor and high-tech weaponry led by a monstrous-looking man named Andre, who kills off most of the unit and severely injures Lin Dong and Xiao Su. Before Andre can capture Dr. James, Lin Dong pins him against an oil tank using his car. When Andre survives the car's impact, Lin shoots the oil tank, causing a huge explosion. As he lies gravely injured, Lin receives a phone call that Dr. James answers: Xixi has died at the hospital. However both Lin Dong and Andre are later shown to have survived, although Andre's injuries have him turned into a cyborg.

13 years later in Sydney, Australia, author Rick Rogers has recently released a book titled Bleeding Steel about a US Marine implanted with a mechanical heart. A young man named Li Sen, disguised as a female prostitute, pays a visit to Rogers at his hotel, drugs him, and downloads information about the book from his computer. A black-clad woman storms the building and tortures Rogers to reveal the source of his inspiration for the book. While Li Sen hides in the suite's bathtub, the Woman in Black is attacked by Lin Dong, who has also come to find out the same answer. Rogers is killed by the Woman in Black, and the arrival of the police forces everyone to retreat.

The Woman in Black returns to a high-tech airship that serves as Andre's headquarters and briefs him about the failed operation. He identifies Lin Dong and Li Sen from CCTV footage and sends the Woman after the latter, but Li Sen has already fled. Acting upon the data he had taken from Rogers, Li Sen tracks down Nancy, a young woman who is plagued by nightmares about a laboratory where strange experiments were conducted. In order to deal with them, she has been visiting a spiritualist, who in turn told Rogers about the dreams. She is tracked down by the Woman in Black, but is rescued and taken to safety by Lin Dong and Li Sen's combined efforts.

Nancy is revealed to be Xixi, resurrected by Dr. James, who had been working on the genetic enhancement of human beings, and specifically regeneration, to create immortal bioroid soldiers. James fitted Xixi with the mechanical heart and infused her with the chemical substance he had injected himself with, a biogenetic blood substitute, which gave her regenerative abilities. However, Xixi's temporary death had left her with amnesia, and she was put into an orphanage for her own safety, while Lin Dong and his old unit secretly watched over her. Her nightmares stem from James' memories which imprinted themselves on the blood substitute he had injected himself with, and his blood was afterwards used in her resurrection. Andre, a former special forces soldier, was another test subject who infiltrated the project in the service of a prominent Korean arms dealer who wanted to steal James' research and use it for profit. The procedure failed on Andre, leaving his cells to slowly consume him from within, and in revenge he killed the arms dealer and his family. James himself died soon after his operation on Xixi, making her the sole successful subject of his achievements.

Lin Dong takes Xixi and Li Sen to his house, where he locks the young man in his advanced security vault and pays a visit to the spiritualist, who he finds murdered. Xixi runs away to take a flight back to James' abandoned home, where she recovers both her old memories of her father and a bank vault key hidden by James. Following her, Lin Dong reunites with Xiao Su, but before he can reach Xixi, she is kidnapped by the Woman in Black and is brought to Andre's airship and imprisoned in his laboratory. Rejoined by Li Sen, who had managed to free himself, they proceed to the bank vault, where the Woman in Black has been captured by Xiao Su while trying to retrieve the vault's contents: a video camera. Examining the contents of the camera's tape, which details Andre's botched bioroid conversion, Lin and Xiao Su surmise that Andre is dying and he needs Xixi's blood to bestow the regenerative effect upon himself to survive.

Onboard Andre's airship, Andre proceeds to extract Xixi's blood and inject it into himself to restore his body. Lin Dong, Xiao Su, and Li Sen infiltrate the craft and try to break Xixi out but are thwarted by an impenetrable security screen. The trio battle Andre's henchmen, which forces him to join the fight before the transfusion is complete, which gives Xixi sufficient time to fully regenerate and come to her father's aid. Lin and the others cast Andre into the airship's reactor core, which overloads and destroys the lab, but Li Sen is caught in an explosion. Xiao Su and Xixi manage to escape the airship by parachute, but Lin Dong is attacked by Andre before he can join them. Because Andre had accidentally injected Lin Dong with Xixi's enhanced blood during their earlier encounter, Lin Dong gains enough strength to fight him off and rips Andre's heart out of his chest. Without a parachute, Lin jumps off the airship before a final explosion destroys the craft, killing Andre, but Xiao Su and Xixi catch him using their own chute's canopy.

In the aftermath, as Lin Dong, Xixi and Xiao enjoy time together, Lin learns from his colleague that Li Sen was the son of the arms dealer who had sought James' research, and for years he had planned to take revenge on Andre for the murder of his family. Lin also realizes that Li had been a friend of Nancy/Xixi at the orphanage and had acted out of genuine affection for her. In Norway, Li Sen is shown to have survived, offering the tape with James' research to an interested buyer where he then refuses the buyer's offer.

== Cast ==
- Jackie Chan as Lin Dong
- Ouyang Nana as Nancy/Xixi
- Show Lo as Li Sen
- Erica Xia-Hou as Xiao Su (Susan)
- Callan Mulvey as Andre
- Tess Haubrich as Woman in Black
- Kym Gyngell as Dr James
- Damien Garvey as Rick Rogers
- Gillian Jones as Witch
- Cosentino as himself

== Production ==
Village Roadshow Pictures Asia and Heyi Pictures co-produced and co-financed the sci-fi thriller film, Bleeding Steel, starring Jackie Chan, directed by Leo Zhang from his own script. Other cast included Tess Haubrich, Callan Mulvey, Nana Ou-Yang, Erica Xia-Hou, and Show Lo.

Principal photography on the film began on 20 July 2016, in Sydney, Australia. Filming also took place in Taipei and Beijing, and wrapped up in September 2016.

== Release ==
Bleeding Steel was first released in Australia by Perfect Village Entertainment on 15 December 2017 before being released in China by United Entertainment Partners (UEP) a week later, on 22 December. The film was released in the Philippines by Viva International Pictures and MVP Entertainment on 21 February 2018. In the United States, the film was first released by UEP with English subtitles in December 2017. It was later released with an English dub by Lionsgate Premiere on 6 July 2018 in both theaters and video on demand.

Bleeding Steel, though not officially part of the Police Story series, was released under the title ポリス・ストーリー REBORN (lit. Police Story Reborn) in Japan, and used an updated version of the Police Story title song sung by Jackie Chan in the end credits. Unlike the original, which was sung in Cantonese, this version is sung in Mandarin Chinese.

== Reception ==
On Rotten Tomatoes, the film has an approval rating of 22% based on 18 reviews, with an average rating of 3.6/10. The South China Morning Post compared Bleeding Steel to previous films starring Jackie Chan, stating "with this one he hits a new low in terms of the nonsensical garbage he is willing to put his name to". The review specifically noted the lack of "action, humour or logic", finding the film "packed with risible English dialogue and even worse performances, the film feels like a lazy, contemptuous cash grab from start to finish". Variety declared the film a "corny cyberpunk pastiche" that would appeal "exclusively to kids".
