= Caroline Lee-Johnson =

British actress

- Born: United Kingdom
- Occupation: Actress

Caroline Lee-Johnson is a British actress. She is best known for her starring roles in Chef! as Janice Blackstock and The Knock as Diane Ralston. Her work has been primarily in television, but she has also had roles in films, including The Defender. Lee-Johnson trained at the Guildhall School of Music and Drama, London.

== Career performances ==
=== Selected TV programmes ===
Year	TV Program	Role	Notes
1988	Campaign	Dee Vincent	6 episodes
1993	Chef!	Janice Blackstock	Series 1–3
1994	The Knock	Diane Ralston	37 episodes
1997	The Uninvited	Sarah Armstrong	3 episodes
2002	Holby City	Patsy Brassvine	9 episodes
2003	Silent Witness	Alice Pettman	2 episodes
2004	Waking the Dead	Assistant Commissioner Dyson	2 episodes
2007	The Whistleblowers	Barbara Waters	1 episode
2015	Humans	Brothel Madam	3 episodes
2015	From Darkness	Superintendent Lola Keir	4 episodes
2021	Vera	Darlene Houghton	1 episode
2021	Midsomer Murders	Jeanie Saint-Stephens	1 episode
2022	Ridley	Gill Moreland	1 episode
2024	Rebus	Gill Templer	6 episodes

== Selected filmography ==
Year	Film	Role	Notes
1993	Monday’s Girls	Lee-Johnson narrates	Educational documentary explores a Nigerian female initiation ceremony from perspective of two young Waikiriki women from the Niger delta. Ngozi Onwurah, director.
1991	Who Needs a Heart	Naomi	Documentary inspired by 1960s black revolutionary leader Michael X
1997	The Saint	Private Hotel Receptionist	
2004	The Defender	Mrs. Roberta Jones, National Security Agency head	British-German action film
2005	The Funny Blokes of British Comedy	Self	Documentary

=== Selected theatre ===
Year	Play	Role	Theatre	Notes
1991	Macbeth	Lady Macbeth	Performed at the Haworth Shakespeare Festival, Committed Artists Theatre Company, New York International Festival of the Arts	The play was a modern-day adaptation based in South Africa. UK actor Patrick Miller recalled, "Caroline Lee Johnson was stunning as Lady M. She used to get a standing ovation after her first speech."
1990	Joe Turner's Come and Gone	Molly Cunningham	Tricycle Theatre, London	UK premiere
1989	Indigo	Prince's bride-to-be	Almeida Theatre, London	Lee-Johnson performs with Hakeem Kae-Kazim, Dougray Scott and Brian Protheroe. Directed by Keith Boak.
1988	The Changeling	Joanna's maid	National Theatre London	Art critic Gabriele Annan wrote of the performance, "[t]he sexiest and best-spoken performance comes from Caroline Lee Johnson as Joanna's black maid...".
1986	Romeo and Juliet	Lady	Royal Shakespeare Company	
1986	The Winter's Tale	Played Dorcas, Lady	Royal Shakespeare Company	
