= The Defender (2004 film) =

- Promotional release poster
- Directed by: Dolph Lundgren
- Written by: Douglas W. Miller
- Produced by: Philippe Martinez, Claudine Strasser, Douglas W. Miller
- Starring: Dolph Lundgren; Jerry Springer; Shakara Ledard; Thomas Lockyer; Caroline Lee Johnson
- Cinematography: Maxime Alexandre
- Edited by: Dedan Ouziel; Julian Rodd
- Music by: Adam Nordén
- Distributed by: Bauer Martinez Studios
- Release dates: December 20, 2004 (Greece); October 18, 2005 (United States)
- Running time: 90 minutes
- Countries: United Kingdom; Germany
- Language: English
- Budget: $6 million

The Defender is a 2004 British-German action film starring and directed by Dolph Lundgren in his directorial debut. The film also co-stars Jerry Springer, Shakara Ledard, Thomas Lockyer and Caroline Lee Johnson. The film was released on direct-to-video in the United States on October 18, 2005.

Dolph Lundgren plays Lance Rockford, who must set aside his values and patriotism to protect the life of the world's greatest terrorist so that he does not become a martyr for his cause.

== Plot ==
The global war on terror rages on. The United States will not give an inch against terrorists, especially Mohamed Jamar, who is considered to be the worst of them all. Jamar has been missing for months, but his network continues its functions.

The President stands firm before the world, but behind the scenes, his teams are working to find the final solution. Jamar represents a paradox: he can never be killed, because if he was found dead, he would become an instant martyr.

If caught he must be tried. If he is found guilty he would become a martyr and further inspiration to acts of terror. If acquitted, the policies of the entire western world would be destroyed. So he must remain invisible.

Roberta Jones, the head of the National Security Agency, is working to ensure he remains invisible, forever. Under the guise of attending an Eastern European conference on Terror in Romania, she attends a secret meeting with Jamar at a secluded hotel outside Bucharest.

No one knows about this meeting, and her goal is to buy his invisibility. Her only companions are her security team of six, headed by her personal bodyguard, Lance Rockford. They are the best of the best, former military special forces personnel capable of anything.

When they arrive at the hotel for the secret meeting, they are ambushed. No one is supposed to know about the meeting, but someone wants it stopped. They have to fight for their lives against an unknown attacker.

Lance, a man of highest integrity with an impressive record of service for his country, is forced into a situation which challenges his very beliefs. Throughout the crisis, it is revealed that Jamar and his loyal bodyguard were actually undercover agents from the Central Intelligence Agency and MI5 who have uncovered evidence against high-ranking military officials involved in a conspiracy to topple the President to continue war profiteering, and Rockford's trusted agent, Kaye was the mole involved in the conspiracy. With all of the members of the team, as well as the undercover agents dead, a wounded Lance kills Kaye with a thrown combat knife. The conspiracy is toppled by the Federal Bureau of Investigation as well as military police, while Lance voluntarily leaves his bodyguard duties.

== Cast ==
- Dolph Lundgren as Lance Rockford
- Jerry Springer as President of the United States
- Shakara Ledard as Kaye
- Thomas Lockyer as Stevenson
- Caroline Lee Johnson as Mrs. Jones
- Gerald Kyd as Morgan
- Ian Porter as Newell
- Howard Antony as Parker
- Geoffrey Burton as Jamal
- Iddo Goldberg as Scripts
- James Chalke as Lee
- Leigh Zimmerman as Reporter
- Steven Elder as Tech #1
- Radu Florescu as Aide
- Ovidiu Niculescu as Officer

== Production ==
=== Filming ===
The film is set and filmed in Bucharest, Romania and Washington, D.C., on January 5 and February 4, 2004.
