= Tess Haubrich =

Australian actress and model

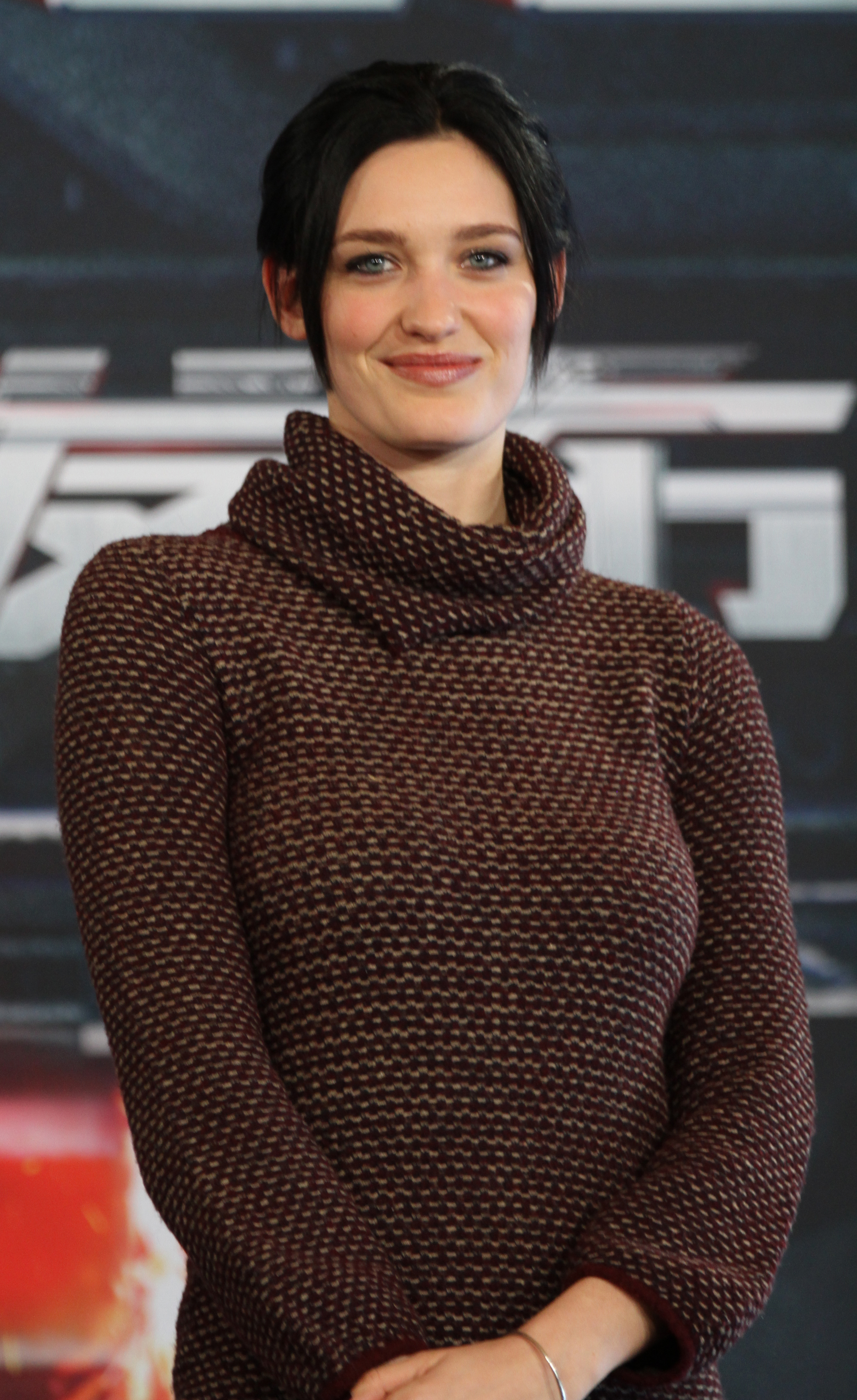
- Tess Haubrich in July 2016
- Born: 1 April 1990 (age 36); Sydney, New South Wales, Australia
- Education: Pittwater High School; SCECGS Redlands
- Alma mater: Actors Centre Australia
- Occupations: Actress; model
- Years active: 2009–present
- Height: 1.80 m (5 ft 11 in)

Tess Haubrich is an Australian actress and model who most recently played Heather in the 2022 Netflix sci-fi film Spiderhead.

== Early life and education ==
Haubrich was born on 1 April 1990 in Sydney, New South Wales. She was educated at Pittwater High School and SCECGS Redlands.

Haubrich spent her late teens as a fashion model in Australia, Hong Kong, France and Germany. She trained for two years at the Actors Centre Australia, a private drama school in Sydney, where she trained in theatre.

== Career ==
In 2009, she appeared in two episodes of the soap opera Home and Away as Catie Merrin. She returned to the series as a different character, Shandi Palmer, in 2014.

Haubrich has appeared in a number of major international productions filmed in Australia, including minor roles in The Wolverine (2013) and Infini (2015); as Private Sarah Rosenthal in Alien: Covenant, and as Woman in Black in the Jackie Chan film Bleeding Steel, both in 2017.

In late 2017, she had a leading role in the second season of Wolf Creek. In 2018, she played a key character in the Australian spy drama series Pine Gap.

In 2023, Haubrich was announced as part of the extended cast of Last King of the Cross, and would return for the second season in 2024.

== Filmography ==
=== Film ===
Key
†	Denotes works that have not yet been released

Year	Title	Role	Notes
2009	Vinyl	Shayla	Short
2009	Drowning	Phaedra	Short
2010	Some Static Started	Pretty Girl	Short
2013	The Wolverine	Cashier	
2013	Like Breathing	Bel	Short
2014	Blood Pulls a Gun	The Mysterious Woman	Short
2015	Infini	Lisa Carmichael	
2015	Foal	Aurora	Short
2016	A Thousand Words	Claudia	Short
2017	Alien: Covenant	Sarah Rosenthal	
2017	Bleeding Steel	Woman in Black	
2018	Nekrotronic	Torquel	
2018	I F*cked a Mermaid and No One Believes Me	Rose	Short
2022	Spiderhead	Heather	
2024	Rippy	Maddie	

=== Television ===
Year	Title	Role	Notes	Ref
2009	Home and Away	Catie Merrin	Episodes: "1.4988", "1.4992"	
2011	Slide	Jessica	Episode: "1.8"	
2014	Jack Irish: Dead Point	Sienna	TV film	
2014	Home and Away	Shandi Ayres	Recurring role	
2017	Wolf Creek	Rebecca Michaels	Main role (series 2)	
2018	Pine Gap	Jasmina Delic	TV miniseries	
2019	Bad Mothers	Sarah	Main Role	
2019	Treadstone	Samantha	Recurring role	
2022	After the Verdict	Heidi Lang	Main Role	
2023–present	Last King of the Cross	Detective Liz Doyle	TV series	
2024	Friends Like Her	Tess	6 episodes	
2026	Gnomes	Gnome Queen	TV series	
