= The Knock =

British television crime drama

- (L to R: The show's main cast in Series Two – Marston Bloom, Enzo Squillino Jr., Steve Toussaint, Caroline Lee Johnson, Malcolm Storry, Alex Kingston, Andrew Dunn and Tracey Whitwell)
- Genre: Crime drama
- Created by: Anita Bronson
- Written by: Anita Bronson; Geoffrey Case; Ian Kennedy Martin; Steve Trafford; Stephen Leather
- Directed by: Various
- Starring: Caroline Lee-Johnson; Steve Toussaint; Enzo Squillino, Jr. Malcolm Storry; Marston Bloom; Andrew Dunn; Mark Lewis Jones; Peter O'Brien; Alex Kingston; Tracey Whitwell; Daniel O'Grady; Daniel Brown; Sarah Malin; Jonathan Kerrigan; Michelle Morris; Zig Byfield
- Ending theme: "The Knock"
- Composers: Brian Bennett; Warren Bennett
- Country of origin: United Kingdom
- Original language: English
- No. of series: 5
- No. of episodes: 37

Production
- Executive producer: Paul Knight
- Producer: Phillip Leach
- Production location: United Kingdom
- Editor: Nigel Parkes
- Running time: 75 minutes (w/advertisements) (Series 1-4); 105 minutes (w/advertisements) (Series 5)
- Production company: Bronson/Knight Productions for LWT

Original release
- Network: ITV
- Release: 10 April 1994 – 11 November 2000

The Knock is a British television crime drama, created by Anita Bronson and broadcast on ITV, which portrayed the activities of customs officers from the London City & South Collection Investigation Unit of HM Customs and Excise. The series derived its name from the distinctive "Knock knock knock" command used over the radio to synchronise a raid.

Five series were broadcast from 10 April 1994, until 11 November 2000. 37 episodes were made. The series had a rotating cast, with only a small number of cast members appearing throughout the series' run. The only three cast members to appear in every series were Caroline Lee-Johnson, Trevor Byfield and Steve Toussaint. The series also adopted a number of different formats: while the early series interspersed various storylines and had running plots across the series, later series adopted a multi-part format resulting in two or three cases per series. The final series adopted a stand-alone week by-week format.

The series was axed in 2001 following poor viewing figures for the final series. This was blamed on the loss of several main cast members, a change in the format and the overall look of the series which changed dramatically following an overhaul by ITV executives in 1999.

== Cast ==
=== Main cast ===
Character	Series				
Character	Series 1	Series 2	Series 3	Series 4	Series 5
Bill Adams Head of City and South	Malcolm Storry	Malcolm Storry	Malcolm Storry		
David Ancrom Head of City and South				Mark Lewis Jones	
Glen Vaughan Head of Indigo					Peter O'Brien
Diane Ralston Head of Airports	Caroline Lee-Johnson	Caroline Lee-Johnson	Caroline Lee-Johnson	Caroline Lee-Johnson	Caroline Lee-Johnson
Barry Christie Detective, City and South	Steve Toussaint	Steve Toussaint	Steve Toussaint	Steve Toussaint	Steve Toussaint
Arnie Reinhardt Detective, City and South	Marston Bloom	Marston Bloom	Marston Bloom		
George Andreotti Detective, City and South	Enzo Squillino, Jr.	Enzo Squillino, Jr.	Enzo Squillino, Jr.	Enzo Squillino, Jr.	
Kevin Butcher Detective, Airports	Andrew Dunn	Andrew Dunn	Andrew Dunn	Andrew Dunn	
Gerry Birch Detective, City and South	David Morrissey				
Eddie Barton Detective, Airports	Jack Ellis				
Nicki Lucas Detective, City and South	Suzan Crowley				
Jo Chadwick Detective, City and South	Tracey Whitwell	Tracey Whitwell			
Katherine Roberts Detective, City and South		Alex Kingston			
Jake Munroe Detective, City and South		Daniel O'Grady	Daniel O'Grady		
Alex Murray Detective, City and South			Daniel Brown	Daniel Brown	Daniel Brown
Lynn Hickson Detective, City and South			Sarah Malin	Sarah Malin	
Rob Maguire Technology Expert, Indigo					Jonathan Kerrigan (Episodes 1 & 2)
Jess Howarth Surveillance Expert, Indigo					Michelle Morris
Allison Smith Administrator, Airports			Claire Price	Claire Price	
Jim Scudamore Chief of Customs	Trevor Byfield	Trevor Byfield	Trevor Byfield	Trevor Byfield	Trevor Byfield

=== Guest cast ===
- Anthony Valentine as George Webster (Series 1–2)
- Ian Burfield as Tommy Maddern (Series 1–2)
- Oliver Tobias as Allan De Montfort (Series 2)
- Alan Gear as Swedish Sea Captain (Series 2–3)
- John Vine as Jeffrey Faulds (Series 2)
- Lenny McLean as Eddie Davies (Series 2–3)
- Colin Baker as Desmond Dewhurst (Series 3)
- Dennis Waterman as John Danson (Series 3)
- Fiona Dolman as Anna Ransley (Series 3)
- Michael Brandon as Greg Taylor (Series 4)
- Bryan Marshall as Frankie Johnson (Series 4)
- Cherie Lunghi as Toni Maxwell (Series 4)
- Rik Mayall as Simon Reid (Series 5)
- Steve John Shepherd as Rick Foster (Series 5)
- Jay Simon as Jan Lund (Series 5)
- Martine McCutcheon as Jenny Foster (Series 5)
- David Threlfall as Barry Connery (Series 5)
- Gillian Taylforth as Anne Gilbraith (Series 5)
- Danny Webb as John Gilbraith (Series 5)

== Episodes ==
=== Series overview ===
Series	Episodes	Originally released	
Series	Episodes	First released	Last released
1	7	10 April 1994	22 May 1994
2	13	28 April 1996	21 July 1996
3	7	6 April 1997	18 May 1997
4	6	7 January 1999	11 February 1999
5	4	21 October 2000	11 November 2000

=== Series 1 (1994) ===
The first series consists of seven episodes, and was broadcast from 10 April to 22 May 1994. It was released on DVD on 27 November 2006. The DVD release of the series has become hard to obtain. The series was rebroadcast in Australia for the first time in 2014. This series was repeated on ITV3 on 10 January 2017, 11 January 2017, 12 January 2017, 13 January 2017, 14 January 2017, 17 January 2017 and 18 January 2017.

No.	Title	Directed by	Written by	Original release date
1	"Win Some, Lose Some"	Adrian Shergold	Anita Bronson	10 April 1994
Feature-length episode. Customs and Excise are overwhelmed when they are forced to deal with five concurrent cases. Firstly, Bill and the team organise a raid on an importer who is smuggling heroin in from Jamaica via the postal service, but the suspect becomes less than co-operative when he tries to hide the evidence by swallowing it, causing him to have a severe reaction. Meanwhile, Diane and Eddie are on the trail of an illegal biplane seen landing in a small village outside Norfolk. They suspect it may have links to a smuggling ring, but a stake out proves to be less than fruitful. Bill is contacted by an old friend from Dutch customs, who are on the trail of another drug dealer, who is using an English courier to ferry his goods across the channel. They decide to fake an accident in order to lure the guilty parties into a honeytrap. Meanwhile, Gerry and Nicki go in search of a missing trader of rare antiques, only to stumble upon a collection of illegally imported coins, supposedly meant for wealthy conman George Webster. Back at the airport, Diane, Kevin and Eddie trail a Colombian woman and her associate who have taken drastic measures to resolve her dead husband's debt to a violent Colombian gang.
2	"Love and Respect"	Keith Washington	Anita Bronson	17 April 1994
Bill suspects that Peter Crediton, a respected family man, is importing child pornography from Thailand. When the team track a videotape sent to Crediton, they raid his house and find an attic dedicated to illegal material – but Crediton refuses to talk, exercising his right to silence. Meanwhile, Gerry and Nicki interview George Webster in the presence of his solicitor. Webster denies that the recovered coins have been illegally imported and claims that they belonged to his late mother. Webster then tries to bribe Gerry with tickets to the Arsenal game, but Gerry refuses; however, George later sends him the tickets in the post, which he and Eddie use to attend the sold-out game. Webster then takes the bribery a step further by offering Gerry £1,500 to make the investigation into his activities disappear, which Gerry accepts. Meanwhile, Diane is pleased when the plane is identified by French police as belonging to a suspect that the French authorities believe is involved in the production of drugs. A late night stakeout places the team right in the thick of the action as the courier flies in to make another drop on English soil. Andreotti continues his pursuit of his hairdresser, unaware that she has a boyfriend.
3	"Trouble in Chinatown"	Keith Washington	Anita Bronson	24 April 1994
The search of Peter Crediton's house continues, but Bill is shocked to discover a videotape which implicates his wife in the abuse of their own children. The discovery leads Crediton to reveal the other three members of the paedophile ring involved in the illegal abuse in Thailand. Meanwhile, Gerry submits his report which suggests that the team drop the case against Webster, but Nicki isn't convinced of Gerry's findings and questions his motives. At Heathrow, a courier carrying a cargo of heroin in a video camera from Hong Kong is forced to leave his load behind after being approached by customs. The case goes unsolved until Bill and the team take up the case of Billy Cheung, who is found murdered in Chinatown after a large scale riot between two rival Chinese gangs over the ownership of the Red Dragon restaurant, which the owner previously lost in a game of Mahjong. They discover that Billy was carrying a 'chip chop note', which effectively reimbursed the owner £50,000 for the seized heroin. Meanwhile, Eddie's relationship with George Webster continues to blossom, leading to an offer of some part-time security work. However, Gerry is concerned that Webster's proposal will land him in further trouble.
4	"Endangered Species"	Keith Washington	Anita Bronson	1 May 1994
Aware that the police may have seized the 'chip chop note' found on Billy Cheung's body, the couriers organise for a second shipment of drugs to be brought into the country, again in a camcorder. However, this time, Bill and the team are on the case and stop the mule as he makes his way through Heathrow. They organise for a fake substance to be placed in the camcorder, in order for them to deliver it to its intended recipient – and catch him red-handed. Meanwhile, Eddie discovers that his first assignment for Webster involves couriering a quantity of gold coins across from Jersey. Eddie soon begins to realise, however, that the cargo isn't as legitimate as he first thought, and that he may have gotten himself caught up in a very tricky situation. Meanwhile, a consignment of cargo left behind in a shipping warehouse is smashed accidentally, but the accident reveals a collection of illegally imported elephant parts, including tusks and organs. Kevin tries to get in touch with the consignment owner, but discovers that he is out of the country on business. However, a lead soon comes from the exporters, who are discovered to have listed it, as well as several other consignments, as 'diplomatic cargo'.
5	"Reason for Concern"	Gerry Poulson	Anita Bronson	8 May 1994
Kevin finally manages to track down the owner of the diplomatic cargo, and arranges for it to be collected. Diane organises a trail on the courier, which leads them back to the abandoned farmhouse where they first suspected the goods were being held. With the help of City and South, Diane orders a raid, and the owner is subsequently arrested. Meanwhile, Eddie continues to become weary of Tommy's erratic behaviour. Bill alerts Jersey customs to the possibility of a gold smuggling operation working out of an antique coin shop operating on the island, and they subsequently place surveillance on the premises. Gerry tries to distance himself from Webster after a proposition to courier illegal gold bullion worth £4,000,000. However, Tommy isn't prepared to let him get away without a stern warning. Andreotti continues pursuing his hairdresser in the hope of a romantic tryst; however, he inadvertently accepts an offer of a date from her sister. However, the date proves to be more than fruitful when she offers up information on a shady customer holding a safety deposit box at the bank where she works. The team track him on a return flight through Heathrow and catch him in possession of £40,000.
6	"Show Your Metal"	Keith Washington	Anita Bronson	15 May 1994
Eddie's life continues to spiral out of control. He suspects his wife of having an affair, and follows her to an impromptu meeting with Gerry, unaware that she is simply offloading her marital problems to a friendly ear. Meanwhile, Webster has ambitious plans to smuggle gold bullion across Europe, and asks Gerry if he wants in. Gerry reluctantly agrees, and gives Webster some invaluable inside information on where to store the illegal cargo. Meanwhile, Andreotti is given an opportunity to show what he is made of in the Mullvany case. When the team raid Mulvanny's safety deposit box, they discover a further £40,000 in counterfeit notes. Bewildered at how Mulvanny and his cohort have managed to re-enter the country seven times without being caught, Gerry suspects that they may have swapped their vehicle's number plates whilst out on the continent, a fact which is later confirmed by CCTV footage. A search of Mulvanny's car also uncovers a clever scam involving a botched petrol tank, which is being used to hide the cargo. Meanwhile, Jersey customs continue their surveillance of Webster's operation, but Diane is shocked to discover that one of their prime suspects is none other than Eddie.
7	"Hold Me Close"	Gerry Poulson	Geoffrey Case	22 May 1994
With Scudamore now in charge of the investigation into Eddie's activities, the entire team are placed under suspicion, and it's not long before surveillance capture pictures of Gerry getting cosy with Webster's wife. Bill is convinced that Gerry is innocent, but Scudamore isn't so sure. Meanwhile, Eddie is devastated to learn that Webster no longer requires his services and tries to track him down. Scudamore decides to pull in Eddie before he decides to skip the country, but Eddie is determined not to be arrested and makes a startling decision, which sends shock waves throughout the team. Gerry and Beverley head for Brussels to collect the illegal bullion, unaware that Scudamore is firmly on their tail. With Tommy and his associate lying in wait for delivery, Scudamore heads up a raid on both parties. Gerry denies all knowledge of any illegal cargo, and claims he was simply taking a day's holiday away from prying eyes. Tommy's associate is subsequently arrested, but Tommy manages to escape through a cluttered scrapyard, and out of sight of Bill and the team. Webster is arrested, but denies all knowledge of Gerry's activities, and even claims he was unaware Gerry and his wife were having an affair.

=== Series 2 (1996) ===
The second series consists of thirteen episodes, and was broadcast from 28 April to 21 July 1996. It was released on DVD on 27 August 2007. The DVD release of the series has become hard to obtain. The series was rebroadcast in Australia for the first time in 2014. This series was rebroadcast on ITV3 on 19 January 2017, 20 January 2017, 21 January 2017, 24 January 2017, 25 January 2017, 26 January 2017, 27 January 2017, 28 January 2017, 31 January 2017, 1 February 2017, 2 February 2017, 3 February 2017 and 7 February 2017.

No.	Title	Directed by	Written by	Original release date	UK viewers (millions)
1	"One Day the World Froze"	Keith Washington	Geoffrey Case	28 April 1996	N/A
Tommy Maddern is hired by local gangland thug Eddie Davies to help distribute bootleg alcohol at extortionate prices to unwilling shop owners. Bill is determined to prosecute an importer of child pornography, despite much of the evidence being inadmissible in court. Nadine Charles attempts to smuggle cocaine out of Antigua but part of the stash is stolen. When she arrives at Heathrow, things continue to go badly for her. A friend of Barry’s sister Charmian is shot. Gerry’s replacement, Katherine Roberts, begins to work for Bill’s team. Webster, who is living in the Algarve, receives an unexpected visitor.
2	"Eye of the Eagle"	Keith Washington	Geoffrey Case	5 May 1996	N/A
Barry and Andreotti track down Rufus Teague, Nadine’s contact in London. Meanwhile, Nadine appoints an excellent barrister but the outcome of the trial has dire consequences for her. Bill continues to pursue celebrity ex-footballer Eric Short, who he is convinced is involved in a paedophile ring, and Katherine goes to extreme measures to find the evidence. Maddern looks for a more adventurous way to make money. Everyone is mystified by the exploding shipment from Riga. Following Gerry's suicide, Bill is determined to locate Webster. Charmian asks Barry to look into Davies's business activities.
3	"The Need for Substance"	Gerry Poulson	Geoffrey Case	12 May 1996	N/A
Katherine's radical techniques enrage Bill when she goes under cover to get close to Short, without Bill's consent. Andreotti infiltrates Davies's gang and is shocked to see a familiar face. Diane's team intercepts a man carrying vials of bear bile from Kathmandu and they put pressure on him to reveal his supplier and contact. A Swedish ship brings in some very disturbing video footage but the crew denies all knowledge of it. Maddern's lack of business acumen begins to show through when he becomes involved in shipping caesium. Bill is offered early retirement. Diane and Barry drift further apart.
4	"A Crack in the Mainframe"	Gerry Poulson	Geoffrey Case	19 May 1996	N/A
Bill teams up with Andreotti, hoping to catch Maddern and trace Webster. Meanwhile, Andreotti is eager to shut down the Davies business empire. Jo returns and feels she's being excluded from the Andreotti case. The video confiscated from the Swedish ship is collected and Katherine furthers her involvement with Short. Maddern convinces Webster to travel to Latvia in an effort to finalise the caesium exporting deal, but Maddern soon feels he's being used. Diane's obsession with the bear bile case takes a toll on her health and she has an emotional confession for Barry.
5	"Rotten Weakness"	James Hazeldine	Geoffrey Case	26 May 1996	N/A
A Swedish courier arrives with another package and Katherine intercepts it. Meanwhile, Short gets annoyed with her coy behaviour. When she agrees to spend the night with him, she jeopardises the investigation. Andreotti thinks his cover has been compromised and fears for his safety. Webster ends his business affiliation with Maddern and takes the shipment of caesium into his own hands. Barry moves to his sister's flat. Rufus Teague receives another delivery of cocaine. When Charmian is brutally attacked, Barry vows revenge on the assailant.
6	"Best Served Cold"	Keith Washington	Geoffrey Case	2 June 1996	N/A
Maddern oversees the shipment of caesium from Riga but Webster alters the arrangements at the last moment. Meanwhile, Bill travels to Portugal in an effort to destroy Webster. Katherine is livid that the evidence against Short may not hold up in court. When he contacts her, she feels vulnerable and looks to Arnie for support. Charmian moves in with Diane as she recovers from the attack. Diane informs Katherine that there is an opportunity to locate Teague and Barry risks his life to get revenge.
7	"Hunger for Pennies"	Keith Washington	Geoffrey Case	9 June 1996	N/A
Maddern and DeVooght wait for the caesium shipment in Rotterdam. Webster infuriates them when he adamantly refuses to do the deal on their terms; he also continues to elude those at Customs and Excise. Katherine feels humiliated by the outcome of the Short case. Barry finds a new flat but continues to have difficulty accepting his relationship with Diane is over. Bill returns from Portugal and tries to draw a line under the Maddern and Webster affair once and for all.
8	"Take the Bribe"	Gerry Poulson	Ian Kennedy Martin	16 June 1996	N/A
Tom Bishop, a Customs and Excise man, is murdered in France and Bill's team is determined to find the killer, despite being told to stay off the case. A VAT inspector (Harriet) is curious about the business activities of a Turkish kebab shop. Laurens visits his Azerbaijani heroin supplier and approaches Montfort to share the deal. A German drug exporter, Moller, looks for a British buyer for PCP but has transportation issues. A mysterious load of discarded apples near Heathrow raises suspicion. Barry takes in his troublesome teenage relative and Diane lends a hand with childcare. Diane receives an unexpected dinner invitation.
9	"Noose"	Gerry Poulson	Ian Kennedy Martin	23 June 1996	N/A
Montfort's partner, Geoff, is unhappy about the growing body count. Meanwhile, Montfort is eager to set up the money transaction for the heroin and explores ways to distribute the PCP. Arnie endangers his own life when he asks too many questions about Bishop's death in Lyon. Katherine puts the kebab shop under surveillance and feels excluded from the Bishop investigation. Diane's team looks into fruit distribution companies. Nick continues to create problems for Barry and Andreotti entertains Harriet, the VAT inspector.
10	"A Fallen Horse"	Gerry Poulson	Ian Kennedy Martin	30 June 1996	N/A
Arnie is ordered back to London and he has some important new evidence. However, Bill's superiors are annoyed at his involvement in the case. The kebab shop is put under surveillance but Katherine makes a rudimentary error whilst checking out the property. Montfort doesn't react well to the news that he is to be excluded from the heroin shipment deal and he bickers with Gerry about their business plans. When Nick becomes involved in a dubious graphics business run by his classmate, Barry becomes suspicious and goes to Diane for advice. Ryan perseveres in his efforts to seduce Diane.
11	"Out of the Picture"	James Hazeldine	Ian Kennedy Martin	7 July 1996	N/A
The net begins to close on the kebab shop owners but CCTV footage alerts them to a potential raid. Montford and Laurens continue with their plan to eliminate the Azerbaijani heroin dealers. Montfort also wants Geoff out of the picture. Jo secretly re-opens the file on Short. Bill is convinced there is a connection between Bishop's death and the kebab shop investigation. Barry talks to Bill about Nick's moneymaking scheme and they tail Daafyd. Moller experiences some communication problems. Diane meets Ryan's children and hears from his ex-wife.
12	"The Organ Grinder"	Gerry Poulson	Ian Kennedy Martin	14 July 1996	N/A
Montfort tries to cover his tracks. Moller gets agitated when she hears there is a new delivery address but seals the PCP deal with Montfort regardless. Nick identifies where he has been delivering the printouts. Bill’s team finds some interesting documents when they search Fauld’s business and home. Arnie flies to Lyon to help with the Bishop investigation when the owner of the chef knives is located. A raid on the Staines property proves fruitful. When Diane meets Ryan's ex-wife, she learns some unsettling things.
13	"Hard Task"	Gerry Poulson	Ian Kennedy Martin	21 July 1996	N/A
Bill links Fauld, Montfort, Lyon, the heroin and the lard deliveries to the kebab house but is unable to put any names to any faces. To secure an identification, he must get the Turkish, shot chef to London, alive. Arnie assists French Customs and Excise. Diane's team knock the LSD dealer's house and Daafyd's parents get a shock when they arrive at the airport. Laurens persuades Montfort to talk with the Azerbaijani suppliers and proceeds with his plan to eliminate the headman. Moller's storage premises are raided.

=== Series 3 (1997) ===
The third series consists of seven episodes, and was broadcast from 6 April to 18 May 1997. The series has never been released on DVD, and repeats have been very few and far between. This series was rebroadcast on ITV3 on 8 February 2017, 9 February 2017, 10 February 2017, 14 February 2017, 15 February 2017, 16 February 2017 and 17 February 2017.

No.	Title	Directed by	Written by	Case	Original release date
1	"About The Long And Short Of It"	James Hazeldine	Geoffrey Case	Case #1, Part 1/2	6 April 1997
When a diabetic security guard is taken ill, it emerges that the medication he has been taking is counterfeit. Although numerous pharmacies have been caught distributing fake drugs, the Medicines Control Agency informs Bill that there is too little evidence to prosecute. Meanwhile, children in numerous African countries are being treated with unsteralized needles and Customs and Excise are interested in some unconventional routes being used to ship medical supplies in and out of the UK.
2	"Wavelength"	James Hazeldine	Geoffrey Case	Case #1, Part 2/2	13 April 1997
In an effort to prevent the export of more counterfeit medicine into the UK, Barry and Diane team up to travel to West Africa. When they visit a hospital for refugees, they see first hand how damaging imitation drugs can be. When Badcott suddenly changes his modus operandi they suspect an African Customs Officer may be tipping him off; however, proving it is more problematic than they imagined. The Blakes are strapped for cash and are prepared to go to extreme measures to improve their situation.
3	"Russian Roulette"	Gerry Poulson	Ian Kennedy Martin	Case #2, Part 1/4	20 April 1997
Smuggler John Danson prepares to collect his latest shipment of illegal cargo from the Suffolk coast, unaware that he is being watched by a pair of thugs hired by a former group of East German police who are determined to become part of Danson's operation, having recently also infiltrated a major counterfeiting operation being run by Desmond Dewhurst, a plate replicator. Bill receives a call confirming that a car containing a plate used for counterfeiting $20 bills has been stopped at Plymouth docks. The driver of the vehicle, Milne, is arrested, but he refuses to co-operate. Acting on information from a bug in the office of Milne's lawyer, the team intercept a burglary at the police warehouse, where a hired professional is attempting to take back the seized plate. However, when he is shot by a rooftop sniper, the team are forced to split their investigation with local CID. Meanwhile, Diane and Barry attempt to stop a shipment of Danson's illegal goods coming through Heathrow, but are caught off guard by a decoy. On instruction from US customs, Bill sends Andreotti and Arnie to Morocco to locate Dewhurst, while Danson is confronted in his remote cottage by a professional hitman.
4	"The Combination of Two"	Gerry Poulson	Ian Kennedy Martin	Case #2, Part 2/4	27 April 1997
John Danson tries to protect his son by burying Noveski's body, and the East Germans become concerned when their hit man fails to return to London. Meanwhile, when another shipment of Danson's arrives, Diane tasks Jake to track it, but in the heat of the moment, he manages to lose the two passengers as they escape on motorbikes. However, Diane is pleased to discover that the van contains a substantial quantity of illegally imported tobacco. Bill praises Lynn for managing to get suspect Rhona Ellis to open up. Kevin spots the woman and child from the decoy drop at Heathrow the previous day, this time getting off a flight from Amsterdam. He and Barry trail her to a workshop, where they find a quantity of heroin and cocaine. Eddie Davies informs Danson that he is getting a team together to take out the East Germans, while Danson tries to protect his son by persuading his mother to take him back. In Morocco, Arnie and Andreotti continue to find locating Dewhurst problematic. However, they are surprised to receive a telephone call from Dewhurst's accomplice, Micky Comino, asking them for help. They arrange a meet, but Micky is followed by two of the East German mob.
5	"Protected"	Frank W. Smith	Ian Kennedy Martin	Case #2, Part 3/4	4 May 1997
Eddie Davies looks after Tim Danson while John is away on business. As Danson is overseeing a consignment of tobacco in Suffolk, an attempt is made on his life by the East Germans; however, Danson manages to escape. Meanwhile, Tim's mother becomes concerned for his welfare and contacts the police, and informs Diane that Tim was responsible for the murder of one of the East German's thugs. Meanwhile, Bill is facing trouble from all sides, as his superiors aren't happy with the ongoing investigation into the plate theft. Sallinger is released on bail, and Alex tracks him back to his office, where he arranges a meeting later that night. Meanwhile, Dewhurst and Anna are tracked down in Casablanca by Leakey, who informs them he wants out of the gang and offers them two tickets back to London. Arnie and Andreotti receive help from a local police chief, who leads them to one of Dewhurst's contacts, who claims that he hasn't spoken to Dewhurst in months. As the East German gang finally catch up with him, Dewhurst makes his getaway. Bill and Barry lie in wait for Sallinger, unaware he has already met an untimely end. The East Germans break into Danson's house and kidnap Tim.
6	"Track and Trace"	Frank W. Smith	Ian Kennedy Martin	Case #2, Part 4/4	11 May 1997
Danson is livid when he learns that his son has been kidnapped by the East German gang. Meanwhile, Dewhurst and Ransley arrive in London and are trailed to their hotel. Alex is quizzed by McKenzie over the information he passed over to Bill shortly before Sallinger was found dead. Bill is then warned by McKenzie and Scudamore that if he continues to investigate, he will be suspended from duty. Dewhurst contacts Leakey and asks him to arrange a meeting with Danson. Leakey misinforms the East Germans that Dewhurst is just two weeks away from completing a new plate to replace the one seized by Customs. Arnie and Andreotti return from Morocco are asked to take up surveillance on Dewhurst. They trail him to a warehouse, where he meets up with Danson and Leakey. En route to a planned meet with the Germans, Dewhurst is forced out of the meet by Danson, leaving Jake to pursue him on foot – but he once again manages to lose him. Danson and Leakey arrive at the meet, but Danson is determined to get his son back and get revenge, and opens fire on the gang. McKenzie is reprimanded by Scudamore for failing to act on Bill's information. Bill decides to take out Dewhurst once and for all.
7	"Walk the Line"	Gerry Poulson	Geoffrey Case	Case #3	18 May 1997
Lynn is on the trail of teenager Wayne Jennings, who is suspected of being the main distributor for a major Ecstasy importer. Meanwhile, Diane and Kevin are on the trail of long-time villain Robbie Reynolds, who pops over for an afternoon from Spain to conduct a deal with spare car parts trader Sidney Wells. They discover that Wells, along with his nephew, Billy, is running a car exportation racket, stealing top of the range sports cars and 4x4s, replacing their number plates, and then exporting them to Eastern Europe. Alex uses his initiative and decides to approaches Wells in the hope of luring him into a honeytrap, but Bill is unimpressed and reprimands him. Meanwhile, surveillance on Jennings reveals that one of his acquaintances happens to be none other than Billy Wells – leading City and South to discover that Diane and Kevin's case is connected to theirs. As a joint operation gets underway, Billy Wells is nearly caught in the act after a stolen vehicle he is driving is caught up in a road traffic collision with a group of joyriders. As Arnie and Andreotti pursue the suspect they assume to be the Ecstasy mule, Bill and the team lie in wait for Wells and Reynolds to receive their next batch of stolen vehicles.

=== Series 4 (1999) ===
The fourth series consists of six episodes, and was broadcast from 7 January to 11 February 1999. This series was the last to feature many of the original cast members, including Enzo Squillino, Jr. and Andrew Dunn; and was also the last series to feature multi-part stories (in this case, two stories of three episodes each). The series has never been released on DVD, and although repeats have been very few and far between, the series was repeated in full from 13–20 June 2016, on ITV3. This Series was rebroadcast on ITV3 on 21 February 2017, 22 February 2017, 23 February 2017, 24 February 2017, 28 February 2017 and 1 March 2017.

No.	Title	Directed by	Written by	Original release date	UK viewers (millions)	Case
1	"A Stake in Terror"	Gerry Poulson	Steve Trafford	7 January 1999	Under 8.74m	Case #1, Part 1/3
A South African terrorist group is looking for supplies of plutonium dioxide to complete the production of a nuclear suitcase bomb, capable of causing as much damage as the nuclear disaster in Chernobyl. International businessman Greg Taylor, who has links to Russian suppliers capable of producing the materials, and has a buyer waiting for the completed weapon, is happy to act as intermediary. However, the Russian request payment in money and cocaine, forcing Taylor to enlist the help of one-time drugs kingpin Frankie Johnson. When City and South discover that Johnson has all of a sudden become flush with money, Alex and Lynn are tasked with keeping surveillance on Johnson and his associates. Meanwhile, Taylor and a Russian associate meet with a courier who has been enlisted by Johnson to carry the next shipment of Plutonium over to South Africa. Whilst on his way to the weapons plant, he suffers severe radiation burns, and as a result, collapses when he returns to London. Meanwhile, father-of-one James Wilton comes under Diane and Kevin's radar after they discover he has imported an illegal gun, which he intends to use to assassinate a drug dealer who killed his daughter.
2	"Heaven and Hell"	Gerry Poulson	Steve Trafford	14 January 1999	Under 8.90m	Case #1, Part 2/3
Concerned that the courier of the latest shipment of Plutonium has found his way back to London, Taylor puts pressure on Frankie Johnson to solve the problem. Unaware that their shipment of drugs has already been seized by customs, Johnson pressures the courier's sister into revealing that he has been admitted to hospital with severe radiation burns. Johnson orders a hit, sending a fake nurse into the courier's hospital room to administer him with a lethal dose of heroin. Meanwhile, Taylor's buyer starts putting pressure on him to secure the final shipments of Plutonium, but he begins to feel the strain when the Russians refuse to negotiate their side of the deal. After a bug planted in Taylor's library reveals that Johnson is bringing in a shipment of drugs from Denver, City and South stake out a hotel where the courier is set to meet with Johnson's associates. However, Barry's radio malfunctions, causing Johnson's associates to panic and make a sharp exit, much to Scudamore's disgust. However, Ancrom proves he is a team player by taking the rap for Barry's mistake. Meanwhile, Andreotti is on the trail of an illegal fuel supplier, Alex Fisher, who is turning red dye tractor fuel into roadworthy diesel.
3	"Call Time"	Gerry Poulson	Steve Trafford	21 January 1999	8.07m	Case #1, Part 3/3
Following their surveillance operation on the nuclear weapons plant in South Africa, Scudamore orders a knock, but the South African Army discover that bomb maker Jani De Groot has been murdered, and the weapon stolen. Meanwhile, Steve Doyle hot foots it out to Marbella to join Frankie Johnson, but is shocked to find Frankie dead in his swimming pool. Taylor, concerned that his operation is falling apart, approaches his buyer, who confirms that he ordered the hit on the weapons plant. Taylor arranges a deal for the final delivery of Plutonium required to complete the bomb. Meanwhile, Scudamore and Ancrom go in search of Taylor's Russian associate, but find him shot dead in his hotel room. Andreotti and Hickson's surveillance on Taylor goes pearshaped when Taylor realises that Customs are on to him. As Taylor meets with his buyer's personal assistant to agree the deal for the last shipment of Plutonium, Doyle tries to play the situation to his advantage and threatens Taylor with a gun. Ancrom orders a knock, but finds Taylor has swapped his van and the delivery is nowhere to be seen. Barry, relegated to desk duty by Ancrom, is eager to prove he is a valuable member of the team.
4	"Tough Cookie"	Frank W. Smith	Stephen Leather	28 January 1999	8.76m	Case #2, Part 1/2
When Toni Maxwell, the wife of an imprisoned major drug dealer, takes over his business empire, she proves to be a formidable force to reckon with. With Diane and the team firmly on her tail, she is forced to explore new ways of importing her goods into the country. A consignment of dodgy fire retardant sofas raises Lynn's suspicions, and she soon manages to connect them to Maxwell's operation. Meanwhile, Maxwell's right hand man, Hewson, travels to Thailand in order to check over the latest consignment of girls carrying drugs inside breast implants, unaware that he is being tailed by Alex. However, when Alex tries to follow a courier who is sent to trade Hewson's Ecstasy for the cocaine wanted by Maxwell, he manages to lose him – and the £20,000 stash. Ancrom is asked to investigate when an illegal immigrant is found in the luggage compartment of a tourist coach, which has come from the continent. The man tries to claim asylum, and offers Ancrom information on a drug smuggling operation by a dangerous gang of Algerian Mafia. In an attempt to gather further evidence, Ancrom sends Barry in undercover with the company's cleaning staff, but Barry soon finds himself in deep water.
5	"Out of Control"	Frank W. Smith	Stephen Leather	4 February 1999	8.45m	Case #2, Part 2/3
Lynn offers to help Alex out of a tight corner, and the pair uncover evidence that Toni Maxwell's next shipment of fake sofas is due to come into Tilbury docks within the next 48 hours, much to the delight of Ancrom. Meanwhile, Hewson is eager to make his peace with Maxwell, but despite convincing her that he is no longer co-operating with City and South, Toni refuses to play ball. As Ancrom organises an op to bust Maxwell when she meets with the load, Barry receives word that the next shipment of drugs coming in on the continental coaches that evening. Ancrom, faced with the possibility of two major busts in 24 hours, meets with Diane to celebrate, unaware that Mahmood has been captured and Barry's cover has been blown, leaving him in grave danger. When Ancrom realises Barry has disappeared, Diane goes to extreme lengths to ensure his safety by making a promise to Toni Maxwell that could threaten her job. Meanwhile, she and Kevin investigate when a shipment of radiator parts bound for a Chinese Restaurant in London turns out to be a box full of illegally imported snakes. They track the shipment to an abandoned churchyard, where Diane comes face to face with more than snakes.
6	"Last Ditch Opportunity"	Gerry Poulson	Stephen Leather	11 February 1999	8.48m	Case #3
Ancrom and Diane are alerted when a suitcase containing nearly £500,000 worth of heroin is stopped at Heathrow. Suspecting the case may be part of an organised scam, they are surprised when baggage handler Gilchrist approaches them with information on how the operation is being run. Kevin is placed with Gilchrist and his family in the event that his colleagues find out that he has grassed them up – and try to take retribution. Meanwhile, Ancrom asks Lynn and Alex to look at Jeremy Thompson, a regular traveller, who Ports are convinced is running some form of smuggling operation. On the surface, they find nothing when they make a search of Thompson's car, but Lynn soon comes to realise that the very thing that nobody would suspect could be the very thing he is smuggling. Meanwhile, Gilchrist informs Ancrom of the latest delivery of drugs due in from Delhi. Ancrom and Diane search the cases before they are delivered to the courier, before placing a tracker inside both of them. As they lie in wait for the villains to make their move, Diane finds herself under increasing pressure from Toni Maxwell, who is determined to repay the favour for Diane refusing to give evidence against her at her trial.

=== Series 5 (2000) ===
The fifth and final series consists of four episodes, and was broadcast from 21 October to 11 November 2000. This series saw a major overhaul in both the production team and cast; with Caroline Lee-Johnson, Steve Toussaint and Daniel Brown the only three cast members to return. The format of the series was also very different, featuring four stand-alone stories, with the running time extended to 105 minutes per episode, with advertisements. A new theme tune and title sequence was also introduced. The series has never been released on DVD, and although repeats have been very few and far between, the series was repeated in full from 21–24 June 2016 on ITV3. This Series was rebroadcast on ITV3 on 2 March 2017, 3 March 2017, 9 March 2017 and 10 March 2017.

No.	Title	Directed by	Written by	Original release date	UK viewers (millions)
1	"Armed and Dangerous"	Nigel Douglas	Julian Jones	21 October 2000	6.96m
Alex and Barry, investigating a tip-off of an unregistered container at Tilbury docks, are surprised to find the load, which consists of AK-47s and other associated weaponry, has been booby trapped. When an officer from Indigo, the government's new anti-smuggling task force, is injured in the subsequent blast, Barry is asked to join the team in his absence. He discovers that head of Indigo Glen Vaughan, along with former colleague Diane Ralston, are investigating illegal arms trafficking from Kosovo to Liberia. They suspect the weapons were meant for a war hungry Liberian army general, who intends to use them against his own people. When the Liberian army kidnap two members of an aid charity, Worldwide Aid, they ask that government minister, Simon Reid, speaks with the home office to secure them a delivery of arms to ensure the safety of the two hostages. Meanwhile, Alex is on the trail of a drug smuggler, whose girlfriend is caught coming through Heathrow with £12,000 worth of cocaine. When he discovers that the man is possession of a gun which matches the batch discovered by Indigo, he realises the two cases are connected. Jess and Rob are sent to Kosovo to track the shipment.
2	"The Mole"	Paul Wroblewski	Stephen Leather	28 October 2000	8.20m
Vaughan organised a raid on a shipment of Ecstasy being imported by known dealer Rick Foster, but during the raid, he manages to escape and subsequently skips the country. Despite this, only a small quantity of the suspected haul is recovered, leading Vaughan and Diane to suspect that Foster was tipped off by a mole within the team. They subsequently head to Ibiza to keep tabs on Foster's sister Jenny, who as well as assisting her brother, has been involved with the production and importation of an illegal party drug known as Yabba. Meanwhile, back in the UK, Barry and Rob raid a club where Yabba has supposedly been sold. During the raid, Barry is confronted by an armed man with a gun, who he is shocked to discover is none other than Alex. Alex is subsequently arrested, and questioned over his association with Foster. Vaughan subsequently suspects that Barry may be the mole, after discovering that Barry has visited Alex in prison – but his suspicions soon turn elsewhere. Jess goes undercover, posing as a security guard, to try to get close to Jenny. However, when her cover is blown, it is left to Alex – who Barry realises is undercover – to alert Indigo and ensure Jess is brought to safety.
3	"Poison"	Richard Holthouse	Doug Briggs	4 November 2000	6.91m
When a suspected drug dealer collapses and dies after being tailed by the team through Heathrow, Vaughan discovered the man's cargo is none other than the poisonous dart frog, an endangered species that can only be imported for scientific research. Using information gathered from the courier's previous visits, they discover a link to a local pet shop, but when they arrive, they find the proprietor has also fallen victim to the poison. Meanwhile, Vaughan discovers that an old contact from the Miami police is in London, and arranges a meet, unaware that he on the tail of a major drugs importer who left Vaughan for dead during a bungled drugs raid in Florida several years previously. When his contact is later found dead having been the victim of torture, Vaughan realises that their two cases are connected – and that along with the poison dart frogs, £12,000,000 in diamonds and £500,000 in heroin are also being smuggled into the country. However, it isn't long before the team's prime suspect, Barry Connery, decides to up the ante, threatening Vaughan's wife – and taking Diane hostage. Meanwhile, the team are surprised to discover that Alex has been drafted into Indigo as Rob Maguire's replacement.
4	"Power Trip"	Keith Boak	Chris Lang	11 November 2000	Under 5.98m
Vaughan organises a raid on the home of a suspected paedophile, but when the team force entry, they discover the house has been booby trapped and it bursts into flames, taking the evidence – and their suspect – with it. Meanwhile, a local vigilante aiming to put paid to a paedophile ring operating in the area is found badly beaten, but despite Vaughan's urgency for information, the man is unable to talk. Evidence found at the scene leads the team to a model agency, being run by John and Anne Gilbraith, who sometimes employ the services of teenage girls for modelling. Back at HQ, a prominent MP approaches Scudamore when his daughter fails to board a flight to Spain to see her mother, and Vaughan suspects that she may be the latest victim of the paedophile ring. Meanwhile, Alex is on the trail of Colin Hunter, a man last seen on CCTV leading the missing girl into his car. With Jess on surveillance, Alex forces entry to Hunter's flat and discovers the address of a website which shares inappropriate images of underage children. Vaughan heads to Malaga to try to locate the missing girl, and break the ring – but discovers he may be too late, as the culprits have already fled back to London in the end.
