= Bomb Harvest =

- Theatrical release poster
- Directed by: Kim Mordaunt
- Screenplay by: Kim Mordaunt and Sylvia Wilczynski
- Produced by: Sylvia Wilczynski
- Starring: Laith Stevens
- Edited by: Sloane Klevin
- Music by: Caitlin Yeo
- Distributed by: TVF International
- Release date: 2007
- Running time: 88 minutes
- Country: Australia
- Language: English

Bomb Harvest is a 2007 documentary film directed by Australian filmmaker Kim Mordaunt and produced by Sylvia Wilczynski. It explores the consequences of war in Laos as it follows an Australian bomb disposal specialist, training locals in the skill of detonating bombs while trying to stop villagers, particularly children, from finding them and using them for scrap metal.

During the Vietnam War, Laos was the target of the heaviest US bombing campaign, making Laos the most bombed country in history: from 1964 until 1973 more than two million tonnes of bombs were dropped, including 260 million cluster munitions. An estimated 30% of the bombs dropped failed to detonate as intended. Unexploded ordnance (UXO) continues to kill and injure people, and, as a consequence of large tracts of land (with evidence of UXOs) being sealed off, the local population are prevented from using it, including for the vital purpose of growing food. Casualties and deaths are still frequently reported, particularly amongst children and adolescents who are tempted into the restricted areas for many reasons, for example: to recapture livestock, to forage or to attempt to retrieve scrap metal, which is still a lucrative business. UXO is a key causative factor in the continuing high levels of poverty and is seen as stifling the economic and agricultural development of the country.

Bomb Harvest explores how three generations of people have been left to deal with the consequences of the air war, and depicts the bravery of those trying to clear up its remnants.

The film crew spent two months on the ground with bomb disposal teams from the Mines Advisory Group as they dealt with live bombs, in areas of Laos which have never been filmed in before. The film premiered at the 2007 Sydney Film Festival, and won a Children's Advocacy award at the 2008 Artivist Film Festival.

== See also ==
- Cluster Munition Coalition
- Convention on Cluster Munitions
- History of Laos
- International Campaign to Ban Landmines
- Iron harvest, the collection of unexploded munitions and other metal objects by farmers in areas of France and Belgium that were host to battles during World War I on the Western Front
- Operation Barrel Roll
- Plain of Jars
