= Jack of Hearts (TV series) =

British television crime drama series

- Genre: Crime drama
- Written by: Sian Orrells
- Directed by: Timothy Lyn
- Starring: Keith Allen; Anna Mountford; Douglas Henshall; Ruth Madoc; Andrew Sachs; Eluned Jones; Caroline Berry; Steve Toussaint; Miranda Llewellyn-Jenkins; Siobhan Flynn; Geraint Morgan
- Opening theme: "Jack of Hearts" — Bonnie Tyler
- Composer: Mark Thomas
- Country of origin: United Kingdom
- Original language: English
- No. of series: 1
- No. of episodes: 6

Production
- Executive producers: Pedr James; Maggie Russell
- Producer: Dawn Walters
- Cinematography: Rory Taylor
- Editors: Tim Kruydenburg; Greg Miller
- Running time: 50 minutes
- Production company: BBC Cymru Wales

Original release
- Network: BBC One
- Release: 4 August – 8 September 1999

Jack of Hearts is a six-part British television crime drama series, written by Sian Orrells and directed by Timothy Lay, that first broadcast on BBC One between 4 August and 8 September 1999. Set and filmed in Cardiff, the series follows the life of a tough-talking probation officer, Jack Denby (Keith Allen), who finds that life and crime in the Welsh capital is much different to the workings of inner-city London, when he is forced to move away to join his girlfriend, Suzanne (Anna Mountford), a university lecturer.

The series was broadcast on Wednesdays at 21:30, and was also repeated on Thursdays and Saturdays on BBC Choice. The series was also accompanied by a theme written especially for the series, performed by Bonnie Tyler.

== Cast ==
- Keith Allen as Jack Denby
- Anna Mountford as Suzanne Pryce
- Douglas Henshall as Stan Denby
- Ruth Madoc as Jean Pryce
- Andrew Sachs as Peter Pryce
- Eluned Jones as Marjorie Haines
- Caroline Berry as Caroline Evans
- Steve Toussaint as Joe
- Miranda Llewellyn-Jenkins as Katie
- Siobhan Flynn as Lisa
- Geraint Morgan as Eric

== Episodes ==
No.	Title	Directed by	Written by	Original release date
1	"Episode 1"	Timothy Lay	Sian Orrells	4 August 1999
2	"Episode 2"	Timothy Lay	Sian Orrells	11 August 1999
3	"Episode 3"	Timothy Lay	Sian Orrells	18 August 1999
4	"Episode 4"	Timothy Lay	Sian Orrells	25 August 1999
5	"Episode 5"	Timothy Lay	Sian Orrells	1 September 1999
6	"Episode 6"	Timothy Lay	Sian Orrells	8 September 1999

== Reception ==
Mark Lawson of The Guardian gave the series a mixed review, writing; "Keith Allen's new series Jack of Hearts, about a hard-bitten parole officer, is a textbook lesson in formulaic drama. But it might just have that something it needs to find an audience."
