= Desert War (miniseries) =

Australian documentary series

Desert War is an Australian two-part documentary series screened in 2013 portraying segments of the North African Campaign in World War II. The first episode covers the Siege of Tobruk from 10 April to September 1941, when the 9th Australian Division provided the backbone of the defence against attacks by Italian and German forces under Lieutenant General Erwin Rommel. The second episode covers the preparations for the major Allied counter-attack and victory under Bernard Montgomery in the Second Battle of El Alamein. It is demonstrated that extensive and accurate military intelligence, which greatly empowered Rommel for a long period, was gained through the copying of a burgled code book and regular indiscreet radio transmissions from the American embassy in Cairo. When these transmissions were terminated, advantage shifted overwhelmingly to the Allies. The series combines docudrama footage shot in a desert landscape in Western Australia with retouched archive film and interviews with British and Australian veterans of the campaign.
