= I Am a Girl =

- Film poster
- Directed by: Rebecca Barry
- Written by: Ababam zmMzk
- Produced by: Rebecca Barry
- Cinematography: Nicola Daley
- Music by: John Gray
- Distributed by: Women Make Movies (North America); Titan View (Australia); TVF International
- Release date: 28 August 2013
- Running time: 88 minutes
- Country: Australia
- Language: English

I Am a Girl is a 2013 documentary that follows six girls aged between 17 and 19 from the United States, Australia, Cambodia, Afghanistan, Cameroon, and Papua New Guinea, highlighting issues of gender inequality, domestic abuse, mental health and family planning. The story is told through interviews with the girls and cinematic observational footage as they experience important events and rites of passage in their lives. The film's producer and director, Rebecca Barry, is a filmmaker from Australia. The film is distributed by Women Make Movies in North America, Titan View in Australia, and TVF International in the rest of the world.

== Award nominations and festivals ==
I Am A Girl has been nominated for numerous awards, including the following:

- Australian Academy of Cinema and Television Arts Award (2014) for Best Feature Length Documentary
- Australian Academy of Cinema and Television Arts Award (2014) for Best Direction in a Documentary
- Australian Academy of Cinema and Television Arts Award (2014) for Best Cinematography in a Documentary
- Australian Academy of Cinema and Television Arts Award (2014) for Best Editing
- Australian Directors Guild Award (2014) for Best Documentary Feature
- Honorary Award at the 2013 Byron Bay International Film Festival.

I Am A Girl has been selected for the following festivals:

- Breath of Fresh Air Film Festival, Australia (2013)
- Through Women's Eyes Film Festival at Sarasota Film Festival, USA (2014)
- Films From the South, Norway (2014)

== Reviews ==
The film has been described as 'deeply inspirational and succinctly moving'. Another critic has stated that 'there are moments and images in this film that will stay with you a long time'.
