= Kim Mordaunt =

- Education: University of Technology Sydney
- Occupations: Actor; cinematographer; director

Kim Mordaunt is a well known Australian director, cinematographer and actor who comes from a documentary background. He graduated from UTS (University of Technology, Sydney) and got a diploma in acting from LAMDA (London Academy of Music and Dramatic Art).

== Popular works ==
Bomb Harvest (2007) - A feature- length documentary was nominated for Best Documentary (IF Awards, ATOM Awards and Film Critics Circle of Australia Awards), Best Director (ADG Awards), Best Cinematography (AFI Awards) and won Best Feature (children's rights) at Hollywood's Artivist Awards.

The Rocket (2013) won the best Original Screenplay at the AACTA Awards, Best Original Screenplay at the AWGIE Awards, the Australian Directors Guild Award for Best Direction and the Audience Award at the 2013 Sydney Film Festival.
