= The 21 Conspiracy =

Australian web series

The 21 Conspiracy is a low budget Australian web series following a group attempting to uncover a worldwide conspiracy one only learns at 21. It was nominated in the class "Individual episode" for the 2009 Webby Awards, and featured by Wes Craven in his Halloween 2008 picks.
