= Laotian Australians =

Australians associated with Laos

ຄົນລາວອົດສະຕຣາລີ

Total population
- 10,402 (by birth)

Regions with significant populations
- New South Wales: 5,227
- Victoria: 2,224
- Queensland: 1,421
- Australian Capital Territory: 681

Languages
- Australian English · Lao · Hmong

Religion
- Theravada Buddhism · Christianity · Other

Related ethnic groups
- Lao people, Isan people, Thai Australians, other Asian Australians

Laotian Australians, also known as Lao Australians (Lao: ຄົນລາວອົດສະຕຣາລີ), refers to Australians who have either migrated from Laos and/or have Lao ancestry. The first Lao people that came to live in Australia arrived through the Colombo Plan in the 1960s, which gave a number of Laotians the opportunity to live and study in Australia. The migration of the Lao commenced with the Indochinese refugee crisis in 1975 following communist regime takeovers. According to the 2016 Census, there are 10,402 Laos-born Australians with the majority residing in New South Wales.

== Demographic ==
The Laos-born community in Australia comprises several ethnic groups including the native Lao, Chinese, Hmong and Vietnamese groups. According to the 2016 Australian Census, most Laotian-Australians are ethnically Lao (64.3%), followed by Chinese (15.1%), Hmong (7.6%), Vietnamese (5.4%) and 7.5% identified as Other Ancestry. Most Lao stated they spoke Lao at home, followed by English, Hmong and Mandarin. The history of Lao people in Australia is more recent compared to other migrant populations, with over 80 percent of Laos-born people arriving in Australia pre-2007 compared to 60 percent for the overall overseas-born population.

Geographically, most Laotian-Australians are concentrated in New South Wales (50.2%) and Victoria (21.4%), which can be attributed to historical establishment of migrant hostels in these areas that housed recently arrived migrants.

=== Historical population statistics ===
Population of Laos-born people in Australia, state and territory
	Australia			New South Wales			Victoria			Queensland			South Australia		
Year of Census	Males	Females	Total	Males	Females	Total	Males	Females	Total	Males	Females	Total	Males	Females	Total
1976	232	191	423	124	110	235	59	34	92	4	0	4	15	17	32
1981	2674	2589	5263	1714	1666	3380	563	531	1094	60	58	118	61	85	146
1986	3784	3598	7382	2365	2220	4585	846	829	1675	126	106	232	96	107	203
1991	4877	4748	9625	2916	2782	5698	1076	1098	2174	264	260	524	108	119	227
1996	4945	4938	9883	2802	2769	5571	1071	1099	2170	400	398	798	134	145	279
2001	4697	4868	9565	2613	2686	5299	983	1041	2024	438	449	887	208	219	427
2006	4515	4857	9372	2403	2632	5035	982	1063	2045	511	523	1034	216	218	434
2011	4687	5244	9931	2397	2703	5100	1018	1142	2160	635	678	1313	211	233	444
2016 (Note: Data for the Laos-born population in Australia by sex, state and territory for 2016 is provided as an estimate.)	5100	5850	10950	2600	2920	5520	1080	1270	2350	690	830	1510	280	280	560
	Western Australia			Tasmania			Northern Territory			Australian Capital Territory					
Year of Census	Males	Females	Total	Males	Females	Total	Males	Females	Total	Males	Females	Total			
1976	10	4	14	7	8	15	0	3	3	10	12	22			
1981	38	34	72	13	16	29	8	19	18	198	182	380			
1986	40	45	85	15	17	32	13	20	33	283	254	537			
1991	56	56	112	68	67	135	15	20	35	374	346	720			
1996	61	62	123	84	80	164	19	21	40	374	364	738			
2001	75	79	154	42	40	82	16	19	35	322	335	657			
2006	72	80	152	12	13	25	16	16	32	303	313	616			
2011	87	116	203	11	17	28	21	23	44	307	332	639			
2016	90	150	230	20	20	40	20	20	40	330	360	700			

== History in Australia ==
=== Pre-migration and White Australia policy ===
Following the establishment of the Commonwealth of Australia on 1 January 1901, one of the first pieces of legislation passed was the Immigration Restriction Act 1901, infamously known as the ‘White Australia policy’. The law placed restrictions on non-European immigration and made it difficult for Asians in particular to migrate to Australia. The act required that all migrants pass a European language dictation test in order to stay in the country. Subsequently, most Asian migrants were unable to pass the test, as it was administered at the discretion of immigration officials. The intention of keeping Australia white was bolstered by Edmund Barton, the nation's first prime minister, who said of the ‘Chinaman’:

“I do not think either that the doctrine of the equality of man was really ever intended to include racial equality. There is no racial equality. There is basic inequality. These races are, in comparison with white races—I think no one wants convincing of this fact—unequal and inferior.”

At the time, the overwhelming majority (98%) of Australians were white. In 1958, the requirement to pass the dictation test was removed and in 1975, the Whitlam government effectively ended the White Australia policy by passing the Racial Discrimination act, thus creating a path for Asian migration to commence in the years following.

=== The Colombo Plan ===
The first instance of Lao people staying in Australia consisted primarily of students who arrived through the Colombo Plan. Approximately 150 people of Laos-descent resided in Australia pre-1975, and by the beginning of 1975 there were over 600 Indochinese students in the nation in total.

=== Mass migration of Indochinese refugees, 1970–80s ===
In 1975, the abolition of the Kingdom of Laos and subsequent establishment of a communist state led to a tenth of the Lao population fleeing the country. The Australian Government established the Humanitarian Program in 1977, as a response to the influx of Indochinese migrants seeking asylum in the country which allowed Lao refugees to settle in Australia

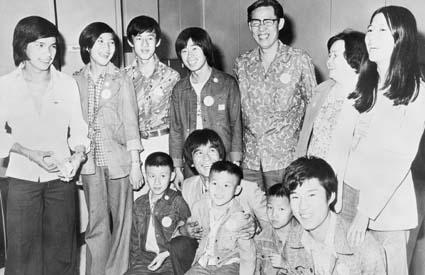
Lao family arriving at Melbourne Airport in 1977

In mid-1976, there were over 400 Laos-born people in Australia, and by 1986 this figure expanded to over 7000. The Lao constituted a small portion of Indochinese refugees, compared to over 80,000 Vietnamese and 13,000 Cambodians who resettled in 1986. During this migration period, Lao people crossed the Lao-Thai border by boat or by swimming and settled in Thai refugee camps. Most Lao people who migrated by boat were accompanied by their spouses, relatives and/or friends, in contrast to the experiences of other Indochinese refugees who were often separated from their family and friends during their journey to the Thai refugee camps.

=== Experience in migrant centers, 1970–80s ===
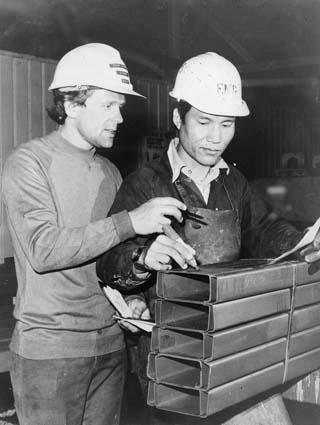
Lao man working in construction in 1978

Following mass migration in the mid-to-late 1970s, Lao people amongst other Indochinese refugees were initially housed in migrant hostels. Commonwealth Hostels Limited, a government-sponsored organisation, operated 25 hostels which, in addition to accommodation, provided English-language courses, healthcare, catering and welfare services to new migrants. Several hostels in New South Wales were located in Cabramatta, Westbridge and East Hills, which has influenced the establishment of Indochinese enclaves near these areas and the broader Fairfield Local Government Area (LGA) in the present 2010s. In Victoria, there were migrant centers in Broadmeadows, Nunawading and Preston, and in South Australia, there was a hostel in Glenelg and Smithfield.

Initial stays in these migrant centers were short-lived with many Lao people leaving due to dissatisfaction with the food (22.6%) and a desire to move in with relatives and close friends in the community (54.8%). A quarter of Lao migrants left the centers in less than a month, and a further 39 percent left within 1–3 months. However, Lao people still perceived some benefits from their stay in the centers, including the ability to have paperwork processed which would allow them to integrate into Australian society (33.9%) and access to English-language classes (9.7%).

Lao people and other Indochinese ethnic groups chose to form enclaves in the Fairfield LGA nearby the migrant centers to be close to their relatives and friends. This allowed Lao people with low English proficiency levels to comfortably go about daily life without the obstacle of a language barrier impeding them. Other factors influencing the Lao people's decisions to settle in Fairfield LGA included the affordability of housing and proximity to their children's schools. For Lao people who chose to live in the Western suburbs outside of the Fairfeld Municipality, the dominant factor influencing this decision was a desire to be closer to their job.

=== Settlement of Lao people in Australia, 1990s ===
In the 1990s, the process of becoming an Australian citizen was less stringent compared to other countries which motivated Lao people to take up citizenship. In the US, the naturalization process required at least five years of permanent residence in the country, whereas the Citizenship Act in Australia allowed immigrants to become citizens with only two years of residence in the country provided they had basic English proficiency skills. In 1984, the act was amended to provide exemption to individuals over 50 applying for citizenship, recognizing the difficulty for older individuals in learning English. The majority of Lao people who settled in Australia attained citizenship within their first three years in the country. More than three quarters of Lao refugees became Australian citizens from 1975 to the 1990s, compared to 65 percent of Cambodians and 63 percent of Vietnamese refugees.

==== Impact of settlement on Lao family structure ====
Relations between Lao women and their spouses were markedly impacted upon migration to Australia, with 95 percent of Lao refugees stating their relationship with their husband or wife had changed since coming to Australia. Many women who were designated housewives in Laos had to join the Australian workforce as relying on a single source of income from the husband was insufficient for the cost of living in Australia. Gender dynamics shifted to more evenly distribute household labour amongst men and women - Lao women stated that their husbands had taken up more household duties in comparison to back home in Lao where typically the patriarch of the household would finish work and spend the rest of their leisurely time drinking with friends. However, a challenge faced by some Lao women was the threat of domestic violence, which made recently arrived migrants particularly vulnerable due to their lack of support system. Back in Lao, violence in the home was typically prevented or minimised through intervention by family and friends, however in Australia, this was not an option for some Lao women. Factors contributing to the propensity for Lao men to become violent upon migration to Australia included stress and trauma from the migration experience and financial-related pressures.

==== Employment in Australia ====
In the 1970s, a third of Lao people secured employment through connections with friends and relatives, with many jobs concentrating in the manufacturing industry. A smaller proportion (28.2%) of Lao-Australians stated they utilized resources provided by migrant centers to secure jobs including the assistance of Employment Officers. For unemployed Lao people looking for work, low levels of English proficiency (85.7%) were the dominant obstacle that preventing them from finding employment followed by a lack of job vacancies (42.9%). During the 1990s, Lao women typically worked in factories along with Lao men, although some men worked as janitors, gardeners or in construction.

==== Educational experiences ====
Many Lao children faced language barriers in educational settings and reportedly took twice as long to complete homework compared to Australian children. Despite these challenges, Lao children rapidly integrated into Australian society and began to adopt Western values over Lao traditions. Lao children became less likely to wholly obey their parent's wishes as was tradition in Laos. The assimilation of Lao youth into Australian culture was named a source of conflict with their parents, who expressed concern with their children dating and attending school functions and parties as was commonplace in Australia.

== Cultural differences ==
In Australia, birthdays are often celebrated by Lao people as is commonplace in Western tradition, however this practice is less frequent in Lao. Traditionally, Lao culture is not as patriarchal as other Asian cultures, although women are still expected to be subservient and docile. Many Lao women are afforded some independence and even more so for Lao-Australian women. For example, most women in Lao would take on their spouse's last name however in Australia many women do not follow this tradition and instead choose to keep their own family name. Another tradition followed by women in Lao that is seldom practiced in Australia includes going to sleep after her spouse. However, other practices indicating the subservience of Lao women to men include washing her husband's laundry separately to her own, which was still followed by some women in a 1990 study.

In Lao culture, respect for one's elders is a dominant value as influenced by Confucianism, and deems that younger people or individuals deemed of lower status, show deference to their elder/superior. Lao men and women use formal speech to address their elders in a manner which if translated to English would come off artificial. Conversely, Lao people in Australia may not be used to including polite phrases like 'Please' and 'Thank you' when speaking English as such terms are not commonly used in the Lao language.

== Organisations ==
Organisations established by Laotians in Australia include the Lao Studies Society, the Council of Overseas Lao, the Lao Patthin Association, LaoAus Care Inc. and the Lao Women's Association. The leadership of these organisations is largely drawn from among the civil servants of the pre-communist government of Laos, as well as the international students who were sponsored to come to Australia under the Colombo Plan during that government.

Other organisations include the Lao-Australian Welfare Association based in Forest Hill, VIC and the Lao Australian Society which advocates for the development of Lao culture in the country. Additionally, the Laotian Language Program operated by SBS Radio caters to the Lao community and is run on Mondays from 4-5pm and Saturdays at 9-10pm.

== Religion ==
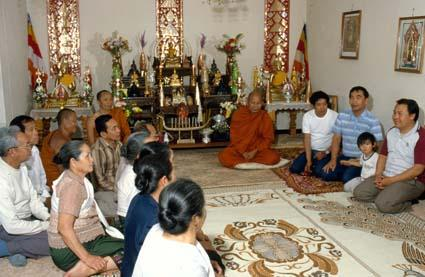
Group of Lao people and monks at a religious ceremony in Sydney

Most Laotians (over 70%) in Australia are Theravada Buddhists, with a minority of Catholics. There are several main temples frequented by the Lao in Australia, including Wat Phrayortkeo Dhammayanaram located in Edensor Park, NSW and Wat Buddhalavarn in Wedderburn, NSW. In Victoria, major Lao temples include the Lao Buddhist Temple of Victoria, also known as Wat Dhammanivesaya.

Buddhist temples serve not only as a religious structure but also a community meeting place for Lao-Australians. Major festivals in Lao culture are held at major Buddhist temples including the Lao New Year (also known as Pi Mai or Songkran) celebrations which takes place in mid-April. Water-throwing is a dominant activity during the festivities and is a means of wishing good fortune on others.

== See also ==
- Asian Australians
