= Inside Film Awards =

Australian film industry awards

The IF Awards, formerly known as the Inside Film Awards, Lexus Inside Film Awards, Kodak IF Awards, and Jameson IF Awards, was an annual awards ceremony and broadcast platform for the Australian film industry. Its name derives from its origins at Inside Film magazine, and changed over the years under different sponsorship. The event was held in Sydney in November each year, apart from between 2006 and 2008, when for three years it was held on the Gold Coast in Queensland. The last awards event was held in 2011.

== History ==
The Inside Film Awards were created by the founders of Inside Film magazine, Stephen Jenner and David Barda, The awards were determined by a national audience poll, which differentiated it from the Australian AACTA Awards, which are judged by industry professionals.

The IF Awards were first held in 1999, and until 2006 were also known as the Lexus Inside Film Awards, in recognition of its principal sponsor Lexus. The event was held in Sydney in November each year, and was broadcast on SBS Television and Showtime Movie Channels. Guests over this period included Nicole Kidman, Laurence Fishburne, Baz Luhrmann, Toni Collette, Geoffrey Rush, Jacqueline McKenzie, and Bryan Brown.

In 2007, the Rising Talent and Indy Spirit Awards were open to public entries.

Event partners changed over the years. In 2006, the event moved from Sydney to the Gold Coast Convention and Exhibition Centre in Gold Coast, Queensland, after a contract was signed with the Queensland Government. At that time, Angie Fielder was the general manager of Inside Film Awards. In 2008, the promotional trailer for the event was directed by Bonnie Elliott. In that year, the event was hosted by Julia Zemiro at the Royal Pines Resort on the Gold Coast, with Yumi Stynes welcoming the stars. Kate Miller-Heidke performed an acoustic version of her hit song "Can't Shake It" at the event, which was broadcast live on SBS TV.

In 2009, Kodak acquired naming rights for the awards, maintaining the partnership until 2010. Returning to Sydney, the event was variously known as the Kodak Inside Film Awards Sydney, Kodak IF Awards Sydney, or just Kodak IF Awards. Other partners in 2010 included GHD, Jameson Irish Whiskey, M.A.C. Cosmetics, OK! Magazine, SBS Television, and Screen Australia, among others.

In 2011 Jameson Irish Whiskey acquired naming rights, with the event held at Luna Park. Eddie Perfect hosted the event, with presenters including Callan McAuliffe, Richard Roxburgh, David Wenham, Sophie Lowe, Dan Wyllie, and Xavier Samuel. Individual awards were named after various sponsors, such as Showtime IF Award for Best Feature Film; Destination NSW IF Award for Best Actor; Dinosaur Designs IF Award for Best Actress; Fox Studios Australia IF Award for Best Direction; AVID IF Award for Best Editing; Dyson IF Award for Best Production Design; ARRI IF Award for Best Cinematography; South Australian Film Corporation IF Award for Best Sound; and many others. The IF Awards for Best Music, Best Script, Best Film Festival, and Best Short Animation were not named. The lifetime achievement award was called the Jameson Living Legend IF Award.

In April 2012, it was announced that the IF Awards would be put "on hold", owing to changing economic circumstances, and competition with the AACTA Awards, which had moved to Sydney in 2011. Living Legend award recipient, film critic Margaret Pomeranz, said about the loss of the awards: "It's a tragedy. They were wonderfully different, focussing not only on our film successes but on emerging talent like Andrew Dominik, Kath Shelper, Ryan Corr, and Anthony Maras. They were irreverent when necessary but also a lovely reflection of Australian audiences' engagement with our films. And it was always the best party in town!".

== Categories ==
The IF Awards included, among others, the following categories over the years:

- Contribution to Television
- Independent Spirit
- Best Unproduced Screenplay
- Living Legend
- Best Animation
- Best Feature Film
- Best Script

== Nominations and winners ==
=== 2007 nominees ===
The nominees in 2007 were:

IF Award for Best Feature Film

- The Home Song Stories – directed by Tony Ayres and produced by Michael McMahon & Liz Watts
- The Jammed – directed by Dee McLachlan and produced by Sally Ayre-Smith, Andrea Buck & Dee McLachlan
- Lucky Miles – directed by Michael James Rowland and produced by Jo Dyer & Lesley Dyer

Animal Logic IF Award for Best Director

- Tony Ayres – The Home Song Stories
- Matthew Saville – Noise
- Kriv Stenders – Boxing Day

Queensland Events Corporation IF Award for Best Actor

- Brendan Cowell – Noise
- Richard Green – Boxing Day
- Joel Lok – The Home Song Stories

InStyle IF Award for Best Actress

- Brenda Blethyn – Clubland
- Joan Chen – The Home Song Stories
- Veronica Sywak – The Jammed

Kodak IF Award for Best Cinematography

- The Home Song Stories – Nigel Bluck
- The Jammed – Peter Falk
- Lucky Miles – Geoff Burton, ASC

IF Award for Best Music

- The Home Song Stories – Antony Partos
- The Jammed – Grant Innes McLachlan
- Noise – Bryony Marks

Australian Film Commission IF Award for Best Script

- The Jammed – Dee McLachlan
- The Home Song Stories – Tony Ayres
- Lucky Miles – Michael James Rowland & Helen Barnes

Holding Redlich IF Award for Best Short Film

- Crocodile Dreaming – directed by Darlene Johnson & produced by Sue Milliken
- Nana – directed by Warwick Thornton & produced by Kath Shelper
- Soul Mates – directed by Naomi Rossdeutscher & produced by Rachel Clements and Paul Howard

Lab Sydney IF Award for Best Short Animation

- The Goat That Ate Time – directed & produced by Lucinda Schreiber
- Richard – directed & produced by Mick Elliott
- Sweet & Sour – directed by Eddie White & produced by Sam White and The People's Republic of Animation

SBS IF Award for Best Short Documentary

- Flour, Sugar, Tea – directed by Lee Willis & produced by Gina Twyble
- My Brother Vinnie – directed by Steven McGregor & produced by Sarah Bond
- Nigger Lovers – directed by Rhonda Hagan & produced by Daryl Sparkes & Stephen Hagan

IF Award for Best Documentary

- Bomb Harvest – directed by Kim Mordaunt & produced by Sylvia Wilczynski
- 4 – directed by Tim Slade & produced by Joanna Buggy
- Unlikely Travellers – directed by Michael Noonan & produced by Michael Noonan and John Hart

3 Mobile IF Award for Best Music Video

- God Told Me To – directed by Natasha Pincus. Artist: Paul Kelly
- Hearts a Mess – directed by Brendan Cook. Artist: Gotye
- I Thought About You – directed by Kiku Ohe. Artist: The Beautiful Girls

Production Book IF Award for Best Production Design

- Clubland – Nell Hanson
- The Home Song Stories – Melinda Doring
- Lucky Miles – Pete Baxter

Cutting Edge IF Award for Best Editing

- The Jammed – Anne Carter & Dee McLachlan
- Lucky Miles – Henry Dangar, ASE
- Noise – Geoff Hitchins

Zig Zag Lane IF Award for Best Sound

- Clubland – Liam Egan, Ian McLoughlin, Andrew Neil & Steven Jackson Vaughan
- The Home Song Stories – Craig Carter, John Wilkinson, James Harvey & Andrew Neil
- Noise – Emma Bortignon, Doron Kipen & Philippe Decrausaz

Independent Spirit IF Award

- Cross Life – Claire McCarthy
- Searching 4 Sandeep – Poppy Stockell
- Darling! The Pieter-Dirk Uys Story – Julian Shaw

Atlab IF Award for Rising Talent

- Philippa Campey
- Bonnie Elliott
- Ben Hackworth
- Erin White

ZTudio What IF? Award for Best Unproduced Screenplay

- The Adventures of Abigail Storm – Luke Preston
- The Farm – Peter Dai Evans
- Intersection – Robin de Crespigny

=== 2008 nominees and winners ===
(Winners in each category are listed first, with nominees in alphabetical order following):

Showtime IF Award for Best Feature Film

- MEN'S GROUP – Michael Joy & John L. Simpson
- The Black Balloon - Elissa Down & Tristram Miall
- Son of a Lion – Benjamin Gilmour & Carolyn Johnson

Screen Australia IF Award for Best Director

- PETER DUNCAN – Unfinished Sky
- Elissa Down – The Black Balloon
- Andrew Traucki & David Nerlich – Black Water

Queensland Events Corporation IF Award for Best Actor

- GRANT DODWELL – Men's Group
- Rhys Wakefield – The Black Balloon
- William McInnes – Unfinished Sky

IF Award for Best Actress

- MONIC HENDRICKX – Unfinished Sky
- Gemma Ward – The Black Balloon
- Maeve Dermody – Black Water

Screen Australia IF Award for Best Script

- MEN'S GROUP – Michael Joy & John L. Simpson
- The Black Balloon – Elissa Down & Jimmy The Exploder
- Unfinished Sky – Peter Duncan

Sony IF Award for Best Cinematography

- JULES O’LOUGHLIN ACS – September
- Denson Baker ACS – The Black Balloon
- Robert Humphreys ACS – Unfinished Sky

Dinosaur Designs IF Award for Best Music

- AMANDA BROWN – Son of a Lion
- Michael Yezerski – The Black Balloon
- Haydn Walker – Men's Group

Cutting Edge IF Award for Best Editing

- SURESH AYYAR – Unfinished Sky
- Veronika Jenet ASE – The Black Balloon
- Rodrigo Balart – Black Water

Production Book IF Award for Best Production Design

- LAURIE FAEN – Unfinished Sky
- Nicholas McCallum – The Black Balloon
- Sam Hobbs – September

Zig Zag Lane IF Award for Best Sound

- SAM PETTY, ROB MACKENZIE, YULIA AKERHOLT, PETER GRACE & MICHAEL MCMENOMY – The Square
- Paul Pirola & Ben Osmo – The Black Balloon
- Andrew Plain, Annie Breslin, Will Ward & John Scheifelbein – Unfinished Sky

IF Award for Box Office Achievement

- The Black Balloon

SBS IF Award for Best Documentary

- THE BURNING SEASON – Cathy Henkel (director/producer), Jeff Canin (producer) & Trish Lake (producer)
- The Oasis – Ian Darling (director/producer) & Sascha Ettinger Epstein (director)
- Playing in the Shadows – Sascha Ettinger Epstein (director/producer) & Marco Ianniello (director/producer)

St Arnou IF Award for Best Short Documentary

- UNDRESSING VANESSA – Matthew Pond (director) & Tina Lymberis (producer)
- Mad Morro – Kelrick Martin (director) & Tom Zubrycki (producer)
- Rare Chicken Rescue – Randall Wood (director) & Vickie Gest (producer)

Holding Redlich IF Award for Best Short Film

- fOUR – Erin White (director) & Zyra McAuliffe (producer)
- Spider – Nash Edgerton (director) & Nicole O'Donohue (producer)
- You Better Watch Out – Steve Callen (director) & Jules Callen (producer)

Autodesk IF Award for Best Short Animation

- THE COVENANT OF MR KASCH – Joshua Beahan (director/producer) & Ruwan De Silva (director/producer)
- Dog with Electric Collar – Steve Baker (director) & Damon Escott (producer)
- Mutt – Glen Hunwick (director) & Beth Frey (producer)

3 Mobile IF Award for Best Music Video

- JUST A BOY by Angus & Julia Stone – Angus & Julia Stone (directors), Josh Groom (director), Andrew Yoole (director), Madeleine Milasas (producer) & Jodie Passmore (producer)
- Emergency! Emergency! by The Hot Lies – Luke Eve (director) & Simon Ritch (producer)
- If You Keep Losing Sleep by Silverchair – Stephen Lance (director), Damon Escott (director) & Leanne Tonkes (producer)

ZTudio What IF? Award for Best Unproduced Screenplay

- MEMORIAL DAY – Kieran Darcy-Smith
- Get Black – Matthew C Vaughan
- Red Light Revolution – Sam Voutas

EFILM IF Award for Rising Talent

- LEON FORD
- Amy Gebhardt
- Cris Jones

Post Op Group IF Award for Independent Spirit

- BENJAMIN GILMOUR & CAROLYN JOHNSON – Son of a Lion
- Jason Byrne – Rats & Cats
- Christopher Weekes – Bitter & Twisted

V Australia IF Award for Living Legend

- Hugo Weaving

Inside Film Magazine IF Award for Festival of the Year

- Flickerfest International Film Festival

=== 2010 winners ===
The winners of the 2010 Kodak IF Awards were:

Autodesk IF Award for Best Short Animation

- The Lost Thing – Directors: Shaun Tan, Andrew Ruhemann, Producer: Sophie Byrne

Holding Redlich IF Award for Best Short Film

- Celestial Avenue – Directors: Colin & Cameron Cairnes, Producer: Scott Alexander

FACB IF Award for Best Short Documentary

- From Dope to Dalai Lama – Director: Jason Raftopoulos, Producer: Jason Raftopoulos

SBS Best Documentary IF Award

- Strange Birds in Paradise – Director: Charlie Hill-Smith, Producer: Jamie Nicolai, John Cherry

SAE Institute IF Award for Best Music Video

- "Big Jet Plane" – Angus & Julia Stone – Director: Kiku Ohe, Producer: Richard Halstead

AFTRS IF Award for Best Direction

- Animal Kingdom – David Michôd

Jameson IF Award for Best Script

- Tomorrow, When the War Began – Stuart Beattie

Events NSW IF Award for Best Actor

- Animal Kingdom – Ben Mendelsohn

IF Award for Best Actress

- Tomorrow, When the War Began – Caitlin Stasey

Showtime Movie Channels IF Award for Best Feature Film

- Tomorrow, When the War Began

SA FILM IF Award for Best Sound

- Beneath Hill 60 – Robert Sullivan, Liam Egan, Mark Cornish, Tony Murtagh

Dinosaur Designs IF Award for Best Music

- Tomorrow, When the War Began – Johnny Klimek, Reinhold Heil

CineAlta by Sony IF Award for Best Cinematography

- The Waiting City – Denson Baker

Dyson IF Award for Best Production Design

- Bright Star – Janet Patterson

AVID IF Award for Best Editing

- The Waiting City – Veronika Jenet

National Film and Sound Archive Independent Spirit IF Award

- Caught Inside – Directed by Adam Blaiklock, Produced by Paul S Friedman

EFilm IF Award for Rising Talent

- Ariel Kleiman

Media Super Out of the Box IF Award

- Ryan Corr

Docklands Studios Melbourne IF Award for Contribution to TV

- Penny Chapman

== 2011 ==
In 2011, My Tehran for Sale, the debut feature by Iranian-Australian filmmaker Granaz Moussavi, won the Independent Spirit IF Award.
