= 50th Australian Film Institute Awards nominees and winners =

The nominees for the 50th Australian Film Institute Awards were announced in Sydney, Australia, on 29 October 2008. The nominees for Best Documentary, Best Short Fiction Film, and Best Short Animation were announced on 7 August 2008.

== Feature Film Awards ==
=== Best Film ===
- The Black Balloon
- The Jammed
- The Square
- Unfinished Sky

=== Best Actor ===
- Guy Pearce – Death Defying Acts
- Rhys Wakefield – The Black Balloon
- David Roberts – The Square
- William McInnes – Unfinished Sky

=== Best Actress ===
- Emma Lung – The Jammed
- Noni Hazlehurst – Bitter & Twisted
- Monic Hendrickx – Unfinished Sky
- Veronica Sywak – The Jammed

=== Best Supporting Actor ===
- Luke Ford – The Black Balloon
- Erik Thomson – The Black Balloon
- Anthony Hayes – The Square
- Joel Edgerton – The Square

== Non-Feature Awards ==
=== Best Documentary ===
- Beyond Our Ken
- Not Quite Hollywood
- The Oasis
- Rare Chicken Rescue

=== Best Short Animation ===
- Chainsaw
- Dog With Electric Collar
- Mutt
- PaperCityArchitects

=== Best Short Fiction ===
- Four
- The Ground Beneath
- Jerrycan
- My Rabbit Hoppy

== Controversies and comments ==
=== AFI Website "contenders" ===
On the website of the Australian Film Institute, it listed 25 expected nominees for the Best Film category. The 25 contenders were:

- All My Friends Are Leaving Brisbane
- Bitter and Twisted
- Black Water
- Cactus
- Children of the Silk Road
- Death Defying Acts
- Five Moments of Infidelity
- Gabriel
- Green Fire Envy
- Hey, Hey, It's Esther Blueburger
- Men's Group
- Punishment
- Rats and Cats
- Salvation
- September
- Ten Empty
- The Black Balloon
- The Independent
- The Jammed
- The Plex
- The Square
- The Tender Hook
- The Tragedy of Hamlet Prince of Denmark
- Three Blind Mice
- Unfinished Sky
