= Sachin Joab =

Australian actor

- Born: Melbourne, Victoria, Australia
- Occupation: Actor
- Years active: 2002–present
- Website: www.sachinjoab.com

Sachin Joab is an Australian actor. He took an interest in acting during primary school and attended various acting schools and workshops. Since graduating from the National Theatre, Joab has appeared in several films and television, including City Homicide, Rush, My Year Without Sex, 10 Terrorists, and Conspiracy 365. In 2011, Joab successfully auditioned for the recurring role of Ajay Kapoor in the soap opera Neighbours. He was later promoted to the main cast. Joab left the show in May 2013. The actor has since appeared in SBS miniseries Better Man, feature films Lion (2016) and Hotel Mumbai (2018), and television series Pine Gap, The Hunting, Upright, and Jack Irish.

== Early life ==
Joab was born in Melbourne, Victoria. His parents divorced when he was five years old. Joab became interested in acting during primary school when he was around seven or eight. He told Tanu Kallivayalil from the Indus Age, "My parents like a lot of Indian parents wanted me to do something credible. But I did not want to become a lawyer or doctor or something like that. I wanted to do something that I was passionate about. In fact, I just finished high school because I did not want to make my mum sad."

Joab then attended various acting schools and workshops, before he moved to New York to study at the Actors Studio. Joab, who spent his childhood imitating the voices of characters he watched on television, did not need to undergo accent training. On his return to Australia, Joab joined the National Theatre, graduating three years later. He then began appearing in films and theatre productions, before being signed to an agent.

== Career ==
In 2008, Joab made a guest appearance as Raj in the City Homicide episode "Examination Day". Joab had to put on an Indian accent for the part. The following year, he appeared in an episode of Rush and in the film My Year Without Sex. 2011 saw Joab cast in Big Mamma's Boy and Winston Furlong's Taj, alongside his future Neighbours co-star Coco Cherian. Joab was also cast as Judge Miki Miraj in Dee McLachlan's black comedy 10 Terrorists.

Joab joined the cast of Neighbours as Ajay Kapoor in 2011 following a successful audition. On 7 December 2011, it was announced that Joab had been promoted to the regular cast and his on-screen family were being introduced. Following the announcement, several racist posts left on the Neighbours website had to be removed. Speaking to Paul Tatnell from the Herald Sun, Joab blamed the racism on a "lack of education". He elaborated "There is various pockets that will say it is un-Australian to have an Indian or an Indian family on Ramsay St. Those Aussies who are saying it is un-Australian will be the same ones who pretty much supported the White Australia policy back in the day, you are never going to get away from that kind of stuff." Joab left Neighbours at the end of his contract in May 2013 to pursue acting work in Los Angeles.

In 2021, when actress Shareena Clanton revealed she had faced racism on the set of Neighbours, Joab, Remy Hii and Sharon Johal also made allegations about racism while they appeared on the show, which resulted in the production company launching an official investigation. In 2022, the investigation was closed and the findings were not made public. Joab revealed his displeasure at how the Kapoor family were written out and how they were subjected to the public's racism.

Joab starred in the twelve-part series Conspiracy 365 as Bruno in 2012. He also appeared as Inspector Ramesh in the SBS four-part miniseries Better Man, which began airing from 25 July 2013. That same year, he filmed a role in the 2014 film The Legend Maker. Joab made a guest appearance in US series Perception, followed by a role in Childhood's End in 2015. He was also cast in the drama film Lion, alongside Rooney Mara and Dev Patel. In April 2016, Joab spoke out about having to put on an Indian accent when he attends auditions in Australia. That same year, Joab played the lead role of Amir Kapoor in the Sydney Theatre Company (STC) production of Disgraced. He was invited to audition for the part after the STC director of programming saw him on Neighbours.

Joab starred in the 2018 political thriller series Pine Gap, which was broadcast on Netflix and ABC. That same year, he guested in Romper Stomper, and had a supporting role on Jack Irish. He also appeared in the feature films Upgrade directed by Leigh Whannell, and Hotel Mumbai, alongside his Lion co-star Dev Patel. In 2019, Joab appeared in the four-part SBS drama The Hunting, starring Asher Keddie and Richard Roxburgh. He also appeared in Tim Minchin's Upright. In 2021, Joab guested in the ABC TV anthology series Fires, and the Paramount+ comedy Spreadsheet. He went on to appear in Irreverent and Safe Home.

On 21 November 2023, Sean Slatter of IF Magazine reported that Joab had been appointed to the board of the National Film and Sound Archive. In 2024, Joab was named as part of the cast of the upcoming Australian series Population 11. Joab was also named as part of the extended cast of the Channel 9 drama Human Error.

== Filmography ==
Television performances
Year	Title	Role	Notes
2008	City Homicide	Raj	Episode: "Examination Day"
2009	Rush	Kaushal	Episode: "2.11"
2011–2013	Neighbours	Ajay Kapoor	Series regular
2012	Conspiracy 365	Bruno	Recurring role
2013	Better Man	Inspector Ramesh	Episode: "Twin Dragons"
2014	Fat Tony & Co.	Jesse Franco	Episode: "The Mexican Job"
2014	Perception	Ravi Singh	Episode: "Bolero"
2015	Childhood's End	NBC Reporter	Episode: "The Overlords"
2017	Dirty, Clean, & Inbetween	Randall Randallini	Television film
2017	Sisters	Rik	Episode: "#1.1"
2018	Romper Stomper	Sharif	Episode: "The Dark Heart of Things"
2018	Jack Irish	Ajeet Agarwal	Recurring role
2018	The Cry	Kris	Episode: "#1.2"
2018	Pine Gap	Simon Penny	Miniseries
2019	Harrow	Robert Chaudhari	Episode: "Aegri Somnia"
2019	Reef Break	Duke Kalama	Episode: "The Green Tide"
2019	The Hunting	Sandeep	SBS TV mini-series
2019	Upright	Dr. Kashani	Episode: "Day Two"
2021	Wentworth	Dr. Vince Ghosh	Episode: "Judas Kiss"
2021	Fires	Saikat Biswas	Episode: "#1.3"
2021	Spreadsheet	Brett	Episode: Three Shags and Call Me Christ
2022	Irreverent	Sergeant Rahane	Recurring role
2023	Safe Home	Luke	Episodes: "#1.2", "1.4"
2024	Population 11	Petey P	Episodes 5-8, 10-12
2024	Human Error	Mike Simpson	TV series

Film performances
Year	Title	Role	Notes
2008	Tala	Vupen	Short film
2009	My Year Without Sex	Rohit	
2011	Everyone's Children	Tony	Short film
2011	Taj	Harish	
2011	Big Mamma's Boy	Bolly	
2012	10 Terrorists	Judge Miki Miraj	
2014	In Between	Juan	Short film
2014	The Legend Maker		
2015	Reversion	James Treloar	
2015	Road Hard	George	
2016	Lion	Bharat	
2016	You Deserve Everything	Doctor Edwards	Short film
2018	Upgrade	Dr. Bhatia	
2018	Hotel Mumbai	Vijay	
