= Absinthe (show) =

Las Vegas variety show at Caesar's Palace

- Company: Spiegelworld
- Genre: Contemporary circus
- Show type: Resident show
- Date of premiere: 2006
- Location: Caesars Palace, Las Vegas

Creative team
- Writer and director: Wayne Harrison
- Producer: Ross Mollison
- Choreographer: Lucas Newland
- Official website

Absinthe is a live show that premiered in 2006 and is playing on the forecourt of Caesars Palace, Las Vegas, after opening on April 1, 2011. A contemporary circus, the show is described by Stage and Cinema as a "cross between terrific variety acts and a stag party." Absinthe has been described as part of the burlesque revival in Las Vegas by USA Today. It has been called "The Greatest Show In Vegas History" by Las Vegas Weekly.

The show is hosted by the character The Gazillionaire, originally played by former Cirque du Soleil clown Voki Kalfayan. His original assistant (2006-2015), Penny Pibbets was portrayed by actress Anais Thomassian. In 2015 the character Joy Jenkins was introduced, "a kewpie doll-goofy sidekick inspired by Moe of The Three Stooges." Developed and played by the American clown Jet Eveleth, "who masterminds the show. Joy is truly the heart of the show."

== Background ==
Originally, Absinthe was supposed to open at the Fontainebleau Las Vegas, a proposed resort which was later postponed due to financial problems. Instead, the show opened at Caesars Palace, which allowed the producers to set up a temporary tent at the Roman Plaza. Within 90 days of performances, after inspections by Las Vegas Fire & Rescue, the organizers were told to shut down production. Due to the success of the shows within those 90 days, Gary Selesner, president of Caesars Palace, purchased a Spiegeltent.

The show is directed by Wayne Harrison with original choreography by Lucas Newland. It is produced by Ross Mollison and owned by Spiegelworld.

Performances are 90 minutes long and take place in a 750 capacity spiegeltent on a stage that is only nine feet (two point seven metres) in diameter. Audience members sit in a circle around the stage.

== Reception ==
In 2011, it was named "Best New Show" by Vegas Seven Magazine. Northwest Indiana Times writer Philip Potempa acknowledges the "all-so-amazing" performers, comparing Melody Sweets to the character of the Green Fairy played by Kylie Minogue in the 2001 film Moulin Rouge! Paul Carr of The Huffington Post proclaimed "If I could only see one show my entire life," he said, "I'd want it to be that."

Celebrities who have attended performances of Absinthe include Gerard Butler, Daniel Radcliffe, Lacey Chabert, Kaley Cuoco, Channing Tatum, James Franco, Giada De Laurentiis, Neil Patrick Harris and Olivia Newton-John.
