= Grant Dodwell =

Australian actor

- Born: Grant Radnor Dodwell; Sydney, New South Wales, Australia
- Education: National Institute of Dramatic Art (1971)
- Occupations: Actor; producer; writer; director; voice artist; drama teacher
- Years active: 1971–present
- Known for: A Country Practice (1981–1986) as Dr. Simon Bowen
- Children: Celeste Dodwell

Grant Radnor Dodwell is an Australian actor, producer, writer, director, voice artist, and drama teacher. He is best known for his roles in television soap operas including as an original cast member in A Country Practice, Willing and Abel and Home and Away.

== Early life ==
Dodwell studied acting at Sydney's National Institute of Dramatic Art in 1971.

== Career ==
Dodwell appeared as Dr. Sam Wilkinson in The Young Doctors in 1980. He is best known for his role playing Dr. Simon Bowen in soap opera A Country Practice, opposite Penny Cook from 1981 to 1986. He was a triple recipient of the Silver Logie for Most Popular Actor for the role, which he received consecutively from 1984 to 1986.

Dodwell later played Charles Willing in the comedy series Willing and Abel (1987), in which he co-starred with his former A Country Practice co-star Shane Withington, who played the role of Abel Moore, and Rebecca Rigg, who played Angela Reddy.

In 1992, Dodwell played Leo Riener in the 1992 miniseries Good Vibrations. In 1996, he featured in the recurring role of Dr. James McLaren in the long-running soap opera Home and Away. In 2011, he also played the guest role of Gary O'Connor in the series.

Dodwell has made guest appearances in Homicide, Glenview High, Father, Dear Father in Australia, Skyways G.P., The Girl from Tomorrow, Heartbreak High, Pacific Drive Roar, Fallen Angels, Medivac, Water Rats, Rescue Special Ops and Packed to the Rafters.

Dodwell has appeared in films, including Cathy's Child (1979) with Bryan Brown, Goodbye Paradise (1983) alongside Ray Barrett, Cops and Robbers (1993) and The Pact (2003). He also performed in the TV movies Cass (1978) and The Distant Home (1992). In 2008, he worked on the feature film Men's Group, produced by John L. Simpson and directed by Michael Joy. He won the Australian IF Best Actor Award and the film won Best Film and Script.

After A Country Practice, Dodwell resumed his theatre career, including a national tour of Noises Off. He appeared with Hugh Jackman in a production of Sunset Boulevard. When theatre roles and television guest roles no longer provided a sufficient income, Dodwell focussed on corporate theatre and videos.

After filming a live performance of the play Codgers Dodwell co-founded Australian Theatre Live in 2016, advocating for younger generations to have affordable access to theatre. Their first production, Liberty Equality Fraternity screened in cinemas in 2016. Other productions have included David Williamson's Emerald City, STC's Wharf Revue, Rumpelstiltskin, The Dapto Chaser and a STC/Malthouse Theatre production of Michael Gow's Away.

== Personal life ==
Dodwell is married to Sian Dodwell, a shoe designer who worked on the Australian production of Billy Elliot. The couple's daughter, Celeste Dodwell, is also an actor, who scored a role on Home and Away immediately after finishing high school.

== Filmography ==
=== Film ===
Year	Title	Role	Notes
1979	Cathy's Child	Hot Line Journalist	
1983	Goodbye Paradise	Seaworld Boy	
1994	Cops and Robbers	John	
2003	The Pact	Officer Clem	
2008	Men's Group	Alex	
2009	Dear Diary	Charlie	Short film

=== Television ===
Year	Title	Role	Notes
1977	Homicide	Pratt	Season 1, episode 508
1977	Glenview High		Season 1, episode 8
1978	Cass		TV movie
1978	Father, Dear Father in Australia	Ronnie	Season 1, episode 5
1979	Skyways	Clive Simpson	Season 1, episode 151
1980	The Young Doctors	Dr. Sam Wilkinson	
1981–1986	A Country Practice	Dr. Simon Bowen	331 episodes
1987	Willing and Abel	Charles Willing	
1991	G.P.	Evan Lucas	Season 3, episode 17
1992	Good Vibrations	Leo Reiner	Miniseries
1992	The Distant Home	Jim Harrison	TV movie
1992	The Girl from Tomorrow	Mark Johnson	3 episodes
1995	Heartbreak High	Jerry Shapiro	Season 2, episode 9
1996	Pacific Drive		
1996	Home and Away	Dr. James McLaren	Recurring role
1997	Roar	Cormac	Season 1, episode 10
1997	Fallen Angels	Paul	Season 1, episode 7
1998	Medivac	Paul	Season 3, episode 12
2000	Water Rats	Lloyd Tully	Season 5, episode 16
2009	Rescue Special Ops	Lance Foster	Season 1, episode 5
2010	Packed to the Rafters	Doug	2 episodes
2011	Home and Away	Gary O'Connor	Guest role

== Theatre ==
=== As actor ===
Year	Title	Role	Notes
1971	The Trial of Lucullus	Herald / Jury of the Dead	NIDA Theatre, Sydney
1971	The Diary of Anne Frank	Mr Dussel	UNSW Old Tote Theatre, Sydney
1971	You Can't Take It With You	Henderson / J-Man	UNSW Old Tote Theatre, Sydney
1971	Lady Windermere's Fan	Lord Darlington	NIDA Theatre, Sydney
1972	The Man, the Spirit Fish and the Rainbow Snake		QLD schools tour with QTC
1972	The Badly Behaved Bunyip		QLD schools tour with QTC
1972	Twelfth Night	Second Officer	SGIO Theatre, Brisbane with QTC
1972	The Ruling Class		SGIO Theatre, Brisbane with QTC
1972	You're a Good Man, Charlie Brown	Schroeder	QLD regional tour with QTC & Harry M. Miller
1973	The National Health or Nurse Norton's Affair		SGIO Theatre, Brisbane with QTC
1973	The Imaginary Invalid	Dr. Purgon	SGIO Theatre, Brisbane with QTC
1974	Godspell		His Majesty's Theatre, Perth with J. C. Williamson's
1977	The Alchemist	Officer	UNSW Old Tote Theatre, Sydney
1978	The RSL Show		Whitehorse Pub Theatre, Sydney
1988	The Mighty 1978 RSL Talent Quest		Whitehorse Pub Theatre, Sydney
1978	The Edna Lint Story		Whitehorse Pub Theatre, Sydney
1978	Done to Death		Whitehorse Pub Theatre, Sydney
1978	The Knack	Tolen	UNSW Old Tote Theatre, Sydney
1980	The Collected Works of Billy the Kid	Reporter	Cell Block Theatre, Sydney with Ian Tasker and Associates
1986	Everybody Makes Mistakes		Darwin, Hobart, Launceston, Gold Coast casinos tour
1987; 1988	See How They Run	Clive	Northside Theatre, Sydney, Marian Street Theatre, Sydney
1988	The Sentimental Bloke	Ginger Mick	Parramatta Cultural Centre with Q Theatre Company
1988	Relatively Speaking	Greg	Seymour Centre, Sydney tour
1988	Love Off the Shelf	John	Universal Theatre, Melbourne
1989; 1990	Anything Goes	Lord Evelyn Oakleigh	State Theatre, Sydney, Lyric Theatre, Brisbane, State Theatre, Melbourne, Adelaide Festival Centre, Aotea Centre, Auckland
1990; 1991	Noises Off		Glen St Theatre, Sydney, Twelfth Night Theatre, Brisbane, Gold Coast Arts Centre with Theatre of Comedy
1991; 1992	Charley's Aunt		Sydney Opera House, Suncorp Theatre, Brisbane, Illawarra Performing Arts Centre, Laycock St Theatre, Gosford
1992	Love Letters	Andrew Makepeace III	Tasmania tour with Mummers Theatre Company
1992	Sons of Cain		Playhouse, Newcastle with Hunter Valley Theatre Company
1993	Taking Steps		Playhouse, Adelaide with STCSA
1993; 1994	A Bedfull of Foreigners		West End Rialto, Brisbane, Seymour Centre, Sydney, Playhouse, Adelaide, Newcastle Civic Theatre, Canberra Theatre with Les Currie Productions
1994	Whispering Demons	David	Playhouse, Perth with Perth Theatre Company
1996	Sunset Boulevard		
1998	Third World Blues		Orange Civic Theatre, Canberra Theatre, IMB Theatre, Wollongong, Monash University, Melbourne, Geelong Arts Centre, Frankston Arts Centre, The Capital, Bendigo, West Gippsland Arts Centre, Theatre Royal, Hobart with STC
2010	Gwen in Purgatory	Laurie	Belvoir St Theatre, Sydney, Roundhouse Theatre, Brisbane with La Boite
2011	The Business	Michael	Belvoir St Theatre, Sydney

=== As director / producer ===
Year	Title	Role	Notes
	Codgers	Co-producer	
2019; 2020	The Wharf Revue: Celebrating 15 Years	Director	Byron Theatre & Online
2022	Norm and Ahmed	Producer	Riverside Theatres Parramatta & Online

== Awards ==
Year	Award	Category	Notes	Result
1984	Logie Award	Most Popular Actor	A Country Practice	Won
1985	Logie Award	Most Popular Lead Actor	A Country Practice	Won
1986	Logie Award	Most Popular Australian Actor	A Country Practice	Won
2008	IF Awards	Best Actor	Men's Group	Won
2009	Film Critics Circle of Australia Awards	Best Actor	Men's Group	Nominated
