= Shane Porteous =

Australian actor (born 1942)

- Born: John Shane Porteous; 17 August 1942 (age 83); Coleraine, Victoria, Australia
- Education: University of Queensland
- Occupations: Actor; screenwriter; animation layout artist; voice artist
- Years active: c.1960–present
- Known for: A Country Practice as Dr. Terence Elliot
- Notable work: Screenwriter for Neighbours and Home and Away

John Shane Porteous (born 17 August 1942) (known as Shane Porteous) is an Australian actor, screenwriter, animation layout artist and animation voice artist. As a screenwriter, he is sometimes credited as John Hanlon.

He remains best known for his role as in the TV serial A Country Practice, as Dr. Terence Elliot and original character and his ongoing role in TV series Pizza from 2000 until 2007. He has done numerous animation layouts and provided voice roles for feature film and shorts.

== Early life and education ==
Shane Porteous was born John Shane Porteous in Coleraine, Victoria on 17 August 1942, to pilot Stanley Porteous and his wife Pat.

He was raised in Queensland and attended the University of Queensland, graduating with a B.A. He was a member of the UQ Dramatic Society and performed with actors such as Jack Thompson and Michael Caton at the Avalon Theatre in 1965.

Porteous moved to Sydney in 1967.

== Career ==
Porteous is best known the television drama series A Country Practice as Dr. Elliot during its twelve-year run on the Seven Network (1981–93), a role for which he won the Silver Logie award in 1992. He has also won AWGIE Awards for his various scriptwriting projects. In the series he had various romances including Matron Marta Kurtesz (Helen Scott), Dr. Alex Fraser (Diane Smith) and Rosemary Prior (Maureen Edwards) who he married in the final episode.

Other TV credits include What For Marianne?, Catch Kandy, Homicide, Matlock Police, Certain Women (1973–76), The Box (1974), Number 96 (1977), Glenview High, Cop Shop, The Restless Years, Neighbours, Home and Away, Blue Heelers and Heartbreak High.

Porteous has performed in many stage plays, among them Hamlet, Death of a Salesman (1970), the Sydney Theatre Company's production of King Lear and Much Ado About Nothing. In June 2010 he completed a touring performance of Codgers with Ron Haddrick among others.

He was a regular at the Q Theatre in Penrith, New South Wales, and was also the ambassador for 'The Q', which was demolished in August 2005 and moved to the Joan Sutherland Performing Arts Centre.

As a television screenwriter he has written scripts for series including Neighbours and Home and Away, sometimes under the pseudonym of John Hanlon.

=== Animation ===
Porteous has also provided animation services to Hanna-Barbera, and has created layouts for the film versions of The Magic Pudding and Blinky Bill.

Shane was the voice of Sid the Seagull in the Cancer Council Victoria's Anti Skin Cancer advertising campaign "Slip-Slop-Slap".

== Popular culture ==
He is referenced in the popular Australian song "I'm So Post Modern" by the Bedroom Philosopher.

== Awards ==
Association	Honour	Year	Awarded for
Australian Government	Centenary Medal	2001	Contribution to Scriptwriting and the Performing Arts
Logie Awards	Silver Logie for Best Actor	1992	A Country Practice as Dr. Terence Elliot

== Filmography ==
=== Film ===
Year	Title	Role	Type
1979	The Little Convict	Jack Doolen (voice)	Animated film
1982	A Dangerous Summer	Sgt. Goodwin	Feature film
1982	Sarah and the Squirrel	Voice	Animated film
2003	Fat Pizza	Doctor	Feature film
2007	The Uncertainty Principle	Thomas	Short film
2011	Codgers	Rod Dean	Feature film

=== Television ===
Year	Title	Role	Type
1967–1968	Awful Movies with Deadly Earnest	Deadly Earnest	
1968	Contrabandits	Jock	
1971	Dynasty	Ken	
1971	What For Marianne?	Jon Wright	TV movie
1972	Quartet		Miniseries
1972; 1973	Homicide	John Ellis / George Bailey	
1972–1977	Number 96	Joshua	17 episodes
1973	Ryan	John Morris	
1973	Catch Kandy	Christian Faber	
1973	Serpent in the Rainbow	Phillip Lovett	Miniseries
1973	The Taming of the Shrew	Tranio	TV movie
1974	The Box	David Warner	
1975	Scobie Malone	Constable Clements	
1975	Matlock Police	Martin Phillips, Jamie, Pasquali, Jeff Forrest	
1975	Kings Man	Constable Ben Price	
1976	Certain Women	Peter Clayton	
1977–1978	Cop Shop	Ron Keating / Jason Knight	
1978	Bobby Dazzler	Sergio	
1978	Glenview High	Dr. Green	
1978	Puzzle	Rant	TV movie
1979	Chopper Squad	Duffy	
1979	The Restless Years	Andrew Nelson	
1979	Off on a Comet	Voice	
1979	From the Earth to the Moon	Voice artist	Animated TV movie
1980	Skyways	John Dormany	
1981	Bellamy	Walt	
1981–1993	A Country Practice	Dr. Terence Elliot	
1995	Neighbours	Patrick Kratz	
1997	Heartbreak High	Jumpin Jack Jet	
2000–2007	Pizza	Doctor / Registrar	
2001	Wicked!	Voice	Animated series
2001–2011	Home and Away	Jim Tyler, Douglass Graham	
2005	Blue Heelers	John Maguire	
2007	Constructing Australia	JD Fitzgerald	Documentary
2019	Smoke Between Trees	Darren	
2023	Munro		Miniseries

== Theatre ==
Year	Title	Role	Notes	Ref
	Hamlet			
1962	Fairy Tales of New York		The Old Dolphin Theatre	
1969	The Proposal		AMP Theatrette	
1969	Little Murder		UNSW	
1969	Rosencrantz and Guildenstern Are Dead		Theatre Royal, Hobart	
1970	Sganarelle		New South Wales	
1970	Death of a Salesman		UNSW	
1970	Major Barbara		UNSW, Canberra Theatre	
1970	King Oedipus		Canberra Theatre, UNSW Old Tote Theatre Company	
1970	Dick Whittington		UNSW	
1971	Hank's Night		AMP Theatrette	
1971	The Night Thoreau Spent in Jail		Ensemble Theatre, Sydney	
1971	Home Free!		AMP Theatrette	
1973–1974	What If You Died Tomorrow?	Andrew	Sydney Opera House, Elizabethan Theatre, Sydney, Canberra Theatre, Comedy Theatre, Melbourne, Comedy Theatre London with Old Tote Theatre Company & AETT	
1977	Dr. Brain's Body		UNSW Parade Theatre, Sydney	
1977–1978	Sleuth		NSW & Mildura Arts Centre	
1978	Bedroom Farce		Her Majesty's Theatre, Sydney, Theatre Royal, Sydney	
1994	A Winning Day	Allan	Q Theatre, Penrith	
1995	King Lear		Sydney Theatre Company at Orange Civic Theatre, Q Theatre Penrith, Wharf Theatre, Sydney	
1995	Scenes from a Separation	Lawrence Clifford	Fairfax Studio, Melbourne with MTC	
1997	The Memory of Water	Mike	Marian St Theatre, Sydney	
2001–2002	Much Ado About Nothing		Southern Cross University with STC, Christ Church Cathedral, Q Theatre Penrith	
2010	Codgers	Rod	Australian tour	
2017	Borscht or a series of seemingly accidental digressions in an attempt to understand casual racism		Wentworth Falls School of Arts	
2024	Mrs Hawke and the Angel of Death		Keystone 1889 with Bathurst Theatre Company	
2024	Black, No Sugar	Narrator	Bathurst Memorial Entertainment Centre	

== Scriptwriter ==
Year	Production	Episodes
1994–2013	Neighbours	171 episodes (credited as pen name John Hanlon)
2003–2008	Home and Away	47 episodes (as John Hanlon)
1999	All Saints	1 episode: "Dependence Day" (as Shane Porteous)

== Animation ==
Year	Production	Role	Type
1977	Moby-Dick	Layout artist	TV movie
1978–1981	The All New Popeye Hour	Layout artist	TV series
1981	Dinky Dog	Layout artist	TV series, 16 episodes
1979	Casper the Friendly Ghost – He Ain't Scary, He's Our Brother	Layout artist (as Shane Porteous)	TV movie
1979	Casper's First Christmas	Layout artist (as Shane Porteous)	TV short
1979	Off on a Comet	Layout artist	TV movie
1979	From the Earth to the Moon	Layout artist	TV movie
1980	Drak Pack	Layout artist	TV series
1981	The Kwicky Koala Show	Layout artist	TV series, 1 episode
1981	The Flintstones – Wind Up Wilma	Layout artist	Short film
1981	Laverne and Shirley in the Army	Layout artist	
1981	Daniel Boone	Layout artist	
1981	The Fonz and the Happy Days Gang	Layout artist	TV series
1995	Blinky Bill’s Extraordinary Excursion	Layout artist	TV series
2001	The Magic Pudding	Layout artist	Film

== Appearances ==
Year	Production	Notes
2017	The Schlocky Horror Picture Show	
2015–2019	The Professor's Scary Movie	
Various	Macquarie Bank	TVC voiceover
