= Wayne Harrison (director) =

Australian director, writer and producer

- Born: Wayne David Harrison; 7 March 1953 (age 73); East Melbourne, Australia
- Education: University of New South Wales
- Occupations: Director; writer; producer; performer; actor
- Years active: 1975–present

Wayne David Harrison AM (born in East Melbourne, Australia in 1953) is an Australian director, writer, producer, performer and actor.

== Biography ==
Harrison was a child and teenage star performing on stage and television, including performing in J.C. Williamsons' musicals. He moved to Sydney in 1975.

In 1977, Harrison enrolled at the University of New South Wales (UNSW) and completed an Honours Degree majoring in history.

In 1979, Harrison began working on the magazine Campaign as news editor, and later editor. With Les McDonald, he opened "The Bookshop Darlinghurst" in Darlinghurst in 1983. In 1981, after meeting Richard Wherrett, then artistic director of the recently formed Sydney Theatre Company (STC) in Sydney, he was appointed the company's Literary Manager/Resident Dramaturg. He took over from Wherrett as Director of the STC in 1990 and served as Director/CEO until 1999.

From 1999 to 2001, he was the Creative Director of SFX/Back Row and Clear Channel Entertainment (Europe).

In 2005–2007, Harrison was the Creative Director of Sydney's New Year's Eve event. 2007 he was the director of the Helpmann Awards for Live Performance Australia. In 2006 he co-wrote and directed the Spiegelworld circus cabaret sensation Absinthe which played in New York and Miami, before taking up residency in a custom-built Spiegeltent on the grounds of Caesar's Palace, Las Vegas in 2011, where it is still running.

In 2006, he was the director of the 2006 Commonwealth Games closing ceremony, held in Melbourne, as well as the director of the touring production of 2 Weeks with the Queen for Adelaide's Windmill Theatre Arts and End of the Rainbow in Sydney, Melbourne and the Edinburgh Festival.

== Career ==
- 1995: Directed Dead White Males by David Williamson (world première) for the Sydney Theatre Company.
- 1996: Directed Heretic, by David Williamson (world première) for the Sydney Theatre Company.
- 2002: Directed Mum's The Word Robert C Kelly Limited (English tour); also directed Alone It Stands for Mollison Productions.
- 2004: Directed Through the Wire, National Theatre Connections.
- 2005: Directed The Return of Houdini (Variety Magic show), City Theatre, Reykjavík, Iceland.
- 2008: Director of Codgers Directed and wrote Absinthe and Desir for Spiegelworld in New York and Miami.
- 2011: Directed and wrote Absinthe for Spiegelworld at Caesars Palace in Las Vegas.

== Honours ==
On 11 June 2012, Harrison was named a Member of the Order of Australia for "service to the arts as a director, writer, producer and performer, to Australian cultural life, and as a supporter of emerging talent."

== Oral history ==
Oral history interviews with Harrison are available at the National Library of Australia.
