= Marnie Reece-Wilmore =

Australian actress

- Born: 10 January 1974 (age 51)
- Occupation: Actress
- Known for: Neighbours as Debbie Martin

Marnie Reece-Wilmore (born 10 January 1974) is an Australian actress from Sydney. She is best known for her role playing Debbie Martin in Neighbours, and was the third actress to portray the character.

== Early life ==
Reece-Wilmore's grandparents, uncle and father emigrated to Australia from Cleethorpes in 1951. She has two older sisters, an older brother, three step-sisters and a step-brother. Her father was a recording engineer and her mother a production assistant. Reece-Wilmore began appearing in school plays when she was seven years old, before she began doing voice work for television and radio commercials. She lived with her family in Sydney, until she was cast on Neighbours and had to relocate to Melbourne.

== Career ==
In 1992, Reece-Wilmore starred in the television film The Distant Home with Melissa Jaffer and Grant Dodwell.

Reece-Wilmore is best known for playing Debbie Martin in the Australian soap opera Neighbours from 1992 to 1994, and again from 1996 to 1997. In 2005, Reece-Wilmore filmed a cameo for the Neighbours' 20th anniversary special.

Since leaving Neighbours in 1997, Reece-Wilmore has made guest appearances in television programmes such as Police Rescue, Blue Heelers, Stingers, Law of the Land, Halifax f.p., City Homicide, Dogstar and The New Adventures of Ocean Girl.

She worked with the Melbourne Theatre Company in a production of Pride and Prejudice in 1999. She also appeared as an LA Groupie in the 2002 film Queen of the Damned.

== Filmography ==
Year	Title	Role	Notes
1992–1994, 1996–1997, 2005	Neighbours	Debbie Martin	Series regular
1992	The Distant Home	Sally Harrison	TV movie
1995	Police Rescue	Danni	Episode: "Rescue Me"
1995	Law of the Land	Serena Goodman	Episode: "Glory Road"
1998	Blue Heelers	Kate Hughes	Episode: "Spinning the Yarn"
1999	Halifax f.p.	Annabel Colless	Episode: "A Murder of Crows"
2000	The New Adventures of Ocean Girl	Princess Neri	10 episodes
2001	Blue Heelers	Prudence Day	Episode: "A Safe Bet"
2001	Stingers	Magda Stanton	Episode: "Tell Me You Love Me"
2002	Queen of the Damned	LA Groupie	Feature film
2005	Life	Elisa	TV movie
2011	City Homicide	Bridget Mangus	Episode: "The Business of Fear"
2011	Dogstar	Voice	Episodes: "Fatal Attraction", "Titanium Chef", "The Greening of Gavin"
2013	The Broken Shore	Jadeen	TV movie

== Theatre ==
Year	Title	Role	Company
1999	Pride and Prejudice	Mary Bennet and Miss Jenkinson	Melbourne Theatre Company
