= 10 Terrorists =

- Directed by: Dee McLachlan
- Screenplay by: Lenny de Vries; Dee McLachlan
- Produced by: Andrea Buck; Dee McLachlan
- Starring: Jackie Diamond; Richard Cawthorne; Sachin Joab; Kendal Rae; Matt Hetherington; Osamah Sami; Veronica Sywak; Jasper Bagg
- Cinematography: Peter Falk
- Edited by: Sam Davies; Dee McLachlan
- Music by: Grant Innes McLachlan
- Production company: The Picture Tank
- Distributed by: The Picture Tank
- Release date: 29 March 2012
- Running time: 88 minutes

10 Terrorists is a 2012 Australian black comedy film, directed by Dee McLachlan. Dee is best known for her direction in the award-winning 2007 film The Jammed.

== Plot ==
The film follows Max Brunette, a producer who recruits ten wannabe terrorists to compete in an elimination-style contest. They do this via a series of challenges and interrogations in order to win a million dollars – but the show starts to derail.

== Cast ==
- Jackie Diamond as Judge Rosalinda Olivera Sanchez
- Sachin Joab as Judge Miki Miraj
- Richard Cawthorne as Judge MI6
- Kendal Rae as Simone Price, Host
- Matt Hetherington as Sam Brown, Canadian Contestant
- Leah de Niese as Sri Lankan Activist, Cat
- Veronica Sywak as Eco-Terrorist, Terra
- Jasper Bagg as WWTBAT Producer
- Osamah Sami as Persian Activist, Azim
- Julie Eckersley as Show's Psychologist
- Samir Malik as Somali Pirate, Yah Yah
- Adam Pierzchalski as Polish Thug, Kret
- Louise Crawford as Reporter at Bomb Site
- Ratidzo Mambo as Fame Contestant, Cleopatra
- Masa Yamaguchi as Ryuichi, Japanese Contestant
- Frieda McKenna as Ying, Chinese Contestant
- Melissa Bergland as Car Hijack Victim
