= Masa Yamaguchi =

Australian actor

- Born: 1974 (age 51–52); London, England
- Education: National Institute of Dramatic Art
- Occupations: Actor, stunt performer, fight choreographer

Hidemasa Yamaguchi (山口 英勝; born 1974), known professionally as Masa Yamaguchi, is a Japanese-Australian actor, stunt performer and fight choreographer.

== Biography ==
Yamaguchi was born in London to Japanese parents, and raised in Tokyo, Japan. At the age of 15, his family moved to Melbourne, Australia, where he attended Brighton Grammar School. He graduated from National Institute of Dramatic Art, graduating in 2001, the first Japanese student to do so.

He later appeared in the film The Condemned as Go Saiga, a Japanese killer, who later teams up with McStarley. He has also acted on stage, including in Katherine Thomson's King Tide for the Griffin Theatre Company.

Yamaguchi has practiced martial arts since the age of 3. He holds 2nd dan black belts in judo and taekwondo, and practices kenjutsu.

In 2024, Yamaguchi was named for the series The Narrow Road to the Deep North.

== Filmography ==
=== Film appearances ===
Year	Title	Role	Notes
2005	Star Wars: Episode III – Revenge of the Sith	Senator	(uncredited)
2005	Feed	Dog Boy	
2005	The Great Raid	Lt Hikobe	
2006	Dark Love Story	Kiyoshi	
2007	The Jammed	Dyce	
2007	The Condemned	Saiga	
2008	Onshinfutsu	Yutaka Honjo	
2009	Strangers on a Sushi Train	Chef	Short
2010	Tomorrow, When the War Began	Sergeant	
2010	Sakuraniku	Shigayo	Short
2011	The Last Race	Dr Matsui	
2012	10 Terrorists	Japan	
2013	Tourist	Hiroshi	
2013	The Wolverine	Yakuza 4	
2013	The Railway Man	Kempei Officer	
2017	Top Knot Detective	Various	
2018	Tokyo Ghoul	Jason	Short
2019	The Brighton MIracle	J.R	
2024	Life After Fighting	Ethan	
2025	Beast of War	Commander Tetsuo Harada	

=== Television appearances ===
Year	Title	Role	Notes
2025	The Narrow Road to the Deep North	Lieutenant Fukuhara	5 episodes
2023	The PM's Daughter	Guard	1 episode
2023	Suka	Yugi	TV movie
2020	The Singapore Grip	Matsushita	3 episodes
2019	The Unlisted	Haru Tanaka	1 episode
2016	Marco Polo	Keshig	1 episode
2015	Strike Back	Shiro	2 episodes
2014	Soul Mates	Crossfitter	1 episode
2011	Rush	Kenta	2 episodes
2009	Sea Patrol	Zhang	1 episode
2008	City Homicide	Joe Tao	1 episode
2003	White Collar Blue	John	1 episode
2003	Life Support	Penne Guy	1 episode
2001–02	Crash Palace	Jun	3 episodes
2001	Changi	Guard	6 episodes
1999	Tribe	Massahi	4 episodes
1999	Crash Zone	Mr Hashimoto	1 episode
1999	Halifax F.P	Dennis	1 episode
1998	Seachange (TV series)	Yido	1 episode
