= Cops and Robbers (1993 film) =

- Directed by: Murray Reace
- Written by: Timothy Bean
- Produced by: Phil Gerlach; Tom Parkinson
- Starring: Grant Dodwell; Rima Te Wiata; Mark Wright
- Cinematography: Steve Arnold
- Edited by: Simon Reece
- Music by: Todd Hunter
- Release date: 1993
- Running time: 95
- Countries: Australia; New Zealand
- Language: English

Cops and Robbers is a 1993 Australian-New Zealand film about a bankrupt man who embarks on a career of crime. It was renamed during production to Kevin Rampenbacker and the Electric Kettle due to the release of an American film titled Cops and Robbers. It screened at a film festival in New Hampshire and had a video release in Hungary.

Helen Martin in New Zealand film, 1912-1996 says it "aims to be a black, off-the-wall, action-packed comedy drama. It inverts expectations (old women buy condoms, a wino drinks out of a wine glass) with a heavy hand and the pace drags." Leigh Paatsch in The Age joked that it had set back Grant Dodwell's chances of fame on the big screen.

== Cast ==
- Grant Dodwell as John
- Rima Te Wiata as Cop
- Mark Wright as Kevin
- Melissa Kounnas as Rita
- Gosia Dobrowolska as Bitch
- Martin Vaughan as Wino
- Lyn Collingwood as Boss
