= Welcome to the Jungle (2007 film) =

2007 film by Jonathan Hensleigh

- DVD cover
- Directed by: Jonathan Hensleigh
- Written by: Jonathan Hensleigh
- Produced by: Gale Anne Hurd
- Starring: Sandy Gardiner; Callard Harris; Nickolas Richey; Veronica Sywak
- Cinematography: Jonathan Hensleigh; John Leonetti
- Edited by: John Leonetti
- Music by: Richard B. Larimore
- Production companies: Bauer Martinez Studios; Valhalla Motion Pictures; Steelbridge Film Works
- Distributed by: Bauer Martinez Studios; Dimension Extreme; Genius Products
- Release date: April 19, 2007
- Running time: 83 minutes
- Country: United States
- Language: English
- Budget: $200,000

Welcome to the Jungle is a 2007 American found footage docufiction horror film directed by Jonathan Hensleigh and starring Sandy Gardiner, Callard Harris, Nickolas Richey and Veronica Sywak. A stylistic homage to the highly controversial cult horror film Cannibal Holocaust, the film follows a group of ambitious reporters who run afoul of a bloodthirsty native tribe.

== Plot ==
Welcome to the Jungle revolves around the journey of two young couples, Colby and Mandi and Mikey and Bijou. They go to Southwest New Guinea from Fiji to search for Michael Rockefeller, the son of New York Governor Nelson Rockefeller, who disappeared back in 1961. Their goal is to sell an interview with him to the tabloids for $1,000,000. During their quest, they face danger from armed criminals and psychopathic border guards. However, a local community provides them with evidence that suggests that Michael Rockefeller may still be alive. The group continues deep into the jungle, where they come across two Christian missionaries and a middle-aged Australian man who warns them not to disturb the tribes in the area.

As they proceed, tensions rise between the two couples, which attracts the attention of a local cannibalistic tribe. The tribe stalks Mikey and Bijou while they are on a makeshift boat in the river, and then attack them when they reach the shore. The next morning, Colby and Mandi realize that most of their essential belongings are missing, and they fear that Mikey and Bijou took their items and went ahead to find and interview Rockefeller without them. Colby and Mandi decide to find their friends and discover blood and bits of clothing on the shore where they were kidnapped. They continue deep into the jungle and eventually find the body of Bijou. Later that night, they find the half-eaten bodies of the Christian missionaries they had met earlier. Finally, they find Mikey, whose legs and arms have been eaten off, and they decide to kill him out of mercy and escape from the cannibals.

After escaping, the young couple comes across a seemingly friendlier tribe that invites them to their village and provides them with food. Colby and Mandi talk about their future plans, but their conversation is cut short when the tribe knocks them unconscious and kills them. Seconds later, an older white man is seen walking away from the tribe.

== Cast ==
- Sandy Gardiner as Mandi
- Callard Harris as Colby
- Nick Richey as Mikey
- Veronica Sywak as Bijou
- D. Kevin Epps as Fijian Warrior Shaman
- John R. Leonetti as Helicopter Pilot
- Clifton Morris as Fijian Warrior
- Rich Morris as Christian Missionary
- Jeran Pascascio as Fijian Warrior
- Del Roy as Old Man
- Darren Anthony Thomas as Fijian Warrior

== Release ==
The film premiered at the London FrightFest Film Festival on April 19, 2007 before being released direct to DVD in most major territories.
