= The Distant Home =

- DVD cover
- Written by: Tony Morphett
- Directed by: Robert Marchand
- Starring: Melissa Jaffer; Graeme Blundell; Marnie Reece-Wilmore; Dene Kermond; Tina Bursill
- Country of origin: Australia
- Original language: English

Production
- Producers: Robert Bruning; Adriennne Read

Original release
- Release: 1992

The Distant Home is an Australian TV movie about a couple who discover their daughter is an alien.

== Plot ==
Jim and Maria Harrison are an ordinary couple living in an ordinary suburb. The only extraordinary thing about them is that their daughter Sally is about to become ruler of the galaxy.

The Harrisons were expecting their first child. On the way to the hospital the weather was strange, the electrical system of the family sedan failed, and when their child is born, it was unexpectedly twins, a boy and a girl, Bobby and Sally.

What the Harrisons did not know was that the leader of the Galaxy Empire was also pregnant at the time. As there was a war between the Empire and the Confederacy, to safeguard the Empires child, it was implanted in Maria's womb and left up to her to raise.

Twelve years pass and the twins have grown up, but the time has come for Sally to return to her real family, and rule as she was meant to. Unfortunately she is knocked over by a car while riding her new bike and is taken to hospital where it is discovered that she is an alien. With the government involved, Sally is unable to return to either family until the Harrisons make plans to rescue her and return her to her real mother and fulfill her destiny out among the stars.

== Cast ==
- Melissa Jaffer as Mrs Webster
- Graeme Blundell as Dr Chambers
- Marnie Reece-Wilmore as Sally Harrison
- Grant Dodwell as Jim Harrison
- Di Smith as Maria Harrison
- Dene Kermond as Bobby Harrison
- Tina Bursill as Dr Rosen
- Annie Byron as Dr Allport

== Home media ==
A DVD copy of the film was marketed in Australia by Flashback Entertainment cat. 20413
