= Goran Stolevski =

Australian film director

Goran Stolevski (born 1985) is a Macedonian Australian filmmaker. He made his feature film directorial debut with the 2022 film You Won't Be Alone, which premiered at the 2022 Sundance Film Festival.

His second feature film, Of an Age, was the winner of the Best Film Award at CinefestOZ in 2022.

== Personal life ==
Stolevski was born in the Socialist Republic of Macedonia and spent his childhood in Tetovo. At the age of 12, he emigrated to Australia with his family. He is openly gay.

== Filmography ==
=== Feature film ===
| Year | Title | Director | Writer | Editor |
|---|---|---|---|---|
| 2022 | You Won't Be Alone | Yes | Yes | No |
| 2022 | Of an Age | Yes | Yes | Yes |
| 2023 | Housekeeping for Beginners | Yes | Yes | Yes |

=== Short film ===
| Year | Title | Director | Writer | Editor | Notes |
|---|---|---|---|---|---|
| 2007 | Ambassador | Yes | Yes | Yes | |
| 2008 | Blood | Yes | Yes | Yes | |
| 2008 | Picture of a Good Woman | Yes | Yes | Yes | |
| 2012 | Frankie's Big Heart | Yes | No | No | |
| 2015 | Today Is Not the Day | Yes | Yes | No | |
| 2016 | You Deserve Everything | Yes | Yes | No | Also producer |
| 2017 | Everything We Wanted | Yes | Yes | No | |
| 2017 | Would You Look at Her | Yes | Yes | Yes | |
| 2018 | My Boy Oleg | Yes | Yes | No | |

=== Television ===
| Year | Title | Note |
|---|---|---|
| 2018 | Nowhere Boys | 3 episodes |
