= You Deserve Everything =

- Directed by: Goran Stolevski
- Written by: Goran Stolevski
- Produced by: Goran Stolevski
- Starring: Sachin Joab; Jean Bachoura
- Cinematography: Mark Morris
- Edited by: Kristine Bondarenko; Andrew McCarthy
- Release date: 18 June 2016 (Sydney Film Festival)
- Running time: 19 minutes
- Country: Australia
- Languages: English; Arabic

You Deserve Everything is a 2016 Australian short film written and directed by Goran Stolevski and starring Sachin Joab and Jean Bachoura.

== Premise ==
A doctor's tentative romance with the hospital's Arabic interpreter is evolving into something deeper. But everything is not as it seems.

== Cast ==
- Sachin Joab as Doctor Edward
- Jean Bachoura as Sami

== Awards and official selections ==
- Official Selection - Sydney Film Festival
- Official Selection - San Francisco International LGBT Film Festival
- Official Selection - Melbourne International Film Festival
- Official Selection - Vancouver Queer Film Festival

Year	Award	Category	Recipient	Result
2016	Sydney Film Festival	Rouben Mamoulian Award for Best Director	Goran Stolevski	Won

== See also ==
- Cinema of Australia
