= The New Adventures of Ocean Girl =

- Created by: Jonathan M. Shiff
- Written by: Glen Dolman; Tom Galbraith; Judy Malmgren; Jonathan M. Shiff; Paul Williams
- Directed by: John Tatoulis; Colin South
- Voices of: Marnie Reece-Wilmore; Samuel Johnson; Michael Carman; Marg Downey; Gary Files; Dennis Pryor; Doug Tremlett; Stephen Whittaker
- Narrated by: Sigrid Thornton
- Theme music composer: Keith C. Moore
- Opening theme: "The Promised One" by Tiddas
- Country of origin: Australia
- Original language: English
- No. of seasons: 1
- No. of episodes: 26

Production
- Executive producer: Jonathan M. Shiff
- Producers: Colin South; John Tatoulis
- Running time: 30 minutes
- Production companies: Media World Features Pty Ltd.; Animation Works

Original release
- Network: Network Ten
- Release: 11 February – 5 August 2000

Related
- Ocean Girl

The New Adventures of Ocean Girl is an Australian animated television series inspired by the live-action series Ocean Girl.

== Synopsis ==
On the planet of Oceana there were four life giving crystals guarded by the Sacred Whales, the keepers of wisdom. Thousands of years ago Galiel, the evil space wizard, stole one of the crystals and upset the balance of nature. Now Neri, Princess of Oceana, must search for the crystal and restore the balance of nature.

== Cast ==
- Sigrid Thornton - Narrator
- Marnie Reece-Wilmore - Princess Neri
- Samuel Johnson - Prince Jobah
- Michael Carman - Galiel, Laziah, Captain Sharkana
- Marg Downey - Elgar, Mandrool, Sheema
- Gary Files - Zardor
- Dennis Pryor - King Nemon
- Doug Tremlett - Neanda, Amphibian Lieutenant, Flyer
- Stephen Whittaker - Moza
- Abbe Holmes - Griffin, Flyers
- Michael Veitch - Flyer
- Hamish Hughes - Mole
- Lucy Taylor - Mad Flyer
- Fred Parslow - Keeper of Time

== Episodes ==
1. The Return (11 February 2000)
2. Possessed (18 February 2000)
3. Hearing The Call (25 February 2000)
4. A Common Bond (3 March 2000)
5. The Quest Begins (10 March 2000)
6. Neri Has The Power (17 March 2000)
7. The Keeper Of The Crystal (24 March 2000)
8. The Test Of Faith (31 March 2000)
9. The Promise Is Kept (7 April 2000)
10. The Crystal Is Returned (14 April 2000)
11. The Crystal Or A Friend (21 April 2000)
12. Secrets Of The Ancient (28 April 2000)
13. Elgar And Moza For Dinner (5 May 2000)
14. Fearless (12 May 2000)
15. The Truth Is Kept Secret (19 May 2000)
16. Galiel Unites The Clans (26 May 2000)
17. The Keeper Of Time (2 June 2000)
18. The Deepest, Darkest Chasm (9 June 2000)
19. Elgar's Crystal (16 June 2000)
20. That Sinking Feeling (23 June 2000)
21. Moza's Time Of Reckoning (30 June 2000)
22. Queen Elgar (7 July 2000)
23. The Surfacing (14 July 2000)
24. Neanda Leads The Way (21 July 2000)
25. The Countdown (28 July 2000)
26. The Time Has Come (5 August 2000)
