= Veronica Sywak =

Australian actress

- Born: 1981 or 1982 (age 44–45); Sydney, Australia
- Occupation: Actress

Veronica Sywak is an Australian actress. She was born in Sydney, Australia.

== Biography ==
Sywak's film career began to gain momentum in 2007 when she landed the lead role in the Australian film The Jammed, for which she received an IF Award nomination (Best Actress) and an AFI Award nomination (Best Lead Actress).

In 2008, Sywak facilitated a screening of The Jammed at the United Nations in New York on behalf of the United Nations Office of Drugs and Crime. It marked the first Australian film to be screened at the United Nations.

Sywak has a Bachelor of Media and Communications degree from the University of New South Wales.

== Filmography ==
=== Film ===
Year	Title	Role	Type
2002	Blurred		Feature film
2007	The Jammed	Lead role	Feature film
2007	Welcome to the Jungle	Bijou	Feature film
2012	10 Terrorists	Eco-terrorist, Terra	Feature film

=== Television ===
Year	Title	Role	Type
2003	CrashBurn	Emily	TV series
2012	Sea Patrol		TV series, season 1, episode 12: "Deep Water"
