= Spiegelworld =

American comedic theatre company

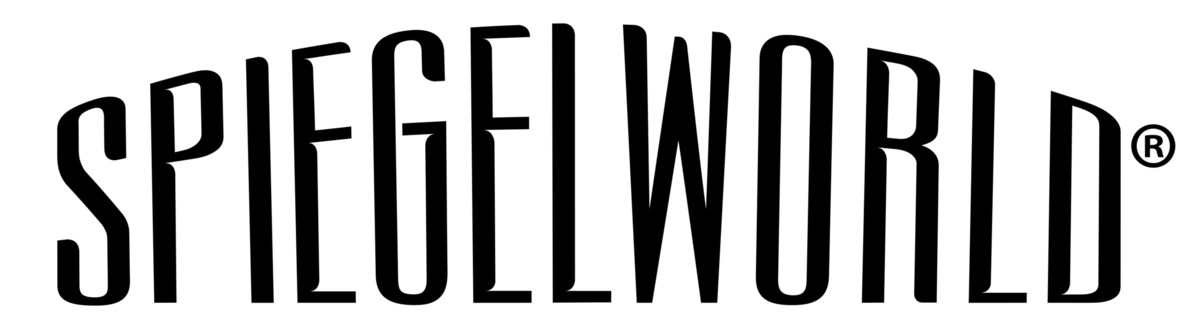
- Type: Private company
- Industry: Entertainment, live theater, comedy, burlesque, contemporary circus
- Founded: 2006
- Founder: Ross Mollison
- Area served: Las Vegas, New York, Atlantic City, Australia
- Website: spiegelworld.com

Spiegelworld is an American comedic theater company and contemporary circus known for its current shows: Absinthe, DiscoShow, and Atomic Saloon Show, all in Las Vegas, and Atlantic City's The Hook. The theater company takes its name from the traveling Belgian performance tents known as spiegeltents (Flemish for "tent of mirrors") in which it has staged a number of productions.

== Background ==
The company began by producing contemporary circus-style shows for a heritage Belgian spiegeltent, made of wood and mirrors, which blurred the lines between passive performance and audience activity. Audiences were encouraged to order from the bars during the show while performers appeared on a central stage only nine feet in diameter.

Founded and currently headed by Australian producer Ross Mollison, Spiegelworld first opened in the summer of 2006 with the premiere of the show Absinthe on South Street Seaport’s Pier 17 on the East River in New York City. Spiegelworld returned in 2007 with a follow-up season of Absinthe and the premiere of La Vie. The Spiegelworld village was expanded to include a restaurant, hammock garden, outdoor bars, VIP cabanas and a late night music program. In August 2008, Spiegelworld presented a third season on Pier 17 with two spiegeltents and three shows: Absinthe, Gazillionaire’s Late Night Lounge and Desir as well as a live music program and silent disco.

Spiegelworld toured Absinthe to Miami South Beach in 2008, and in January 2009 it created the live entertainment program at the Australian Open tennis grand slam tournament in Melbourne which included a season of Absinthe and a live music program.

In 2016, Spiegelworld presented a series of development showcase seasons in Las Vegas and at Joe’s Pub in New York City of Never Sleep Alone, an interactive dating advice comedy featuring the character Dr. Alex Schiller.

== "Circus Town" project in the Mojave Desert ==
In January 2023, Spiegelworld purchased the entire town of Nipton in California's Mojave Desert for $2.5 million. Spiegelworld has stated that Nipton will become their new base of operations and will become a place "where Spiegelworld artists and performers will retreat to dream, create and undertake unfettered artistic experimentation."

== Current productions ==
=== Absinthe ===
Hosted by The Gazillionaire and inspired by what is billed as the "absinthe-fueled cabarets" of late 19th century Europe, Absinthe is an adult-themed production of acrobatics, burlesque and vaudeville. The creative team includes director Wayne Harrison, choreographer Lucas Newland and costume designer Angus Strathie.

After debuting the show in New York in 2006, Spiegelworld opened an enhanced version of Absinthe at Caesars Palace Las Vegas in April 2011. The show was initially presented in a 650 seat spiegeltent located on the Roman Plaza. After a six month season, the show was extended and transferred to a custom-built tent on the same location. Still running at present, Absinthe was named by Las Vegas Weekly as “the #1 greatest show in Las Vegas history” in 2016.

Absinthe toured Australia in 2015, co-presented by Nine Live. On 24 March 2016, a 3 month Los Angeles season of Absinthe opened at L.A. Live in Downtown Los Angeles.

=== Atomic Saloon Show ===
Hosted by proprietress Madam Boozy Skunkton, Atomic Saloon Show plays in a small Wild West-themed venue inside the Grand Canal Shoppes at The Venetian Resort Las Vegas. Audiences explore a maze of multiple bars, private dining rooms, balconies and booths while Skunkton’s staff perform acrobatic, comedy and variety acts on the tiny central stage. The creative team includes UK director Cal McCrystal and set and costume designer takis.

Spiegelworld premiered the Wild West themed Atomic Saloon Show at the 2019 Edinburgh Fringe Festival, playing from August 1 to 25 in the Palais du Variete spiegeltent at Assembly George Square Gardens. The show received 5-star reviews in The Times and The Scotsman, and then immediately transferred to its permanent Las Vegas home at the Atomic Saloon inside Grand Canal Shoppes at The Venetian. With performances commencing on September 8, 2019, this marked the first time that Spiegelworld had three shows concurrently playing on the Las Vegas strip.

=== The Hook ===
The Hook opened in 2023 at Caesars Atlantic City, in the recently restored 1920s-era Warner Theatre. The show draws on the entertainment history of Atlantic City It features a live show, an East Coast home for what is billed as "Italian-American psychedelic" Superfrico restaurant and cocktail bars. The Hook live show is directed by Irish comedy director Cal McCrystal.

== Past productions ==
=== La Vie ===
La Vie was a show produced by Spiegelworld which premiered in New York City in its Spiegeltent during the summer of 2007. Spiegelworld commissioned the Montreal based circus company Les Sept Doigts de la Main (The 7 Fingers) to create the show. Acts included apache dance, hand balance on canes, aerial silk and banquine with music from DJ Pocket. La Vie toured internationally until 2013.

=== Desír ===
Desir was a show produced by Spiegelworld which premiered in New York City in its spiegeltent during the summer of 2008.

=== Gazillionaire's Late Night Lounge ===
Gazillionare’s Late Night Lounge was an edgy late night variety show produced by Spiegelworld which premiered in New York City in its spiegeltent during the summer of 2008. The show was hosted by The Gazillionaire and his assistant Penny Pibbets, with house band Fish Circus and special guest acts each evening. The show featured audience participation and regular segments including What Would You Do For A Dollar?

=== Vegas Nocturne ===
In January 2014, Spiegelworld premiered its new show Vegas Nocturne at Rose.Rabbit.Lie. at The Cosmopolitan of Las Vegas. Presented in three distinct cantos throughout an integrated bar, showroom and restaurant venue, the show ran until July 2014. Select elements of Vegas Nocturne have since been presented at development showcase seasons at the Slipper Room and House of Yes in New York City and the 2015 Edinburgh Fringe Festival where it was voted Strangest Show.

=== Empire ===
On May 31, 2012, Spiegelworld returned to New York City with its new show Empire and a new site for its spiegeltent on an unused parking lot in Times Square. Empire commenced a 17 month Australian tour in Sydney on January 4, 2013. In late 2014, the show toured New Zealand and then in 2015 it played seasons in Tokyo, Portland, Toronto and Montreal.

=== OPM ===
Presented in the 350-seat Opium Theatre at the Cosmopolitan of Las Vegas, the show was set on a spaceship called OPM 73 with a destination of Uranus, the adults-only dinner show featured circus-themed performances, including hula hoops, sword swallowing, and juggling, loosely tied together with a comedic storyline.

In early 2018, Spiegelworld began creating Opium as a new show for Las Vegas which set out to combine an ensemble of comic characters, unusual variety acts and a retro outer space theme. Opium commenced previews at The Cosmopolitan of Las Vegas on March 13, 2018, and held its 800th performance on October 31, 2019. In 2021, the show was rebranded as OPM and took its final bow on December 31, 2023.

=== DiscoShow ===
DiscoShow opened at The Linq in 2024, as the second in a multi-year development deal between Spiegelworld and Caesars Entertainment; it drew upon New York City in the 1970s, with influence from disco and David Mancuso's The Loft. The 70-minute show was directed by Steven Hoggett and explored the early history of disco (spanning from its beginnings in the early 1970s, and culminating with Chicago's "Disco Demolition Night" in 1979). It was staged in a nightclub-like setting with no seats, and characters such as Åke Arthur Blomqvist (Eli Weinberg) encouraged the audience to participate in dance lessons. The space also features the bars 99 Prince and Glitterloft, and the New York-inspired restaurant Diner Ross, which serve as public extensions of the show's setting and did not require admission to visit.

On January 3, 2026, DiscoShow itself closed due to declining ticket sales, although the attached bars and restaurant will remain in operation.
