= Carolyn Johnson =

American television journalist

- Occupations: television anchor and reporter
- Notable work: co-anchor at KNBC-TV, KGO-TV
- Awards: five Emmy nominations, best reporter by American Women in Radio and Television, Service to Children Award from the NAB, Eugene Block Journalism Award, Arthritis Foundation Media Award, John Swett Award

Carolyn Johnson is a California-based television anchor and reporter. She has co-anchored the noon and 6PM newscasts of KNBC-TV in Los Angeles since July 2014. Until May 23, 2014, Johnson was the co-anchor of KGO-TV San Francisco News at 6 and 11 PM Monday through Friday. She began her broadcasting career as an intern at KCBS-TV in Los Angeles, then worked as a production assistant for KGO-TV while still in college. She worked behind the scenes, producing numerous programs and specials at KGO-TV before accepting a reporting position at KSBY. She returned to KGO-TV in 1998 as a reporter and anchor. On April 11, 2014, it was announced that Johnson was leaving KGO-TV.

Carolyn has received five Emmy nominations and has been honored as best reporter by American Women in Radio and Television, Golden Gate Chapter. She's also won a Service to Children Award from the National Association of Broadcasters; the Eugene Block Journalism Award for Outstanding Coverage of San Francisco Human Rights Issues; the Arthritis Foundation Media Award; and the John Swett Award for Outstanding Locally Produced Education Series.
