= Spiegeltent =

Festival tent

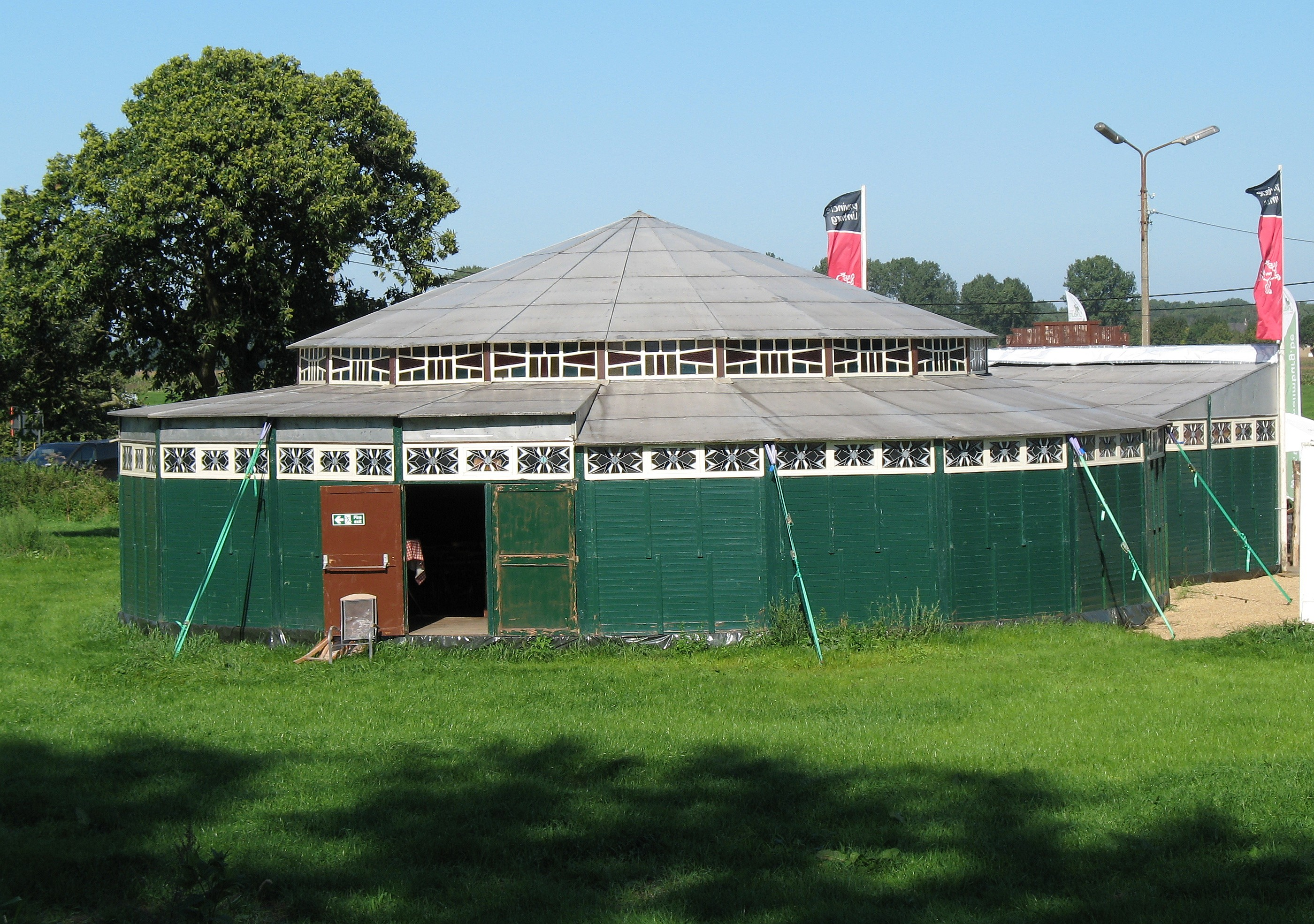
Glimburgercafé's spiegeltent at Veerpont Meeswijk-Berg

A spiegeltent (Dutch for "mirror tent", from spiegel+tent) is a large travelling tent, constructed from wood and canvas and decorated with mirrors and stained glass, intended as an entertainment venue.

Originally built in Belgium during the late 19th and early 20th centuries, only a handful of spiegeltents remain in existence and continuing to travel predominantly around Europe. Often as a feature attraction at various international arts festivals. Two tents used by Teatro ZinZanni have been in semi-permanent locations in Seattle and San Francisco for several years. The Melba Spiegeltent spent the better part of a century touring Europe, but is now permanently located in Melbourne, Australia. The Famous Spiegeltent, built in 1920, is now owned by Australian jazz piano player David Bates.

On April 1, 2011, Spiegelworld opened Absinthe at Caesars Palace, Paradise, Nevada in the 26-metre Salon Marlene spiegeltent. In 2007, the first spiegeltent arrived in Africa and toured South Africa as part of Madame Zingara's Theatre of Dreams dinner circus extravaganza.

== Origins and history ==
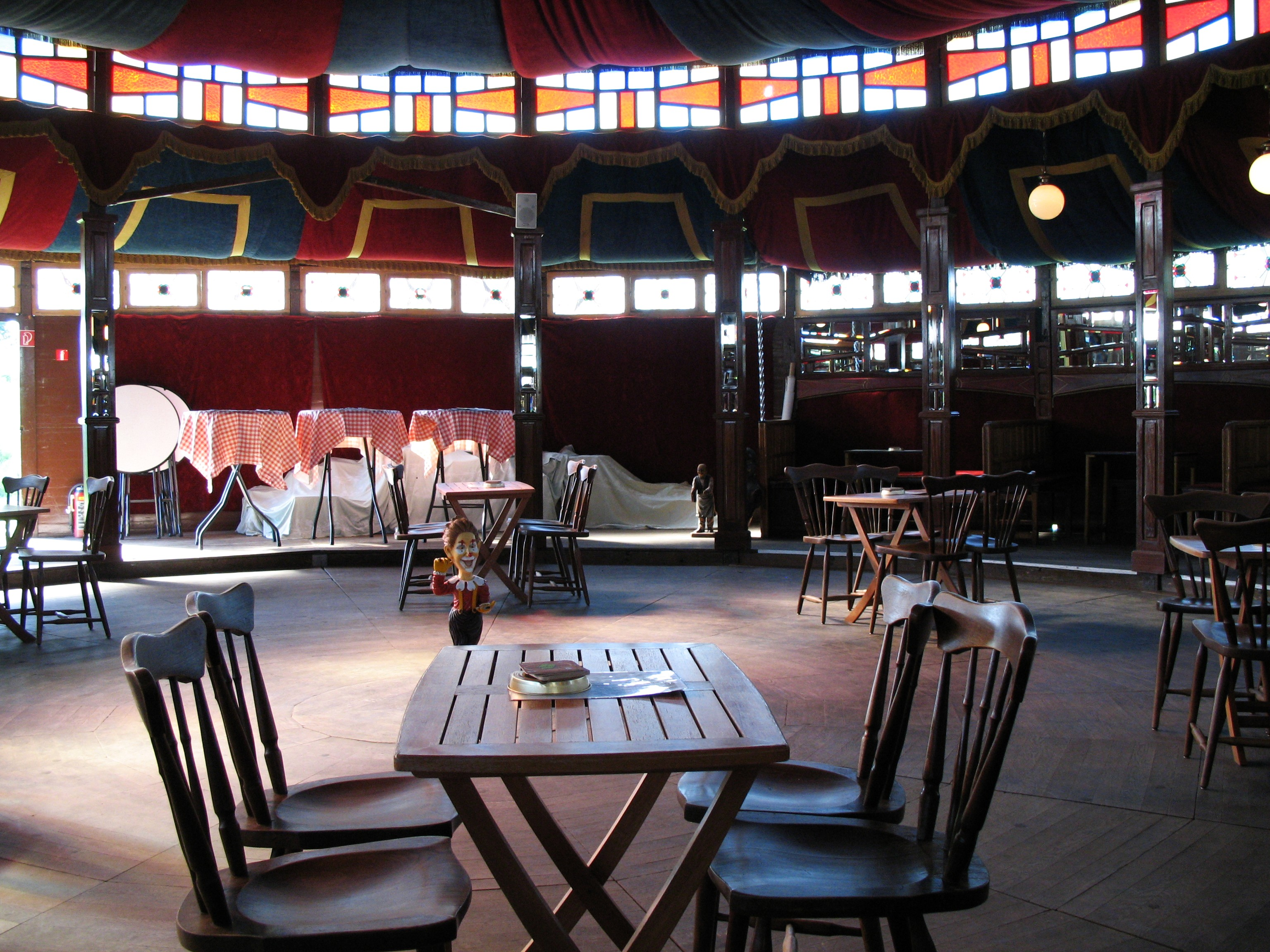
Interior shot of Glimburgercafé's spiegeltent, near Meeswijk, Belgium

The original spiegeltents were constructed in Flanders, Belgium in the late 19th century as mobile dance halls. They were transported around the country and assembled for town fairs in areas that did not have dance halls.

=== Historical tents ===
- De Parel Spiegeltent - A Belgian tent built in 1905, purchased as a venue for the Perth Fringe World. Previously known as the ‘De Parel Van Vuren’. Built by Belgium's renowned Klessens family, it is 18 meters in diameter and holds up to 350 people.
- The Melba Spiegeltent - A Belgian tent built in 1910, now based in Melbourne and owned by Circus Oz, with a capacity of 250 people.
- Palais Romantique - An Art Deco spiegeltent which is 17 meters in diameter and holds 300 people.
- Le Moulin Rouge - Built in 1910, it is currently used for a standing show in Seattle, Washington. It holds 295 people.
- Palais Nostalgique - Built in 1920, it is currently used for a standing show in San Francisco, California. It holds 295 people.
- Tivoli - Built in 1920 by the Klessens Family. It is a travelling tent.
- La Gaieté - An original Klessens tent built in 1932. It is 16 meters in diameter and holds 300 people.
- La Gayola - An Art Deco spiegeltent built in 1947 which holds 350 people.
- Ideal - An Art Nouveau spiegeltent, handmade in 1948, which holds 320 people.
- The Famous Spiegeltent
- Idolize - A spiegeltent decorated in Baroque style with a capacity of 450 guests.

=== Modern tents ===
- The Aurora - An Art Deco tent built in the Netherlands by Van Rosmalen in 2015. This tent measures 24.5 m (80 ft) in diameter, with a standing capacity of 700 people. As of October 2026 travelling around Australia with the company Spiegeltents Australia.
- Palais des Glaces - An Art Nouveau style tent built in 1992. It is 22 meters in diameter with a capacity of 300 people.
- Salon Revue - An Art Nouveau style tent built in 2006, measuring 22 meters in diameter.
- Bon Vivant - A dance hall tent built in an Art Nouveau style.
- Kempisch Danspaleis - A mirrored dance hall tent.
- Cristal Palace - A tent measuring 18 meters in diameter, with a capacity of 400 people.
- Carrousel - A tent with an oak wood interior and a capacity of 300 people. It is used for dining.
- De Lust - A rectangular mirror tent holding up to 500 people.
- Salon Perdu - A Jugendstil tent measuring 20 meters in diameter, with a capacity of 550 people.
- Deluxe - One of the smallest spiegeltents, built in Holland and owned by Van Rosmalen. This tent has a capacity of 225 people.
- Paradiso- A Jugenstil tent with a diameter of 24 meters, and a capacity of 800 people.
- Victoria - One of the most luxurious mirror tents. It is 25 meters in diameter, holding 1000 people standing, 600 seated and 420 seated for dinner.

== The Melba Spiegeltent (Melbourne, Australia) ==
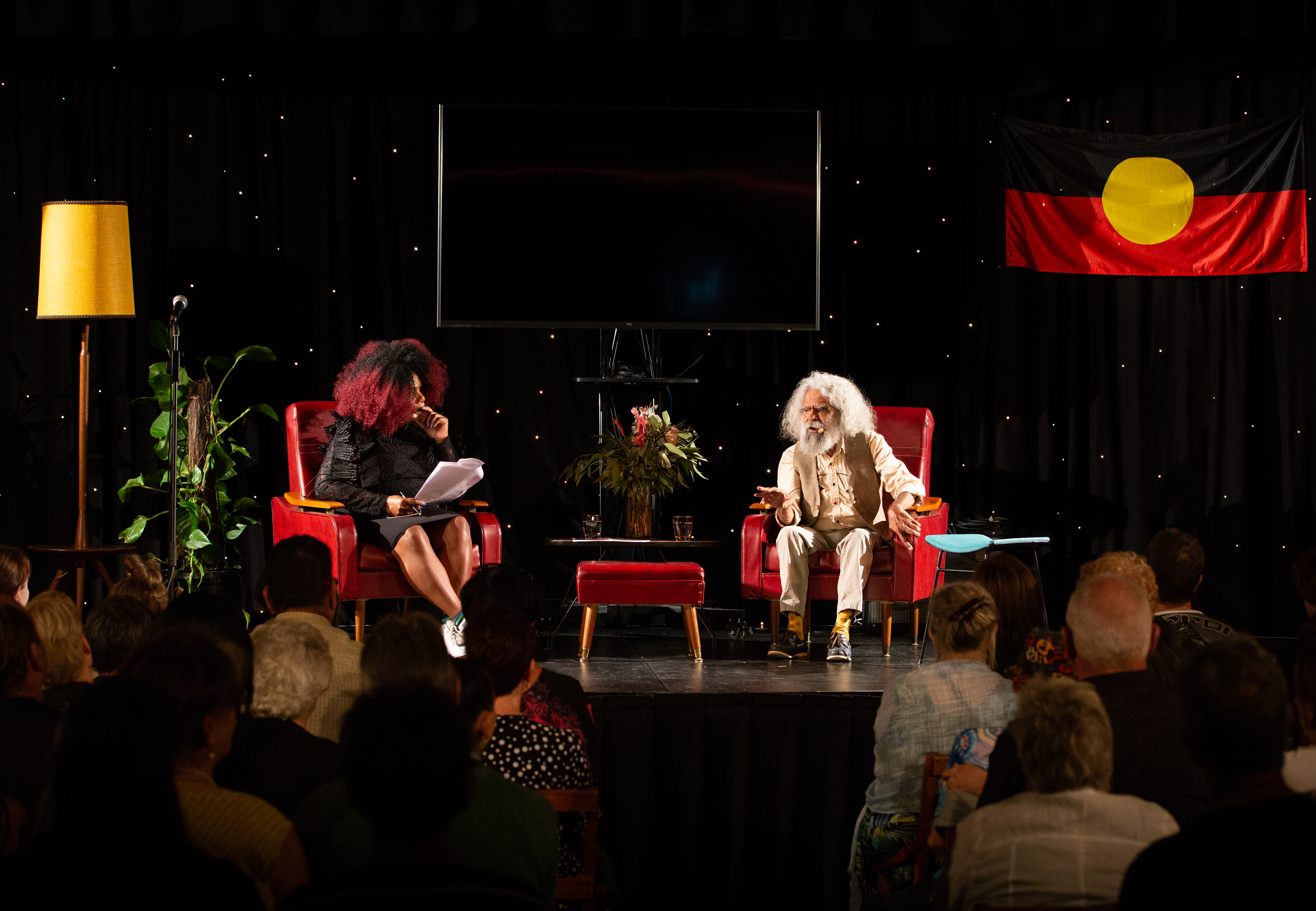
Jack Charles and Namila Benson at the Melba Spiegeltent

=== History ===
Built in Belgium in 1910 by mirror designer Oscar Mols Dom and tent maker Louis Goor, The Melba Spiegeltent spent almost a century travelling across Europe. Originally called The Bacaladera, the tent saw performances including Edith Piaf and Kurt Weil.

Frank Gasser, widely regarded as the godfather of circus and carnival entertainment in Australia, had long admired the beauty of the Spiegeltents and was desperate for one of his own. Gasser met Vita Sachtler in 2006, who had acquired the Spiegeltent as a deal in a barter. While Sachtler was in Germany chasing up a debt, the client had no money to spare but offered the Bacaladera Spiegeltent in exchange, which had been stored in old shed in the middle of the Black Forest. An agreement was made and the Spiegeltent was restored and re-introduced to the touring circuit running a show called Palais Des Fous in Germany.

After nearly a century of traveling Europe from festival to festival, Sachtler was prepared to sell to Gasser upon their meeting. Gasser performed some restoration work, updated the façade and renamed the Spiegeltent "The Melba Spiegeltent", after the Australian opera soprano Dame Nellie Melba.

=== Current use ===
The Melba Spiegeltent is now permanently situated within the Collingwood Arts Precinct at the home of Circus Oz, and hosts events including circus, cabaret, comedy, theatre, live music, and festivals. Performances have included Missy Higgins, Uncle Jack Charles and Lawrence Leung.

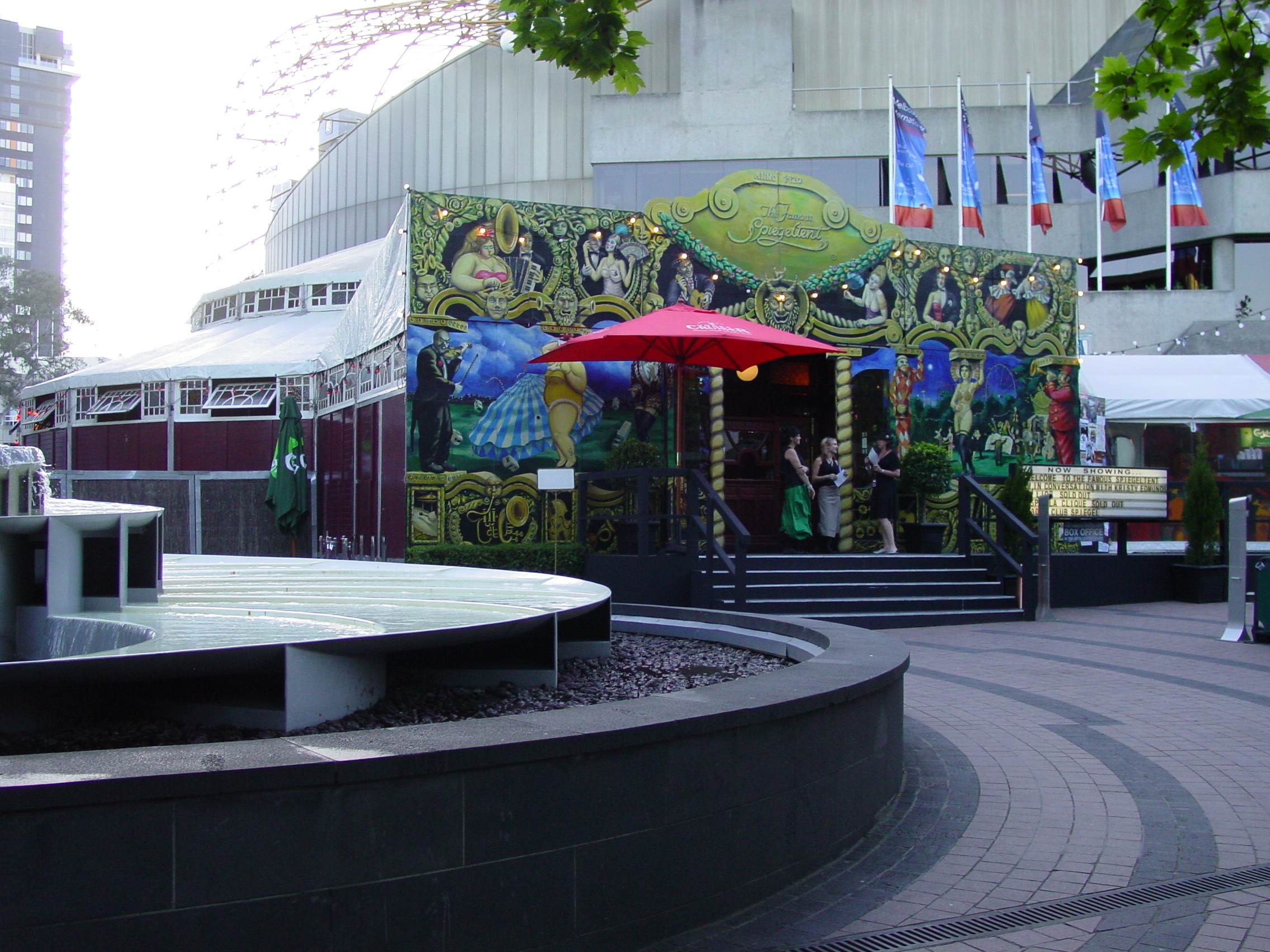
The Famous Spiegeltent, at The Arts Centre (Melbourne)

In 2018, The Melba won Best Venue at the Melbourne Fringe Festival.

== The Famous Spiegeltent ==
=== History ===
The Famous Spiegeltent, perhaps the most lavishly decorated of all, was built in 1920 in Belgium by master craftsmen Oscar Mols Dom and Louis Goor. Over the decades it has hosted some of the world's greatest performing artists, including German singer Marlene Dietrich, who famously performed "Falling in Love Again" in it during the 1930s.

=== Construction ===
The Famous Spiegeltent is transported from venue to venue in shipping containers, and is constructed on site at each location. It consists of about 3,000 pieces of wood, mirrors, canvas and stained glass, and is then detailed in velvet and brocade. It requires about 12 people to construct the 19 metres (62 ft) round venue,

The Famous Spiegeltent can hold an audience of about 316 people.

=== Current use ===
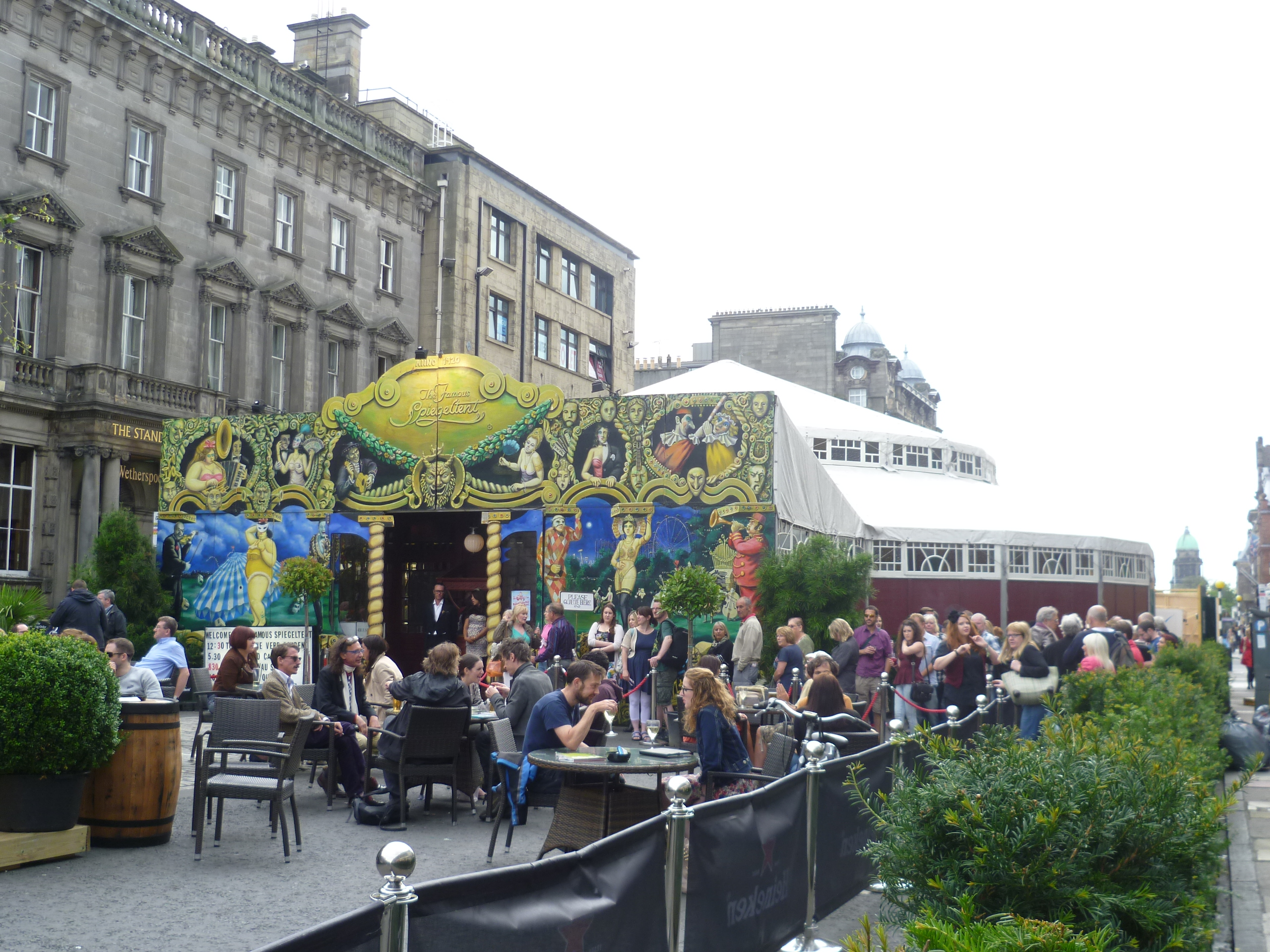
The Famous Spiegeltent at the Edinburgh, Australia, New Zealand, Japan, USA and Canada Festival Fringe, 2013

The Famous Spiegeltent is as of 2020 owned and managed by Australian jazz pianist and theatrical producer David Bates, who first utilised the tent as a venue at the 1996 Edinburgh Festival Fringe. After a successful visit to the Adelaide Fringe Festival in 2000, Bates bought the tent from previous owners Scottish & Newcastle and set it up as a unique travelling venue. It is a regular venue for Adelaide Fringe performances, usually within the venue cluster known as "The Garden of Unearthly Delights" in Rundle Park, Adelaide, and was used for the Adelaide Cabaret Festival in 2019. It still regularly tours Australia and goes to Edinburgh each year.

== Other spiegeltents ==
The Cabaret Sauvage is a "Magic Mirrors" spiegeltent located in the Parc de la Villette, at 59, boulevard Macdonald, in the 19th arrondissement of Paris, near the metro station of Porte de la Villette. The Cabaret Sauvage was created by Méziane Azaïche and inaugurated in December 1997. The Cabaret Sauvage has a diameter of 26 metres (85 ft) and a capacity of 600 people seated or 1,200 people standing.

Magic Mirrors Le Havre is a spiegeltent in Le Havre, France. Since 2010, this spiegeltent, made of wood and canvas, has been the venue for a variety of events, including music concerts, festivals, meetings, charity events, receptions, and many others, around 120 dates a year. Designed in the style of a ballroom of the Roaring Twenties, the decor is in Art Nouveau style. Its capacity is 950 people standing, and 550 people sitting, with a flexible interior which can cater for a variety of event types. This spiegeltent hosts around 60,000 people a year.

Magic Mirrors Istres spigeltent was a major investment of the Istrian project for Marseille Provence 2013. In 2015, it was revamped with a new facade.

Le MeM is a "Magic Mirrors" spiegeltent in Rennes, France. It has 1500 seats, and open-air café with a bar and catering service developed by Michelin-starred chef Julien Lemarié. In 2019, it opened for the festival of Big Love and the Transat festival.

La Estacion in Madrid has a large "Magic Mirrors" spiegeltent, located in one of the disused wings of Príncipe Pío Station. It has been a cultural and leisure attraction for the people of Madrid since 2017, with a wide range of entertainment, including a theatre programme and concerts as well as restaurants. The Gran Teatro Príncipe Pío has different spaces, including a theatre with capacity for around 1,600 spectators, which will also be used as a concert hall.

== Magic Mirrors Spiegeltent Tours ==
- Delyria - the first circus show produced in Mexico. Hosted in a "Magic Mirrors" spiegeltent in Monterrey and Puebla, Mexico.
- Absinthe - a show produced by Spiegelworld. Toured in 2015 - 2016 with a "Magic Mirrors" Spiegeltent in the US, Australia and New Zealand.
- Empire - a show produced by Spiegelworld, premiered in New York City in May 2012. Presented in a "Magic Mirrors" spiegeltent located on an unused car park in Times Square.
