= Unfinished Sky =

- Directed by: Peter Duncan
- Written by: Peter Duncan; Kees van der Hulst
- Produced by: Tom Hoffie; Robert Kievit; San Fu Maltha; Hanneke Niens; Cathy Rodda; Anton Smit; Mumtaz Yildirimlar
- Starring: William McInnes; Monic Hendrickx; David Field; Bille Brown
- Cinematography: Robert Humphries
- Edited by: Suresh Ayyar
- Music by: Antony Partos
- Production company: New Holland Pictures
- Distributed by: Palace Films
- Release date: 2007
- Running time: 94 minutes
- Country: Australia
- Language: English
- Box office: $745,484

Unfinished Sky is a 2007 drama film written and directed by Peter Duncan. William McInnes stars as John Woldring, an Australian farmer living in self-imposed exile after his wife's death, who rescues and protects Tahmeena, played by Monic Hendrickx, an Afghan refugee who has escaped abusive local townsfolk. Deliberated by scholars and Peter Duncan as a film focused on the response to 9/11, Unfinished Sky has also been described as post-national cinema, with themes of isolation, the fear of others, and the overcoming of obstacles, all relating to Australian identity.

Peter Duncan has reimagined the Dutch film The Polish Bride (1998), in an Australian context. Monic Hendrickx, who played the title role in The Polish Bride, plays Tahmeena; Unfinished Sky was a product of the Dutch-Australian venture New Holland Pictures, which was intent on the director's trying her for the role. In the role of John, William McInnes was praised for his portrayal of John as more isolated, stoic and wounded than his counterpart, Henk, in the Dutch film.

Unfinished Sky was filmed in Queensland at Beaudesert and Boonah; the cinematographer Robert Humphries deliberately framed the colours and reliability of the camera as a reflection of the familiarity of the central relationship. The first parts of the film are dramatically dull and feature the harsh Australia landscape. Editor Suresh Ayyar furthered this jaded quality by contrasting it with the vibrancy later in the film.

The film was released early on August 4, 2007, at the Brisbane Film Festival, on January 31 in the Netherlands, and on June 19 in Australia. It grossed just under $750,000 worldwide. It was relatively well received, winning various awards for best director, best adapted screenplay, best editor and best music during its theatrical release.

== Plot ==
John Woldring (William McInnes), a widowed farmer in outback Australia, is living in isolation outside a small Queensland town until Tahmeena (Monic Hendrickx), a traumatised Afghan refugee, collapses near his farm. Halted by an inherent cultural and language barrier, the two reconcile their damaging pasts over the course of the film.

Suspected of having murdered his wife, John is ostracised by the local townspeople, while Tahmeena has fled the Taliban with her daughter. She has been separated from her daughter and "propertied" by Bob Potter, the corrupt local pub owner, but escaped after being brutally bashed and raped. She and John struggle to communicate, given the language barrier, and he must keep her presence a secret from the nosey neighbours and from Police Sergeant Carl Allen, who has his suspicions aroused. John and Tahmeena reconcile differences and bond over similarities in isolation. They work on a large jigsaw puzzle together, the "unfinished sky" giving the film its title. She is accepted by John's loyal dog, learns to drive the tractor and drop-kick a football. She later finds photos of an earlier John and his wife, a woman of similar appearance involved in those same activities; this sours her feelings towards him. They drive to Brisbane following a lead to her estranged daughter, which proves false and Tahmeena is distraught.

Their hesitant romantic relationship develops that night, but is interrupted by Potter and his brother Mike, who are intent on retrieving their "property", first shooting the dog. The intense conclusion involves a shoot-out in which John defends himself and Tahmeena. In the confusion Potter shoots his brother and is easily captured. Police Sergeant Allen arrives and Tahmeena recognises him as her attacker and Potter's accomplice. He gets the better of John but she strikes him from behind.

Later, John locates Tahmeena's daughter and brings her to Tahmeena in a refugee detention centre. The closing is unresolved but optimistic.

== Cast ==
- William McInnes as John Woldring
- Monic Hendrickx as Tahmeena
- Bille Brown as Bob Potter
- Christopher Sommers as Mike Potter
- David Field as Sergeant Carl Allen
- Sam Cotton as Angus
- Kristina Andersen as Supermarket Shopper
- Renai Caruso as Kate
- Zulaikha Deen as Shahla (6-year-old)
- Hannah Cocker as Shahla (11-year-old)
- Scott McRae as Policemen
- Roy Billing as Royce
- Mercia Deane-Johns as Barbara
- Philippa Coulthard as Rose

== Themes ==
Unfinished Sky is presented as a rebuttal of the contextual feelings regarding global influences, reflecting on the growing connection between regions such as Asia and the Middle East, with the underlying central political and social themes lending the film as an 'example of post-national cinema. With Tahmeena being an Afghan refugee, and having escaped from a brothel, the exploitation of humans through the sex trade or trafficking is centralised. This allows the film to reiterate the current issues regarding Australian immigration policy, with Peter Duncan commenting on how, "people have become more fearful of each other," in a post 9/11 world.

=== Fear of others ===
Discussed amongst scholars in its more blatant representation and innate didactic portrayal, given Duncan's desire for it to be centralised, the fear of others and/or of difference is a contextually relevant issue at the post 9/11 time of release. Revealed in the starting of the text, John, upon meeting Tahmeena, asks, "Are you Muslim? Islam? Taliban?", in which Khoo comments on the avoidance of these more politically divisive character traits, yet the inclusion questions the preordained perspectives that relate. Lambert further interrogates the underlining depiction relating to public perception of the ‘other’, citing John's change in point of view relating to Tahmeena as a "call for changes to the tone of official policy and action." However, McCarthy argues against this reframing of the protagonist, reconfirming the instant attraction relates to the matching appearance to that of his late wife. Continuing, McCarthy questions the importance of this specific theme, labelling "Tahmeena’s cultural specificity" as being ‘erased’ when in Australia, rendering the background of being Afghan as "entirely arbitrary". With this is mind, the framing of the fear of difference, and Duncan's didactic intention achieved through the reimagining of The Polish Bride seemingly falters, given a mere appropriation of culture, situating alternate identities as almost inferior to that of white culture. Khoo develops this idea, clinically classifying Hendrickx's portrayal as comparable to Downey Jnr's blackface in Tropic Thunder with respect to the power dynamics at play. Unfinished Sky's arguably most intrinsic theme seemingly erects what it attempts to dismantle, Khoo concludingly stating the notion as, "leaving one always on one side of the fence or the other."

=== Isolation ===
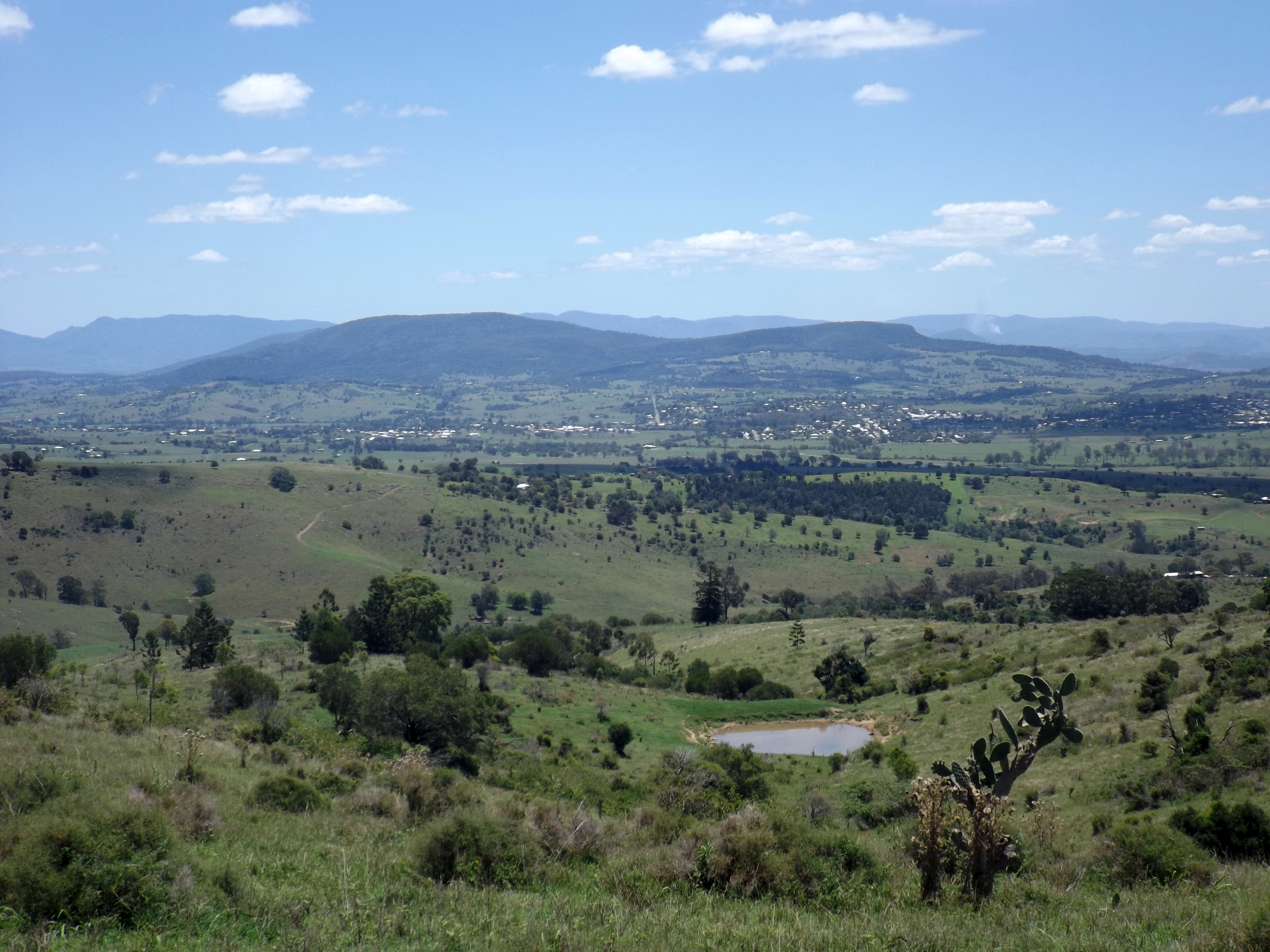
One of the principal filming locations, Boonah, Queensland

In his interview with Brian McFarlane, Duncan frames John's voluntary and borderline exile in the harsh Australian landscape as entrapped isolation; the film narrates the factors that separate and detach both John and Tahmeena. The title refers to John's unfinished jigsaw puzzle, which symbolises a man broken over the accusation of involvement in his wife's death. Duncan alludes to this metaphorically, observing that "we never have that last piece of the puzzle to put in - or if we do that's when we die." The title motif also reflects the unfinished relationship between John and Tahmeena. However, the two work together to complete the puzzle, suggesting a metaphorical recovery along with the ability to communicate wordlessly.

=== Contextual consequences ===
Besides a concern for an increasing fear of the unfamiliar, Duncan frames the film as a political and authorial undertone about growing distrust, more specifically the government's policy toward asylum seekers. Lambert comments that the film can "explore ... the limits of a seemingly new Australian sensitivity to others and to the environment." The ending of the film, in which Tahmeena stays, something that McCarthy notes as unrealistic contextually with respect to Australia's strict border protection policy, acts as both a catalyst reflection on reality and a hopeful, more ‘open’ Australia.

=== Overcoming fears ===
Lambert argues that Tahmeena's character lends itself to the softening of those who should be distrusted, citing Tascon in that the ‘love’ between John and Tahmeena "makes the welcome of the stranger possible in the deepest and riskiest manner." Here, Lambert allows for John to be reframed as a contextual Australian struck with sympathy, the completion puzzle simultaneously symbolising John's acceptance of Tahmeena in order to ‘solve’ his problems, as reiterated by Khoo. Once again, McCarthy offers a differing perspective, presenting the acceptance of the ‘other’ as that done so with an understood power imbalance, citing Tahmeena as a character plagued by childlike representations. Critics dispute whether Duncan's decision not always to subtitle Tahmeena's Arabic leaves her voiceless or reinforces the difference and need for John to overcome this.

=== Australian identity ===
Duncan and film critics such as Khoo and McCarthy discuss the film's text as a revaluation of Australian identity. Whilst originating as an adaptation of "The Polish Bride", Unfinished Sky represents a "changing era of globalised Australian cinema," according to Khoo, with the post-national and regional aspects making way for an identity of multiculturalist appreciation to be plausible. McCarthy specifically questions this notion, quoting disproportionate favouring of White Australians in this portrayal, succinctly commenting on the resulting attempts at a reimagination in, "The result is a contextualisation of multiculturalism as a form of national heritage within an overarching commitment to the idea." Unfinished Sky remains a multicultural text with its effectiveness in doing so heavily questioned; however, the individualised perception of the world from John calls for a broadening of spectrums, with the omission of subtitles subtlety highlighting one-dimensional approaches.

== Production ==
=== Development ===
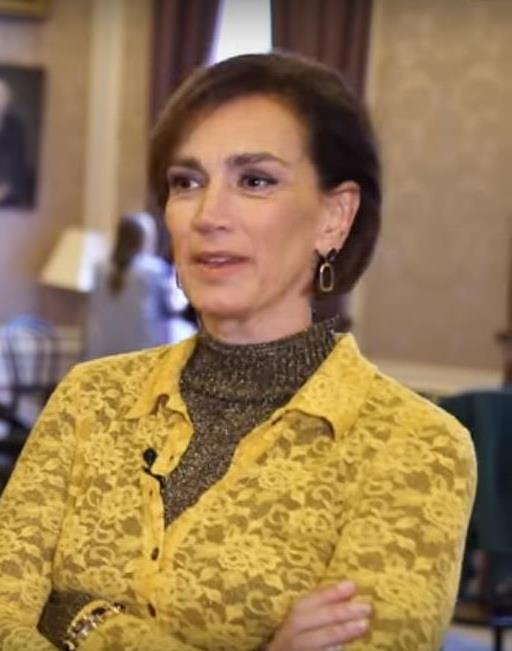
Monic Hendrickx (Tahmeena)

The involvement and investment of New Holland Pictures, a combination of the Dutch company responsible for the production The Polish Bride and an Australian pair, Cathy and Mark Overett, was vital in the creation of Unfinished Sky. Given that Unfinished Sky is loosely based on the 1998 Dutch film (The Polish Bride), the joint venture production company urged the consideration of Monic Hendrickx, who played the relevant counterpart to Tahmeena in The Polish Bride. This catalysed the casting of Monic Hendrickx, with Peter Duncan (director), although originally sceptical, ultimately impressed, recasting her in his culturally appropriated reimagining.

Peter Duncan adapted the Dutch film in an Australian setting in response to the impact of 9/11; it was shot mainly in Beaudesert, Queensland, south of Brisbane. In an interview with Matthew Pejkovic, Duncan describes the film as being ‘about overcoming those fears,’ in relation to his earlier comment on ‘how people have become more fearful of each other’; he thus highlights the central message of overcoming distrust of difference.

=== Cinematography ===
The cinematography of the film, headed by Robert Humphries, attempts to mimic the characterisation and interaction of the two protagonists. The film is split into two parts; the opening half is distinguished by a more tonally grey image, a result of a slight crushing of colour, reflecting the coarseness of interaction between the protagonists. In union with a primary use of hand-held camera, the first half of the film acts as an internal reflection of the more ‘abrasive’ relationship between Tahmeena and John. However, once the romantic subplot further develops, the camera movements increase in fluidity, courtesy of the increased use of the dolly, whilst the once dull colour spectrum becomes more saturated and richer.

Camera work is also used to metaphorically represent the characters' internal perceptions of the landscape. Duncan in an interview with Brian McFarlane says that the setting is related to John's perspective: "He’s so lost his sense of place that he doesn’t notice the beauty around him." Later sections of the film present the countryside in more vivid tones. Similarly for Tahmeena, the full extent of John's country house is not fully revealed to her at first; according to Duncan, "she is totally disorientated and can’t get a full picture of it."

== Release ==
The film was released globally on 19 June 2008 to a number of domestic film festivals, international screenings including Toronto and Dubai, with an earlier release of January 31 that year in the Netherlands. It grossed $151,695 from opening at 29 theatres, staying in cinemas for 28 weeks at a total of 40 theatres and grossing $748,376 worldwide, with the vast majority of revenue coming from the Australian release ($745,484).

== Reception ==
On Rotten Tomatoes, the film has an aggregate score of 89% based on 8 positive and 1 negative critic review, indicating critical acclaim.

Critic Richard Kuipers of Variety wrote a glowing review, calling it "an affecting character study for mature viewers."

The film was nominated for 10 Australian Film Institute Awards at its 2008 ceremony. It won three, including Best Screenplay, Best Actress (Monic Hendrickx) and Best Actor (William McInnes). The film received positive reviews and was generally well received by audiences. Its theatrical release also garnered many awards, namely; Duncan's win for Best Director, the Macquarie AFI Award for Best Adapted Screenplay, Best Editor (Suresh Ayyer), Best Screenplay and Best Music (Antony Partos) from Film Critics Circle of Australia and Best Director and Best Editing from IF Awards. Unfinished Sky was screened at the opening night of the 2008 Dungog Film Festival.

== See also ==
- Cinema of Australia
