= IF Magazine =

Australian film and television trade magazine

- Editor: Jackie Keast
- Categories: Australian film and television trade magazine
- Frequency: Bi-monthly
- Circulation: 13,000
- Publisher: Mark Kuban
- Founded: 1997
- Company: The Intermedia Group
- Country: Australia
- Based in: Sydney
- Language: English
- Website: if.com.au

IF Magazine, also known as Inside Film, IF: Australia's Filmmaker Magazine, and IF: The Magazine for Independent Filmmakers, is an Australian print and online trade publication for screen-content professionals in Australia and New Zealand.

== History ==
The magazine was founded in 1997 by Stephen Jenner and David Barda, in Sydney.

In April 2012 the 150th issue was published. In June 2021, the 200th issue was published.

Its former and long names include Inside Film, IF: Australia's Filmmaker Magazine, IF: The Magazine for Independent Filmmakers, and IF Magazine: For Screen Content Professionals.

== Description ==
IF Magazine is a bi-monthly print magazine as well as a website, if.com.au, serving as a trade publication for screen-content professionals in Australia and New Zealand.

The magazine's content includes original research in specially-commissioned articles that are unique. It covers Australian film and television, distribution, exhibition, digital media, marketing, finance, as well as detailed reporting on the Australian film industry.

The magazine is available online by subscription on Informit from Issue 41 (February 2002).

== Governance and people ==
Inside Film is owned by The Intermedia Group.

As of 2017 Jackie Keast is editor, while Don Groves has been senior journalist since 2013. Groves formerly worked with Variety in Sydney and London, and has contributed regularly to Deadline Hollywood and SBS Film.

== Recognition ==
In 2000, the magazine was the co-winner of the AACTA Byron Kennedy Award, along with Popcorn Taxi film festival.

== IF Awards ==
IF Magazine ran the IF Awards from 1999 until 2011, with various sponsors acquiring naming rights over the years. The awards were determined by a national audience poll, which differentiated it from the Australian AACTA Awards, which are judged by industry professionals. In 2012 it was announced that they would be put "on hold", owing to changing economic circumstances and competition with the AACTA Awards, which had moved to Sydney in 2011.
