= Dee McLachlan =

Australian film director

- Born: 25 January 1953 (age 73); Cape Town, South Africa
- Occupations: Film director, screenwriter and film producer
- Years active: 1990–98; 2007–present

Dee McLachlan (born Duncan McLachlan; January 1953) is a film director, producer and writer from St Kilda, Victoria. Under her assigned name, McLachlan directed such films as Scavengers, The Double 0 Kid, Running Wild, Deadly Chase and The Second Jungle Book: Mowgli & Baloo.

In 1999, McLachlan moved to Australia, where she publicly transitioned gender and changed her name to Dee. Her credits include The Jammed, a film for which she won IF Awards for Best Feature Film and Best Script She also received nominations for Best Editing at the IF Awards, Best Film, Best Direction and Best Original Screenplay at the AFI Awards, and for Best Director, Best Film and Best Screenplay at the FCCA awards She followed up The Jammed with 2012's 10 Terrorists.

== Filmography ==
- 2019 - 2099: Soldier Protocol (w Jackson Gallagher)
- 2017 - Out of the Shadows
- 2014 - Wentworth (TV series)
- 2012 - 10 Terrorists
- 2011 - Everest the Promise
- 2007 - The Jammed
- 1997 - The Second Jungle Book: Mowgli & Baloo
- 1995 - Running Wild
- 1993 - Deadly Chase
- 1993 - The Double 0 Kid

== Author ==
McLachlan founded Gumshoe News in 2013 and along with Mary W Maxwell has written and published over 2,000 articles. McLachlan and Maxwell have co-authored two books: Enough is Enough (on the Port Arthur massacre in Tasmania) and Truth in Journalism. Mclachlan has written five children's books.

In November 2023 Dee Mclachlan released her book "the child protection racket". Introduction: The book documents the unwarranted, unlawful, often forced removal of children from parents in Australia via secret closed “star chamber” style courts. Although it is a major global industry, Australia is a world leader in child removals. You as the reader can decide whether they are abducted, kidnapped, stolen and/or trafficked in a “cash for kids” trade. The system fosters a dysfunctional society by destroying families, eroding love, and disrupting the sacred mother-child bond. The cruelty imposed on these families is indescribable and still today remains largely hidden from the public.
