= Codgers =

2006 stage play by Don Reid

Codgers is a 2006 stage play by Don Reid that was later turned into a 2011 comedy film of the same name by Wayne Harrison. Reid created a companion play for Codgers entitled Biddies, released in 2012.

== The play ==
Codgers was developed as a play by Don Reid.

It toured regional New South Wales in 2008, and nationally in 2010.

=== Plot ===
The story follows five elderly men that meet weekly at their local gym to talk and spend time together. When a newcomer threatens their friendships, the group must overcome the temporary setbacks and find a way to overcome these new issues.

=== Reception ===
Performances of the play were positively received. The Sydney Morning Herald review said that it was a "pleasant, simple and heart-warming comedy about ageing and its possible wisdoms".

=== Awards ===
Reid won the 2006 Rodney Seaborn Playwrights Award of Codgers.

== Film adaptation ==
The play was adapted into a feature film directed by Wayne Harrison and starring Ronald Falk, Ron Haddrick, and Edwin Hodgeman.

The film premiered at the Parramatta Riverside Theatre on 24 June 2011, and was released to video on demand through Titan View in 2013.

== Biddies ==
In 2012 Reid released Biddies as a companion piece to Codgers. The play featured a similar plot device as its predecessor, centering on five older women and former schoolmates that are gathering together to sew a project for their former school. The play starred Maggie Blinco, Annie Byron, Vivienne Garrett, Julie Hudspeth, Donna Lee, and Linden Wilkinson, and received mixed reviews.
