= Men's Group =

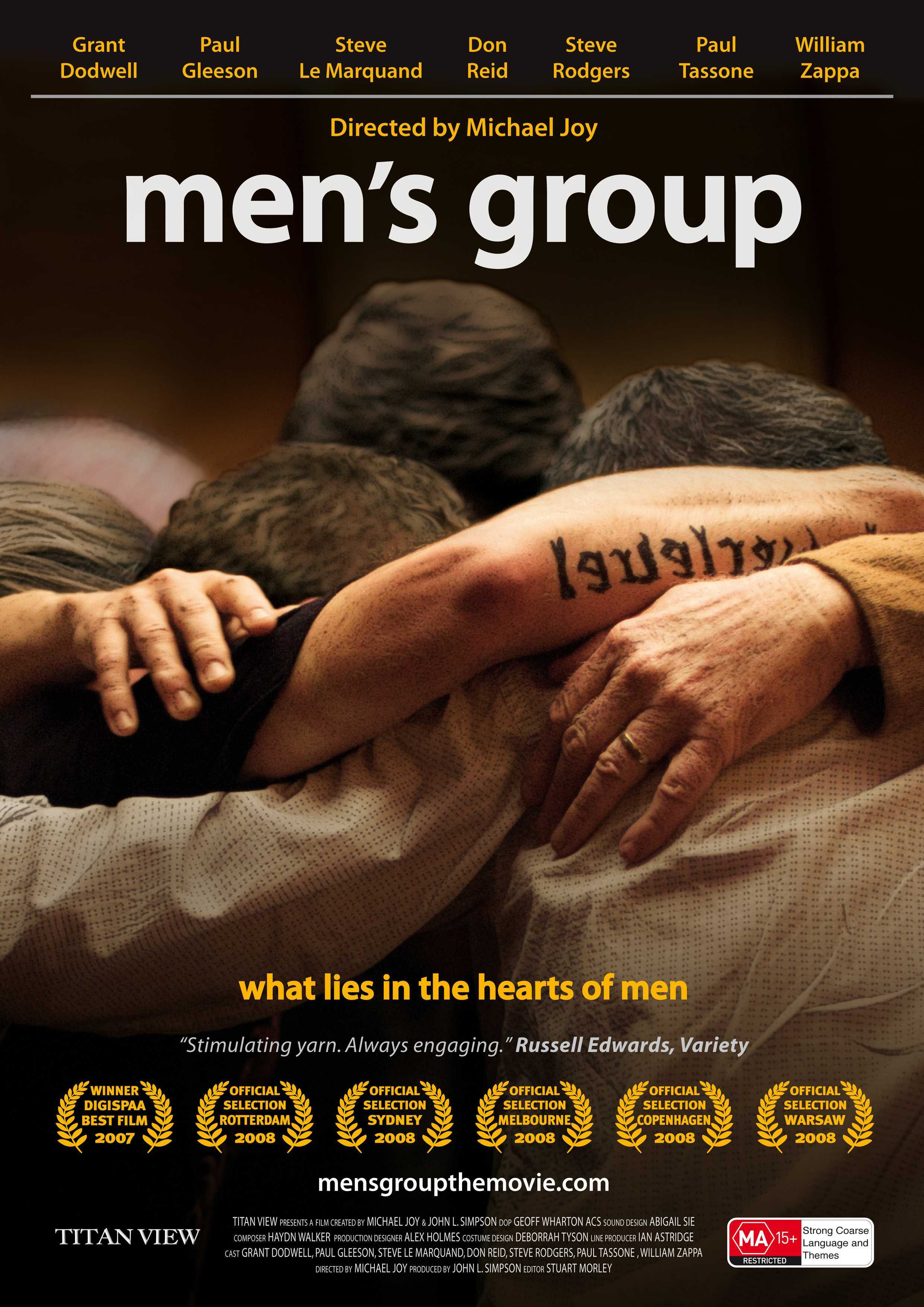
- Directed by: Michael Joy
- Written by: Michael Joy; John L. Simpson
- Produced by: John L. Simpson
- Starring: Grant Dodwell; Paul Gleeson; Steve Le Marquand; Don Reid; Steve Rodgers; Paul Tassone; William Zappa
- Cinematography: Geoffrey Wharton
- Edited by: Stuart Morley
- Music by: Haydn Walker
- Distributed by: Titan View
- Release date: 18 September 2008
- Running time: 104 minutes
- Country: Australia
- Language: English

Men's Group is a 2008 Australian drama film. The film is directed by Michael Joy from a screenplay co-written with John L. Simpson.

== Plot ==
The film follows the lives of six men over a period of months as they convene weekly in a self-help style group. Meeting at the home of Paul, the men include Freddy, a depressed stand-up comedian; the elderly Cecil; businessman Lucas; the bereaved Anthony; taciturn Moses; and talkative, middle-aged Alex. As trust grows between the men they gradually begin to open up and learn to listen to each other, discovering they are not alone in their fears as they had presumed. When a tragedy befalls the group, the men realize they must take responsibilities for their own lives and those of their loved ones.

== Cast ==
- Grant Dodwell as Alex
- Paul Gleeson as Paul
- Steve Le Marquand as Lucas
- Don Reid as Cecil
- Steve Rodgers as Freddy
- Paul Tassone as Moses
- William Zappa as Anthony

== Production ==
=== Development ===
The concept of the film was conceived by Michael Joy and John L. Simpson, while working together on another project dealing with men's issues and their inability to communicate. At that time, director Michael Joy was experiencing depression and attended a men's support group on the advice of a telephone counsellor. Joy was struck by the pain of the men in the room and the safe environment in which they could express what they were going through.

=== Filming ===
Joy worked with each of the actors separately, workshopping the script over two months. Using this technique, Michael and John L. would create scenes from key character points and events. Only then was a comprehensive screenplay drafted and delivered to the heads of departments.

The actors were not allowed to see the screenplay prior to shooting, and had little or no idea of other characters' story lines. The filmmakers did this to capture the actors' first responses to what was unfolding in front of them. There was only one take for each shot that appears in the film, and the shoot lasted only 14 days. It was shot in sequence, so the filmmakers could not go back to reshoot. Before each scene, Joy spent time talking to the actors quietly and individually about their lives at that point, trying to get them to speak about specific things that needed to happen in the film.

The film was a micro-budget production, created on a reverse finance model, with each key crew member and actor taking an equity position in the film.

== Reception ==
The film was praised and is particularly recognised for the strong performances by the lead actors. Anton Bitel of Eye for Film wrote the film "represents a refreshing examination of the collective male psyche through pure drama", and added the improvisational nature of the film results in an "ensemble performances of searing, warts-and-all realism, so utterly believable that viewers themselves will feel like silent members of the party, compelled by the power of the proceedings to watch, listen, learn – and maybe join in the conversation after the credits have rolled." On At the Movies, Margaret Pomeranz awarded the film four stars and David Stratton awarded it three and a half stars.

On review aggregator website Rotten Tomatoes, Men's Group has an approval rating of 86% based on 7 reviews.

== AFI Fellowship and Tour ==
Following the theatrical release of the film by Titan View, John L. Simpson was approached by men's health groups who wished to screen the film and use it as a tool to prompt discussions about men's mental health. With this interest, Simpson proposed to tour the film around Australia to non-theatrical venues for community group screenings, and in the process create a map of all venues in Australia suitable to screen from. For this proposal he was awarded the 2008 AFI Fellowship.

The program has allowed the film to tour to towns such as Tamworth, Armidale, Bellingen, Dorrigo, Bowraville, and Bowral. In early March 2009, Men’s Group was screened to men's and women's prisons in Tasmania.

== Awards and nominations ==
Film Critics Circle of Australia

- 2009: Nominated, Best Actor – Grant Dodwell

Inside Film Awards

- 2008: Won, Best Actor – Grant Dodwell
- 2008: Won, Best Feature Film – John L. Simpson, Michael Joy
- 2008: Won, Best Script – John L. Simpson, Michael Joy
- 2008: Nominated, Best Music – Haydn Walker
- 2008: DigiSPAA Award
