= St Arnou =

Former brewery in Sydney, Australia

St Arnou Pty Limited
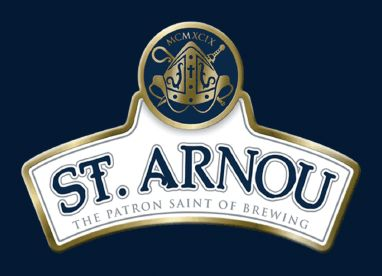
- Industry: Alcoholic beverage
- Founded: 2001
- Headquarters: Sydney, Australia
- Products: Beer
- Owner: St Arnou Brewing Pty Ltd

St Arnou was one of the first Australian craft beer companies established in 2001, located in Sydney, Australia, and privately owned. In 2002 the company opened its first brewpub at the Regatta Hotel in Brisbane. It closed between 2015 and 2017.

== History ==
In 1999, Brian Watson, opened the St Arnou Brewery Restaurant in Auckland, New Zealand. In July 2001 the business was incorporated into a new Australian brewing operation, St Arnou Limited, set up by Matthew Beggs. Watson became responsible for sales, marketing and production. The company is named after Saint Arnoul, the patron saint of hop-pickers and Belgian brewers.

Initially the company only offered draught beer however in 2006 they commenced bottling and distributing the St Arnou Premium Blonde, a Belgian-style pale lager. This was followed with the release of the St Arnou Pilsner and then the St Arnou Premium Light. The company entered into a national distribution arrangement with Margaret River winery, Watershed Premium Wines, which led to their products being widely available throughout Australia and Singapore. The company originally brewed its beers in Queensland and New South Wales, before utilising Australian Independent Brewers facilities in Smeaton Grange, near Sydney.

== Beers ==
- St Arnou Pilsner, Saaz hops tripled filtered full flavoured beer. Australian International Beer Awards winner 2002, 2003, 2006 & 2008; New Zealand International Beer Awards 2000 (Gold medal)
- St Arnou Premium Blonde, blend of premium barley and pale wheat malts. Australian International Beer Awards winner 2006 & 2008
- St Arnou Pale Ale, European styled ale. Australian International Beer Awards winner 2004, 2006; New Zealand International Beer Awards 2001 (Silver medal)
- St Arnou St Cloud, Belgium style, cloudy with a white head. Australian International Beer Awards winner 2004 & 2006; New Zealand International Beer Awards 2000 & 2001 (Gold medal)
- St Arnou Premium Light, Saaz Hops and extended maturation period, displays the character of a full strength beer. Australian International Beer Awards winner 2005, 2006 & 2008

== See also ==
- Australian pub
- Beer in Australia
- List of breweries in Australia
