= The Jammed =

2007 film by Dee McLachlan

- Directed by: Dee McLachlan
- Written by: Dee McLachlan
- Produced by: Dee McLachlan; Andrea Buck
- Starring: Emma Lung; Veronica Sywak; Saskia Burmeister; Sun Park
- Cinematography: Peter Falk
- Edited by: Anne Carter; Maryjeanne Watt
- Music by: Grant McLachlan
- Distributed by: Titan View
- Release date: 2007
- Running time: 89 minutes
- Country: Australia
- Language: English

The Jammed is a 2007 film written and directed by Dee McLachlan.

The film is a story about human trafficking and the sex slave trade in Melbourne, and the search for three girls trapped by a trafficking syndicate. Court transcripts and actual events were an influence in the production of the film.

The Jammed was nominated for seven AFI Awards, for four FCCA awards and for six IF Awards, winning for best feature film, best script and best music.

The film was favourably reviewed by David Stratton and Margaret Pomeranz. Its original distribution plan of a DVD release was altered soon after filmmaker and distributor John L Simpson of Titan View used his own home mortgage to release the film. It ended up screening on 40 screens in Australia and 10 in New Zealand.

== Plot ==
The film begins with an interrogation in an immigration office of an illegal immigrant working as a prostitute on the verge of being deported. Throughout the film it becomes apparent that one of the interrogators (Damien Richardson) has had sex with the girl at an illegal brothel, negating his encouragement to her to tell the truth.

The film then backtracks to three weeks before when Ashley (Veronica Sywack), a bored, single insurance clerk, unwittingly becomes involved when she meets a Chinese woman, Sunee (Amanda Ma), as a blind-date airport pickup goes wrong. We learn that Sunee is searching for her daughter, Rubi. Through the various flashbacks, we meet Crystal (Emma Lung), Vanya (Saskia Burmeister) and Rubi (Sun Park), who have all been enslaved in a Melbourne brothel on a premise of "working off their debt" of the cost of being trafficked to Australia using false papers.

== Cast ==
Actor	Role
Emma Lung	Crystal
Veronica Sywak	Ashley
Saskia Burmeister	Vanya
Amanda Ma	Sunee
Masa Yamaguchi	Dyce
Sun Park	Rubi
Gareth Yuen	Lai
Andrew S. Gilbert	Mr. Glassman
Alison Whyte	Mrs. Glassman
Anna Kim Anderson	Rose
Todd MacDonald	Tom
Cameron Nugent	Steve

== Reception ==
The film has been generally well received with praise for its frankness and cinematic telling of very serious true stories. Melbourne newspaper The Age said "The story rides on a strong undercurrent of information about the Melbourne sex slave trade, reflecting the extensive research that went into the film."

== Box office ==
The Jammed grossed $861,524 at the box office in Australia.
