= John L. Simpson =

Australian film producer (born 1963)

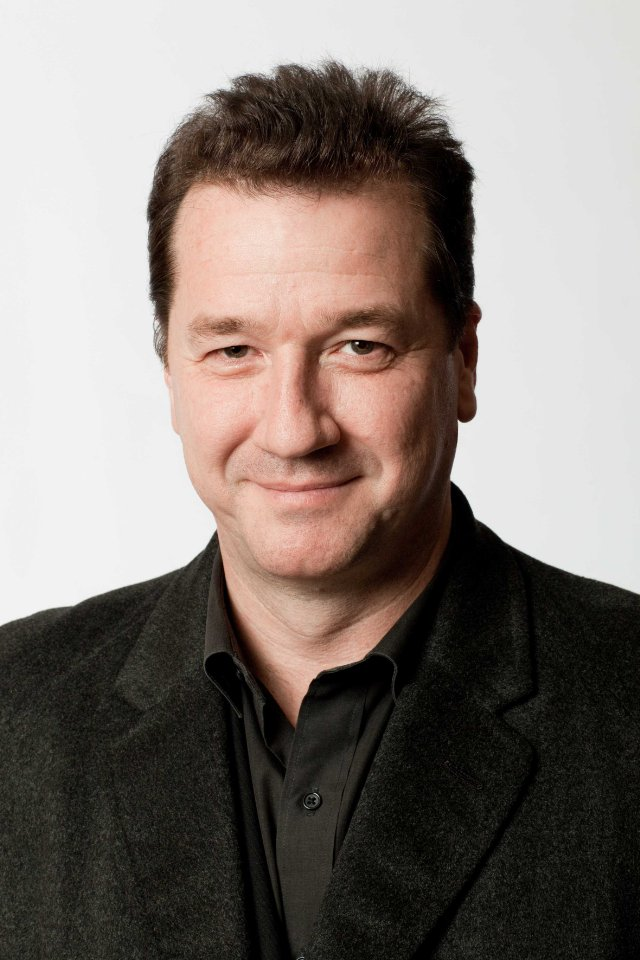
- Born: 2 September 1963 (age 63); Sydney, Australia
- Education: Epping Boys High School (1977–1982); UWS - Performing Arts, Major in Acting (1984–1986); AFTRS - Film & Television Production (2001–2002) Master of Screen Arts and Business (2015)
- Occupations: Founder & CEO Titan View
- Spouse: Maria Simpson

John L. Simpson (born 2 September 1963) is an Australian film and theatre producer and distributor.

== Early life ==
Simpson was born on September 2, 1963, in Sydney, Australia. He majored in acting at the University of Western Sydney, and also achieved a Master of Screen Arts and Business from Australian Film Television and Radio School.

== Career ==
Simpson first began his career as an actor and performed in various stage productions such as Les Misérables and Phantom of the Opera. He later began working as a theater producer in 1991 with the play My Black Heart. Simpson then moved into producing films such as Men's Group, his first independent film. He has become a regular speaker on low budget filmmaking models in Australia and is a current advisor to several film labs across the country, including the SA FilmLAB and Screen ACT’s Low Budget Feature Film Initiative. Simpson was also a board member of Screen Canberra from 2013 to 2017.

=== Titan View ===
In July 2007 Simpson founded the distribution company Titan View, which he formed in order to distribute the film The Jammed. Simpson mortgaged his house to create the company and distribute the film, which became the third highest-grossing screen average for an Australian film of all time during its first few weeks of release. Simpson received an AFI Fellowship in 2008 to tour the film Men's Group around Australia. The company has also received funding from Screen Australia in 2010 as part of their Innovative Distribution Funding project.

== Filmography ==
Year	Title	Role
2016	Joe Cinque's Consolation	Distributor
2015	Me and My Mates VS the Zombie Apocalypse	Executive Producer & Distributor
2014	That Crazy Reality Show	Distributor
2014	Locks of Love	Executive Producer & Distributor
2014	Rise of the Eco Warriors	Distributor
2013	Mclean's Money	Distributor
2013	War Matters	Distributor
2013	Miss Nikki and the Tiger Girls	Distributor
2013	11Eleven Project	Distributor
2012	Isolate (film)	Distributor
2012	Black & White & Sex	Distributor
2012	Bathing Franky	Distributor
2012	This is Roller Derby	Executive Producer & Distributor
2012	Codgers	Distributor
2012	Centreplace	Distributor
2011	33 Postcards	Marketing Director & Distributor
2010	Mother Fish	Distributor
2009	Into the Shadows	Self
2008	Blind Company	Distributor
2008	Three Blind Mice	Distributor
2008	Men's Group	Writer, Producer & Distributor
2007	The Jammed	Distributor
2007	Razzle Dazzle	Associate Producer
2004	Thunderstruck	Assistant to Producer, Post Production Coordinator

== Awards ==
- 2007 Digispaa, Won Spaartan Award
- 2008 Inside Film Award Won - Best Film (Men's Group)
- 2008 Inside Film Award Won - Best script (Men's Group)
