= Australian Government Film =

Film funding initiative

An Australian Government Film is an Australian film that has been funded by the Australian government at either a state or federal level. This type of film is distinct from an Australian independent film which has had no up-front government investment.

Most Australian films are funded by one or more of the state or federal film funding bodies such as Screen Australia, The NSW Film and Television Office, Film Victoria, ScreenWest, and The South Australian Film Corp.

(NB - may contain some independent films - the list is not yet completely researched)

Notable Australian Government Films of the 1940s-1950s:

- Kokoda Front Line! (1942) - First Australian film to win an Oscar, for Best Documentary Feature in 1942
- Conquest of The Rivers (1958) - AFI winner for Best Film (recruitment film for the Snowy Hydro scheme)

Notable Australian Government Films of the 1960s:

- The Dancing Class (1964) - AFI winner for Best Film
- I The Aboriginal (1964) - AFI winner for Best Film
- The Legend of Damien Parer (1965) - AFI winner for Best Film
- Stronger Since The War (1965) - AFI winner for Best Film
- Concerto for Orchestra (1966) - AFI winner for Best Film
- Cardin in Australia (1967) - AFI winner for Best Film
- The Change at Groote (1968) - AFI winner for Best Film
- The Talgai Skull (1968) - AFI winner for Best Film
- Jack and Jill: A Postscript (1969) - AFI winner for Best Film

Notable Australian Government Films of the 1970s:

- Three To Go: Michael (1970) - AFI winner for Best Film
- Homesdale (1971) - AFI winner for Best Film
- Marco Polo Jr. Versus the Red Dragon (1972) - Australia's first animated feature film.
- Sunday Too Far Away (1975) - AFI winner for Best Film, acclaimed for its realism in character portrayal
- Picnic at Hanging Rock (1975) - One of the first Australian films to reach an International audience, based on a book of the same title
- The Devil's Playground (1976) - AFI winner for Best Film
- The Chant of Jimmie Blacksmith (1976) - A multi-award winning film
- Storm Boy (1977) - AFI winner for Best Film
- The Getting of Wisdom (1977) - Nominated for 5 AFI Awards and winner of Best Adapted Screenplay
- Newsfront (1978) - Winner of 8 AFI awards including Best Film and Best Actor: Bill Hunter.
- Mouth to Mouth (1978) - AFI Nominee Kim Krejus
- My Brilliant Career (1979) - AFI winner for Best Film

== 1980s ==
Notable Australian Government Films of the 1980s:

- 'Breaker' Morant (1980) - Nominated for an Oscar (for Best Screenplay), AFI winner for Best Film
- Running on Empty (1982) - Drag racing film
- Careful, He Might Hear You (1983) - AFI winner for Best Film
- Annie's Coming Out (1984) - AFI winner for Best Film
- Bliss (1985) - AFI winner for Best Film
- Malcolm (1986) - AFI winner for Best Film. One of the first films starring Colin Friels.
- The Lighthorsemen, a 1987 feature film about an Australian Light Horse unit
- The Year My Voice Broke (1987) - Often cited by film critics as the best Australian film in the past 25 years., AFI winner for Best Film
- Dogs in Space (1987) - A cult film set in the post-punk "little band scene" in Melbourne in 1979.
- Evil Angels (A Cry in the Dark) (1989) - AFI winner for Best Film and Meryl Streep Best Actress Oscar Nominee
- Houseboat Horror (1989) - featuring Alan Dale from Neighbours

== 1990s ==
The 1990s saw the release of the cult classics The Adventures of Priscilla, Queen of the Desert in 1994 and The Castle in 1997. Strictly Ballroom was also a successful and influential release.

Notable Australian Government Films of the 1990s:

- Flirting (1990) - AFI winner for Best Film
- Proof (1991) - AFI winner for Best Film, one of the first major films starring Russell Crowe and Hugo Weaving.
- Romper Stomper (1992) - A multi-award winning film, one of the first major films starring Russell Crowe.
- Strictly Ballroom (1992) - Nominated for Golden Globe, with additional 16 wins and 11 further nominations. AFI winner for Best Film
- The Piano (1993) - New Zealand co-production, won 3 Oscars and received a further 5 nominations. AFI winner for Best Film
- Bad Boy Bubby (1994) - Won four AFI awards; Best Director (Rolf de Heer), Best Actor in a Leading Role (Nicholas Hope), Best Original Screenplay and Best Editing.
- Muriel's Wedding (1994) - AFI winner for Best Film with worldwide success, one of the first films introducing Toni Collette and Rachel Griffiths
- The Adventures of Priscilla, Queen of the Desert (1994) - A cult classic, now a performing musical production. The first large-scale appearance of Guy Pearce and Hugo Weaving.
- Angel Baby (1995) - AFI winner for Best Film
- Babe (1995) - Won an Oscar, for Best Achievement in Visual Effects and nominated a further six
- Così - AFI winner for best screenplay; 2 other nominations. Ensemble piece starring Barry Otto, Toni Collette, David Wenham and Ben Mendelsohn.
- Shine (1996) - AFI winner for Best Film, Geoffrey Rush won Best Actor Oscar
- Idiot Box (1996) - Ben Mendelsohn & Jeremy Sims star
- Hotel de Love (1996) - Aden Young, Saffron Burrows
- Love and Other Catastrophes (1996) - nominated for 5 AFI awards
- Dating the Enemy (1996) - Guy Pearce and Claudia Karvan star
- Kiss or Kill (1997) - AFI winner for Best Film
- Doing Time for Patsy Cline (1997) - 10 AFI nominations winner of 4 (inc. Best Actor)
- Blackrock (1997) - Nominated for 5 AFI awards and the movie debut of Heath Ledger
- Crackers (1998)
- The Boys (1998) - Nominated for 13 AFI awards, winner of 5, including Best Director
- The Interview (1998) - AFI winner for Best Film
- Paperback Hero (1998) - Hugh Jackman, Claudia Karvan
- Two Hands (1999) - AFI winner for Best Film

== 2000s ==
2000s in the history of Australian film has had some mixed successful films from Moulin Rouge! revitalizing the musical film genre, award-winning short film Harvie Krumpet, and box office success Happy Feet.

Notable Australian Government Films of the 2000s:

- The Dish (2000) - An internationally successful film which presents a somewhat fictionalised account of the Parkes Observatory's role in the Apollo 11 Moon landing.
- Bootmen (2000) - A multi-award winning film, one of the first films starring Sam Worthington and Adam Garcia
- Better Than Sex (2000) - David Wenham, Susie Porter
- Chopper (2000) - A multi-award winning influential film based on the character of Mark Brandon "Chopper" Read
- Looking for Alibrandi (2000) - AFI winner for Best Film
- The Bank (2001) - Hi-Tech Thriller capitalising on strong anti-bank sentiment.
- Silent Partner (2001) - A low budget - almost no-budget - film that offers an excellent and sensitive study about mateship between two losers.
- Lantana (2001) - AFI winner for Best Film
- Moulin Rouge! (2001) - Widely credited with revitalising the musical genre and has won 7 major awards and a further 10 nominations.
- The Man Who Sued God (2001) - AFI nomination for Best Original Screenplay (Don Watson), starring Billy Connolly, Judy Davis and Colin Friels.
- One Night the Moon (2001) - AFI winner and New York International Independent Film & Video Festival Genre award winner. A musical (winner, Screen Music Awards, Australia) based on the true story of a young girl who went missing in the Australian outback in 1932.
- WillFull (2001) - The willful ghost of a parent returns.
- The Tracker (2002) - AFI winner for Best Actor: David Gulpilil
- Rabbit-Proof Fence (2002) - AFI winner for Best Film. Based on the book Follow the Rabbit-Proof Fence and stirred debate over its historical accuracy.
- Dirty Deeds (2002) - 3 wins and 9 nominations.
- The Hard Word (2002) - 5 wins and 8 nominations.
- Swimming Upstream (2002) - Geoffrey Rush, Judy Davis, Jesse Spencer, Tim Draxl
- Harvie Krumpet (2003) - Won Oscar, for Best Short Film (Animated)
- Gettin' Square (2003) - AFI winner for Best Film AFI winner for Best Actor: David Wenham
- Take Away (2003)
- Japanese Story (2003) - AFI winner for Best Film
- Undead (2003)
- On the Beach (2004) - 2 AFI Nominations (Armand Assante, Rachel Ward, Bryan Brown, Jaqueline McKenzie, Grant Bowler, Steve Bastoni)
- Love's Brother (2004)
- Strange Bedfellows (2004)
- Somersault (2004) - AFI winner for Best Film
- Wolf Creek (2005) - Seven AFI Nominations - including Best Director (John Jarratt, Nathan Phillips)
- Look Both Ways (2005) - AFI winner for Best Film
- The Proposition (2005)
- The Illustrated Family Doctor (2005) - Samuel Johnson, Colin Friels, Jessica Napier, Sacha Horler
- Three Dollars (2005) - Based on the novel by Elliot Perlman and starring David Wenham and Frances O'Connor.
- Little Fish (2005) - Cate Blanchett, Hugo Weaving and Noni Hazlehurst all won AFI awards for this film set in Sydney.
- Opal Dream (2006) - Vince Colosimo, Jacqueline McKenzie, Christian Byers, Sapphire Boyce
- Ten Canoes (2006) - First film made with entirely native Australian Aboriginal spoken languages. AFI winner for Best Film.
- Candy (2006) - Abbie Cornish, Heath Ledger and Geoffrey Rush in a film about love and how drugs affect your life.
- Jindabyne (2006) - Laura Linney & Gabriel Byrne in a film set in Jindabyne.
- Happy Feet (2006) - The most expensive Australian film made, was the first Australian film to win an Oscar for Best animated feature film.
- Who Killed Dr Bogle and Mrs Chandler? (2006) - Answer to Australia's largest murder mystery and winner of Most Outstanding Documentary in the 2007 Logies.
- Last Train to Freo (2006)
- Kokoda (2006)
- Romulus, My Father (2007) - Australian Film Institute Award for Best Film winner starring Eric Bana.
- Lucky Miles (2007)
- Clubland (2007)
- Noise (2007)
- Rogue (2007)
- December Boys (2007) - Based on the book, starring Daniel Radcliffe.
- Newcastle (2008) Australian surfing drama film set in the New South Wales city of Newcastle.
- The Square (2008) - Nominated for 7 AFI awards including Best Picture, Best Director and Best Actor. Winner 2008 IF Awards - Best Sound.
- The Black Balloon (2008) - Featuring Toni Collette, Gemma Ward.
- Unfinished Sky (2008)
- Among Dead Men (2008) - Winner 2008 Action on Film Festival's Best Fight Choreography
- Australia (2008) - a Baz Luhrmann Film starring Nicole Kidman, Hugh Jackman.
- Balibo (2009)
- Samson and Delilah (2009) - Cannes Camera D'or winner.
- Beautiful Kate (2009)
- Mary and Max (2009)
- Charlie & Boots (2009)
- Offside (2009)

== 2010s ==
- Bran Nue Dae (2010)
- Animal Kingdom (2010)
- Tomorrow, When the War Began (2010)
- Daybreakers (2010) - starring Ethan Hawke, Sam Neill, Willem Dafoe, Isabel Lucas and Vince Colosimo
- I Love You Too (2010) - written by Peter Helliar, starring Peter Helliar, Yvonne Strahovski, Peter Dinklage and Brendan Cowell
- Red Hill (2010)
- Wog Boy 2: Kings of Mykonos (2010)
- The Reef (2010)
- Sanctum (2011) Employed Executive Producer James Cameron for 3D effects. One of the most successful Australian films at the box office.
- Snowtown (2011)
- Red Dog (2011)
- Little Johnny: The Movie (2011)
- Any Questions for Ben? (2012)
