= Film Critics Circle of Australia Awards 2011 =

Australian film award

19th FCCA Awards

13 March 2011

Best Film:
Animal Kingdom

The 19th Film Critics Circle of Australia Awards, honoring the best in films from 2010, were presented on 13 March 2011 at North Sydney Leagues Club in Cammeray, New South Wales and hosted by Rod Quinn. The nominees were announced on 8 February 2011 with Animal Kingdom receiving ten nominations. Animal Kingdom won six awards, including Best Film and Best Director.

== Winners ==
Winners are listed first and highlighted in boldface.

=== Best Film ===
- **Animal Kingdom – Liz Watts**
- Beneath Hill 60 – Bill Leimbach
- Bran Nue Dae – Robyn Kershaw, Graeme Isaac
- Tomorrow, When the War Began – Andrew Mason, Michael Boughen
- The Waiting City – Jamie Hilton, Claire McCarthy

=== Best Director ===
- **David Michôd – Animal Kingdom**
- Stuart Beattie – Tomorrow, When the War Began
- Claire McCarthy – The Waiting City
- Rachel Perkins – Bran Nue Dae
- Jeremy Sims – Beneath Hill 60

=== Best Actress ===
- **Jacki Weaver – Animal Kingdom**
- Lily Bell-Tindley – Lou
- Radha Mitchell – The Waiting City
- Miranda Otto – South Solitary

=== Best Actor ===
- **Ben Mendelsohn – Animal Kingdom**
- Brendan Cowell – Beneath Hill 60
- Joel Edgerton – The Waiting City
- James Frecheville – Animal Kingdom
- Ryan Kwanten – Red Hill

=== Best Supporting Actress ===
- **Essie Davis – South Solitary**
- Emily Barclay – Lou
- Morgana Davies – The Tree
- Deborah Mailman – Bran Nue Dae

=== Best Supporting Actor ===
- **Joel Edgerton – Animal Kingdom**
- Steve Le Marquand – Beneath Hill 60
- Guy Pearce – Animal Kingdom
- Kodi Smit-McPhee – Matching Jack

=== Best Screenplay ===
- **David Michôd – Animal Kingdom** (original)
- **David Roach – Beneath Hill 60** (adapted)
- Stuart Beattie – Tomorrow, When the War Began
- Belinda Chayko – Lou
- Claire McCarthy – The Waiting City

=== Best Cinematography ===
- **Denson Baker – The Waiting City**
- Anna Howard – South Solitary
- Ben Nott – Tomorrow, When the War Began
- Toby Oliver – Beneath Hill 60

=== Best Editor ===
- **Dany Cooper – Beneath Hill 60**
- Marcus D'Arcy – Tomorrow, When the War Began
- Luke Doolan – Animal Kingdom
- Patrick Hughes – Red Hill
- Veronika Jenet – The Waiting City

=== Best Music Score ===
- **Cezary Skubiszewski – Bran Nue Dae**
- Mary Finsterer – South Solitary
- Antony Partos, Sam Petty – Animal Kingdom
- Cezary Skubiszewski – Beneath Hill 60
- Michael Yezerski – The Waiting City

=== Best Foreign Film – English Language ===
- **The Social Network**
- Inception
- The King's Speech
- Winter's Bone

=== Best Foreign Language Film ===
- **The White Ribbon**
- Father of My Children
- A Prophet
- The Secret in Their Eyes
