= AACTA Award for Best Editing =

Australian film award

- Country: Australia
- Presented by: Australian Academy of Cinema and Television Arts (AACTA)
- First award: 1967
- Currently held by: Martin Connor, Lee Smith, Spencer Susser, Jeff Groth, and Patrick Correll, Better Man (2024)
- Website: http://www.aacta.org

The AACTA Award for Best Editing is an award presented by the Australian Academy of Cinema and Television Arts (AACTA), a non-profit organisation whose aim is to "identify, award, promote and celebrate Australia's greatest achievements in film and television." The award is presented at the annual AACTA Awards, which hand out accolades for achievements in feature film, television, documentaries and short films. From 1976 to 2010, the category was presented by the Australian Film Institute (AFI), the Academy's parent organisation, at the annual Australian Film Institute Awards (known as the AFI Awards). When the AFI launched the Academy in 2011, it changed the annual ceremony to the AACTA Awards, with the current award being a continuum of the AFI Award for Best Editing.

Best Cinematography was first presented in 1976 with the winner being chosen by the Film Editors Guild of Australia (FEGA). The award is presented to the editor of a film that is Australian-made, or with a significant amount of Australian content. William M. Anderson and Jill Bilcock have won the award four times each, more than any other editor.

== Winners and nominees ==
Year	Film	Editor(s)
1960s
1967	Cardin in Australia	N/A
1968	The Change at Groote	Stefan Sargent
1969	And Then There Was Glass	Peter Tammer
1970s
1970	Big Island	Rod Adamson
1971/2	N/A	N/A
1973	One Hundred a Day	David Stiven
1974/5	N/A	N/A
1976	End Play	Edward McQueen-Mason
1976	Caddie	Tim Wellburn
1976	The Devil's Playground	Brian Kavanagh
1976	Promised Woman	David Stiven
1977	Don's Party	William M. Anderson
1977	Deathcheaters	Ron Williams
1977	The Fourth Wish	Gerard Turney-Smith
1977	Oz	Les Luxford
1978	Newsfront	John Scott
1978	The Chant of Jimmie Blacksmith	Brian Kavanagh
1978	The Last Wave	Max Lemon
1978	Patrick	Edward McQueen-Mason
1979	Mad Max	Cliff Hayes and Tony Paterson
1979	Money Movers	William M. Anderson
1979	My Brilliant Career	Nicholas Beauman
1979	The Odd Angry Shot	Brian Kavanagh
1980s
1980	Breaker Morant	William M. Anderson
1980	The Chain Reaction	Tim Wellburn
1980	Harlequin	Adrian Carr
1980	Stir	Henry Dangar
1981	Gallipoli	William M. Anderson
1981	Fatty Finn	Robert Gibson
1981	Hoodwink	Nicholas Beauman
1981	Roadgames	Edward McQueen-Mason
1982	Mad Max 2	Michael Balson, George Miller, Christopher Plowright, David Stiven and Tim Wellburn
1982	Heatwave	John Scott
1982	Monkey Grip	David Huggett
1982	Next of Kin	Max Lemon
1983	Phar Lap	Tony Paterson
1983	Careful, He Might Hear You	Richard Francis-Bruce
1983	Undercover	Tim Wellburn
1983	The Year of Living Dangerously	William M. Anderson
1984	Razorback	William M. Anderson
1984	BMX Bandits	Alan Lake
1984	My First Wife	Tim Lewis
1984	Strikebound	Jill Bilcock
1985	Frog Dreaming	Brian Kavanagh
1985	Bliss	Wayne LeClos
1985	The Coca-Cola Kid	John Scott
1985	Rebel	Michael Honey
1986	Malcolm	Ken Sallows
1986	The Fringe Dwellers	Tim Wellburn
1986	Playing Beatie Bow	Andrew Prowse
1986	Short Changed	Richard Francis-Bruce
1987	Ground Zero	David Pulbrook
1987	Bullseye	Richard Francis-Bruce
1987	The Umbrella Woman	John Scott
1987	The Year My Voice Broke	Neil Thumpston
1988	The Navigator: A Medieval Odyssey	John Scott
1988	Boulevard of Broken Dreams	Philip Reid
1988	The Dreaming	Suresh Ayyar
1988	Grievous Bodily Harm	Marc van Buuren
1989	Dead Calm	Richard Francis-Bruce
1989	Evil Angels	Jill Bilcock
1989	Ghosts... of the Civil Dead	Stewart Young
1989	Island	John Scott
1990s
1990	Flirting	Robert Gibson
1990	The Crossing	Henry Dangar
1990	Golden Braid	Russell Hurley
1990	Two Brothers Running	Robert Gibson
1991	Proof	Ken Sallows
1991	Dingo	Suresh Ayyar
1991	Spotswood	Nicholas Beauman
1991	Waiting	Michael Honey
1992	Strictly Ballroom	Jill Bilcock
1992	Black Robe	Tim Wellburn
1992	The Last Days of Chez Nous	Nicholas Beauman
1992	Romper Stomper	Bill Murphy
1993	The Piano	Veronika Jenet
1993	The Custodian	Michael Honey
1993	Map of the Human Heart	John Scott and George Akers
1993	Resistance	Stewart Young
1994	Bad Boy Bubby	Suresh Ayyar
1994	Body Melt	Bill Murphy
1994	Muriel's Wedding	Jill Bilcock
1994	The Sum of Us	Frans Vandenburg
1995	Angel Baby	Dany Cooper
1995	Hotel Sorrento	David Pulbrook
1995	Mushrooms	Henry Dangar
1995	Vacant Possession	Veronika Jenet
1996	Shine	Pip Karmel
1996	Cosi	Nicholas Beauman
1996	Life	Bill Murphy
1996	Love and Other Catastrophes	Ken Sallows
1997	Kiss or Kill	Henry Dangar
1997	Idiot Box	Mark Perry
1997	Thank God He Met Lizzie	Suresh Ayyar
1997	The Well	Dany Cooper
1998	Head On	Jill Bilcock
1998	The Boys	Nick Meyers
1998	The Interview	Suresh Ayyar
1998	Radiance	James Bradley
1999	Two Hands	Lee Smith
1999	Fresh Air	Suresh Ayyar
1999	Praise	Alexandre de Franceschi
1999	Siam Sunset	Nicholas Beauman
2000s
2000	Looking for Alibrandi	Martin Connor
2000	Bootmen	Jane Moran
2000	Chopper	Ken Sallows
2000	Me Myself I	Denise Haratzis
2001	Moulin Rouge!	Jill Bilcock
2001	Lantana	Karl Sodersten
2001	La Spagnola	Alexandre De Franceshi
2001	Yolngu Boy	Ken Sallows
2002	Walking on Water	Reva Childs
2002	Dirty Deeds	Mark Perry
2002	Rabbit-Proof Fence	Veronika Jenet and John Scott
2002	The Tracker	Tania Nehme
2003	Japanese Story	Jill Bilcock
2003	Alexandra's Project	Tania Nehme
2003	Gettin' Square	Ken Sallows
2003	Ned Kelly	Jon Gregory
2004	Somersault	Scott Gray
2004	The Old Man Who Read Love Stories	Tania Nehme
2004	One Perfect Day	Gary Woodyard
2004	Tom White	Ken Sallows
2005 (47th)	Little Fish	Alexandre de Franceschi and John Scott
2005 (47th)	Look Both Ways	Denise Haratzis
2005 (47th)	The Proposition	Jon Gregory
2005 (47th)	Wolf Creek	Jason Ballantine
2006 (48th)	Ten Canoes	Tania Nehme
2006 (48th)	Candy	Dany Cooper
2006 (48th)	Kenny	Clayton Jacobson and Sean Lander
2006 (48th)	Suburban Mayhem	Stephen Evans
2007 (49th)	The Home Song Stories	Denise Haratzis
2007 (49th)	Clubland	Scott Gray
2007 (49th)	Noise	Geoff Hitchins
2007 (49th)	Romulus, My Father	Suresh Ayyar
2008 (50th)	The Black Balloon	Veronika Jenet
2008 (50th)	Black Water	Rodrigo Balart
2008 (50th)	The Jammed	Anne Carter and Maryjeanne Watt
2008 (50th)	Unfinished Sky	Suresh Ayyar
2009 (51st)	Balibo	Nick Meyers
2009 (51st)	Blessed	Jill Bilcock
2009 (51st)	Mao's Last Dancer	Mark Warner
2009 (51st)	Samson and Delilah	Roland Gallois
2010s
2010 (52nd)	Animal Kingdom	Luke Doolan
2010 (52nd)	Beneath Hill 60	Dany Cooper
2010 (52nd)	Bright Star	Alexandre de Franceschi
2010 (52nd)	Tomorrow, When the War Began	Marcus D'Arcy
AACTA Awards
2011 (1st)	Snowtown	Veronika Jenet
2011 (1st)	Oranges and Sunshine	Dany Cooper
2011 (1st)	Red Dog	Jill Bilcock
2011 (1st)	Wasted on the Young	Leanne Cole
2012 (2nd)	The Sapphires	Dany Cooper
2012 (2nd)	Burning Man	Martin Connor
2012 (2nd)	Wish You Were Here	Jason Ballantine
2012 (2nd)	X: Night of Vengeance	Cindy Clarkson
2013 (3rd)	The Great Gatsby	Matt Villa, Jason Ballantine and Jonathan Redmond
2013 (3rd)	Mystery Road	Ivan Sen
2013 (3rd)	The Rocket	Nick Meyers
2013 (3rd)	The Turning	The Turning Ensemble
2014 (4th)	Predestination	Matt Villa
2014 (4th)	52 Tuesdays	Bryan Mason
2014 (4th)	The Babadook	Simon Njoo
2014 (4th)	The Water Diviner	Matt Villa
2015 (5th)	Mad Max: Fury Road	Margaret Sixel
2015 (5th)	Cut Snake	Andy Canny
2015 (5th)	The Dressmaker	Jill Bilcock
2015 (5th)	Holding the Man	Dany Cooper
2016 (6th)	Hacksaw Ridge	John Gilbert
2016 (6th)	The Daughter	Veronika Jenet
2016 (6th)	Girl Asleep	Karryn de Cinque
2016 (6th)	Goldstone	Ivan Sen
2017 (7th)	Lion	Alexandre de Franceschi
2017 (7th)	Australia Day	Nick Meyers
2017 (7th)	Berlin Syndrome	Jack Hutchings
2017 (7th)	Hounds of Love	Merlin Eden
2018 (8th)	Sweet Country	Nick Meyers
2018 (8th)	Breath	Dany Cooper
2018 (8th)	Ladies in Black	Mark Warner
2018 (8th)	Upgrade	Andy Canny
2019 (9th)	Hotel Mumbai	Peter McNulty and Anthony Maras
2019 (9th)	Judy and Punch	Dany Cooper
2019 (9th)	The King	Peter Sciberras
2019 (9th)	The Nightingale	Simon Njoo
2020s
2020 (10th)	The Invisible Man	Andy Canny
2020 (10th)	Babyteeth	Steve Evans
2020 (10th)	I Am Woman	Dany Cooper
2020 (10th)	True History of the Kelly Gang	Nick Fenton
2020 (10th)	Undertow	Julie-Anne De Ruvo and Nick Meyers
2021 (11th)	Nitram	Nick Fento
2021 (11th)	The Dry	Alexandre de Franceschi and Nick Meyers
2021 (11th)	Friends and Strangers	James Vaughan
2021 (11th)	High Ground	Jill Bilcock, Karryn de Cinque and Hayley Miro Browne
2021 (11th)	Peter Rabbit 2: The Runaway	Matt Villa
2022 (12th)	Elvis	Matt Villa and Jonathan Redmond
2022 (12th)	Blaze	Dany Cooper
2022 (12th)	Nude Tuesday	Nick Meyers
2022 (12th)	The Stranger	Simon Njoo
2022 (12th)	Three Thousand Years of Longing	Margaret Sixel
2023 (13th)	Talk to Me	Geoff Lamb
2023 (13th)	Carmen	Dany Cooper
2023 (13th)	The New Boy	Nick Meyers
2023 (13th)	Scarygirl	Michelle McGilvray, Matt Villa and Courtney Teixera
2023 (13th)	Sweet As	Katie Flaxman
2024 (14th)	Better Man	Martin Connor, Lee Smith, Spencer Susser, Jeff Groth and Patrick Correll
2024 (14th)	Force of Nature: The Dry 2	Alexandre de Franceschi and Maria Papoutsis
2024 (14th)	Furiosa: A Mad Max Saga	Eliot Knapman and Margaret Sixel
2024 (14th)	Late Night with the Devil	Colin Cairnes and Cameron Cairnes
2024 (14th)	Memoir of a Snail	Bill Murphy

== See also ==
- Australian Screen Editors
