= Dinka Džubur =

Australian actress, model and filmmaker

- Born: Slavonski Brod, SR Croatia, SFR Yugoslavia
- Education: University of Queensland; Queensland University of Technology
- Occupations: Actress, Model, Film Producer, Screenwriter, Activist
- Known for: Battle of the Sexes, True Blood, Secrets and Lies, Little Hands
- Height: 5 ft 9 in (175 cm)
- Website: www.dinkadzubur.net

Dinka Džubur (Croatian pronunciation: [dinka dʒǔbur]) is an Australian actress, model and filmmaker.

== Early life and education ==
Dinka was born in Slavonski Brod, Croatia (then Yugoslavia), the daughter of Bosniak father Ramiz, a worker in the technical engineering field, and Croatian mother Katarina, a businesswoman. Dinka was a professional gymnast growing up.

After the outbreak of the Yugoslav Wars during Dinka's childhood, Dinka moved frequently, with stints living in different parts of Croatia and Germany. She changed a number of countries and schools before settling in Australia. Dinka referred to this period stating that her "sports mindset helped her overcome the difficulties of a fast-changing reality and a childhood affected by war". She attended Keebra Park State High School on the Gold Coast in Queensland. Dinka completed a Bachelor of Journalism at the University of Queensland after which she was accepted into Queensland University of Technology Acting Department in Brisbane where she graduated with a Bachelor of Fine Arts in Acting degree. Dinka is bilingual and speaks fluent Croatian, German and has an ear for accents.

== Career ==
=== Modeling ===
Aged 16, Dinka was noticed by fashion scouts and first signed with Elite Model Management in Australia. She received considerable commercial exposure after a series of Australian print and TV ads for brands such as Billabong, The Corner Shop, She Swimwear amongst others. This increased her profile in the Australian market, after which Džubur relocated to Los Angeles.

In Los Angeles, Džubur had a multitude of runway appearances and was booked for various TV and print campaigns for major labels, including Tom Ford, Lancome, Project Runway's Kini Zamora and Gordana Gehlhausen.

In 2015, Dinka participated in Los Angeles and Style Fashion Weeks.

Dinka appeared in music videos by recording artists such as Bob Dylan, David Guetta and Nelly Furtado.

Džubur was also booked for print in magazines such as Elle, Vogue, Grazia and graced the Australian cover of Ocean Road Magazine in the summer 2018 edition with the cover-story "Australian Modern-Day Heroine".

=== Acting ===
Dinka started off her TV career on HBO's True Blood, followed by Australian drama series Secrets and Lies and Croatian telenovela for MediaPro Pictures Larin izbor. For her 2014 role as Olga Reshenko in Turkey Shoot, Dinka performed all her stunts and fight sequences. Dinka appeared as a sports reporter in the 2017 film Battle of the Sexes. Dinka co-wrote, starred and executively produced the short film Little Hands, directed by Claire McCarthy. Little Hands premiered at the Academy Award®-qualifying film festivals: Flickerfest (Australia) and Pula Film Festival (Croatia). Dinka won the International Award for Best Actress in a leading role for her portrayal of Mia in Little Hands.

== Public image ==
Dinka has been cited in Top 10 "Most Beautiful Croatian Actresses". Bosnian media portal Hercegovina addressed Dinka as an "Iconic Beauty" oozing a "magnetic screen presence" and described her sex appeal as "explosive" and "aristocratic".

== Humanitarian work ==
Dinka returned to the Balkans witnessing the aftermath of war during filming and development of Little Hands (2011). Upon her arrival to Bosnia & Herzegovina, she contacted the Ljubica Ivezić (Sarajevo) and Egipatsko Selo (Mostar) orphanages to learn more about the post-war effect on women and children. She spent three months on field in Mostar city, Bosnia & Herzegovina; Dinka later expressed she was overwhelmed by the sheer "energy, talent, unbreakable spirit and courage" of the youth in Mostar whilst residing in Bosnia & Herzegovina. To that end, her 2011 field visits were chronicled in the screenplay "Little Hands" in conjunction with the release of the humanitarian drama.

Three years later, in 2014, Dinka returned to the Croatian region on a field mission, meeting with displaced people due to severe flooding. In conjunction with the organisation Cinema Croatia, Dinka met with the victims of floods donating funds to families in response to an emergency appeal.

== Filmography ==
=== Actor ===
Film
Year	Title	Role	Notes
2016	Blind Date	Megan Romaine	
2016	Battle of the Sexes	Sports Reporter	
2015	StalkHer	Nurse Raya	
2014	Turkey Shoot	Olga Reshenko	
2013	Elysium	Gorgeous Blonde	
2013	The Bluff	Carla	
2012	Sharkproof	Ella	
2011	Little Hands	Mia	
2010	Warning	Ana	

Television
Year	Title	Role	Notes
2013	Secrets and Lies	Grace	
2012	True Blood	Fairy	
2011	Larin izbor	Officer Van Rooyen	

Music videos
Year	Title	Artist
2015	"Visions of Johanna"	Bob Dylan
2015	"Bang my Head"	David Guetta
2012	"Bigger the Better"	Nelly Furtado

== Theatre ==
Year	Title	Role	Venue
2006	Stage Direction by New York Studio	Ana	Sydney Theatre Company
2005	Who's Afraid of the Working class?	Gina	Powerhouse
2005	The Blues Brothers!	Principal vocalist and dancer	The Loft
2005	Light Shining in Buckinghamshire	Claxton's wife	Gardens Theatre
2004	Baal by Brecht	Emilie, Maja	Gardens Theatre
2004	The Bear by Chekhov	Yelena Popov	Gardens Theatre

=== Screenwriter ===
- 2011: Little Hands (Short film)
- 2009: Warning (Short film)

=== Producer ===
- 2016: Blind Date (Short Film)
- 2011: Little Hands (Short film)
- 2009: Warning (Short Film)

== Awards and nominations ==
Year	Award	Category	Nominated work	Result
2016	Sanctuary Cove International Film Festival	Best Actress in a Leading Role	Little Hands (2011 Film)	Won
