= The Waiting City =

- Film poster
- Directed by: Claire McCarthy
- Written by: Claire McCarthy
- Starring: Joel Edgerton; Radha Mitchell
- Music by: Michael Yezerski
- Production company: Spectrum Films
- Release dates: 16 September 2009 (Toronto); 15 July 2010 (Australia)
- Running time: 108 minutes
- Country: Australia
- Language: English
- Box office: $500,641

The Waiting City is a 2009 Australian film directed by Claire McCarthy. The film stars Joel Edgerton as Ben Simmons, Radha Mitchell as Fiona Simmons, Samrat Chakrabati as Krishna, and Isabel Lucas as Scarlett. The film's score was composed by Michael Yezerski. The Waiting City tells the story of an Australian couple who travel to India to adopt a child. During the trip, they learn more about their relationship and marriage.

The film was an official selection at the 2009 Toronto International Film Festival in the Special Presentation category. It was also screened at the Pusan International Film Festival in 2009 and the Sydney Film Festival in 2010.

== Synopsis ==
Fiona (Radha Mitchell) and Ben (Joel Edgerton) are a couple from Australia—she is a successful, self-starting lawyer while he is a relaxed, easy-going musician. The couple want to adopt a child and travel to India for what they imagine will be a quick and simple process. However, once they arrive in Calcutta (now Kolkata) they learn that little happens quickly in India, and for all the promises that have been made, they begin to doubt whether they will be able to complete the final stages of the adoption process.

While Fiona stays in touch with her clients at home via the internet and deals with the legal red tape slowing down the adoption, Ben finds himself wandering the streets of Calcutta and adjusting to the rhythms of the city. The stress of the waiting period seems to reinforce the differences between Fiona and Ben, and tension begins to grow into anger and resentment; adding to Ben's dissatisfaction is his budding friendship with Scarlett (Isabel Lucas), an attractive fellow visitor who seems more compatible with his attitudes than his wife.

Fiona, an atheist, finds herself at odds with the Indian people who are driven by religious tradition. As her stay in India progresses, the various unfamiliar sights evoke spiritual feelings in her. When Ben and Fiona finally go to the orphanage to meet their would-be daughter Lakshmi, they discover that she is chronically ill and likely unable to survive a flight to Sydney. Fiona and Ben are devastated when Lakshmi dies a few days later. Having lost all that they meant to find in India, the lovers decide once again that they need each other and engage in reconciliation.

== Cast ==
- Radha Mitchell as Fiona Simmons
- Joel Edgerton as Ben Simmons
- Samrat Chakrabarti as Krishna
- Isabel Lucas as Scarlett
- Tillotama Shome as Sister Tessila
- Barun Chanda as Doctor Khan
- Dana Roy as Sister Agnes
- Tamal Ray Chowdhury as Uncle
- Tanushree Shankar as Didi Chatterjee
- Palomi Ghosh as Urmi

== Production ==
=== Development ===
Claire McCarthy, the director of The Waiting City, used to volunteer with the Missionaries of Charity in India in 2002. She volunteered at the Mother Teresa Center and from her volunteering experiences, she was able to develop content for her 2008 documentary film Sisters. Following the documentary, McCarthy started to develop ideas for The Waiting City after meeting children in India who were waiting to be adopted.

Prior to filming, McCarthy and the film's director of photography, Denson Baker, went on research trips to India to observe the filming locations. Baker compiled over 6,000 photos during the pre-production phase. Baker has since worked on cinematography for television shows such as Victoria in 2017 and The Luminaries in 2020, and films such as Ophelia in 2018. Separate casting directors were used for the cast of The Waiting City, with one casting director in Australia and another casting director in India.

The Producer Offset, which provides funds to producers for the creation of Australian projects within films and television, contributed approximately 22 per cent of the film's budget. The Waiting City received support from Screen Australia, specifically production and marketing support. Screen Australia is a funding agency that assists with the production of low-budget Australian films. Additionally, the film received support from other agencies such as Screen NSW, Spectrum Films, and EFILM Australia.

=== Production ===
The film was produced by Jamie Hilton. The Waiting City was his theatrical debut as a producer. Following this film, he has worked on other films such as Sleeping Beauty in 2011, The Little Death in 2014, and Backtrack in 2015.

Beginning in late 2008, The Waiting City took 32 days to shoot. There were 120 members on the Indian production team, originating from Mumbai and Calcutta. In the Australian team, there were 10 production members and three cast members. Production design for the film was done by Pete Baxter, who has since worked on television shows such as Safe Harbour in 2018, On the Ropes in 2018, and Total Control in 2019.

=== Post-production ===
Following production, the film was edited by Veronika Jenet, who had previously received a nomination at the 66th Academy Awards for her work in the 1993 film The Piano. Since The Waiting City, she has worked on films such as Snowtown in 2011 and The Daughter in 2015.

== Themes ==
=== Motherhood ===
Motherhood is a key theme in The Waiting City. Fiona has conflict over two different domains of her life regarding family and career - her new role as a mother and her career as a lawyer. She priorities her career over motherhood. The film describes how this has negative consequences upon her marriage to Ben. Fiona's character representation as a "career-centered contemporary woman" contradicts the conventional depictions of motherhood. Fiona's trip to India with Ben makes her question whether or not she is suitable to be a mother. Krishna, the couple's driver in India, challenges Fiona's suitability as a mother due to her and Ben not already having children. He believes that them having to adopt a child means Fiona is not ready for motherhood. Fiona's surroundings during the trip, through religion and culture, reinforce India's firm beliefs of what it means to be a mother, that is, women should have a strong desire for motherhood. Traditionally, the concept of motherhood has been related to a woman's core identity and represents her femininity as a woman. These traditional beliefs make Fiona engage with her role as a woman and how she should want to attain motherhood.

=== Gender roles ===
The topic of gender roles is a key theme in The Waiting City. Fiona and Ben are represented as opposite character types which challenge traditional gender roles. Fiona is shown as a "career-centred contemporary woman" and Ben is described as her "male antithesis." The film creates a "battle of sexes" and strong power imbalance in their relationship. The Waiting City looks at how initially, Fiona and Ben challenge the traditional gender roles. Fiona is dominating and Ben has a lack of masculinity, preventing him from becoming the patriarchal role in the family unit. Traditionally in a family unit, both genders become the conventional stereotypes that are expected of their genders. Women have the responsibility of taking care of the children and men have the responsibility of financially supporting the family. The film shows how both characters need to align themselves with traditional gender dynamics to be able to have a family. International adoption prompts fathers to be more aware of their patriarchal role in the family. Ben needs to adopt the traditional notions of fatherhood. This makes Ben consider his role as a parental figure within the family unit. By the end of the film, Fiona and Ben have changed themselves, in terms of their gender roles, to be more in-line with traditional gender conventions and stereotypes.

=== Adoption ===
Adoption is a key theme in the film, speciafically international adoption, as the couple adopt their daughter, Lakshmi, from India. McCarthy, the film's director, wanted to discuss the additional complexities. Throughout the film, Fiona and Ben are faced with questions from people in India, such as their driver Krishna, about whether or not Lakshmi will be their adopted child or will she always belong to Mother India, the country that she is from. In international adoption, adopted children join families who have "different racial, cultural, and religious characteristics." Concerns are raised over whether or not they will lose the connection they have with their identity, heritage, and home country.

== Release ==
The Waiting City premiered at the 2009 Toronto International Film Festival in the Special Presentation category on 16 September 2009. The film screened at multiple other film festivals. It was screened at the Busan International Film Festival in the same year. In 2010, the film screened at the Sydney Film Festival, and at the Antipodean Film Festival in Saint Tropez, France, in October.

== Reception ==
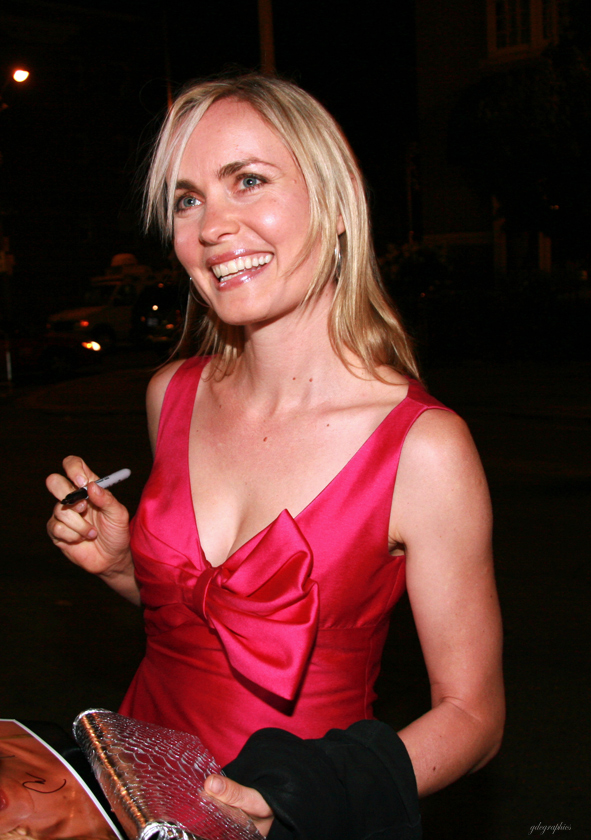
Radha Mitchell at the Toronto International Film Festival in 2009

=== Box office ===
The film went into wide release in Australian cinemas on 15 July 2010. In its opening weekend, The Waiting City grossed $119,021 in Australia. In total, the film grossed $500,641.

=== Critical response ===
The Waiting City earned mixed reviews; critics praised the cinematography, script and relationships explored in the film, but criticised the representation of the characters. On Rotten Tomatoes, the film has an approval rating of 75%, with an average score of 6.40/10, based on 16 reviews.

Giles Hardie, an Australian film critic with the Sydney Morning Herald, gave the film 4 stars out of 5. He wrote that the film is "a beautifully crafted bitter-sweet exploration of a functional but near-broken relationship exposed by this perpetually functional but near-broken city." Simon Miraudo, a critic from Quickflix, gave the film 4 stars out of 5, writing that "much of the joy ... comes from the slow unraveling of the characters relationships..." Kirk Honeycutt, from The Hollywood Reporter, praised the film for its "intimate account of a couple's encounter with the subcontinent" and McCarthy's understanding of "the power Indian spiritualism can have on foreigners."

Fiona Williams, a film writer with SBS Movies at SBS, gave The Waiting City 2.5 stars out of 5. She criticised the film's "uneven execution of pivotal moments" and how the events depicted were not genuine and did not have "poignancy." She criticised the film's representation of Fiona and Ben as "extremes" whose characters were opposite of each other, questioning how realistic their relationship was. She praised McCarthy's willingness to create the film, saying it goes into many topics, such as relationships and adoption, that other contemporary films have not explored in detail.

Mark Naglazas, a critic with The West Australian, praised Mitchell and Edgerton's performances but criticised the "more melodramatic contrivances involving an Indian hotel employee who becomes the rather unlikely voice of Indian spiritualism..."

=== Awards and accolades ===
The Waiting City was nominated for 4 awards at the Inside Film Awards in 2010, including Best Cinematography, Best Editing, Best Actor, and Best Actress. The film won the Best Cinematography award for Denson Baker, beating films Bright Star and Mao's Last Dancer, and won the Best Editing award for Veronika Jenet, beating films Animal Kingdom and Bright Star.

At the 2011 Film Critics Circle of Australia Awards the film was nominated for 8 awards including Best Cinematography, Best Actor - Male, Best Actor - Female, Best Film, Best Director, Best Screenplay, Best Music Score, and Best Editor. The film won the award for Best Cinematography for Denson Baker.

Awards
Year	Ceremony	Category	Recipients	Result
2010	Australian Directors Guild	Best Direction in a Feature Film	Claire McCarthy	Nominated
2010	Australian Film Institute	Best Cinematography	Denson Baker	Nominated
2010	Inside Film (IF) Awards	Best Cinematography	Denson Baker	Won
2010	Inside Film (IF) Awards	Best Editing	Veronika Jenet	Won
2010	Inside Film (IF) Awards	Best Actor	Joel Edgerton	Nominated
2010	Inside Film (IF) Awards	Best Actress	Radha Mitchell	Nominated
2010	Recontres Internationales du Cinema des Antipodes	Best Feature Film	Claire McCarthy	Won
2011	Film Critics Circle of Australia Awards	Best Cinematography	Denson Baker	Won
2011	Film Critics Circle of Australia Awards	Best Actor - Male	Joel Edgerton	Nominated
2011	Film Critics Circle of Australia Awards	Best Actor - Female	Radha Mitchell	Nominated
2011	Film Critics Circle of Australia Awards	Best Film	Jamie Hilton and Claire McCarthy	Nominated
2011	Film Critics Circle of Australia Awards	Best Director	Claire McCarthy	Nominated
2011	Film Critics Circle of Australia Awards	Best Screenplay	Claire McCarthy	Nominated
2011	Film Critics Circle of Australia Awards	Best Music Score	Michael Yezerski	Nominated
2011	Film Critics Circle of Australia Awards	Best Editor	Veronika Jenet	Nominated

== Soundtrack ==
The score was composed and conducted by Michael Yezerski, an Australian composer known for his scores in films including The Black Balloon and Newcastle. He has previously won awards at the 2008 Screen Music Awards for his work in The Black Balloon. Julia Stone, an Australian folk singer-songwriter from the folk and indie pop group Angus & Julia, also composed two songs "This Love" and "I'll Be Waiting" for the film.

Track listing
No.	Title	Writer(s)	Length
1.	"Amra Sobai Raja"	Rabindranath Tagore	00:40
2.	"Mukti [Chaari Chaari]"	Madan Dutta / Sarangan / Michael Yezerski	03:04
3.	"Puja"	Michael Yezerski	00:49
4.	"This Love"	Julia Stone	03:30
5.	"Cricket"	Michael Yezerski	00:46
6.	"I'll Be Waiting"	Julia Stone	02:51
7.	"Ek Din Bhaube Elen Mohammed"	Traditional	02:27
8.	"Prem Diroho"	Basudev Das Baul / Traditional	06:22
9.	"Ekla Chole Re"	Rabindranath Tagore	02:51
10.	"Krishna's Village"	Michael Yezerski	01:05
11.	"Only Love Is Real [Live]"	Edo Kahn / Nadav Kahn	01:53
12.	"Love"	Michael Yezerski	01:26
13.	"Only Love Is Real"	Edo Kahn / Nadav Kahn	01:53
14.	"Augune Porosh Muni"	Rabindranath Tagore	01:29
15.	"After the Fight"	Michael Yezerski	02:56
16.	"Waiting for You"	Ben Lee / Amrita Sen / Ichiro Suezawa	03:57
Total length:			37:59

== See also ==
- Cinema of Australia
- Films shot in India
