= Beneath Hill 60 =

2010 Australian film by Jeremy Hartley Sims

- Australian theatrical poster
- Directed by: Jeremy Hartley Sims
- Written by: David Roach
- Produced by: Bill Leimbach
- Starring: Brendan Cowell; Gyton Grantley; Aden Young; Bella Heathcote; Jacqueline McKenzie; Anthony Hayes; Steve Le Marquand
- Cinematography: Toby Oliver
- Edited by: Dany Cooper
- Music by: Cezary Skubiszewski
- Distributed by: Paramount Pictures
- Release date: 15 April 2010
- Running time: 122 minutes
- Country: Australia
- Language: English
- Budget: A$8.1 million
- Box office: $3.4 million

Beneath Hill 60 is a 2010 Australian war film directed by Jeremy Sims (credited as Jeremy Hartley Sims) and written by David Roach. Based on the 2011 upcoming book Beneath Hill 60: The Extraordinary True Story of the Secret War Being Waged Beneath the Trenches of the Western Front by Will Davies.

Set during World War I, the film tells the story of the 1st Australian Tunnelling Company's efforts in mining underneath Hill 60 in the Ypres Salient on the Western Front. During the war, a series of mines filled with explosive charges were placed beneath German lines to aid the advance of British troops. The screenplay is based on an account of the ordeal written by Captain Oliver Woodward, who is portrayed by Brendan Cowell in the film.

Beneath Hill 60 was released in Australia on 15 April 2010. In July 2009, it was reported that there were plans to have the film showcased at the 2010 Cannes Film Festival but, ultimately, it was not included in the official competition or any other section in the festival.

== Plot ==
As seen in flashbacks that occur throughout the film, Oliver Woodward is an Australian miner supplying copper for the war effort. He falls in love with Marjorie Waddell, a young woman ten years his junior. However, he is under constant pressure to enlist, especially from Waddell's father. He has the opportunity to do so when the British Army forms the 1st Australian Tunnelling Company to supplement the Royal Engineers; Woodward is commissioned to lead the unit.

In May 1916, near Armentières, France, 30 feet below the Western Front, Woodward meets Frank Tiffin, a young Australian soldier who is suffering from shell shock. Woodward reassigns Tom Dwyer and Norman Morris to relieve Tiffin. Two German tunnelers break through into the tunnel. Morris and Dwyer dispatch both of them, but Dwyer is killed when a German explosive goes off, bringing down the tunnel on top of them; Morris is rescued by the other sappers.

Woodward is later tasked with destroying the Red House, a fortified German position raining enfilade fire down upon the frontmost section of the British trenches. Although Woodward initially proposed tunneling beneath the Red House, his commanding officer, Colonel Wilson Rutledge, insisted that it be done by dawn. Along with Corporal Bill Fraser and Morris, Woodward crosses No Man's Land. They manage to reach the Red House and plant explosives underneath it. However, as they make their way back to the British lines, they discover that the reel of cable is too short, so Morris runs ahead to retrieve the exploder. While they wait, they discover mortally wounded Lieutenant Robert Clayton, who had been ordered to cut a gap in the wire obstacle for them. Morris arrives with the exploder and they destroy the Red House. After they destroy the house, Clayton dies of his wounds.

The next day, after a friendly game of rugby against some British soldiers, Woodward is promoted to captain and he subsequently promotes Fraser to Sergeant; he later receives word that they are to be moved up the lines to the Ypres Salient. Upon their arrival, Tiffin, Walter Sneddon and Billy Bacon are separated from the rest of the battalion and pinned down by German machine gun fire. Bacon, being the fastest runner, volunteers to distract the Germans while the others make a run for the British lines. Although Tiffin and Walter succeed, Bacon is killed mere inches from safety.

The unit continues on to Hill 60, located in the Zwarte Leen area of Zillebeke, south of Ypres. During an inspection, it is revealed that the Canadian & British Engineers have been tunneling deep below the Messines Ridge (helling van Mesen - heuvelrug Wijtschate-Mesen) for months, planting a million pounds of ammonium nitrate in 21 massive mine chambers. Woodward is tasked with maintaining two of the mines dug by the Canadians, Hill 60 and The Caterpillar, as the British military buildup begins; they hope to kill as many German troops as possible. To this end, he constructs an enormous shaft to keep the water table from inundating the explosives. He also digs multiple diversion tunnels to confuse the Germans. Jim Sneddon (Walter's Dad), is buried in one such tunnel when he is ordered into it by Colonel Rutledge, despite reporting that the Germans would likely be setting off the explosives soon.

The Germans eventually discover their plan and dig toward the main tunnel. An attack tunnel is dug in response, and the Australians successfully destroy the exploratory shaft with minutes to spare. However, the charge that was used weakens the clay and a portion of the tunnel collapses, trapping Tiffin. His compatriots race to stall the detonation of the mines, but the schedule cannot be delayed on account of one man. Woodward detonates two of the mines fired at the start of the Battle of Messines.

Woodward returns to Australia and the surviving members of the unit gather for his wedding with Marjorie.

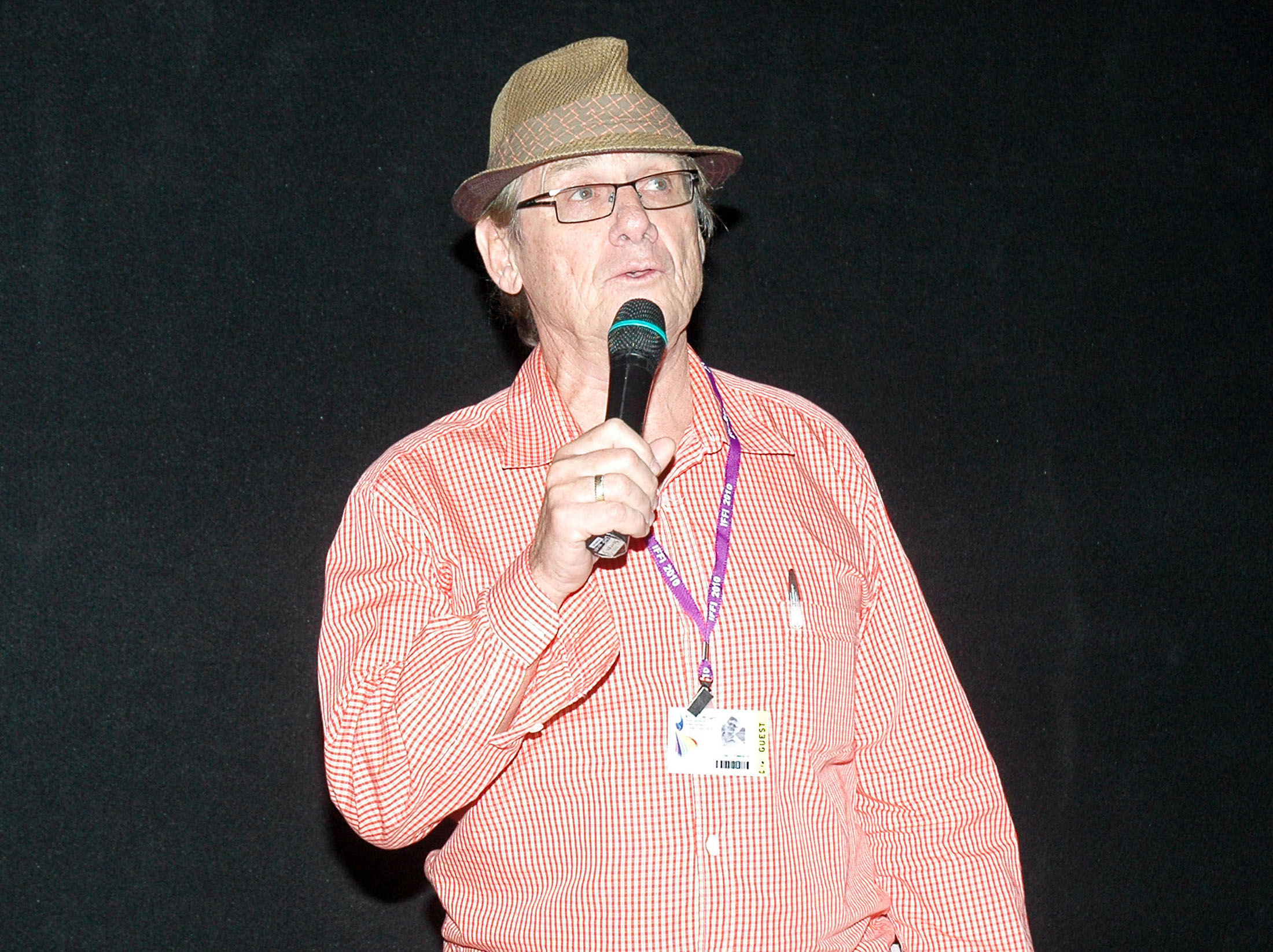
Producer Bill Leimbach presenting the film at IFFI (2010)

== Cast ==
- Brendan Cowell as Oliver Woodward
- Alan Dukes as Jim Sneddon
- Alex Thompson as Walter Sneddon
- Harrison Gilbertson as Frank Tiffin
- Steve Le Marquand as Bill Fraser
- Gyton Grantley as Norman Morris
- Warwick Young as Percy Marsden
- Mark Coles Smith as Billy Bacon
- Martin Thomas as Ginger O'Donnell
- Oliver Leimbach as Screaming Soldier (Youngston)
- Anthony Hayes as William McBride
- Leon Ford as Lt. Robert Clayton
- Fletcher Illidge as Colin Waddell
- Morgan Illidge as Gordon Waddell
- Jacqueline McKenzie as Mrs. Emma Waddell
- Juliana Dodd as Isabel Waddell
- Gerald Lepkowski as William Waddell
- Bella Heathcote as Marjorie Waddell (credited as Isabella Heathcote)
- Chris Haywood as Colonel Wilson Rutledge
- Bob Franklin as Potsy
- Anthony Ring as Stoat
- Nikki Fort as Mrs. Thorn
- Alice Cavanagh as Agnes
- Simon Coomes as Rex Astros
- Mahala Wallace as Eunice
- Jessica Robertson as Dotty (credited as Jessica Paige)
- Marcus Costello as Ernst Wagner
- Kenneth Spiteri as Karl Babek
- Aden Young as Major Brady North (3rd Canadian Tunnelling Company - Nova Scotia)
- David Ritchie as Otto Fusslein
- Tom Green as Warren Hutchings
- John Stanton as General Lambert
- Andy Bramble as Wilf Piggott

== Production ==
Ross J. Thomas, a mining engineer and historian, met producer Bill Leimbach and quickly convinced him that the story of Captain Oliver Woodward and the 1st Australian Tunnelling Company was "a story crying out to be told". Thomas knew descendants of Captain Oliver Woodward living in Melbourne, who agreed to have Woodward's diaries adapted into a screenplay. Leimbach recruited David Roach to write the film. Extensive research went into developing the characters and their environment, with Canberra's Australian War Memorial Archives providing research material.

The majority of the war scenes were written to take place inside the tunnels so a tense environment could be achieved while facilitating the film's tight budget. While searching for a director, Leimbach viewed Jeremy Sims's 2006 film Last Train to Freo. Impressed with the intensity of the film's claustrophobic action, Leimbach approached Sims, who agreed to direct Beneath Hill 60 after reading an early treatment.

Actor Hugo Weaving showed interest in participating in the film and was offered the role of Oliver Woodward, but ultimately declined due to his claustrophobia. The role went to Brendan Cowell in a decision driven by the actor's experience and numerous accolades.

Working titles for the film included The Silence and The Silence Beneath. Leimbach explained that the film was titled Beneath Hill 60 to maximise recognition for the international audience and felt that it was a more suitable title for a war film.

Principal photography for Beneath Hill 60 began in late July 2009 and lasted around 40 days. The film was shot in Townsville, Queensland and its surrounding areas. Locations were used to represent both Australia and the Western Front in Belgium, while the tunnels were constructed as sets indoors; digging actual tunnels to film in would have proved "logistically impossible" and posed a high level of risk to the cast and crew. Actor Hugh Jackman gave the production team part of a set from a World War I scene in X-Men Origins: Wolverine, which Jackman had starred in and produced. The local Brothers Rugby Union club provided the players for the rugby game and the following thigh slapping singing scene.

== Release ==
Despite initial plans to have the film released on Anzac Day (25 April), the film was released on 15 April 2010.

It was released on DVD and Blu-ray on 19 August 2010 in Australia, and on 28 June 2011 in the United States.

== Reception ==
Beneath Hill 60 received generally positive reviews. Review aggregate Rotten Tomatoes reports that 86% of critics have been positive with the film based on 14 reviews, with an average score of 7.14/10.

=== Accolades ===
Award	Category	Subject	Result
AACTA Awards (2010 Australian Film Institute Awards)	Best Film	Bill Leimbach	Nominated
AACTA Awards (2010 Australian Film Institute Awards)	Best Direction	Jeremy Sims	Nominated
AACTA Awards (2010 Australian Film Institute Awards)	Best Original Screenplay	David Roach	Nominated
AACTA Awards (2010 Australian Film Institute Awards)	Best Actor	Brendan Cowell	Nominated
AACTA Awards (2010 Australian Film Institute Awards)	Best Cinematography	Toby Oliver	Nominated
AACTA Awards (2010 Australian Film Institute Awards)	Best Editing	Dany Cooper	Nominated
AACTA Awards (2010 Australian Film Institute Awards)	Best Original Music Score	Cezary Skubiszewski	Nominated
AACTA Awards (2010 Australian Film Institute Awards)	Best Sound	Mark Cornish	Nominated
AACTA Awards (2010 Australian Film Institute Awards)	Best Sound	Liam Egan	Nominated
AACTA Awards (2010 Australian Film Institute Awards)	Best Sound	Tony Murtagh	Nominated
AACTA Awards (2010 Australian Film Institute Awards)	Best Sound	Alicia Slusarski	Nominated
AACTA Awards (2010 Australian Film Institute Awards)	Best Sound	Robert Sullivan	Nominated
AACTA Awards (2010 Australian Film Institute Awards)	Best Sound	Mario Vaccaro	Nominated
AACTA Awards (2010 Australian Film Institute Awards)	Best Production Design	Clayton Jauncey	Nominated
AACTA Awards (2010 Australian Film Institute Awards)	Best Costume Design	Wendy Cork	Nominated
AACTA Awards (2010 Australian Film Institute Awards)	Best Costume Design	Ian Sparke	Nominated
ADG Award	Best Direction in a Feature Film	Bill Leimbach	Nominated
ASE Award	Best Editing in a Feature Film	Dany Cooper	Won
FCCA Awards	Best Film	Bill Leimbach	Nominated
FCCA Awards	Best Director	Jeremy Sims	Nominated
FCCA Awards	Best Screenplay	David Roach	Won
FCCA Awards	Best Actor - Male	Brendan Cowell	Nominated
FCCA Awards	Best Supporting Actor - Male	Steve Le Marquand	Nominated
FCCA Awards	Best Cinematography	Toby Oliver	Nominated
FCCA Awards	Best Editing	Dany Cooper	Won
FCCA Awards	Best Music Score	Cezary Skubiszewski	Nominated
Inside Film Awards	Best Feature Film	Bill Leimbach	Nominated
Inside Film Awards	Best Direction	Jeremy Sims	Nominated
Inside Film Awards	Best Sound	Mark Cornish	Nominated
Inside Film Awards	Best Sound	Liam Egan	Nominated
Inside Film Awards	Best Sound	Tony Murtagh	Nominated
Inside Film Awards	Best Sound	Robert Sullivan	Nominated
Inside Film Awards	Best Production Design	Clayton Jauncey	Nominated

== See also ==
- Mines in the Battle of Messines (1917)
- Hill 60 (Ypres)
- Battle of Hill 60 (Western Front)
- Gallipoli, a 1981 Australian film set during World War I
- The Lighthorsemen, a 1987 Australian film set during World War I
- Forty Thousand Horsemen, a 1940 Australian film set during World War I, directed by Charles Chauvel
- Cinema of Australia
