= Australian Film Institute International Award for Excellence in Filmmaking =

Australian film award

International Award for Excellence in Filmmaking AACTA Award
- Country: Australia
- Presented by: Australian Film Institute (AFI)
- First award: 2005
- Final award: 2009
- Website: http://www.aacta.org

The Australian Film Institute International Award for Excellence in Filmmaking was a special award presented by the Australian Film Institute (AFI) "in recognition of any area of achievement (excluding performance) by an Australian in films produced internationally, recognising the contribution of Australian film and television industry practitioners worldwide." It was handed out at the Australian Film Institute Awards (known commonly as the AFI Awards), which are now the AACTA Awards after the establishment of the Australian Academy of Cinema and Television Arts (AACTA), by the AFI. The award was presented in 2001 as a special achievement award before it was made into a competitive award in 2006, but from 2007-2009 it was only handed out as a career based award "acknowledging the continued contribution of an Australian practitioner to international productions", and not for a particular film.

== Winners ==
In the following table, in 2006 winners are listed first, in boldface and highlighted in gold; those listed below the winner that are not in boldface or highlighted are the nominees; in 2005, and from 2007-2009, the award was presented as a special award and those winners will be marked in a different colour. The third column lists the country that the film was made for, from 2005-2007.

Year	Recipient(s)	Film	Country	Craft
**2005** (47th)	**Roger Savage**	**House of Flying Daggers**	China; Hong Kong	Sound
**2006** (48th)	**Dion Beebe**	**Memoirs of a Geisha**	Japan; United States	Cinematography
2006 (48th)	Donald McAlpine	The Chronicles of Narnia: The Lion, the Witch and the Wardrobe	United Kingdom	Cinematography
2006 (48th)	Roger Ford	The Chronicles of Narnia: The Lion, the Witch and the Wardrobe	United Kingdom	Production design
2006 (48th)	Roger Donaldson	The World's Fastest Indian	New Zealand	Production, direction and screenplay
**2007** (49th)	**Jill Bilcock**	–	–	Editing
**2008** (50th)	**Peter James**	–	–	Cinematography
**2009** (51st)	**Nathan McGuinness**	–	–	Senior visual effects supervisor

== See also ==
- AACTA Awards
