= Veronika Jenet =

Australian film editor

- Born: Veronika Jenet; Australia
- Occupation: Film editor
- Years active: 1983–present

Veronika Jenet is an Australian film editor, best known for The Piano, Rabbit-Proof Fence and Lore. Jenet is a member of the Australian Screen Editors Guild.

She was nominated at the 66th Academy Awards in the category of Best Film Editing for the film The Piano.

== Filmography ==
Year	Film	Director	Notes
1983	Passionless Moments	Gerard Lee	Short film
1983	Passionless Moments	Jane Campion	Short film
1989	Sweetie	Jane Campion	
1990	An Angel at My Table	Jane Campion	
1993	The Piano	Jane Campion	AACTA Award for Best Editing; Nominated—Academy Award for Best Film Editing; Nominated—ACE Eddie for Best Edited Feature Film – Dramatic; Nominated—BAFTA Award for Best Editing
1995	Vacant Possession	Margot Nash	Nominated—AACTA Award for Best Editing
1996	The Portrait of a Lady	Jane Campion	
1999	Holy Smoke!	Jane Campion	
1999	Paperback Hero	Antony Bowman	
2002	Rabbit-Proof Fence	Phillip Noyce	Inside Film Award for Best Editing; Nominated—AACTA Award for Best Editing
2004	Love's Brother	Jan Sardi	
2006	Photograph	Sarah Lambert	
2007	Bastard Boys	Raymond Quint	Mini-series
2008	The Black Balloon	Elissa Down	AACTA Award for Best Editing; Nominated—ASE Award for Best Feature Film Editing; Nominated—FCCA Award for Best Editor; Nominated—Inside Film Award for Best Editing
2009	Beautiful Kate	Rachel Ward	Nominated—ASE Award for Best Feature Film Editing; Nominated—Inside Film Award for Best Editing
2009	The Waiting City	Claire McCarthy	Inside Film Award for Best Editing; Nominated—FCCA Award for Best Editor
2011	Snowtown	Justin Kurzel	AACTA Award for Best Editing; Inside Film Award for Best Editing; Nominated—FCCA Award for Best Editor
2012	Lore	Cate Shortland	Nominated—FCCA Award for Best Editor
2013	Around the Block	Sarah Spillane	
2014	The Ravens	Jennifer Perrott	Short film
2015	Strangerland	Kim Farrant	
2015	The Daughter	Simon Stone	Nominated—AACTA Award for Best Editing
2017	Jasper Jones	Rachel Perkins	
2017	1%	Stephen McCallum	
2019	Danger Close: The Battle of Long Tan	Kriv Stenders	
2023	True Spirit	Sarah Spillane	
