= Jill Bilcock =

Australian film editor

Jill Bilcock AC
- Born: Jill Elizabeth Stevenson; 1948 (age 77–78); Horsham, Victoria, Australia
- Occupation: Film editor

Jill Elizabeth Bilcock AC (born 1948 as Jill Stevenson), is an Australian film editor. She was nominated for BAFTA Awards for Strictly Ballroom (1992), Romeo + Juliet (1996), and Moulin Rouge! (2002), and Elizabeth (1998). In 2007 she won the Australian Film Institute International Award for Excellence in Filmmaking.

== Early life and education ==
Jill Elizabeth Stevenson, later Bilcock, was born in 1948 in Horsham, Victoria, Australia. Her family, which included Jill and two brothers, moved to Melbourne when she was three, and her father left the family when she was four. Her mother worked full-time as a teacher at a technical school, and went to the University of Melbourne at night to complete a degree in commerce. Artists, poets, and authors visited their home regularly. She later said that she "didn't have a lot of parenting".

She is a graduate of the Swinburne Film and Television School (1968), entering its first film course at the age of 17, after leaving school and enrolling at Swinburne Technical College at the age of 15, encouraged by her mother. She went on a student trip to China, which at the time was in the throes of the Cultural Revolution, and generally closed to foreigners; she became an honorary Red Guard there. When Brian Robinson started the first film course at Swinburne, she jumped at it. There she met Fred Schepisi, who was one of the examiners.

== Career ==
Bilcock began her career doing commercials (there being no Australian film industry then), after being invited by Fred Schepisi to work at his company, The Film House. Schepisi "let [them] run wild", and allowed the students to experiment with all aspects of filmmaking. She started specialising in editing, assisted by Richard Lowenstein, who had also graduated from Swinburne.

In the mid-1970s, she was invited to a job in London, but, travelling via India, ended up staying in that country for a year, living a hippie-style existence in Goa and taking bit parts in local films.

Her first feature film was Richard Lowenstein's Strikebound (1984). During the 1980s and 1990s, she started working with filmmakers on well-known films such as Dogs in Space (directed by Lowenstein, 1987), Strictly Ballroom (Baz Luhrmann, 1992), Muriel's Wedding (P.J. Hogan, 1994), and Head On (Ana Kokkinos, 1998).

Bilcock later edited films such as Luhrmann's Romeo + Juliet (1996) and Moulin Rouge! (2001) and Sam Mendes' 2002 crime drama Road to Perdition.

Her editing style has been described as "boldly inventive", and her editing of the Luhrmann films known for their "strikingly fast cutting, whirl of noise and colour and unconventional jumps". She has said: "I want wild, I want innovative, unusual and visually extraordinary". However, she changed pace on films such as Road to Perdition and The Dish.

== Other activities ==
On 3 July 2020, during the COVID-19 pandemic in Australia Bilcock gave an online masterclass as part of "WIFT Virtual" series, an initiative of WIFT Australia.

In November 2024 she was on the jury of the International Film Festival of India, alongside Singaporean director Anthony Chen, British producer Elizabeth Karlsen, Spanish producer Fran Borgia, and Indian producer and actor Ashutosh Gowariker, who acted as chair.

== Recognition, awards, and honours ==
Bilcock is a member of the Australian Screen Editors guild, as well as the American Cinema Editors society, which permits her to use the post-nominals ASE and ACE.

The documentaries Jill Billcock: The Art Of Film Editing for ABC TV and the cinema-released Jill Bilcock: Dancing the Invisible (78 mins), both in 2017, explore her life and work. Dancing the Invisible includes commentary from Cate Blanchett, Baz Luhrmann, Shekhar Kapur, Phil Noyce, Fred Schepisi, Richard Lowenstein, Jocelyn Moorhouse, Kriv Stenders, Ana Kokkinos, Sue Brooks, and Rachel Griffiths. The film was directed, written, co-produced, and edited by Axel Grigor, and executive produced by Sue Maslin. The film won the Audience Award at the Adelaide Film Festival.

Bilcock is highly respected in the industry, and has received several lifetime achievement awards, including the AFI Byron Kennedy Award, AFI International Award for Excellence in Filmmaking, and IF Awards Lifetime Achievement Award. In July 2018 Flicks film critic Glenn Dunks called Bilcock "one of Australia's greatest film practitioners. Probably the most successful film editor this country has ever produced". At that time, she had won five AFI Awards and been nominated for four more; been nominated for two AACTA Awards and four BAFTAs; and had received multiple career achievement awards.

She has been awarded two official Australian honours:

- 2001: Centenary Medal, "For service to Australian society and film production"
- 2018: Companion of the Order of Australia (the highest award), "For eminent service to the Australian motion picture industry as a film editor, to the promotion and development of the profession, as a role model, and through creative contributions to the nation's cultural identity", in the Queen's Birthday 2018 Honours List

Film awards and nominations include:

- 1992: Winner, Best Achievement in Editing in the 1992 Australian Film Institute Awards, for Strictly Ballroom
- 1992: Nominated, BAFTA Award for Best Editing in the 45th British Academy Film Awards, for Strictly Ballroom
- 1995: Byron Kennedy Award
- 1996: Winner, Best Editing, MovieMaker Readers Awards
- 1996: Nominated, BAFTA Award for Best Editing in the 50th British Academy Film Awards, for Romeo + Juliet
- 1998: Nominated, BAFTA Award for Best Editing in the 52nd British Academy Film Awards, for Elizabeth, directed by Shekhar Kapur
- 2001: AFI (American Film Institute Awards) Editor of the Year
- 2002: Winner Eddie Award from the American Cinema Editors (best edited comedy or musical feature film) for Moulin Rouge!
- 2001: Nominated, Academy Award for Best Film Editing (Oscar), for Moulin Rouge!
- 2002: Nominated, BAFTA Award for Best Editing in the 55th British Academy Film Awards, for Moulin Rouge!
- 2007: Winner, Australian Film Institute International Award for Excellence in Filmmaking, at the 2007 Australian Film Institute Awards
- 2012: Moulin Rouge! listed as the 32nd best-edited film of all time in a 2012 survey of members of the Motion Picture Editors Guild
- 2013: Jill Robb Award for Outstanding Leadership, Achievement and Service to the Victorian Screen Industry, one of two Victorian Screen Leader Awards established by Film Victoria the preceding year
- 2015: Nominated, AACTA Award for Best Editing, for The Dressmaker

== Filmography ==
Year	Film	Director	Notes
1984	Strikebound	Richard Lowenstein	Nominated—AACTA Award for Best Editing
1986	The More Things Change...	Robyn Nevin	
1986	Dogs in Space	Richard Lowenstein	
1987	Australian Made: The Movie	Richard Lowenstein	
1988	Evil Angels	Fred Schepisi	Nominated—AACTA Award for Best Editing
1990	Till There Was You	John Seale	
1992	Strictly Ballroom	Baz Luhrmann	AACTA Award for Best Editing; Nominated—BAFTA Award for Best Editing
1993	Say a Little Prayer	Richard Lowenstein	
1993	Temptation of a Monk	Clara Law	
1994	Erotique	Clara Law	Segment: "Wonton Soup"
1994	Erotique	Lizzie Borden	Segment: "Let's Talk About Love"
1994	Erotique	Ana Maria Magalhães	Segment: "Final Call"
1994	Erotique	Monika Treut	Segment: "Taboo Parlor"
1994	Muriel's Wedding	P. J. Hogan	Nominated—AACTA Award for Best Editing
1994	I.Q.	Fred Schepisi	
1995	How to Make an American Quilt	Jocelyn Moorhouse	
1996	Romeo + Juliet	Baz Luhrmann	Nominated—AACTA Award for Best Editing; Nominated—BAFTA Award for Best Editing; Nominated—Satellite Award for Best Editing
1998	Head On	Ana Kokkinos	AACTA Award for Best Editing
1998	Elizabeth	Shekhar Kapur	Nominated—BAFTA Award for Best Editing
1999	Harry's War	Richard Frankland	
2000	The Dish	Rob Sitch	
2001	Moulin Rouge!	Baz Luhrmann	AACTA Award for Best Editing; ACE Eddie for Best Edited Feature Film – Comedy or Musical; Nominated—Academy Award for Best Film Editing; Nominated—BAFTA Award for Best Editing; Nominated—Satellite Award for Best Editing
2002	Road to Perdition	Sam Mendes	
2003	Japanese Story	Sue Brooks	AACTA Award for Best Editing; Nominated—FCCA Award for Best Editor; Nominated—Inside Film Award for Best Editing
2004	The Libertine	Laurence Dunmore	Nominated—ASE Award for Best Editing in a Feature Film
2006	Catch a Fire	Phillip Noyce	
2007	Elizabeth: The Golden Age	Shekhar Kapur	
2009	The Young Victoria	Jean-Marc Vallée	
2009	Blessed	Ana Kokkinos	Nominated—AACTA Award for Best Editing
2010	Don't Be Afraid of the Dark	Troy Nixey	
2011	Red Dog	Kriv Stenders	Nominated—AACTA Award for Best Editing; Nominated—Inside Film Award for Best Editing
2012	Mental	P. J. Hogan	Nominated—ASE Award for Best Editing in a Feature Film
2014	Arrows of the Thunder Dragon	Greg Sneddon	
2014	Kill Me Three Times	Kriv Stenders	
2014	My Mistress	Stephen Lance	
2014	Driving Miss Daisy	David Esbjornson	Theatrical release of Australian stage production
2015	The Dressmaker	Jocelyn Moorhouse	Nominated—AACTA Award for Best Editing; Nominated—FCCA Award for Best Editor
2016	Red Dog: True Blue	Kriv Stenders	
2019	Ride Like a Girl	Rachel Griffiths	
2020	High Ground	Stephen Maxwell Johnson	Nominated—AACTA Award for Best Editing

== See also ==
- List of film director and editor collaborations
