= Michael Yezerski =

Australian composer

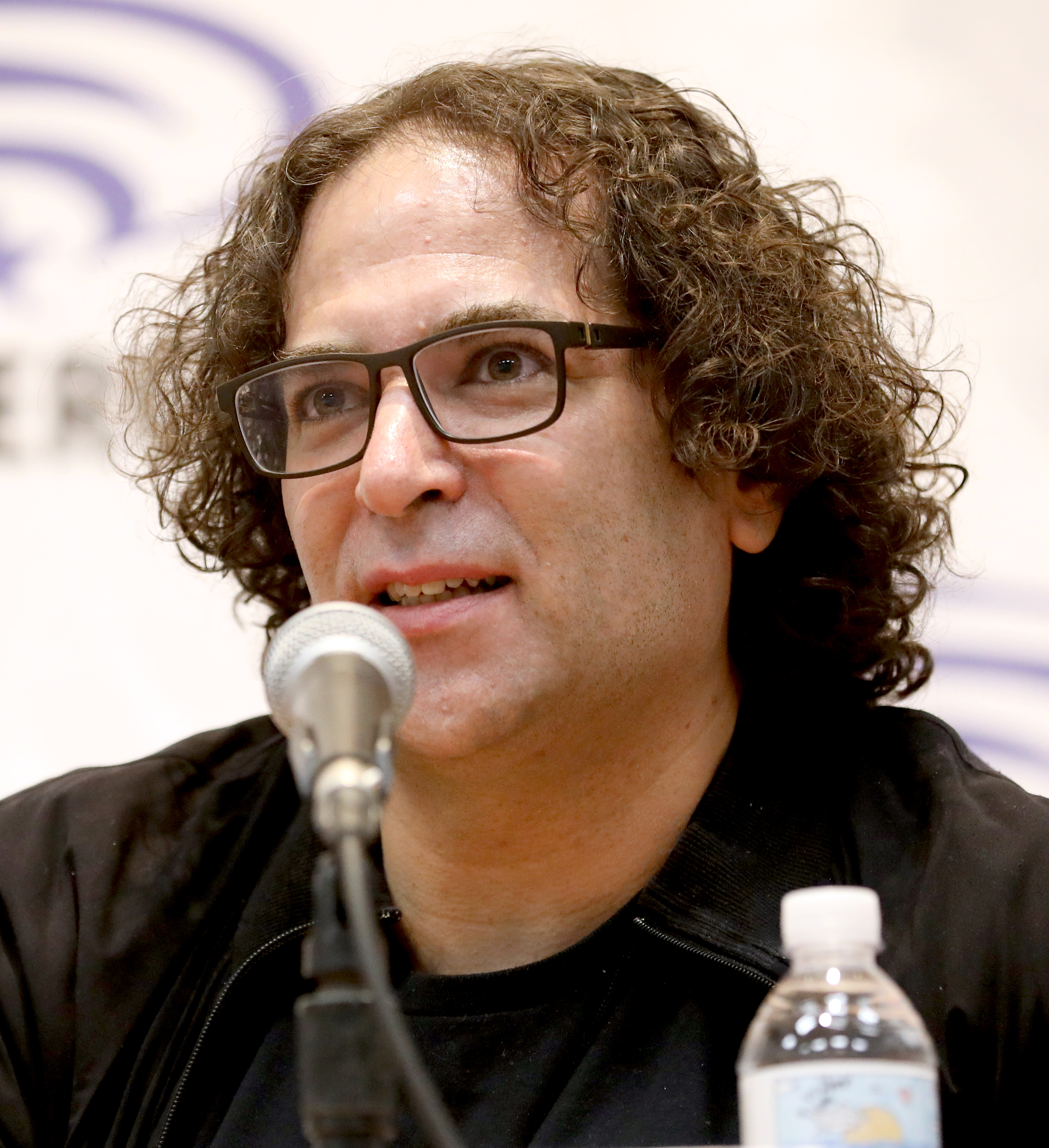
Yezerski at the 2024 WonderCon

Michael Yezerski (born and raised in Sydney) is an Australian composer known for his scores for feature films such as The Waiting City, The Black Balloon (for which he won an APRA Award and a Screen Music Award), Newcastle, and Thursday's Fictions, as well as collaborations with the Australian Chamber Orchestra and the Gondwana Voices Children's Choir (such as an adaptation of Shaun Tan's book The Red Tree), the National Museum of Canberra, Synergy Percussion and The Physical TV Company.

In an interview with Headliner Magazine, Yezerski discussed composing the score for 2019 horror film, The Vigil: "Why have there been so many horror films that have explored the various denominations of Christianity and demons and devils and everything associated with Christianity, but there has hardly ever been a film that explores the dark side of Jewish mysticism? I'm Jewish myself, so this is exactly the question that I've been asking. What I love about horror films, and dark, edgy films, in general – there's so much creative license to play with musical effects in non traditional ways. It's really fun as a composer."

== Filmography as composer ==
=== Film ===
Title	Year	Note(s)
Ah Hu's Retreat	2001	Documentary short film
A Matter of Life	2001	Short film
The Other Son	2001	Short film
No Surrender	2002	Short film
Broken Beat	2005	Short film
Burma's Open Road: An Insight Into Myanymar	2007	Documentary
Skin	2007	Short film
La même nuit	2007	Short film
Cross Life	2007	
Thursday's Fictions	2007	
Reincarnating Thursday's Fictions	2008	Documentary
Night Train	2008	Short film
Sisters	2008	Documentary short film
The Last Mahout	2008	Documentary
The Black Balloon	2008	
Newcastle	2008	
Storm Surfers, Dangerous Banks	2008	Documentary
Echo	2009	Short film
The Waiting City	2009	
Seamstress	2010	Short film
Stay Awake	2010	Short film
Providence Park	2010	Short film
The Lost Thing	2010	Short film
Pop	2010	Short film
Little Hands	2011	Short film
The Gold Pen	2011	Short film
The Outback	2012	
Boo!	2012	Short film; theme music composer
Storm Surfers 3D	2012	Documentary
Mental	2012	
Inhuman Resources	2012	
A Man Walks Into a Bar	2013	Short film
Drift	2013	
The Last Impresario	2013	Documentary
Baby Baby	2014	Short film
Flyboy	2014	Short film
Transformers: Age of Extinction	2014	additional music
The Little Death	2014	
Only the Dead	2015	Documentary
Talk to Someone	2015	Short film
The Devil's Candy	2015	
Shiny	2016	Short film
The Ravens	2016	Short film
We Don't Belong Here	2017	
The Beehive	2017	Short film
Blindspotting	2018	
The Vigil	2019	
Dangerous Animals	2025	
Ice Road: Vengeance	2025	
Buddy	2026	

=== Television ===
Title	Year	Note(s)
Undercover Angels: Sex, Spies, and Surveillance	2005	Documentary
The Sun's Search for the Moon	2007	Mini-series
Lani's Story	2010	Documentary
Storm Surfers: New Zealand	2010	Television film
A Place to Call Home	2013–present	
Carlotta	2014	Television film
Winter	2015	
House of Hancock	2015	Miniseries
Catching Milat	2015	Miniseries
Peter Allen: Not the Boy Next Door	2015	Miniseries
Home and Away: An Eye for an Eye	2015	Television film
Wanted	2016–present	
Hyde & Seek	2016–present	
The Secret Daughter	2016–present	
Confess	2017	1 episode: "They're All Confessions"
Blindspotting	2021–2023	

== Awards and nominations ==
=== APRA Music Awards ===
The APRA Music Awards are sets of annual awards to celebrate excellence in contemporary music, which honour the skills of member composers, songwriters and publishers who have achieved outstanding success in sales and airplay performance. They are presented by APRA AMCOS (Australasian Performing Right Association and Australasian Mechanical Copyright Owners Society), which commenced in 1982. The APRA Awards include the Screen Music Awards, which were first presented in 2002 by APRA AMCOS and the Australian Guild of Screen Composers (AGSC). The APRA Awards also include the Art Music Music Awards (formerly Classical Music Awards), which are distributed by APRA AMCOS and the Australian Music Centre (AMC) since 2001.

Year	Nominee / work	Award	Result	Ref.
2002	No Surrender (Michael Yezerski)	Best Music for a Short Film	Won	
2006	Cape of Storms (Yezerski, Richard Tognetti, Afro Moses, Chris Nelius)	Best Music for a Documentary	Nominated	
2006	Thursday's Fictions (Yezerski)	Best Music for a Mini-Series or Telemovie	Nominated	
2006	"Aria" (Yezerski) from Thursday's Fiction	Best Original Song Composed for the Screen	Won	
2006	Thursday's Fictions (Yezerski)	Best Soundtrack Album	Nominated	
2008	"The Greatest Act in History" (Yezerski) from The Black Balloon	Best Original Song Composed for the Screen	Nominated	
2008	"When We Get There" (Josh Pyke, Yezerski) from The Black Balloon	Best Original Song Composed for the Screen	Won	
2008	The Black Balloon (Yezerski)	Best Soundtrack Album	Won	
2009	The Red Tree (Yezerski, Tognetti)	Best Composition by an Australian Composer	Nominated	
2010	The Waiting City (Yezerski)	Best Feature Film Score	Nominated	
2010	The Lost Thing (Yezerski)	Best Music for a Short Film	Won	
2011	SBS – "Films 2" (Yezerski)	Best Music for an Advertisement	Nominated	
2011	The Lost Thing (Yezerski)	Best Soundtrack Album	Nominated	
2012	Storms Surfers 3D (Tognetti, Yezerski)	Feature Film Score of the Year	Nominated	
2013	Storms Surfers 3D (Tognetti, Yezerski)	Best Soundtrack Album	Nominated	
2016	Peter Allen: Not the Boy Next Door (Yezerski, Ashley Irwin)	Best Music for a Mini-Series or Telemovie	Nominated	
2016	Ravens (Yezerski, Helen Grimley)	Best Music for a Short Film	Nominated	
2016	Wanted "Series 1 Episode 6" (Yezerski)	Best Music for a Television Series or Serial	Nominated	
2016	Only the Dead (Yezerski)	Best Soundtrack Album	Nominated	
2019	Dead Lucky (Yezerski)	Best Music for a Mini-Series or Telemovie	Won	
2019	Dead Lucky (Yezerski)	Best Television Theme	Nominated	
2020	The Vigil (Yezerski)	Feature Film Score of the Year	Nominated	
2020	Yezerski	Most Performed Screen Composer – Overseas	Nominated	
2021	The Tax Collector (Yezerski)	Feature Film Score of the Year	Nominated	
2021	The Vigil (Yezerski)	Best Soundtrack Album	Nominated	
2021	Yezerski	Most Performed Screen Composer – Overseas	Nominated	
2022	Blindspotting (Yezerski, Ambrose Akinmusire)	Best Music for a Television Series or Serial	Nominated	
2023	Ivy + Bean (Yezerski)	Best Music for Children's Programming	Won	
2023	Guillermo del Toro's Cabinet of Curiosities: Episode 5: "Pickman's Model" (Yezerski)	Best Music for a Mini-Series or Telemovie	Nominated	
2023	Ivy + Bean (Yezerski)	Best Television Theme	Won	
