= Australian independent film =

An Australian Independent Film, is an Australian film which is produced without government funding. This does not include deductions in the form of special tax concessions or rebates, but refers to up front financial investment from any local, state or commonwealth government authority, or the state and federal film funding bodies, such as Screen Australia, The New South Wales Film and Television Office, Screen Queensland, ScreenWest, The Australian Broadcasting Corporation, and The South Australian Film Corporation.

Australian Independent Films do not include films that would be classed as Studio Films, yet Australia does not have a studio system as such. In Australia the central and most powerful film bureaucracy is the government and the industry is dominated by government-funded films.

== Early films ==
Australia was a prolific independent filmmaking nation through the early days of cinema. During the period from 1910 to 1912 some 33 feature films were produced. Following the success of The Story of the Kelly Gang in 1906, there was a mini boom in 'bushranger films'. This ended in 1912 when the government banned production of all bushranger films due to a perceived civil unrest they were causing. This coincided with the formation of 'the combine', an amalgamation of cinemas under Union Theatres and distributors under Australasian films which found buying and screening foreign films more cost-effective than local films. From 1913, Australian film production contracted until John Gorton established the Australian Film Development Corporation in 1970 which provided loans and equity to Australian producers. Since then Australian Government Films have come to dominate the Australian film landscape.

== List of films ==
There have been some very successful Independent Australian Films, arguably more successful than the Australian Government Films. A list of Australian Independent Films is below:

- The Story of The Kelly Gang (1906) – said to be the world's first feature film
- Jedda (1955) – First Australian Film to have two indigenous lead actors
- Three in a Million (1960) – AFI winner for Best Film
- They're a Weird Mob (1966) – Said to have been a leading factor in the founding of the modern Australian Film Industry
- Walkabout (1971) – First film appearance of David Gulpilil
- Stork (1972) – AFI winner Best Film. Director Tim Burstall is said to have hated the idea of public film funding
- Alvin Purple (1973) – Also by Tim Burstall
- Mad Max (1979) – Held the world record for the highest profit-to-cost ratio for a motion picture
- Crocodile Dundee (1986) – Second highest-grossing film worldwide in 1986, beaten only by Top Gun
- The Castle (1997)
- Gabriel (2007)
- The Combination (2009)
- Crawl Space (2012)
- The Water Diviner (2014) – The highest grossing Australian film of 2014
