= Oliver Woodward =

Australian soldier

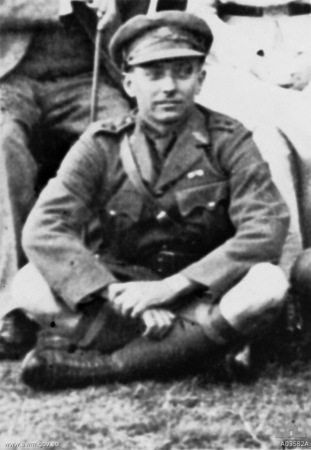
- Captain Oliver Woodward c. 1917
- Born: 8 October 1885; Tenterfield, New South Wales
- Died: 24 August 1966 (aged 80); Hobart, Tasmania
- Military career
- Allegiance: Australia
- Branch: Australian Imperial Force
- Service years: 1915–1919
- Rank: Captain
- Unit: 1st Australian Tunnelling Company
- Conflicts: First World War; Western Front; Battle of Messines; Battle of Hill 60
- Awards: Companion of the Order of St Michael and St George; Military Cross & Two Bars; Mentioned in Despatches
- Other work: President of the Australian Mining and Metals Association (1952–54)

Oliver Holmes Woodward, CMG, MC & Two Bars (8 October 1885 – 24 August 1966) was an Australian metallurgist, mine manager, and soldier noted for his tunnelling activities at the Ypres Salient during the First World War.

== Early life ==
Woodward was born in Tenterfield, New South Wales, on 8 October 1885 to a pioneering family of Scottish ancestry who had been among the first settlers in the district. He was educated at public schools and for two years at Newington College (1903–04).

== First World War ==
Woodward was made an acting captain on 23 October 1916. On 9 November, the 1st Australian Tunnelling Company took over tunnelling operations under the German lines near Messines and safeguarded two mines, one (Hill 60) charged with 53,000 pounds (24,000 kg) of Ammonal explosive and the other (The Caterpillar) with 70,000 pounds (32,000 kg). The mines had been earlier laid by the 3rd Canadian Tunnelling Company. At the start of the Battle of Messines, on 7 June 1917, Woodward had the duty of detonating the two mines.

== Post-war life ==
On 3 September 1920, Woodward married Marjorie Moffat Waddell. They had a daughter and two sons.

Woodward later had a distinguished civil mining career. In 1935 he became the general manager of North Broken Hill, and was appointed to the board of directors in 1944. He retired as general manager in 1947, but was a director until 1961. He was a member of the Australasian Institute of Mining and Metallurgy council, and its president in 1940.

In 1952, Woodward moved from Adelaide to Hobart, Tasmania and died there on 24 August 1966. He was cremated; a memorial plaque to Woodward and his wife is in the Derwent Gardens section of the Cornelian Bay Cemetery, Hobart.

== Awards and decorations ==
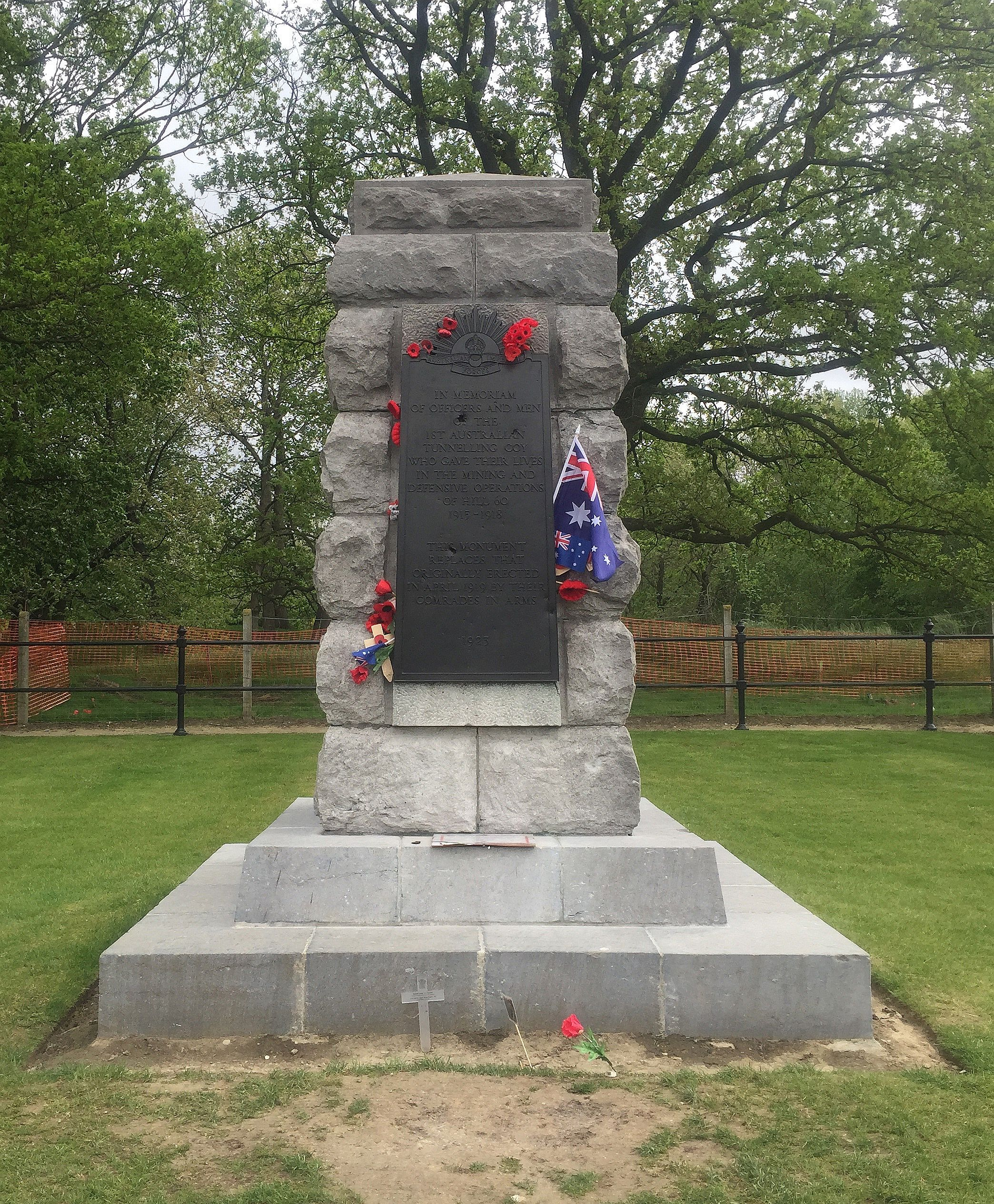
Hill 60, 1st Australian Tunnelling Company Memorial

Woodward was awarded the Military Cross and Two Bars, for the following three actions:

- Military Cross: awarded for actions at Le Touquet on 10–11 June 1916. Citation: "For conspicuous gallantry and determination when, after repeated attempts under very difficult circumstances, he succeeded in blowing up a ruined house 120 yards from our trenches. This house had been frequently used as an enemy sniper post." The ruined house was known as "The Red House".
- Bar to Military Cross: awarded for actions at Bony, Aisne on 29 September 1918. Citation: "On September 29th, 1918, at Bony, he was in charge of three sections working on a forward road, under heavy enemy shell and machine-gun fire. Owing to the infantry advance being checked, the position on the forward road became very involved. By his courage and resourcefulness in patrolling the road and organising the work he succeeded in carrying the work forward, thus enabling the subsequent attacks to be carried through. He set a fine example to his men at a time when casualties were heavy and rendered throughout the day very valuable and accurate reports".
- Second Bar to Military Cross: awarded for actions at Rejet-de-Beaulieu on 4 November 1918. Citation: "For conspicuous gallantry and devotion to duty on the night of the 3rd/4th November 1918, at Rejet de Beaulieu, when his section was entrusted with the construction of a heavy bridge to carry tanks. The successful completion of this work within five hours after zero was mainly due to his detailed preparations made at very short notice under intense artillery and machine-gun fire". His commanding officer had recommended him for the award of the Distinguished Service Order, but this was later downgraded to a second bar to the Military Cross.

In the 1956 New Year Honours, Woodward was appointed a Companion of the Order of St Michael and St George for "services to Mining and Metallurgy in the Commonwealth of Australia".

== Depictions in fiction ==
The 2010 film Beneath Hill 60 is based on Woodward's exploits during the First World War with the 1st Australian Tunnelling Company. Woodward is played by Brendan Cowell.
