= Dany Cooper =

Australian film editor

- Born: Australia
- Occupation: film editor

Dany Cooper is an Australian film editor, best known for her work on Candy, Queen of the Damned and The Sapphires. Cooper is a member of the ASE guild.

== Filmography ==
Year	Film	Director	Notes
1990	Beyond El Rocco	Kevin Lucas	Documentary
1993	Black River	Kevin Lucas	
1995	Angel Baby	Michael Rymer	AACTA Award for Best Editing
1995	Ladies Please!	Andrew Saw	Documentary
1996	Naked: Stories of Men	Various	TV show
1996	River Street	Tony Mahood	
1997	The Well	Samantha Lang	Nominated – AACTA Award for Best Editing
1997	Allie & Me	Michael Rymer	
1999	In Too Deep	Michael Rymer	
2000	The Monkey's Mask	Samantha Lang	
2001	Perfume	Michael Rymer; Hunter Carson	
2002	Queen of the Damned	Michael Rymer	
2002	Haunted	Various	TV show
2004	Battlestar Galactica	Various	TV show
2006	Bye Bye Tim	Gary Eck	Short film
2006	Candy	Neil Armfield	ASE Award for Best Editing in a Feature Film; Nominated – AACTA Award for Best Editing
2007	December Boys	Rod Hardy	
2007	Bionic Woman	Various	TV show
2008	Hey, Hey, It's Esther Blueburger	Cathy Randall	
2010	Beneath Hill 60	Jeremy Sims	ASE Award for Best Editing in a Feature Film; FCCA Award for Best Editor; Nominated – AACTA Award for Best Editing
2010	Oranges and Sunshine	Jim Loach	ASE Award for Best Editing in a Feature Film; Nominated – AACTA Award for Best Editing; Nominated – Inside Film Award for Best Editing
2011	The Sellers	Maia Horniak	Telemovie
2011	Waiting for the Turning of the Earth	David Giles	Short film
2012	The Sapphires	Wayne Blair	AACTA Award for Best Editing; Nominated – AFCA Award for Best Editing; Nominated – ASE Award for Best Editing in a Feature Film; Nominated – FCCA Award for Best Editor
2013	The Turning	The Turning Ensemble	Nominated – AACTA Award for Best Editing
2013	Redfern Now	Various	TV show
2014	Stuffed	Warwick Young	Short film
2015	Deadline Gallipoli	Michael Rymer	Episode 1 Nominated – AACTA Award for Best Television Editing
2015	Holding the Man	Neil Armfield	ASE Award for Best Editing in a Feature Film; Nominated – AACTA Award for Best Editing; Nominated – FCCA Award for Best Editor
2017	Breath	Simon Baker	
2017	Cargo	Ben Howling; Yolanda Ramke	
2018	Measure of a Man	Jim Loach	
2019	Judy and Punch	Mirrah Foulkes	Nominated – AACTA Award for Best Editing
2019	I Am Woman	Unjoo Moon	Nominated – AACTA Award for Best Editing
2019	The Commons	Rowan Woods	TV show, 2 episodes
2021	The Drover's Wife	Leah Purcell	
2022	Blaze	Del Kathryn Barton	Nominated – AACTA Award for Best Editing
2022	Carmen	Benjamin Millepied	
TBA	The Lost Flowers of Alice Hart	Glendyn Ivin	TV show
