= The Legend of Damien Parer =

- Directed by: Gil Brealey
- Written by: Maslyn Williams, Frank Legg
- Produced by: Kip Porteous
- Narrated by: Kevin Chapman
- Cinematography: William Grimmond
- Edited by: Rodric Adamson
- Release date: 1964
- Running time: 50 min
- Country: Australia
- Language: English

The Legend of Damien Parer is a 1964 Australian documentary film on war photographer Damien Parer. It included footage he had filmed and interviews of those who knew him. It was first broadcast on ABC TV on Anzac day when it was met with critical acclaim. The film won the 1964 Australian Film Institute award for Best Documentary.
