= Australian Screen Editors =

Australian Screen Editors (ASE) was founded in 1995 by a group of Screen Editors who gathered at the Harold Park Hotel in Sydney to discuss working conditions and schedules being badly affected by the perceived efficiencies of the new non-linear editing systems being introduced, and issues arising from the funding bodies dictating crewing.Film Editor Henry Dangar became its first president and Jenny Ward became Vice President. The guild is "dedicated to the pursuit and recognition of excellence in the arts, sciences and technology of motion picture and televisual post production. It aims to promote, improve and protect the role of editor as an essential and significant contributor to all screen productions."

The current President of ASE is Scott Walmsley. Immediate past presidents include Danielle Boesenberg, Fiona Strain, Deborah Peart, Dany Cooper, Jason Ballantine, Karen Pearlman, Lindi Harrison and Peter Whitmore. It currently has over 1000 members in all Australian states, predominantly in NSW and Victoria.

== Membership ==
Applications for ASE membership are invited from professional screen editors, assistant editors, students of screen editing and associated film industry professionals. Applicants must have a folio of significant editorial work in film and/or television. There are three types of memberships: Full members, associate members and student members. Some notable members such as Jill Bilcock are members of both the Australian Screen Editors and American Cinema Editors. Members are not permitted to use the acronym "ASE" after their names on screen credits until they obtain ASE accreditation.

== Accreditation ==
ASE accreditation is like an honorary degree given to members who have made a significant contribution to editing. There are currently 46 accredited members. Accreditation is presented at the annual ASE awards night and are given under the following guidelines.

- It is an acknowledgement of a very strong body of work over a period of time.
- It is given by editing peers and therefore has a high value attached to it.
- It is an acknowledgement of an editor who has continued to pass on the craft of editing to those who want to learn.
- It is an acknowledgement of an editor who has continued to work actively in promoting the values of good editing and editing practices.

== Guild structure ==
The ASE has an executive committee based in Sydney (New South Wales) and sub committees in Melbourne (Victoria), Brisbane (Queensland), Perth (Western Australia) and Adelaide (South Australia), who meet monthly to discuss issues and organise events such as talks by industry professionals, technical events and screenings.

== Resources ==
ASE owns and operates both "Editsearch", an online based bulletin board for ASE members providing information on editorial related jobs, and a mentor scheme, where younger or less experienced members can gain work experience with senior industry professionals. In addition, ASE also provides a wealth of resources such as an online forum, technical articles and information about Australian editing culture as well as the history of editing. A newsletter is also published quarterly and distributed to members.

== Awards ==
ASE awards and accreditation nights are held annually in Sydney. Eligible members are presented with their ASE accreditation during this ceremony.

The ASE Award itself is called an "Ellie" and is a crystal rectangle with a corner that has been "cut" off. The front of the award an engraving of an elephant with the winners information engraved on its side. The elephant is a reference to the previous award that was an elephant cast in solid bronze.

It is presented in the following thirteen categories:

- Comedy
- Commercials
- Documentary & Documentary Series
- Documentary Feature
- Drama
- Drama Feature
- Drama Short
- Factual Entertainment
- Music Video
- Open Content
- Reality TV
- Technical Excellence
- Trailers & Promos

Complementing the Ellie awards are two Emerging Editor categories that recognise early career practitioners.

- Emerging Editor - Student
- Emerging Editor - Early Career

=== Best Editing in a Feature Film ===
Year	Title	Recipient(s)
2021	Nitram	Nick Fenton
2021	I Met a Girl	Phillip Horn
2021	The Furnace	Merlin Eden
2021	June Again	Mark Warner
2020	The Invisible Man	Andy Canny
2020	Hearts and Bones	Phillip Horn
2020	True History of the Kelly Gang	Nick Fenton
2020	Unsound	Scott Walmsley
2019	Ladies in Black	Mark Warner
2019	I Am Mother	Sean Lahiff
2019	Judy and Punch	Dany Cooper
2019	Sequin in a Blue Room	Tim Guthrie
2018	Breath	Dany Cooper
2018	Jirga	Nikki Stevens
2018	Jungle	Sean Lahiff
2018	Sweet Country	Nick Meyers
2018	Upgrade	Andy Canny
2017	Lion	Alexandre de Franceschi
2017	Dance Academy: The Movie	Geoffrey Lamb
2017	Don't Tell	Peter Carrodus
2017	Hounds of Love	Merlin Eden
2016	Tanna	Tania Nehme
2016	The Daughter	Veronika Jenet
2016	Girl Asleep	Karryn de Cinque
2016	A Month of Sundays	Ken Sallows
2016	Restoration	Cindy Clarkson
2015	Holding the Man	Dany Cooper
2015	Is This the Real World	Ben Joss
2015	One Eyed Girl	David Ngo
2015	Paper Planes	Nick Meyers
2014	52 Tuesdays	Bryan Mason
2014	The Little Death	Christian Gazal
2014	The Railway Man	Martin Connor
2013	The Rocket	Nick Meyers
2013	The Great Gatsby	Jason Ballantine, Jonathan Redmond
2013	Goddess	Mark Warner
2012	Burning Man	Martin Connor
2012	Mental	Jill Bilcock
2012	The Sapphires	Dany Cooper
2012	Wish You Were Here	Jason Ballantine
2011	Oranges and Sunshine	Dany Cooper
2011	Blame	Meredith Watson Jeffrey
2011	Mad Bastards	Claire Fletcher
2011	Tomorrow, When the War Began	Marcus D'Arcy
2010	Beneath Hill 60	Dany Cooper
2010	Animal Kingdom	Luke Doolan
2010	Balibo	Nick Meyers
2010	Bright Star	Alexandre de Franceschi
2010	Coffin Rock	Adrian Rostirolla
2009	Samson & Delilah	Roland Gallois
2009	Australia	Dody Dorn, Michael McCusker
2009	Beautiful Kate	Veronika Jenet
2009	Two Fists, One Heart	Deborah Peart, Milena Romanin
2008	The Painted Veil	Alexandre de Francheschi
2008	The Black Balloon	Veronika Jenet
2008	Men's Group	Stuart Morley
2008	Rogue	Jason Ballantine
2007	Romulus My Father	Suresh Ayyar
2007	Clubland	Scott Gray
2007	Lucky Miles	Henry Dangar
2007	West	Roland Gallois
2006	Candy	Dany Cooper
2006	The Caterpillar Wish	Jason Ballantine
2006	The Libertine	Jill Bilcock

=== Best Editing in a Documentary Feature ===
- 2014: Once my Mother, Denise Haslem
- 2013: Show Me The Magic, Scott Walton
- 2012: Paul Kelly: Stories of Me, Sally Fryer
- 2011: Girls Own War Stories, Antoinette Ford
- 2010: My Asian Heart, Andrew Arestides
- 2009: A Good Man, Nicholas Beauman
- 2008: The Cars That Ate China, Andrew Arestides
- 2007: Choir of Hard Knocks, Steve Robinson
- 2006: Unfolding Florence, Nick Beauman

=== Best Editing in a Documentary Program ===
- 2014: Cronulla Riots – The Day That Shocked the Nation, Melanie Annan
- 2013: Buckskin, David Banbury
- 2012: A Law Unto Himself, Andrea Lang

=== Best Editing in a Documentary Series ===
- 2014: Kakadu – Ep 4, Caspar Mazzotti
- 2013: Desert War Ep 1, ‘Tobruk’, Lawrence Silvestrin
- 2012: Australian Story, ‘Streets with No Names’, Steven Baras-Miller

=== Best Editing in Television Drama ===
- 2014: Redfern Now: Where the Heart Is, Nicholas Holmes
- 2013: Devil's Dust Part 2, Katrina Barker
- 2012: The Slap, Episode 1 ‘Hector’, Mark Atkin
- 2011: Spirited, Series 1, Episode 2, Martin Connor
- 2010: Packed to the Rafters, Episode 44, James Manche
- 2009: Underbelly: A Tale of Two Cities, Episode 4, Deborah Peart
- 2008: Underbelly, Episode 9, Peter Carrodus
- 2007: Bastard Boys, Veronika Jenet
- 2006: The Society Murders, Ken Sallows

=== Best Editing in a Television Comedy ===
- 2014: The Moodys – Ep 1, Paul Swain

=== Best Editing in Television Factual ===
- 2014: Taking on the Chocolate Frog – Ep 1, Marcos Moro
- 2013: Kings Cross ER, Series 2, Ep 1, Bob Burns
- 2012: Go Back To Where You Came From, Series 2, Episode 1, Orly Danon
- 2011: On Trial, Episode 1, Denise Haslem
- 2010: The Science of Teens, Episode 4: Moods, Fiona Strain
- 2009: Bondi Vet, Episode 12, Dave Redman
- 2008: Charlotte & Jordans Runway to LA, Episode 2, Philippa Rowlands
- 2007: Jamie's Kitchen, Australia, Episode 5, Philippa Rowlands

=== Best Editing in a Commercial ===
- 2014: RACQ ‘Rescue Me’, Sue Schweikert
- 2013: John West ‘Running with the Bears’, David Whittaker
- 2012: Volkswagen Tiguan ‘Cross Country’, Drew Thompson
- 2011: AB ‘3 Year Olds’, Bernard Garry
- 2010: ANZ ‘The Chase’, Peter Whitmore
- 2008: Toyota ‘Earth's Greatest 4WD’, Drew Thompson

=== Best Editing in a Music Video ===
- 2014: Belle Roscoe ‘Let Me Cut in’, Scott Walmsley
- 2013: ‘Come into My Head’ Kimbra, John Gavin
- 2012: Angus Stone ‘Bird on the Buffalo’, Peter Barton
- 2011: Schvendes ‘Lay the Noose’, Matt Osborne
- 2010: The Thomas Oliver Band ‘Goin’ Home’, Katie Hinsen

=== Best Editing in a Short film ===
Year	Title	Recipient(s)
2014	Godel Incomplete	Gwendalina Sputore
2014	Rabbit	Patrick McCabe
2014	I am Emmanuel	Adrian Rostirolla
2014	The Landing	Derryn Watts
2013	No Quarter	Alexandre Guterres
2013	Time	Scott Walmsley
2013	All God's Creatures	Kelly Cameron & Mary Elizabeth Hutson
2013	Cargo	Shannon Longville
2012	The Wilding	Anthony Cox
2012	Dave's Dead	Annabelle Johnson
2012	Peekaboo	Katie Flaxman
2012	Spine	Melanie Annan
2011	Something Fishy	Melanie Annan
2011	Fully Famous	Brad Hurt
2011	Kiss	Danielle Boesenberg
2011	Ostia – La Notte Finale	Adrian Chiarella
2010	The Love Song of Iskra Prufrock	Adrian Chiarella
2010	Driven	Fiona Strain
2010	Drowning	Adrian Rosirolla
2010	Entanglement Theory	Karen Pearlman
2009	Bleeders	Zen Rosenthal
2009	Plastic	Ann Foo & Vladimir Jovičić
2009	Salt	Lindi Harrison & Ingunn Jordansen
2009	Boundless	Christopher Mill
2008	The Ground Beneath	Adrian Rostirolla
2008	Jerrycan	Jack Hutchings
2008	Four	Zen Rosenthal
2008	A Natural Talent	Katrina Barker
2007	25 cents	Richard Greenhalgh
2007	Meditations on a Name	Peter Crombie
2007	Len's Love Story	Jodie Gallacher
2007	Pension Day	Trevor Holcomb
2006	Brother	Hayley Lake
2006	A Message From Fallujah	Adam Wills
2006	Sexy Thing	Milena Romanin
2006	Vend	JC Frugaard

=== Best Editing in Open Content ===
- 2014: Canon, Jessica Mutascio
- 2013: Fragments of Friday Ep 5, Ann Foo
- 2012: Event Zero, Episode 4, Julian Harvey

=== Accreditations ===
- 2014: Karin Steininger
- 2013: Christopher Branagan, Deborah Peart

=== Lifetime Membership Award ===
- 2014: Nicholas Beauman
- 2013: Mike Honey

== See also ==
- American Cinema Editors
