= Little Hands (2011 film) =

2011 film

Little Hands is an Australian film directed by Claire McCarthy.

The film stars Dinka Džubur and Miraj Grbić, and was an Official Selection in 2011 Pula Film Festival in Pula, Croatia and 2012 Flickerfest in Sydney, Australia. Dinka Džubur won the International Award for Best Actress in a leading role for her portrayal of Mia in Little Hands. Little Hands was also awarded an Innovation in Film and Leadership Award from the Australian Embassy of Bosnia & Herzegovina and screened to American audiences at the American Cinematheque to a positive reception.

== Synopsis ==
Set in the war-torn medieval province of Bosnia and Herzegovina, Little Hands is the story of a young Australian tourist, Mia (Dinka Džubur), her journey to bridge the gap between her unwilling separation from her younger sister, Sofia and the trauma of her experiences during the Balkan war.

Utilising the backdrop and grace of the city Mostar, the story follows Mia's return home after an absence of ten years. Encouraged by news that her sister has returned from a former foster home, Mia finds her sister at an orphanage, withdrawn and incommunicative.

Not ready to reveal her true motives, Mia conceals her identity to the orphanage carers and attempts to connect to the children, in particular her sister.

Hapless social worker Marsel (Miraj Grbić), initially flirting with Mia as an Australian tourist, overhears her speaking in native tongue to the children and becomes suspicious.

As Mia grapples with the decision to expose her true relationship to her sister and whether or not to return with her to Australia, Marsel starts to form a plan of his own.

The trio go horse riding one afternoon. Mia and Sofia connect for the very first time. In the beautiful and tranquil terrain, everyone is in good spirits. Until Marsel confronts Mia with the truth of who she really is.

Mia, accepting that love and family is worth fighting for, finds the courage to return home to Australia and start a life together with her new family.

== See also ==
- Cinema of Australia
