= The Daughter (2015 film) =

2015 film

- Theatrical release poster
- Directed by: Simon Stone
- Screenplay by: Simon Stone
- Based on: The Wild Duck by Henrik Ibsen
- Produced by: Jan Chapman; Nicole O'Donohue
- Starring: Geoffrey Rush; Ewen Leslie; Paul Schneider; Miranda Otto; Anna Torv; Odessa Young; Sam Neill
- Cinematography: Andrew Commis
- Edited by: Veronika Jenet
- Music by: Mark Bradshaw
- Production company: Screen NSW
- Distributed by: Roadshow Films
- Release dates: 4 June 2015 (Sydney); 17 March 2016
- Running time: 95 minutes
- Country: Australia
- Language: English

The Daughter is a 2015 Australian drama film written and directed by Simon Stone, based on Henrik Ibsen's 1884 play The Wild Duck. It stars an ensemble cast led by Geoffrey Rush.

The film premiered at the 2015 Sydney Film Festival, and was released in Australia by Roadshow Films on 17 March 2016 to generally favourable reviews.

== Plot ==
Christian Nielsen, a recovering alcoholic, returns home to Australia from the United States for the wedding of his father, Henry, to his much younger housekeeper, Anna. Christian's relationship with his father is strained as Christian believes Henry did not sufficiently look after his ill wife and Christian's mother, eventually leading to her suicide. Christian does not approve of the wedding to the much younger housekeeper.

He meets up with his childhood friend Oliver and gets introduced to Oliver's wife Charlotte and their daughter Hedvig. He finds out that Charlotte was many years for a short time Henry's housekeeper and he realises that Charlotte had at that time an affair with Henry. Confronting Charlotte with this, she begs him to let sleeping dogs lie. Christian, feeling miserable as his partner terminates their relationship in a phone call, begins drinking again. At the wedding, being seriously drunk, he tells Oliver about the affair of Charlotte and Henry.

Oliver is devastated and confronts Charlotte. In the heated discussion, he realises that Charlotte was at that time pregnant from Henry and that Hedvig is not his biological daughter. He rushes to beat Henry in the face and leaves the wedding party. Christian tells the devastated Charlotte that he did not know about Hedvig. Charlotte begs him to not tell Hedvig.

The next day, Christian meets Hedvig outside the motel where Oliver is staying. He tells her that Henry is her biological father. She goes to Oliver and begs him to pretend he does not know all this as to her it makes no difference, but Oliver rejects her. Hedvig tries to take her own life using her grandfather's shotgun but survives with heavy injuries. Oliver and Charlotte reunite in the hospital, where Hedvig lies in recovery.

== Cast ==
- Paul Schneider as Christian Nielsen
- Geoffrey Rush as Henry Nielsen, Christian's father
- Ewen Leslie as Oliver Finch, Christian's childhood friend and Charlotte's husband
- Miranda Otto as Charlotte Finch, Oliver's wife
- Odessa Young as Hedvig Finch, Charlotte and Oliver's daughter
- Anna Torv as Anna, Henry's housekeeper and wife-to-be
- Sam Neill as Walter Finch, Oliver's father
- Nicholas Hope as Peterson

== Release ==
The Daughter was shown in the Special Presentations section of the 2015 Toronto International Film Festival. The film was released in Australia on 17 March 2016.

== Reception ==
The Daughter received generally positive reviews from critics. On review aggregator website Rotten Tomatoes, the film has an approval rating of 77% based on 61 reviews, with an average rating of 6.90/10. The critical consensus reads, "With The Daughter, debuting writer-director Simon Stone turns Henrik Ibsen's The Wild Duck into a thoughtful meditation on the bonds of family, friendship, and community." On Metacritic, the film has a weighted average score of 62 out of 100 based on 12 reviews, indicating "generally favorable reviews".

Jessica Kiang of IndieWire gave the film a B+, saying in her closing comments that it is "a highly polished film that belies the soap opera melodrama of its plotline by having the twists and turns spring directly from well-observed human behavior. Stone's The Daughter is a quiet, immensely affecting triumph that proves how, contrary to accepted wisdom, there are secrets that would better remain untold."

Wendy Ide of The Guardian gave the film 4 out of 5, saying that "A family's long-buried secret is unearthed in an Ibsen adaptation marked by fine performances". Eddie Cockrell of Variety compared The Daughter to another directors' masterpiece, The Wild Duck. Rochelle Siemienowicz of SBS was quoted saying that "[the film is] confident, low-key modernising of classic European material for the Australian setting."

=== Accolades ===
| Award | Date of ceremony | Category | Recipient(s) | Result |
|---|---|---|---|---|
| AACTA Awards | 7 December 2016 | Best Film | Jan Chapman and Nicole O'Donohue | Nominated |
| AACTA Awards | 7 December 2016 | Best Adapted Screenplay | Simon Stone | Won |
| AACTA Awards | 7 December 2016 | Best Actor | Ewen Leslie | Nominated |
| AACTA Awards | 7 December 2016 | Best Actress | Odessa Young | Won |
| AACTA Awards | 7 December 2016 | Best Supporting Actor | Sam Neill | Nominated |
| AACTA Awards | 7 December 2016 | Best Supporting Actress | Miranda Otto | Won |
| AACTA Awards | 7 December 2016 | Best Supporting Actress | Anna Torv | Nominated |
| AACTA Awards | 7 December 2016 | Best Editing | Veronika Jenet | Nominated |
| AACTA Awards | 7 December 2016 | Best Sound | Yulia Akerholt, James Andrews, Liam Egan, Nick Emond, Tony Murtagh and Robert Sullivan | Nominated |
| AACTA Awards | 7 December 2016 | Best Production Design | Steven Jones-Evans | Nominated |
| ASE Award | | Best Editing in a Feature Film | Veronika Jenet | Nominated |

== See also ==
- The Wild Duck (1984 film)
