= Concerto for Orchestra (film) =

- Directed by: Robert Parker
- Written by: Robert Parker
- Produced by: Malcolm Otton
- Music by: Béla Bartók
- Release date: 1965
- Running time: 26 min
- Country: Australia
- Language: English

Concerto for Orchestra is a 1965 Australian short documentary film featuring conductor Dean Dixon and the Sydney Symphony Orchestra. It shows a behind the scenes look at some members of the orchestra and rehearsal at the Sydney Town Hall. It is named for Béla Bartók's Concerto for Orchestra which features in the film. It was one of a Australia Today series of films commissioned by the Australian Broadcasting Commission and was broadcast on the ABC TV on 12 July 1965. The film won the 1966 Australian Film Institute award for Best Documentary.
