= Cardin in Australia =

- Directed by: Peter Thompson
- Release date: 1968
- Country: Australia
- Language: English

Cardin in Australia is a 1968 Australian film about Pierre Cardin's visit to Australia at the invitation of the Australian Wool Board, who invited the French fashion designer to promote his designs and his use of wool in his collections, highlighting the value of wool as a fashion item. The film won the 1967 Australian Film Institute award for Best Documentary. It also won the 1967 Australian Film Institute award for best editing in a non-feature film.
