= The Change at Groote =

- Directed by: Stefan Sargent
- Release date: 1968
- Running time: 27 min
- Country: Australia
- Language: English

The Change at Groote is a 1968 Australian film which examined how the Anindilyakwa people of Groote Eylandt in the Northern Territory, Australia, adjusted to the change in their lifestyle which resulted from the discovery of manganese on their land. The director and writer of the film described it as "a fragmented collage of images and sounds, intended to produce a direct emotional response" and "a study of a complete cultural revolution in less than a generation". It was produced by the Australian Commonwealth Film Unit.

It won five awards including sharing the 1968 Australian Film Institute (AFI) Golden Reel Award for Best Documentary for non-fiction "for both the adventurous film making strategies and for the sentiments it evoked", the Adelaide Advertiser (newspaper) Award for the Best Australian Film of 1968 and the 1968 Film Editors Guild of Australia Award.
