= Claire McCarthy =

Australian film director

- Born: Sydney, Australia
- Occupations: Filmmaker, writer, director, producer, artist
- Spouse: Denson Baker (m. 2009)
- Writing career
- Years active: 1999–present
- Genres: Suspense, drama, documentary, romance

Claire McCarthy is an Australian screenwriter, director, producer, and visual artist.

== Early life ==
McCarthy was born in Sydney, the daughter of Christine, an author and concert pianist, and John McCarthy KC. She attended Meriden School in the early 1990s and graduated with honours from the University of Technology, Sydney with a Bachelor of Design/Communications majoring in film in 1997. She is a screen directing graduate of the Australian Film, Television and Radio School from 2001.

== Career ==
=== Directing ===
Claire McCarthy has been making short films, music videos, documentaries, and feature films since 2007. Her films have screened at the following international festivals: Toronto International Film Festival, Tunis International Film Festival, Indian Film Festival of Los Angeles, Montreal World Film Festival, New York Film Festival, Pusan International Film Festival, Palm Springs International Film Festival, Flickerfest, St Kilda Film Festival, Sydney Film Festival, and London Film Festival.

Her feature debut, Cross Life (2007), premiered at the Sydney Film Festival (2007) and the Pusan International Film Festival in Korea (2007) and was nominated for an Independent Spirit Award at the 2007 Inside Film Awards. Cross Life was a low-budget, social realist multi-plot about Sydney's Kings Cross red light district, starring Paul Caesar, Imogen Annesley and Tony Barry.

Her 2008 autobiographical documentary film Sisters was awarded a Young Filmmakers Fund grant, from the New South Wales Film and Television Office. Sisters is a 52-minute documentary about her journey to India with her teenage sister Helena, to volunteer with the Mother Teresa's religious institute, the Missionaries of Charity, in Calcutta. Sisters was broadcast on ABC Television in 2008 and 2009, on the Compass program, hosted by Geraldine Doogue.

Building upon relationships she made with fellow volunteers in India, she wrote The Waiting City – a mystic infused drama about a young Australian couple's journey to Calcutta to adopt a baby. The Waiting City was the first Australian feature-length film to be entirely filmed in India. The Waiting City, starring Radha Mitchell, Joel Edgerton, Samrat Chakrabarti and Isabel Lucas had its world premiere at the Toronto International Film Festival, as part of the prestigious "Special Presentation" section. Chakrabarti was named as one of the "Fresh Faces at TIFF" by thestar.com, for his role. The Waiting City has also screened at the Pusan Film Festival (2009), Indian Film Festival of Los Angeles (2010), the Tunis International Film Festival (2010) and the Sydney Film Festival (2010). The film was released nationally in Australia on 15 July 2010 and release in other territories will be later in 2010.

In May 2016 it was announced that McCarthy would be directing an adaptation of The Personal History of Rachel DuPree, which would be produced by Viola Davis. In September 2016 it was announced that Davis will also star in the titular role, with Mahershala Ali as her husband and Quvenzhané Wallis as one of her daughters.

=== Teaching ===
She has taught screenwriting and filmmaking to masters and undergraduate students at Macquarie University. She has also taught screenwriting to special needs students at North Sydney TAFE. In the Australian film The Black Balloon she had the role of choreographer to a group of autistic adults who were starring in the film and also contributed to the musical soundtrack as she also did with Sisters and The Waiting City.

== Personal life ==
She is married to award-winning cinematographer Denson Baker ACS. The couple have collaborated on The Waiting City, The Black Balloon, Skin, and other films, as well as Old Man River's Sunshine music video (set in Varanasi). Sunshine was nominated for an Australian Cinematographers Society Award in 2008 in the "Best Music Video" category.

She divides her time between Sydney and Los Angeles.

== Filmography ==
Film

Year	Title	Director	Writer	Producer
2006	Skin	Yes	Yes	Yes
2007	Cross Life	Yes	Yes	Yes
2009	The Waiting City	Yes	Yes	Yes
2011	Little Hands	Yes	Yes	No
2018	Ophelia	Yes	No	No
2021	The Colour Room	Yes	No	No
TBA	Shiver	Yes	Yes	No

Music video

- "Sunshine" (2006) (For Old Man River)

Documentary film

Year	Title	Director	Writer	Note
2008	Sisters	Yes	Yes	Also camera operator and off-line editor

TV series

Year	Title	Director	Executive Producer	Note
2021	Domina	Yes	Yes	3 episodes

Choreographer

- The Black Balloon (2007)

== Sources ==
- Fulton, Adam (7 July 2010). "The waiting game in a city of spare children". Sydney Morning Herald.
- TIFF Reviews The Waiting City
- Interview with McCarthy (with ABC’s “At The Movies”)
- “At The Movies” Review
