= 2008 Australian Film Institute Awards =

Australian film and TV awards ceremony

50th Australian Film Institute Awards
- Date: 5–6 December 2008
- Site: Princess Theatre, Melbourne
- Hosted by: Stephen Curry

Highlights
- Best Film: The Black Balloon
- Best Direction: Elissa Down; The Black Balloon
- Best Actor: William McInnes; Unfinished Sky
- Best Actress: Monic Hendrickx; Unfinished Sky
- Supporting Actor: Luke Ford; The Black Balloon
- Supporting Actress: Toni Collette; The Black Balloon
- Most awards: The Black Balloon (6); Unfinished Sky (6)
- Most nominations: The Black Balloon (11)

Television coverage
- Network: Nine Network

The 50th Annual Australian Film Institute Awards were presented at a ceremony in Melbourne's Princess Theatre on 5 and 6 December 2008. During the ceremony, the Australian Film Institute presented Australian Film Institute Awards (commonly referred to as AFI Awards) in 40 categories including feature films, television, animation and documentaries. It was hosted by Stephen Curry.

The nominees for Best Documentary, Best Short Fiction Film and Best Short Animation were announced on 7 August, whilst the rest were announced at the Nominations Announcement at the Sydney Theatre Company in Walsh Bay on 29 October. The Black Balloon had the most nominations, with a total of 11 including Best Film.

== Winners and nominees ==
Winners are listed first and highlighted in boldface; with nominees thereafter.

=== Feature Film ===
**Best Film**: **The Black Balloon – Tristram Miall**; The Jammed – Dee McLachlan, Andrea Buck; The Square – Louise Smith; Unfinished Sky – Cathy Overett, Anton Smit	**Best Direction**: **Elissa Down – The Black Balloon**; Peter Duncan – Unfinished Sky; Nash Edgerton – The Square; Dee McLachlan – The Jammed
Best Original Screenplay	Best Adapted Screenplay
**Elissa Down, Jimmy Jack – The Black Balloon**; Cathy Randall – Hey, Hey, It's Esther Blueburger; Dee McLachlan – The Jammed; Joel Edgerton and Matthew Dabner – The Square	**Peter Duncan – Unfinished Sky, based on the film The Polish Bride (1998) by Karim Traïdia and Kees van der Hulst**; Stephen Vagg – All My Friends Are Leaving Brisbane, based on the play All My Friends Are Leaving Brisbane by Stephen Vagg
Best Lead Actor	Best Lead Actress
**William McInnes as John Woldring – Unfinished Sky**; Guy Pearce as Harry Houdini – Death Defying Acts; David Roberts as Raymond Yale – The Square; Rhys Wakefield as Thomas Mollison – The Black Balloon	**Monic Hendrickx as Tahmeena – Unfinished Sky**; Noni Hazlehurst as Penelope Lombard – Bitter & Twisted; Emma Lung as Crystal – The Jammed; Veronica Sywak as Ashley – The Jammed
Best Supporting Actor	Best Supporting Actress
**Luke Ford as Charlie Mollison – The Black Balloon**; Joel Edgerton as Billy – The Square; Anthony Hayes as Greg "Smithy" Smith – The Square; Erik Thomson as Simon Mollison – The Black Balloon	**Toni Collette as Maggie Mollison – The Black Balloon**; Saskia Burmeister as Vanya – The Jammed; Maeve Dermody as Lee – Black Water; Leeanna Walsman as Indigo Samvini – Bitter & Twisted
Best Cinematography	Best Editing
**Robert Humphreys – Unfinished Sky**; Denson Baker – The Black Balloon; Geoffrey Simpson – The Tender Hook; Haris Zambarloukos – Death Defying Acts	**Veronika Jenet – The Black Balloon**; Rodrigo Balart – Black Water; Anne Carter, Maryjeanne Watt – The Jammed; Suresh Ayyar – Unfinished Sky
Best Original Music Score	Best Sound
**Antony Partos – Unfinished Sky**; Michael Yezerski – The Black Balloon; François Tétaz, Ben Lee – The Square; Chris Abrahams – 'The Tender Hook	**Andrew Plain, Anne Breslin, William Ward – Unfinished Sky**; Ben Osmo, Paul Pirola – The Black Balloon; Liam Egan, Tony Murtagh, Phil Judd, Des Kenneally – Hey, Hey, It's Esther Blueburger; Liam Egan, Tony Murtagh, Phil Judd, Gary Wilkins – The Tender Hook
Best Production Design	Best Costume Design
**Gemma Jackson – Death Defying Acts**; Steven Jones-Evans – The Children of Huang Shi; Pete Baxter – The Tender Hook; Laurie Faen – Unfinished Sky	**Cappi Ireland – The Tender Hook**; Shareen Beringer – Hey, Hey, It's Esther Blueburger; Susannah Buxton – Death Defying Acts; Wenyan Gao & Kym Barrett – The Children of Huang Shi

=== Television ===
**Best Drama Series**: **Underbelly – Greg Haddrick & Brenda Pam (Nine Network)**; City Homicide (Series 2) – MaryAnne Carroll (Seven Network); Rush – John Edwards & Mimi Butler (Network Ten); Satisfaction – Andrew Walker & Roger Simpson (Showcase)	**Best Miniseries or Telefeature**: **East West 101 – Steve Knapman & Kris Wyld (SBS)**; Bed of Roses – Stephen Luby & Mark Ruse (ABC); Rain Shadow – Gus Howard (ABC); Valentine's Day – Tony Wright (ABC)
**Best Comedy Series**: **Summer Heights High – Chris Lilley & Laura Waters (ABC)**; Chandon Pictures – Rob Carlton (Movie Network); The Hollowmen – Santo Cilauro, Tom Gleisner & Rob Sitch (ABC); The Librarians – Wayne Hope & Robyn Butler (ABC)	**Best Light Entertainment Television Series**: **Enough Rope with Andrew Denton – Andrew Denton, Anita Jacoby (ABC)**; RocKwiz (Season 5) – Ken Connor, Joe Connor, Peter Bain-Hogg, Brian Nankervis (SBS); Spicks and Specks – Anthony Watt (ABC); The Gruen Transfer – Andrew Denton, Anita Jacoby, Jo Wathen, Jon Casimir (ABC)
**Children's Television Drama**: **Blue Water High (Series 3) – Noel Price, Dennis Kiely (ABC)**; Animalia – Ewan Burnett, Murray Pope (Network Ten); Double Trouble – Rachel Clements, Terry Jennings (Nine Network); H_{2}O: Just Add Water (Series 2) – Jonathan M. Shiff, Joanna Werner (Network Ten)	**Best Direction in Television**: **Peter Andrikidis** **– Underbelly: Episode 7 "Wise Monkeys" (Nine Network)**; Peter Andrikidis – East West 101: Episode 2 "Death At The Station" (SBS); Daina Reid – Satisfaction: Episode 5 "Truth" (Showtime); Stuart McDonald – Summer Heights High: Episode 8 (ABC)
**Best Lead Actor – Drama**: **Gyton Grantley – Underbelly (Nine Network)**; Don Hany – East West 101 (SBS); William McInnes – East West 101 (SBS); Callan Mulvey – Rush (Network Ten)	**Best Lead Actress – Drama**: **Kat Stewart – Underbelly (Nine Network)**; Phoebe Tonkin – H_{2}O: Just Add Water (Network Ten); Alison Whyte – Satisfaction (Showtime); Diana Glenn – Satisfaction (Showtime)
**Best Guest or Supporting Actor – Drama**: **Damian Walshe-Howling – Underbelly (Nine Network)**; Gary Files – Dogstar (Nine Network); Taffy Hany– East West 101 (SBS); Vince Colosimo – Underbelly (Nine Network)	**Best Guest or Supporting Actress – Drama**: **Madeleine West – Underbelly (Nine Network)**; Hanna Mangan-Lawrence – Bed of Roses (ABC); Amanda Muggleton – City Homicide (Seven Network); Brittany Byrnes – H_{2}O: Just Add Water (Network Ten)
**Best Performance in a Television Comedy**: **Chris Lilley – Summer Heights High (ABC)**; Rob Carlton – Chandon Pictures (Movie Network); Rob Sitch – The Hollowmen (ABC); Robyn Butler – The Librarians (ABC)	**Best Screenplay in Television**: **Santo Cilauro, Tom Gleisner and Rob Sitch – The Hollowmen: Episode 1 "Fat Chance" (ABC)**; Philip Dalkin – Dogstar: Episode 26 "Tail's End" (Nine Network); Kris Wyld – East West 101: Episode 2 "Death At The Station" (SBS); Peter Gawler – Underbelly: Episode 2 "The Sorcerer's Apprentice" (Nine Network)

==== AFI Award for Outstanding Achievement in Television Screen Craft ====
- **Steve Evans**. Underbelly. For "Editing"

=== Non-Feature Film ===
Best Documentary	Best Direction in a Documentary
**Not Quite Hollywood – Craig Griffin, Michael Lynch**; Beyond Our Ken – Luke Walker; Rare Chicken Rescue – Vickie Gest, Randall Wood; The Oasis – Ian Darling	**The Oasis** **– Ian Darling, Sascha Ettinger-Epstein**; Beyond Our Ken – Melissa Maclean, Luke Walker; Rachel: A Perfect Life – Fiona Cochrane; Rare Chicken Rescue – Randall Wood
Best Cinematography in a Documentary	Best Editing in a Documentary
**A Northern Town – Andrew Commis, Rachel Landers**; Bomb Harvest – Kim Mordaunt; Night – Laurie McInnes; Rare Chicken Rescue – Randall Wood	**The Oasis – Sally Fryer**; Not Quite Hollywood – Jamie Blanks, Sara Edwards, Mark Hartley; Rare Chicken Rescue – Scott Walton; The Siege – Stewart Young ASE
Best Sound in a Documentary	Best Short Fiction Film
**Rare Chicken Rescue – Brett Aplin, Greg Docwra, John Willsteed, David White**; Fairweather Man – Ben Crane, Michael Gissing, Guy Gross, Mike Jones; The Oasis – Felicity Fox, Michael Gissing; The Siege – Ian McLoughlin, Antony Partos, David White	**Jerrycan – Stuart Parkyn, Julius Avery**; fOUR – Zyra McAuliffe, Erin White; My Rabit Hoppy – Anthony Lucas; The Ground Beneath – Kristina Ceyton, Rene Hernandez
Best Short Animation	Best Screenplay in a Short Film
**Dog with Electric Collar – Steve Baker, Damon Escott**; Chainsaw – Fiona Cochrane, Dennis Tupicoff; Mutt – Beth Frey, Glen Hunwick; Paper City Architects – Daniel Agdag	**The Ground Beneath – Rene Hernandez**; 296 Smith Street – John Evagora; Chainsaw – Dennis Tupicoff; fOUR – Erin White

==== AFI Award for Outstanding Achievement in Short Film Screen Craft ====
- **Xanthe Highfield.** fOUR. For "Production Design"

=== Additional Awards ===
Australia Post Australia's Favourite Film Award	News Limited Readers' Choice Award
**The Castle**; Gallipoli; Lantana; Muriel's Wedding; The Adventures of Priscilla, Queen of The Desert	**Hugh Jackman**
Best Young Actor	Best Visual Effects
**Danielle Catanzariti – Hey, Hey, It's Esther Blueburger**; Saoirse Ronan – Death Defying Acts; Clarence John Ryan – September; Tom Green – The Ground Beneath	**H_{2}O: Just Add Water** **(Series 2) – Barry Lanfranchi**; Death Defying Acts – James Rogers; Double the Fist (Series 2) – Doug Bayne, Adam MacGowan, Michael Blake, Bill McGuire; Gabriel – Matthew Graham, Steve Anderson
International Award for Best Actor	International Award for Best Actress
**Heath Ledger – The Dark Knight**; Russell Crowe – American Gangster; Jack Thompson – Leatherheads; Eric Bana – The Other Boleyn Girl	**Cate Blanchett – Elizabeth: The Golden Age**; Rachel Griffiths – Brothers & Sisters; Nicole Kidman – The Golden Compass; Judy Davis – The Starter Wife

==== AFI International Award for Excellence in Filmmaking ====
- **Peter James ACS ASC.** For "Cinematography"

=== Individual Awards ===
Award	Winner	Production
Byron Kennedy Award	**Chris Lilley**	Summer Heights High
Raymond Longford Award	**Dione Gilmour**	-
AFI Documentary Trailblazer	**Mark Hartley**	Not Quite Hollywood
AFI Fellowship	**John L. Simpson**	-

== Multiple nominations ==
=== Films ===
- 11 nominations: The Black Balloon
- 10 nominations: Unfinished Sky
- 7 nominations: The Jammed & The Square

=== Television ===
- 8 nominations: Underbelly
- 6 nominations: East West 101
- 3 nominations: Summer Heights High, The Hollowmen & H_{2}O: Just Add Water
- 2 nominations: The Librarians & Rush

== Controversies and comments ==
=== AFI website "contenders" ===
On the website of the Australian Film Institute, it listed 25 expected nominees for the Best Film category. The 25 contenders were:

All My Friends Are Leaving Brisbane; Bitter and Twisted; Black Water; Cactus; Children of the Silk Road	Death Defying Acts; Five Moments of Infidelity; Gabriel; Green Fire Envy; Hey, Hey, It's Esther Blueburger	Men's Group; Punishment; Rats and Cats; Salvation; September	Ten Empty; The Black Balloon; The Independent; The Jammed; The Plex	The Square; The Tender Hook; The Tragedy of Hamlet Prince of Denmark; Three Blind Mice; Unfinished Sky
