= Jimmy The Exploder =

Entertainer

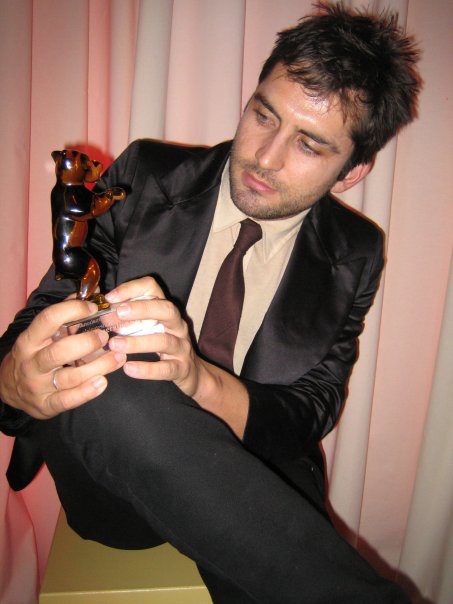
- Born: Daniel James Houghton; 1978 (age 47–48)
- Occupations: Filmmaker, Writer
- Years active: 2001-present
- Notable work: The Black Balloon
- Website: jimmytheexploder.com

Daniel James Houghton (born 1978), known professionally as "Jimmy The Exploder" or "The Exploder", is an Australian filmmaker and writer best known for the 2008 film The Black Balloon.

== Early life ==
The Exploder was born in Melbourne, Victoria. He grew up in Perth, Western Australia and was educated at the University of Western Australia.

== Short films ==
The Exploder (credited at the time as Jimmy Jack) began his career acting-in, writing and producing short films in Perth, Western Australia. Under the banner of Placebo Pictures he and director Elissa Down collaborated on the award-winning shorts HMAS Unicorn, Pink Pajamas, The Bathers and The Cherry Orchard. The Exploder also produced a Screenwest-funded short Phaid with director Christopher Frey which won Best Film at the Dubrovnik Film Festival and the Jury Award at the Winnipeg International Film Festival.

== The Black Balloon ==
The Exploder wrote and co-produced the Australian feature film The Black Balloon directed and co-written by Elissa Down. The duo recruited Strictly Ballroom producer Tristram Miall as head producer. The narrative is semi-autobiographical, mostly drawn from Down's childhood experiences, but she asked The Exploder to join her in writing the screenplay.

The Exploder and Down won Best Original Screenplay for the script at the 2008 Australian Film Institute Awards. The Exploder caused a minor controversy when, accepting his award, he read out a negative review of the film and uttered an expletive to the critic, for which he received a standing ovation. The film picked up a total of six awards including Best Film.

The Exploder also shared with Down the 2007 Western Australian Premier's Book Award and the 2008 Australian Writer's Guild AWGIE Award for the screenplay.

== Other film work ==
In 2009 it was reported that model Gemma Ward (who acted in The Black Balloon) would be starring in The Exploder's next feature film Sex, Brains & Rock 'n' Roll. He described it as a 'zombie rockumentary' and told reporters that he was looking at Macaulay Culkin to play the other lead role. The film is yet to be made.

According to IMDB, The Exploder directed and produced a yet-to-be-released Smashing Pumpkins documentary titled The Arising and is developing a feature film called Luka Magic.

== Writing ==
The Exploder has contributed to publications including The Guardian. His more notable publications have been social commentary on his hometown of Perth, and an obituary for his friend artist Matt Doust.

== Exhibition work and distribution company ==
In 2010 The Exploder curated the John Hughes Retrospective at the Northbridge Piazza, funded by the City of Perth.

In 2013 The Exploder founded the film sales and distribution company Video Archives. The company was named after the video store Quentin Tarantino worked at in Los Angeles before his career took off.

The Exploder was one of the founders of the Perth Underground Film Festival (PUFF) which was part of the Perth Fringe Festival in 2015.

== Henry Saw and the Museum of Perth ==
In 2015 The Exploder worked together with a group of prominent Western Australians to found the Museum of Perth. The Exploder owned Henry Saw cafe which was neighbours with the museum and named after the grocer who first roasted coffee beans in Perth.

== Controversy ==
In December 2018 The Exploder (under his birth name Daniel Houghton) appeared in Perth Magistrates Court on various charges related to a domestic incident with his then 21-year-old girlfriend, for which The Exploder was later convicted. He was also convicted in a district court on another count related to the same incident. In March 2019, Judge Ronald Birmingham issued a fully suspended custodial sentence to The Exploder. However, he was issued with a lifetime restraining order and fined a total of $5000. The particulars of the event were that The Exploder refused to let the woman leave for 20 minutes and during that time grabbed her by the arms and threw her bag against a wall.

== In popular culture ==
The Exploder was allegedly spoofed by Australian filmmakers Henry and Aaron in Henry & Aaron's 7 Steps to Superstardom, The Ballad of Danny Danielson and Henry & Aaron’s ABC2 Xmas Quickie. Their main character Danny "The Dynamite" Danielson was based on The Exploder, and their experiences working with him. Perth actor James Helm plays Danny Danielson.
