= Pete Smith (actor) =

New Zealand actor (1958–2022)

- Born: 7 August 1958; Kaitaia, New Zealand
- Died: 29 January 2022 (aged 63); Kaitaia, New Zealand
- Spouse: Mona Papali’i
- Children: 6

Peter Bruce Smith (7 August 1958 – 29 January 2022) was a New Zealand actor. He appeared in iconic New Zealand films such as The Quiet Earth (1985), The Piano (1993) and Once Were Warriors (1994), as well as working on well known television shows, including appearances on The Billy T James Show (1990) and Shortland Street in 1999.

== Career ==
At the outset of his career, Smith joined a drama course run by Māori film maker Don Selwyn, and soon thereafter performed in several of Selwyn's theatre productions, among them The Gospel according to Taane (1985), The Maori Merchant of Venice (2002) and Te Whai Ao.

Smith made his screen debut with a GOFTA-winning role as Api, one of the last people on Earth, in the apocalyptic science fiction film The Quiet Earth (1985).

His film credits include many notable New Zealand films, among them The Piano (1993), Once Were Warriors (1995), and the latter's sequel What Becomes of the Broken Hearted (1999). He also featured as an orc in Peter Jackson's The Lord of the Rings: The Return of the King (2003). Additionally, he appeared in the Australian film The Boys in 1998.

Smith also appeared in several television programmes, including E Tipu E Rea (1989), Marlin Bay (1992–94), Plainclothes (1995), Shortland Street (1999), Greenstone (1999), and Mataku (2001–04). He also starred in the drama series The Market (2005), for which he received an award for Best Performance by a supporting Actor at the Air New Zealand Screen Awards.

He performed in comedy skits and sketches in The Billy T James Show (1990) and current events satires Issues and More Issues (1991). Smith has also featured in and narrated several commercials and documentaries.

Smith created, presented, narrated, and directed several episodes of various documentary series, among them Nga Waiata o Te Hiku o Te Ika: Songs of the North (2002) and Maramataka: Once Were Gardeners (2007). The latter, a 13-part series screened on Māori Television, was a look at modern Māori relationships with the land.

== Personal life and death ==
Smith died from kidney disease on 29 January 2022, at the age of 63.

== Awards ==
Smith won best supporting actor in New Zealand drama feature film Flight of the Albatross (1995).

In 2006, he won Best Performance by a Supporting Actor at the Air New Zealand Screen Awards for his role in The Market.

== Selected filmography ==
=== Film ===
Film	Year	Role
The Quiet Earth	1985	Api
Pandemonium	1987	Peter Kong
Candy Regentag	1989	Clayton
Angel in Green	1987	Ramon
Crush	1992	Horse
The Piano	1993	Hone
Rapa-Nui	1994	Priest
Once Were Warriors	1994	Dooleys
Flight of the Albatross	1995	Huka
The Boys	1997	Abbo
What Becomes of the Broken Hearted	1999	Apeman
The Legend of Johnny Lingo	2002	Scary Chief
The Lord of the Rings: The Return of the King	2003	Hero Orc
Spooked	2004	Truck Driver
Hugh and Heke	2006	Heke
The Tattooist	2006	Taxi Driver
The One Armed Bandit	2012	Bill the barman

=== Television ===
Title	Year	Role
Heroes	1986	Churchill
E tipu e rea: Eel	1989	Tom
Raider of the South Seas	1991	George
The Billy T James Show	1990	Guest
Opo	1991	Dan
Gold	1991	Pita
Issues	1991	Skits
More Issues	1991–1992	Skit Guest
Marlin Bay	1992–1994	Matiu Burrows
The New Adventures of the Black Stallion	1992	Park Ranger
Maori Myths and Legends	1993	Presenter
High Tide	1995	Mexican
Plainclothes	1995	Oscar Kingi
Letter to Blanchy	1995	Guest Lead
Murder, They Said	1996	David Tamihere
Hei Konei Ra	1998	Lead
Greenstone	1999	Wahana
Shortland Street	1999	Te Hamua
Mataku	2001	Pahi
Spin Doctors	2001	Dunn
Mataku	2004	Ngamanu
The Market	2005	Chris Johnstone

=== Theatre ===
Play	Year	Role
The Gospel According to Taane	1985	Tu
Treat it Right	-	Pita
Murder in the Cathedral	-	3rd Tempter
The Maori Merchant of Venice	2002	Shylock
Te Whai Ao	-	
