= The Sugar Factory (film) =

- Directed by: Robert Carter
- Starring: Matt Day; Rhondda Findleton
- Release date: 1999
- Country: Australia
- Language: English
- Box office: A$11,109 (Australia)

The Sugar Factory is a 1999 Australian film directed by Robert Carter and starring Matt Day and Rhondda Findleton.

== Cast ==
- Matt Day as Harris
- Rhondda Findleton as Helen McMillan
- Marshall Napier as Mr Berne
- Sam Healy as Stephanie
- Nicholas Bishop as Mitchell Lawrence
- Felicity Price as Jacqueline
