= Rhondda Findleton =

Australian actress

- Born: Sydney, New South Wales, Australia
- Occupation: Actress
- Years active: 1988–present

Rhondda Findleton is a New Zealand actress largely based in Australia. She has had major roles in Plainclothes, Grass Roots, The Sugar Factory telemovie Temptation and its spinoff series The Cooks.

== Awards ==
Findleton has twice been nominated for Australian Film Institute Awards. In 2000, she was nominated for Best Performance by an Actress in a Leading Role in a Television Drama Series for her appearance in the Grass Roots episode "Late July 4.00pm to 10.30pm". In 2001, she was nominated for Best Actress in a Guest Role in a Television Drama Series for her appearance in the Stingers episode "Fool To Want You".

== Filmography ==
=== Film ===
Year	Title	Role	Notes
1988	Prejudice	Caroline	TV movie
1988	Action Replay		TV movie
1989	How Wonderful!	Jen	TV movie
1989	More Winners: Mr Edmund	Margaret	TV movie
1990	Harbour Beat	Carol Walker	Feature film
1993	Love in Limbo	Gwen Riddle	Feature film
1993	No Worries	Maggie Gregg	
1993	Avondale Dogs	Paul's Mum	Short film
1998	The Laundry	Woman	Short film
1998	The Sugar Factory	Helen McMillan	Feature film
1999	Chameleon II: Death Match	Eva	TV movie
1999	Secret Men's Business	Mrs Healey	TV movie
2002	The Hard Word	Jane	Feature film
2003	Temptation	Rita Molloy	TV movie
2006	BlackJack: At the Gates	Jane Harrison	TV movie
2006	Look Sharp	Jo	Short film
2007	Skin		Short film
2008	Dream Life	Aunty Vivian	TV movie
2010	At the Tattooist	Aunt Ros	Short film
2010	Wasted on the Young	Cassandra	Feature film
2011	Blood Brothers		TV movie
2021	The Greenhouse	Lillian Tweedy-Bell	

=== Television ===
Year	Title	Role	Notes
1987–93	A Country Practice	Various characters	TV series, 6 episodes
1988	Rafferty's Rules	Sue Gibson	TV series, 4episodes
1988	Home and Away	Various roles	TV series, 2 episodes
1991	G.P.	Jenny Mitcham	TV series, 1 episode
1991	Inspector Morse	Anne Harding	TV series, 1 episode
1993	The Leaving of Liverpool	Lorna	TV series
1995	Plainclothes	DS George Samuels	TV series
1995	Echo Point	Robin Ollie	TV series, 2 episodes
1997	Big Sky	Shelly Martin	TV series, 1 episode
1997	State Coroner	Anne Wilmont	TV series, 1 episode
1997	Wildside	Tracey Malleson	TV series, 3 episodes
1998	Murder Call	Freda Holland	TV series, season 2, episode 12: Something Fishy
1998–2001	Stingers	Various roles	TV series, 2 episodes
1999–2007	All Saints	Various roles	TV series, 2 episodes
2001	Halifax f.p.	Grace Lord	TV series, 1 episode
2002	Bootleg	Carol Hunter	TV series, 3 episodes
2000–03	Grass Roots	Karin Schumaker	TV series, 18 episodes
2003	MDA	Clara Shields	TV series, 1 episode
2004–05	The Cooks	Rita Molloy	TV series, 13 episodes
2006	Nightmares & Dreamscapes: From the Stories of Stephen King	Sarah Joyce	TV miniseries
2006–07	Love My Way	Tess Delaney	TV series, 6 episodes
2010	City Homicide	Francesca Hayward	TV series, 1 episode
2011	East West 101	Rhonda Hunter	TV series, 1 episode
2011	Crownies	Claudia Swann	TV series, 1 episode
2012	Rake	Dr Fisher	TV series, 1 episode
2014	ANZAC Girls	Matron Ellen Gould	TV series, 3 episodes
2015	Hiding	Principal Barker	TV series, 3 episodes
2016	Wolf Creek	Deborah Larsson	TV series, 1 episode
2016	Cleverman	Frankie	TV series, 5 episodes
2019	Secret City	Madeline Stenders	TV series, 4 episodes
2022	The Twelve	Gabby	TV series, 5 episodes
