= Angel in Green =

- Written by: Michael Patrick Goodman
- Directed by: Marvin J. Chomsky
- Starring: Susan Dey; Bruce Boxleitner
- Music by: Allyn Ferguson
- Countries of origin: United States; New Zealand
- Original language: English

Production
- Producer: Harry R. Sherman
- Cinematography: James Bartle
- Editor: Howard Kunin
- Running time: 96 min

Original release
- Network: CBS
- Release: September 22, 1987

Angel in Green is a 1987 USA-New Zealand TV film. It stars Bruce Boxleitner and Susan Dey and was filmed in Rarotonga.

On a remote South Seas island a group of rebels attack a village, leaving Sister Ann to run her mission. She calls for help and a group of Special Force fighters, led by Captain Wicker, arrive to train the villagers to defend themselves. A romance develops between the two.

== Cast ==
- Bruce Boxleitner as Captain William Wicker
- Susan Dey as Sister Ann McKeon
- Milo O'Shea as Father Mahon
- Pete Smith as Ramon
- Dan Lauria as Sergeant Joe Kobalzki
- Bobby Hosea as Rhodes
- Michael Novak as McCoy
- José Santana as Rodriguez
- Rick Adams as Wentworth

== Reception ==
Don Shirley of the Los Angeles Times used a quote from the movie to sum it up, "Stupid, but interesting" and he says "one wonders if Michael Patrick Goodman wrote this pack of cliches as a gag." Jerry Krupnick panned the predictable nature of film in the Star-Ledger and said "The strange thing is that this obvious flick has a good cast and was directed by a true TV veteran, Marvin Chomsky". The Columbia Record's Ray Benson called it a solid movie that had a "pretty good script". Critic Peter Malone called it "a routine action telemovie." Kay Gardella's capsual review in Daily News called it a "so-so, watch-it-if-you want-to, harmless entry". Noel Taylor's capsual review in Daily News says "Angel In Green just plain embarrasses."
