= Erik Thomson =

Australian actor

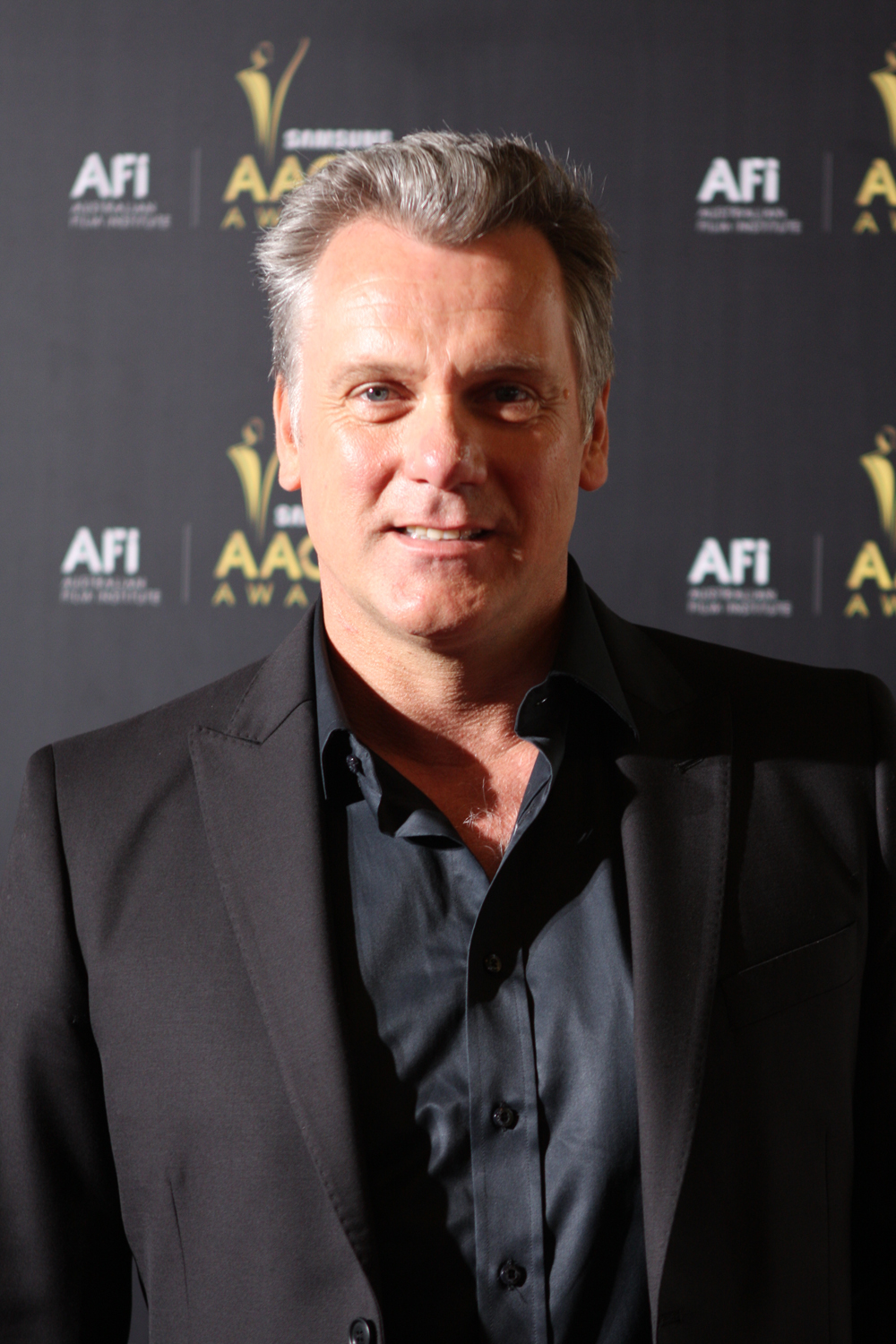
- Born: 27 April 1967 (age 59); Inverness, Scotland
- Citizenship: United Kingdom; New Zealand; Australia
- Occupation: Actor
- Years active: 1990−present
- Known for: Packed to the Rafters; Back to the Rafters; All Saints

Erik Thomson is a Scottish-New Zealand-Australian actor. He played Hades in the television series Hercules: The Legendary Journeys, Xena Warrior Princess, and Young Hercules, Dr. Mitch Stevens in All Saints and Dave Rafter in Packed to the Rafters.

Thomson has been nominated for many awards, and won a few, including an Australian Film Institute Award for his performance in the Australian feature film Somersault in 2004.

== Early life ==
Erik Thomson was born c. 1967 in Inverness, Scotland. His grandmother was from the Shetland Islands, and he would stay there every summer, often accompanying his fishermen grandfather and uncles on their fishing boats. He sometimes ate whale that was brought by Norwegian and Russian whalers in exchange for mutton prepared by his grandmother. His family emigrated to New Zealand when he was seven, settling first in Tauranga.

The family moved to Upper Hutt, near Wellington. While at high school, he played rugby, and also played in a band with Tim Balme, performing songs by The Clash and various artists on the NZ Flying Nun label.

He first studied English literature and drama at Victoria University of Wellington, but he switched to studyimf performing arts at the New Zealand Drama School before graduating; he graduated from the New Zealand Drama School in 1990. He has said "All my memories of my childhood and my early adult life are in New Zealand", and he regards the country as his "spiritual home".

Thomson holds triple British, New Zealand and Australian citizenship.

== Career ==
Thomson had a number of television roles in New Zealand, starting with Marlin Bay, a drama set in a casino and resort. He won a wider fan following for his occasional appearances as the god Hades in the series Hercules: The Legendary Journeys, Xena: Warrior Princess and Young Hercules, all three series of which were filmed in New Zealand.

In 1995, Thomson moved to Australia and landed regular roles in Pacific Drive, medical series All Saints (1999–2003) and The Alice (2005). He has had guest roles on such series as Wildside and Always Greener. From 2008 to 2013, Thomson played Dave Rafter on the Seven Network dramedy series Packed to the Rafters. From 2015 to 2018 he had the lead role in 800 Words.

Thomson's work in theatre includes roles in Complete Works of Shakespeare, Julius Caesar, Twelve Angry Men, and Angels in America.

Thomson's film credits include the role of soldier Simon Mollison in the 2008 film The Black Balloon with Rhys Wakefield, Luke Ford, Toni Collette and Gemma Ward. He appeared in Somersault with Abbie Cornish and Sam Worthington, which scored him an AFI Award. He also featured in Accidents Happen with Geena Davis, Storm Boy with Geoffrey Rush, and Finn Little, and Blueback with Mia Wasikowska and Radha Mitchell.

In 2023, Thomson appeared in channel 7 series The Claremont Murders.

In 2024 Thomson was named in the cast for Kangaroo Island. On 21 October 2024, Thomson was announced to play Scrooge for the 2024 theatre season of A Christmas Carol.

== Awards ==
Thomson won an Australian Film Institute Award for Best Actor in a Supporting Role for his performance in Somersault, and was nominated for his work in The Black Balloon. For television, he has been nominated for a Logie Award five times and has won two Silver Logie for Most Popular Actor.

Organizations	Year (Note: Indicates the year of the ceremony.)	Category	Work	Result
Logie Awards	2002	Silver Logie for Most Popular Actor	All Saints	Nominated
Logie Awards	2003	Silver Logie for Most Popular Actor	All Saints	Won
Logie Awards	2004	Silver Logie for Most Popular Actor	All Saints	Nominated
Logie Awards	2009	Silver Logie for Most Popular Actor	Packed to the Rafters	Nominated
Logie Awards	2010	Silver Logie for Most Popular Actor	Packed to the Rafters	Nominated
Logie Awards	2016	Silver Logie for Most Popular Actor	800 Words	Won
Logie Awards	2017	Silver Logie for Most Popular Actor	800 Words	Nominated
Logie Awards	2018	Silver Logie for Most Popular Actor	800 Words	Nominated
AFI Awards	2004	AFI Award for Best Actor in a Supporting Role	Somersault	Won
AFI Awards	2008	AFI Award for Best Actor in a Supporting Role	The Black Balloon	Nominated

(The Silver Logie for Most Popular Actor was referred to as "Best Actor" in 2016 and 2017)

== Filmography ==
=== Film ===
Year	Title	Role	Notes
1998	13 Gantry Row	Kieron	TV movie
2004	Somersault	Richard	Feature film
2006	BlackJack: Dead Memory	Rob	TV movie
2007	We're Here to Help	Dave Henderson	Feature film
2008	The Black Balloon	Simon Mollison	Feature film
2009	The Boys Are Back	Digby	Feature film
2009	Beautiful	Frank	Feature film
2009	Accidents Happen	Bob	Feature film
2013	The Broken Shore	Steve Villani	TV movie
2015	Now Add Honey	Richard Morgan	Feature film
2018	Storm Boy	Malcom Downer	Feature film
2019	Awoken	Robert	Feature film
2021	Coming Home in the Dark	Hoaggie	Feature film
2022	Blueback	Costello	Feature film
2022	Monolith	Voice	Feature film
2024	Kangaroo Island	Rory Wells	

=== Television ===
Year	Title	Role	Notes
1992-94	Marlin Bay		TV series
1992	The Ray Bradbury Theater	Young Man	TV series
1995	Plainclothes	PC James Rose	TV series
1995	The Enid Blyton Adventure Series	Joe	TV series
1995-99	Hercules: The Legendary Journeys	Hades	TV series
1995–98	Xena: Warrior Princess	Hades	TV series
1996-97	Pacific Drive	Brett Barrett	TV series
1998-99	Young Hercules	Hades	TV series
1997-99	Wildside	Guest role	TV series
2001-03	Always Greener	Guest role	TV series
1999-03	All Saints	Dr. Mitchell Stevens	TV series
2001	Justin Brown	Justin Brown	
2004	Through My Eyes	Professor James Cameron	TV miniseries
2005	MDA	David Simpson	TV series
2005–06	The Alice	Jack Jaffers	TV series
2008–13	Packed to the Rafters	Dave Rafter	TV series
2014	The Code	Niko Gaelle	TV series
2015–18	800 Words	George Turner	TV series
2020	The Luminaries	Dick Mannering	TV miniseries
2021-22	Aftertaste	Easton West	TV series, 12 episodes
2021	Back to the Rafters	Dave Rafter	TV series, 6 episodes
2022	Black Snow	Steve Walcott	TV series, 6 episodes
2023	The Claremont Murders	Don Spiers	TV miniseries, 2 episodes
2023	C*A*U*G*H*T	Colonel Bishop	6 episodes
2024	My Life Is Murder	Lawrence	1 episode
2024	Critical Incident	Trevor Latt	6 episodes
2026	My Brilliant Career	Theodore Hardwicke	TV series
