= Plainclothes (TV series) =

- Created by: Maureen Sinton; Ray Van Beynen
- Written by: Nick Malmholt; Mark Beesly; Judy Callingham; James Griffin; Liddy Holloway; Rachel Lang
- Directed by: Chris Bailey; John Laing; Wayne Tourell; Brian McDuffie; Steve Mann
- Starring: Rhondda Findleton; Sean Duffy; Alan Dale
- Country of origin: New Zealand
- Original language: English
- No. of seasons: 1
- No. of episodes: 26

Production
- Executive producer: John Barnett
- Producers: Maureen Sinton; Tim Sanders
- Cinematography: Michael O'Connor
- Editor: Nick Malmholt
- Running time: 45 minutes

Original release
- Release: 15 March – 6 September 1995

Plainclothes is a New Zealand police drama television series. It ran from March until September 1995. It performed well in the ratings, averaging over 430,000 viewers. It was axed after one season.

== Synopsis ==
Detective Sergeant Georgina "George" Samuels leads a team of plainclothes police officers while having to deal with a sexist boss

== Cast ==
- Rhondda Findleton as DS Georgina Samuels
- Sean Duffy as Det LP Pitt
- Pete Smith as Det Oscar Kingi
- Erik Thomson as PC James Rose
- Gillian Baxter as PC Linda O'Connor
- Alan Dale as Sen Sgt Mitch Mitchell
- Shane Wong as DC Paddy Lim
- Carmel McGlone as Helena Mitchell
- Brenda Kendall as Lilly Thomas
- Dale Corlett as Noel Little
- Amber Sainsbury as Tessa Samuels

== Reception ==
Commenting on the first episode Phil Wakefield of the Evening Post gave it a mixed review saying "While tonight's premiere is as routine as police work itself, it shows promise in the performances, characterisations and dialogue." Also in the Evening Post Russell Mark gave it a mixed review commenting "But while the cast has been saddled with a substandard script, there is still plenty to recommend Plainclothes. The acting is top shelf and they've packed so many characters into the squadroom that there's plenty of potential for future programmes." He wrote of a later episode that the show "continues to go from weakness to weakness."
