= The Black Balloon (film) =

2008 film by Elissa Down

- Theatrical release poster
- Directed by: Elissa Down
- Written by: Elissa Down; Jimmy Jack
- Produced by: Tristram Miall
- Starring: Rhys Wakefield; Luke Ford; Toni Collette; Erik Thomson; Gemma Ward
- Cinematography: Denson Baker
- Edited by: Veronika Jenet
- Music by: Michael Yezerski
- Production company: Icon Entertainment International
- Distributed by: NeoClassics Films
- Release dates: 9 February 2008 (Berlin International Film Festival); 6 March 2008 (Australia)
- Running time: 97 minutes
- Country: Australia
- Language: English
- Budget: A$5 million
- Box office: $2.26 million

The Black Balloon is a 2008 Australian comedy-drama film starring Toni Collette, Rhys Wakefield, Luke Ford, Erik Thomson, Gemma Ward as well as a cast of newcomers. It is directed by first-time feature film director, Elissa Down.

The film was released in Australian cinemas on 6 March 2008. The world premiere was at the Berlin International Film Festival in Germany in February 2008, where the film received a Crystal Bear as the best feature-length film in the Generation 14plus category.

== Plot ==
Thomas Mollison (Rhys Wakefield) and his family move to a new home in the early 1990s. It begins with Charlie, his autistic brother, banging a wooden spoon on the grass with neighbours staring and pointing. Then, it cuts to the house where there are locks on the drawers and Maggie, their mother, locking star-shaped stickers in her bathroom cabinet. Thomas is anxious because he has to start at a new school, and make new friends. All he wants to do is fit in and be regarded in the same way as everyone else. However, it seems he struggles to achieve this goal. Although his family appears to be a fairly happy one, Thomas often feels isolated; it seems as if his mother only dotes upon his brother, Charlie (Luke Ford), and does not pay any attention to him. However, Thomas is devoted to his brother and shows affection for him. Charlie is Thomas's older brother who lives with severe autism, as well as ADD. Charlie enjoys dressing up like a monkey, playing computer games using a Commodore 64 and receiving gold stars for good behaviour. Charlie communicates with the rest of his family by using sign language.

When their heavily pregnant mother, Maggie (Toni Collette), must take a rest owing to a recommendation by her doctor as a consequence of Maggie's high blood pressure relating to her pre-eclampsia, Thomas is put in charge of Charlie. Thomas finds this task difficult and onerous. For example, when Charlie flees from the house in a high-spirited mood, Thomas runs after him to ensure the safety of his brother, but he cannot keep up with Charlie. Matters become even more problematic when Charlie expresses the urge to go to the bathroom and enters the nearest house to use the toilet. When he does so, the brothers encounter Jackie (Gemma Ward) who is taking a shower. The fact that both brothers are only wearing their underwear is a source of severe embarrassment for Thomas.

Jackie exhibits her interest in Thomas when she attends a CPR class at school and visits Thomas at his home to return Charlie's monkey hat that he accidentally left behind when he used Jackie's toilet. Thomas's first response is to ensure that his brother is hidden away from Jackie. However, Maggie is less than thrilled when she discovers that Thomas has locked Charlie in his bedroom. She then sees Charlie proceeding to rub his own faeces into the carpet. After Maggie attempts to clean up the floor, (despite being ordered to stay in bed) Thomas becomes frustrated and tells Maggie that Charlie is her responsibility and she slaps him after he calls him a freak. Maggie replies that Charlie will never be able to have a job, nor a family and he will be unable to look after himself. He will be more likely to remain living with his parents for the rest of his life.

This latest episode proves too much for Maggie. Her husband, Simon, insists that she spend the rest of her pregnancy in the hospital instead, leaving Thomas to become the primary caregiver for Charlie. Thomas begins to enter into Charlie's world when he rides the school bus for children with various special needs with his brother. In addition, Thomas is seen dealing with Charlie, who has a meltdown due to Simon not buying some more items at a local supermarket since he does not have enough money. This again causes severe embarrassment for Thomas. That same evening when the trio return from the supermarket, Thomas, who was annoyed by the meltdown, rips up Charlie's star chart. This causes things to become worse when the brothers fight and Charlie throws a stool through the window. The next day, when Thomas attends his swimming class, Jackie wears Charlie's monkey ears, which pleases and amuses him. When Jackie meets Charlie, she makes a concerted effort to know and understand him, as well as to use Sign Language as a means by which to communicate with him.

Thomas and his father both endeavour to care for Charlie together. Simon tells Thomas that his mother is grateful to have Charlie as a child because she feels that the family is strong enough to be able to look after him. Representatives from Youth and Community Services visit the house and state that they have received multiple complaints about Charlie. Simon is furious at his neighbour whom he attributes responsibility for the invasive visit. Thomas also displays his loyalty to his brother. Charlie accompanies Jackie and Thomas to swim in a river. When it rains, they all shelter in a nearby drainpipe where Jackie and Thomas share their first kiss. When the boys arrive home, there is a note taped to the television which states that Maggie has given birth to a girl.

When Thomas sees Charlie at his school after his school bus parks up on the same road, Charlie becomes the victim of malicious taunting and harassment. Jackie tells Thomas that he needs to quit wishing that Charlie was "normal." Tensions flare when Jackie eats a roast dinner with the family in order to celebrate Thomas's sixteenth birthday. Jackie wonders whether or not Charlie will ever speak again. Thomas is confident that Charlie will if everyone will stop communicating with him using Sign Language. After Thomas blows out the candles on his cake, Charlie begins masturbating at the table, causing Jackie to become extremely uncomfortable. The cake gets accidentally toppled over whilst this is happening. In response, Thomas becomes irate and in anger, smashes Charlie's Super NES console (which Charlie had earned for getting enough stars on his good behavior chart earlier), leading to a fight between the brothers. After a frightening physical altercation between the two brothers with Charlie getting his forehead stitched up at the ER, Maggie exhibits sympathy for both of her sons. In spite of his mother's commiseration, Thomas still feels as if he behaved badly, and goes outside to reflect on his actions from earlier while Jackie comforts him by kissing his forearm, indicating she loves him nonetheless. While walking back home, Thomas sees Charlie emerging out of a car grinning and giving him a double thumbs up, he smiles back at his brother in response. In the following morning, Thomas joins Charlie in his morning activity: sitting in the backyard while banging a wooden spoon on the ground. He then learns how to drive with his dad, and picks up an ecstatic Jackie with his new car.

The family and Jackie attend a musical production in Charlie's special school entitled "Animals Afloat", (a musical based on Noah's Ark) in which he portrays a monkey. After Charlie's theatrical partner, Russell, has a meltdown on stage and has a falling out with Charlie backstage, Thomas decides to fill in for Russell so that Charlie doesn't have to go on stage alone, and the brothers both don monkey costumes and give an outstanding performance. The brothers celebrate their success by taking a bubble bath together. Thomas confesses to his brother that when he was little, he used to fall asleep at night, wishing that Charlie would be normal. Charlie looks thoughtful. The film concludes with Thomas laughing and asking Charlie, "You just pissed on my leg, didn't you?" The brothers then share a laugh together.

== Cast ==
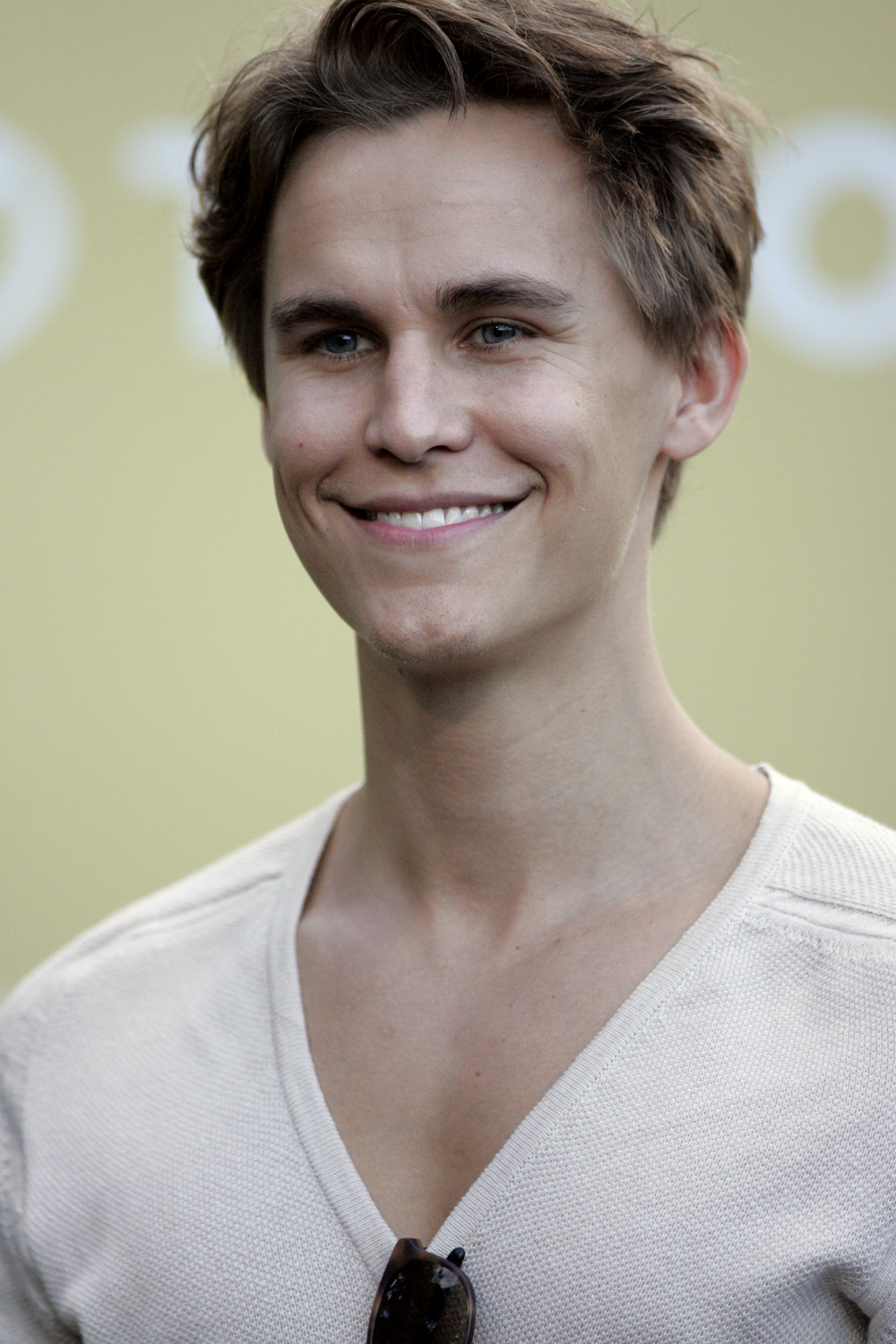
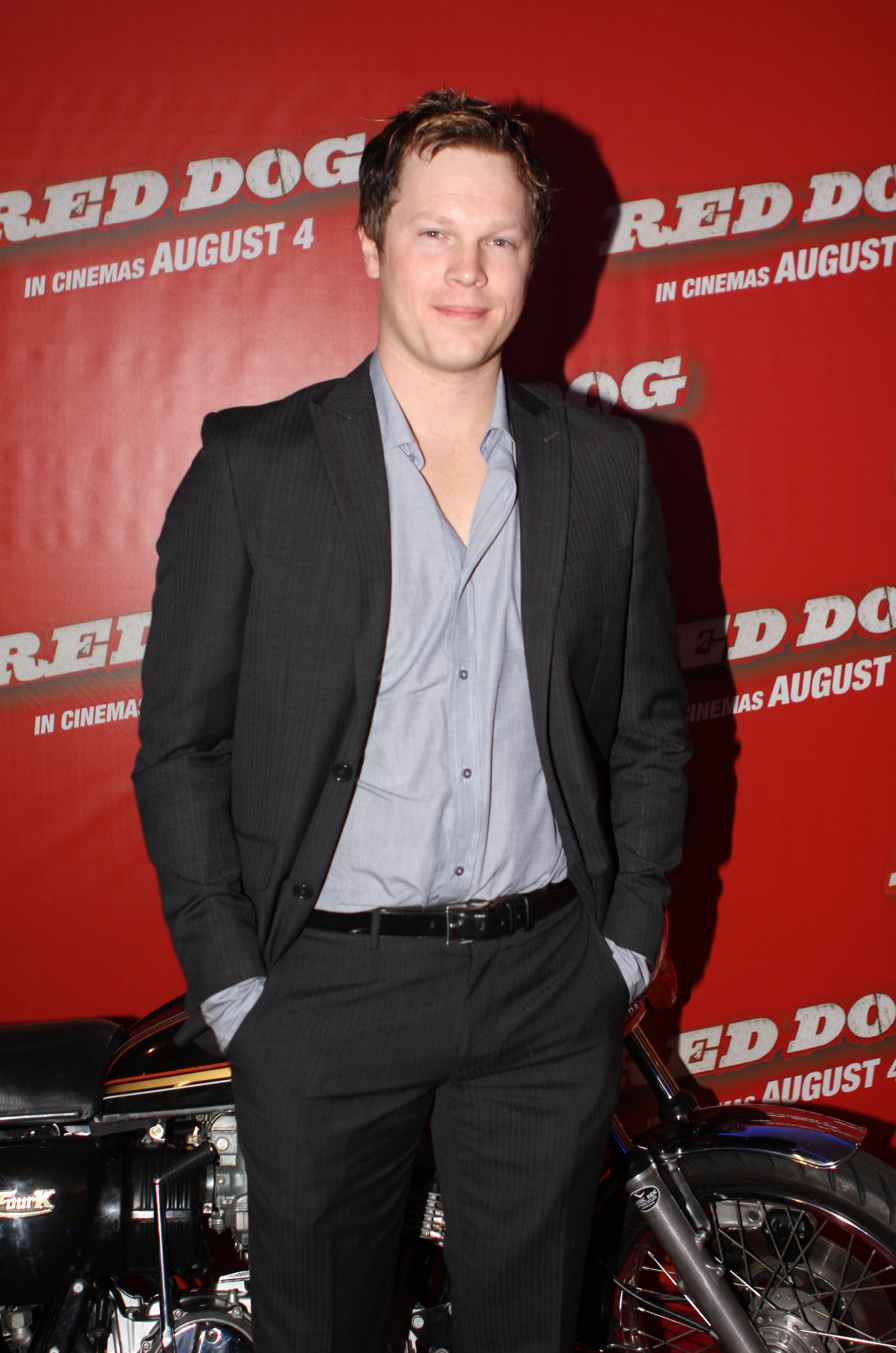
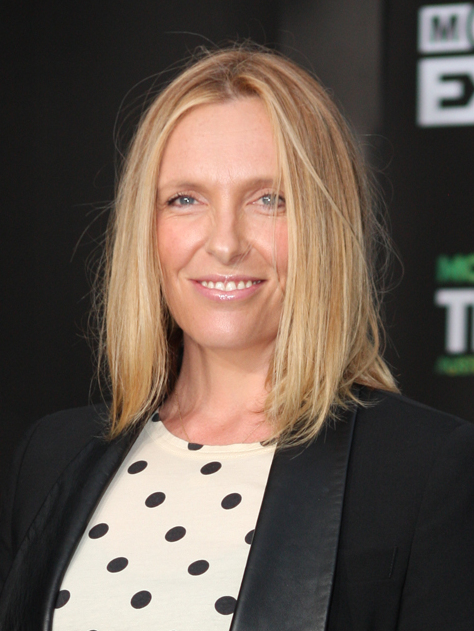
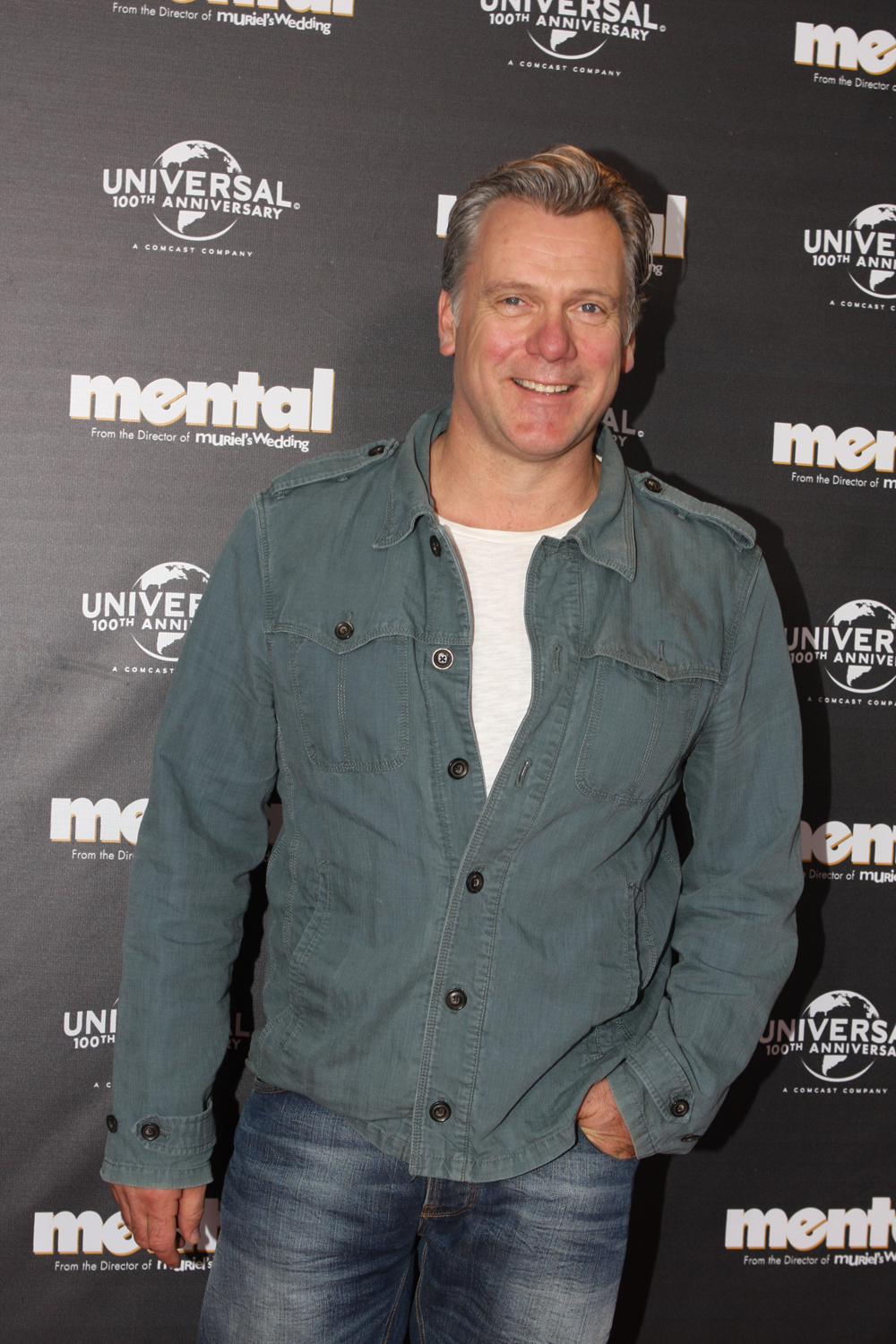
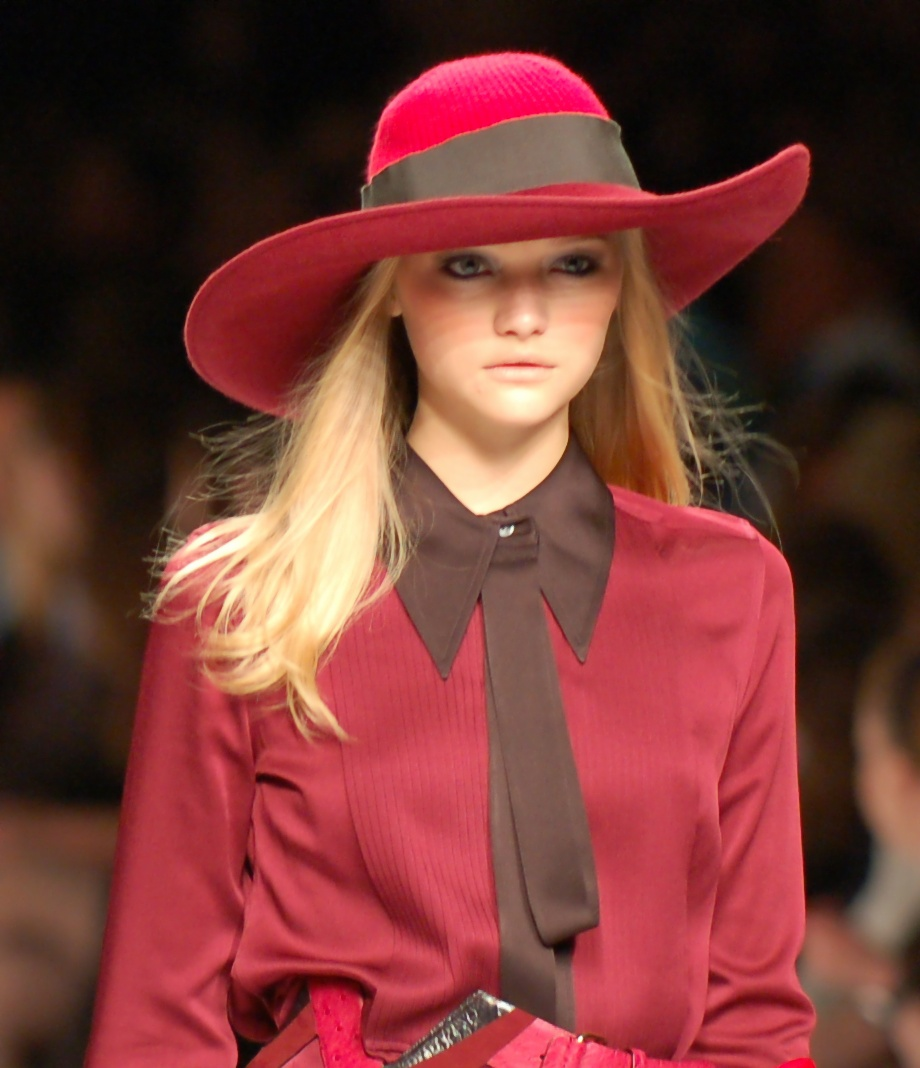
(Left to right) Rhys Wakefield (pictured in 2013), Luke Ford (2011), Toni Collette (2012), Erik Thomson (2012) and Gemma Ward (2007)
- Rhys Wakefield as Thomas Mollison
- Luke Ford as Charlie Mollison
- Toni Collette as Maggie Mollison
- Erik Thomson as Simon Mollison
- Gemma Ward as Jackie Masters
- Lloyd Allison-Young as James
- Nathin Butler as Chris
- Lisa Kowalski as Sally
- Firass Dirani as Russell
- Sarah Woods as Janet
- Kieran Smith as Elephant No. 2
- Ryan Clark as Dean

The Animals Afloat! segment was cast from a group of teens and young adults whose lives are affected by autism and Asperger's Syndrome. Some of the Afloat! cast have high-functioning autism themselves, others were their siblings. This reflected the "two by two" nature of the Noah's Ark theme as well as continued the theme of siblings working together and loving one another.

== Reception ==
The Black Balloon was reviewed on At the Movies, with Margaret Pomeranz, giving it four out of five stars, hailing it as 'such a strong film.' She praised the acting of the principal cast, saying that the 'role of Thomas is a knife-edge one, it could so easily be made unsympathetic, but Rhys Wakefield makes us empathise with Thomas's agonies, and Luke Ford makes Charlie both loveable and exasperating, another big achievement. But towering over the film is the performance of Toni Collette, she is just so good in every role she takes on, and Erik Thomson gives solid support as Simon. Model turned actress Gemma Ward steps up to the plate. ... It's a very auspicious debut' for director Elissa Down. Co-presenter David Stratton agreed, giving the film four-and-a-half stars, and added that 'it's so beautifully played. ... Gemma Ward is wonderful too. ... [Her character] Jackie's such a generous, sympathetic person who embraces her boyfriend's brother as well as the boyfriend.'

Roger Ebert felt that the film's strengths lay in the structure of the piece as well as its central characters and casting. ‘The Black Balloon establishes this family with a delicate mixture of tenderness and pain. … The story elements … could have been manipulated to make the film false and cute. … The uplift comes in how the family, and Jackie, respond to Charlie. Maggie and Simon are strongly bonded in a marriage that has survived Charlie. They have no time for nobility; they are focused on doing what needs to be done. … It is Jackie who turns out to be special. … Gemma Ward, who plays her, … creates a spontaneously warm young woman. … Luke Ford's performance as Charlie is a convincing tour de force. … Rhys Wakefield, in his first feature role, is a good casting decision, suggesting inner turmoil without overacting. But it is Toni Collette who explains, without even seeming to try, why this family is still together at all.'

Overall, the film received positive reviews. The first weekend of release saw The Black Balloon at number 10 on the Australian box office with an intake of $500,000. Rotten Tomatoes reported that, based on 42 reviews, 88% of them were positive.

== Awards ==
On 11 November 2008, The Black Balloon won the Best Children’s Feature Film award in the 2008 Asia Pacific Screen Awards. The award was accepted by Producer Tristram Miall and Director/Writer/Co-Producer Elissa Down.

Since then, The Black Balloon has received numerous awards (and nominations) in Australia and at Film Festivals around the world:

Award	Category	Subject	Result
AACTA Awards (2008 AFI Awards)	Best Film	Tristram Miall	Won
AACTA Awards (2008 AFI Awards)	Best Direction	Elissa Down	Won
AACTA Awards (2008 AFI Awards)	Best Original Screenplay	Elissa Down	Won
AACTA Awards (2008 AFI Awards)	Best Original Screenplay	Jimmy Jack	Won
AACTA Awards (2008 AFI Awards)	Best Actor	Rhys Wakefield	Nominated
AACTA Awards (2008 AFI Awards)	Best Supporting Actor	Luke Ford	Won
AACTA Awards (2008 AFI Awards)	Best Supporting Actor	Erik Thomson	Nominated
AACTA Awards (2008 AFI Awards)	Best Supporting Actress	Toni Collette	Won
AACTA Awards (2008 AFI Awards)	Best Cinematography	Denson Baker	Nominated
AACTA Awards (2008 AFI Awards)	Best Editing	Veronika Jenet	Won
AACTA Awards (2008 AFI Awards)	Best Original Music Score	Michael Yezerski	Nominated
AACTA Awards (2008 AFI Awards)	Best Sound	Ben Osmo	Nominated
AACTA Awards (2008 AFI Awards)	Best Sound	Paul Pirola	Nominated
Asia Pacific Screen Award	Best Children's Feature Film		Won
ADG Award	Best Direction in a Feature Film	Elissa Down	Won
ASE Award	Best Editing in a Feature Film	Veronika Jenet	Nominated
Berlin International Film Festival	Crystal Bear for Best Feature Film "Generation 14plus"	Elissa Down	Won
FCCA Awards	Best Film	Tristram Miall	Won
FCCA Awards	Best Director	Elissa Down	Won
FCCA Awards	Best Screenplay	Elissa Down	Nominated
FCCA Awards	Best Screenplay	Jimmy Jack	Nominated
FCCA Awards	Best Actor	Rhys Wakefield	Nominated
FCCA Awards	Best Actress	Gemma Ward	Nominated
FCCA Awards	Best Supporting Actor	Luke Ford	Nominated
FCCA Awards	Best Supporting Actress	Toni Collette	Won
FCCA Awards	Best Cinematography	Denson Baker	Nominated
FCCA Awards	Best Editing	Veronika Jenet	Nominated
FCCA Awards	Best Music Score	Michael Yezerski	Nominated
Hamptons International Film Festival	Distinguished Achievement Award for Best Female Feature Director	Elissa Down	Won
Inside Film Awards	Box Office Achievement		Won
Inside Film Awards	Best Feature Film	Tristram Miall	Nominated
Inside Film Awards	Best Feature Film	Elissa Down	Nominated
Inside Film Awards	Best Director	Elissa Down	Nominated
Inside Film Awards	Best Script	Elissa Down	Nominated
Inside Film Awards	Best Script	Jimmy Jack	Nominated
Inside Film Awards	Best Actor	Rhys Wakefield	Nominated
Inside Film Awards	Best Actress	Gemma Ward	Nominated
Inside Film Awards	Best Cinematography	Denson Baker	Nominated
Inside Film Awards	Best Editing	Veronika Jenet	Nominated
Inside Film Awards	Best Music	Michael Yezerski	Nominated
Inside Film Awards	Best Sound	Paul Pirola	Nominated
Inside Film Awards	Best Production Design	Nicholas McCallum	Nominated
Entertainment Industries Council	PRISM Award for Best Feature Film – Mental Health		Nominated
Screen Music Award	Best Soundtrack Album	Michael Yezerski	Won
Screen Music Award	Best Original Song ("When We Get There")	Michael Yezerski	Won
Screen Music Award	Best Original Song ("When We Get There")	Josh Pyke	Won

== Box office ==
The Black Balloon grossed $2,265,689 at the box office in Australia.

== Filming locations ==
Production wrapped up in 2007 (the year of its copyright notice) and filming took place in the Sydney area at the following locations:

- Holsworthy Public School
- Bardia Parade, Holsworthy
- University of Western Sydney Hawkesbury campus swimming pool
- Granville Performance Hall
- Wattamolla

== Soundtrack ==
1. "When We Get There" – Josh Pyke
2. "Even" – Simon Day (Ratcat)
3. "Heartbreak Hill" – Michael Yezerski
4. "The Black Balloon Theme" – Michael Yezerski
5. "Bath Time" / "Bullet Boy" – Michael Yezerski
6. "In The Poo" / "The Bus" – Michael Yezerski
7. "The Lolly" – Michael Yezerski
8. "A New Game" / "Water Babies" – Michael Yezerski
9. "Learning To Swim" – Michael Yezerski
10. "The Kiss" – Michael Yezerski
11. "The School Fight" – Michael Yezerski
12. "Fall at Your Feet" – Glenn Richards (Augie March)
13. "Aftermath" – Michael Yezerski
14. "The Walk Home" – Michael Yezerski
15. "The Greatest ACT in History" – David Campbell, Bert Labonte
16. "Afloat! The Conga" – Claire McCarthy, Miriam Rihani, Afro Moses

"Fall at Your Feet" is a rendition of the Neil Finn (Crowded House) song. The soundtrack won 'Best Original Soundtrack' at the 2008 APRA-AGSC Screen Music Awards for Michael Yezerski, with Josh Pyke winning 'Best Original Song' for "When We Get There", which he co-wrote with Yezerski. Songs also featuring in the film include "Better" by The Screaming Jets, "Don't Go Now" by Ratcat, "Streets of Your Town" by The Go Betweens, "Know You Know" by The Someloves and Jimmy Barnes' "Driving Wheels".

== See also ==
- List of fictional characters on the autistic spectrum
