= Elissa Down =

Australian filmmaker

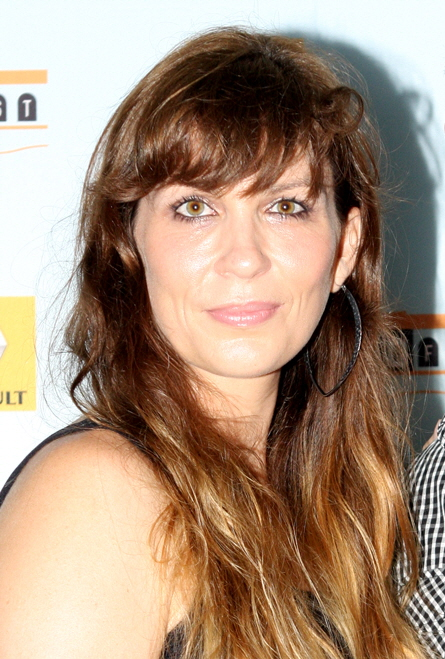
- Down at Flickerfest Short Film Festival opens at Bondi Pavilion, Bondi Beach, Sydney, Australia, 11 January 2011
- Known for: Filmmaker

Elissa Down is an Australian filmmaker, who in 1999 and 2000, was nominated for Young Film-maker of the year at the WA Screen Awards.

Her major works are a number of award-winning short films, Summer Angst, The Cherry Orchard, Her Outback, The Bathers, Pink Pyjamas, HMAS Unicorn and Samantha Stewart, aged fourteen. They have been screened at numerous festivals including Tampere, Locarno Aix-en-Provence, Montecatini, Milan, San Francisco Indie, St Kilda, Brisbane, Revelation, Women on Women, POV and Tropfest. These shorts have also been screened in theatres and broadcast nationally and overseas. Down was one of Australia's upcoming artists featured in the In Progress spread in Vogue (2005).

Down's first feature film, the semi-autobiographical, The Black Balloon was released in Australian cinemas 6 March 2008. It stars Rhys Wakefield, Gemma Ward, Luke Ford, Erik Thomson and Academy Award Nominee Toni Collette. The film was partially based on herself and family. It was produced by Tristram Miall and co-written by Jimmy The Exploder. The world premiere was at the Berlin International Film Festival in Germany in February 2008, where the film received a Crystal Bear as the best feature-length film in the Generation 14plus category. On 6 December 2008 Down was awarded the AFI Best Direction in Film Award and AFI Best Original Screenplay Award (along with Jimmy The Exploder) for the Black Balloon. The film also won the L'Oreal Paris AFI Award for Best Film.

Down's other feature film directing credits include The Honor List (2018), starring Meghan Rienks and Sasha Pieterse and Feel the Beat (2020) starring Sofia Carson.

== Awards ==
- The Black Balloon Winner Best Feature Film – Berlin International Film Festival, Generation 14+ section, 2008
- Summer Angst Winner Best Actor Female – Tropfest, 2004
- The Bathers Winner Grand Prix Split International Festival of New Film, 2003
- The Bathers Winner Best Fiction Montecatini International Short Film Festival, 2003
- The Bathers Special Mention Youth Jury – Locarno International Film Festival, 2002
- Her Outback Winner – State ACS Award (Gold) for Cinematography in a short documentary, 2002
- Her Outback Winner Best Director and Best Cinematographer – Kaleidoscope Short Film Festival, 2002
- Samantha Stewart, aged fourteen Winner Best Drama and Best Editing – WA Screen Awards, 2001
- Samantha Stewart, aged fourteen Commended at the DENDY Awards for the under 15 minutes fiction category, 2001
