= Gemma Ward =

Australian model and actress (born 1987)

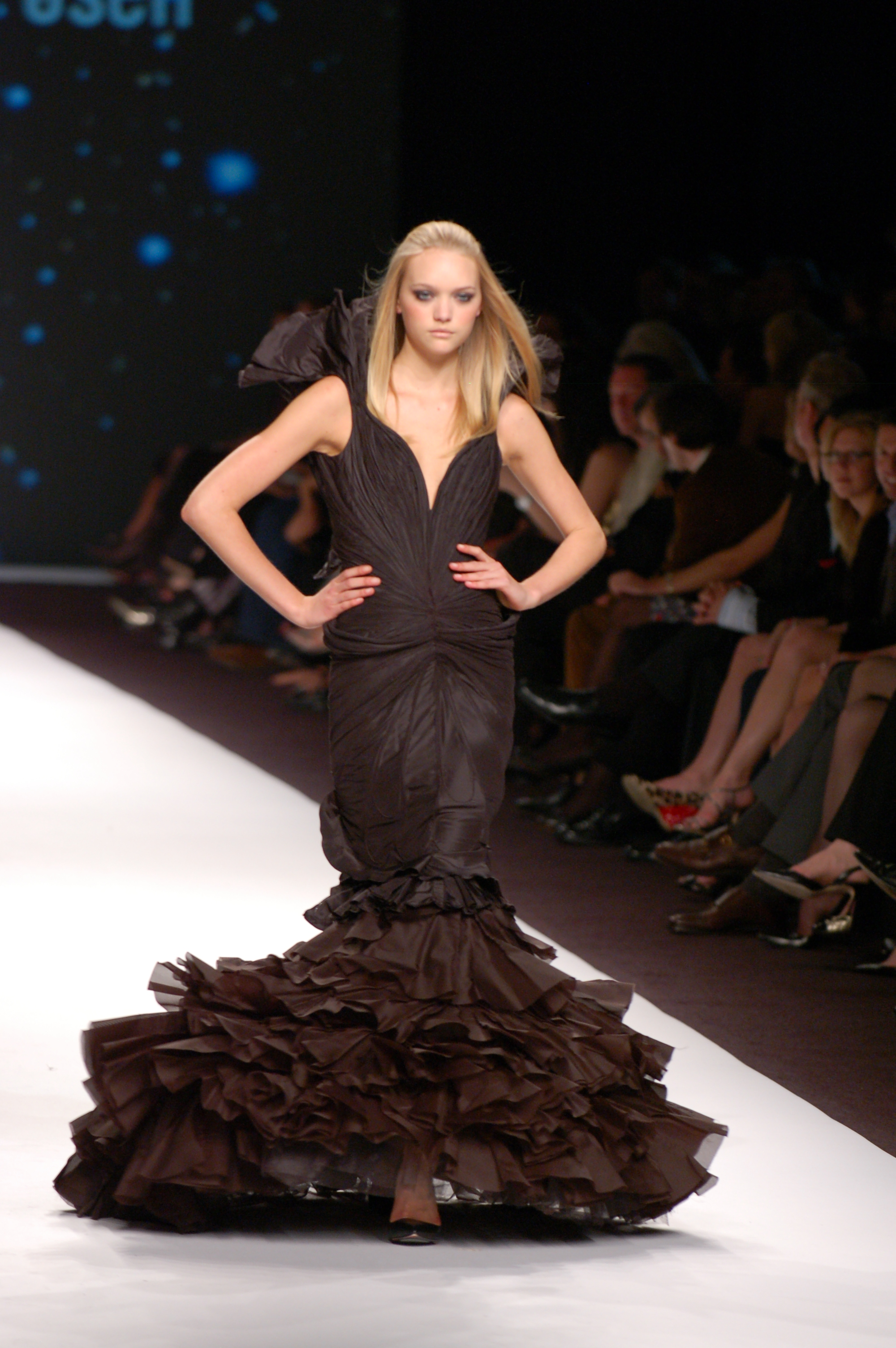
- Ward in San Francisco, 15 March 2007
- Born: Gemma Louise Ward; 3 November 1987 (age 39); Perth, Western Australia, Australia
- Occupations: Model, actress
- Years active: 2003–present
- Partner: David Letts (2008–present)
- Children: 3
- Modeling information
- Height: 5 ft 11.5 in (182 cm) (Note: Ward stated in a 2004 interview that, at the time, she stood 178 cm tall. However, both the Fashion Model Directory and IMG Models list her height as 5 feet 11.5 inches (1.816 m) in 2025, while a 2016 Vogue article describes her as "nearly 6 feet-tall".)
- Hair color: Blonde
- Eye color: Blue
- Agency: IMG Models (New York, Paris, Milan, London, Sydney)

Gemma Louise Ward (born 3 November 1987) is an Australian model and actress. Born in Perth, Western Australia, Ward was first scouted at the age of 14, and made her Australian Fashion Week debut aged 15. She later became one of the youngest models to appear on the cover of the American edition of Vogue, subsequently appearing on the covers of both Teen Vogue and Time. Vogue Paris would later declare her as one of the top 30 models of the 2000s. Ward is widely considered to be a supermodel.

Ward's first major acting appearance was in the 2008 Australian film The Black Balloon, and she has since also appeared in the films The Strangers (2008) and Pirates of the Caribbean: On Stranger Tides (2011).

== Early life ==
Gemma Ward was born in Perth, Western Australia, the second of four children of Gary Ward, an Australian doctor, and Claire, an English nurse. She has an older sister, Sophie (who also became a model), and younger twin brothers, Oscar and Henry. She was educated at the Presbyterian Ladies' College and Shenton College. Gemma was the family clown whose ambition was acting. Her passion for acting was born in 1997, when she was cast as the witch in a school play of Hansel and Gretel at age ten.

Ward's brush with modelling was an accidental one. She was discovered in 2002, at the age of fourteen, while accompanying her friends to the Australian modelling competition Search for a Supermodel. As she said in a Teen Vogue interview, she ended up being scouted herself.

I had come straight from my auntie and uncle's farm, and I was wearing this big gray barn jacket with mud all over it. When the scout came up to me, I said, 'No, thank you.' They forged my mum's signature [for mandatory parental consent], and pushed me in front of the cameras.

Ward did not win the competition, but her fragile, unique look got the attention of a spotter from Vivien's Model Agency who saw her potential and made a show reel. The show reel then landed on the desk of ace model scout David Cunningham from the New York City agency IMG. "Look how confident she is. I mean, she looks like she's been doing this for years, and she's a 15-year-old kid walking in an alleyway in Perth [...] She's a supermodel, for sure," Cunningham said.

== Career ==
=== Modeling ===
==== It girl, 2004–07 ====
She walked Atelier Versace Spring/Summer 2004 Haute Couture show at 16 she was the most famous face at the show.While At 15, Ward made her Australian Fashion Week debut on 5 May 2003. Within a year, she was in Italy meeting Prada designer Miuccia Prada. Her look inspired a new generation of baby doll-like models such as Vlada Roslyakova, Heather Marks, Lily Cole, Caroline Trentini, Britni Stanwood, Lisa Cant. In September 2004, at only sixteen, Ward became the youngest model to appear on the cover of American Vogue photographed by Steven Meisel as one of the nine "Models of the Moment" with Daria Werbowy, Natalia Vodianova, Gisele Bündchen, Isabeli Fontana, Karolina Kurkova, Liya Kebede, Hana Soukupova and Karen Elson. By the end of the year, Ward had appeared on the cover of Australian Vogue three times, British Vogue, Vogue Paris and Vogue Japan.

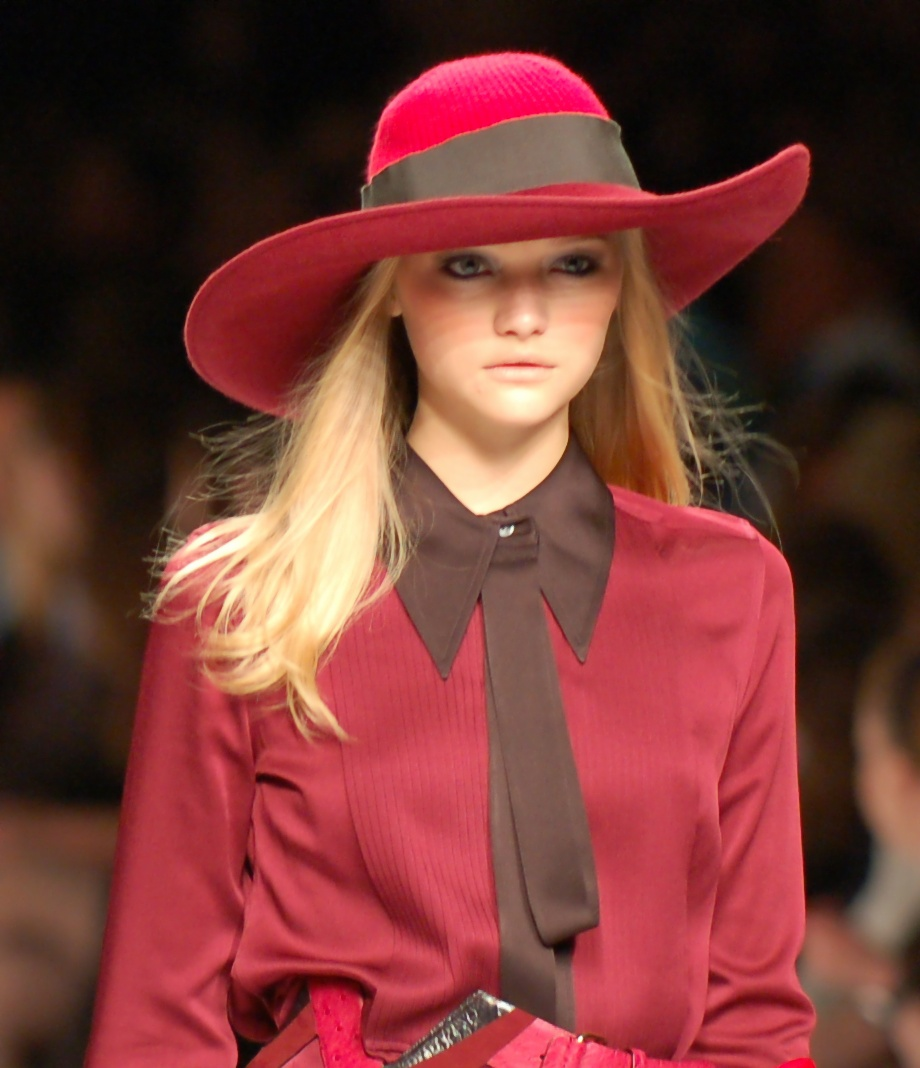
Ward modeling in San Francisco, 15 March 2007

In February 2005, Ward appeared in no less than 20 New York runways for designers that included Vera Wang, Oscar de la Renta and Calvin Klein, and was rumored to earn about $20,000 per show. And at 17, she became the famous face of Calvin Klein's Obsession Night perfume billboards – bumping Kate Moss out of a job in the process. Ward was reportedly paid $1.3 million for the Calvin Klein campaign and counted similar deals with Burberry and Valentino among her model earnings. Ward additionally appeared in campaigns for Dolce & Gabbana, Balenciaga, Hermès and Dior.

Ward then posed for the April 2005 issue of Vogue Italia, the May issue of Vogue Greece and the Spring 2005 cover of Time's Style & Design issue. In September 2005, Ward secured a coveted place on the inaugural cover of Vogue China posing between Chinese models Du Juan and Wang Wenqin and was shot by leading photographer Patrick Demarchelier. A staggering 300,000 copies sold in the first three hours. "She is every inch blue chip," Vivien's agent Suzie Deveridge said. "Right now she's considered the No. 2 model in the world – and she isn't even 18 yet."

By 2006, Ward became Australia's brightest fashion star since Elle Macpherson. At the age of 18, Ward became the first model ever to appear on the cover of Teen Vogue magazine. She was then featured in the Australian television program 60 Minutes as the "It Girl". She was earning $25,000 to stride the catwalk. In Allure magazine (October 2006), Ward is described as "the model of the moment." Allure's creative director Paul Cavaco stated: "We went through a period that was very va-va-voom, but now the pendulum has swung back. Gemma is ethereal, not earthy." Photographer Michael Thompson says, "She's an exotic blonde, the rarest of creatures."

In May 2007, Ward again was featured on the cover of Vogue Italia. In July, earning at an estimated total of $3 million in the past 12 months, Forbes ranked her tenth on the list of the World's 15 Top-Earning Supermodels. In October 2007 Ward appeared on the cover of the very first issue of Vogue India, centred between Bollywood actresses Bipasha Basu and Priyanka Chopra shot by photographer Patrick Demarchelier (who also photographed her in Vogue China) and it became the second time Ward has appeared on an inaugural issue. Ward is only the third model, after Moss and Linda Evangelista to appear on two inaugural issues of Vogue. Vogue Paris declared her one of the top 30 models of the 2000s.

==== Retirement claims, 2008–13 ====
In August 2008, reports surfaced that Ward was to retire from modelling to pursue acting. However, reports were quickly dismissed by Ward herself saying: "I was surprised to wake up this morning and read news of my own retirement. While I am taking some time off currently to rest and enjoy the company of friends and family, I am still very much a (excited and enthusiastic) working model and actress. I'm only 20, for God's sakes."

Ward wouldn't walk down a runway after the spring 2008 shows for five years. Her final modeling job before her hiatus was an appearance on the cover of and inside the October 2008 issue of Spanish Marie Claire. Slightly over a year later, in November 2009, Ward's agent officially announced her retiring from the industry after her notable absence in the past few runway seasons. Following a series of criticisms about her weight gain, a spokesperson from Vivien's Model Management released a statement, saying: "Gemma hasn't committed to returning to modeling at any time soon", adding Ward had the agency's full support. Again, Ward quickly dismissed the retirement claims, confirming that she would return to modeling in 2010.

After avoiding the spotlight for three years, Ward opened up in an exclusive interview for The Sunday Telegraph on 30 January 2011. There she explained that her break from the media spotlight "was something spurred by Heath's death". As for her career, she went on to say:

In terms of me shying away from modelling, I'd like to clarify in some way that I was taking a break from many things in my life and obviously what people in the public see is that I'm pulling away from what is more 'public'. I didn't know how long it would take, I didn't know if it would solve anything, but I set out to really focus inside myself.

Ward shot her first pictorial in years in Australia's Sunday Telegraph Magazine for the edition of 6 February 2011. In 2013, Ward signed with IMG Models Australia, prompting rumours of a modelling comeback.

==== Return to the runway, 2014–present ====
On 18 September 2014, Ward returned to the runway at the Spring/Summer 2015 Prada show during Milan Fashion Week. In December, Ward appeared on the 55th Anniversary cover of Australian Vogue and along with a 40th-anniversary campaign for Country Road, was announced as the face of Prada's Spring/Summer 2015 campaign. She was also featured on the Spring/Summer 2015 cover of Pop. In April 2015, Ward made her runway return to Australian Fashion Week, opening for Ellery. Ward also became the Australian ambassador for Coca-Cola Life. In September, Ward was on the cover of Russh. In January 2016, she again appeared on the cover of Australian Vogue, also appearing in a Spring/Summer 2016 campaign for Givenchy alongside models including Joan Smalls, Natalia Vodianova and fellow Australian Miranda Kerr. Ward then walked for Calvin Klein menswear at Autumn/Winter Milan Fashion Week. In April, Ward was shot by Mario Testino as part of his guest edited edition of Australian Vogue, their first time working together since 2006. She interviewed Testino about the issue for The Daily Telegraph. The same month, Ward posed for the cover of Australian InStyle alongside close friends and fellow models Jessica Gomes and Nicole Trunfio. In May, it was announced that Ward would appear as a guest judge on cycle 10 of Australia's Next Top Model.

She was featured on the July cover of Elle Australia, a "lift-and flip" edition with 35 possible cover combinations of Ward. Ward also featured in a Fall/Winter campaign for David Webb, shot by Inez and Vinoodh.

At the Spring 2019 shows, Ward walked for Proenza Schouler and Alexander McQueen. She then appeared in editorials for November's Allure and Vogue Italia and graced the October cover of Vogue Thailand, the December cover of Australian Harper's Bazaar, and the March 2019 cover of Numéro Tokyo. Ward also currently serves as the face of the Hardy Brothers and Zimmermann.

=== Acting ===
Ward has long aspired to pursue acting, and drama is a passion that she has held since she was a child. She starred alongside Toni Collette and Rhys Wakefield in Australian director Elissa Down's film The Black Balloon as the girlfriend of a boy whose brother has autism. The Black Balloon had its world premiere at the 58th Berlin International Film Festival in Germany in February 2008, where it received a Crystal Bear as the best feature-length film in the Generation 14plus category. She was also cast opposite Liv Tyler in the suspense thriller The Strangers as one of the three masked intruders, "Dollface". In the summer of 2009, she took classes at the Stella Adler Studio of Acting in New York.

After three years out of the spotlight, Ward made her international stage debut on 22 March 2011 for the Perth Theatre Company's production of The Ugly One. The play centres on the modern obsession with physical beauty and the need to resort to plastic surgery. Her star power brought the PTC publicity and boosted ticket sales. PerthNow's Maria Noakes gave Ward positive reviews for her performance.

MTV Networks' NextMovie.com named her one of the 'Breakout Stars to Watch for in 2011'. In the summer of 2011, Ward played Tamara, an antagonistic mermaid, in Pirates of the Caribbean: On Stranger Tides, opposite Johnny Depp.

== Personal life ==
Ward briefly dated Heath Ledger. They first met in November 2007 in New York, and Ward later said they had "developed a relationship and we started seeing each other." The two spent Christmas together in their home town of Perth before returning to New York where Ledger died less than a month later, on 22 January 2008.

Ward and her partner David Letts have three children: a daughter (born December 2013), a son (born January 2017), and a second daughter (born June 2020).

Ward is close friends with fellow Australian models Jessica Gomes and Nicole Trunfio, with Gomes and Ward being bridesmaids at Trunfio's wedding.

== Filmography ==
=== Television ===
| Year | Title | Role | Notes |
|---|---|---|---|
| 2024 | Ladies in Black | Sadie Chalmers | 1 episode |
| 2023 | While the Men Are Away | Sadie | 2 episodes |

=== Movies ===
| Year | Title | Role | Notes |
|---|---|---|---|
| 2001 | Pink Pyjamas | Heidi | |
| 2008 | The Black Balloon | Jackie Masters | Nominated – Film Critics Circle of Australia Award for Best Actress; Nominated – Inside Film Award for Best Actress |
| 2008 | The Strangers | Dollface | |
| 2011 | Pirates of the Caribbean: On Stranger Tides | Tamara–First Mermaid | |
| 2013 | The Great Gatsby | Languid Girl | |
| 2016 | The Caged Pillows | Nocturne | Short film |

=== Music videos ===
- "Daughters" by John Mayer
- "M.I.L.F. $" by Fergie
