= Rhys Wakefield =

Australian actor

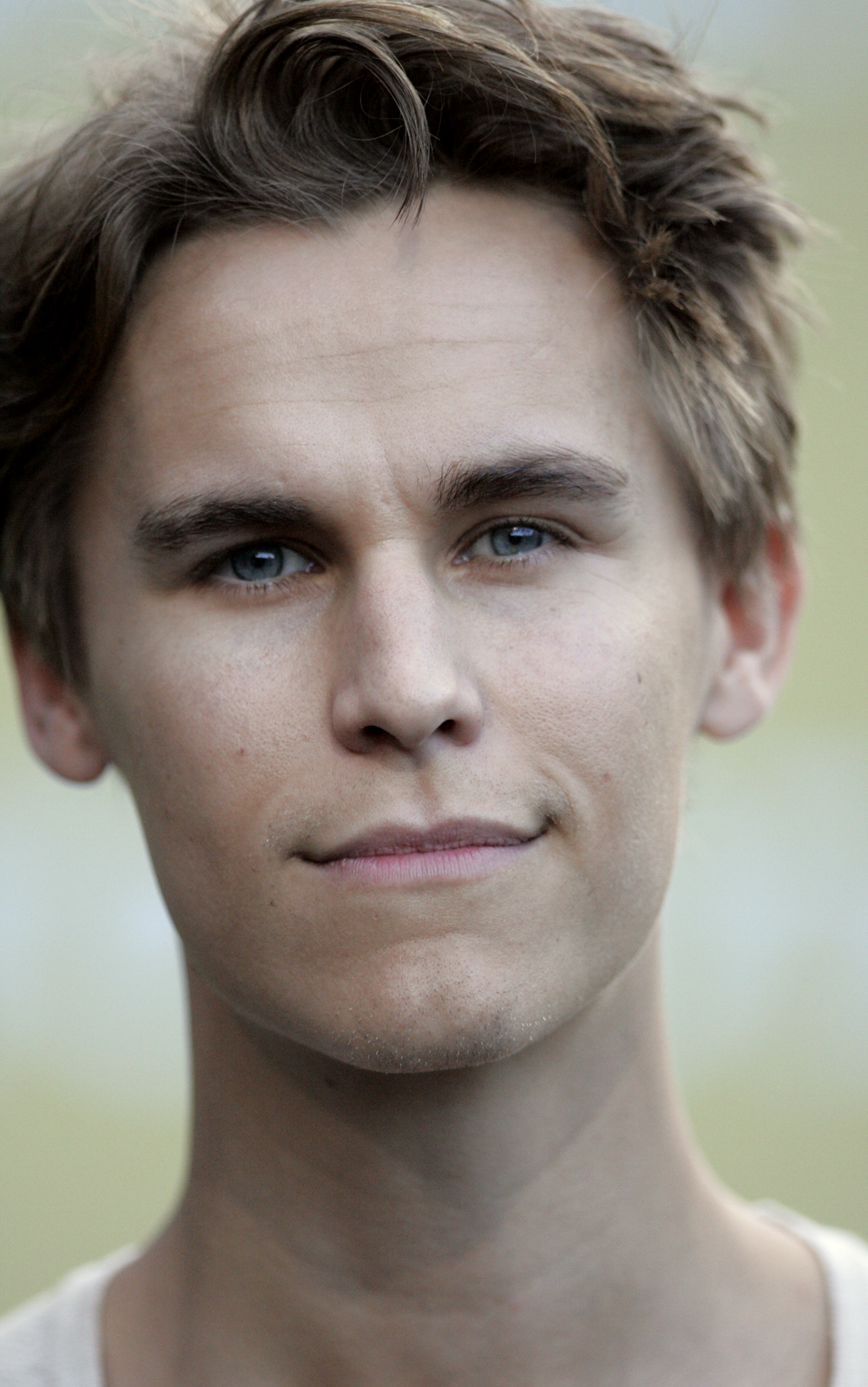
- Wakefield at the 2013 Tropfest
- Born: 1988 (age 37–38); Cairns, Queensland, Australia
- Occupations: Actor, director
- Years active: 2000–present
- Children: 1

Rhys Wakefield (born 1988) is an Australian actor and director, known for his roles in Australian TV series Home and Away, the feature film The Black Balloon (2008) and in season 3 of HBO's True Detective in 2019.

Wakefield's debut feature film as director, Berserk, was released in American cinemas on 5 April 2019. He is also the director and co-creator of sci-fi podcast series, From Now, which is being developed into a TV Series with Amazon Studios.

== Early life and education ==
Wakefield was born in Cairns, Queensland, to a medical standards officer mother and a father who serves in the navy. Before appearing as Lucas in Home and Away, Wakefield had been acting for more than six years. He attended classes at McDonald College of Performing Arts where he won the acting scholarship in 2003, during which time he performed in numerous Shakespeare festivals, working with both Opera Australia and the Australian Ballet. Wakefield graduated in 2006.

== Career ==
His first professional acting role was on the Australian TV series Don't Blame Me, where he appeared in two episodes.

In August 2005, Wakefield was cast as Lucas Holden in the long-running Australian soap opera Home and Away. His character was the youngest child of the Holden family until his father Tony and stepmother Rachel had his baby brother Harry. His performance on the series led to a Logie nomination for 'Best New Talent' in 2006. During his time on the show he was involved in a controversial storyline which led the Australian broadcasting regulator (ACMA) to conclude that scenes had breached the Australian broadcasting code, a finding which was responsible for the series being re-classified as PG.

Wakefield played his first leading role in a feature film in The Black Balloon as Thomas Mollison which led to a nomination for Best Actor by the Australian Film Institute and the Australian Film Critics Circle. The film opened on 6 March 2008 in Australia after premiering at the Berlin International Film Festival in Germany, where it received the Crystal Bear as the best feature-length film in the Generation 14plus category.

Wakefield has played the lead in Sanctum, the Polite Leader in The Purge franchise, and as Dick Cheney in The First Lady.

As a filmmaker, Wakefield co-wrote and directed the short film A Man Walks Into a Bar which was a finalist at the 2013 Tropfest International Short Film Festival in Sydney. His screenplay, entitled Please Close the Gate was a feature finalist at the 2016 Cinequest Film Festival Screenwriting competition and was officially selected for the Beverly Hills Film festival that same year.

Wakefield plays Freddy Burns in season 3 of HBO's True Detective.

Wakefield's first directed feature film, Berserk, was released in American cinemas on 5 April 2019. It stars Nick Cannon, James Roday, Nora Arnezeder, Erin Moriarty and Jack Falahee and was executive produced by Brian Kavanaugh-Jones. The film was partially based on someone trying to break into Wakefield's home. Wakefield also co-wrote and produced the film with William Day Frank.

Wakefield was listed by TVLine as one of their 'Breakout Stars to Watch' for his leading performance as Matty in Reprisal on Hulu.

In 2021, it was announced that Amazon Studios won rights to adapt QCode sci-fi podcast series, From Now, as a TV series. Golden Globe winners Richard Madden (Game of Thrones) and Brian Cox (Succession) will serve as executive producers. The podcast series, which stars Cox and Madden, debuted in late December 2020 and peaked at number two overall in the Apple Podcast global charts. The podcast was created by Wakefield and William Day Frank. The duo will adapt the series for TV. In an interview with the Wall Street Journal, Wakefield said that from the beginning they had planned for the podcast "to come to the screen eventually".

== Accolades ==
Wakefield was nominated for Best Actor in a Feature Film by the Australian Film Institute and the Film Critics Circle of Australia for his performance in The Black Balloon. His AFI nomination for Best Actor in The Black Balloon is Australia's equivalent of the Academy Awards. Wakefield was nominated against Guy Pearce, William McInnes and David Roberts. The Australian Film Institute is now known as the Australian Academy of Cinema and Television Arts (AACTA) Awards.

== Filmography ==
=== Film ===
Year	Title	Role	Notes
2000	Bootmen	Dancing kid	
2008	The Black Balloon	Thomas Mollison	Nominated – AACTA Award for Best Actor in a Leading Role
2009	Broken Hill	Scott Price	
2011	Sanctum	Josh McGuire	
2012	Nobody Walks	David	
2013	The Purge	Polite Leader	Fright Meter Award for Best Supporting Actor
2013	+1	David	
2013	After the Dark	James	
2014	Endless Love	Keith Butterfield	
2015	Echoes of War	Marcus McCluske	
2015	Cardboard Boxer	J.J.	
2016	Paint It Black	Michael	
2017	You Get Me	Chase	
2018	The Grand Son	Todd	also associate producer
2019	Berserk	Evan	also director, writer, producer
2019	Bliss	Actor	also producer

=== Television ===
Year	Title	Role	Notes
2002	Don't Blame Me	Brad	Episodes 11 & 12
2005–08	Home and Away	Lucas Holden	Regular role
2013	Rita		TV movie
2019	True Detective	Freddy Burns	Regular role
2019	Reprisal	Matty	Regular role
2022	The First Lady	Dick Cheney	Recurring role

=== Short films ===
Title	Year	Role
"An Actor Prepares"	2006	Himself
"The Mirror"	2008	
"Clearing the Air"	2008	David
"A Man Walks Into a Bar"	2013	Man, also director, writer, producer
