= Come Rain or Come Shine (musical) =

- Music: Tim Finn
- Lyrics: Tim Finn; Simon Phillips
- Book: Carolyn Burns
- Basis: Short story "Come Rain or Come Shine" by Kazuo Ishiguro
- Premiere: 20 June 2022: Southbank Theatre, Melbourne
- Productions: 2022 Melbourne

Come Rain or Come Shine is a musical with book by Carolyn Burns, music by Tim Finn, and lyrics by Tim Finn and Simon Phillips. Set in London, the musical is based on Kazuo Ishiguro’s comic short story of the same name.

It was premiered by the Melbourne Theatre Company at the Southbank Theatre from 20 June to 23 July 2022. The production featured Angus Grant (Ray), Gillian Cosgriff (Emily) and Chris Ryan (Charlie).

== Original cast ==
Character	Actor
Emily	Gillian Cosgriff
Ray	Angus Grant
Charlie	Chris Ryan

== Reception ==
The musical received mixed reviews. Patricia Maunder in Limelight said that "although it doesn’t entirely work, unlike some more toe-tapping musicals for which the pleasure is essentially in the moment, this new offering from Phillips and Finn keeps on tugging at one’s brain and heart after it’s over." Giselle Au-Nhien Nguyen in The Guardian said that "with some moments of great humour and strong performances, it’s an entertaining enough way to spend a couple of hours, if not disappointing given the pedigree of its team." Kate Herbert in The Age concluded the musical was "a courageous, but ultimately unsatisfying show that, with more development, could reach its potential."
