= Steven Vidler (actor) =

Australian actor (born 1960)

- Born: August 9, 1960 (age 66); Sydney, Australia
- Education: National Institute of Dramatic Art (1981–1983; 1992); Swinburne University of Technology (1993–1994); AFTRS (1994–1995); UCLA; Macquarie University (2010–2015)
- Occupations: Actor, screenwriter, director
- Years active: 1980–current
- Known for: Two Hands (1999); Jeopardy (2005); Home and Away (2007–2008); Dance Academy (2013)

Steven Vidler (born 9 August 1960) is an Australian actor, screenwriter and director known for his part in the Scottish–Australian series Jeopardy.

== Early life and education ==
Vidler was born on 9 August 1960 in Sydney, Australia. He grew up in the Australian Outback, in a family of Vietnam veterans.

In 1981, Vidler began his formal trained at Sydney's National Institute of Dramatic Art (NIDA), graduating in 1983 with a Bachelor of Dramatic Art and Acting. From 1993 to 1994, he studied a Graduate Diploma in Film Directing at Swinburne University of Technology. He then continued his studies at NIDA, undertaking an Actor-Director relationship course, run in collaboration with AFTRS from 1994 to 1995.

Vidler also studied writing and directing at UCLA while on a fellowship as an intern for Atman Entertainment. He also studied Playwriting at NIDA in 1992. He obtained a research PhD in screenwriting from Macquarie University in 2015, which used cognitive neuroscience to explore viewer engagement with characters in film.

== Career ==
=== Film ===
Vidler's first film appearance was in 1984 WWII television film The Blood of Others opposite Jodie Foster. He played Sugar, the younger brother, in pre-WWII 1987 film The Good Wife (also known as The Umbrella Woman) alongside Rachel Ward, Bryan Brown and Sam Neill. Other early film roles include Dick Marston in TV movie Robbery Under Arms (1985) alongside Sam Neill, the lead role of Eddie in sci-fi film Incident at Raven's Gate (1988) and Jack Donaghue in Outback (1989) also known as Wrangler or Minnamurra.

Vidler played Lieutenant Gore in 1998 American war epic The Thin Red Line. He worked with Heath Ledger, when he played alongside him as 'The Man' in 1999 crime thriller Two Hands, also featuring Rose Byrne and Bryan Brown. That same year, he played Captain William in 1999 survival film Dog Watch, alongside Joel Edgerton. He then had roles in comedy films The Crocodile Hunter: Collision Course (2002) and Bad Eggs (2003).

Vidler played officer Frank Williams in 2006 horror film See No Evil, as well as its sequel the following year. In 2013, he played Neil Webster, Tara's father in the Australian drama film Dance Academy.

=== Television ===
Vidler had an early television role as Tropp in 1985 miniseries, The Dunera Boys. He had recurring roles in several television series in the 1990s, including playing Phil McCarthy in ABC drama miniseries Heartland, opposite Cate Blanchett and Ernie Dingo. Others included Frankie's House, Janus and MDA. He also appeared in the 1998 miniseries The Day of the Roses, based on the real life story of the 1977 Granville rail disaster.

In 2001, Vidler had a guest role as Captain Askwith in the third season of action adventure series The Lost World, an adaptation of Sir Arthur Conan Doyle’s 1912 novel of the same name. Beginning in 2002, he played the part of the teacher in BAFTA award-winning children's sci-fi drama series Jeopardy. In 2004, he featured in several miniseries, including The Mystery of Natalie Wood as Richard Gregson, Through My Eyes as Charlwood and Salem's Lot as Sheriff Parkins Gillespie.

In 2006, Vidler appeared as Steve in critically-acclaimed series Love My Way, alongside Claudia Karvan and Asher Keddie. From 2007 to 2008, he played the recurring role of Noel Anderson on long-running soap opera Home and Away. Vidler played the recurring role of a police commander in the 2012 season of Underbelly (Underbelly: Badness). He also had recurring roles as Mark Mackey in Packed to the Rafters in 2013) and as the Premier in two seasons of Rake in 2012 and 2014.

Throughout his career Vidler has also had guest roles in numerous television series including A Country Practice, G.P., Bony, Snowy River: The McGregor Saga, Halifax f.p., Police Rescue, State Coroner, Big Sky, Wildside, Water Rats, Stingers, SeaChange and McLeod's Daughters.

=== Writing and directing ===
Vidler made his feature film directorial debut with the award-winning 1997 film Blackrock, known for being Heath Ledger's first film role. Together with Nicholas Hammond, Vidler co-wrote 1998 miniseries A Difficult Woman, which won the Silver World Medal for best miniseries at the New York Festivals.

Vidler wrote and directed 2019 film Standing Up for Sunny, starring Breaking Bad's RJ Mitte. The film won the award for Best Indie Film at the 2020 AACTA Awards.

Vidler currently works as a screenwriter, director and script assistant with his company Sidekick Pictures, based in Hollywood.

== Acting credits ==
=== Film ===
Year	Title	Role	Note
1984	The Blood of Others	Autre Manifestant	
1985	Robbery Under Arms	Dick Marston	
1987	The Good Wife	Sugar Hills	Also known as The Umbrella Woman
1988	Incident at Raven's Gate	Eddie	Also known as Encounter at Raven's Gate
1989	Outback	Jack Donaghue	Also known as Minnamurra or Wrangler
1990	Harbour Beat	Lance Cooper	
1993	Desperate Journey: The Allison Wilcox Story	Lieutenant Commander Jack Harkin	
1994	No Worries	Gary Hay	
1995	Napoleon	Snake / Galah / Mouse	
1996	The Territorians	Robert McCabe	
1998	The Thin Red Line	2nd Lieutenant Gore	
1999	Two Hands	The Man	
1999	Dog Watch	The Captain	
2001	Finding Hope	Nobby	
2002	The Crocodile Hunter: Collision Course	Deputy Director Ansell	
2002	A Ring of Endless Light	Mr. Gray	
2003	Bad Eggs	Detective Pendlebury	
2006	See No Evil	Officer Frank Williams	
2007	The Home Song Stories	Bill	
2007	See No Evil 2	Officer Frank Williams	

=== Television ===
Year	Title	Role	Note
1984	Displaced Persons	Alexander	TV movie
1985	The Dunera Boys	Tropp	Miniseries
1987	The Perfectionist	Erik	TV movie
1991	A Country Practice	Phillip Dalton	2 episodes
1991	G.P.	Doug	1 episode
1991	Bony	Jackson	1 episode
1991	Heartland	Phil McCarthy	6 episodes
1992	Frankie's House	Steve Cotler	
1995	Snowy River: The McGregor Saga	Daniel Larson	1 episode
1995	Janus	Danny Wyatt	4 episodes
1995	Halifax f.p.	Steve Kingsley	1 episode
1995	Police Rescue	Scuderi	1 episode
1997	State Coroner	Salmon	1 episode
1997	Big Sky	Cameron	1 episode
1998	The Day of the Roses	Dick Lamb	Miniseries
1998	Wildside	Trevor Kierney	1 episode
1999	Water Rats	Brian Geary	1 episode
1999	Stingers	Todd Tregear	1 episode
1999	SeaChange	The Ghost	1 episode
1999	MDA	Nick Clarke	3 episodes
1999	Young Lions	Sergeant Brian Graham	1 episode
2000	The Love of Lionel's Life	Robbie	TV movie
2001	Child Star: The Shirley Temple Story	Darryl F. Zanuck	TV movie
2001	Blonde	Warren	TV movie
2004	The Mystery of Natalie Wood	Richard Gregson	TV movie
2004	Through My Eyes	Inspector Graeme Charlwood	Miniseries
2004	Small Claims	Ross	TV movie
2004	Salem's Lot	Sheriff Parkins Gillespie	Miniseries
2005	Jeopardy	Gerry Simmons	19 episodes
2006	Love My Way	Steven	9 episodes
2006	McLeod's Daughters	Hugh Doyle	1 episode
2007–2008	Home and Away	Noel Anderson	23 episodes
2009	Satisfaction	Terence	3 episodes
2012	Underbelly: Badness	Police Commander	8 episodes
2013	Packed to the Rafters	Mark Mackey	3 episodes
2013	Dance Academy	Neil Webster	8 episodes
2014	Rake	NSW Premier	3 episodes

=== Theatre ===
Year	Title	Role	Note	Ref.
1980	The Jubilee Horror or Sherlock Holmes' Finest Hour	Q Theatre Workshop member	Bankstown Town Hall Theatre Restaurant with Q Theatre	
1982	Spring Awakening	Melchior	NIDA Theatre, Sydney	
1982	The Cherry Orchard	Simeonov-Pishchik	NIDA Theatre, Sydney	
1982	Measure for Measure	Angelo	NIDA Theatre, Sydney	
1983	The Money or the Box?		NIDA Theatre, Sydney	
1983	Traitors	Joseph Rubin	NIDA Theatre, Sydney	
1983	Love's Labour's Lost	Dull	NIDA Theatre, Sydney, Playhouse, Canberra, University of Newcastle	
1983	Summer Rain	Peter Bannister	NIDA Theatre, Sydney	
1985	A Midsummer Night's Dream	Lysander	Seymour Centre, Sydney	
1987	Hamlet / Henry IV, Part 1		STC	
1987	Onkaparinga		Festival of Sydney with DT2 Company	
1987–1988	Away	Tom / Ric	Sydney Opera House with STC	
1988	Away	Tom	Pepsico Summerfare New York with STC	
1988	Summer of the Seventeenth Doll	Johnny	Pepsico Summerfare New York with STC	
1988	1841		Sydney Opera House with STC, Playhouse, Adelaide with STCSA	
1988	The Seagull	Konstantin	Playhouse, Adelaide with STCSA	
1989	The Tempest	Caliban	Playhouse, Adelaide with STCSA	
1990	Words of One Syllable	Robert	Belvoir St Theatre, Sydney	
1991	Henry IV, Part 1	Gadshill / Douglas / various	Sydney Olympic Park, Blackfriars Theatre, Sydney with STC	
1991	King Golgrutha	Achilles / Simon from Loans / Georg, the Ex	Playhouse, Adelaide with STCSA	
1992	Britannicus	Nero	NIDA Theatre, Sydney	
1992	Lost in Yonkers	Uncle Louie / Eddie	Australian tour with STC	
1993	Picasso at the Lapin Agile		Malthouse Theatre, Melbourne with Playbox Theatre Company	
1994	Hamlet	Fortinbras / various	Belvoir St Theatre, Sydney	
1999	Popcorn	Bruce	Pictures This Productions	
Undated	Planet Pres	Hero	Playhouse, Perth	
Undated	Death of a Salesman		STC	
Undated	Development Site		HSC Schools Program with STC	
Undated	King Lear	Goneril / various	STC	

== Writer / director credits ==
=== Film ===
Year	Title	Role	Note	Ref.
1984	The Blood of Others	Trainee assistant director		
1991	Blood Runners	Director	Short film	
1993	Fishing	Writer / Director / Producer	Short film	
1994	Hell, Texas & Home	Writer	Short film	
1995	Audacious	Script editor	Short film	
1997	Blackrock	Director / Script editor		
2009	Handyman	Writer	As yet unproduced	
2010	Horrendo's Curse	Writer	As yet unproduced	
2012	The Fourth Knot	Writer	As yet unproduced	
2019	Standing Up for Sunny	Writer / Director		

=== Television ===
Year	Title	Role	Note	Ref.
1995	G.P.	Writer	Season 7, episode 9: "Not Fade Away"	
1998	A Difficult Woman	Co-writer	Miniseries, 3 episodes	
2000	Above the Law	Writer	Season 1, episode 19: "Redline"	
2001	Corridors of Power	Writer	Season 1, episode 2	
2001	Finding Hope	Second Unit Director	TV movie	
2003	La bête du Gévaudan (aka Beast of Gévaudan)	Storyboard artist	TV movie	
2011	SLiDE	Script producer		
2011; 2012	Neighbours	Writer	3 episodes	
Undated	Home and Away	Script producer		
Undated	Hi-5	Writer / Lyricist		

=== Theatre ===
Year	Title	Role	Note	Ref.
2025	The Vanya Variations	Writer		

== Awards and nominations ==
Year	Work	Award	Category	Result	Ref.
1987	The Good Wife	Australian Film Institute Awards	Best Actor in a Supporting Role	Nominated	
1993	Fishing (graduate film)	Cinevex Script Award	Best Screenplay	Won	
1995	Steven Vidler	National Institute of Dramatic Art	The Gloria Payten and Gloria Dawn Fellowship	Recipient	
1995	Hell, Texas & Home	Australian Film Institute Awards	Best Screenplay in a Short Film	Nominated	
1995	Halifax f.p. (episode: "Hard Corps"	Australian Film Institute Awards	Best Performance by an Actor in a Television Drama	Won	
1997	Blackrock	Mystfest	Best Film	Nominated	
1997	Blackrock	Australian Film Institute Awards	Best Film	Nominated	
1997	Blackrock	Australian Film Institute Awards	Best Adapted Screenplay	Nominated	
1997	Blackrock	AWGIE Awards	Best Screenplay Adaptation	Won	
1997	Blackrock	AWGIE Awards	Best Script	Won	
1998	A Difficult Woman	New York Festivals	Silver World Medal for Best Miniseries	Won	
2009	Handyman	First Glance Screenwriting Competition	—N/a	Finalist	
2012	The Fourth Knot	Emerging Screenwriters Competition	—N/a	Finalist	
2014	Horrendo's Curse	Screencraft Family Film screenwriting competition	Best Screenplay	Semifinalist	
2019	Standing Up for Sunny	AACTA Awards	Best Indie Film	Won	
2025	The Vanya Variations	New Theatre	The Silver Gull Play Award	Won	
