= Dan Spielman =

Australian actor

Dan Spielman (born 1979) is an Australian actor. His career spans film, television and theatre.

== Early life ==
Spielman grew up with his younger sister in Beaumaris, Melbourne. Without formal acting training, Spielman has worked in theatre, television and film since graduating from high school in 1996 at St Michael's Grammar School, St Kilda, Victoria.

== Career ==
In 2005, Spielman became one of the youngest members of the Sydney Theatre Company's ensemble, The Actors' Company.

His television roles include Offspring and The Secret Life of Us. More recently he portrayed Ned Banks, the parental journalist brother of The Code's hacker Jesse Banks played by Ashley Zukerman. He has won and been nominated for many awards, including the Australian Film Institute Awards (AFI, now AACTA Awards). He was in the 2016 Australian mini-series, Deep Water set in Bondi, Sydney.

In 2018, Spielman appeared in Channel 7 drama series Secret Bridesmaids' Business, in 2023 he appeared in Channel 10 crime series North Shore and Stan series Bad Behaviour, Spielman, in 2024 was named for the second series of Black Snow (TV series). On 14 January, Spielman was named in the cast for Paramount+ series Playing Gracie Darling.

== Filmography ==
=== Film ===
Year	Title	Role	Notes
1999	The Date	Nick	Short film
2001	The Pitch	Filmmaker	Short film
2004	One Perfect Day	Tommy Matisse	Feature film
2004	Tom White	Matt	Feature film
2011	The Hunter	Simon	Feature film
2013	An Accidental Soldier	Harry Lambert	TV film

=== Television ===
Year	Title	Role	Notes
1997	Blue Heelers	Zac Taylor	TV series, episode: "Off the Air"
1997–98	Raw FM	Mark Mulholland	TV series
1998	Wildside	Chris O'Connor	TV series, episode: "1.33"
1998	Blabbermouth & Stickybeak	Mr. Segal	TV series
1999	Queen Kat, Carmel & St. Jude	Paul	TV series, episode: "Autumn: Carmel"
2001	Farscape	Sub-Officer Dacon	TV series, episode: "...Different Destinations"
2002	Stingers	Stephen Lucas	TV series, episode: "In the Gun"
2003	The Secret Life of Us	Dr. Patrick Tidy	TV series
2005	The Incredible Journey of Mary Bryant	Cox	TV miniseries
2009	Satisfaction	Robbie	TV series, episode: "Cyclone Chloe"
2009	Darwin's Brave New World	Alfred Wallace	TV series, episodes: "Origins", "Evolutions", "Publish and Be Damned"
2009	My Place	Irish Tradesman	TV series, episode: "1888 Victoria"
2011–12	Offspring	Andrew Holland	TV series
2014–16	The Code	Ned Banks	TV series
2015	Miss Fisher's Murder Mysteries	Dr. Harcourt	TV series, episode: "Blood & Money"
2016	Deep Water	Rhys Callahan	TV miniseries
2017	Sisters	Tim	TV series
2019	Secret Bridesmaids' Business	Michael Heyward	TV series, 6 episodes
2020	Stateless	David Meakin	TV series
2023	Bad Behaviour	Keith McKenzie	TV series
2023	North Shore	Simon Chilcott	TV series
2023-25	The Newsreader	Vincent Callahan	TV series, 6 episodes
2025	Black Snow	Leo Jacobs	TV series, season 2
2025	Playing Gracie Darling	Peter	In production

== Theatre ==
Year	Title	Role	Notes
1997	Homeland / A Glass of Twilight		Brotherhood of St Laurence Warehouse, Melbourne with La Mama
1998	Keene / Taylor Theatre Project Season 2: Neither Lost Nor Found / Untitled Monologue / Night, A Wall, Two Men	Matthew - Untitled Monologue	Brotherhood of St Laurence Warehouse, Melbourne with La Mama
1998	The Potting Shed		The Church, Gardenvale, Melbourne
1998	Clean Sweep		The Church, Gardenvale, Melbourne
1998	Keene / Taylor Theatre Project Season 3: To Whom it May Concern / Custody / What Remains of Dying		Brotherhood of St Laurence Warehouse, Melbourne
1999	The Ninth Moon	Ned	Malthouse Theatre, Melbourne for Melbourne Festival
2000	Keene / Taylor Theatre Project		Sydney Opera House for Sydney Festival
2001	The Choirbook		Span Gallery, Melbourne
2001	The Seagull	Konstantin	Playhouse, Melbourne with MTC
2002	Half and Half	Ned	Malthouse Theatre, Melbourne with Playbox Theatre Company
2002	Keene / Taylor Theatre Project: Dog		Fortyfivedownstairs, Melbourne, for Melbourne Festival
2005	A Journal of the Plague Year		Malthouse Theatre, Melbourne
2005	The Ham Funeral	Young Man / Narrator	Malthouse Theatre , Melbourne
2005	Ivanov	Lvov	Fortyfivedownstairs, Melbourne
2005	The Cherry Orchard	Trofimov	Wharf Theatre with STC
2006	Mother Courage and Her Children		Wharf Theatre with STC
2006	The Bourgeois Gentleman		Sydney Theatre with STC
2007	The Season at Sarsaparilla	Ron Suddards	Sydney Opera House with STC
2007	The Art of War	Larry	Wharf Theatre with STC
2007	A Midsummer Night's Dream	Puck	Sydney Theatre with STC
2008	Manna	Collaborator	Wharf Theatre, Sydney
2009	Knives in Hens	Gilbert Horn	Malthouse Theatre, Melbourne, Space Theatre, Adelaide with STCSA
2010	Cageling	Dramaturge / Creator	Fortyfivedownstairs, Melbourne, Carriageworks, Sydney, with The Rabble
2010	The Bedroom Project	Creator	Linden Centre for Contemporary Arts, Melbourne with The Rabble
2011	A Golem Story	Amos	Malthouse Theatre, Melbourne
2012	Macbeth		Sydney Opera House, Canberra Theatre Centre, Arts Centre, Melbourne with Bell Shakespeare Company
2016	The Blind Giant Is Dancing	Allen	Belvoir Street Theatre, Sydney
2017	Macbeth	Macduff	Southbank Theatre with MTC
2019	Photograph 51	Crick	MTC
2022	Sexual Misconduct of the Middle Classes	Jon	Fairfax Studio, Melbourne, Southbank Theatre, Melbourne, Belvoir Street Theatre & online with MTC
2026	Eliza	Professor Joseph Weizenbaum	Southbank Theatre with MTC

== Awards and nominations ==
Year	Nominated work	Award	Category	Result
1999	The Date	Tropfest	Best Male Actor	Won
2004	One Perfect Day	Inside Film Awards	Best Actor	Nominated
2004:	Tom White	FCCA Award	Best Male Supporting Actor	Won
2004:	Tom White	AFI Awards	Best Actor in a Supporting Role	Nominated
2004:	One Perfect Day	AFI Awards	Best Actor in a Leading Role	Nominated
2014	An Accidental Soldier	Equity Ensemble Awards	Outstanding Performance by an Ensemble in a Mini-series or Telemovie	Nominated
2015	The Code	AACTA Awards	Best Lead Actor in a Television Drama	Nominated
2022	New Gold Mountain	Equity Ensemble Awards	Outstanding Performance by an Ensemble in a Mini-series or Telemovie	Won
