= Margaret Sixel =

Australian and South African film editor

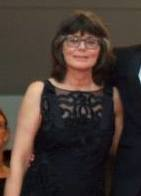
- Sixel at the 2015 Cannes Film Festival
- Born: South Africa
- Occupation: Film editor
- Years active: 1984–present
- Spouse: George Miller (m. 1995)
- Children: 2

Margaret Sixel is an Australian and South African film editor. She is best known for her work as editor on her husband George Miller's films, including Babe: Pig in the City (1998), Happy Feet (2006), and Mad Max: Fury Road (2015). For Fury Road, she won the Academy Award for Best Film Editing and the BAFTA Award for Best Editing.

== Early life and education ==
Margaret Sixel was born in South Africa.

She studied film editing at the Australian Film, Television and Radio School, earning a Specialist Extension Certificate in Film Editing in 1989.

== Career ==
In 1984, Sixel began work as an assistant editor and dubber on the Australian television mini-series, The Last Bastion (1984), where she met one of the directors of the picture, and future collaborator, George Miller. In the following five years, Sixel worked as an assistant and assembly editor on various projects such as The Great Gold Swindle (1984), Emoh Ruo (1985), The Blue Lightning (1986), A Case of Honour (1989), and Romero (1989), as well as dialogue editor for John Duigan's Flirting (1991).

In 1994, Sixel was appointed film editor for Kay Pavlou's dramatised Australian documentary, Mary (1994), about Australian saint Mary MacKillop. Three years later, Sixel edited the television documentary 40,000 Years of Dreaming (1997) for director George Miller. During the early 2000s, Sixel edited two short films under the direction of English-born Australian filmmaker Rachel Ward, The Blindman's Bluff (2000) and The Big House (2001). Sixel's remaining three feature film projects have since all been collaborations between herself and director George Miller, beginning in 1998 with Babe: Pig in the City (co-edited alongside Jay Friedkin), and followed by Happy Feet (co-edited alongside Christian Gazal) in 2006, and Mad Max: Fury Road in 2015.

=== Creative influence and process ===
Margaret Sixel has creatively contributed to the production of numerous projects throughout her career, including Babe (1995), in which George Miller credits her for turning the picture around by "declaring an early cut [of the film] too episodic and lacking in narrative tension, and suggesting the linking devices of chapter headings and singing mice." She received a "Special Thanks" credit for the film, as well as a "Thanks" in the credits of Happy Feet Two for contributions to "the story structure."

In regard to their creative relationship, Sixel has remarked that both Miller and herself collaboratively make up a "complete person." She has stated that being his spouse only helps in that they understand each other's sensibilities better, since "98 percent of the time [they] agree on [their] choices," which is important, "because when you are not in sync, lots of people have opinions in the editing room and you can really go off in the wrong direction."

==== Mad Max: Fury Road (2015) ====
In 2012, Sixel began editing Mad Max: Fury Road under the direction of George Miller. When asked why he chose his wife to edit his film, Miller observed that she had never cut an action movie before, and that if it were to be edited by "the usual kind of guys, it would look like every other action movie we see."

Because the majority of the film revolves around an intense road battle, featuring dozens of vehicular stunts and hundreds of individual extras, the location team would shoot with upwards of 20 cameras on any given set up. As a result, the editorial team on location processed between 10 and 20 hours of footage on a daily basis, which had to be flown back to Sydney, Australia, where Sixel and her editorial team would work on shaping the footage in conjunction with production. By the time principal photography had wrapped, Sixel was given over 470 hours of footage to edit, which took three months to merely view in its entirety.

For two years, Sixel worked for roughly 10 hours a day, 6 days a week, for a total of over 6,000 collective hours of editing to create the film's eventual 120 minute running length. The final edit of the film consisted of over 2,700 individual cuts, over twice as many as Miller's previous Mad Max installment, The Road Warrior (1981), which featured only 1,200 cuts in its 90-minute running time.

In 2016, Sixel won the Academy Award for Best Editing for her work on editing Mad Max: Fury Road. By winning this award, she became the first South African born editor to win an Academy Award. She also won the Best Editing award at the 21st Critics' Choice Awards, the 2016 ACE Eddie Award for Best Edited Feature Film – Dramatic, and the BAFTA Award for Best Editing.

==== Editorial team and role of gender ====
In regard to her role as a woman editor, Sixel has stated that she does not consider her gender to be relevant in the editing process. In an interview, she has stated that she works "with a lot of guys in the editing room. We don't think about it. I'm really into cutting film, and while George [Miller] likes to think it's a positive, I don't feel very female about it." In regard to her editorial team, Sixel has noted that 25 percent of her staff are women. Throughout her career working with Miller, Jason Ballantine was her first assistant and additional editor on every feature film from Babe: Pig in the City to Mad Max: Fury Road.

== Personal life ==
In 1995, Margaret Sixel married director George Miller; they have two sons, and Sixel has a stepdaughter from Miller's previous marriage.

In 2011, as a response to the tenth anniversary of the Tampa affair in 2001, the Australian Centre for Policy Development published a statement urging Australia's political leaders to break the stalemate on refugees and asylum seekers, which was "still sadly characterised by human tragedy, political opportunism, policy failure and great cost." Both Margaret Sixel and her husband, George Miller, supported and signed the public statement.

== Filmography ==
=== Editor ===
Year	Film	Director	Notes
1994	Mary	Kay Pavlou	Documentary
1997	40,000 Years of Dreaming	George Miller	Documentary
1998	Babe: Pig in the City	George Miller	
2000	Blindman's Bluff	Rachel Ward	Short film
2001	The Big House	Rachel Ward	Short film
2006	Happy Feet	George Miller	
2015	Mad Max: Fury Road	George Miller	AACTA Award for Best Editing; Academy Award for Best Film Editing; ACE Eddie Award for Best Edited Feature Film – Dramatic; BAFTA Award for Best Editing; Boston Society of Film Critics Award for Best Editing; Chicago Film Critics Association Award for Best Editing; Critics' Choice Movie Award for Best Editing; EDA Award for Best Editing; FCCA Award for Best Editing; Gold Derby Award for Best Film Editing; Online Film & Television Association Award for Best Film Editing; Online Film Critics Society Award for Best Editing; San Diego Film Critics Society Award for Best Editing; San Francisco Film Critics Circle Award for Best Film Editing; St. Louis Film Critics Association for Best Film Editing; Washington D.C. Area Film Critics Association Award for Best Editing; 2nd place — Los Angeles Film Critics Association Award for Best Editing; Nominated — Saturn Award for Best Editing
2022	Three Thousand Years of Longing	George Miller	
2024	Furiosa: A Mad Max Saga	George Miller	

==== Other credits ====
- The Last Bastion (1984) (assistant editor; assistant dubbing)
- The Great Gold Swindle (1984) (second assistant editor)
- Emoh Ruo (1985) (assistant editor)
- The Blue Lightning (1986) (assembly editor)
- A Case of Honour (1989) (first assistant editor)
- Romero (1989) (assistant editor)
- Flirting (1991) (dialogue editor)
