= Dog boy =

Term referring to certain prison inmates

Dog boy was a term used to refer to adult male prison inmates in the Texas Department of Corrections for prisoners who would mimic an escape to be hunted down by prison bloodhounds and mounted guards as a training exercise. The bloodhounds in Texas have been considered to be the best for at least the last century by various government agencies and search and rescue organizations. More recently, the term inmate kennel men has been used as a substitute for the term. During the 1800s, inmates who handled the dogs were known as dawg boys. In some cases, the exercise was cited to be carried out for the "entertainment for the guards and their guests," which has drawn controversy over the practice. This was covered in The New York Times.

== History ==
In the 1890s, Charles Favor stated that "the state keeps bloodhounds, at all times, at a convenient point; and in the event a convict escapes, they put it on the culprit's trail. It is very difficult to elude the dogs and should they be catch a convict their viciousness is extreme." In 1928, Beecher Deason, an escaped prisoner attempted to evade the dogs through various tactics, but stated that "pretty soon I heard the dog's on my trail." Deason recalled how "the guards had a habit of letting the dogs chew an escaped prisoner when they caught him." Deason escaped on that day, but was recaptured later.

== Media ==
A movie entitled Dogboys, a 1998 American-Canadian made-for-television action-thriller film directed by Ken Russell and starring Dean Cain, Tia Carrere and Bryan Brown was originally broadcast on Showtime on April 4, 1998. In the film, Julian (played by Cain) is a convict assigned by the sadistic Captain Brown to be a dog boy – a human guinea pig used to train attack dogs to hunt down potential escapees. Russell states that he was given orders to revisions by "anonymous" execs on the film: "It was change this, alter that – no discussion, 'just do it.' There was no one to talk to... It paid the rent."
