= The Big House (2001 film) =

- Directed by: Rachel Ward
- Written by: Rachel Ward
- Produced by: Bryan Brown
- Starring: Tony Martin; Gary Sweet
- Cinematography: Toby Oliver
- Edited by: Margaret Sixel
- Music by: Paul Kelly
- Release date: 18 October 2001 (U.S.)
- Running time: 24 minutes
- Country: Australia
- Language: English

The Big House is a 2001 award-winning short drama film written and directed by Rachel Ward. Set in a prison, it stars Tony Martin and Gary Sweet. It was shown at the 2001 Reel Affirmations International Gay and Lesbian Film Festival.

== Plot ==
Williams (Tony Martin) is a long-term prisoner when Sonny (Kick Gurry) comes and is assigned to be Williams' cellmate.

Williams decides to take Sonny under his wing, but his help and protection is conditional that Sonny occasionally has nonpenetrative sex with him – masturbation or oral sex. Sonny is repulsed by this.

Sonny notices a photo of a boy above Williams' bunk. Williams says that the boy in the photo is his son, and is probably a grown man by now. Williams has had no contact with his son for many years.

In the shower block, Sonny is confronted with the prospect of male rape by another long-term prisoner Jacko (Gary Sweet). Sonny then accepts Williams' protection.

Sonny does his time and then thanks Williams for looking out for him during his prison stay.

Williams is assigned a new cellmate, and unbeknownst to him that apparently it is Anthony, his own son... with the prospect that Williams will likewise 'protect' him during his prison stay.

== Cast ==
- Tony Martin as Williams
- Gary Sweet as Jacko
- Kick Gurry as Sonny
- Paul Pantano as Anthony
- Shay Lawrence as Prisoner

== Awards ==
In 2001 the film won the Australian Film Institute award for Best Short Fiction Film and was nominated for Best Screenplay. In 2002 it won the Film Critics Circle of Australia award for Best Short.
