= David McMillan (photographer) =

Canadian photographer (born 1945)

- Born: 1945; Dundee, Scotland
- Education: M.F.A. in painting from the University of Wisconsin-Madison (1973)
- Known for: photographer of the Chernobyl disaster

David McMillan (born in 1945) is a Winnipeg photographer who has photographed the 1986 Chernobyl disaster 22 times over 30 years, starting in 1994.

== Early life and career ==
McMillan was born in Dundee, Scotland in 1945. In 1951 he emigrated with his family to the United States. He originally studied to be a painter and received an M.F.A. in painting from the University of Wisconsin-Madison in 1973. The same year, he began teaching painting and drawing at the School of Art at the University of Manitoba, then became interested in photography and in 1977 established its photography program in which he taught until he retired in 2013.

== Work ==
McMillan first explored painting, particularly portraits which he painted full-size. In 1977, he changed mediums to photography and in his work as a photographer explored the interaction and tensions between nature and architecture. In 1994, he travelled to Ukraine to photograph "The Zone" – the area affected by the 1986 Chernobyl disaster – and the visit inspired him with a visual story that lasted through 22 visits to the area for the next 30 years. Remembering Nevil Shute's On the Beach (1957), McMillan discovered in Pripyat, the abandoned city closest to the reactor, grim annals of decay and growth - and beauty as nature took over the site. In 2016, McMillan spoke about the environmental disaster, saying the "growth seems incredible". He has also said,

"It was also an event so dark, so complex and with so many ramifications that we are still collectively processing it".

In 2018, the monograph on his Chernobyl work, Growth and Decay: Pripyat and the Chernobyl Exclusion Zone, was published. It was accompanied by McMillan's first full-fledged retrospective in 2019 at the Oakland University Art Gallery, Rochester, Maryland titled McMillan's Chernobyl: An Intimation of the Way the World Would End curated by Claude Baillargeon.

In 2017, McMillan returned to painting full-size, detailed portraits, often of former academic colleagues and friends. His prints are represented by the Martha Street Gallery in Winnipeg.

== Selected exhibitions ==
McMillan has had his work exhibited in more than 30 solo exhibitions and 43 group exhibitions.

- 2005: Disaster Topographics Gallery TPW, Toronto
- 2014: Shine a Light, the National Gallery of Canada, Canadian Biennial
- 2017: Photography in Canada 1960–2000 exhibition, National Gallery of Canada
- 2019: McMillan's Chernobyl: An Intimation of the Way the World Would End, major retrospective, Oakland University Art Gallery, Rochester, Maryland.

== Selected public collections ==
- National Gallery of Canada
- Art Gallery of Ontario
- Milwaukee Art Museum
- Winnipeg Art Gallery
