= On the Beach (novel) =

1957 Nevil Shute novel

- First edition cover
- Author: Nevil Shute
- Cover artist: John Rowland
- Language: English
- Genre: Dying Earth
- Publisher: Heinemann
- Publication date: 1957
- Media type: Print (hardcover and paperback)
- Pages: 312 pp
- Text: On the Beach online

On the Beach is an apocalyptic novel published in 1957, written by British author Nevil Shute after he immigrated to Australia. The novel details the experiences of a mixed group of people in Melbourne as they await the arrival of deadly radiation spreading towards them from the Northern Hemisphere, following a nuclear war some years previously. As the radiation approaches, each person deals with impending death differently.

Shute's initial story was published as a four-part series, The Last Days on Earth, in the London weekly periodical Sunday Graphic, in April 1957. For the novel, Shute expanded the storyline. The story has been adapted twice as a film (in 1959 and 2000) and once as a BBC Radio broadcast in 2008.

== Title ==
The phrase "on the beach" is a Royal Navy term that indicates retirement from service. The title also refers to T. S. Eliot's poem The Hollow Men, which includes the lines:

In this last of meeting places
We grope together
And avoid speech
Gathered on this beach of the tumid river.

Printings of the novel, including the first 1957 edition by William Morrow and Company, New York, contain extracts from Eliot's poem on the title page, under Shute's name, including the above quotation and the concluding lines:

This is the way the world ends
Not with a bang but a whimper.

== Plot ==
It is 1963, and the setting is Australia. In the previous year, a short nuclear war had erupted, devastating most of the populated world, polluting the atmosphere with nuclear fallout, and killing all human and animal life in the Northern Hemisphere. The war began with a nuclear attack by Albania on Israel. Egypt attacked the United States and the United Kingdom attacked Egypt. That sparked war between NATO and the Soviet Union, after which the Soviets and China destroyed each other. Some 4,000 cobalt and other "superbombs" were detonated.

Global air currents are slowly carrying the lethal nuclear fallout across the Intertropical Convergence Zone to the Southern Hemisphere. The only parts of the planet still habitable are Australia, New Zealand, South Africa, and the southern parts of South America. However, they are slowly succumbing to radiation poisoning as well. Australia now has eight months to live. Short of oil, automobiles, and newsprint, Australians "meander through a fatalistic existence that has suddenly lost meaning."

People in Australia detect a mysterious and incomprehensible Morse code-like radio signal originating from the American city of Seattle, Washington. With hope that someone has survived in the contaminated regions, one of the last American nuclear submarines, USS Scorpion, placed by its captain, Commander Dwight Towers, under Australian naval command, is ordered to sail north from its port of refuge in Melbourne (Australia's southernmost major mainland city) to contact whoever is sending the signal. In preparation for this journey, the submarine makes a shorter trip to port cities in northern Australia, including Cairns, Queensland, Port Moresby in Papua New Guinea, and Darwin, Northern Territory; no survivors are found. Two Australians sail with the American crew: Lieutenant Peter Holmes, a naval liaison officer to the Americans, and Professor John Osborne, a scientist.

Commander Towers has become attached to Moira Davidson, a young Australian woman distantly related to Osborne, who tries to cope with the impending end of human life through heavy drinking. Despite his attraction to Davidson, Towers remains loyal to his wife and children in the United States. He buys his children gifts and imagines them growing older. At one point, however, he makes it clear to Moira that he knows his family is almost certainly dead, and asks if she thinks he is insane for acting as if they were still alive. She replies that she does not think he is crazy.

The Australian government provides citizens with free suicide pills and injections to avoid prolonged suffering from radiation poisoning. Periodic reports show the steady southward progression of the deadly radiation. As communications are lost with a city, it is referred to as being "out."

Peter Holmes has a baby daughter and a wife, Mary. Mary is in denial about the impending disaster. Because he has been assigned to travel north with the Americans, Peter tries to explain, to Mary's fury and disbelief, how to kill their baby and herself, by taking the pill, should he not return from his mission in time to help. The bachelor Osborne spends much of his time restoring and subsequently racing a Ferrari racing car (the Ferrari 246 F1 used by Luigi Musso to win the 1958 Syracuse Grand Prix) that he had purchased (along with a fuel supply) for a nominal amount following the war's outbreak.

USS Scorpion travels to the Gulf of Alaska in the northern Pacific Ocean, where the crew determines that radiation levels are not decreasing. This finding discredits the "Jorgensen Effect", a scientific theory positing that radiation levels will decrease at a greater rate than previously thought, aided by the weather effects, and potentially allow for human life to continue in southern Australia or Antarctica. The submarine approaches San Francisco, observing through the periscope that the city had been devastated and the Golden Gate Bridge has fallen. In contrast, the Puget Sound area, from which the radio signals are emanating, is found to have avoided destruction because of missile defences. One crew member, from Edmonds, Washington, where the expedition visits, jumps ship to spend his last days in his hometown.

The expedition members then sail to an abandoned navy communications school south of Seattle. A crewman sent ashore with oxygen tanks and protective gear discovers that although the city's residents have long since perished, some of the region's hydroelectric power is still working due to primitive automation technology. He finds that the mysterious radio signal is caused by a broken window sash swinging in the breeze and occasionally hitting a telegraph key. After a stop at Pearl Harbor, the remaining submariners return to Australia to live out what little time they have left.

Osborne takes his suicide pill while sitting in his Ferrari. When Mary becomes very ill, Peter administers a lethal injection to their daughter. Despite Peter feeling relatively well, he and Mary take their pills simultaneously to die as a family. Towers and his remaining crew choose to scuttle the Scorpion in the open ocean, fulfilling a naval duty not to leave the unmanned vessel "floating about in a foreign port", after her crew succumbs to suicide or radiation poisoning. Moira watches the submarine's departure in her car, parked atop an adjacent hilltop, as she takes her pill, imagining herself together with Towers as she dies.

== Characterisation ==
The characters make their best efforts to enjoy what time remains to them, speaking of small pleasures and continuing their customary activities. The Holmeses plant a garden that they will never see; Moira initially acts as a socialite – drinking and partying excessively – but upon meeting Towers takes classes in typing and shorthand; Osborne and others organize a dangerous motor race that results in the violent deaths of several participants; elderly members of a gentlemen's club drink up the wine in the club's cellar, debate over whether to move the fishing season up, and fret about whether agriculturally destructive rabbits will survive human beings. Towers goes on a fishing trip with Moira Davidson but they do not become intimate, as he chooses to remain loyal to his dead wife, a decision Moira accepts.

Government services and the economy gradually grind to a halt, and the societal breakdown depicted is generally amiable. In the end, Towers chooses not to remain and die with Moira, but rather to lead his crew on a final mission to scuttle the submarine outside of Australian territorial waters. He refuses to allow his imminent demise to turn him aside from his duty to the US Navy, and he acts as a pillar of strength to his crew.

Typically for a Shute novel, the characters avoid expressing intense emotions and do not indulge in self-pity. The Australians do not, for the most part, flee southward as refugees but rather accept their fate once the lethal radiation levels reach the latitudes at which they live; most of them opt for the government-promoted alternative of suicide when the symptoms of radiation sickness appear. In any case, as is made clear within the text, radiation poisoning is also starting to appear as far south as Christchurch, New Zealand, so any such flight would ultimately have been pointless.

== Reception ==
Historian David McCullough, writing for The New York Times, called On the Beach "the most haunting evocation we have of a world dying of radiation after an atomic war." The San Francisco Chronicle called it "the most shocking fiction I have read in years. What is shocking about it is both the idea and the sheer imaginative brilliance with which Mr. Shute brings it off." Daily Telegraph called it "Shute's most considerable achievement", and The Times stated that it is "the most evocative novel on the aftermath of a nuclear war." The Guardian commented that "fictions such as On the Beach played an important role in raising awareness about the threat of nuclear war. We stared into the abyss and then stepped back from the brink." The Los Angeles Times described the novel as "timely and ironic... an indelibly sad ending that leaves you tearful and disturbed", and The Economist called it "still incredibly moving after nearly half a century."

Floyd C. Gale of Galaxy Science Fiction called the book "an emotional wallop. It should be made mandatory reading for all professional diplomats and politicians." Isaac Asimov said, "Surely to the science fiction fan—as opposed to the general public—this must seem very milk-and-watery. So there's a nuclear war to start the story with—and what else is new?" He described the novel as an example of what he called "'tomorrow fiction'", and "there can be nothing duller than tomorrow's headlines in science fiction".

The novel does not realistically describe the effects of a global nuclear war, which were poorly understood at the time. It does not portray any form of nuclear winter. In the survival manual Nuclear War Survival Skills, Cresson Kearney describes the novel as "pseudoscientific" and "demoralizing", arguing that it and similar works perpetuate the myth that any large-scale nuclear war would inevitably wipe out all human life. This myth, argues Kearney, is dangerous as it discourages people from taking precautionary measures that could save lives in the event of a nuclear attack, in the mistaken belief that any precaution is futile.

== Adaptations ==
- On the Beach (1959 film) is a feature film starring Gregory Peck, Ava Gardner, and Fred Astaire.
- On the Beach (2000 film) is a made-for-television film starring Armand Assante, Rachel Ward, and Bryan Brown.
- Classic Serial: On the Beach (November 2008), BBC Radio 4 broadcast a full-cast audio dramatization in two hour-long episodes, as part of their Classic Serial strand.
- On the Beach (2023 theatre production), a play adapted by artistic director Kip Williams and playwright Tommy Murphy for the Sydney Theatre Company.

== See also ==
- 1957 in science fiction
- "Dancing with Tears in My Eyes", a 1984 song by Ultravox, which was inspired by the novel
- "Every Day is Like Sunday", a 1988 song by Morrissey, which was inspired by the novel
- The Last Ship, a 1988 novel with similar themes
- Death Stranding 2: On the Beach, a 2025 video game that takes place in a post-apocalyptic Australia and features a submarine-like vehicle
