= A Difficult Woman =

Australian television series

A Difficult Woman is an Australian television series which screened in 1998 on the ABC. The four part series starred Caroline Goodall, in the title role of a woman whose best friend is murdered and is determined to find out why. It was written by Nicholas Hammond and Steven Vidler and directed by Tony Tilse. Simon Hughes of the Age wrote "That is the quibble about A Difficult Woman. That in seeking to cover all bases, it overeggs the pudding. For all that, it is impressive."

== Cast ==
- Caroline Goodall as Dr. Anne Harriman
- Peter Feeney as Dave Gutteridge
- Martin Jacobs as Tom Ferrars
- Nicholas Eadie as Peter McFarlane
- Victoria Longley as Giselle McKenzie
- Jim Moriarty as Dominic Martin
- Bill Hunter as Paul Scanlon
- Anna Lise Phillips as Cassie
- Sarah Kants as Penny Ferrars
- Ellen Cressey as Melissa Bertram
- Rosey Jones as Rachel Levin
- Tara Morice as Susan Taylor
- Bille Brown as Howard
- Julia Blake as Mrs. McKenzie
- Steve Le Marquand as Snuff
- Alastair Duncan as Honore De Grasset

== See also ==
- List of Australian television series
