= An Accidental Soldier =

- DVD cover
- Based on: Silent Parts by John Charalambous
- Written by: Blake Ayshford
- Screenplay by: John Charalambous
- Directed by: Rachel Ward
- Starring: Marie Bunel; Dan Spielman; Julia Zemiro; Bryan Brown
- Country of origin: Australia
- Original languages: English; French (with subtitles)

Production
- Producers: David Ogilvy; Greg Waters; Ben Grant; Sue Taylor; Kylie du Fresne; Susie Campbell
- Cinematography: Germain McMicking
- Editor: Leanne Cole
- Running time: 91 minutes
- Production companies: Goalpost Pictures; Taylor Media

Original release
- Network: ABC
- Release: 15 September 2013

An Accidental Soldier is an Australian television drama film produced by Goalpost Pictures, released on 15 September 2013, and starring Marie Bunel, Dan Spielman, Julia Zemiro, and Bryan Brown. It is written by Blake Ayshford from the screenplay of John Charalambous, who based it on his 2008 book Silent Parts. The film was directed by Rachel Ward and was shot just outside Perth, Western Australia.

== Plot summary ==
Harry Lambert (Dan Spielman) is a timid 35-year-old Australian baker who is shamed by his rural neighbours to join the 1st AIF and fight in the Western Front of World War I. Behind the lines, he continues to bake bread but when they are called up to fight, Harry realises he doesn't want to kill and leaves the battlefield. In the countryside, deserters are being trailed; he barely avoids capture when Colombe Jacotot (Marie Bunel) finds him.

She is a quiet farm-wife, who has faced the horrors of war: the death of her son and her husband abandoning her. Neither knows the other's language but they quickly find themselves unexpectedly in love. She teaches him about true courage; he shows her beauty in a life that she thought was over.

== Cast ==
- Dan Spielman as Harry Lambert
- Marie Bunel as Colombe Jacotot
- Julia Zemiro as Isabelle
- Bryan Brown as Captain Foster
- Malcolm Kennard as Captain Humphries
- Christian Manon

== Production ==
Director Rachel Ward requested an unnamed Australian actress for the French-speaking Colombe. However, a French casting director gave Marie Bunel's name to the producers. She auditioned via Skype and Ward looked no further. "You can't pretend that Frenchness," Ward said, "even if somebody speaks very good French. There is incredible honesty and charm to [Bunel's] performance." Melburnian Julia Zemiro plays Colombe's friend and neighbour, Isabelle. Zemiro was born in France and emigrated to Australia as a child. She speaks French fluently and this is her first major French-speaking role. Ward's husband Bryan Brown plays Captain Foster. This is the first collaboration for the couple since the 2009 film Beautiful Kate.

CGI erased power lines and houses in post-production, recreating the French countryside in Western Australia. Producer Sue Taylor stated, "There is a six-week window after the winter rains in the spring where we do look a little like France. I always felt we could do it."

== Reception ==
=== Critical reception ===
Graeme Blundell of The Australian stated, "[Blake] Ayshford, in taking the colonial part of the novel, which interweaves events from 1968 and fading memories of the war with events from 1918, also provides a hushed story of an unlikely love. Adaptations into film are difficult to manage. But Ayshford and his sympathetic director have created something quite singular and filmically exciting."

=== Accolades ===
In 2013, An Accidental Soldier received six AACTA Award nominations, including Best Telefeature, Mini Series or Short Run Series, Best Direction in a Drama or Comedy for Rachel Ward, and Best Lead Actress in a Television Drama for Marie Bunel. The film was also nominated for an AWGIE Award for Telemovie: Adaptation for Blake Ayshford.
