= Lisa Hensley (actress) =

Australian actress

- Born: Sydney, New South Wales, Australia

Comedy career
- Years active: 1987–present
- Medium: Actress, television personality

Lisa Hensley is an Australian actress who first came to prominence with a leading role in the television mini-series Brides of Christ. She went to high school at Brigidine College, St Ives, Sydney, New South Wales, Australia.

Hensley has also appeared in A Country Practice, 15 Amore, Sons and Daughters, The Flying Doctors, Dating the Enemy, Farscape as Matala, Two Twisted, and All Saints. She later presented the "From the Heart" program on Qantas airline's inflight ON-Q Radio.

== Filmography ==
=== Film ===
Year	Title	Role	Type	Ref
1987	The Umbrella Woman (aka The Good Wife)	Sylvia	Feature film	
1988	The 13th Floor	Heather Thompson	Feature film	
1992	Greenkeeping	Sue	Feature film	
1994	Ebbtide	Beth	Feature film	
1995	The Feds: Vengeance	Annie Fleming	TV movie	
1996	Dating the Enemy	Laetitia	Feature film	
1996	Mr. Reliable	Penny Wilbeforce	Feature film	
1997	Paradise Road	Edna	Feature film	
1998	15 Amore	Dorothy	Feature film	
1998	Replay	Voice	Short film	
2000	Tackle Happy	Self	Documentary film	
2003	Martha's New Coat	Sarah	Short film	
2004	Big Reef	Charlene	TV movie	
2006	Afterlife	Roxanne	Short film	
2006	Hold Please	Jane	Short film	
2006	Last Train to Freo	Train Announcer (voice)	Feature film	
2007	Razzle Dazzle: A Journey into Dance	Harridan woman (uncredited)	Feature film	
2010	How God Works	Mother	Short film	
2014	A Priest in the Family	Margaret	Short film	
2019	Palm Beach	Lorna	Feature film	
2020	Penguin Bloom	Bron	Feature film	

=== Television ===
Year	Title	Role	Type	Ref
1986	Game of Life	Reporter	TV series, 8 episodes	
1987	Sons and Daughters	Michelle White	TV series, 11 episodes	
1987-92	A Country Practice	Samantha Irving / Rhonda Haddon / Michelle Carson	TV series, 7 episodes	
1988	All the Way	Christine Scott	TV series, 3 episodes	
1989	Shadow of the Cobra	Lizzy	TV miniseries, 2 episodes	
1990	Shadows of the Heart	Jillian Hughes	TV miniseries, 2 episodes	
1991	The Flying Doctors	Gaby	TV series, 1 episode	
1991	Brides of Christ	Sister Paul / Veronica	TV miniseries, 6 episodes	
1993-99	Law of the Land	Kate Chalmers	TV series, 50 episodes	
1997	Good Guys, Bad Guys	Dorothy O'Malley	TV series, 1 episode: "Unfinished Business"	
1999	Farscape	Matala	TV series, 1 episode	
2000	The Big Schmooze	Self	TV series, 1 episode	
2001	All Saints	Anne Trelawney	TV series, 1 episode	
2006	Two Twisted	Annabel	TV miniseries, 1 episode	
2007-08	The Movie Show	Presenter	TV series	
2012	Dance Academy	Lena	TV series, 1 episode	
2013	Mr & Mrs Murder	Yvette Nailor	TV series, 1 episode	
2014	Lessons from the Grave	Lottery Woman	TV series, 20 episodes	
	The Know	Host	TV series	
2014-18	Black Comedy	Guest actor	TV series, 7 episodes	
2015	Wonderland	Vanessa	TV series, 1 episode	
2015	Let's Talk About	Anne Hardliner	TV miniseries, 10 episodes	
2019	My Life Is Murder	Chef Brenda Levine	TV series, 1 episode	
2024	Total Control	Sharon Costigan	TV series, 6 episodes	
2025	Darby and Joan	Maxine Nelson	TV series: 2 episodes	

=== Radio ===
Year	Title	Role	Type
	From the Heart	Presenter	Qantas airlines's inflight ON-Q Radio
