= On the Beach (2000 film) =

- DVD cover
- Genre: Science fiction; Drama
- Based on: On the Beach by John Paxton; On the Beach by Nevil Shute
- Teleplay by: David Williamson; Bill Kerby
- Directed by: Russell Mulcahy
- Starring: Armand Assante; Rachel Ward; Bryan Brown; Jacqueline McKenzie; Grant Bowler
- Music by: Christopher Gordon
- Countries of origin: United States; Australia
- Original language: English

Production
- Executive producers: Errol Sullivan; Jeffrey Hayes; Greg Coote
- Producers: John Edwards; Errol Sullivan
- Cinematography: Martin McGrath
- Editor: Mark Perry
- Running time: 195 minutes
- Production companies: Southern Star Entertainment; Edwards/Sullivan Productions; Coote Hayes Productions

Original release
- Network: Showtime
- Release: 28 May 2000

On the Beach is a 2000 apocalyptic drama television film directed by Russell Mulcahy and starring Armand Assante, Bryan Brown, and Rachel Ward. In America, it aired on Showtime on 28 May 2000 and in Australia it aired on Channel 7.

The film is a remake of a 1959 film, which was also based on the 1957 novel by Nevil Shute, but updates the setting of the story to the film's then-future of 2006, starting with placing the crew on a fictional Los Angeles-class submarine, USS Charleston (SSN-704).

== Plot ==
USS Charleston (SSN-704) is equipped with a caterpillar drive and is on station following a nuclear exchange, under the command of Dwight Towers.

A devastating war that contaminated the northern hemisphere was preceded by a standoff between the United States and China after the latter blockaded and later invaded Taiwan. Both countries are destroyed, as is most of the world. The submarine crew finds refuge in Melbourne, Australia, which the radioactive fallout has not yet reached (though radio communications with several radio operators farther north than Australia indicate that radiation has reached their countries and will be in Australia in a few months). Towers places his vessel under the command of the Royal Australian Navy and is summoned to attend a briefing, partly regarding an automated digital broadcast coming from Alaska in the Northern Hemisphere. The submarine is sent to investigate, with Towers, Australian scientist Julian Osborne, and Australian liaison officer Peter Holmes on board.

Upon reaching Alaska, Towers and his executive officer go ashore to find no survivors. Entering a house and seeing a dead family huddled on a bed, Towers thinks of his own family and what they must have endured. The source of the automated digital broadcast is traced to a television station whose broadcast, Towers and his executive officer discover, comes from a solar-powered laptop trying to broadcast a documentary via satellite. While in Alaska, Towers' executive officer accidentally punctures his suit and injures his leg, but conceals the injury from Towers.

Instead of returning directly to Melbourne, Towers orders the submarine to San Francisco where most of the crew originated. The Golden Gate Bridge has collapsed and the city shoreline is in ruins. A crew member who is from San Francisco abandons ship, planning on dying in his home city, and is left by his shipmates after it is argued that the length of time he has spent outside has already made him irreversibly sick with radiation poisoning.

Upon the Charleston's return to Melbourne, the executive officer collapses and is diagnosed with terminal radiation sickness. Towers attends to his old friend in his dying days and ultimately, at his request, euthanizes the man as his deteriorating condition causes him to experience extreme suffering. Towers returns to Moira Davidson, Holmes's sister-in-law and Osborne's ex-fiancée.

As the people of Melbourne realize that the inevitable nuclear cloud will soon reach their location, their impending doom begins to unravel the social fabric; anarchy and chaos erupt. (This is in contrast to the 1959 film, in which most of the populace accepts their fate with grim resignation.)

When radiation sickness appears in Melbourne, people begin lining up for government-issued suicide medication. After Mary and their small daughter Jenny fall ill, Peter and his family share a final moment before taking their doses together, Peter sorrowfully injecting his child.

Osborne races around the Phillip Island Grand Prix Circuit and finally crashes his car at Turn 10, resulting in a fiery death. With most of the Charleston's crew members developing advanced radiation sickness, they ask to take the submarine on one final voyage to San Francisco. Though they know they are unlikely to survive the trip, they wish to die together on the Charleston, the only real home they have left. Towers agrees, apparently abandoning Moira to be with his men. As Moira, about to take her own suicide pill, watches the Charleston sail away, she is joined by Towers after all. Although it is not depicted onscreen, it is implied that Towers and Moira will later take their suicide pills together, given that there is no possibility of survival.

== Cast ==
Major characters

- Armand Assante as Captain Lionel Dwight Towers
- Rachel Ward as Moira Davidson
- Bryan Brown as Dr. Julian Osborne
- Jacqueline McKenzie as Mary Holmes
- Grant Bowler as Lieutenant Peter Holmes
- Steve Bastoni as First Officer Neil Hirsch
- David Paterson as Chief Wawrzeniak
- Kevin Copeland as Sonarman Bobby Swain
- Todd MacDonald as Radioman Giles
- Joe Petruzzi as Lieutenant Tony Garcia
- Rod Mullinar as Admiral Jack Cunningham
- Bill Hunter as Prime Minister Seaton
- Charles Tingwell as Professor Alan Nordstrum

Secondary cast

- Allison & Tieghan Webber as Jenny Holmes
- Craig Beamer as Crewman Reid
- Jonathan Oldham as Crewman Parsons
- Trent Huen as Crewman Samuel Huynh
- Donni Frizzell as Crewman Rossi
- Jonathan Stuart as Crewman Burns
- Sam Loy as Seaman Sulman
- Charlie Clausen as Seaman Byers
- Robert Rabiah as Cook Gratino
- Marc Carra as Cook Walmsey
- Felicity Boyd as Lieutenant Ashton
- Mark Mitchell as Reg
- John Higginson as Martin
- Kate Kendall as Jenny Albani
- Heather Mitchell as British Anchorwoman
- Nicholas Hammond as US President
- Bruce Hughes as Press Secretary
- David Tredinnick as US Analyst
- Alyce Platt as Sharon Towers
- David Argue as Jimmy Nofly
- Catherine Sutherland as Nurse
- Marty Copping as Beans

== Production ==
In the film, the Morse code signal picked up by the submarine crew in the original novel and film was updated to an automated digital broadcast powered by a solar-powered laptop computer. The film's picture of human behaviour is darker and more pessimistic than in the original 1959 adaptation, in which social order and manners do not collapse.

Alterations from the book and original film adaptation are made, including an ending differing from both the novel and film in that the submarine commander chooses to die with his newfound love instead of scuttling the submarine beyond Australian territorial waters (as in the novel) or attempting to return with his crew to the United States (as in the earlier film). In this version, the Golden Gate Bridge has collapsed and the city shoreline is in ruins, indicating an adjacent nuclear detonation, as in the book but not the first film version. The film ends with the reunion of Towers and Moira while their implied suicides occur offscreen, as did the original version of Moira in the first film. Unlike the first film, there is no final postmortem scene of deserted Melbourne streets, with the absence of human life depicted.

The film contains various technical errors, such as in military uniforms and terminology.

The film ends with a quotation from Walt Whitman's poem "On The Beach at Night", describing how frightening an approaching cloud bank seemed at night to the poet's child, blotting the stars out one by one, as the father and child stood on the beach on Massachusetts' North Shore. As much as it resembles the plot of the movie and of Shute's novel, however, the book gives only an incidental reference to the Whitman poem, and the phrase "on the beach" is a Royal Navy term that means "retired from the Service". However, there seems to be little doubt about the provenance of the book's title, since at least some editions of it bear on the flyleaf two stanzas from the T.S. Eliot poem "The Hollow Men":

In this last of meeting places / We grope together / And avoid speech / Gathered on this beach of the tumid river.

This is the way the world ends / This is the way the world ends / This is the way the world ends / Not with a bang but a whimper.

== Reception ==
The film received mixed reviews because with its three-hour account of impending doom, reviewers considered it "slow going". In contrast, the 1959 version of the film was 2 hours, 14 minutes.

Some film reviewers still found aspects to praise, however. Richard Scheib, the Science Fiction, Horror and Fantasy Film Review critic, saw the film as benefiting from the lengthier timeline: "The mini-series certainly has the luxury to pad the story out and tell it with more length than the film did. As a result there is a greater degree of emotional resonance to the characters than the 1959 film had ... Mostly the mini-series works satisfyingly as a romantic drama, which it does reasonably depending on the extent to which one enjoys these things. Crucially though the mini-series does manage to work as science fiction and Russell Mulcahy delivers some impressive images of the aftermath of the nuclear holocaust. There are some fine scenes with Armand Assante and the submarine crew walking through the ruins of Anchorage discovering how the people there committed suicide en masse, and some excellent digital effects during the periscope tour of the ruins of San Francisco".

On the Beach received a Golden Globe award nomination for Best Miniseries or Television Film. Rachel Ward received a Golden Globe award nomination for the Best Performance by an Actress in a Mini-Series or Motion Picture Made for Television category for her role as Moira Davidson.

== Bibliography ==
- Shute, Nevil. On The Beach. New York: William Morrow and Company, 1989, First edition 1957. ISBN 9780345311481.
