= Dogboys =

1998 American television film

- Genre: Action; Thriller
- Written by: Rob Stork; David Taylor
- Directed by: Ken Russell
- Starring: Dean Cain; Tia Carrere; Bryan Brown; Sean McCann
- Music by: John Altman
- Country of origin: United States
- Original language: English

Production
- Executive producers: Hugh Martin; Rob Stork
- Producers: Ken Russell; Christopher Courtney
- Cinematography: Jamie Thompson
- Editor: Xavier Russell
- Running time: 92 minutes
- Production company: Goodstuff Entertainment

Original release
- Network: Showtime
- Release: April 4, 1998

Dogboys is a 1998 American-Canadian made-for-television action-thriller film directed by Ken Russell and starring Dean Cain, Tia Carrere and Bryan Brown. It was originally broadcast on Showtime on April 4, 1998.

== Plot ==
Julian is a convict assigned by the sadistic Captain Brown to be a "dog boy"—a human guinea pig used to train attack dogs to hunt down potential escapees.

== Cast ==
- Dean Cain as Julian Taylor
- Tia Carrere as D.A. Jennifer Dern
- Bryan Brown as Captain Robert Brown
- Sean McCann as Pappy

== Production ==
The film was shot in Toronto in May 1997.

Russell said he was given orders to revisions by "anonymous" execs on the film. "It was change this, alter that – no discussion, 'just do it.' There was no one to talk to... It paid the rent."

== Reception ==
The Los Angeles Times said "Dialogue is deliriously silly, with the term "dogboy" used so frequently you'd think they're trying to make it a national catch-phrase."
