= The Death and Life of Otto Bloom =

- Theatrical film poster
- Directed by: Cris Jones
- Written by: Cris Jones
- Produced by: Melanie Coombs; Alicia Brown; Mish Armstrong
- Starring: Xavier Samuel; Rachel Ward; Matilda Brown
- Cinematography: László Baranyai
- Edited by: Bill Murphy
- Music by: Paul Gillett
- Production company: Optimism
- Distributed by: Bonsai Films
- Release date: July 28, 2016
- Running time: 84 minutes
- Country: Australia
- Language: English

The Death and Life of Otto Bloom is a 2016 Australian mockumentary drama film written and directed by Cris Jones, starring Xavier Samuel, Rachel Ward and Matilda Brown. The film is produced by Alicia Brown, Mish Armstrong and Melanie Coombs.

The film had its premiere at, and opened, the 65th Melbourne International Film Festival on 28 July 2016.

== Plot ==
The chronicle of the life and great love of Otto Bloom, a man who experiences time in reverse.

== Cast ==
- Xavier Samuel as Otto Bloom
- Rachel Ward as Dr. Ada Fitzgerald
  - Matilda Brown as Young Ada Fitzgerald
- Rose Riley as Suzi Noon
- Terry Camilleri as Bob Simkin
  - Jason Agius as Young Bob Simkin
- Amber Clayton as Nora Baron
- Jacek Koman as Miroslaw Kotok
- Tyler Coppin as J.C. Tippit
- Suzy Cato-Gashler as Nell Allen
- John Gaden as Prof. Charles Reinier
- Richard Cawthorne as Duane Renaud

== Production ==
=== Development ===
Jones cites Albert Einstein's perspective of time as a source of inspiration for the film, explaining "that the perception we are moving forward through time is an illusion. Time is just another dimension of the physical universe, and every moment is therefore simultaneously real... It was a fascinating idea and a powerful philosophy for me, because there's a lot of consolation that comes with it. I was looking for a story in which you could take this philosophy and a positive message and tell it as a film. The idea of how to do it came several years later."

=== Filming ===
The film was shot in January 2016 in and around Melbourne.

== Release ==
The Death and Life of Otto Bloom premiered at, and opened, the 65th Melbourne International Film Festival on 28 July 2016.

== Reception ==
The film holds a 56% approval rating on Rotten Tomatoes based on 9 reviews by critics.

In her review for the Daily telegraph, Vicky Roach described the film as a "budget time-travelling romance" that "boggles with sheer ingenuity." The Guardian awarded the film 3/5 stars, calling it "refreshingly unpredictable, a particularly pleasing virtue in these dark days of superhero this and sequel that." Craig Mathieson of the Sydney Morning Herald praised the film, stating: "Cris Jones' debut feature is that rare thing: a mock documentary that reaches a genuine emotional depth." In particular, he welcomed Ward's return to screen, writing, "it's a remarkable performance: unassuming but wrenchingly powerful". Sarah Ward of Screen Daily was less impressed, writing "it is never as substantial, involving, or convincing as it aims to be".

=== Accolades ===
Jones was posthumously honoured with the Australian Writers' Guild's $10,000 John Hinde Award for Excellence in Science-Fiction Writing in 2017.

Award	Category	Subject	Result
AACTA Awards (7th)	Best Original Screenplay	Cris Jones	Nominated
AACTA Awards (7th)	Best Production Design	Ben Morieson	Nominated
Beijing International Film Festival	Tiantian Award for Best Picture	Mish Armstrong, Alicia Brown, Melanie Coombs	Nominated
Beijing International Film Festival	Tiantian Award for Best Visual Effects	Raynor Pettge	Won
CinefestOz	Film Prize Finalist	Cris Jones	Nominated
Cleveland International Film Festival	New Direction Competition	Cris Jones	Nominated
Imagine Film Festival	Black Tulip for Best Feature Film	Cris Jones	Nominated
