= 46th AWGIE Awards =

Award ceremony for writing of 2012

The 46th Annual AWGIE Awards, which is conducted by the Australian Writers' Guild, honors the best in Australian writing for screen, television, stage and radio. It was held at the Plaza Ballroom in Melbourne, Victoria, Australia on 4 October 2013, and was hosted by comedian Sammy J. David Williamson AO and Attorney General George Brandis were also in attendance.

Winners are highlighted in bold

== Nominees ==
=== Telemovie: Adaptation ===
- An Accidental Soldier - Blake Ayshford
- **Underground: The Julian Assange Story - Robert Connolly**

=== Television: Mini-Series Original ===
- Devil's Dust - Kris Mrksa
- **Underbelly: Badness - Nicola Aken, Peter Gawler, Felicity Packard, Jeffrey Truman**
- Underbelly: Squizzy - Peter Gawler, Andrew Muir, Felicity Packard, Jeffrey Truman

=== Television: Series ===
- Rake (R v Greene) - Peter Duncan
- Rake (R v Mohammed) - Peter Duncan
- **Rake (R v Floyd) - Andrew Knight**
- Redfern Now (Raymond) - Adrian Wills

=== Television: Serial ===
- Home and Away (5660) - Sam Atwell
- Home and Away (5616) - Louise Bowes
- **Home and Away (5714) - Gary Sewell**

=== Comedy: Sketch Or Light Entertainment ===
- **Good News Week (The Second Going) - Mat Blackwell, George Dodd, Simon Dodd, Warwick Holt, Paul Livingston, Ian Simmons**
- How Green was my Cactus - Doug Edwards, Lindy Wilson, Shane Edwards

=== Comedy: Narrative ===
- A Moody Christmas (Decapod Crustaceans) - Phil Lloyd, Trent O'Donnell
- **A Moody Christmas (Separate Seats) - Phil Lloyd, Trent O'Donnell**
- **Please Like Me (Portuguese Custard Tarts) - Josh Thomas, Liz Doran, Thomas Ward**
- Please Like Me (Spanish Eggs) - Josh Thomas, Liz Doran, Thomas Ward

=== Feature Film: Screenplay Original ===
- Felony - Joel Edgerton
- Drift - Morgan O'Neill
- **The Rocket - Kim Mordaunt**

=== Feature Film: Screenplay Adaptation ===
- A Most Wanted Man - Andrew Bovell
- **Lore - Cate Shortland, Robert Mukherjee**

=== Radio: Original ===
- **See How The Leaf People Run - Michele Lee**
- Eaten - Gina Schien

=== Radio: Adaptation ===
- **Cross Sections - Suzie Miller**
- Head Full of Love - Alana Valentine

=== Interactive Media ===
- **The Opera House Project - Sam Doust**

=== Animation ===
- **The Adventures of Figaro Pho: The Fear Of Unfamiliar Toilets - Bruce Griffiths**
- A Cautionary Tail - Erica Harrison
- Ghosts of Time: Mummy Mia - David Witt

=== Documentary: Public Broadcast ===
- Whitlam: The Power & The Passion - Paul Clarke
- Love & Fury: Judith Wright & 'Nugget' Coombs - John Hughes, Penelope Chai
- **Red Obsession - David Roach, Warwick Ross**

=== Documentary: Corporate & Trading ===
- **Your Choice - Ken Wallace**

=== Theatre For Young Audiences ===
- Tame - Declan Greene
- **Truck Stop - Lachlan Philpott**
- Driving into Walls - Suzie Miller
- The Warrior And the Princess - Shirley Van Sanden

=== Theatre: Community & Youth Theatre ===
- The Quiet Brother - Ivy Mak
- Beagle Bay Chronicles - Casey Nicholls
- **Grounded - Alana Valentine**

=== Theatre: Stage ===
- **Medea - Kate Mulvany and Anne-Louise Sarks**
- Pompeii, L.A. - Declan Greene
- Happy Ending - Melissa Reeves
- Sweetest Things - Kate Rice

=== Theatre: Children's ===
- **Starchaser - Lally Katz**
- The House that Jack Filled - Finegan Kruckemeyer

=== Short film ===
- Spine - Sophie Miller
- **The Amber Amulet - Genevieve Hegney and Matthew Moore**
- Bursting! - Gary Sewell
- The Last Time I Saw Richard - Nicholas Verso

=== Children's Television: P Classification ===
- **Guess How Much I Love You (I Promise) - David Evans**
- Guess How Much I Love You (A Hare's Tale) - Lisa Hoppe
- Guess How Much I Love You (The Big Apple) - Jane Schneider

=== Children's Television: C Classification ===
- Ghosts Of Time (Alien Adventure) - David Evans
- Dance Academy (New Rules) - Josh Mapleston
- Dance Academy (Not For Nothing) - Samantha Strauss
- **Dance Academy (A Perfect Storm) - Samantha Strauss**

=== Monte Miller Award: Long Form ===
- **Fury - Charlotte McConaghy**
- Starfish - Hannah Moon, Robin Geradts-Gill and Stephen Sholl
- The Knot - Jessica Paine

=== Monte Miller Award: Short Form ===
- **Trunk - Derek Foster**
- Drive By - Edward Lyons
- Any Given Day - Anne O'Hoy and Leah Pullen

=== David Williamson Prize ===
- **Alana Valentine**

=== Dorothy Crawford Award ===
For outstanding contribution to the profession

- **Neil Armfield**

=== Richard Lane Award ===
For outstanding service and dedication to the Australian Writers' Guild

- **Simon Hopkinson**

=== Hector Crawford Award ===
For outstanding contribution to the craft via a body of script editing work

- **Kym Goldsworthy**

=== Fred Parsons Award ===
For outstanding contribution to Australian Comedy

- **Guy Rundle**
