= Dating the Enemy =

1996 Australian comedy film

- Original release poster
- Directed by: Megan Simpson Huberman
- Written by: Megan Simpson Huberman
- Produced by: Sue Milliken; Philip Gerlach; Heather Ogilvie
- Starring: Claudia Karvan; Guy Pearce; Matt Day; Lisa Hensley; John Howard; Pippa Grandison
- Cinematography: Steve Arnold
- Edited by: Marcus D'Arcy
- Music by: David Hirschfelder
- Release date: September 19, 1996
- Running time: 97 minutes
- Country: Australia
- Language: English

Dating the Enemy is a 1996 Australian romantic comedy film written and directed by Megan Simpson Huberman, starring Claudia Karvan and Guy Pearce. It tells the story of a male-female couple in Sydney who swap bodies and have to live each other's lives, learning about life as the other gender and to more fully empathise with each other. The supporting cast includes Matt Day, Lisa Hensley, Pippa Grandison and John Howard.

The film was released theatrically in Australia on 19 September 1996. It was a success upon release and has become a cult classic in subsequent years, gaining some recognition as a film that indirectly deals with transgender issues. Karvan was nominated for the 1996 Australian Film Institute Award for Best Actress in a Leading Role.

== Plot ==
One Valentine's Day evening in Sydney, Brett (Guy Pearce) and Tash (Claudia Karvan) meet at a party over a saucy strip version of Trivial Pursuit. The brash and self-confident Brett works as the presenter of a TV music show, while Tash is a studious and self-conscious science journalist for The Australian. While they have little in common, they are immediately attracted to each other.

A year later, their relationship is having difficulties. Brett has been offered a presenting job in New York City and his popularity has gone to his head. Tash is struggling to have serious scientific articles published while her bosses are more interested in gossip and sex. Brett has also been flirting with another woman, and Tash feels neglected. During a Valentine's Day boat trip on a full moon night in Sydney Harbour, an argument ensues and Tash tells him: "I wish you could be me, so you could see how I feel for once. I wish I could be you, so I could show you what an idiot you've become!"

They wake to find that they have swapped bodies, and must learn what it is really like to be in the other person's shoes. Both begin to learn about the pressures that society places on men and women, and the physiology of each other's bodies, including the effects of testosterone and estrogen on the system and the menstrual cycle. While they struggle and argue frequently to begin with, eventually each learns to appreciate the other as only together can they make the enforced predicament work.

Tash has to try to keep Brett's high-profile TV presenting career on track, while Brett has to maintain Tash's career as a science journalist. Brett in Tash's body puts a new spin on Tash's work by emphasising sex to appeal to a broader audience, and Tash is able to revitalise Brett's TV presenting career by using scientific analysis to obtain an interview thought impossible. Both of them are also coerced into sex by third parties in different ways, and have to negotiate the dynamics of same-gender friendships and relations.

When they finally have sex with each other, as each other, they return to their original bodies in the morning. Tash apologises for not having been there for him. Brett decides to accept the job, but not to leave for New York City. He suggests to his employer that he could host the show from Sydney, and that it could have multiple hosts from around the world "like the internet on TV." Tash and Brett then move in together, resuming their lives with a newfound sense of empathy for the other and for the other gender.

== Cast ==
The cast includes:

- Claudia Karvan as Tash/Brett
- Guy Pearce as Brett/Tash
- Matt Day as Rob
- Lisa Hensley as Laetitia
- John Howard as Davis
- Pippa Grandison as Colette
- Scott Lowe as Harrison
- Christopher Morsley as Paul
- Heidi Lapaine as Christina
- Christine Anu as The Singer
- Arthur Dignam as Dr Kamins
- Anja Coleby as Karen Zader
- Mark Hutchinson as Robert O'Neill
- Simmone Jade Mackinnon as Doctor's Assistant

== Production ==
Huberman began conceiving Dating the Enemy in the late 1980s, taking a few weeks' leave from a day job production managing and directing Japanese commercials to write the screenplay. She based the Brett character partly on ex-boyfriend David McComb, lead singer of The Triffids, as well as several other men she had dated. Huberman was inspired by films such as Desk Set, The Lady Eve, Pillow Talk and When Harry Met Sally. Guy Pearce was cast as Brett, and Jacqueline McKenzie was the first choice to play Tash but this role was ultimately given to Karvan. Karvan stated that she found Tash difficult to make comic but that Brett was "easy... he was just so transparent and so arrogant, yet so endearing and highly comic", adding that she "loved being in his body." The film was co-financed by the French distributor Pandora Film.

== Release ==
The film was released in theatres nationwide in Australia on 19 September 1996.

2024 reissue artwork

In 2024, it was restored by cinematographer Steve Arnold and reissued on Blu-ray by Umbrella Entertainment, with new artwork by New Yorker artist Margalit Cutler.

=== TV special ===
A tie-in TV special, Are You Dating the Enemy?, was recorded on 14 August and aired on the Seven Network on 19 September 1996. Hosted by Andrew Daddo, the special used clips from the film as a basis to discuss gender, romance and sexuality with a range of celebrities and Seven Network personalities, a panel of experts and random people on the streets of Sydney. Questions asked of guests included "What would you do if you woke up in a woman's/man's body for one day?" and "Will men and women really ever understand each other?"

Men interviewed included Nic Testoni and Shane Ammann of Home and Away, comedian George Smilovici, Australian Gladiators cast members Geoff Barker ("Commando") and Tony Forrow ("Predator"), sports commentator Andy Raymond and model Nathan Harvey, plus Dale Lewis and Matthew Nicks of the Sydney Swans. Among the women interviewed were Julia Morris, Belinda Emmett, Jeniene Mapp Testa of Saturday Disney and Bridget Adams of The Great Outdoors. Sitting on the panel was professional matchmaker Yvonne Allen, editor of Australian Women's Forum Sheryn George and psychologist/author Toby Green. Grant McLennan of The Go-Betweens also appeared, performing a live version of "Fingers." The special was included on the 2024 Blu-ray reissue.

== Reception ==
=== Critical response ===
On SBS' The Movie Show, Margaret Pomeranz and David Stratton each gave Dating the Enemy three stars. Pomeranz added that she found the premise confusing, but both her and Stratton enjoyed the film and were complimentary of the lead performances from Karvan and Pearce. The Age agreed that while the body swap premise was hardly original, the strength of the lead performances meant the "bubblegum, fairyfloss" film succeeded. Sandra Hall in The Sydney Morning Herald felt that the film had "glimmerings of anarchic humour" in the style of Some Like It Hot, Tootsie and the films of Rock Hudson and Doris Day, and that the film's depiction of Sydney was similar to that of New York City in other classic Hollywood romantic comedies. However, she conversely felt that the lead performances were the film's weakness, adding that "Pearce and Karvan still seem only vaguely aware of being in the same picture."

Adrian Martin wrote:

When I see a film about gender swapping, I mentally make an advance list of topics that I want to see included: Will the man in a woman’s body menstruate? Will masturbation figure as an event of self-discovery? Will there be some gay or bisexual complication, with a woman in a man’s body suddenly finding herself attracted to another woman, for instance (and likewise for the male switch)? Will there be certain social experiences of gender raised – like the sexual harassment of women on the streets or in the workplace; or the homo-social rituals of male bonding through sport, drinking and whatnot? Will there be much made of the different social manners of men and women, the different ways they talk, inhabit space, and have access (or not) to certain privileges and powers? And, the most fundamental question of all: will the man in a woman’s body, and the woman in a man’s body, have sex together – and if so, what will it be like for them? To its great credit, Dating the Enemy has a stab at just about everything on that list... Without disclosing anything central, and even though the film is forever a bit coy, I will say that I was pleasantly surprised at where the plot dares to go from there.

=== Box office ===
Dating The Enemy grossed $2,620,325 at the box office in Australia. After its theatrical release, it was one of the highest-rated movies of the year on Australian television.

== Soundtrack ==
The soundtrack was released on CD by Mercury Records, including the pop songs from the film as well as selections from the score by David Hirschfelder. The music video for OMC's "Right On" also featured clips from the film.

== Novelisation ==
A novelisation was written by Huberman over a four-week period during the film's post-production, with Thea Welsh completing the first draft. It was published by Harper Collins in September 1996.

== See also ==
- Switch
- It's a Boy Girl Thing
- The Hot Chick
