= 40,000 Years of Dreaming =

- Directed by: George Miller
- Written by: George Miller
- Produced by: Bob Last; Colin MacCabe
- Starring: George Miller
- Cinematography: Dion Beebe
- Edited by: Margaret Sixel
- Music by: Carl Vine
- Production companies: Australian Film Commission, Kennedy Miller Productions, BFI TV
- Release date: 10 November 1997
- Running time: 67 minutes
- Countries: United Kingdom; Australia
- Language: English

40,000 Years of Dreaming (also known as White Fellas Dreaming: A Century of Australian Cinema, 40,000 Years of Dreaming – A Century of Australian Cinema, A Century of Australian Cinema and The Years of Dreaming) is 1997 British documentary film directed and written by George Miller and produced by the British Film Institute, as part of its Century of Cinema series.

== Premise ==
The film is mainly a collage of various pieces of Australian film, past and present, including Miller's own Mad Max series. Miller focuses primarily on Australian cinema as a vessel of public Dreaming, creating a link between contemporary Australian cinema and the Dreamtime lores from a variety of Aboriginal Australian groups. Miller also places Australian cinema in the context of Joseph Campbell's monomyth concept.

== Availability ==
The film has been out of print since its release in 1997, along with several of the other films in the Century of Cinema series, apart from Martin Scorsese's feature.
