= The Territorians =

1996 Australian television film

- Directed by: Michael Offer
- Written by: Ted Roberts
- Produced by: Robert Bruning
- Starring: Steven Vidler; Aaron Pedersen
- Cinematography: David Foreman
- Edited by: David Jaeger
- Music by: Antony Partos
- Release date: September 9, 1996
- Running time: 90 minutes
- Country: Australia
- Language: English

The Territorians is a 1996 Australian television film shown on Seven. It is set in the Northern Territory but filmed in South Australia. Producers hoped to turn it into a series of telemovies.

== Premise ==
An aboriginal policeman from the outback is teamed up with a white detective from Sydney to investigate a murder in the outback town of Banka Banka.

== Cast ==
- Steven Vidler as Robert McCabe
- Aaron Pedersen as Tom Daly
- Peter Adams as Sarge Kennedy
- Susan Lyons as Anne McCabe
- Jamie Croft as Josh McCabe
- Kristen Boys as Sally
- Robert Mammone as Terry Gittoes

== Reception ==
The Territorians did well in the ratings, winning in its time slot, beating the broadcast of the Emmy Awards.

Brian Courtis in the Sunday Age wrote "Vidler and Pedersen make an interesting combination, but it is the portly Peter Adams, playing a sort of cross between Maurie Fields and Blue Heelers' Tom Croydon, who most promising. The Territorians has its fair share of aerial and land-bound action, some grisly victim scenes, and that wonderful scenery. The rest of the story, like the plot, is pretty familiar." Peter Malone says the "plot is fairly conventional" and the "scenery is quite spectacular".
