= Boston Society of Film Critics Award for Best Editing =

Annual US film award

== Winners ==
=== 2000s ===
Year	Winner	Editor(s)
2008	Slumdog Millionaire	Chris Dickens
2009	The Hurt Locker	Chris Innis and Bob Murawski

=== 2010s ===
Year	Winner	Editor(s)
2010	Black Swan	Andrew Weisblum
2011	The Clock	Christian Marclay
2012	Zero Dark Thirty	William Goldenberg and Dylan Tichenor
2013	Rush	Daniel P. Hanley and Mike Hill
2014	Boyhood	Sandra Adair
2015	Mad Max: Fury Road	Margaret Sixel
2016	Cameraperson	Nels Bangerter
2017	A Ghost Story	David Lowery
2018	First Man	Tom Cross
2019	The Irishman	Thelma Schoonmaker

=== 2020s ===
Year	Winner	Editor(s)
2020	I’m Thinking of Ending Things	Robert Frazen
2021	The Velvet Underground	Affonso Gonçalves and Adam Kurnitz
2022	Aftersun	Blair McClendon
2022	Decision to Leave	Kim Sang-bum
2023	Killers of the Flower Moon	Thelma Schoonmaker
2024	Challengers	Marco Costa
2025	F1	Stephen Mirrione

== See also ==
- Academy Award for Best Editing
