= Game of Life (TV programme) =

Game of Life (also The Game of Life) is an educational programme for teenagers, commissioned by the ABC and SBS in 1986. The format was that a compere (Mic Conway) would teleport seven youths to a disco in the opening credits, one of whom would be chosen as that episode's reporter. Topic included leaving high school, sex and drugs. Mic Conway said, "It got a big response mainly from people who didn't like that it tackled "youth" issues like drugs, sex etc.; just as families were settling down to dinner and the ABC news, so it was not taken up again." The eight episodes screened from Thursday 3 April 1986 on ABC, and were repeated twice on both ABC and SBS

== Episodes ==
1. Just Good Friends (3 April 1986)
2. A Way to Play Peacefully (10 April 1986)
3. I Feel Like I'm Thirty (17 April 1986)
4. Education Doesn't Mean Nothin' To Me (24 April 1986)
5. I Need a Job (1 May 1986)
6. Hey Mum I'm on TV (8 May 1986)
7. Youth Rules OK (15 May 1986)
8. We Live for Love (22 May 1986)

== Credits ==
Reporters:
Mark Wooder
Simon Peart
Brett Thomson
Angela Martinkus
Lisbeth Kennelly
Lisa Hensley
Simon Njoo

Compere: Mic Conway
Miss Heroine: Denny Gordon
Soap box orator: Ian Nimmo
School teacher: Peter Carmody

Directors: Michael Pattinson, Louise Meek, Hugh Piper, James Bradley
Producer: Jim George
Production research coordinator: Kris Wyld
Production research coordinator: Judy Menczel

Production companies: Communique Pty Ltd, Ultrafun Pty Ltd
Distribution company: Communique Pty Ltd
Working title: Youth in Australia '85
