= Big Reef =

- Written by: Roger Simpson
- Directed by: Steve Jodrell
- Starring: Angus Grant; Madeleine West
- Country of origin: Australia
- Original language: English

Production
- Producers: Roger Simpson; Roger Le Mesurier; Andrew Walker
- Cinematography: Mark Wareham
- Editor: Peter Carrodus
- Running time: 100 minutes

Original release
- Network: Nine Network
- Release: 2004

Big Reef is an Australian television film that aired on the Nine Network in 2004. It was intended as a pilot for a series. It was filmed in Cooktown, Queensland.

== Synopsis ==
After losing his job, apartment and girlfriend Melbourne journalist Tom Stopple move to the far north Queensland town Paradise. He arrives during a cyclone, gets involved in a boat rescue, a chase for a giant crocodile and a hunt for a lost fortune.

== Cast ==
- Angus Grant as Tom Stopple
- Madeleine West as Casey Lane
- Jack Finsterer as Nick Ritten
- Steve Bisley as Denton Reilly
- Lisa Hensley as Charlene
- Damien Garvey as Jim Daisy
- Catherine Moore as Alana Gock
- Sharni Page as Alison
- Brendan Glanville as Sergeant Tremain
- Andrew Blain as Arnold
- Mellara Gold as Gina
- Steven Smith as Mandy
- Kevin Potts as Phyllis

== Reception ==
Mark Mordue of the Australian calls it "a masterpiece of the so bad it's good school" and writes "By the time an English backpacker is screaming a crocodile's got Gina and Steve Bisley is cruising through scenes with black wraparound shades and bad-man music playing, Big Reef is piling on enough ridiculous characters and twists to hold you in its jaws until the end."

In the Sun-Herald Brian Courtis gave it 2 stars. His casual review asked "What is it about Channel Nine's drama ventures in Queensland that makes them so often forget the plot?"
