= Matilda Brown =

Australian actress (born 1987)

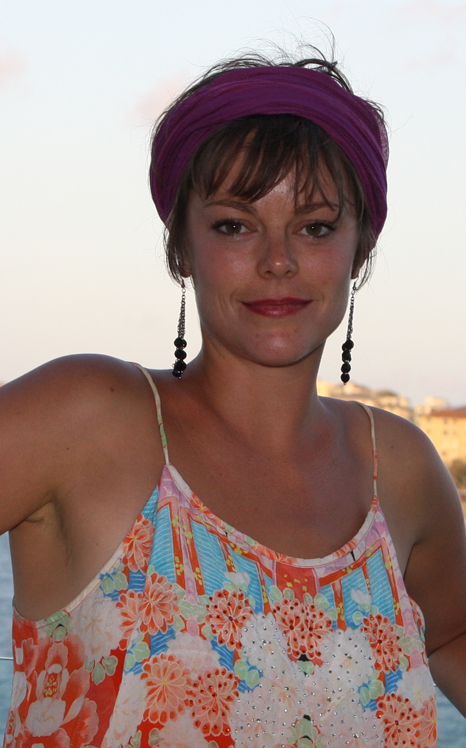
- Matilda Brown at the 2012 Flickerfest International Short Film Festival in Sydney
- Born: 27 February 1987 (age 39); Sydney, Australia
- Occupations: Actress, film director, screenwriter
- Years active: 1996–2019
- Spouse: Scott Gooding
- Children: 2
- Parents: Bryan Brown (father); Rachel Ward (mother)

Matilda Brown (born 27 February 1987) is an Australian former actress, writer and director.

== Career ==
Brown is best known for her work in Lessons from the Grave, in which she starred opposite her father, Bryan Brown. Her mother is actress Rachel Ward.

Her short film, How God Works, was a finalist in the 2010 Tropfest.

Other television credits include guest spots on My Place, Rake and Offspring.

Her husband is former My Kitchen Rules contestant Scott Gooding. In May 2019, they had a son. The two married on Saturday 16 November 2019. In February 2021, the two had a daughter. She is stepmother to Scott's son from a previous relationship. Since 2021, Brown and Gooding have run The Good Farm Shop, a ready-meals company.

== Selected filmography ==
=== Film ===
- Martha's New Coat (2003)
- The Road Ahead (2007) Short film
- How God Works (2010) Short film
- Cocks (2011) Short film
- Am I Okay (2012) Short film
- The iMom (2014) Short film
- The Death and Life of Otto Bloom (2016) as Young Ada Fitzgerald

=== Television ===
- Twisted Tales (1996) as Fiona
- Underbelly: The Golden Mile (2010) as Ellie Dooley
- Offspring (2010)
- Rake (2010–12)
- My Place (2011)
- Lessons from the Grave (2013) Miniseries
- Let's Talk About (2015) as Claire
- Palm Beach (2019) as Ella

=== As director/writer ===
- How God Works (2010) Short film - Director/writer
- Cocks (2011) Short film - Director/writer
- Am I Okay (2012) Short film - Director
- Lessons from the Grave (2013) Miniseries -Director/writer
- Let's Talk About (2015) - Director/writer

== Awards and nominations ==
Year	Award	Category	Nominated work	Result	Ref.
2005	RiverRun International Film Festival	Best Actress in a Feature Film	Martha's New Coat	Won	
2016	AACTA Awards	Best New Talent	Let's Talk About	Nominated	
