= Lessons from the Grave =

Australian drama television series

- Genre: Comedy; Drama; Crime
- Written by: Matilda Brown; Matthew Jenkin
- Directed by: Matilda Brown
- Starring: Bryan Brown; Matilda Brown
- Composer: Oliver Leimbach
- Country of origin: Australia
- Original language: English
- No. of series: 2
- No. of episodes: 20

Production
- Executive producer: Bryan Brown
- Producer: Matilda Brown
- Cinematography: Chris Bland
- Running time: 3 minutes

Original release
- Network: ABC
- Release: 2013 – 2014

Lessons from the Grave is an Australian series of short films, created by Matilda Brown who co-stars with her father Bryan Brown.

== Synopsis ==
The plot follows a young woman named Bonnie, played by Matilda Brown, whose life is suddenly upended when her father, Douglas (Bryan Brown), wins the lottery and then immediately dies from a heart attack. Unwilling to move on, Douglas returns as a ghost to teach his country-dwelling daughter the important lessons in life he feels she still needs.

== Cast ==
- Bryan Brown as Douglas
- Matilda Brown as Bonnie

== Reception ==
Commenting on the first three episodes Nazia Hafiz of the AU Review gave it 3 1/2 stars. She writes " Theseries thus far has hit the nail on the head when it comes to capturing subtleties of how Australian culture deals with the hard stuff through humour, making it a familiar and heartening viewing experience."
