= Palm Beach (2019 film) =

- Theatrical film poster
- Directed by: Rachel Ward
- Screenplay by: Joanna Murray-Smith; Rachel Ward
- Produced by: Deborah Balderstone; Bryan Brown
- Starring: Frances Berry; Bryan Brown; Matilda Brown
- Cinematography: Bonnie Elliott
- Edited by: Nick Meyers
- Production companies: New Townfilms; Soapbox Industries
- Distributed by: Universal Pictures (Australia/New Zealand); Entertainment One (through Seville International; International)
- Release dates: 5 June 2019 (Sydney Film Festival); 8 August 2019
- Running time: 100 minutes
- Country: Australia
- Language: English
- Box office: $3.2 million

Palm Beach is a 2019 Australian comedy drama film directed by Rachel Ward, and starring Sam Neill and Bryan Brown, the latter of whom also co-produced the film.

== Plot ==
A reunion party is being held at Palm Beach in Sydney by a group of lifelong friends.

== Cast ==
- Frances Berry as Caitlin
- Bryan Brown as Frank
- Matilda Brown as Ella
- Richard E. Grant as Billy
- Aaron Jeffery as Doug
- Jacqueline McKenzie as Bridget
- Heather Mitchell as Eva
- Sam Neill as Leo
- Greta Scacchi as Charlotte
- Charlie Vickers as Dan
- Lisa Hensley as Lorna
- Claire van der Boom as Holly
- Renee Lim as Dr. Hall
- Felix Williamson as Taxi Driver

== Response ==
=== Box office ===
Palm Beach grossed $3.2 million internationally, $3 million of this in Australia.

=== Critical reception ===
On review aggregator website Rotten Tomatoes, the film holds an approval rating of 48% based on 29 reviews, with an average rating of 5.1/10.

Sandra Hall of The Sydney Morning Herald wrote, "Rachel Ward's Palm Beach is a seniors' edition of The Big Chill, transplanted to Sydney's northern beaches and populated with a cast of Australian favourites [...] A less likeable group of actors could easily have been upstaged by the conspicuous perfection of the setting and the décor. This bunch hold their own, but a sharper script would have made them shine even brighter." Louise Keller of Urban Cinefile called the film "a good-hearted get-together of old friends and family when resentments flair, flailing relationships are revealed and secrets demand to be heard. But it aches for some grit."

== Soundtrack ==
The original soundtrack was released on 19 July 2019, by Universal Music Australia and peaked at number 37 on the ARIA Charts.
