= Twisted Tales (Australian TV series) =

- Genre: Drama
- Country of origin: Australia
- Original language: English
- No. of series: 1
- No. of episodes: 12

Production
- Executive producers: Bryan Brown; Kris Noble
- Producers: Bryan Brown; Helen Watts
- Production company: New Town Films

Original release
- Network: Nine Network
- Release: 2 December 1996 – 25 January 1998

Twisted Tales is an Australian television anthology and mystery drama which screened on the Nine Network from December 1996 to January 1998. Each episode was narrated by Bryan Brown, who also produced the follow-up series, Two Twisted, in 2006. Each episode of the series contains a twist ending.

== Cast ==
- Aaron Blabey as Nick
- Anthony Hayes as Damien
- Barry Crocker as Sir Barry Doyle
- Brittany Byrnes as Jessie Courtney
- Bruce Spence as Colin
- Bryan Brown as Jack Johnson
- Claudia Karvan as Cassie Blake
- Daniel Krige as Judy's Brother
- David Wenham as George
- Dee Smart as Judy Raven
- Gary Day as Lowell
- Geoffrey Rush as Harry Chisholm
- Grant Piro as Merrill
- Jacek Koman as Taxi Driver
- Jessica Napier as Michelle
- John Walton as Arthur Pendle
- Jonathan Hardy as Roger Mormon
- Josephine Byrnes as Julia
- Joy Hruby as Agnes Fuller
- Judy Morris as Veronica
- Justine Clarke as Pip
- Kate Fischer as Melody Christian
- Kate Fitzpatrick as Elizabeth Bishop
- Ken Talbot
- Kimberley Davies as Betty
- Les Foxcroft as Neighbour
- Loene Carmen as Katey
- Mark Lee as Frank
- Marshall Napier as Ray
- Matilda Brown as Fiona
- Matthew Krok as Matthew
- Mercia Deane-Johns as Woman
- Mitchell Butel as Waiter
- Nadine Garner as Mallory
- Noni Hazelhurst as Anne
- Paul Livingston as Brendan
- Pippa Grandison as Karen
- Rachel Ward as Sarah
- Richard Carter as Jim Nicholson
- Richard Roxburgh as Ben
- Robert Mammone as Steven Gaines
- Robert Taylor as Peter
- Russell Kiefel as George
- Salvatore Coco as Sav Rocca
- Sandy Winton as Bartender
- Shane Briant as Jay Condor
- Simon Westaway as John Berryman
- Steve Bastoni as Constable Paul Bell
- Tottie Goldsmith as Vanessa Condor

== Production ==
Actor and producer Bryan Brown placed a newspaper advertisement requesting scripts for the project. He ended up receiving more than 1,200 entries which was cut to 12. Most of the successful script submissions came from writers with no prior experience. The music was handled by Nerida Tyson-Chew. For her work on the series, she was awarded with the "Best Original Music for a TV Series or Serial" by the Australian Guild of Screen Composers in 1997.

== Release ==
The series initially aired during late 1996 and early 1997, before going on hiatus. Later in 1997, a video titled Still Twisted was made for the Australian and American markets. It compiled various episodes from the series into a single movie.

The show briefly returned to Australian television in early 1998.

== Episode list ==
No.	Title	Directed by	Written by	Original release date
1	"Night of the Monster"	Stephen Wallace	Heather Christie	23 December 1996
2	"Third Party"	Samantha Lang	Neil Burman	9 December 1996
3	"Directly from My Heart to You"	Catherine Millar	Louis Nowra	30 December 1996
4	"The Crossing"	Kate Dennis	Gabiann Marin	3 February 1997
5	"Cold Revenge"	Daniel Krige	Daniel Krige	2 December 1996
6	"Dancing Partners"	Ian Gilmour	Graeme Nixon	1997 (as part of Still Twisted); January 4, 1998
7	"The Confident Man"	Gregor Jordan	Tim Rolfe	6 January 1997
A charismatic con man (Bryan Brown) finds himself forced to rely on his wits when he's held hostage in a liquor store robbery.
8	"Bonus Mileage"	Christopher Robin Collins	Simon D. Hoenger	16 December 1996
9	"The Test"	Lynn Hegarty	Heather Christie	11 January 1998
10	"A Sure Thing"	Lewis Fitz-Gerald	Gary N. Lines	25 January 1998
11	"Borrowing Bazza"	David Caesar	Duncan Ball	20 January 1997
12	"One Way Ticket"	Michael Offer	Daniel Krige	13 January 1997

== See also ==
- List of Australian television series
- List of Nine Network programs
