= MDA (TV series) =

Australian television series

- Created by: Greg Haddrick & Des Monaghan
- Starring: Shane Bourne; Angus Grant; Angie Milliken; Petra Jared; Kerry Armstrong; Jason Donovan; Alice McConnell; Felix Nobis; Michael Carman; Aaron Pedersen
- Composer: Roger Mason
- Country of origin: Australia
- No. of seasons: 3
- No. of episodes: 56

Production
- Editor: Steven Robinson
- Running time: approx. 0:55 (commercial free)
- Production companies: Screentime; Optus Television

Original release
- Network: ABC
- Release: 23 July 2002 – 22 September 2005

MDA is an Australian television series that aired between 2002 and 2005 on the Australian Broadcasting Corporation (ABC). It concerned the day-to-day operation of legal firm MDA, which specialised in medical defence.

== Synopsis ==
The title refers to the firm Medical Defence Australia, a team of lawyers and doctors who defend doctors charged with malpractice, ranging from Botox injections gone wrong to spinal cord injuries. The firm operates by collecting annual subscriptions from doctors, rather than on a case-by-case fee basis.

The main characters in the pilot episode included Dr Louella "Ella" Davis, the moral centre of the firm whose passion lies equally distributed between her work at St Albans Hospital Emergency Ward, and defending doctors; "Happy" Henderson, a lawyer whose nickname can be greatly misleading; Dr Jamie Lawless, an optimistic young doctor whose passion for helping others often leads him to inner conflict; Caitlin King, the new law recruit at MDA whose ambitions far exceed what she can do at the firm; Layla Young of the Bahá'í faith, the friendly receptionist; Dr Tony McKinnon, a doctor who works with Ella at the hospital; and Richard Savage – the cutthroat plaintiff's advocate who often does battles with MDA.

MDA premiered in 2002 during a downturn in the making of Australian television. Despite critical acclaim and a number of awards, initially no renewal was made after the second season (2003). A year later, the ABC ordered another 12 episodes for 2005, but by this time several key actors had moved on. More multi-episode story arcs were used and critical response was lukewarm. Although sentiment eventually warmed, the series was not renewed after the third season.

=== Season 1 ===
In the opening episodes, Ella faced personal problems when her lover Nick wished to move out of the country, and she often discussed these with her sister Edwina, but those characters quickly faded into the background. Edwina did return, for one episode, in the second season.

The first episodes did not draw impressive ratings, and the critics were ambivalent, but by the eighth episode – "Bowels, Bosch and the Whole Damn Thing", in which Happy faced health problems – Jamie fell for Wendy Rossi, a doctor facing manslaughter, and Caitlin began to consider working with Richard instead of MDA – the show began to gain attention.

Other notable characters of the first season were Helena, a prosecutor whose lack of ability often led to comic relief moments; Claudia, Richard's sardonic barrister; Giles, the amiable old barrister contracted to MDA; Dr Vince Phillips, a doctor on the MDA board whose desire to take over led to a legal battle; and Dr Mark Matthews, the head of the MDA board.

In the final episodes of the season, Ella and Tony became victims of a civil suit which led to them facing considerable press exposure. They were found not guilty, but in the final moments of the season finale, Divine intervention, angry plaintiff Debbie Shanahan drove her car directly at Jamie, Tony and Ella, and the audience was left to wonder who had survived.

=== Season 2 ===
Although the ratings had been average, MDA was granted a second season.

The second season improved markedly from the first season, tightening storylines and scripts. The season opened with the episode "Eternity" in which Tony (played by Indigenous Australian actor Aaron Pedersen) died on the operating table, and Caitlin moved to Richard Savage's firm. Caitlin gets off to a bumpy start with the MDA when she becomes involved with Justin Harris (a man secretly under investigation for murder, played by Jeremy Callaghan). After Justin is cleared he feels that there is no trust in their relationship and leaves Caitlin.

Two new characters joined: Amanda McKay, a legal case manager; and Simon Lloyd, a doctor joining MDA. Amanda and Simon's relationship evolves as a will-they-or-won't-they? couple of the show, with the risk increased due to his wife who worked abroad. By season's end they were a couple, but were still easing into it.

Significant season two storylines included the destruction of Jamie and Wendy's relationship, Dr Phillips' increasing efforts to become head of MDA, and the potential destruction of MDA itself as he attempts to incite a revolution against the firm, Caitlin and Richard's personal and professional fighting, Layla's grandmother getting closer to death, and Happy dealing with his son Jason.

In the second half of the season, Caitlin was written out of the show, as the producers decided her character had run its course. Kerry Armstrong also decided to leave – because the low Government funding for the arts in Australia under the Howard conservative government (often criticised within the industry) meant that appearing on one television show was not a sustainable income. Ella, subsequently, took a full-time posting at St. Albans' as Head of Emergency and only appeared occasionally during the latter half of season 2, making her final appearance in the penultimate episode "Pas de deux".

Despite increased audience size, critical response, and award nominations, the ABC made no official announcement of the show's renewal. The final episode, "Memento Mori", aired on 17 December 2003.

While it was no surprise that the ABC did not make an immediate announcement about the show's fate – many Australian television series will often miss a year due to actor's schedules and production demands – it was eight months before an announcement was made. During this time, Jason Donovan and Felix Nobis both moved on to other projects.

=== Season 3 ===
In August 2004, the ABC finally announced its new commitment: a 12-episode order, which would air as three four-hour miniseries in 2005. While the order was small, the renewal meant that MDA was the only series to have started in 2002 which was still on the air as of 2005.

The third season began on 30 June 2005, and was greeted with lacklustre ratings, despite an impressive guest cast. Critical response, initially negative, warmed as the season progressed, to the point where it was largely positive.

- Episodes 1–4: Second chance. Facing a separation from his wife, Happy becomes enamored of a brilliant geneticist, Dr Robyn Masterson (Sigrid Thornton) whose controversial experiments are in danger of being shut down. While Happy's personal feelings lead him to champion her cause, he begins to discover that all is not as it seems. Meanwhile, Amanda investigates a separate case regarding Dr Masterson's lab assistant Julia (Anita Hegh); and Layla, Mark and Jamie fear for Happy's wellbeing. Aaron Blabey also stars as Dr Masterson's assistant. As incident after incident befalls Robyn's team, she blames outside forces but some suspect that she herself isn't being honest with MDA, and ultimately Happy is forced to make the choice between his relationship with Robyn and the good of the company. Nicholas Hammond also guest stars in this episode.
- Episodes 5–8: Departure lounge. With Jamie on holiday, MDA take on a temporary case manager, Dr Andrew Morello (Vince Colosimo), an anaesthetist with strong suspicions about the high rate of infant deaths at his hospital. So when he and Amanda assist Ted Walsh (Terry Brady), a prominent doctor with similar suspicions, Morello begins to investigate – which leads him to suspect prominent cardiologist Rupert Carr (Frank Gallacher). As Morello confides in Happy, he begins attempting to stop Carr's practices without coming out and speaking his mind, which will ultimately result in the end of both their careers. When Andrew goes up on his own charges, Happy recalls Jamie back to MDA so that Andrew can be dismissed. As everyone including MDA turns against him, news about his wife Lucy (Jane Allsop) ultimately compels Andrew to make a final decision. Meanwhile, Amanda goes up against Gabrielle Bromley (Wendy Hughes), a fierce prosecuting attorney.
- Episodes 9–12: A human cost. Happy has a sudden angina attack, and while in an outer suburban hospital befriends intern Dr Liz Gibson (Lisa McCune). The next day, Gibson becomes the subject of a medical negligence writ. Concerned that her boss, Meg Morrison (Louise Siversen), and her nemesis, nurse Chloe Davis (Jacinta Stapleton) are teaming up against her, Liz seeks Happy's assistance. Even though both Amanda and Liz herself have doubts about her competence, Happy stands by her. However, when Jamie and Layla discover just how understaffed and incompetently run Prospect Valley Hospital is, they realise that someone might be making Liz a scapegoat to cover up greater crimes. Elsewhere, Amanda goes up against a Health Review Board manager, David Simpson (Erik Thomson) in court, only to find herself in a passionate relationship with him outside of work. But when she learns that he may be behind the plot to convict Liz, Amanda is put into a devastating conflict of interest. Things come to a head when Liz and her boyfriend – fellow intern Dr Tim Whitney (Paul Bishop) – must both be protected against the schemes at the hospital, and as Happy fights with Amanda over the case, his health takes a serious turn for the worse.

== Cast ==
=== Main cast ===
- Shane Bourne as Bill 'Happy' Henderson
- Angus Grant as Dr Jamie Lawless
- Petra Jared as Layla Young
- Angie Milliken as Amanda McKay (2003–05)
- Kerry Armstrong as Dr Louella 'Ella' Davis (2002–03)
- Jason Donovan as Richard Savage (2002–03)
- Alice McConnell as Caitlin King (2002–03)
- Aaron Pedersen as Dr Tony McKinnon (2002 + first episode of season 2)
- Felix Nobis as Dr Simon Lloyd (2003)

=== Guests ===
- Aaron Blabey as Luke Rodman, Dr Masterson's assistant (2005, 4 episodes)
- Ailsa Piper as Dr Carol Westerman (2003, 1 episode)
- Alan Cassell as Dr. Oscar Ricketson (2003, 1 episode)
- Alan Hopgood as Dr Hugo Willard (2002–03)
- Alex Papps as Dr Hamish McGregor (2002, 1 episode)
- Alexandra Schepisi as Edwina 'Ed' Davis (2002–03)
- Amanda Douge as Lucy Carlton (1 episode)
- André De Vanny as Joshua Tranter (2003)
- Anita Hegh as Julia Delvecchio, Dr Masterson's lab assistant (2005, 4 episodes)
- Belinda Giblin as Renae Samon (1 episode)
- Bernard Curry as Troy Dalmer (2003, 1 episode)
- Bob Baines as Murray Trench (2 episodes)
- Colette Mann as Daphne (2003, 1 episode)
- Dan Paris as Nathan (2003, 1 episode)
- Daniella Farinacci as Dr Wendy Rossi (2002–03)
- David Clencie as Jack Panogeas (2002, 1 episode)
- Elena Mandalis as Tina Morello (2002, 1 episode)
- Erik Thomson as David Simpson
- Frank Gallacher as Rupert Carr (4 episodes)
- Gareth Yuen as Dr Angus Yu (2 episodes)
- Georgina Naidu as Siobhan Ray (1 episode)
- Greg Stone as Dr Garth Carmody (1 episode)
- Helen Thomson as Nerida Bailey (2 episodes)
- Ian Rawlings as Paul (2003, 1 episode)
- Jacek Koman as Dr Mikhail Varonio (1 episode)
- Jacinta Stapleton as Nurse Chloe Davis (2005)
- Jack Phillpotts as Eddie Delaney (2003)
- Jane Allsop as Lucy Morello (2005, 4 episodes)
- Jeremy Callaghan as Justin Harris (2003)
- Jeremy Stanford as Dr Tim Hawthorne (2002–2003, 6 episodes)
- John McTernan as Dr Michael Forsythe (2002, 2 episodes)
- John Walton as David Lowe (2003, 1 episode)
- Jonathan Hardy as Justice Tulloch (2003, 2 episodes)
- Jonathon Dutton as Brett Ferris (2003, 1 episode)
- Lisa McCune as Dr Liz Gibson (intern) (2005, 4 episodes)
- Louise Siversen as Meg Morrison (2005, 4 episodes)
- Mandy McElhinney as Helena (2002–03)
- Matthew Le Nevez as Sam Livingstone (2002, 4 episodes)
- Michael Carman as Dr Mark Matthews
- Michele Fawdon as Cynthia Morice (2 episodes)
- Monica Maughan as Justice Hoffman (2 episodes)
- Nell Feeney as Elise Fenton (2002, 1 episode)
- Nicholas Bell as Oliver Maudson (2002, 2 episodes)
- Nicholas Hammond as Dr Nick Standish (2004, 4 episodes)
- Nicki Paull as Dr Karen Hill (1 episode)
- Nina Landis as Claudia Monserrat (2002–03)
- Paul Bishop as Dr Tim Whitney (intern)
- Peta Brady as Melissa Morrice (2003, 2 episodes)
- Peter Curtin as Bernard Bennett (2002, 1 episode)
- Rebecca Frith as Fran Griffin (2003, 3 episodes)
- Rhys McConnochie as Giles Jones, QC (2002–03)
- Richard Morgan as Dr John Baldwin (1 episode)
- Robert Taylor as Paul Bennett (2002)
- Sam Healy as Martine Fallon (1 episode)
- Sarah Chadwick as Dr Sarah Christie (2003, 1 episode)
- Sigrid Thornton as Dr Robyn Masterson (2005, 4 episodes)
- Simon Stone as Jason Henderson (2002–03)
- Stephen Kearney as Dr Vince Phillips (2002–03)
- Steve Mouzakis as Bart Saunders (2003, 1 episode)
- Steven Vidler as Nick Clarke (1999, 3 episodes)
- Sullivan Stapleton as Ben Quilty (2 episodes)
- Suzi Dougherty as Debbie Shanahan (2002–03)
- Syd Brisbane as Scott Watts 2003, 1 episode)
- Terence Donovan as Eric Savage (2003)
- Terry Brady as Dr Ted Walsh
- Tim Burns as Tom Cusack (2002)
- Tim Rogers as Joel (2005, 1 episode)
- Tina Bursill as Dr. Ruth McIntyre (2002, 1 episode)
- Tracy Mann as Penny Silvani (2003, 1 episode)
- Vince Colosimo as Dr Andrew Morello (2005, 4 episodes)
- Wendy Hughes as Gabrielle Bromley

== Awards ==
- 2002 – Nominee – Australian Film Institute Awards – Best Drama Series
- 2002 – Nominee – Australian Film Institute Awards – Best Actor – Shane Bourne
- 2002 – Nominee – Australian Film Institute Awards – Best Supporting Actor – Angus Grant
- 2002 – Nominee – Australian Film Institute Awards – Best Actress – Kerry Armstrong
- 2003 – Nominee – Australian Film Institute Awards – Best Screenplay – Bill Garner, episode: "Crossing the Line"
- 2003 – Nominee – International Emmy Awards – Best Drama Series
- 2003 – Winner – Australian Film Institute Awards – Best Drama Series
- 2003 – Winner – Australian Film Institute Awards – Best Actor – Shane Bourne
- 2003 – Winner – Australian Film Institute Awards – Best Actress – Angie Milliken
- 2004 – Winner – Australian Cinematographers Society – Award of Distinction – Graham Brumley – episode: "A Bird in the Hand"
- 2005 – Winner – Australian Film Institute Awards – Best Actor in Television – Shane Bourne
- 2005 – Winner – Australian Film Institute Awards – Best Supporting Actress in Television – Anita Hegh

== Releases ==
The ABC released online seven-day rental copies of series one and two under its ABC Digital label.

== See also ==
- List of Australian television series
