= Let's Talk About =

- Genre: Comedy
- Written by: Matilda Brown
- Directed by: Matilda Brown
- Starring: Matilda Brown; Richard Davies
- Country of origin: Australia
- Original language: English
- No. of seasons: 1
- No. of episodes: 10

Production
- Executive producer: Bryan Brown
- Producer: Matilda Brown
- Running time: 4-6 minutes
- Production company: New Town Films

Original release
- Network: Presto
- Release: 30 October – 10 November 2015

Let's Talk About is an Australian comedy television series which first screened on Presto. The series is the first commission produced for Presto. The series is about a couple who deal with an unexpected pregnancy. It is written, directed and stars Matilda Brown, along with Richard Davies.

== Cast ==
=== Main ===
- Bryan Brown as Barry Hardliner
- Lisa Hensley as Anne Hardliner
- Richard Davies as Ben Gould
- Matilda Brown as Claire Hardliner
- Christopher Stollery as Doctor

=== Recurring ===
- Oliver Leimbach as Birthing Class Member
- Harley Van Valen as Birthing Class Member
- Karina Banno as Birthing Class Member
- Emily Jean Bester as Birthing Class Member
- Steve Le Marquand as Chip
- Sally the Dog as Sally the Dog
- Amelia Beau Kaldor as Nurse
- Bruce Spence as Man in Toilet
- Chloe Boreham as Screaming Pregnant Mother
