= The Umbrella Woman =

- Directed by: Ken Cameron
- Written by: Peter Kenna
- Produced by: Jan Sharp
- Starring: Sam Neill; Bryan Brown; Rachel Ward; Bruce Barry
- Distributed by: Roadshow Films
- Release date: 14 May 1987 (Australia)
- Country: Australia
- Language: English
- Budget: A$3.5 million
- Box office: A$100,189 (Australia)

The Umbrella Woman (released in some areas as The Good Wife) is a 1987 Australian film directed by Ken Cameron and starring Bryan Brown and Rachel Ward. It also features Steven Vidler and Sam Neill.

== Premise ==
The film tells the story of a man and his wife, whose marriage is complicated by a relationship between the man's brother and his wife and his wife's attraction to the manager of the local bar. The setting is pre-war Australia.

== Cast ==
- Rachel Ward as Marge Hills
- Bryan Brown as Sonny Hills
- Steven Vidler as Sugar Hills
- Sam Neill as Neville Gifford
- Jennifer Claire as Daisy
- Bruce Barry as Archie
- Peter Cummins as Ned Hopper
- Carole Skinner as Mrs. Gibson
- Clarissa Kaye as Mrs. Jackson
- Barry Hill as Mr. Fielding
- Susan Lyons as Mrs. Fielding
- Helen Jones as Rosie Gibbs
- Lisa Hensley as Sylvia
- May Howlett as Mrs. Carmicheal
- Maureen Green as Sal Day
- Gerry Cook as Gerry Day
- Harold Kissin as Davis
- Oliver Hall as Mick Jones
- Sue Ingleton as Rita
- Maurice Hughes as Sgt. Larkin
- Marg Haynes as Greta
- Craig Fuller as Charlie

== Production ==
Producer Jan Sharp originally intended her husband, Phillip Noyce to direct, but he went on to make Echoes of Paradise instead, so she hired Ken Cameron. Cameron:

I was very happy to do it but it was a picture that I think would always be hard to do. It's terribly hard to do Madame Bovary in Australia and it's very hard to graft, say, that European style of melodrama or melodramatically intense view of family and sexual relations on to the Australian landscape. There's something there that refuses to play the game about the Australian country town.

== Box office ==
The Umbrella Woman grossed $100,189 at the box office in Australia. The film was not widely seen overseas either. Cameron says the movie hurt his career:

I think the reason that it didn't work was that there was something very difficult to understand about the relationship between Bryan and Rachel. They were at the height of their public relationship, very well known as a happy couple. It was terribly hard to cast them as a couple who had some unstated problem in their marriage because everything in fact denied that. So it was hard to understand why she would run after the barman when Bryan was there, because Bryan is quite iconic and quite wonderful as an Australian country man... Without wishing Sam Neill away, because I think he's terrific - it might have worked better had Bryan been the barman... I think that this was an example of how you can cast a film with great excitement, get all these wonderful actors but, at the same time, in the very act of casting, you're blighting it or preventing the drama from emerging successfully.

== See also ==
- Cinema of Australia
