= Angus Grant =

Australian actor

- Occupation: Actor
- Notable work: MDA, Big Reef

Angus Grant is an Australian actor. He starred in the TV series MDA and TV movie Big Reef. He was nominated for 2002 Australian Film Institute Award for Best Actor in a Supporting or Guest Role in a Television Drama for his role in MDA.

Stage roles Grant featured in include Venus in Furs (Theatreworks, 2008), Spring Awakening (multiple venues, 2007-08) and Platonov (Hayloft, 2008),
