= The Rabble =

New Zealand punk band

- Origin: New Zealand
- Genres: Punk rock Hardcore Punk
- Years active: 2001–present
- Label: Filthy Lucre
- Members: Chazz Hill-Hayr; Rupert Hill-Hayr; Jamie Douglass
- Past members: Sam Hume; Gavin James; Miles McComish; Rowan Crowe
- Website: The Rabble Myspace

The Rabble are a New Zealand punk band from Auckland, New Zealand, with a street punk aesthetic that was formed by brothers Charles Hill-Hayr (Chazz Rabble) and Rupert Hill-Hayr in the 2000 while still attending Orewa College. Their official Myspace page went live on 29 February 2004. They collaborated with Mark Unseen of Boston band The Unseen to create the song and video for "This World is Dead" from their album The Battle's Almost Over. The Rabble went on tour in the UK and Europe from August 2009 to January 2010, as well as writing and recording for their next album. They recorded at York Street Studios in Auckland early in 2008, and the bass and guitars were tracked at Number 8 Wire recording studio, by Chazz Rabble.

In April 2010, they were in the line-up at Punk & Disorderly Festival in Berlin. On 1 August 2011, The Rabble released Life's A Journey. They were the second band to be announced for Rebellion Festival in 2013 along with Left Alone after their successful show at Rebellion in 2009. They were joined by The Casualties and The Exploited. In the early demos they had more of a punk-core sound (street punk) as opposed to the recent pop rock sound they had adopted. The lyrics were sometimes in English and some times in Malay, due to the original vocalist's (Ben) mother tongue of Malaysian. They also played with an Auckland-based Thai street punk band, Chaos City who, at one point, played for Missing Teeth and the Rudies and made their name in the underground Necropolis venue on the outskirts of the Auckland CBD.

The group is now inactive; both Chazz and Rupert have moved onto solo projects.

== Members ==
- Chazz Rabble (Chazz Hill-Hayr) – vocals, guitar
- Rupe Rabble (Rupert Hill-Hayr) – vocals, drums
- Jamie Rabble (Jamie Douglass) – bass, vocals

== Discography ==
=== Studio albums ===
- No Clue, No Future (March 2006)
- The Battle's Almost Over (February 2007)
- The New Generation (December 2008)
- Life's A Journey (August 2011)

=== EPs ===
- This Is Our Lives (November 2006)
