= Nocturnes (short story collection) =

2009 book by Kazuo Ishiguro

- First edition
- Author: Kazuo Ishiguro
- Language: English
- Genre: Short story collection
- Publisher: Faber and Faber
- Publication date: 7 May 2009
- Publication place: United Kingdom
- Media type: Print (hardback)
- Pages: 221 pp
- ISBN: 978-0-571-24498-0
- OCLC: 310156229

Nocturnes: Five Stories of Music and Nightfall is a 2009 collection of short fiction by Kazuo Ishiguro. After six novels, it is Ishiguro's first collection of short stories, though it is described by the publisher as a "story cycle". As the subtitle suggests, each of the five stories focuses on music and musicians, and the close of day. The hardback was published by Faber and Faber in the United Kingdom on 7 May 2009 and in the United States by Knopf in September 2009.

== Stories ==
As the subtitle suggests, each story focuses on music and musicians, and the close of day. All of the stories have unfulfilled potential as a linking theme, tinged with elements of regret. The second and fourth stories have comic undertones. The first and final stories feature cafe musicians, and the first and fourth stories feature the same character. All five stories have unreliable male narrators and are written in the first person.

- "Crooner"
  - Set in Venice, a fading American singer co-opts a Polish cafe musician into accompanying him while he serenades his wife (whose relationship is disintegrating) from a gondola.
- "Come Rain or Come Shine"
  - In London, an expatriate EFL teacher is invited to the home of a couple whom he knew whilst at university. However the couple's tensions affect the visitor, leading to a rather awkward situation.
- "Malvern Hills"
  - A young guitarist flees London and lack of success in the rock world to the Malvern countryside cafe owned by his sister and brother-in-law. Whilst there he encounters Swiss tourists whose behaviour causes him to reflect on his own situation.
- "Nocturne"
  - A saxophonist recuperating after plastic surgery at a Beverly Hills hotel becomes involved with a wealthy American woman (the now ex-wife of the crooner in the first story) and ends up in a rather bizarre confrontation on stage of the hotel (involving an award statuette and a cooked turkey).
- "Cellists"
  - A Hungarian cellist falls under the spell of a fellow cellist, an apparently virtuosic American older woman, who tutors him. He later realises that she cannot play the cello as she was so convinced of her own musical genius, no teacher ever seemed equal to it, and so rather than tarnish her gift with imperfection, she chose never to realise it at all.

== Reception ==
Robert Macfarlane writes in The Sunday Times that "Closing the book, it’s hard to recall much more than an atmosphere or an air; a few bars of music, half-heard, technically accomplished, quickly forgotten." Christian House of The Independent writes that "Ultimately this is a lovely, clever book about the passage of time and the soaring notes that make its journey worthwhile".
