= Rachel Ward =

British-Australian actress and filmmaker (b. 1957)

Rachel Ward AM
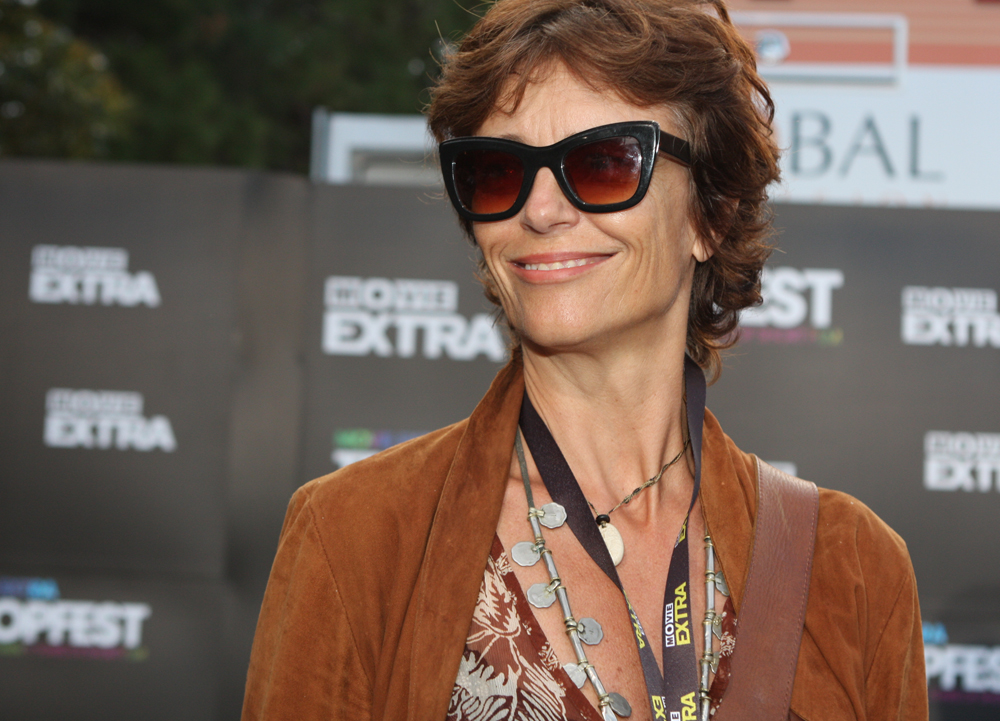
- Ward in 2012
- Born: Rachel Claire Ward; 12 September 1957 (age 69); England
- Citizenship: United Kingdom; Australia (since 1986)
- Education: Byam Shaw School of Art
- Occupations: Actress; film director; television director; screenwriter
- Years active: 1979–present
- Spouse: Bryan Brown (m. 1983)
- Children: 3, including Matilda Brown
- Relatives: Tracy, Duchess of Beaufort (sister)
- Awards: See below

Rachel Claire Ward AM (born 12 September 1957) is a British and Australian actress and filmmaker. She gained recognition as an actress for her performance in the American television miniseries The Thorn Birds (1983), which earned her one of three Golden Globe Award nominations.

Her other notable films include Sharky's Machine (1981), Dead Men Don't Wear Plaid (1982), and Against All Odds (1984). Her 2009 film Beautiful Kate earned her AACTA Award nominations for Best Direction and Best Screenplay. Ward is married to actor Bryan Brown and the mother of actress Matilda Brown.

== Early life and education ==
Rachel Claire Ward was born in England on 12 September 1957. She is the eldest daughter of Claire and Peter Alistair Ward, who was the third son of William Ward, 3rd Earl of Dudley. Her great-grandfather, William Ward, 2nd Earl of Dudley, was Governor-General of Australia 1908-11. Ward's younger sister, Tracy Louise Ward, former Duchess of Beaufort, is a former actress and an environmental campaigner.

Ward grew up in Cornwell Manor, in Cornwell, Oxfordshire, which her parents bought in 1959, and remains in the hands of the Ward family as of January 2026.

Ward's parents divorced when she was twelve, and both remarried. Her father had two sons; Alexander inherited the manor after his death in 2009. Ward's mother became the long-term partner of Lord Lambton, a Conservative Party MP whose career ended when he was embroiled in a scandal with prostitutes.

Ward attended Hatherop Castle School, Hatherop, Gloucestershire. then the Byam Shaw School of Art in Kensington, West London. She left school at age 16 to become a fashion and photography model.

== Career ==
During her modelling career, Ward was featured on the covers of Vogue, Harper's & Queen, and Cosmopolitan magazines. After moving to the United States in 1977, she appeared in television advertisements such as the Lincoln Mercury "Cougar Girl" and Revlon's "Scoundrel Girl". Time referred to her as "the face of the 80s"..

In 1981, she was nominated for a Golden Globe Award as "New Star of the Year" for her role in the crime drama film Sharky's Machine starring with Burt Reynolds. The following year, she starred in the comedy Dead Men Don't Wear Plaid with Steve Martin. Her big break came in 1983, when she starred opposite Richard Chamberlain in the lead role portraying Meggie Cleary in the television miniseries The Thorn Birds, for which she was nominated for a Golden Globe Award for Best Actress – Miniseries or Television Film. Ward assigns much of the credit for this breakthrough performance to acting coach Sandra Seacat, first for simply helping her get the job (after her disastrous first reading) and then for the quality of the finished performance, assembled over the course of a gruelling five-month shooting schedule, while undergoing a simultaneous and no less gruelling makeover programme at the hands of Seacat. Also in 1983, U.S. audiences voted Ward one of the world's 10 most beautiful women. In 1984, she played Jess in the film noir remake Against All Odds, with Jeff Bridges and James Woods. After filming Fortress in 1985, Ward then disappeared from film for a few years to study acting.

She reappeared in 1987 playing opposite her husband, Bryan Brown (whom she met on the set of The Thorn Birds), in The Umbrella Woman. In 2001, she was again nominated for the Golden Globe Award for Best Actress – Miniseries or Television Film for her role in On the Beach (2000). Also in 2001, Ward won the Australian Film Institute Award for Best Short Fiction Film for The Big House, and Best Australian Film at Flickerfest. The film also won the Film Critics Circle of Australia award, as did her 2003 film Martha's New Coat. That film also won the 2003 ATOM Award.

In 2006, Ward acted in Kevin Connor's mini-series Blackbeard, made for the Hallmark Channel.

In 2007, Ward returned to television, headlining the new ABC drama Rain Shadow. She played a country veterinarian named Kate McDonald, a free spirit who confronts personal and professional obstacles in a rural, drought-affected town.

In 2009, she directed her first feature-length film titled Beautiful Kate, which she adapted from a 1982 Newton Thornburg novel. It premiered at the Sydney Film Festival, where it was nominated for Best Film. It subsequently earned Ward AACTA Award nominations for Best Direction and Best Screenplay.

Ward runs a farm with her family in rural New South Wales. The farm was the subject of a 2023 documentary, Rachel's Farm, which Ward co-directed.

== Recognition and honours ==
External images
- 1970s photo of Ward with Peter Cook by Michael White, The Daily Telegraph
- Portrait of Rachel Ward by Jan Williamson

In 2003, a portrait of Ward by artist Jan Williamson won the Packing Room Prize at the Archibald Prize competition.

In 2005, Ward was made a Member of the Order of Australia "for service to raising awareness of social justice through lobbying, mentoring and advocacy for the rights of disadvantaged and at-risk young people, and support for the Australian film and television industry".

== Personal life ==
As a young woman, Ward briefly dated David Kennedy, son of Robert F. Kennedy. Ward married Australian actor Bryan Brown in 1983. They have three children, including Matilda.

She became an Australian citizen around 1986.

== Filmography ==
=== Actress ===
==== Film ====
Year	Title	Role	Type
1981	Night School	Eleanor Adjai	
1981	Sharky's Machine	Dominoe	
1982	Dead Men Don't Wear Plaid	Juliet Forrest	
1983	The Final Terror	Margaret	Filmed in 1981
1984	Against All Odds	Jessie Wyler	
1987	Hotel Colonial	Irene Costa	
1987	The Umbrella Woman	Marge Hills	
1989	How to Get Ahead in Advertising	Julia Bagley	
1990	After Dark, My Sweet	Fay Anderson	
1992	Christopher Columbus: The Discovery	Isabella I of Castile	
1992	Double Obsession	Grandmother	
1993	Wide Sargasso Sea	Annette Cosway	
1994	The Ascent	Patricia	
2007	Shotgun! [An Opening Sequence]	Adrianna	Short film
2011	Free Rain	Herself	Documentary
2013	The Last Impresario	Interviewee	Documentary
2016	The Death and Life of Otto Bloom	Ada Fitzgerald	
2018	Peter Rabbit	Josephine Rabbit (voice)	
2020	I Am Burt Reynolds	Herself	Documentary
2023	Rachel’s Farm	Herself	Documentary; also director
2026	Whale Shark Jack	Aunty Dot	

==== Television ====
Year	Title	Role	Notes
1979	Christmas Lilies of the Field	Jenny	TV movie
1981	Dynasty	Edna Macready	Episode "The Dinner Party"
1983	The Thorn Birds	Meghan 'Meggie' Cleary	Miniseries
1985	Fortress	Sally Jones	TV movie
1988	Mike Willessee's Australians	Vivian Bullwinkel	Episode "Vivian Bullwinkel"
1989	Shadow of the Cobra	Chris Royston	Miniseries
1991	And the Sea Will Tell	Jennifer Jenkins	TV movie
1992	Black Magic	Lillian Blatman	TV movie
1992	Double Jeopardy	Lisa Burns Donnelly	TV movie
1996	Twisted Tales	Sara	Episode "Third Party"
1997	My Stepson, My Lover	Caitlin Cory / Wife	TV movie
1999	Seasons of Love	Kate Linthorne	Miniseries
2000	On the Beach	Moira Davidson	TV movie
2001	And Never Let Her Go	Christine Sheve	TV movie
2002	Bobbie's Girl	Roberta Langham	TV movie
2002	Johnson County War	Queenie	TV movie
2006	Blackbeard	Sally Dunbar	Miniseries
2006	Monarch Cove	Arianna Preston	14 episodes
2007	Rain Shadow	Kate McDonald	6 episodes
2022	Darby and Joan	English Sat Nav	1 episode

=== Filmmaker ===
==== Film ====
Year	Title	Director	Writer	Notes
2000	Blindman's Bluff	Yes	Yes	Short film
2001	The Big House	Yes	Yes	Short film
2003	Martha's New Coat	Yes	No	
2009	Beautiful Kate	Yes	Yes	
2019	Palm Beach	Yes	Yes	
2023	Rachel’s Farm	Yes	Yes	Documentary

==== Television ====
Year	Title	Notes
2006	Two Twisted	Episode: "Heart Attack"
2006	Knot at Home Project	Documentary series
2010	Rake	Episodes: "R vs Dana", "R vs Lorton"
2011	My Place	3 episodes
2012	The Straits	3 episodes
2013	An Accidental Soldier	TV movie
2014	Devil's Playground	3 episodes

== Theatre credits ==
Ward's stage performances include:

Year	Title	Type	Venue	Notes
1989	A Doll’s House		Ensemble Theatre, Sydney	
1990	Hopping to Byzantium	Jessica Fox	Ensemble Theatre, Sydney	
1997	Keyboard Skills		Ensemble Theatre, Sydney	
1998	The Piccadilly Bushman	Meg Ritchie	Malthouse Theatre, Melbourne	with Playbox Theatre Company

== Awards and nominations ==
Institution	Year	Category	Work	Result
AACTA Awards	2001	Best Short Fiction Film	The Big House	Won
AACTA Awards	2001	Best Screenplay in a Short Film	The Big House	Nominated
AACTA Awards	2009	Best Direction	Beautiful Kate	Nominated
AACTA Awards	2009	Best Screenplay, Adapted	Beautiful Kate	Nominated
AACTA Awards	2014	Best Direction in Television	An Accidental Soldier	Nominated
Antipodean Film Festival	2010	Best Feature Film	Beautiful Kate	Nominated
Australian Directors' Guild	2009	Best Direction in a Feature Film	Beautiful Kate	Nominated
Australian Directors' Guild	2012	Best Direction in a Children's TV Program	My Place	Nominated
Australian Directors' Guild	2014	Best Direction in a Telemovie	An Accidental Soldier	Nominated
Film Critics Circle of Australia Awards	2010	Best Director	Beautiful Kate	Nominated
Film Critics Circle of Australia Awards	2024	Best Documentary Feature	Rachel's Farm	Won
Golden Globe Awards	1982	New Star of the Year – Actress	Sharky's Machine	Nominated
Golden Globe Awards	1984	Best Actress – Miniseries or Television Film	The Thorn Birds	Nominated
Golden Globe Awards	2001	Best Actress – Miniseries or Television Film	On the Beach	Nominated
Palm Springs International Film Festival	2010	New Voices Grand Jury Prize	Beautiful Kate	Nominated
Santa Barbara International Film Festival	2023	Best Documentary Film	Rachel's Farm	Nominated
Sydney Film Festival	2009	Best Film	Beautiful Kate	Nominated
Sydney Film Festival	2023	Best Documentary Film	Rachel's Farm	Nominated
Sydney Film Festival	2023	Sustainable Future Award	Rachel's Farm	Nominated
Tokyo International Film Festival	1987	Best Actress	The Umbrella Woman	Won
