= Bryan Brown =

Australian actor (born 1947)

Bryan Brown AM
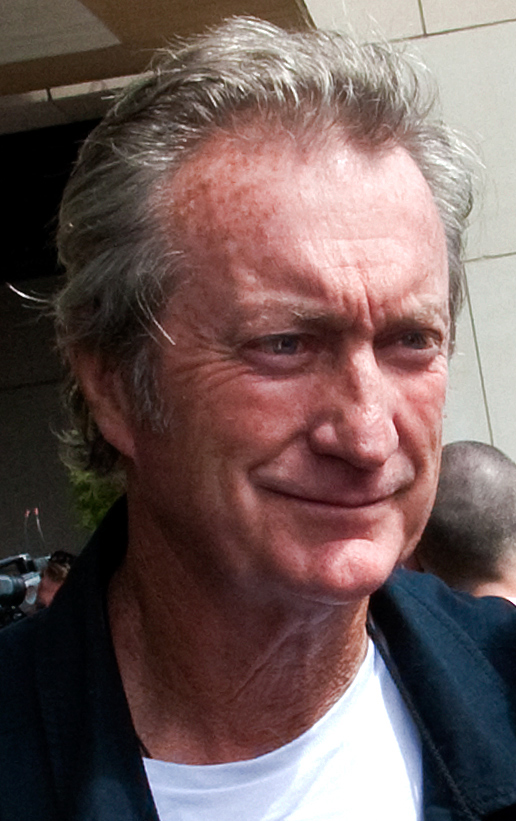
- Brown at the 2009 Toronto International Film Festival
- Born: Bryan Neathway Brown; 23 June 1947 (age 79); Panania, New South Wales, Australia
- Occupation: Actor
- Years active: 1972–present
- Spouse: Rachel Ward (m. 1983)
- Children: 3, including Matilda

Bryan Neathway Brown AM (born 23 June 1947) is an Australian actor. He has performed in over eighty film and television projects since the late 1970s, both in his native Australia and abroad. Notable films include Breaker Morant (1980), Give My Regards to Broad Street (1984), F/X (1986), Tai-Pan (1986), Cocktail (1988), Gorillas in the Mist (1988), F/X2 (1991), Along Came Polly (2004), Australia (2008), Kill Me Three Times (2014) and Gods of Egypt (2016). He was nominated for a Golden Globe Award and an Emmy Award for his performance in the television miniseries The Thorn Birds (1983).

== Early life ==
Brown was born in Panania, a south-western Sydney suburb, the son of salesman John "Jack" Brown and Molly Brown, a pianist in the early days of the Langshaw School of Ballet and a drama student at the Edith Paull Drama School, who also worked as a house cleaner. He grew up with his younger sister, Kristine, in Panania, and began working at AMP as an actuarial student. He started to act in amateur theatre performances, where he discovered a passion for acting.

== Career ==
=== Theatre ===
Brown went to Britain in 1972 and eventually won minor roles at the Old Vic. He returned to Australia and became a member of the Genesian Theatre, Sydney. He appeared in Colleen Clifford's production of A Man for All Seasons, before joining the Queensland Theatre Company in 1975 for a tour of The Rainmaker.

=== Early films ===
He made his cinema debut in Scobie Malone (1975) as a policeman. He delivered two lines and was listed last in the credits as "Brian Bronn".

In 1977, he had the lead in a short feature, The Love Letters from Teralba Road (1977), which was written and directed by Stephen Wallace.

Brown had small roles in The Irishman (1978), which was directed by Donald Crombie, Weekend of Shadows (1978) from Tom Jeffrey, and The Chant of Jimmie Blacksmith (1978), which was directed by Fred Schepisi.

He had a bigger part in Newsfront (1978), which was directed by Phillip Noyce, the miniseries Against the Wind (1978), which was directed by Simon Wincer, and Money Movers (1978), which was directed by Bruce Beresford.

Brown had the lead in the low budget film Third Person Plural (1979) from James Ricketson and a key role in Jeffrey's The Odd Angry Shot (1979) and Crombie's Cathy's Child (1979). He played the lead in a short for Wallace, Conman Harry and the Others (1979), and had a leading role in Albie Thoms' Palm Beach (1980).

In 1980, Brown became known to international audiences for his performance in Breaker Morant, directed by Beresford. This was a significant turning point in his career.

=== Stardom ===
Brown played the leading role in Wallace's Stir (1980). He had starring roles in Blood Money (1980), a thriller, and Winter of Our Dreams (1981), a relationship drama with Judy Davis written and directed by John Duigan.

Brown had a huge international success playing the lead role in the TV miniseries, "A Town Like Alice" (1981), which won popularity in the United States. This co-starred Helen Morse and the two of them were reteamed in Far East (1982), written and directed by Duigan.

Brown had another big success internationally with his role as Luke O'Neil in The Thorn Birds (1983), starring Richard Chamberlain and Rachel Ward (whom he later married). Brown was nominated for the Golden Globe Award for Best Supporting Actor – Series, Miniseries or Television Film and the Primetime Emmy Award for Outstanding Supporting Actor – Miniseries or a Movie for his work.

This led to a number of international offers for Brown. He had the lead in a British TV film, Kim (1984) (playing a British agent in Imperial India) and supported Paul McCartney in Give My Regards to Broad Street (1984).

Brown returned to Australia for another miniseries from the makers of Alice, as Peter Lalor in Eureka Stockade (1984).

In the UK, Brown played an Australian hitman in Parker (1984) and he returned home to play Cliff Hardy in The Empty Beach (1985). He supported Matt Dillon and Debra Byrne in Rebel (1985).

=== US career ===
Brown was given the lead role in the US action film F/X (1986), which was a hit. However Tai-Pan (1986), directed by Daryl Duke from The Thorn Birds, was not a financial success, despite being based on a best seller by James Clavell.

Brown returned to Australia to make The Umbrella Woman (1987) with Ward and then a new version of The Shiralee (1987). He supported Tom Cruise in Cocktail (1988) and Sigourney Weaver in Gorillas in the Mist (1989).

In Australia he played the lead in a World War Two drama, Blood Oath (1990), directed by Wallace and did a romantic comedy based on a story by him and Tony Morphett, Sweet Talker (1991), directed by Mike Jenkins.

In the US he did F/X2 (1991), a sequel to F/X, where he was also executive producer, and the TV film Dead in the Water (1991).

He did a comedy with Dudley Moore, Blame It on the Bellboy (1992), followed by some thrillers: Devlin (1992), The Last Hit (1993), and Age of Treason (1994); in the latter he was a detective in Ancient Rome.

Brown had the lead in a short lived British TV series The Wanderer (1994) and starred in the popular cable film Full Body Massage (1995).

=== Return to Australia ===
Brown returned to Australia to star in Dead Heart (1996), which he also produced. He produced and starred in Twisted Tales (1996) which led to an anthology TV series. He played Ned Land in the 1997 miniseries 20,000 Leagues Under the Sea with Michael Caine, then did a TV film for Ken Russell, Dogboys (1998) and a thriller On the Border (1998). In 1999 Brown starred in the romantic comedy Dear Claudia and had a support role in Two Hands (1999) with Heath Ledger and Rose Byrne.

Brown starred in Grizzly Falls (1999), and Journey to the Center of the Earth (1999). In Australia he had a support role in Risk (2000) and the lead in On the Beach (2000) and Dirty Deeds (2002) which he also produced. He produced a short film by his wife, The Big House (2001). Brown had support roles in Footsteps (2003), Along Came Polly (2004), Revenge of the Middle-Aged Woman (2005), Spring Break Shark Attack (2005), and The Poseidon Adventure (2005). He produced a short feature directed by his wife, Martha's New Coat (2005) and made Two Twisted (2005). Back in Australia Brown was in Joanne Lees: Murder in the Outback (2007), and Cactus (2008), which he also co produced. He was in Dean Spanley (2008), and had a small role in Australia (2008).

Brown produced and had a small role in Beautiful Kate (2009), directed by his wife. He was in Limbo (2010) and Love Birds (2011) and guest starred on The Good Wife. He had the lead in Better Man (2013) and appeared in An Accidental Soldier (2013) also directed by his wife. He and his daughter did a series of shorts, Lessons from the Grave (2013). He starred in the ghost film The Darkside (2013) and had the lead in a TV series Old School (2013). In 2014 he appeared on stage for the Sydney Theatre Company at the Wharf Theatre with Alison Whyte in David Williamson's play Travelling North.

He was in Kill Me Three Times (2013), Cocktails & Dreams (2015), Deadline Gallipoli (2015), Gods of Egypt (2015), The Light Between Oceans (2016), and Red Dog: True Blue (2016). He had roles in Australia Day (2017), and Sweet Country (2017) and is in Palm Beach directed by his wife, and the 2019 TV series Bloom.

Brown appeared in the opening ceremony of the 2018 Commonwealth Games on the Gold Coast.

In June 2024, Brown would return to Darby and Joan (TV series) after the show was renewed for a second series.

=== Writing ===
His 2021 crime novel, Sweet Jimmy, was published by Allen & Unwin in print and as audio book, narrated by Brown. Sweet Jimmy was highly praised by film historian and author Brian McFarlane, who called it "an extraordinary piece of work".

His second book, The Drowning, was published in 2023 in print and as audio book, narrated by Brown. Brown published his third book, The Hidden, a crime novel set on the New South Wales North Coast, in 2025.

=== Production work ===
Brown's production company made the series Twisted Tales and Two Twisted (similar to Alfred Hitchcock Presents). The second series had an additional twist: both stories in each episode were connected in some way, and the audience was invited to try to spot the connection.

== Honours and awards ==
Brown was inducted into the Logie Hall of Fame in 1989. He received the Australian Film Institute Award for Best Actor in a Supporting Role for Breaker Morant (1980) and for Two Hands (1999). In 2024, Brown was nominated and won a Logie for Best Supporting Actor for his work in Boy Swallows Universe..

In June 2005, Brown was made a Member of the Order of Australia "for service to the community through a range of charitable organisations committed to providing assistance and support to families and young people and to the Australian film and television industry."

The Bryan Brown Theatre & Function Centre in Bankstown, Sydney, was named after him in 2013. He won Longford Lyell Award at the AACTA Awards in 2018.

== Personal life ==
When Bryan Brown was first introduced to Rachel Ward on the set of the TV miniseries The Thorn Birds in 1983, he read her palm and predicted she would have three children. They married a few months after filming wrapped. They have three children, including Matilda.

He is a strong supporter of Australian republicanism.

== Filmography ==
=== Film ===
Year	Title	Role	Notes
1977	The Love Letters from Teralba Road	Len	Short film
1978	Third Person Plural	Mark	Feature film
1978	The Irishman	Eric Haywood	Feature film
1978	Weekend of Shadows	Bennett	Feature film
1978	The Chant of Jimmie Blacksmith	Shearer	Feature film
1978	Newsfront	Geoff	Feature film
1978	Money Movers	Brian Jackson	Feature film
1979	Cathy's Child	Paul Nicholson	Feature film
1979	The Odd Angry Shot	Rogers	Feature film
1980	Palm Beach	Paul Kite	Feature film
1980	Breaker Morant	Peter Handcock	Feature film AACTA Award for Best Actor in a Supporting Role
1980	Stir	China Jackson	Feature film Nominated for AACTA Award for Best Actor in a Leading Role
1980	Blood Money	Brian Shields	Feature film
1981	Winter of Our Dreams	Rob	Feature film
1982	Far East	Morgan Keefe	Feature film
1984	Give My Regards to Broad Street	Steve	Feature film
1984	Kim	Mahbub Ali	TV film
1984	Parker	David Parker	Feature film
1985	The Empty Beach	Cliff Hardy	Feature film
1985	Rebel	Tiger	Feature film Nominated for AACTA Award for Best Actor in a Supporting Role
1986	F/X	Roland 'Rollie' Tyler	Feature film
1986	Tai-Pan	Dirk Struan	Feature film
1987	The Good Wife (aka The Umbrella Woman)	Sonny Hills	Feature film
1987	The Shiralee	Macauley	TV film
1988	Cocktail	Doug Coughlin	Feature film
1988	Gorillas in the Mist	Bob Campbell	Feature film
1990	Blood Oath (aka Prisoners of the Sun)	Captain Cooper	Feature film
1991	Sweet Talker	Harry Reynolds	Feature film
1991	Dead in the Water	Charlie Deegan	TV film
1991	F/X2	Rollie Tyler	Feature film
1992	Blame It on the Bellboy	Mike Lawton / Charlton Black	
1992	Devlin	Frank Devlin	TV film
1993	Age of Treason	Marcus Didius Falco	TV film
1993	The Last Hit	Michael Grant	TV film
1995	Full Body Massage	Fitch	TV film
1996	Dead Heart	Ray Lorkin	Feature film
1997	20,000 Leagues Under the Sea	Ned Land	TV film
1998	Dogboys	Captain Robert Brown	TV film
1998	On the Border	Barry Montana	TV film
1999	Dear Claudia	Walter Burton	Feature film
1999	Two Hands	Pando	Feature film AACTA Award for Best Actor in a Supporting Role
1999	Grizzly Falls	Tyrone Bankston	Feature film
2000	On the Beach	Julian Osborne	TV film
2001	Risk	John Kriesky	Feature film
2001	Mullet	Publican (voice)	Feature film
2001	Styx	Art	
2002	Dirty Deeds	Barry Ryan	Feature film
2003	Footsteps	Eddie Bruno	TV film
2004	Revenge of the Middle-Aged Woman	Hal Thorne	TV film
2004	Along Came Polly	Leland Van Lew	Feature film
2005	Spring Break Shark Attack	Joel Gately	TV film
2005	The Poseidon Adventure	Jeffrey Eric Anderson	TV film
2006	Two Twisted	Detective Vincent Westler	TV film
2007	Joanne Lees: Murder in the Outback	Rex Wild QC	TV film
2008	Dean Spanley	Wrather	Feature film
2008	Cactus	Rosco	Feature film
2008	Australia	King Carney	Feature film
2009	Beautiful Kate	Bruce Kendall	Feature film Nominated for AACTA Award for Best Actor in a Supporting Role
2010	Limbo	Daniel	Feature film
2011	Love Birds	Dr Buster	Feature film
2013	An Accidental Soldier	Captain Foster	TV film
2014	Kill Me Three Times	Bruce Jones	Feature film
2016	The Light Between Oceans	Septimus Potts	Feature film
2016	Gods of Egypt	Osiris	Feature film
2016	Red Dog: True Blue	Grandpa	Feature film
2017	Sweet Country	Sergeant Fletcher	Feature film
2017	Australia Day	Terry Friedman	Feature film
2018	Peter Rabbit	Mr Rabbit (voice)	Feature film
2019	Palm Beach	Frank	Feature film (also producer)
2023	Anyone but You	Roger	Feature film
2025	The Travellers	Fred	

=== Television ===
Year	Title	Role	Notes
1978	Against the Wind	Michael Connor	TV miniseries, 2 episodes
1981	A Town Like Alice	Joe Harmon	TV miniseries, 3 episodes
1983	The Thorn Birds	Luke O'Neill	TV miniseries, 3 episodes Nominated – Golden Globe Award for Best Supporting Actor – Series, Miniseries or Television Film; Nominated – Primetime Emmy Award for Outstanding Supporting Actor in a Miniseries or a Movie
1984	Eureka Stockade	Peter Lalor	TV miniseries, 3 episodes
1994	The Wanderer	Adam	TV series, 13 episodes
1996	Twisted Tales	Jack Johnson	TV series, episode: "The Confident Man"
1999	Journey to the Center of the Earth	Casper Hastings	TV miniseries, 2 episodes
2012	The Good Wife	Jack Copeland	TV series, 2 episodes
2013	Better Man	Lex Lasry	TV miniseries, 4 episodes
2014	Old School	Lennie Cahill	TV series, 8 episodes
2015	Let's Talk About		TV series
2019	Halal Gurls	Gordon	ABC iView
2019–2020	Bloom	Ray Reed	TV series, 12 episodes
2020	Hungry Ghosts	Neil Stockton	TV series
2021	The Moth Effect	Ted	TV series, 2 episodes
2022–2025	Darby and Joan	Jack Darby	TV series, 8 episodes
2023	Caught	Warren Whistle	TV series, 8 episodes
2024	Boy Swallows Universe	Slim Halliday	TV miniseries, 7 episodes

== See also ==
- List of Australian film actors
