= Senad Halilbašić =

Bosnian-Austrian screenwriter and film producer

Senad Halilbašić (September 18 1988 in Tuzla, SFR Yugoslavia) is a Bosnian and Austrian author, screenwriter, film producer, dramaturge and theater and cultural scientist. He co-wrote the screenplay with Patrick Vollrath for the 2019 film 7500, starring Joseph Gordon-Levitt.

== Early life ==
Halilbašić was born in what is now Bosnia and Herzegovina and moved with his family to Graz, Austria. In 2008 he moved to the Austrian capital, Vienna, to study theatre, film and media studies at the University of Vienna.

== Career ==
Halilbašić's interest in cinema and dramaturgy dates back to his youth. During his school days, he realized film projects and dealt with literary and textual forms as well as the representation of contemporary history. In 2008 he received the EXIL Literature Prize for the best prose for his story "Heimat", in which he dealt with the limits of integration and assimilation.

=== Filmmaking ===
He gained his first experience on film sets at the Graz youth film club Loom as camera assistant on the 2006 feature film Jenseits.

As a producer, he was responsible for numerous internationally award-winning short films, including projects at the Vienna Film Academy. He produced the short film Unser Lied by young Argentinian director Catalina Molina, which won the Diagonale Kurzfilmpreis 2012 and the Austrian Film Prize 2013, as well as the short film Wir flew (2013), which received a nomination for the First Steps Award.

A connecting project for his cultural studies and film activities was the documentary film Korida (2016), for which he wrote the screenplay with director Siniša Vidović. The film accompanies several protagonists of the Bosnian bullfights, a ritual festival that brings together the different population groups of the crisis-ridden post-war society, which has hitherto rarely been captured on film.

Together with Gerald Igor Hauzenberger, Senad Halilbašić wrote the screenplay for his ORF documentary Hypotopia - The Search for Responsibility (2016), which goes in search of those responsible for the Hypo Alpe Adria bank scandal and the interdependencies between banks, politicians and lobbyists.

He successfully collaborated with director Patrick Vollrath. The short film Alles wird gut (2015), which Halilbašić was in charge of, received the Austrian Film Prize in 2016 and was nominated for the Academy Award for Best Short Film. In 2019, the plane thriller 7500, starring Joseph Gordon-Levitt and co-written by Halilbašić and Vollrath, with Vollrath directing it, had its world premiere at the Locarno Film Festival. For 7500, they were awarded in the Best Screenplay category at the 2021 Austrian Film Awards.

=== Dramaturgical work ===
Since 2010 he has been working for the film production and story development company Witcraft Scenario. There he initially worked as a coordinator of the intercultural script development program Diverse Stories, which he has been in charge of as a dramaturge and script consultant together with Robert Buchschwenter since 2014, and was nominated for the Austrian State Prize for Adult Education in 2010.

The films on which he worked as dramaturge include Attack of the Lederhosen Zombies (2016) and Die Migrantigen (2017), which received the audience award at the Max Ophüls Prize Film Festival in 2017. Halilbašić has held numerous workshops, conferences, training courses in screenwriting, dramaturgy, story development, etc. Graduated from Robert McKee, Helen Jacey, Guillermo Arriaga, Maren Ade.

=== Theory research ===
Senad Halilbašić studied theatre, film and media studies at the University of Vienna, where he graduated. He was then offered a position as a university assistant at the Institute for Theater, Film and Media Studies where he worked parallel to his doctoral studies. Between 2011 and 2013 he worked as a freelance cultural scientist on Sarajevo's literature and, together with Ingo Starz, edited the Sarajevo Library Anthology: Literary survey of a city (Drava, 2012), which received the honorary award of the Sarajevo Book Fair 2013. Halilbašić also wrote the radio feature Burning Memory: The dead books of Sarajevo in collaboration with Starz (WDR/RBB, 2012). In 2015 he was co-organizer of the Theater during the Yugoslav Wars conference, which resulted in an international research network on theater phenomena of the time.

In 2019 Halilbašić received his doctorate with the work "The players and the spectators as well as a grenade that is far enough away." - Theater in Bosnia and Herzegovina 1992 to 1995. As part of his dissertation, Halilbašić conducted basic theater historiographical research on the activities of institutional theaters in Bosnia and Herzegovina during the Bosnian War from 1992 to 1995. He examined the activities of theater institutions and the functions of state theater institutions and the resulting forms of theater in four Bosnian and Herzegovinian cities through a one-year research stay in Bosnia and Herzegovina, Serbia and Croatia. His field research in this area represents the first on-site collection and translation of primary material (video recordings of performances, edited versions, programme, reviews; discussions with contemporary witnesses working in theatre). In his analysis, he used interdisciplinary research approaches from theater studies, Southern Slavic studies, oral history and Southeast European history. On this basis, he developed a study of the functions of theater at the time of the Bosnian War.

From 2019 to 2021 Halilbašić held a position as university assistant and postdoc for South Slavic literature and cultural studies at the University of Vienna.

He regularly publishes texts in RAY (film magazine) and Theater der Zeit, and is a member of the board of directors of the interdisciplinary research group Akademie an der Grenz.

== Filmography ==
=== Screenwriter ===
- 2022: Souls
- 2021: Me, We
- 2019: 7500
- 2016: Hypotopia – Die Suche nach Verantwortung
- 2016: Korida

=== Producent ===
- 2016: Las Meninas
- 2015: Wenn's kalt wird
- 2013: Wir fliegen
- 2012: Florida
- 2012: Unser Lied

=== Dramaturgy ===
- 2017: Die Migrantigen
- 2016: Angriff der Lederhosenzombies
- 2015: Alles wird gut

== Publications ==
=== Author ===
- Bosnia and Herzegovina's National Theatres in the Context of Language Politics During the War. In: Jana Dolečki, Senad Halilbašić & Stefan Hulfeld (Hrsg.): Theatre in the Context of the Yugoslav Wars. Palgrave Macmillan, Basel 2018, ISBN 978-3-319-98893-1, S. 63–81.
- Alphabet der Zensur (gemeinsam mit Jan Klata, Dorte Lena Eilers). In: ITI Jahrbuch, 2017, S. 49–57.
- Dieses Theater hütet und schützt vor der Angst wie ein warmer Mutterleib. – Oder auch nicht. Neuverortungen der Funktionen von Theatergebäuden im Bosnienkrieg. In: Birgit Peter, Gabriele C. Pfeiffer (Hrsg.): Flucht – Migration – Theater: Dokumente und Positionen. V&R unipress, Göttingen 2017, ISBN 978-3-8471-0667-8, S. 389–397.
- Primitiver Herrscher im Frack: Krisen, Kriege, Theater – und Trump: Zur 56. Ausgabe des Theaterfestivals MESS in Sarajevo, In: Theater der Zeit, Jg. 2016, Nr. 12, ISSN 0040-5418, S. 32–33.
- Geteilte Stadt, geteiltes Theater, In: Theater der Zeit, Jg. 2015, Nr. 11, ISSN 0040-5418, S. 48–48.
- In Zeiten wie diesen... Zwanzig Jahre Kriegstheater in Sarajevo, In: Theater der Zeit, Jg. 2012, Nr. 12, ISSN 0040-5418, S. 40–42.

=== Editor ===
- Theatre in the Context of the Yugoslav Wars (gemeinsam mit Jana Dolečki & Stefan Hulfeld). Palgrave Macmillan, Basel 2018, ISBN 978-3-319-98893-1.
- Bibliothek Sarajevo: Literarische Vermessung einer Stadt (gemeinsam mit Ingo Starz). Drava, Klagenfurt/Celovec 2012, ISBN 978-3-85435-682-0.
