= Lindsay Farris =

Australian Māori actor, writer and musician

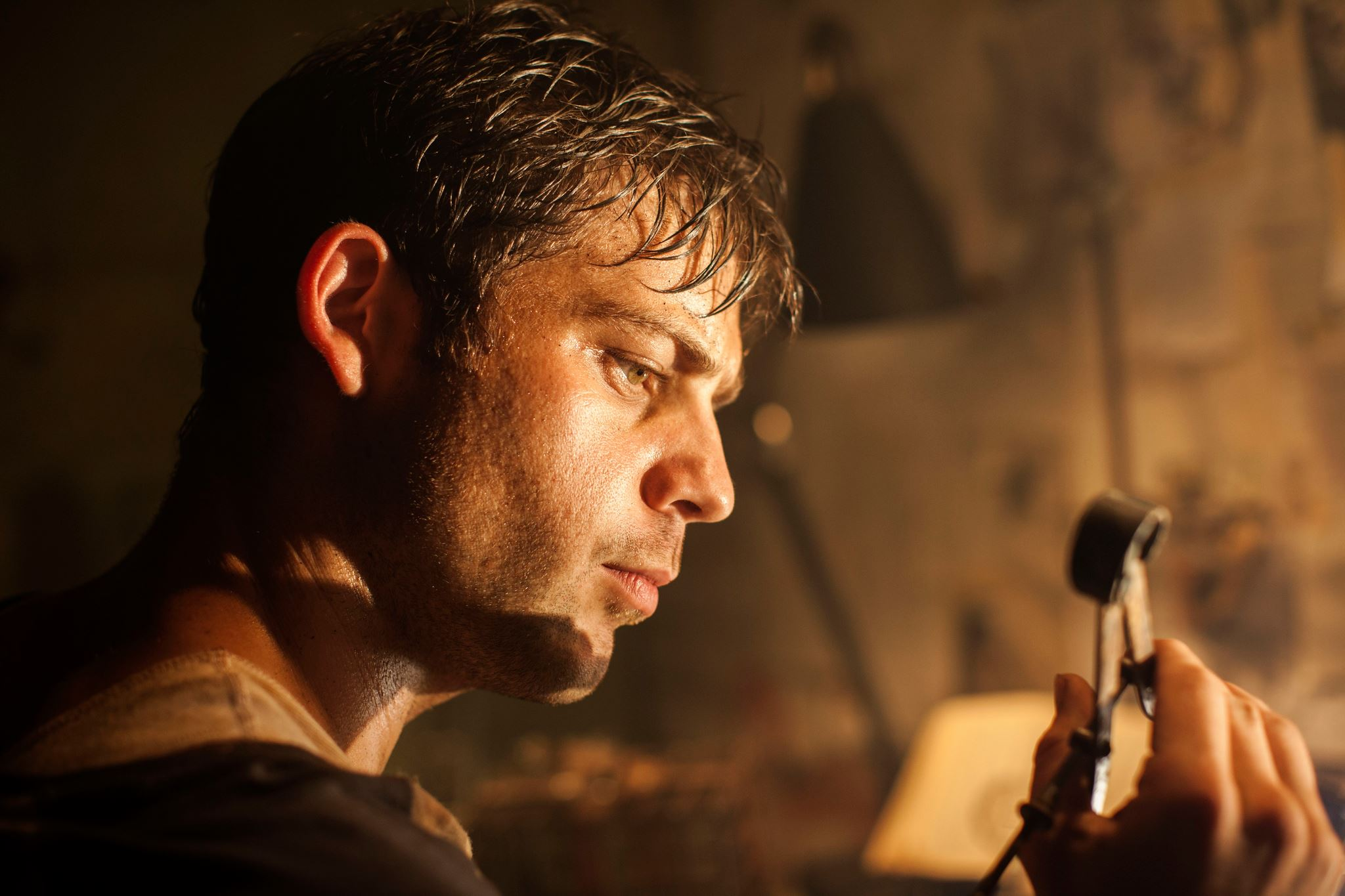
- Farris in 2013
- Born: 18 October 1985 (age 41); Sydney, Australia
- Occupations: Actor; author; director; musician
- Years active: 2002–present

Lindsay Farris is an Australian Māori actor, writer, producer, and musician.

== Career ==
=== Stage work ===
Farris has worked for several Australian theatre companies, including the Sydney Theatre Company, La Boite Theatre Company, Ensemble Theatre, Belvoir, The Production Company, and Christine Dunstan Productions.

Farris' theater credits include the critically acclaimed title role of Hamlet in the Sport For Jove Theatre Company production at the Seymour Centre, for which he received a 2012 Sydney Theatre Award nomination for Best Actor in a Leading Role in an Independent Production. In 2011, he appeared in the Australian premiere of Anthony Neilson's play Edward Gant's Amazing Feats of Loneliness, a co-production between the Sydney Theatre Company and La Boite Theatre Company.

Farris appeared as Dakin in the Alan Bennett play The History Boys at the Sydney Opera House.

In May 2013, Farris reprised his role of Hamlet in Sport For Jove Theatre Company's return season of the play. Farris appeared in Noises Off and Mojo, both for the Sydney Theatre Company.

Farris was the founder and artistic director of the National Youth Theatre Company.

=== Film and television ===
Farris appeared in Peter Templeman's 2005 short film Splintered, which won the Grand Jury Prize for Best Narrative Short at the Slamdance Film Festival in 2005.

In 2009, Farris appeared in Reneé Hernandez’s short film The Ground Beneath, which was nominated for the Academy Award for Best Live Action Short Film.

Farris starred in the Joseph Sims feature film Bad Behaviour alongside John Jarratt. The film was selected as the closing night feature for the 2010 Melbourne Underground Film Festival and received five awards including Best Actor for Farris.

In 2010, Farris worked alongside Sunny Abberton to develop a documentary on youth theatre in Australia. Farris is also executive director of the Australian Ministry of Theatre, a company that supports theatre actors.

In 2015, Farris worked on Gods of Egypt for Lionsgate Entertainment. Prior to this, Farris appeared in the Australian component of Geography of the Heart. He also worked on Alan Ball's HBO show Virtuoso and appeared as Dom Loneragan on Home and Away for the Seven Network. Farris co-produced and starred in Observance, Joseph Sims-Dennett's second feature film.

In 2017, Farris appeared in the PBS drama Mercy Street for Scott Free Productions and as Carl Logan in Sisters for Endemol Shine Australia.

In 2018, he appears as Dalton in Ash vs Evil Dead.

In 2019, he appeared in CJZ's My Life Is Murder for Acorn TV and Network 10.

=== Directing and writing ===
Farris has taught at Newtown High School of the Performing Arts and has worked with students in performing arts at primary, secondary and tertiary schools across Australia including the National Institute of Dramatic Art and the Western Australian Academy of Performing Arts.

Farris is a regular lecturer at intensive education programs, including the New South Wales (NSW) State Drama Camp, NSW Riverina School's Drama Camp, Big Day Out, National Institute of Dramatic Art Young Actors Studio, NSW State Drama Company, and NSW State Drama Ensemble.

Farris wrote the screenplay for Untitled Lindsay Farris Project, for which he was shortlisted for the 2018 Screencraft Pilot Launch Competition and was a finalist for the 2019 Inroads Screenwriting Fellowship and Table Read My Screenplay Competition. Farris wrote the stage plays Sugar Bowl and Touch.

Farris is the author of the book A Young Actor's Guide to Becoming a Wanker.

=== Music ===
Farris is a pianist who has performed in the Sydney Opera House, Vanguard, Metro, and The Spanish Club.

== Credits ==
=== Theatre ===
Year	Play	Role	Company
2002	Hello Dolly	Barnaby	The Production Company
2003	Hamlet	Hamlet	National Institute of Dramatic Art
2004	I'm Not Rappaport	Gilley	Ensemble Theatre
2004	Seven Little Australians	Unknown	New theatre
2005	Verbal Combat	Unknown	Brainstorm Productions
2005	Saving Cal and Mindi	Unknown	Brainstorm Productions
2006	Birds of Passage	Unknown	The Street Theatre Company
2007	One in a Hundred	Simon	The Street Theatre Company
2007	Love of the Nightingale	Tereus	National Institute of Dramatic Art
2007	Emergence	Ram	Synarcade
2008	Blowing Whistles	Mark	Focus Theatre / Belvoir St Theatre
2009	The Keeper	Man	Micah Projects
2009	Inside Out	Simon	Christine Dunstan Productions
2009	The Little Dog Laughed	Alex	Ensemble Theatre
2011	Edward Gant's Amazing Feats of Loneliness	Nicholas Ludd	Sydney Theatre Company / La Boite Theatre Company
2012	Hamlet	Hamlet	Sport For Jove Theatre Company
2013	The History Boys	Dakin	The Peach Theatre Company
2013	Hamlet	Hamlet	Sport For Jove Theatre Company
2014	Noises Off	Timothy Allgood	Sydney Theatre Company
2014	Mojo	Baby	Sydney Theatre Company

=== Filmography ===
Year	Film	Production company, director, Role	Type	Notes
2002	All Saints	Nicholas	TV episode	
2003	Marking Time	Student	TV episode	
2003	The Sleepover Club (TV Series)	Burberry Productions, Dir. Kate Woods, Wolf	TV episode	
2003	My Soul Is Too Much Charged	AFTRS, Dir. Justine Gilmer, Harry Winchester	Short Film	
2003	Splintered	Dir. Peter Templeman, Gavin	Short Film	Won Best Actor at the In The Bin Short Film Festival 2005
2003	G.D. Drama	Unknown	Short Film	
2004	Blue Water High	Southern Star Productions, Cal	TV episode	
2004	All Saints	SNO, Dir. Chris Seeto, Wayne	TV episode	
2004	On the Lurk with Roy and H.G.	Hecktown Pty. Ltd., Dir. Adam Blaiklock, Young Bon Scott	Short Film	
2004	Twists of Fate	On The Mark Films, Dir. Mark Eder, Dennis	Feature Film	
2007	Sea Patrol (TV Series)	Sea Patrol Productions, Dir. Geoff Bennett, Simon	TV episode	
2008	The Ground Beneath	Passion Pictures, Dir. Rene Hernandez, Mate	Short Film	
2010	Primal	Primal Films, Dir. Josh Reed, Chad	Feature Film	Nominated for Best Actor at the BLOODFEST FANTASTIQUE FILM FESTIVAL
2010	My Place	Rusty Fig Productions, Dir. Sam Lang, Earl	TV episode	
2010	Rescue: Special Ops	Southern Star, Dir. David Caesar, Shane	TV episode	
2010	Bad Behaviour	Sterling Cinema Australia, Dir. Joseph Sims, Peterson	Feature Film	Received Best Actor award at the Melbourne Underground Film Festival
2011	Crosshairs	17 Degrees South Films, Dir. Mike Hoath, Beau	Short Film	
2011	Geography of the Heart	Sun Productions, Dir. Samantha Rebillet, Tal	Feature Film	
2011	Elixir	Brodie Higgs Productions, Dir. Brodie Higgs, Phillipe	Feature Film	
2011	Paradise Lost	Legendary Pictures / Warner Bros., Dir. Alex Proyas	Feature Film	
2012	Chicom	Amos – Litton-Strain, Dir. Brendon McDonall, Charlie	Short Film	
2012	Agent Provocateur	Sirin Productions, Dir. Sophie Wiesner, Ljubo	Short Film	
2012	Hamlet	Dir. L. Hall, Hamlet	Feature	
2013	Observance	Sterling Cinema Australia, Dir. Joseph Sims, Parker	Feature Film	
2013	Shift	Deceptionworks, Dir. James Croke, Adam	Short Film	
2014	The Code	Playmaker Media, Dir. Shawn Seet, Dean	Television	
2014	Parer's War	Parer's War Pty. Ltd, Dir. Alister Grierson, Max Dupain	Feature Film	
2015	Winter	Cornerstone Pictures, Dir. Ian Watson, Martin Jenkins	Television	
2015	Virtuoso	HBO, Executive Prod. Alan Ball, Elton John, David Furnish, Heinrich Von Faust	Television	
2016	Gods of Egypt	Mystery Clock Cinema, Summit Entertainment, Thunder Road Pictures, Dir. Alex Proyas	Feature Film	
2016	Home and Away	The Seven Network, Dom Loneragan	Television	
2017	Mercy Street	Scott Free Productions, Dir. Laura Innes, Declan Brannan	Television	
2017	Sisters	Endemol Shine, Prod. Imogen Banks, Carl Logan	Television	
2018	Ash vs Evil Dead	Starz, Produced by Sam Raimi, Robert Tapert & Bruce Campbell. Dalton	Television	
2019	My Life is Murder	Network Ten, CJZ	Television	
TBA	R.U.R.	Mystery Clock Cinema, MoJo Global Arts, Alex Proyas. Harry Doman	Feature Film	

== Awards and nominations ==
Year	Award	Category	Work	Role	Result
2004	Bondi Short Film Festival	"Best Actor"	Splintered	Gavin	Won
2005	In The Bin Film Festival	"Best Actor"	Splintered	Gavin	Won
2010	Melbourne Underground Film Festival	"Best Actor"	Bad Behaviour	Peterson	Won
2011	BloodFest Fantastique Film Festival	"Best Actor"	Primal	Chad	Nominated
2012	Sydney Theatre Awards	"Best Actor in an Independent Production"	Hamlet	Hamlet	Nominated
2018	Screencraft Pilot Launch Competition	Best Screenplay	Untitled Lindsay Farris Project	Writer	Finalist
2019	Table Read My Screenplay - Hollywood	Best Screenplay	Untitled Lindsay Farris Project	Writer	Finalist
2019	Inroads Screenwriting Fellowship	Best Feature Film or Television Pilot	Untitled Lindsay Farris Project	Writer	Finalist
