= The New Obsessives =

Artist collective based in Ireland

The New Obsessives is a group of artists focused on reassembling a non-ambiguous cultural experience through the proliferation of art and art propaganda. The collective consists primarily of former members of the Defastenist art movement that was based in Dublin, Ireland. The group's focus is an evolution of the Defastenist Manifesto, and is a direct response to the belief that discourse among artists has become "watery and... inefficient".

== Publications ==
The New Obsessive is the monthly publication edited, written, illustrated and published by members of The New Obsessives. Issue 1 was published August 25, 2009. On May 10, 2011, the monthly online broadsheet format was abandoned for an electronic news agency format, to be updated at more frequent intervals. Contributors have included but are not limited to: Gary Farrelly, David Turpin, Sophie Iremonger, White Trash Peg, Oisin Byrne, Donna Marie O'Donovan, Antoine Gache, J.T.H Paris, Liam Ryan, Gavin Reddin, Jamey Ray Ruppert, Douglas Brodoff, Marina Guinness (under a nom de plume), and Francis Moulinat.

Exclusive interviews of notables include but are not limited to: Mariya Ocher, Yorgos Nikas, Gene Gregorits, Martin Kiefer, Jimmy Dale, Cindy Wilson, Barra O'Brien, and Andrew Bayer

== Exhibitions and works by New Obsessive artists ==
- "Eurotrash!!" Group show, featuring: Sophie Iremonger, Gary Farrelly, David Hoyle, White Trash Peg, Troy Henriksen, Matt Bray. April 2014, White Trash Gallery, LaSalle, IL
- "New Obsessive Walking Tour" Gary Farrelly performance attached to solo show: 19Nov 2011, Galerie Modonov, Dublin, Ireland.listing of tour
- "Permanent Culture Magazine" Fall 2010, artwork by Sophie Iremonger, photography by David Turpin
- GREAT DEVELOPMENT, Gary Farrelly solo show: November 2010, Guerilla Gallery, Dallas, TX
- NEONderthal, Sophie Iremonger solo show: October 2010, THE FABLAB, Berlin, Germany
- Haunted! and The Sweet Used To Be, written and performed by David Turpin
- L'exhibition D'oeuvres des Sauvages et Beauf (White Trash Art Show) Featuring works of White Trash Peg: September 2010, Willows Gallery, Utica, IL
- The non-profit Margin, Featuring works by Gary Farrelly: May 2010 at CentralTrak Gallery, Dallas, TX
- PINK, version 1 and PINK, version 2, Sophie Iremonger solo shows: 2009, Gallery Tacheles, Berlin, Germany
