= Jean Kittson =

Australian comedian

Jean Kittson AM
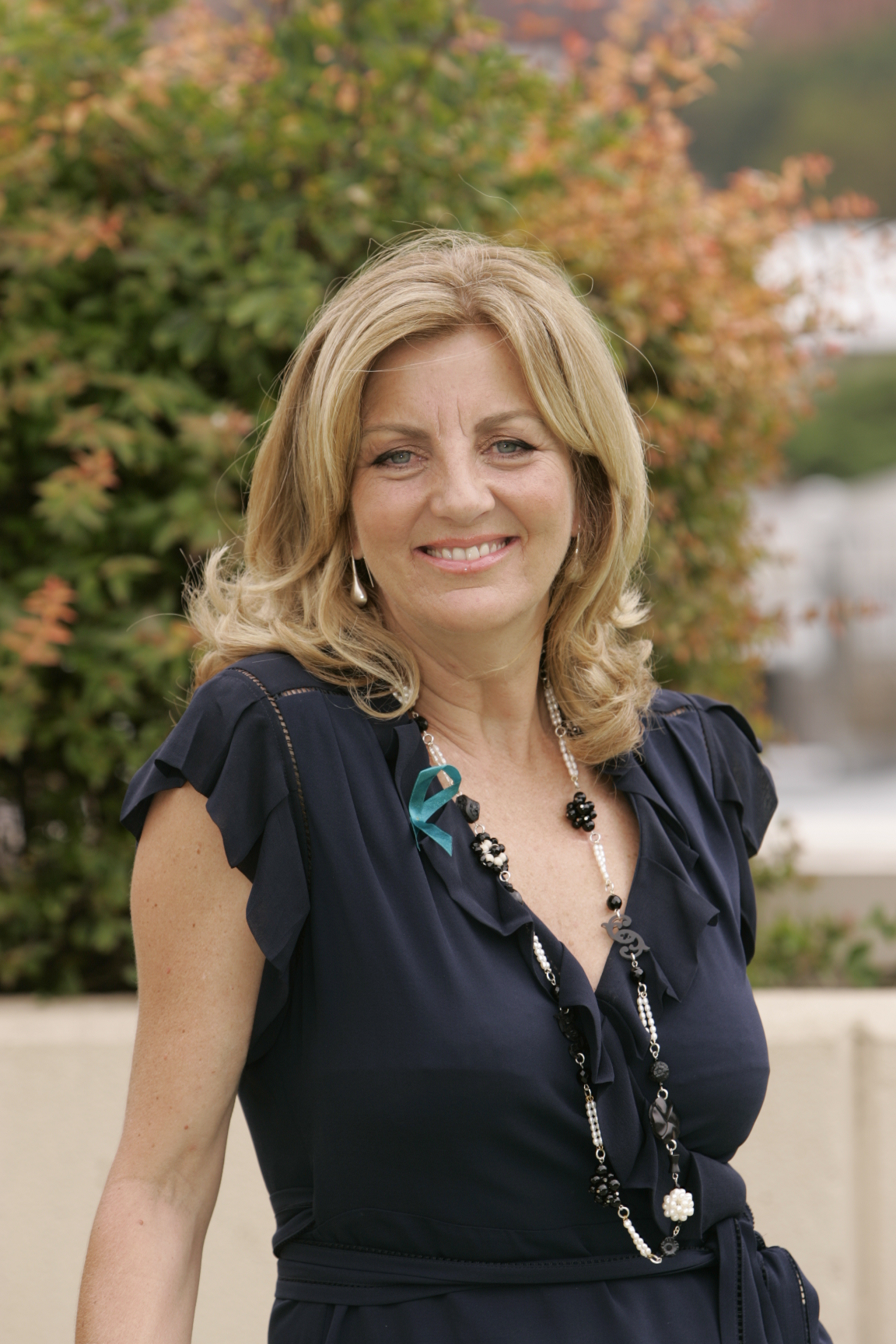
- Kittson launching the 11th Hour Campaign for the 2010 Ovarian Cancer Awareness Month campaign
- Born: Jean Kittson; 1955 (age 70–71); Lilydale, Victoria, Australia
- Spouse: Patrick Cook

Comedy career
- Years active: 1989–present
- Medium: Comedian, television

Jean Kittson AM (born 1955) is an Australian performer, writer and comedian in theatre and print, on radio and television. She made her comedy debut at Melbourne's comedy venue Le Joke in a series of solo performances, and then in the stage version of Let The Blood Run Free.

She came to national attention on The Big Gig. This was followed by Let the Blood Run Free, Kittson Fahey, the Great Debate series as well as Good News Week, The Glasshouse and The Einstein Factor. She is also well known for her lively comedy debates for the ABC, Channel 9 and Channel Ten and was a regular guest on Channel 7's the Morning Show, Channel 9's KAK Show and 20 to One. She has also been a judge on Strictly Speaking and a guest on Talkin' 'Bout Your Generation.

Kittson is a regular guest on TGIF, ABC radio 702, Sydney and has been a regular columnist with New Weekly, Sunday Telegraph, the SMH Sydney Magazine, Inspire Magazine, and the Reader's Digest Health Smart magazine.

She is the author of Tongue Lashing, We Need to Talk About Mum and Dad on supporting ageing parents, and a book on menopause, You're Still Hot To Me.

She was appointed a Member of the Order of Australia in the 2023 Australia Day Honours.

== Television ==
Kittson is best known for her performances, particularly as a news commentator Veronica Glenhuntly, on the ABC1 evening comedy program The Big Gig, which aired in the early 1990s. Kittson also starred in the TV series of Let The Blood Run Free, which was first shown on Network Ten in 1990, and ran for two seasons. Kittson was a regular guest on ABC1's The Einstein Factor and The Glasshouse.

In 2022, Kittson appeared as a contestant on the sixth season of The Celebrity Apprentice Australia.

== Theatre highlights ==
Her first major role was in David Wiliamson's play, Siren in 1990. Her theatre work also includes: A Midsummer Night's Dream; The Night of The Missing Bridegroom; and Behind The Mask. Kittson also performed Love Letters with Glynn Nicholas for the Melbourne Arts Festival and revisited the role in 2003 at the Noosa Arts and Cultural Festival with the late Campbell McComas.

Kitson played a schoolteacher in Delta Blues in 2005.

== Charity work ==
Jean Kittson is an avid supporter of multiple charities and is currently the Chair of the National Gynaecological Cancer Foundation.

In February 2010, Kittson became the official spokesperson for the Ovarian cancer awareness month for Ovarian Cancer Australia, and in 2011 became the official national Afternoon Teal ambassador.

Jean is Patron of The Junction Works - Community Services and an Ambassador for:

- The Macular Disease Foundation Australia
- Northcott Disability Services
- The Raise Foundation – Youth Mentoring
- Taldumande Member Foundation (Taldumande Youth Services) - Homeless youth and families in crisis.
- Palliative Care Nurses Australia

== Cinema ==
In 2010, Kittson appeared in Bad Behaviour, starring Lindsay Farris, John Jarratt and Roger Ward, written and directed by Joseph Sims.

== Personal life ==
She is married to the cartoonist Patrick Cook; they have two daughters.

== Filmography ==
Film
Year	Film	Role	Notes
2002	The Nugget	Joyce	
2005	Hating Alison Ashley	Miss Belmont	
2010	Bad Behaviour	Jane	Appeared in the 2010 Melbourne Underground Film Festival (received five awards) 2011 Cinequest Film Festival in California, 2011 Australian Film Festival, 2011 Another Hole in the Head Festival
Television
Year	Title	Role	Notes
1989	The Big Gig	Writer/actor	
1990–1992	Let The Blood Run Free	Nurse Pam Sandwich	26 episodes
1992–1993	Kittson Fahey	Various characters	
1999–2009	Good News Week	Herself	7 episodes
2000	Gloria's House	Dorothy	26 episodes
2003–2004	The Glass House	Herself	3 episodes
2004–2008	The Einstein Factor	Herself	17 episodes
2011	Swift and Shift	Grace Cox	1 episode
