= Ellen Grimshaw =

Australian actor

- Born: Australia
- Education: Southbank Institute of Technology; Queensland University of Technology; Victorian College of the Arts
- Occupations: Actress, theatre writer
- Years active: 2008–present
- Known for: Neighbours (TV series) as Veronica McLain

Ellen Grimshaw is an Australian actress and writer of theatre. She is known for her roles in films and television dramas. Her performance as Chaar in Bad Behaviour garnered her the "Best Supporting Actress" accolade at the 2010 Melbourne Underground Film Festival. In 2021, she played Casey in the Australian drama series Jack Irish. In 2024, Grimshaw joined the cast of the soap opera Neighbours, playing Veronica McLain.

== Early life ==
Grimshaw began her training at the Southbank Institute of Technology in Brisbane, where she completed a performing arts and acting diploma, graduating in 2006. She then attended the Queensland University of Technology where she graduated from a Fine Arts course in 2009. She then began appearing in independent theatre productions in Brisbane and Melbourne. Grimshaw also developed herself as a writer with a comedic-feminist style and set up permanent residence in Melbourne. In 2018, Grimshaw completed a master's degree in Writing for Performance, which she studied at the Victorian College of the Arts. Grimshaw is a feminist and she later began to develop her views into her performances.

== Career ==
Grimshaw began her professional acting career by starring as Constance in the short film The Covenant of Mr Kasch. She also went onto gain work in numerous television commercials. In 2010, Grimshaw played the role of Chaar in the film Bad Behaviour. Her performance won her the "Best Supporting Actress" accolade at the 2010 Melbourne Underground Film Festival.

In 2018, she played the role of Louise in the web series Everything's Going To Be Fine, which was released via YouTube. In 2019, Grimshaw produced her own theatre show titled "Just us Girls - What's a Girl?!". She designed the show to prove that feminist women are not defined by anger.

In 2020, she appeared as Sarah in the second season of the drama series Bloom, which was broadcast via Stan Grimshaw then played Claire McCormick in the feature film How Do You Know Chris?, which was directed by Ashley Harris. She also appeared in a short film titled Noise. The following year, Grimshaw appeared as Helen in the film Road to Perth, which was later sold to US and Canadian on-demand streaming services. She also produced another theatre show titled "We're Probably Really Really Happy Right Now".

In April 2023, Grimshaw created her own one woman theatre show titled "Grim". She wrote and produced the show and fellow Australian actor Guy Pearce provided voice overs. Later that year she joined the cast of the soap opera Neighbours, playing the role of Veronica McLain. Grimshaw described the character as a "mysterious woman". She made her first appearance in the episode broadcast on 4 January 2024.

== Filmography ==
Year	Title	Role	Notes
2008	The Covenant of Mr Kasch	Constance	Short film
2009	Husk	Wife	Short film
2010	Bad Behaviour	Chaar	Film role
2010	Cops L.A.C.	Alicia	Guest role
2011	Panic at Rock Island	Claire	Film role
2011	Status	Emily	Short film
2011	Julia	Grace	Short film
2012	Jane	Jane	Short film
2013	The Flame Wars	Bec	Film role
2014	Splendor Solis	Angelina	Short film
2014	Basic Basic Instinct	Catherine	Short film
2015	The Super Hero Clean Up Squad	Sky the cashier	TV pilot
2016	Restoration	RLS Technician	Film role
2016	The Wrong Girl	Anouk	Guest role
2018	House Party	Charlie	Short film
2018	Superwog	Formal Babe 1	Guest role
2018	Everything's Going To Be Fine	Louise	Web series
2020	Roger	Rose	Short film
2020	Bloom	Sarah	Guest role
2020	How Do You Know Chris?	Claire McCormick	Film role
2020	Noise	Lead	Short film
2021	Jack Irish	Casey	Recurring role
2021	From Sent Ash to Dancing Ground	Lacheen Lason	Short film
2021	Road to Perth	Helen	Film role
2022	The Newsreader	Naomi	Guest role
2024	Neighbours	Veronica McLain	Guest role

== Awards and nominations ==
Year	Format	Association	Category	Nominated work	Result
2010	Film	Melbourne Underground Film Festival	Best Supporting Actress	Bad Behaviour	Won
2024	Theatre	Green Room Awards	Best Performer in Independent Theatre	Grim	Nominated
