= Son of a Donkey =

2025 Australian comedy television series

- Genre: Comedy
- Created by: Theodore Saidden; Nathan Saidden
- Starring: Theodore Saidden; Nathan Saidden
- Country of origin: Australia
- Original language: English
- No. of seasons: 1
- No. of episodes: 6

Production
- Executive producers: Emma Fitzsimons; Elia Eliades; Laura Walters; Chris Loveall; Nathan Saidden; Theodore Saidden
- Producers: Antje Kulpe; Mike Cowap
- Cinematography: Dan Maxwell
- Editors: Tim Parrington; Ian Carmichael

Original release
- Network: Netflix
- Release: 30 October 2025

Son of a Donkey is an Australian comedy television series created by, written by, and starring Theodore and Nathan Saidden, known for their YouTube channel Superwog. The series premiered globally on Netflix on 30 October 2025. It serves as a continuation of the characters and world established in the duo's previous television series, Superwog.

== Synopsis ==
The series follows Theo as he attempts to move out of his parents' home and transition into independent adulthood. His plans are interrupted by a road rage incident that results in court-ordered therapy. While Theo navigates a full-time job and schemes to retrieve his impounded car, his father faces a health crisis requiring a kidney donor. The narrative explores themes of family dysfunction and daddy issues through a serialized six-episode arc.

== Cast and characters ==
- Theodore Saidden as:
  - Theo, main character.
  - Mom, Theo’s mother.
- Nathan Saidden as:
  - Dad, Theo's aggressive father.
  - Johnny, Theo's best friend.
- Loraine Fabb — Grandma; Theo's grandmother.

=== Recurring cast ===
- Bronwen Coleman as Head Surgeon; Dad's surgeon.
- Matthew Crosby as Psychiatrist Phil; Theo's psychiatrist.
- Marta Kaczmarek as Mother-in-Law; extended family member.
- Kristie Kaczmark as Professor Pawel; eccentric professor.
- Sasha Sutton as Max; recurring rival.
- Serge De Nardo as Father-in-Law; extended family member.
- Jack Sandle as Charming Man; charismatic stranger.
- Sara Ellis Holland as Police Officer 2.
- Myles Pollard as Edward the Executive; corporate executive.
- Terry Yeboah as Prince Mandokka; online prince.
- Margaret Mills as Magistrate; court official.
- Paul McCarthy as Bank Manager; bank employee.
- Andrew Dang as Teller; bank employee.
- Mark Mitchell as Car Dealer George; car dealer.
- Toby Derrick as Douchebag Dave; obnoxious character.
- Sotiris Tzelios as Cosmetic Surgeon; doctor.
- Daniel Reader as Brad the Built Man; muscular character.

=== Guest cast ===
- Sally McLean as Karen the Receptionist; receptionist.
- Will Bennett as Police Assistant; police staff member.
- Bonnie Elvin as Colleague #1; workplace colleague.
- Mert Egerc as Gerald; minor character.
- Andrew Drava as Colleague #2; workplace colleague.
- Michael M. Foster as Neighbour; family neighbour.
- Bella Peachy as Busty Milf; comic character.
- Melissa Majlat as Colleague #3; workplace colleague.
- Gail Humphreys as Old Lady; elderly passer-by.
- Harry McGee as Colleague #4; workplace colleague.
- William Tisdall as Colleague #5; workplace colleague.
- Cail Humphries as Ferry Worker; ferry employee.
- Bev Killick as Payroll Lady; payroll employee.
- Zoltan Goli as Executive #2; corporate employee.
- Ronald Evans as Executive #1; corporate employee.
- Kate Gorrie as Hiker #1; hiker.
- Julien Raspail as Hiker #2; hiker.
- Felicia Haryanto as Nurse; medical worker.
- Stephen Kelly as Dump Worker #2; dump worker.
- David Moon as Smoking Pedestrian; passer-by.
- Jade Bohni as Breast Feeding Mother; passer-by.
- Warwick Sadler as Council Worker; council employee.
- Christine Ong as Paramedic #1; emergency worker.
- Grace Moss as Paramedic #2; emergency worker.
- Richard Anastasios as Stunt Double; stunt performer.
- Jacqueline Dyson as Nurse #2; medical worker.
- Ella Bourne as Crazy Ferry Passenger; eccentric passenger.
- Jason Hura as Scientist 3; scientist.
- Oliver Owen as Supermarket Attendant; supermarket employee.
- George Iskander as Husband #5; minor character.
- Robert Fragnito as Husband #4; minor character.
- James Cerche as Other Podcast Guy; podcaster.
- Carlo Greco as Security Guard; security guard.
- Blair Venn as American Statesman; politician.
- James Polidano as Butcher; butcher.
- Tony Ung as Teenage Cashier; cashier.
- George George as Cigar Shop Attendant; shop employee.
- Leon Deutsch as Train Station Commuter; commuter.
- Nick Farnell as Jeffrey.

== Episodes ==
No.	Title	Directed by	Written by	Original release date
1	"Burger Kings"	Theodore Saidden	Theodore Saidden & Nathan Saidden	October 30, 2025
2	"Daddy Issues"	Theodore Saidden	Theodore Saidden & Nathan Saidden	October 30, 2025
3	"Welcome to Hell"	Theodore Saidden	Theodore Saidden & Nathan Saidden	October 30, 2025
4	"Billionaire Island"	Theodore Saidden	Theodore Saidden & Nathan Saidden	October 30, 2025
5	"Red Pill"	Theodore Saidden	Theodore Saidden & Nathan Saidden	October 30, 2025
6	"Supermen"	Theodore Saidden	Theodore Saidden & Nathan Saidden	October 30, 2025

== Production ==
Netflix announced the series on May 30, 2024, as part of its slate of original Australian programming. The series was produced by Princess Pictures and received development and production investment from VicScreen and Screen Tasmania. Filming took place primarily in Melbourne.

== Reception ==
Upon release, the series reached the number one position on Netflix's Top 10 TV Shows list in Australia. ScreenHub praised the "Hollywood-level" cinematography and the shift toward a more structured narrative compared to the creators' previous sketch-based content.

Cultural analysis from The Conversation explored the show's place in the history of "wog humour" in Australia, noting that the Saiddens transitioned from the stereotypical "wog boy" tropes to more extreme, surrealist characterizations that avoid simplistic stereotypes.

Metro highlighted that despite some "brutal" critical reviews calling the humor "rubbish" or "vulgar," the series saw a massive viewership surge. Decider suggested that while the "bodily function humor" might not appeal to everyone, the series remains highly addictive for those familiar with the creators' YouTube roots.
