= Bad Behaviour (2010 film) =

- Australian theatrical release poster
- Directed by: Joseph Sims
- Written by: Joseph Sims
- Produced by: Steven Caldwell; Craig A. Kocinski; Kristijana Maric
- Starring: John Jarratt; Lindsay Farris; Jean Kittson; Roger Ward
- Cinematography: Justin Cerato
- Edited by: Steven Caldwell
- Music by: Luke McDonald
- Distributed by: Monster Films (Australia)
- Release dates: 28 August 2010; (Melbourne Underground Film Festival)
- Running time: 90 minutes
- Country: Australia
- Language: English

Bad Behaviour is a 2010 Australian crime thriller film, written and directed and by Joseph Sims and starring John Jarratt, Lindsay Farris and Dwaine Stevenson and features in supporting roles Robert Coleby, Georgina Symes, Roger Ward, Jean Kittson and Ellen Grimshaw.

== Plot ==
The film chronicles the intersecting storylines of a variety of characters using a Nonlinear narrative. Emma and Peterson are two sociopathic siblings who drift into the sleepy coastal town of Cecil Bay, on the run from the brutal gangster, Voyte Parker (Roger Ward). Over the course of the film, Senior Constable Richard 'Ricky' Bartlett (John Jarratt) is driven violently insane, his partner, Constable Mark Brown (Dwaine Stevenson) is confronted and consumed with his wife's infidelity. Final year high school students, Chaar, Matt, Candice, Danny and Sam just want to party.

== Cast ==
- John Jarratt as Ricky
- Lindsay Farris as Peterson
- Caroline Levien as Emma
- Dwaine Stevenson as Mark
- Robert Coleby as Clive
- Georgina Symes as Jennifer
- Roger Ward as Voyte
- Jean Kittson as Jane
- Ellen Grimshaw as Chaar

== Awards ==
Award	Category	Subject	Result
Melbourne Underground Film Festival	Best Film	Steven Caldwell	Won
Melbourne Underground Film Festival	Best Film	Kristijana Maric	Won
Melbourne Underground Film Festival	Best Film	Craig A. Kocinski	Won
Melbourne Underground Film Festival	Best Film	Joseph Sims	Won
Melbourne Underground Film Festival	Best Director	Joseph Sims	Won
Melbourne Underground Film Festival	Best Screenplay	Joseph Sims	Won
Melbourne Underground Film Festival	Best Actor	Lindsay Farris	Won
Melbourne Underground Film Festival	Best Supporting Actor	Roger Ward	Won
Melbourne Underground Film Festival	Best Supporting Actress	Ellen Grimshaw	Won
