= Sebastian Thaler =

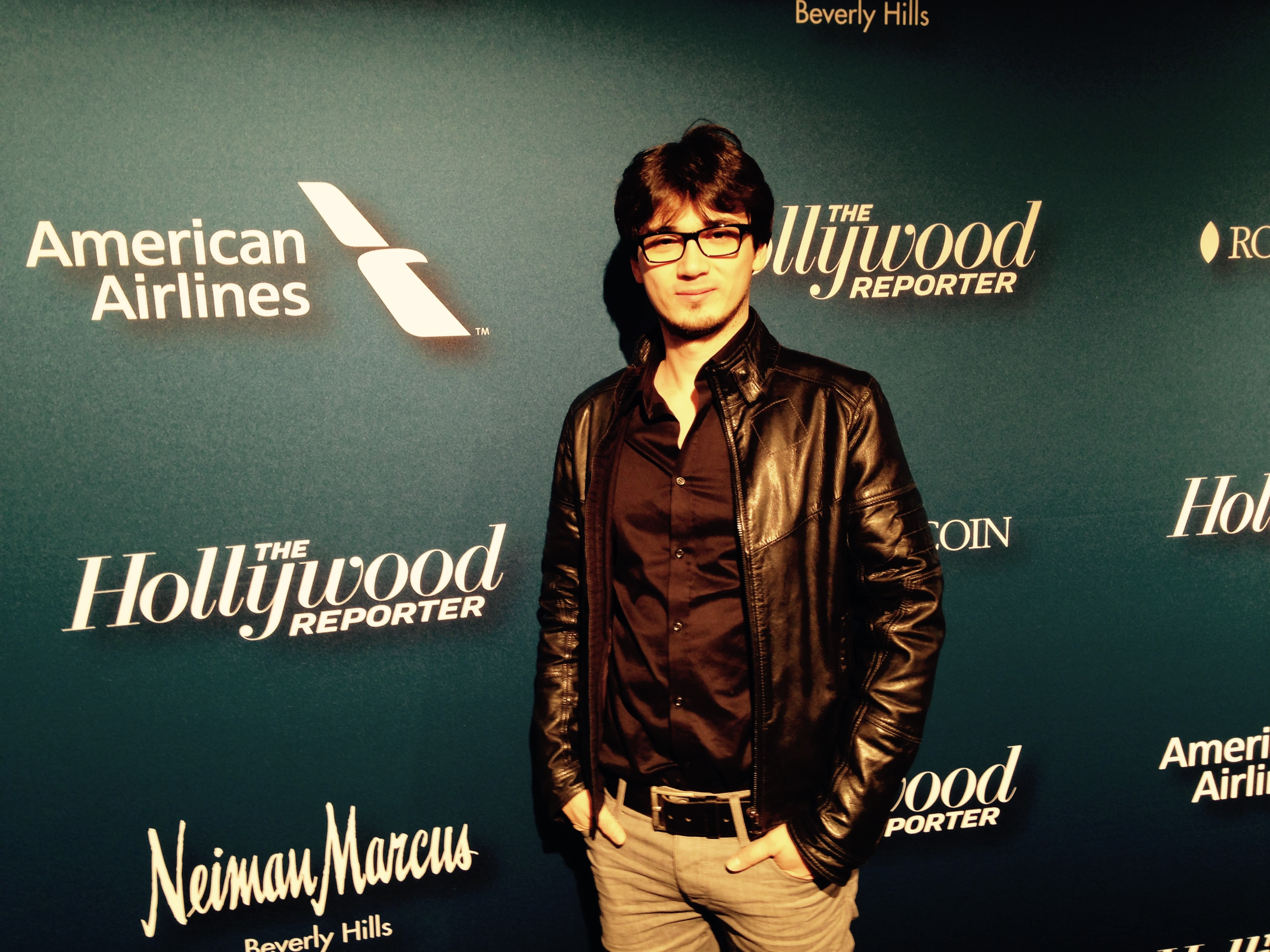
Thaler pictured in 2016

Sebastian Thaler (born 27 September 1986 in Vienna) is a Cinematographer.

== Life and career ==
Thaler finished his master's degree in cinematography at the Film Academy of Vienna under the guidance of Walter Kindler and Michael Haneke in 2016. He learned from and worked with Ed Lachman as a camera assistant on several projects.

He was also working as a camera operator and/or 1st AC on documentaries and feature films with his father, Wolfgang Thaler, when he is shooting as DoP. With him he worked on films like „Import/Export“ or the „Paradise Trilogy“ by Ulrich Seidl as well as films by Michael Glawogger („Workingman's Death“).

== Awards ==
First Steps Award Germany

- 2015: Nominee: Michael-Ballhaus-Preis für Kameraabsolventen (Michael Ballhaus Award for Cinematography graduates)

== Filmography as a Cinematographer ==
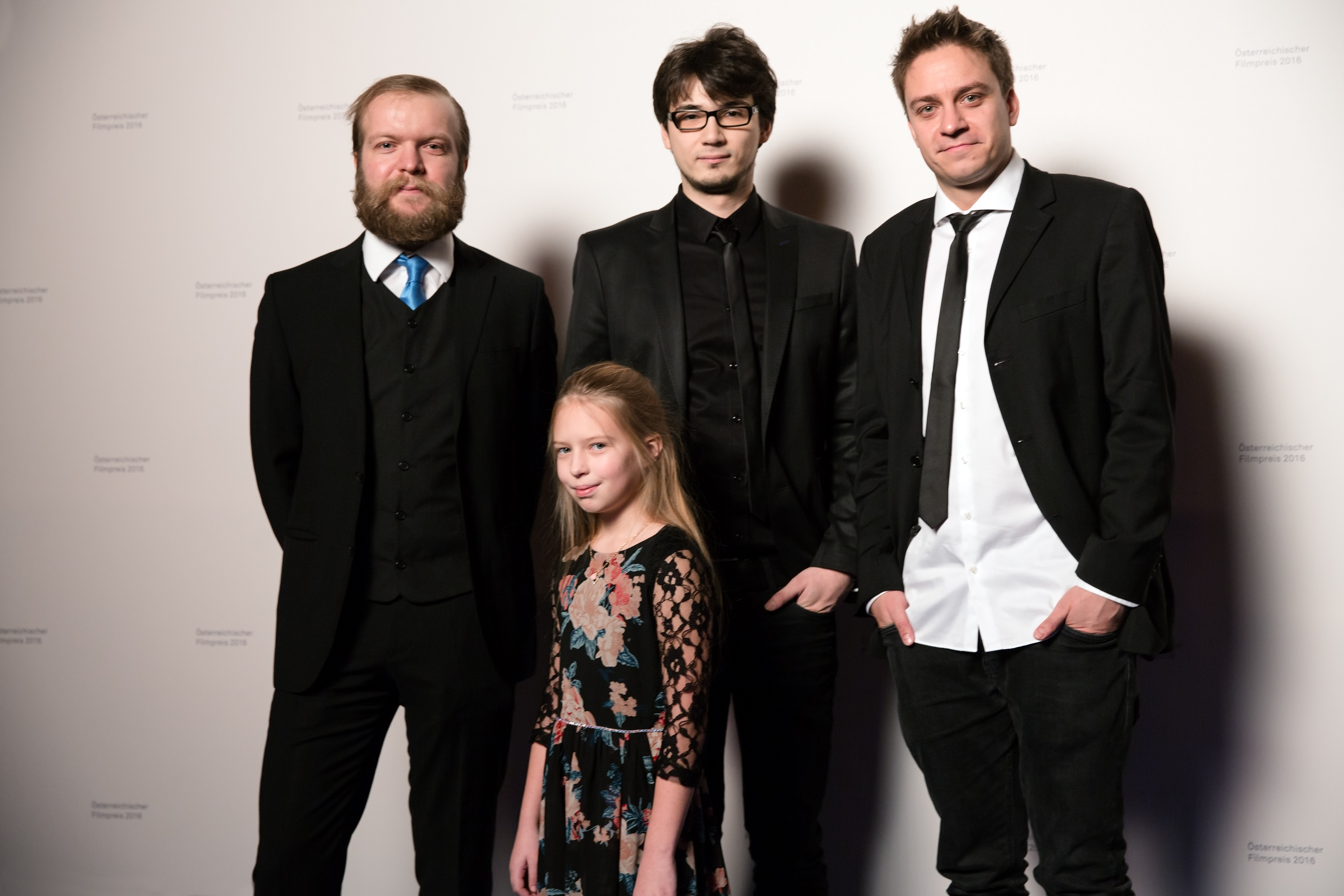
At the Austrian Film Awards

- 2015: Everything will be okay ( Dir.: Patrick Vollrath) Short
- 2015: Man's Work ( Dir.: Marina Stepanska) Short
- 2015: Forrest of Echos ( Dir.: Luz Olivares Capelle) Short
- 2014: Hinter der Tür (Dir.: Patrick Vollrath) Short
- 2013: Ketchup Kid (Dir.: Patrick Vollrath) Short
