= 7500 (film) =

2019 action-thriller film

- Promotional poster
- Directed by: Patrick Vollrath
- Written by: Patrick Vollrath; Senad Halilbašić
- Produced by: Maximilian Leo; Jonas Katzenstein
- Starring: Joseph Gordon-Levitt; Omid Memar; Aylin Tezel; Carlo Kitzlinger; Murathan Muslu; Paul Wollin
- Cinematography: Sebastian Thaler
- Edited by: Hansjörg Weißbrich
- Production companies: MMC Studios; Augenschein Filmproduktion; FilmNation Entertainment; Endeavor Content
- Distributed by: Universum Film (Germany/Austria); Amazon Studios (United States)
- Release dates: 9 August 2019 (Locarno); 26 December 2019 (Germany); 18 June 2020 (United States)
- Running time: 92 minutes
- Countries: Austria; Germany; United States
- Languages: English; German; Turkish
- Budget: $5 million

7500 is a 2019 action-thriller film directed by Patrick Vollrath (in his feature-length directorial debut) and written by Vollrath and Senad Halilbašić. It stars Joseph Gordon-Levitt as Tobias Ellis, a pilot whose plane is hijacked by Islamic terrorists. An international co-production between Austria, Germany, and the United States, filming took place in November 2017 in Cologne and Vienna. The title is in reference to Emergency Transponder Code for "unlawful interference".

The film's world premiere occurred at the Locarno Film Festival on 9 August 2019 and was digitally released in the United States on 18 June 2020, by Amazon Studios to mixed reviews from critics, with praise for Gordon-Levitt's performance.

== Plot ==
European Airways pilots Captain Michael Lutzmann and First Officer Tobias Ellis are preparing for a flight aboard an A319 from Berlin to Paris. Tobias talks to one of the flight attendants, who happens to be his girlfriend, Gökce. Lutzmann re-enters the cockpit and they begin their pre-flight checks.

Once airborne, one of the flight attendants, Nathalie, begins bringing the pilots their in-flight meals, giving terrorists an opportunity to attempt a hijacking by forcing their way into the cockpit. Killing Nathalie in the process, two terrorists, Kinan and Vedat successfully enter the cockpit and attack the pilots. Tobias fights Vedat off and manages to close the door, leaving Kinan in the cockpit. Lutzmann is stabbed and mortally wounded by Kinan as he broadcasts a mayday call. Tobias manages to subdue Kinan by slamming him in the head with a fire extinguisher, surviving the attack, but his left arm is badly wounded in the process. Tobias signals air traffic control using the radio transponder code 7500 (the emergency transponder squawk for a hijacking). The flight is diverted to Hanover, which is the closest place to land safely. Tobias restrains Kinan and straps him in the jump seat.

The remaining hijackers continuously attempt to break into the cockpit while Tobias alerts air traffic control of the events that have transpired. Tobias is reminded by control that he is not permitted to open the cockpit door despite threats by the hijackers to harm or even kill hostages. Lutzmann eventually succumbs to his wounds and Tobias unsuccessfully tries to revive him. Inside the cockpit, Tobias watches a camera feed monitor of the entrance to the cockpit, which reveals that a passenger has been taken hostage by Daniel, one of the hijackers. Daniel begins threatening to kill the hostage unless Tobias opens the door. Tobias pleads with Vedat on the interphone, telling him that the cockpit door cannot be opened, but Daniel executes the passenger anyway.

Daniel returns with another hostage; this time, it is Gökce. Tobias pleads with them to spare her life, and even attempts to summon the passengers to her rescue by informing them that the hijackers are poorly armed with only glass knives and no firearms. He pleads with Vedat to intervene but to no avail; Gökce is killed as he watches helplessly.

Tobias resumes piloting the plane. Unbeknownst to him, Kinan manages to escape from his restraints and knocks Tobias unconscious. He opens the door to allow Vedat inside the cockpit, who has escaped the passengers attacking the remaining hijackers in the cabin. Vedat manages to close the door and he ties up Tobias as Kinan takes control of the plane. It becomes clear that he intends to crash the plane, but Vedat suffers a crisis of conscience. Fearing death, he kills Kinan and frees Tobias, who retakes control of the plane.

Tobias continues preparations to land at Hanover, but Vedat demands they fly somewhere else. He eventually relents after Tobias explains the plane is low on fuel and has to land, and helps the injured Tobias land the plane in Hanover. After they land, the passengers and remaining crew evacuate while a police hostage negotiator begins communicating to the cockpit via radio. Vedat demands fuel during negotiations, becoming emotionally unstable as he is faced with the outcome of his actions. The hijacker is briefly calmed and distracted when his mother calls him on his cellphone, and he cries to her that he just wants to go home. After the call, he becomes aggravated, as Tobias pleads with the young man to surrender. Eventually, Vedat grows more aggressive and threatens to kill Tobias, but he is shot by a German police sniper and is incapacitated.

The police enter the cockpit as Tobias tries to save Vedat, and he pleads for the police to summon a doctor for Vedat. As Tobias and Vedat are escorted from the plane, Tobias' gaze drifts to Gökce's body, still lying outside the cockpit. In the silence of the evacuated plane, the film ends as Vedat's cellphone begins ringing again in the now empty cockpit.

== Cast ==
- Joseph Gordon-Levitt as First Officer Tobias Ellis
- Omid Memar as Vedat
- Aylin Tezel as Gökce
- Carlo Kitzlinger as Captain Michael Lutzmann
- Murathan Muslu as Kinan
- Paul Wollin as Daniel
- Aurélie Thépaut as Nathalie

== Production ==
In January 2017, it was announced that Paul Dano would star in 7500, a film to be directed by Patrick Vollrath, marking his feature-length directorial debut. Filming was slated to commence in mid-2017 in Germany. However, when filming was delayed, Dano dropped out of the project due to scheduling conflicts, and was replaced by Joseph Gordon-Levitt. Principal production then commenced in November 2017, in Cologne and Vienna. Speaking of Gordon-Levitt's participation in the project, Vollrath said: "Joseph is one of the most exciting actors on the screen today, and we can't wait to work with him and see what magic he brings to this complex role".

== Release ==
In May 2019, Amazon Studios acquired distribution rights to the film, and distributed it under their Amazon Prime Video banner. It had its world premiere at the Locarno Film Festival on 9 August 2019. It was digitally released in the United States on 18 June 2020.

== Reception ==
On review aggregator Rotten Tomatoes, the film holds an approval rating of 71% based on 154 reviews, with an average rating of 6.5/10. The website's critical consensus reads: "7500 never achieves maximum altitude as a skybound thriller, but Joseph Gordon-Levitt's solid central performance manages to hold it reasonably aloft." On Metacritic, the film has a weighted average score of 58 out of 100, based on 23 critics, indicating "mixed or average" reviews.

Giovanni Melogli of Cineuropa wrote: "The claustrophobic setting is an extremely effective element to achieve the goal set by the director: that is, to outline human behavior and reactions in extreme situations, where rationality and emotion mix and are fought with unpredictable results." Allan Hunter of Screen Daily described the film as striving for "authenticity" rather than "the heroics and histrionics of an American blockbuster" and likened the limited set to "the ingenuity of Hitchcock" for its ability to instill "a good deal of sweaty-palmed anxiety generated by the story, use of close-ups and the sense of confinement." Likewise, Guy Lodge of Variety called 7500's opening as "briskly effective in a cold-sweat sort of way, carrying its audience from a smooth takeoff to the first signs of disturbance to swiftly cranked all-out terror with the kind of nervy efficiency you can admire without exactly taking pleasure in it."
