= Superwog =

Australian comedy duo

- Genre: Comedy
- Created by: Theodore Saidden; Nathan Saidden
- Written by: Theodore Saidden; Nathan Saidden
- Directed by: Theodore Saidden
- Country of origin: Australia
- Original language: English
- No. of seasons: 2
- No. of episodes: 12

Production
- Executive producers: Emma Fitzsimons; Elia Eliades
- Producer: Paul Walton
- Production locations: Sydney, Australia (YouTube videos); Melbourne, Australia (series)
- Running time: 21–24 minutes
- Production companies: Princess Pictures, Film Victoria, Screen Australia

Original release
- Network: ABC Comedy; ABC iview; Netflix
- Release: 9 October 2018 – 13 June 2021

Related
- Superwog miniseries Son of a Donkey

superwog1
- Born: Theodore Saidden; 24 February 1988 (age 38); Nathan Saidden; 30 April 1989 (age 37); Sydney, Australia

YouTube information
- Channel: @superwog
- Years active: 2008–present
- Genre: Comedy
- Subscribers: 3.5 million
- Views: 524 million
- Last updated: 18 May 2025

Superwog1 or just simply Superwog, is a comedy duo consisting of two Australian brothers, Theo (Superwog) and Nathan Saidden. Their YouTube channel consists of various videos including comedies and skits. They have gained over 3 million subscribers and 545 million video views. They have produced a television comedy series based on their YouTube sketch comedies. The series follows Theo, aka "Superwog", his family, and his friend Johnny, getting into all kinds of trouble throughout the Australian suburbia.

Produced by Princess Pictures with production support from Film Victoria, the original series was developed in association with Screen Australia and YouTube through the "Skip Ahead" initiative. The six part series was the first Australian long-form series to be released on YouTube, followed by ABC linear channel, and at its conclusion had reached 14 million people across YouTube alone, with another 1 million plus reached across ABC Comedy.

The series premiered on 9 October 2018, following a successful pilot aired in 2017. On 11 November 2020, a second season was announced, and all 6 episodes finally aired on 13 June 2021 on ABC iview.

On 24 August 2022, both long form seasons of the series were released worldwide on Netflix. However, due to the term wog being considered an ethnic slur to people from the Mediterranean and Middle Eastern regions, Superwog is displayed as Superbro on versions of Netflix outside of Australia. On 2 September of that same year, a short sketch titled Meeting with Netflix was uploaded to the official Superwog YouTube channel, as a way to promote the series' arrival to the streaming site.

On 31 January 2025, Netflix uploaded a video to YouTube teasing a new series featuring the characters of Superwog, titled Son of a Donkey. It premiered on Netflix on 30 October 2025.

== Background ==
The Superwog series is based on characters from the YouTube channel of the same name, created by brothers Theo and Nathan Saidden. The brothers were born in Sydney to a Greek-Egyptian mother and Egyptian father. Growing up, they attended the Trinity Grammar School in the Inner West suburbs of Sydney.

The series depicts humorous situations involving the titular character, an archetypal wog. The two cited Sacha Baron Cohen, Chris Lilley and Fat Pizza as influences for the series, and drew inspiration from their childhoods, noting they would "re-enact scenes of [their] mum and dad fighting" and "derive a lot of observational comedy from their arguments". The Saidden brothers began filming and uploading Superwog videos to their YouTube channel in 2008, while Theo was studying law at university.

The YouTube series gained notable popularity, and has been adapted into stage shows. The series launched for Adult Swim in 2013, and in 2017, formed part of The Slot sketch comedy series. In 2019, the Saidden brothers began performing Superwog as a live show in Australia and New Zealand.

== Production ==
The Superwog pilot was produced by Paul Walton at Princess Pictures and supported by Screen Australia and Google, funded through Skip Ahead. It was written and created by Theodore and Nathan Saidden. Uploaded to YouTube on 16 July 2017, it quickly rose to #1 on the trending page on Australian YouTube in 2017, with over 14 million views.

The pilot follows Superwog (Theodore Saidden) and his friend Johnny (Nathan Saidden), who work at a fast-food store.

== Cast ==
=== Main ===
- Theo Saidden as:
  - Theo, a teenager who goes by the titular moniker 'Superwog'. He spends much of his time aggravating his Dad or hatching schemes with his best friend Johnny.
  - Mum, Theo's highly-traditional and prideful mother. While often protective of Theo, she can prove to be just as problematic as his father.
- Nathan Saidden as:
  - Johnny, Theo's best friend, and an idiot savant. While often the voice of reason, Johnny often proves to be just as idiotic as Theo himself.
  - Dad, Theo's father who often goes through bouts of extreme anger, taking it out on his wife and son, as well as anyone else who he may believe has done him wrong.
- Sasha Sutton as Max, the foil to Theo and Johnny's antics, oftentimes serving as an obstacle to be overcame, portraying roles such as a fast food manager, a police chief, a detective, and a zombie apocalypse survivor.
- Thomas Little as Steve, a returning antagonist featured in seasons 1 & 2. He portrays a childhood nemesis of Theo's, who later lures him and Johnny into a cryptocurrency scam, while also returning later as an illegitimate trainee doctor, who severs Theo's toe during surgery and steals it.

=== Guests ===
- Akmal Saleh as School Janitor
- Alicia Banit as Holly
- Andrew Blackman as Foster Dad
- Brett Swain as Council Worker #1
- Carla Bonner as Foster Mum
- Deidre Rubenstein as Agnes
- Ellen Grimshaw as Formal Babe #1
- John Orcsik
- Louise Crawford as Soft Nurse
- Lucia Smyrk as Lisa
- Marta Kaczmarek as Mother in Law
- Nell Feeney as Concierge
- Renai Caruso as DOCS Worker
- Roger Oakley as Barrister
- Marty Rhone as Judge
- Tony Rickards as Lawyer

== Episodes ==
=== Season 1 ===
No.	Title	Directed by	Written by	Original release date	Viewers (millions)
0	"Pilot"	Theodore Saidden	Theodore & Nathan Saidden	16 July 2017	
Theo gets embarrassed by his dad yet again as the neighbours spotted him trying to solve constipation issues in their back yard, and decides to run away with his mate Johnny and get a job at a fast food restaurant. The manager interviews them, and lets them work after discovering their incredible memorisation of the restaurant menu's prices. Joel, a blonde worker gets on their bad side, but they fix it by holding his head under an ice-cream dispenser. The manager sides with the two as Joel wasn't the best worker, while recognising and relating with their need of guidance. Theo's Mum and Dad go to a counselling session, and after causing many distractions, are instructed to put themselves in each others shoes, causing them to mockingly imitate one other. When the councillor shows the final results to Mum about Dad being highly violent and abusive, Mum calls her out for being sad, lonely, and in denial. Theo gets home and gives a drugged burger to Dad, solving his constipation.
1	"Breaking Dad"	Theodore Saidden	Theodore & Nathan Saidden	9 October 2018	n/a
In primary school, Theo hated swimming, as his excessive pubic hair was visible outside of his swimming undies. In the present, Dad bashes though his door to get him to school, after Theo refused to go as it was swimming day. Theo fakes disassociation, and a concerned teacher involves CPS after learning of Theo's dad's abusive tendencies. The teacher takes Theo to a traditional Australian foster family, where he is welcomed. Mum and Dad end up at a mandatory psychiatric evaluation, and Dad reveals he often puts Theo's head through gyprock, stating that he doesn't like his son that much, insulting his intelligence. Theo gets along with his foster family at first, but his mannerisms start causing trouble, such as playing Put It in Your Mouth over the radio, or making sexually provocative comments towards his foster mother. He ends up taking his foster dad's car for a joyride with his foster brother, and upon returning, is threatened by his foster dad, but is stopped by foster mother. As a result, Theo is sent home to his family, and his foster brother stands at his front door, wishing him farewell.
2	"The Family Jewels"	Theodore Saidden	Theodore & Nathan Saidden	16 October 2018	0.141
Whilst renovating their bathroom, Theo and Dad fight over a sledgehammer, both wanting to knock the bathroom wall. Dad wins, not allowing Theo to use it and declares that he always wins. His subsequent smashing of the wall reveals a hidden letter from a soldier, presumably a former owner of the house, regarding the location of buried treasure located within a nearby mountain range, intended to help finance his family following his death. Dad attempts to distract Theo by offering him the sledgehammer to smash the wall, but having lost all interest, the two race to the car. Dad succeeds and escapes with Mum, causing Theo to launch a brick into the back window, and a race to the treasure ensues. Theo enlists Johnny's help, and together they purchase a shovel, steal the car, and embark towards the mountain range, leaving Johnny's bike behind at the hardware store in the process. After a pit stop at a cafe for directions, Johnny gets food poisoning from the food they ate, causing them to wreck their car. The two relieve themselves in portapotties, but a work truck takes Johnny away. Dad, who has stolen Johnny's bike at the hardware store, starts having issues with it and hitchhikes in the RV of a touring American family. However, after turning violent and hijacking the RV, he is attacked by the family and thrown out. Enraged, a numbed Dad takes on a gang of bikers and steals one of their motorcycles. Simultaneously, Theo dresses as a woman to hitchhike in a tractor unit truck, but the fooled driver tries to coerce him into sex, and Theo knocks out the driver and steals the truck. Both Theo and Dad arrive at the location, and Dad gets the briefcase first. They fight over it, and Dad almost falls over a cliff, but Theo catches his hand. Not wanting to split the treasure 80/20 in Theo's favour, Dad throws the briefcase down the mountainside, declaring himself the ultimate winner in the end. Later that night at home, the two learn while watching the news that the touring American family Dad had hitchhiked with found the briefcase that had been discarded down the mountain, and that the dad will split it with his son 50/50. Enraged, Dad chases Theo out of the house, feeling cheated out of the riches. Meanwhile in South Australia, Johnny steps out of his portapotty, covered in his own feces from the shaky truck trip.
3	"The Final Exam"	Theodore Saidden	Theodore & Nathan Saidden	23 October 2018	0.111
Theo wakes up in the morning to the sound of the mailman putting his school test results in the mail. Dad gets to it first, and after discovering Theo's absurdly low grades, collapses. After being rushed to the hospital, Mum is told by the doctor that Dad has suffered a minor heart attack and must avoid stress no matter the cost. After discovering Theo is the source of Dad's stress, Mum bargains with Theo to buy him a used car so long as he passes his final exam. Theo enlists Johnny's help in acquiring the answer sheet to the exam by blackmailing their teacher with an inappropriate photo purchased from the janitor. After finding the document in the staff room, they photocopy it at the library and rush back before the teachers arrive. Theo is forced to hide within one of the lockers as the teachers arrive back, and Johnny disguises himself as a substitute teacher in order to allow Theo to slip out unnoticed. However, Johnny is caught in his ruse and suspended from school. Theo was able to cheat on his final using an earpiece and microphone attached to his shirt, allowing him to get the answers from Johnny. Meanwhile, a Japanese therapist is enlisted to aid Dad in managing his anger. After being prescribed Valium, he is sent home, having achieved a peaceful mind. However, his anger returns when he discovers Theo cheated on his final exam.
4	"The Formal"	Theodore Saidden	Theodore & Nathan Saidden	30 October 2018	0.095
Theo and Johnny speak with their school formal dates over the phone, who convince them to wear gorilla and Captain Planet costumes to a supposed pre-formal party. However, they soon discover it was a cruel joke played upon them by their nemesis, Jackson. After getting home, Theo is approached by Dad, who convinces him that his grandmother has a special formula which will make him sexually attractive to other women, and that he himself used this formula to attract 523 women, as well as a donkey. Mum overhears this, and outraged, she storms off. Theo and Johnny retrieve the formula from Theo's grandmother and attempt to attract women at the gym, but soon discover the tonic attracts women much older than expected. Meanwhile, Mum refuses to have sex with Dad, refusing to be objectified any longer. Dad spends the day in agony, at one point even attempting to purchase surgical scissors to castrate himself. However, he learns to earn his wife's affection by doing her household chores. Meanwhile, Johnny and Theo bring two prostitutes named Julia and Tammy to their formal, and are called out publicly by Jackson. However, Julia and Tammy embarrass Jackson by recounting a previous encounter with him in which he asked them to play with his feet. Later that night, after being kicked out of the formal for bringing Julia and Tammy, Theo and Johnny bond with them over their shared love for donuts, while Dad clears up the matter with Mum by revealing that the claim about attracting 523 women was false, and he made it up to make Theo feel confident, although the claim about attracting a donkey was true.
5	"The Power Trip"	Theodore Saidden	Theodore & Nathan Saidden	6 November 2018	n/a
It's Dad's birthday, and Mum is baking him a cake. Meanwhile, Theo and Johnny are monitoring two computers mining Bitcoin. Johnny doubles their efficiency and in extension, their power consumption. Theo dismisses the notion of Dad finding out, citing the fact that he likely doesn't know what day it is. Dad checks the electricity bill amount, which totals to $5,434.56. Dad is outraged and storms into Theo's room, demanding to know why the bill is so high. He finds out Theo is mining Bitcoin using several computers and insults his intelligence, citing him to be the idiot of the family, and Bitcoin to be worthless, calling it a scam. He unplugs the computers, but is stopped by Theo before he can do any further damage. Theo then brings the computers over to Johnny's house, asking what to do with them. Johnny calls in a favour with a friend from pre-school(who earned Johnny's trust by assisting him in finger-painting) and the two bring the computers to his work building. At the post office, Dad states that there is a mistake on his electricity bill, but the lady working behind the counter confirms there is not, saying the only issue is the fact that it is two weeks overdue. Dad grows angry and shouts that only a fool would pay such a high bill, incorrectly stating it to be over $10,000. He then storms out, stating that God will give him electricity. Meanwhile, Theo and Johnny meet up with Steve, and they put their computers in a vacant room, across the hall from Steve's office, and he assures the two that he'll keep an eye on the machines as they mine Bitcoin. Later, while they're having milkshakes, Theo and Johnny discover the Bitcoin-mining computers have vastly increased in efficiency due to the good air-conditioning of Steve's workplace. After learning of the sudden dramatic increase in the value of Bitcoin on the news, Theo and Johnny discover their current 200 Bitcoins are now worth over $500,000. At home, Dad installs a solar panel to supply the house with electricity, refusing to pay the electricity bill, incorrectly stating its amount once again, citing it to be $15,000. Dad declares himself to be a genius, before rain clouds form and cover the sun, rendering the solar panel useless. Theo and Johnny spend their newly-earned wealth, buying expensive coats, chains, watches, eating at fancy restaurants, and arranging for the purchase of two Ferraris. The two then take Steve to get burgers, assuring him that they'll "take care of him", as thanks for watching over the computers. However, Steve reveals his 3-month contract with the company has ended, and as such doesn't work there anymore, nor does he have access to the computers. Enraged, Theo throws a burger at Steve, who promptly runs away. At home, Dad is forced to manually generate electricity by pedalling an exercise-bike as Mum bakes a cake, while watching TV and blow-drying her hair. At the company building, Theo and Johnny sneak in disguised as general contractors, and go to retrieve the computers, only to find them missing. They question some Asian employees, who state that all of the computers in the building belong to them. Enraged, Theo threatens to bash them, and the men promptly return the computers. On the way home, Theo and Johnny discover the computers they've been carrying were gutted for their hardware, and have been filled with trash. Nearby, the employees drive Ferraris down the road as they yell "Bitcoin boys for life"(Which is what Johnny and Theo called each other). At home, Dad has solved the electricity problem, and Theo returns to find him and Mum eating cake on the couch, watching TV. Dad learns on the news that Bitcoin has value after all, and insults Theo for being lazy, instead of doing something productive like mining Bitcoin. Enraged, Theo chases Dad with a knife, until the power cuts out. It turns out Dad had temporarily solved their electricity issues by plugging into the neighbor's outlet; who has now shut it off, discovering his scheme.
6	"The Zombie Apocalypse"	Theodore Saidden	Theodore & Nathan Saidden	13 November 2018	0.088
Theo and Johnny are speaking over the phone, and Johnny mentions a nearby abandoned rail yard, saying the ghosts of famous celebrities haunt it. Wanting to make contact with 2Pac and Colonel Sanders, the two make their way there. They avoid a Ranger checking up on a homeless man, and take an alternative route into the abandoned building. After going inside, Theo calls out for 2Pac, but the duo turns to hear a loud creaking sound, and are knocked unconscious. The two wake up dazed, and agree to leave. Upon making it back outside, Johnny and Theo decide to ask the homeless man for directions. He turns around and reveals his decomposed face, and Theo and Johnny turn to leave, before being chased. Following a fast chase, the homeless man is gunned down, and the duo are ushered into a cabin by the Ranger. Theo and Johnny question him, and they discover they've been unconscious for six months, and in the time since then, a zombie apocalypse has begun and wiped out most of Australia. Back at Theo's house, it's revealed that Dad and Mum are alive, and have turned their home into a shelter, also housing their neighbor Holly, and another unnamed survivor. Dad goes on a rant about conspiracy theories regarding bottled water, and the government giving people cancer, after having consumed five year's worth of canned corn in six months. Meanwhile, the Ranger, Theo, and Johnny hide behind a train as they devise a plan to get to a nearby truck without attracting attention from the zombies. However, Theo and Johnny fight over the passenger seat, forcing the Ranger to use his last two bullets on a charging duo of zombies. Back at home, the unnamed survivor breaks down and laments over how he took food for granted, and how his large amount of body fat was basically "lamb fat". Dad looks at the unnamed survivor and drools at the thought of cannibalising him, but is stopped by Mum. In the truck, the Ranger is headed for the supermarket to find some water, but is tormented by Theo and Johnny as they say he has gonorrhea and accused of being a pedophile. Meanwhile, the large unnamed survivor is confronted by Dad, who offers him a hot bath. The survivor accepts the offer, but soon escapes after Dad bites into his arm and realises he is attempting to cook him. Dad chases the survivor but is knocked out by Holly. Back in the truck, the Ranger is having issues understanding a map, when a female zombie approaches the window, seducing Theo into rolling it down. Theo reaches out and inadvertently tears off one of the zombie's breasts, leading to him and Johnny fighting over it. The Ranger grabs it and throws it out the window, and drives off. They pick up another survivor, but he is quick to take offense at Theo calling the creatures "zombies" and that they prefer to be referred to as "the living deceased". After going on a spiel, the survivor is promptly thrown out of the truck and killed by a zombie. Back home, Dad has been restrained and convinces Mum to release him after saying he loves her. The Ranger, Theo, and Johnny make it to the supermarket, but the pair of friends get distracted conversing about the ethics of buying glass bottled water and comparing zombies to pitbulls; in that they won't attack if you avoid eye contact. Johnny volunteers to prove this correct, but is tackled by a zombie and killed. Back at home, Dad promises not to attempt to eat the unnamed survivor, but is distracted from this when he realises a zombie is using his outside toilet and smoking his cigarettes. Enraged, he storms outside and beats the zombie to death with a baseball bat, while Mum is chased by another zombie and killed. Cornered, the unnamed survivor screams as he is slowly approached by a hungry Dad. The Ranger and Theo make it to the house, but discover that Dad has eaten all of the canned corn, as well as the unnamed survivor. The Ranger goes out to send out a broadcast for help, but returns with the revelation that there is nobody else alive, leaving the Ranger, Theo, Dad, and Holly the last remaining humans on Earth. They soon realise that they are responsible for repopulating the human race, and Dad promptly proclaims himself to be the ultimate savior of humankind, and that he will "plant his seed" in Holly and as such, he shall bear the future children of the world. The Ranger reveals his inability to procreate due to having gonorrhea after all, and being impotent. Dad is shot by Holly, but it isn't until he is shot three more times that he succumbs. Theo initially exclaims, but then approaches Holly, seeing it as a contest he won, but is promptly shot as well. Theo wakes up in the abandoned rail yard building once again with Johnny by his side, and are led out by the Ranger. Confused, the duo question what is going on, and the Ranger reveals they were knocked unconscious by a gas leak, and that their zombie apocalypse experience was a collective dream. The homeless man nearby is alive and well, but is revealed to have teabagged Theo and Johnny in their sleep. Disturbed, Theo returns home and sits in the kitchen as Dad prepares a bowl of canned corn. Theo reveals the details of the dream he had, and Dad dismisses it, saying everything is okay. However, he turns around to reveal a missing patch of skull in the back of his head, exposing his brain, much to Theo's horror.

=== Season 2 ===
No.	Title	Directed by	Written by	Original release date
1	"The P Plates"	Theodore Saidden	Theodore & Nathan Saidden	13 June 2021
Superwog’s Dad attempts to stop his neighbour from parking outside his house, whilst his son borrows his car for a driver's test, which forces his Dad to find other ways to block his neighbour from parking in the spot.
2	"The Lawsuit"	Theodore Saidden	Theodore & Nathan Saidden	13 June 2021
Superwog's Dad files a lawsuit against his local supermarket after they accuse him of theft, while Superwog bumps into an old friend from primary school.
3	"The Magpie"	Theodore Saidden	Theodore & Nathan Saidden	13 June 2021
Superwog and Johnny have a dilemma with a territorial magpie, while Superwog's Dad rushes to stock up on cheap petrol following a record low drop in the price of it.
4	"Something Fishy"	Theodore Saidden	Theodore & Nathan Saidden	13 June 2021
Theo and Johnny notice Johnny's elderly Swedish neighbour Agnes struggling with her groceries, but Johnny rudely walks away. Theo helps Agnes instead, and she gives him a tin of Swedish biscuits as thanks, which she asks Theo to make sure to give to Johnny. Theo also learns that Enrico, Agnes's husband, passed away a month ago. Johnny gets angry at Theo for accepting the biscuits, which means that he will now owe Agnes the tin back. Johnny then rants about how when he did help Agnes, he became her unofficial caretaker and had to take her bins out once in a while, as well as calling Enrico an asshole for staring at him too much. Johnny then orders Theo to throw the biscuits out and give the tin back. Meanwhile, Mum and Dad are at the home of Mum's parents, who clearly don't approve of Dad. Dad and Mum's Father have just gotten back from fishing, in which they only caught one small tuna. Dad wants to cook it and eat it, but Mum's Father instead puts it in the freezer to have another day. Angered, Dad declares he will find a tuna and eat it in front of Mum's Father. Meanwhile, Theo tries to return the empty tin to Agnes, but she refuses, calling it rubbish. After Theo gives Agnes the same compliment Enrico used to, she sentimentally reveals he became mute and then gives his favourite dish to Theo. But when Theo and Johnny open the pot, they are repulsed by the rotten fish smell of the dish. Meanwhile, Dad wins a giant 40kg tuna at auction and runs away with it, despite the wholesaler's protests about the hot 30-degree weather outside. Theo and Johnny learn that the dish is surströmming, a popular celebratory Swedish dish. Theo is disgusted that anyone would eat such a dish and goes to give the pot back, but Agnes's caretaker spots him and praises him for making Agnes happy again. Agnes comes out with another pot of surströmming and horrifies Theo when she claims in Swedish that Theo is Enrico reincarnated. Theo and Johnny decide to feed the surströmming to the seagulls. Meanwhile, after Mum's Father refuses to let Mum pick him up, Dad tries to take the bus, but the driver refuses to let him bring the tuna on board. Theo and Johnny then spot a crowd gathered around a flock of dead seagulls and an ibis, who have strangely died from eating the surströmming. Theo makes up a lie about the "Great Seagull Death Migration of the Southern Hemisphere", but he admits the ibis might have been poisoned. Not wanting the prison time for killing the seagulls, Theo decides to pin the crime on Agnes. Johnny orders Theo to turn himself in when the police arrive at Agnes's house, but she angrily spits at Theo as she's being taken away, confusing him. Meanwhile, Dad hides with his tuna in a bottle shop, but the employee kicks him out. Dad then attempts to enter a milk bar, but the owner refuses him entry and throws the tuna in front of a bus, smashing it into pieces. Dad then runs over and eats the remains of the tuna. At the police station, Theo confesses he killed the birds to clear Agnes's name, but the sergeant reveals that Agnes had murdered Enrico by poisoning him with expired food, and that he had been staring at Johnny as a plea for help. She had also laced the biscuits she gave Theo with cyanide to kill Johnny as well for not taking her bins out anymore. The sergeant finally reveals that the salt in the surstromming is what killed the birds, who all had high blood pressure to begin with. Meanwhile, Dad returns to Mum's Father and vomits on everyone as a result of eating the raw tuna.
5	"The Lump"	Theodore Saidden	Theodore & Nathan Saidden	13 June 2021
Theo questions Johnny about a strange protrusion on his body, whom the latter labels as a bump, saying a bump is good and a lump is bad. After researching on the internet, a frantic Theo demands Johnny to take him to the hospital. The secretary dismisses Theo's worries about the "lump" at first, but immediately calls for a doctor upon learning Theo had used Google, citing it as a credible source. Meanwhile, Dad visits his parents in-law with Mum, who are fawning over his father in-law's new table tennis table. He and Dad compete, and the former wins, citing himself as the winner, a tic shared by Dad. Enraged, Dad later turns around the car to return for another match. After wagering 500 dollars, the father-in-law accepts. At the hospital, Theo is assured by a doctor that his "lump" is actually a "bump" and that he had nothing to worry about. However, the doctor reveals he has a speech impediment and proceeds to mix up "lump" and "bump", confusing Theo. He sits down to get his blood drawn, but is spooked when he notices Steve, who has apparently become a doctor. He panics and crashes into a shelf, knocking himself unconscious. Meanwhile, Dad wins the bet, securing himself as the winner of the table tennis match. However, the father-in-law ups the ante, and puts his brand new tennis table on the line. Dad accepts, and subsequently wins the match, earning the table for himself. At the hospital, Theo wakes up to learn that his "lump" was a rare cyst that just required quick surgery to remove. Believing Steve to be a hallucination, Theo stands up in victory, but exclaims when he discovers his left toe has been amputated. Nearby, the doctors question Steve's credentials as they discover he listed a fake country in his resumé. Steve drives off, carrying two jars containing Theo's toe and cyst, while smiling devilishly. Meanwhile, Dad humiliates his father-in-law by returning the table to him through hard rubbish.
6	"21 Jump Ya"	Theodore Saidden	Theodore & Nathan Saidden	13 June 2021
Theo approaches Johnny and tells him about a pair of fake shoes he sold to a local on eBay, but Johnny expresses worry as Theo didn't specify on the listing that they were fake shoes. Later, Theo discovers that the customer he sold the shoes left him a bad review, and that not only was his buyer feedback in the negative range, but the customer had received a full refund. Angered, Theo confronts the customer and assaults him with the very pair of shoes he sold him, leading to him and Johnny being arrested. The police chief proposes a deal to the two; confront the suspected ringleader of the fake shoe market and record evidence of a purchase, and they go free. Theo initially refuses, citing the fact that he isn't a snitch. However, the police chief intimidates the two with their potential cellmate, a large man named Bob. Later, the police chief introduces the two to Head of Operations; Detective Max, and Theo points out that Max is the drive-thru manager. Theo and Johnny insult Max's detective work as well as his name of choice for the operation; "Operation Ping-Ming". Later on, Theo and Johnny meet up with Ming, the ringleader of the fake shoes market, but they find out that Ming is a pleasant person, buying them both food as well as tipping a waitress 50 dollars, while citing his charitable intentions. In the bathroom, Theo refuses to bust Ming, citing him as "Asian Robin Hood". Johnny becomes angry and expresses his desire to be a free man again, so the two continue with the operation. When they return, they both learn that Ming's shoe market is run to fund a charity, as well as for the purpose of paying off a foreign warlord named Big Wang, who has Ming's wife and son serving as slaves. Theo and Johnny return to the police station, and point out to Max that Big Wang should be who they're after, and not Ming. Max responds that Big Wang's case is out of their jurisdiction and brings in Bob as well as other three prisoners, and Johnny points out that Max is exploiting the men as blackmail by mislabelling them as rapists. Emboldened, Theo tells Max to "shove Operation Ping-Ming up his arse" but backtracks and agrees to go through with a final purchase with Ming after Max aims his pistol at him. At Ping-Ming's home, they learn that it is also used to shelter the homeless. After proposing a purchase of 5,000 fake shoes, Ming is touched and reveals that the order will free his wife and son from slavery. However, Theo exposes the sting operation and reveals to Ming that he and Johnny are working for the police after Ming wishes the two to be his son's godfathers. The three men are thrown in prison, and are confronted by Bob and the three other promised cellmates. They applaud Ming for his charity, Johnny for his thoughtfulness, and Theo for being "a real piece of shit". The prisoners chip in their cigarette money to hire the best lawyer in the country, who successfully frees Theo, Johnny, and Ming, under the guise that the fake shoes were to support the installation of an art exhibit, commenting on the role of brands in a consumer-oriented society. Max is promptly fired from both police work and the drive-thru, and after attempting to lunge at Theo, is dragged out by security as Ming, Theo, and Johnny exit the courthouse in victory.

== See also ==
- List of Australian television series
- Wog
