= CJ Bloomfield =

New Zealand actor (born 1991)

- Born: Christopher Harvard Jr. Bloomfield; 19 July 1991 (age 35); Auckland, New Zealand
- Occupation: Actor
- Years active: 2021–present
- Known for: Furiosa: A Mad Max Saga; Mortal Kombat II

Christopher Harvard Jr. Bloomfield (born 19 July 1991) is a Polynesian-New Zealand actor. Bloomfield is known for his performance in Furiosa: A Mad Max Saga and The Secrets She Keeps. He also appeared in the film Mortal Kombat II (2026) and the upcoming film R.U.R.

== Early life ==
Bloomfield was born in Auckland, to Polynesian parents, when he was young, he played junior rugby league for the Gold Coast Titans Under 20s team.

=== Life of crime and incarceration ===
Prior to acting, Bloomfield was a member of the Hells Angels Outlaw motorcycle club.

In March 2014, Bloomfield was arrested by Queensland Police's Taskforce Maxima. Bloomfield was alleged, with another member of the Hells Angels, to have committed extortion and assault in relation to an individual's $16,000 drug debt. In 2016, Bloomfield was charged with breaching his bail conditions. In 2018, Bloomfield was sentenced to four years and three months in jail after pleading guilty to extortion, assault, stealing, unlawful use of a motor vehicle and making threats to kill.

Bloomfield was released on parole in 2019.

== Career ==
In 2017, Bloomfield was conditionally accepted in Bond University.

Bloomfield said that during his time in solitary confinement he began to picture what a "healed version of myself looked and felt like, and what it looked and felt like to be a Hollywood actor."

In 2021, Bloomfield appeared in his first feature film Australian sports drama Streamline.

In 2023, Bloomfield was cast in Mortal Kombat II (2026). He also signed with Industry Entertainment Talent agency.

In 2024, Bloomfield had a supporting role in Furiosa: A Mad Max Saga.

== Filmography ==
=== Film ===
Year	Title	Role	Notes
2021	Streamline	Dwayne	
2023	Too Many Ethnics	Bouncer	Short film
2023	Halfway		Short film (also Executive Producer)
2024	Furiosa: A Mad Max Saga	Big Jilly	
2025	Ice Road: Vengeance	Yug	
2026	Mortal Kombat II	Baraka	
TBA	R.U.R.	Primus	
TBA	Subversion		

=== Television ===
Year	Title	Role	Notes
2022	The Secrets She Keeps	Brent Scicluna	Season 2, 3 episodes
2024	Critical Incident	Christian	Season 1, 4 episodes
2025	NCIS: Sydney	Bobby the Bouncer	Season 2
