= Streamline (film) =

2021 Australian drama film

- Official release poster
- Directed by: Tyson Wade Johnston
- Written by: Tyson Wade Johnston
- Starring: Levi Miller; Jason Isaacs
- Production companies: Bronte Pictures; Jay Douglas; Rebellion Studios
- Distributed by: Umbrella Entertainment
- Release dates: 19 August 2021 (MIFF); 2 September 2021 (Australia)
- Running time: 86 minutes
- Country: Australia
- Language: English

Streamline is a 2021 Australian sports drama film written and directed by Tyson Wade Johnston. It marks his directorial debut. It was released on 19 August 2021 at the Melbourne International Film Festival, and in Australian cinemas on 2 September 2021, by Umbrella Entertainment.

== Synopsis ==
Teenage swimmer Benjamin Lane faces problems after his father leaves jail.

== Cast ==
- Levi Miller as Benjamin Lane
- Jason Isaacs as Rob Bush
- Robert Morgan as Coach Clarke
- Laura Gordon as Kim Lane
- Jake Ryan as Dave Bush
- Hunter Page-Lochard as Josh Hill
- Steve Bastoni as Glenn Goodman
- Tasia Zalar as Patti Hill
- Sam Parsonson as Nick Bush
- CJ Bloomfield as Dwayne

== Production ==
Streamline was the directorial debut feature from Tyson Wade Johnston.directorial debut. The film was sold at the American Film Market by Arclight Films.

To build the character, Levi Miller consulted with Olympic swimming champion Ian Thorpe, who is credited as executive producer for the film. The title refers to the swimming term "streamline".

Production was by Bronte Pictures, Jay Douglas, and Rebellion Studios.

== Release ==
The film was released on 19 August 2021 at the Melbourne International Film Festival, and in Australian cinemas on 2 September 2021, by Umbrella Entertainment.

== Reception ==
On the review aggregator website Rotten Tomatoes, 75% of 20 critics' reviews are positive.

Luke Buckmaster at The Guardian called the film "an emotionally gripping swimming film that breaks the sports movie mould". Paul Byrnes at Sydney Morning Herald wrote "the film grows muscles as it progresses, a bit like a swimmer in training, but it's too little too late."

In his review for The Curb, Andrew F. Peirce wrote: "Streamline is an impressive and towering achievement from Tyson Wade Johnston, one that will be earmarked as a turning point in Levi Miller's enduring career, a possible pivot point that will likely guide him towards more mature performances".
