= R.U.R. (film) =

Upcoming film by Alex Proyas

R.U.R
- Directed by: Alex Proyas
- Screenplay by: Alex Proyas
- Based on: R.U.R. by Karel Čapek
- Produced by: Alex Proyas; Morris Ruskin; Adam Krentzman; Steven Matusko; Brett Thornquest
- Starring: Sammy Allsop; Lindsay Farris; Anthony LaPaglia; Richard Roxburgh; Nicholas Brown; Brenden Lovett; CJ Bloomfield; Brian Lipson; Lauren Grimson
- Cinematography: Aleksei Vanamois
- Music by: Michael Lira
- Production companies: Mystery Clock Cinema; MoJo Global Arts
- Countries: Australia; United States
- Language: English

R.U.R. (Rossum's Universal Robots) is an upcoming science fiction musical film written and directed by Alex Proyas and based on the 1920 Czech play of the same name by Karel Čapek. The film stars Sammy Allsop, Lindsay Farris, Anthony LaPaglia, and Richard Roxburgh.

== Premise ==
The film follows a young woman, Helena, who arrives at the island factory of Rossum's Universal Robots. Helena plots to give the robots souls and emancipate them from capitalist exploitation, a decision that quickly leads to unintended destruction.

== Cast ==
- Sammy Allsop as Helena Glory
- Lindsay Farris as Harry Doman
- Anthony LaPaglia
- Richard Roxburgh
- Goran D. Kleut as The Rossom Twins
- Nicholas Brown as Doctor Gall
- Brenden Lovett as General Alquist
- CJ Bloomfield as Primus
- Brian Lipson as Dr Hallemeier
- Lauren Grimson as Amelia

== Production ==
=== Development ===
Alex Proyas announced that he had written a film adaptation of Karel Čapek's 1920 Czech play R.U.R. in August 2023. Proyas would also direct and produce alongside Morris Ruskin. The musical science fiction film was described as "Dr. Strangelove and Brazil meets Young Frankenstein and The Greatest Showman."

Speaking about the process of adapting the original play, Proyas said he wrote it with an intent of placing focus on current technological advancements. Proyas said "it talks about what’s happening today in terms of AI, but through the lens of this wonderful, classic tale, so a lot had to change.”

In 2023, Lindsay Farris was cast as the general manager of Rossum's Universal Robots, Harry Domin.

In October 2023, Proyas announced a kickstarter for the film. Proyas said it would allow him to "have the creative freedom required to create original films free from studio interference".

In August 2024, Mallory Jansen and Anthony LaPaglia were added to the cast. In October, Proyas announced the casting of Richard Roxburgh, Nicholas Brown, Brenden Lovett, CJ Bloomfield, Brian Lipson, Lauren Grimson and Sammy Allsop.

Proyas documented the development of the film on a monetized Patreon blog.

=== Filming ===
The film began principal photography on 28 October 2024. The shoot extensively deployed on-set virtual production.
