= Spirits of the Air, Gremlins of the Clouds =

- Japanese promotional poster
- Directed by: Alex Proyas
- Written by: Alex Proyas
- Produced by: Alex Proyas; Andrew McPhail
- Starring: Michael Lake; Rhys Davis; Norman Boyd
- Cinematography: David Knaus
- Edited by: Craig Wood
- Music by: Peter Miller
- Production company: Meaningful Eye Contact
- Distributed by: MMA Films; Pro-Image
- Release date: 29 June 1989
- Running time: 93 minutes
- Country: Australia
- Language: English
- Budget: A$500,000

Spirits of the Air, Gremlins of the Clouds is a 1989 Australian independent science fiction adventure film directed, produced and written by Alex Proyas, who was making his first feature debut. Set in a post-apocalyptic world in which two siblings live in a homestead whose silence gets interrupted by a fugitive named Smith. Starring Michael Lake, Rhys Davis and Norman Boyd, the film was shot on location near Broken Hill, New South Wales and at Supreme Studios Sydney and was made with a budget of A$500,000.

Upon release, the film received mixed reviews. It is unknown how much the film grossed at the box office yet it commenced Proyas' status in filmmaking.

== Premise ==
Siblings Felix and Betty Crabtree live alone in a homestead on a treeless desert plain. Their solitary lives are interrupted by a fugitive with a mysterious past, who gives the name "Smith". Smith is fleeing to the north, a trio of sinister figures in pursuit. Felix, who is a wheelchair user, tells Smith that the route to the north is blocked by an impassable wall of cliffs, and convinces him that the only way he can travel beyond them is to fly. Smith, at first skeptical, is eventually convinced that his only means of escape lies with Felix's plan to build a "flying machine". Meanwhile, the religiously addled Betty is convinced that Smith is a demon from hell, and makes her own plans to get rid of him.

== Cast ==
- Michael Lake as Felix Crabtree
- Rhys Davis (Melissa Davis) as Betty Crabtree
- Norman Boyd (The Norm) as Smith

== Reception ==
Film critic David Stratton praised the film as having a "special vision," with brilliant production design, but while furthermore opined that "the film frustrates because of its lethargy and stiltedness".

Rolling Stone magazine called the soundtrack recording "an album of stunning instrumental beauty and exquisite soundscapes" and awarded it 4 stars.

== Re-release ==
In June 2018, director Alex Proyas released a trailer on his YouTube channel for a re-release of the movie, remastered from original 16mm negative and featuring a restored soundtrack from the original Dolby Stereo mixes. The movie was re-released internationally in September 2018 on Blu-ray and DVD by Umbrella Entertainment. Composer Peter Miller's original soundtrack was also re-released as a 30th anniversary edition.

== Accolades ==
Award	Category	Recipient	Result
AACTA Awards (1988 AFI Awards)	Best Production Design	Sean Callinan	Nominated
AACTA Awards (1988 AFI Awards)	Best Costume Design	Angela Tonks	Nominated
AACTA Awards (1988 AFI Awards)	Best Costume Design	Mathu Anderson	Nominated
ARIA Music Award	Best Original Soundtrack, Cast or Show Album	Peter Miller	Nominated
Yubari International Fantastic Film Festival	Special Prize	Alex Proyas	Won
