= Wild Kat =

- Starring: Pia Prendiville; Daniel Daperis; Marta Kaczmarek
- Country of origin: Australia
- Original language: English
- No. of seasons: 1
- No. of episodes: 13

Production
- Production company: Barron Entertainment

Original release
- Network: Network Ten
- Release: 2 June – 19 August 2001

Wild Kat is an Australian children's television series that first screened on Network Ten in 2001.

== Plot ==
Wild Kat tells the story of 15-year-old Katrina and her 11-year-old brother Jamie, who are sent to live with their mother at Perth Zoo. Kat discovers that she can "mind meld" with Garang, a ferocious female tiger that prowls the Big Cat Enclosure at the City Zoo. The tiger is able to project her own moods and emotions onto Wild Kat, triggering extraordinary powers and abilities for the teenager.

== Cast ==
- Pia Prendiville as Katrina Ryan
- Daniel Daperis as Jamie Ryan
- Marta Kaczmarek as Dr. Lydia Raushark
- Paris Abbott as Jasmin Ainsworth
- Nicolette Findlay as Kristen Ainsworth
- Luke Pegler as Alex
- Karin Hampton as Erica Moore
- Ewen Leslie as Morgan Ritchie

== See also ==
- List of Australian television series
