= Gabriela Marcinková =

Slovak actress (born 1988)

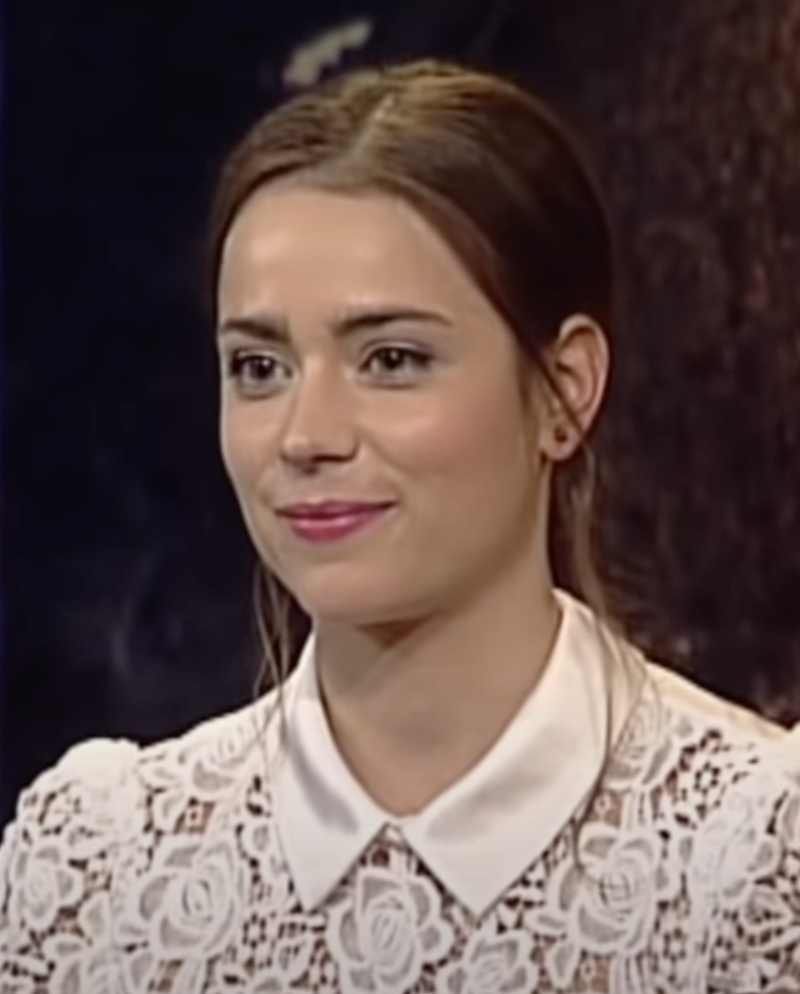
- Gabriela Marcinková in 2013
- Born: 2 April 1988 (age 38); Prešov, Czechoslovakia
- Education: Academy of Performing Arts in Bratislava
- Occupation: Actress
- Spouse: Martin Michalčín (m. 2015; div. 2025)
- Children: 2

Gabriela Mihalčínová Marcinková (born 2 April 1988) is a Slovak theatre, film and television actress.

Gabriela Marcinková was born on 2 April 1988 in Prešov. She studied acting at the Academy of Performing Arts in Bratislava. Following graduation, she starred in several plays at the Arena Theatre, Slovak National Theatre and the Andrej Bagar Theatre. In 2020 she was the face of the "Year of the Theatre" campaign in Slovakia.

On the big screen, Marcinková starred in Fernando Meirelles movie 360 (2013) and Austrian comedy horror film Attack of the Lederhosen Zombies (2016).

Marcinková starred in several TV Series, including Doktor Martin (2015) and Vědma(2023).

Marcinková was nominated as for the OTO Award in the Best New Actress category. In 2023, she competed and finished as the runner up in the Let's Dance show.

== Personal life ==
In 2015 Marcinková married the singer Martin Michalčín. They have two children. In January 2025, Marcinková announced she and Michalčín mutually agreed on a divorce.
