= Subversion (film) =

American action film

- Directed by: Patrick Vollrath
- Written by: Andrew Ferguson
- Produced by: Lorenzo di Bonaventura
- Starring: Chris Hemsworth; Lily James; Michael Peña; Simone Kessell; Robert John Burke; David Wenham; Joe Cole; Teresa Palmer
- Cinematography: Stephen F. Windon
- Edited by: Jonathan Amos
- Production company: Di Bonaventura Pictures
- Distributed by: Amazon MGM Studios
- Country: United States
- Language: English

Subversion is an upcoming American action thriller film directed by Patrick Vollrath and written by Andrew Ferguson. It stars Chris Hemsworth, Lily James, Michael Peña, Simone Kessell, Robert John Burke, David Wenham, Joe Cole, and Teresa Palmer.

== Cast ==
- Chris Hemsworth
- Lily James
- Michael Peña
- Simone Kessell
- Robert John Burke
- David Wenham
- Joe Cole
- Teresa Palmer
- Damon Herriman
- Donné Ngabo
- Jimmy Gonzales
- Alex Meraz
- CJ Bloomfield
- Awdo Awdo
- Saffron Deacon

== Production ==
The film is from Amazon MGM Studios, with Patrick Vollrath directing from a script by Andrew Ferguson, with Di Bonaventura Pictures producing. The cast is led by Chris Hemsworth as a blackmailed naval commander. In July 2025, Lily James joined the cast. In September, Michael Peña, Simone Kessell, Robert John Burke, David Wenham, Joe Cole, Teresa Palmer and more additions joined the cast.

=== Filming ===
Principal photography began on September 15, 2025, at Village Roadshow Studios in Gold Coast, Queensland.
