= Bloom (TV series) =

Australian television series

- Genre: Drama; Action; Crime; Adventure; Science fiction
- Created by: Glen Dolman
- Directed by: John Curran; Mat King
- Starring: Bryan Brown; Jacki Weaver; Phoebe Tonkin; Ryan Corr
- Country of origin: Australia
- Original language: English
- No. of seasons: 2
- No. of episodes: 12

Production
- Producer: Sue Seeary
- Cinematography: Geoff Hall
- Production company: Playmaker Media

Original release
- Network: Stan
- Release: 1 January 2019 – 9 April 2020

Bloom is an Australian science fiction drama television series which was released on Stan. A six-part mystery was released on 1 January 2019, and stars Bryan Brown, Jacki Weaver, Phoebe Tonkin, and Ryan Corr. A second season was released on 9 April 2020.

== Premise ==
A year after a devastating country flood kills five people, a new plant is discovered with the power to restore youth. This is a miracle for locals but some are prepared to kill for it.

== Cast ==
- Bryan Brown as Ray Reed, Gwen's husband and care taker.
- Jacki Weaver as Gwendolyn 'Gwen' Reed. Gwen is a retired actor who moved back to her childhood town with her husband, Ray.
- Phoebe Tonkin as Young Gwen
- Ryan Corr as Young Tommy / Sam (season 1)
- Daniel Henshall as Dave 'Griffo' Griffiths (season 1)
- John Stanton as Max McKinnon
- Sam Reid as Young Max (season 1)
- Thomas Fisher as Isaac Langlan (season 1)
- Genevieve Morris as Rhonda Stokes
- Anne Charleston as Loris Webb
- Terry Norris as Herb Webb
- Jacob Collins-Levy as Young Herb (season 1)
- Usha Cornish as Farida Korrapati
- Amali Golden as Young Farida (season 1)
- Maria Mercedes as Margot (season 1)
- Nikki Shiels as Tina Griffiths (season 1)
- Tessa Rose as Vivian North (season 1)
- Rod Mullinar as Tommy Brydon
- Thomas Ersatz as Shane Rawlins
- Keith Brockett as Detective Zhen (season 1)
- James Cerche as Detective Wilkins (season 1)
- Peter Carroll as Frank Warlie (season 1)
- Angus McLaren as Young Frank (season 1)
- Ruth Katerelos as Annie
- Jan Di Pietro as CIB Officer
- Jackson Heywood as Young Ray (season 2)
- Scott Lee as Skeeter (season 2)
- Jacqueline McKenzie as Anne Carter (season 2)
- Gary Sweet as Old Donnie (season 2)
- Bella Heathcote as Young Loris (season 2)
- Ed Oxenbould as Luke (season 2)
- Ellen Grimshaw as Sarah (season 2)
- Tom Budge as Shane
- Toby Schmitz as John (6 episodes)
- Andrew Blackman as Martin (3 episodes)
- Peter Carroll as Old Frankie Warlie (1 episode)
- Oliver Ackland as Young Donnie (1 episode)

== Episodes ==
Series	Episodes	Originally released
1	6	1 January 2019
2	6	9 April 2020

=== Season 1 (2019) ===
No. overall	No. in season	Title	Directed by	Written by	Original release date
1	1	"The Memory Box"	John Curran	Glen Dolman	1 January 2019
2	2	"Back to Life"	John Curran	Glen Dolman	1 January 2019
3	3	"Redemption"	John Curran	Glen Dolman	1 January 2019
4	4	"Little Miracle"	Mat King	Alison Nisselle	1 January 2019
5	5	"The Kick Inside"	Mat King	Matt Cameron	1 January 2019
6	6	"Super Sam"	Mat King	Glen Dolman	1 January 2019

=== Season 2 (2020) ===
No. overall	No. in season	Title	Directed by	Written by	Original release date
7	1	"Blip"	Greg McLean	Glen Dolman	9 April 2020
8	2	"Fruit of the Earth"	Greg McLean	Giula Sandler	9 April 2020
9	3	"Hand of God"	Greg McLean	Catherine Smyth-McMullen & Glen Dolman	9 April 2020
10	4	"Truer Love"	Sian Davies	Tommy Murphy & Glen Dolman	9 April 2020
11	5	"The Evermore"	Sian Davies	Matt Ford	9 April 2020
12	6	"The Cult Of Gwendolyn Reed"	Sian Davies	Glen Dolman	9 April 2020

== Production ==
Bloom is produced by Playmaker in partnership with Sony Pictures Television and distributed internationally by Sony.
