= Marta Kaczmarek =

Polish-born Australian actress

- Born: 24 April 1955 (age 71); Krasnystaw, Poland
- Citizenship: Poland, Australia
- Occupations: Actress, director
- Years active: 1976-present
- Spouse: Kristof (Krzysztof) Kaczmarek
- Children: Kasia Kaczmarek

Marta Kaczmarek is a Polish-Australian theatre, television and film actress.

== Early life ==
Kaczmarek was born in Krasnystaw, Poland, and trained at the Ludwik Solski Academy for the Dramatic Arts in Krakow. She moved to Perth, Western Australia, with her husband Kristof (Krzysztof) and daughter Kasia in the 1980s, where she worked as a dancer, waitress, real estate agent, actor, director and lecturer at the Western Australian Academy of Performing Arts. Along with her husband, they formed Theatre Zart.

== Career ==
After a career in theatre, Kaczmarek's first Australian film role was opposite Geoffrey Rush in Shine.

Kaczmarek has had guest roles in numerous Australian television series as well as recurring roles in Wild Kat, Offspring, Rake and Wentworth.

Her book of poems, Ziemia Przybrana (Adopted Earth), was published in 2004.

Following her daughter, actress Kasia Kaczmarek, Marta moved to Melbourne in 2007, directing community projects in Glenroy and Albion and a production for the 2010 Melbourne International Comedy Festival.

Between 2007 and 2010, she played the lead role of Ellie Zdybicka in the SBS drama The Circuit alongside Gary Sweet and Aaron Pedersen.

== Personal life ==
Kaczmarek is married to actor / director Kristof (Krzysztof) Kaczmarek and their daughter is actress Kasia Kaczmarek.

In 2004, Kaczmarek was awarded a Cavalier's Cross of the Order of Merit of the Republic of Poland by the Polish government for her longstanding efforts in the cultivation of Polish culture in Australia.

== Awards and nominations ==
| Year | Nominated work | Award | Category | Result |
|---|---|---|---|---|
| 2004 | Marta Kaczmarek | Cavalier's Cross of the Order of Merit of the Republic of Poland | Longstanding efforts in the cultivation of Polish culture in Australia | Honoured |
| 2011 | Arnold Zable's Cafe Scheherazade | Green Room Award | Best Female Performer | Won |
| 2015 | Rake | Equity Ensemble Award | | Won |

== Filmography ==
=== Television ===
| Year | Title | Role | Notes |
|---|---|---|---|
| 1996 | Sweat | Marta | 1 episode |
| 1997 | Blue Heelers | Ivana | 1 episode |
| 2001 | Wild Kat | Dr Lydia Raushark | 13 episodes |
| 2007-10 | The Circuit | Ellie Zdybicka | 12 episodes |
| 2008 | Underbelly | Odinea Mladenich | 1 episode |
| 2009 | Rush | Helen | 1 episode |
| 2010 | Tangle | Psychic | 1 episode |
| 2010 | Offspring | Sonja | 7 episodes |
| 2013 | The Doctor Blake Mysteries | Klara Krol | 1 episode |
| 2013 | Mr & Mrs Murder | Malina Cheresniak | 1 episode |
| 2014–2018 | Rake | Maria Vargas | 12 episodes |
| 2017 | Newton’s Law | Zora | 1 episode |
| 2017 | Trip for Biscuits | Nana | 1 episode |
| 2017 | Glitch | Registrar | 1 episode |
| 2014-2017 | Wentworth | Marge Nowak | 7 episodes |
| 2018 | How to Stay Married | Tina | 1 episode |
| 2019 | Playing for Keeps | Ferderikia | 2 episodes |
| 2020 | Harrow | Ruth Kovacs | Season 3, episode 2 |
| 2021 | Jack Irish | Anja | Season 3: "Hell Bent", 2 episodes |
| 2021 | Superwog | Mother in Law | 2 episodes |
| 2023 | North Shore | Dima | 2 episodes |
| 2024 | Human Error | Deaconess Naomi | 1 episode |
| 2025 | Apple Cider Vinegar | Magda | 1 episode |
| 2025 | Son of a Donkey | Mother in Law | 3 episodes |

=== Film ===
| Year | Title | Role | Notes |
|---|---|---|---|
| 1996 | Shine | Rachel | Feature film |
| 1998 | Justice | Mrs. Rubinski | |
| 2010 | The Wedding Party | Russian Woman | Feature film |
| 2012 | Last Dance | Mrs. Ruben | Feature film |
| 2013 | The Last Time I Saw Richard | Nurse | Short film |
| 2017 | Beast | Sophie | Short film |
| 2024 | Windcatcher | Lou | |
| 2024 | Ricky Stanicky | Mimi Jacobs | Feature film |

== Theatre ==
| Year | Title | Role | Notes |
|---|---|---|---|
| | War and Peace | Natasha | Stage debut |
| | Idiot | Aglaya | |
| | Twelfth Night | Viola | |
| 1993 | Night Story | | Artsite for Perth Festival |
| 1993 | Waiting for Godot | | Hole in the Wall Theatre, Perth with Black Swan State Theatre Company |
| 1998 | Milk and Honey | | Playhouse, Perth with Perth Theatre Company |
| 2010 | Serenade | Director | The Dog Theatre, Melbourne for Melbourne International Comedy Festival |
| 2011 | Cafe Scheherazade | Masha | Fortyfivedownstairs, Melbourne |
| 2014 | Thérèse Raquin | Madame Raquin | Theatre Works, Melbourne |
| 2016 | The Honey Bees | Joan | Red Stitch Actors Theatre, Melbourne |
| 2016 | Uncle Vanya | Marina the Nurse | Red Stitch Actors Theatre, Melbourne |
| 2018 | Sami in Paradise | Gita | Belvoir Street Theatre, Sydney |
| 2019 | Escaped Alone | Lena | Red Stitch Actors Theatre, Melbourne |
| 2023 | Crocodiles | Helen | Northcote Town Hall with Darebin Arts Speakeasy |
