= Gary Farrelly =

Irish artist (born 1983)

- Born: 1983 (age 42–43); Dublin
- Education: NCAD LUCA School of Arts

Gary Farrelly (born 1983) is a contemporary Irish artist based in Brussels.

== Career ==
Farrelly graduated from the National College of Art and Design in Dublin in 2006. His work involves a recurring fixation with narcissistic, utopic, and infrastructural themes.

He was the subject of and star of the 2018 film work GLUE, a "50-minute portrait of the director Oisín Byrne's friend and longtime collaborator, a quick-witted and acid-tongued cross-dresser who refuses to adhere to a fixed identity." Additionally, Farrelly, with Chris Dreier, is part of the artistic collaboration: "Office for Joint Administrative Intelligence".
