= Bondi Short Film Festival =

Film festival in Sydney

- Genre: Competitive short film festival
- Date: 27 November
- Frequency: Annually
- Locations: Bondi Beach, New South Wales, Australia
- Years active: 25
- Inaugurated: 2001
- Participants: 200
- Website: http://www.bondishortfilmfestival.com/

The Bondi Short Film Festival is an annual one-day competitive short film festival open to amateur filmmakers held in the Australian city of Sydney, at Bondi Beach. The Festival's founding and current artistic director is Francis Coady.

== History ==
Established by Coady in 2001, the Festival began by giving young filmmakers a festival to screen their films, reportedly as a favour to Coady's friends who had missed out on entering films in other Sydney film festivals. The first festival screening was held at the North Bondi RSL Club. Due to its success, by 2002 it has moved to its current home at the Bondi Pavilion.

The Festival accepts entries in any genre, with the only restrictions being it must be Australian, under 15 minutes in length, and made in the previous 18 months. Prizes are currently awarded in four categories: Best Film, Best Cinematography, Best Actor and Best Music. Whilst the competition is predominantly an amateur’s festival, films are judged by leading industry professionals. Over the years, festival judges have included Margaret Pomeranz, Sam Worthington, Bruce Beresford, Rachel Ward, Damon Gameau, David Caeser and Gracie Otto.
