= Attack of the Lederhosen Zombies =

- Film poster
- Directed by: Dominik Hartl
- Written by: Armin Prediger; Dominik Hartl
- Produced by: Markus Fischer
- Starring: Laurie Calvert; Gabriela Marcinková; Oscar Dyekjær Giese
- Cinematography: Xiaosu Han; Andreas Thalhammer
- Edited by: Daniel Prochaska
- Music by: Paul Gallister
- Production company: Fischer Film
- Release date: April 4, 2016 (BIFFF)
- Running time: 78 minutes
- Country: Austria
- Languages: German; English

Attack of the Lederhosen Zombies is a 2016 Austrian comedy horror film directed by Dominik Hartl and based on a screenplay written by Hartl and Armin Prediger. The film had its world premiere on 4 April 2016 at the Brussels International Fantastic Film Festival and stars Laurie Calvert, Gabriela Marcinková, and Oscar Dyekjær Giese as three young people who must defend themselves against the undead on a snowy mountaintop.

== Plot synopsis ==
Steve is an immature professional snowboarder that has just been stranded in the mountains with his girlfriend/manager Branka and Joschi, a fellow snowboarder, as a result of a prank he played during a publicity video for their sponsor. The trio manages to take shelter in a mountaintop hotel, only for things to grow increasingly more dire after they discover that the resort owner's experiment to make snow in warmer temperatures has turned the local wildlife and humans into bloodthirsty zombies.

== Cast ==
- Laurie Calvert as Steve
- Gabriela Marcinková as Branka
- Oscar Dyekjær Giese as Josh
- Margarete Tiesel as Rita
- Karl Fischer as Franz
- Kari Rakkola as Chekov
- Martin Loos as Knaup
- Patricia Aulitzky as Hilde

== Production ==
The film was produced by Fischer Film, with Markus Fischer serving as producer. It received support from the Austrian Film Institute, FISA, ORF, Cine Art, the states of Lower Austria and Upper Austria, and BLS Südtirol.

The film was released theatrically in Austria on December 23, 2016.

== Reception ==
The film holds a rating of 55% on Rotten Tomatoes, based on 11 reviews, and has an average rating of 5/10. The Guardian rated the movie at two out of five stars, writing that "The acting is wooden and the special effects aren’t all that special, but it’s a spirited effort and doesn’t drag during its 78 minutes." Empire magazine was slightly more positive, stating "Rising to the challenge of doing something new(ish) with an overworked subgenre, this may not be particularly scary or funny. But it belies its modest budget to splatter to knowing effect." SciFiNow espoused a similar view, commenting that it "at least tries to do something a bit different with a subgenre that long became saturated past the point of no return. It falls firmly into the ‘disposable fun’ category, but ultimately it isn't much more than that."
