= Margaret Mills =

Margaret Mills may refer to:

- Margaret Mills (folklorist) (born 1946), folklorist and professor
- Margaret Mills (actress) (died 1717), British stage actress
- Margaret Mills (bowls), Zimbabwean lawn bowler
