= Alex Proyas =

Australian film director

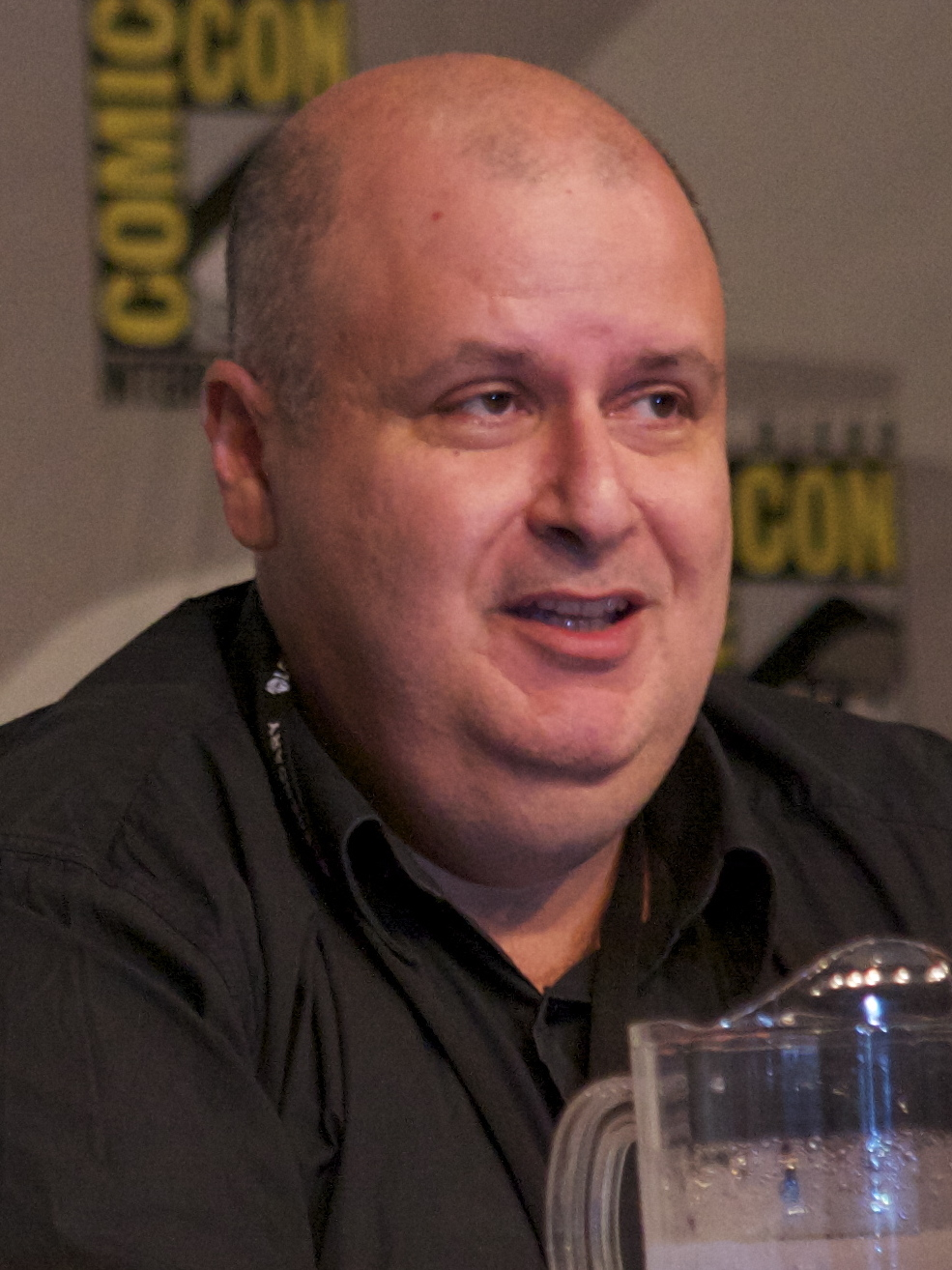
- Proyas in 2011
- Born: Alexander Proyas; 23 September 1963 (age 63); Alexandria, United Arab Republic
- Occupations: Film director; producer; screenwriter
- Years active: 1980–present
- Spouse: Catherine Linsley

Alexander Proyas (/ˈprɔɪəs/ PROY-əs; born 23 September 1963) is an Australian filmmaker. He is known for directing the films The Crow (1994), Dark City (1998), I, Robot (2004) and Knowing (2009).

== Early life ==
Alexander Proyas was born in Alexandria (then in the United Arab Republic and now in Egypt) on 23 September 1963, the son of a Greek Cypriot mother and a father from Egypt whose Greek ancestors had moved to Egypt many generations ago.

When he was three years old, the family moved to Australia, where he grew up in the Sydney suburb of Waterloo. He grew up on a housing estate where the main tenants were fellow immigrants and Indigenous Australians, with whom he felt a kinship because they were all often subjected to racism by white Australians.

At age 17, he joined the Australian Film, Television and Radio School and began directing music videos shortly after.

He later moved to Los Angeles to further his career, working on MTV music videos and TV commercials.

== Career ==
Proyas' first feature film was the independent science fiction thriller Spirits of the Air, Gremlins of the Clouds, which was nominated for two Australian Film Institute awards in 1988, for costume design and production design and which won a Special Prize at the 1990 Yubari International Fantastic Film Festival.

Next, Proyas directed the 1994 superhero fantasy thriller The Crow starring Brandon Lee. Lee was killed in an accident during filming, only eight days before the completion of the film on 31 March 1993. After Lee's death, Proyas and his producers decided to complete the film, partially rewriting the script and using a stunt double and special effects to film the remaining scenes. The Crow was released in May 1994 and was a box office and critical success.

Proyas then wrote, directed and produced the 1998 science fiction thriller Dark City, which received positive critical reception and won several awards, but was a commercial disappointment. In 2004, he directed I, Robot starring Will Smith, a science fiction film suggested by the Isaac Asimov short story compilation I, Robot and was a box office success despite mixed reviews.

Proyas' next film, the thriller Knowing starring Nicolas Cage, began production in Melbourne in March 2008 and opened in North America in March 2009.

Proyas directed Gods of Egypt, starring Nikolaj Coster-Waldau, and co-written by Matt Sazama and Burk Sharpless. The film was critically panned upon its release in 2016 and bombed at the box office.

In 2019, Proyas founded a production company in Sydney called The Heretic Foundation.

In 2021, Proyas announced that he was developing a new video platform named VidiVerse for independent filmmakers as an alternative to YouTube.

In 2024, Proyas began filming R.U.R., a musical adaptation of the play of the same name by Karel Čapek.

== Personal life ==
Proyas has long been married to artist Catherine "Cathy" Linsley, who worked in the art department for his first feature film Spirits of the Air, Gremlins of the Clouds. She has also worked in various capacities on short films and animations produced or written by Proyas. She was thanked in the credits of his film Knowing.

== Filmography ==
=== Feature film ===
| Year | Title | Director | Producer | Writer |
|---|---|---|---|---|
| 1989 | Spirits of the Air, Gremlins of the Clouds | Yes | Yes | Yes |
| 1994 | The Crow | Yes | No | No |
| 1998 | Dark City | Yes | Yes | Yes |
| 2002 | Garage Days | Yes | Yes | Yes |
| 2004 | I, Robot | Yes | No | No |
| 2009 | Knowing | Yes | Yes | No |
| 2016 | Gods of Egypt | Yes | Yes | No |
| TBA | R.U.R. | Yes | Yes | Yes |
| 2027 | Cortés | Yes | No | No |

=== Short film ===
| Year | Title | Director | Writer | Notes |
|---|---|---|---|---|
| 1980 | Neon | Yes | No | Co-directed with Salik Silverstein |
| 1980 | Groping | Yes | No | Co-directed with Salik Silverstein; also cinematographer |
| 1981 | Strange Residues | Yes | No | Also editor |
| 1987 | Spineless | Yes | No | Also actor |
| 1994 | Book of Dreams: Welcome to Crateland | Yes | Yes | Also cinematographer |
| 1995 | Book of Dreams: Dream 7 – Ruben's Dream | Yes | Yes | |
| 2019 | Phobos | Yes | Yes | |
| 2021 | Mask of the Evil Apparition | Yes | Yes | Set in the Dark City cinematic universe |

=== Music video ===
| Year | Title | Artist |
|---|---|---|
| 1980 | "Ricky's Hand" | Fad Gadget |
| 1983 | "Flicker" | Fetus Productions |
| 1985 | "In Your Eyes" | Dropbears |
| 1986 | "Kiss the Dirt" | INXS |
| 1986 | "Don't Dream It's Over" | Crowded House |
| 1987 | "Holiday" | The Other Ones |
| 1987 | "Rhythm of Love" | Yes |
| 1988 | "Better Be Home Soon" | Crowded House |
| 1988 | "Magic Touch" | Mike Oldfield |
| 1989 | "Bring Down the Moon" | Boy Meets Girl |
| 1989 | "Nineteen Forever" | Joe Jackson |
| 1989 | "Mysteries of Love" | Alphaville |
| 1994 | "When We Dance" | Sting |

== Awards and nominations ==
| Year | Award | Category | Title | Result | Ref. |
|---|---|---|---|---|---|
| 1987 | ARIA Music Awards | Best Video | "Don't Dream It's Over" | Won | |
| 1987 | ARIA Music Awards | Best Video | "Kiss the Dirt" | Nominated | |
| 1994 | Cannes Film Festival | Short Film Palme d'Or | Book of Dreams: Welcome to Crateland | Nominated | |
| 1994 | Saturn Awards | Best Director | The Crow | Nominated | |
| 1998 | Imagine Film Festival | Silver Scream Award | Dark City | Won | |
| 1998 | Bram Stoker Award | Best Screenplay | Dark City | Won | |
| 1998 | Brussels International Fantastic Film Festival | Pegasus Audience Award | Dark City | Won | |
| 1998 | Saturn Awards | Best Science Fiction Film | Dark City | Won | |
| 1998 | Saturn Awards | Best Director | Dark City | Nominated | |
| 1998 | Saturn Awards | Best Writing | Dark City | Nominated | |
| 2016 | Golden Raspberry Awards | Worst Picture | Gods of Egypt | Nominated | |
| 2016 | Golden Raspberry Awards | Worst Director | Gods of Egypt | Nominated | |
