= Everything Will Be Okay =

2015 film by Patrick Vollrath

- Film poster
- German: Alles wird gut
- Directed by: Patrick Vollrath
- Written by: Patrick Vollrath
- Produced by: Patrick Vollrath
- Starring: Simon Schwarz; Julia Pointner; Marion Rottenhofer; Daniel Keberle; Gisela Salcher
- Cinematography: Sebastian Thaler
- Edited by: Patrick Vollrath
- Release date: January 2015 (Germany)
- Running time: 30 minutes
- Countries: Germany; Austria
- Language: German

Everything Will Be Okay (German: Alles wird gut) is a 2015 drama short film written and directed by Patrick Vollrath.

The movie was nominated for the Academy Award for Best Live Action Short Film at the 88th Academy Awards.

== Plot ==
A divorced father, Michael Baumgartner, picks up his daughter Lea for the bimonthly weekend visit. Everything seems normal until Lea starts to understand that her father intends to take her out of the country and away from her mother. Their flight gets cancelled, which forces them to stay at the airport hotel for the next night. Lea is able to contact her mother who calls the police. The next morning Lea is united with her mother.

== Cast ==
- Simon Schwarz as Michael Baumgartner
- Julia Pointner as Lea
- Marion Rottenhofer
- Daniel Keberle
- Gisela Salcher

== Awards and nominations ==
The film won many awards, including the Audience Award at the Milan Film Festivaly, the Alberto Sanchez Special Award at the Huesca International Film Festival (Spain), Best Medium Length Film at the Max Ophüls Film Festival (Germany), Best Director Award at Studio Hamburg Up-and-Coming Award, Best Actress and Best Film at the Manchester Film Festival, Best International Film at the Portobello Film Festival in London, and Best Short Film at the Yerevan International Film Festival in Armenia.

Award	Date of ceremony	Category	Recipients and nominees	Result
Academy Awards	February 28, 2016	Best Live Action Short Film	Patrick Vollrath	Nominated
Smita Patil International Film Festival	2016	Best Short Film	Patrick Vollrath	Won
Golden Apricot	2015	Apricot Stone	Alles wird gut	Won
