= Patrick Vollrath =

German filmmaker

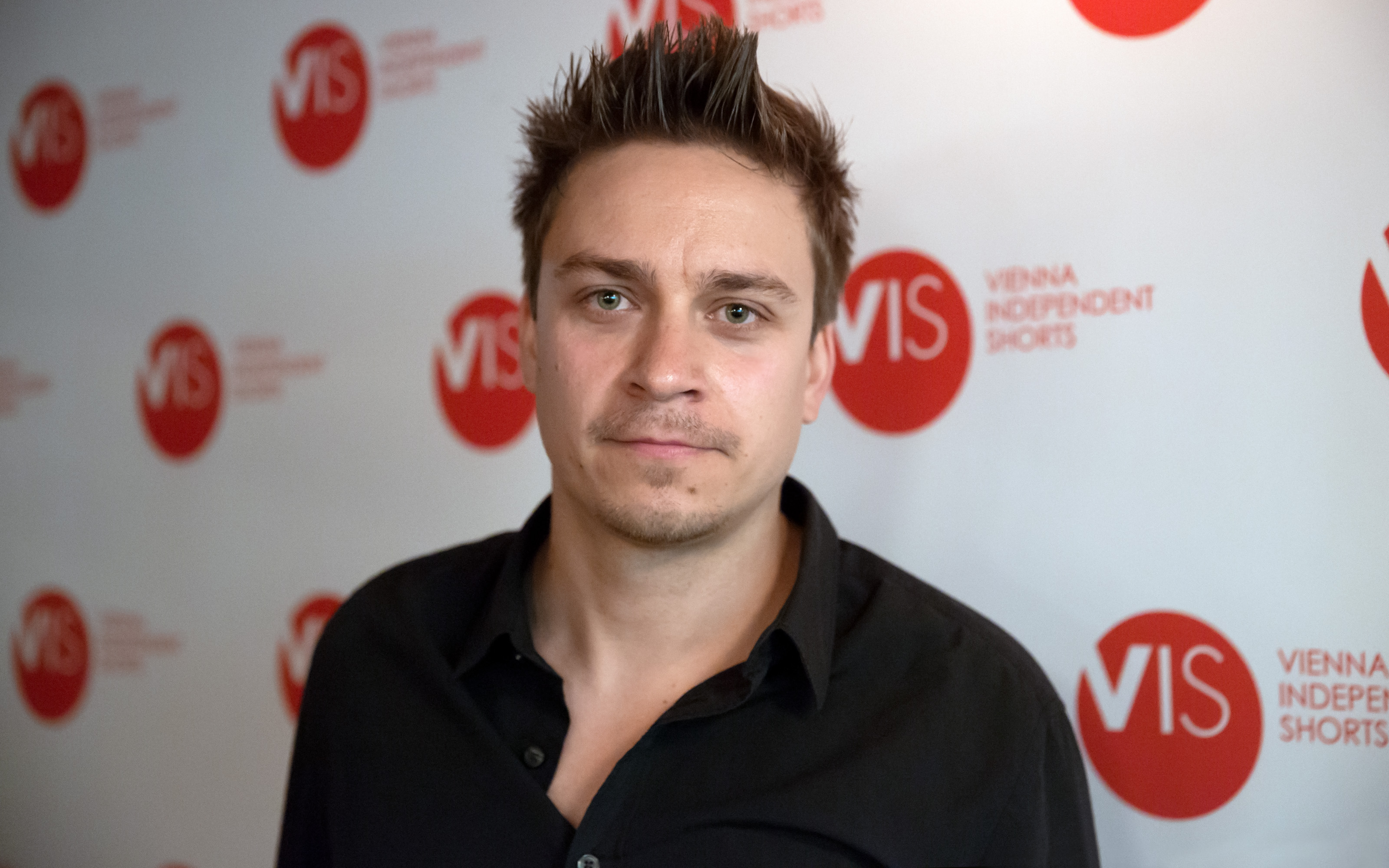
- Patrick Vollrath (VIS 2015
- Born: 1985 (age 40–41)
- Occupation: Filmmaker

Patrick Vollrath (born 1985 in Osterode am Harz) is a German filmmaker, best known for his short film Everything Will Be Okay that earned him critical appraisal and several awards and nominations including Best Foreign Film Award Bronze Medal at 42nd Annual Student Film Awards, and Academy Award for Best Live Action Short Film nomination at the 88th Academy Awards.

== Filmography ==
Short film

Year	Title	Director	Writer	Producer
2009	C'est la Wien	Yes	Yes	Yes
2009	Wie weit	Yes	Yes	No
2010	Sleeping Perv Is World Famous for 5 Minutes	Yes	Yes	Yes
2011	Gradska Deca	Yes	Yes	No
2013	Ketchup Kid	Yes	Yes	No
2014	Behind the Door (German: Hinter der Tür)	Yes	Yes	No
2014	The Jacket (German: Die Jacke )	Yes	Yes	Yes
2015	Everything Will Be Okay (German: Alles wird gut)	Yes	Yes	Yes

Feature film

- 7500 (2019) (Also writer)
- Subversion (TBA)

== Awards ==
Year	Award	Category	Nominated work(s)	Result
2015	Cannes Film Festival	Rail d'Or Award	Everything Will Be Okay (Alles Wird Gut)	Won
2015	Student Academy Awards	Best Foreign Film Award Gold Medal	Everything Will Be Okay (Alles Wird Gut)	Won
2016	Academy Awards	Best Live Action Short Film	Everything Will Be Okay (Alles Wird Gut)	Nominated
