= Gene Gregorits =

American novelist

Justin Gene Gregorits (born November 5, 1976) is an American writer, editor and publisher. He founded and published Sex & Guts Magazine, an independent arts and culture journal, that ran from 1997 to 2004. Subsequent works include Johnny Behind The Deuce, Sex & Guts Anthology, Sex & Guts 4, Midnight Mavericks, Dog Days: Volume One, Dog Days: Volume Two, Hatchet Job: The Gene Gregorits Reader, and Fishhook. Gregorits' most recent works have been described as having running themes of poverty, sexuality, trauma, mental illness, violence, multi-substance abuse and death. He has said that early influences on his writing included Charles Bukowski and Louis-Ferdinand Céline.

== Bibliography ==
- Sex and Guts 4(2002)
- Midnight Mavericks: Reports From The Underground (2007)
- HATCHET JOB: The Gene Gregorits Reader (2012)
- Dog Days: Volume One (2012)
- Dog Days: Volume Two (2013)
- Johnny Behind The Deuce (2013)
- Sex and Guts Anthology (2013)
- Dog Days Omnibus (2013)
- Fishook Volume One (2013)
- The Portland Eight Mile (2014)
- Do You Love Me: The Gene Gregorits File (2014)
- The Portable Gene Gregorits (2014)
- Terry Gilliam's Fear and Loathing in Las Vegas: The Untold Story (2014)
- Intra-Coastal: One Year On St Pete Beach (Volume One) (2014)
- Stretch Marks (2015)
- Meet Me Down The Alley (2016)
- Bigger Than Life at the Edge of the City (2017)
- SPOOK: My Kate Like The Seashore: Volume One (2019)
- Teenage Lust: My Kate Like The Seashore: Volume Two (2021)
- Northern Soul: My Kate Like The Seashore: Volume Three (2023)
- The Night: My Kate Like The Seashore: Volume Four (2023)

== As a contributing writer ==
- Chelsea Hotel Manhattan: A Raw Eulogy To A New York Icon (2008)
- Antique Children: A Mischievous Literary Arts Journal (2010)
- Analysing David Peace (Katy Shaw, editor. Cambridge Scholars Publishing) (2011)

== Film work ==
- Born To Lose: The Last Rock'n'Roll Movie (Lech Kowalski, 1999) (graphic designer, promotion)
- Ronni Lee (Ron Athey, 2000) (lead actor)
- Blank Generation (Celine Dahnier, 2006) (actor)
- The Sand Trap (Casey Fischer, 2012) (subject)
- The Second Coming (Richard Wolstencroft, 2014) (lead actor)
