= Melbourne Underground Film Festival =

The Melbourne Underground Film Festival (MUFF) is an Australian independent film festival featuring mostly genre, controversial, transgressive and avant garde material.

== History ==
The Melbourne Underground Film Festival was formed out of disagreements over the content and running of the Melbourne International Film Festival (MIFF). When director Richard Wolstencroft's film Pearls Before Swine was not accepted by the Melbourne International Film Festival, Wolstencroft claimed it was because his film was too confrontational for the tastes of MIFF. As a response to the film's rejection by MIFF, Wolstencroft founded MUFF in 2000 as an alternative independent film festival, featuring mostly genre, controversial, transgressive and avant garde material. However, this is ironic as the cult film Nekromantik was denied from being screened at the festival in 2001. MUFF has been known for controversy with a screening of Bruce LaBruce's LA Zombie gaining worldwide attention including coverage in the New York Times.

Over the years, the festival has been outspoken on the need to make more local genre films, and has championed many issues of freedom of speech and outsider politics and ideas. The festival has also discovered (first world festival to show the work of) Australian directors like James Wan, Greg McLean, Scott Ryan, Spierig brothers, Stuart Simpson, Patrick Hughes, Andrew Traucki, Dave de Vries, David Nerlich, Neil McGregor, Mark Savage and many others. International Guests of MUFF have included Bruce LaBruce, Lloyd Kaufman, William Lustig, Ron Jeremy, American film director Chris Folino, Michael Tierney, Peter Christopherson, Jim Van Bebber, Bret Easton Ellis, Gene Gregorits, Terry McMahon, Larry Wessel and Geretta Geretta.
