= Simon Stone =

Australian film and theatre director

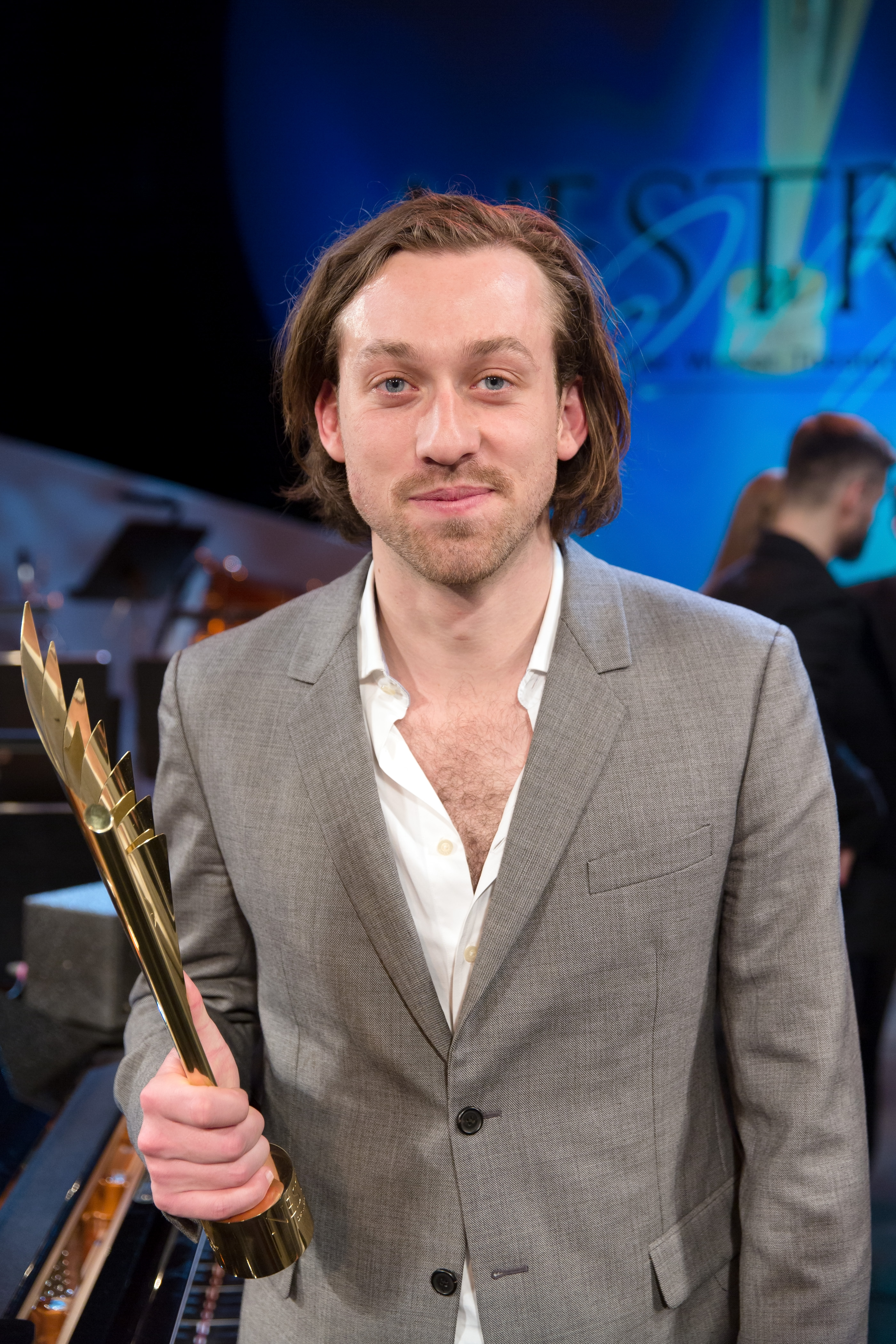
- Receiving the Nestroy Theatre Prize 2015
- Born: 1984 (age 41–42); Basel, Switzerland
- Occupations: Director, actor, writer
- Years active: 2002–present

Simon Stone (born 1984) is an Australian film and theatre director, writer and actor.

== Early life and education ==
Simon Stone was born in 1984 in Basel, Switzerland. He grew up in Melbourne, Australia, and Cambridge, England, where he was educated. His father, Stuart Stone, was a biochemist and his mother, Eleanor Mackie, a veterinary scientist. Stuart Stone died of a heart attack aged 45; Stone, aged 12 at the time, witnessed it, and has spoken about the ways in which that trauma has influenced his work.

He decided to be an actor at the age of 15, and set to reading the complete works of Shakespeare in chronological order.

== Career ==
=== Theatre ===
In 2007 Stone founded the independent theatre company The Hayloft Project and adapted and directed their inaugural production of Frank Wedekind's Spring Awakening. This production was remounted in 2008 at Belvoir St Theatre and was described in The Sydney Morning Herald as "a lean, contained, ultimately furious, liberating production that is well-attuned to Wedekind's poetic rhythms, wit and pubescent discoveries". Other productions Stone adapted and directed for The Hayloft Project include Platonov, 3xSisters, The Suicide and The Only Child, a new version of Henrik Ibsen's Little Eyolf, which won the Sydney Theatre Award for Best Independent Production.

In 2009 he directed Aleksei Arbuzov's The Promise for Belvoir. In 2010 he directed and co-wrote with Mark Leonard Winter, Thomas Henning and Chris Ryan a version of Seneca's Thyestes for The Hayloft Project and Malthouse Theatre, Melbourne. He directed The Cherry Orchard for Melbourne Theatre Company in 2013.

In 2011 Stone became the resident director at Belvoir. In his first year he wrote and directed The Wild Duck, after Henrik Ibsen, which has become his calling card production and has played internationally, including at the Holland Festival. In 2011 he also directed Robyn Nevin in Lally Katz's Neighbourhood Watch for Belvoir and adapted and directed Bertolt Brecht's Baal for the Sydney Theatre Company.

Brochure for Ibsen House (in Dutch), made with Internationaal Theater Amsterdam, staged in deSingel in Antwerp (2019)

For Theater Basel, where he was a house director from 2015, he has directed Angels in America, John Gabriel Borkman (for which he won the 2015 Nestroy Theatre Prize), Three Sisters, and Korngold's opera Die tote Stadt. A companion project with the works of August Strindberg, Hotel Strindberg, premiered at Theater Basel in 2018.

For Ivo van Hove's company Internationaal Theater Amsterdam, he has directed Euripides' Medea in his own new adaptation, Husbands and Wives, Ibsen House, a new play by Stone which threads together the plots of several of Ibsen's plays in a new modern scenario, and Flight 49, inspired by the novel Op Hoop van Zegen by Herman Heijermans.

In 2016, Stone premiered an adaptation of Federico García Lorca's Yerma at the Young Vic in London. The production starred Billie Piper in the title role, and was well reviewed, returning for a second run in 2017 before transferring to the Park Avenue Armory in New York in 2018. It won the Laurence Olivier Award for Best Revival in 2017.

Stone directed Luigi Cherubini's opera Médée at the 2019 Salzburg Festival, returning there in 2023 for Martinů's The Greek Passion sung in English. He took his production of Euripides' Medea, with Rose Byrne and Bobby Cannavale, to the Brooklyn Academy of Music in 2020. He made his debut at the Metropolitan Opera in New York in 2022 with Donizetti's Lucia di Lammermoor, set in present-day America's Rust Belt.

In 2023, he directed Arrigo Boito's Mefistofele for the opening night of the new season of the Teatro dell'Opera di Roma in Rome, Italy.

His updated adaptation of Phaedra was produced at the National Theatre in London from February to April 2023; the company included Mackenzie Davis, Assaad Bouab and Janet McTeer.

=== Film ===
Stone appeared in the films Kokoda (2006), Jindabyne (2006), and Balibo (2009), before turning to theatre direction.

Stone's directorial debut feature film The Daughter, which he also wrote, premiered at the 2015 Toronto International Film Festival and was released in Australia on 17 March 2016. He won Best Adapted Screenplay at the AACTA Awards for his work.

He directed the British drama film The Dig in 2021. It focuses on an archaeological dig in Sutton Hoo in 1939.

=== Television ===
Stone has acted in the television series John Safran's Music Jamboree, MDA, Blue Heelers, Rush, City Homicide, and the films Jindabyne, Kokoda, Balibo, Blame, and The Eye of the Storm.

== Philosophy and style ==
Stone likes to take pieces from the standard theatre canon which, with the help of his cast, he reworks into intimate, almost cinematic performances. He often works from improvisation creating an entirely new script through which the original play nevertheless shines. This practice is sometimes referred to as "over-writing".

Stone believes in theatre as a place for polemic: "One can't make theatre based on fear and compromises. Without argument, there is no art."

Yet, at the same time, he acknowledges that his own art has its roots in finding a language for the trauma of his father's death. "I certainly couldn't talk to people about what had happened to me. Especially at a young age, people are very confronted by 'how on earth do I even talk about that absurdly dark thing that happened to Simon?'. Of course, in cinema and literature, you find conversation partners. They're not talking back but they kind of are because they're telling you you're not the only person who's been through that thing".

== Personal life ==
Stone married Jessamy Dyer in 2004 though the marriage ended in divorce. He then married Stefanie Hackl, a dramaturge.

== Works and performances ==
=== Film ===
Director

- The Turning (2013) (segment "Reunion")
- The Daughter (2015) (also writer)
- The Dig (2021)
- The Woman in Cabin 10 (2025)
- Elsinore (2026)

Stage director

- Verdi: La Traviata (2019) (Direct-to-video)
- Die Teufel von Loudun (2022) (Direct-to-video)

Acting roles

Year	Title	Role	Notes
2006	Kokoda: 39th Battalion	Max Scholt	
2006	Jindabyne	Billy 'The Kid'	
2008	Nice Shootin' Cowboy	Cormac	Short film
2009	Balibo	Tony Maniaty	
2010	A Love Story	Robin	Short film
2010	Blame	Nick	
2011	The Eye of the Storm	Peter	
2012	Being Venice	Lenny	

=== Television ===
Director

- National Theatre Live: Yerma (2017) (TV movie)

Stage director

Year	Title	Notes
2021	Korngold: Die Tote Stadt	TV movie
2022	The Metropolitan Opera HD Live	Episode "Donizetti: Lucia di Lammermoor"

Acting roles

Year	Title	Role	Notes
2002–2003	MDA	Jason Henderson	5 episodes
2002–2005	Blue Heelers	Mary Farris / Clayton Sanders	
2009	City Homicide	Billy Pierce / Will Fenech	1 episode
2009	Rush	Ted Holston	1 episode

=== Theater ===
Year	Title	Director	Artistic Director	Adaptor	Venue
2007–2009	Spring Awakening	Yes	No	No	Fortyfivedownstairs, Melbourne, Belvoir Street Theatre, Sydney, Arts House Meat Market, Melbourne with The Hayloft Project
2006	Chekhov Re-Cut: Platonov	No	Yes	Yes	The Hayloft, Melbourne
2008	The Soldier's Tale	No	No	Yes	Sacred Heart Chapel, Melbourne with The Hayloft Project
2008	Pool (No Water)	Yes	No	No	Red Stitch Actors Theatre, Melbourne
2009	Three Sisters	Yes	Yes	No	Arts House Meat Market, Melbourne with The Hayloft Project
2009	Leaves of Glass	Yes	No	No	Red Stitch Actors Theatre, Melbourne
2009	The Promise	Yes	No	No	Belvoir Street Theatre, Sydney
2009	Rough Draft #3	Yes	No	No	Wharf Theatre, Sydney with STC
2009	The Only Child	Yes	Yes	No	Belvoir Street Theatre, Sydney with The Hayloft Project
2009	B.C.	Yes	Yes	No	BlackBox, Melbourne with The Hayloft Project
2010	Yuri Wells	No	Yes	No	The Garden of Unearthly Delights, Adelaide with The Hayloft Project
2010	The Suicide	Yes	Yes	Yes	Belvoir Street Theatre, Sydney with The Hayloft Project
2010; 2012	Thyestes	Yes	Yes	Yes	Tower Theatre, Melbourne, Carriageworks, Sydney with The Hayloft Project
2010	The Nest	No	Yes	No	Northcote Town Hall, Melbourne with The Hayloft Project
2011	Baal	Yes	No	No	Malthouse Theatre, Melbourne, Wharf Theatre with STC
2011–2016	The Wild Duck	Yes	No	No	Belvoir Street Theatre, Sydney, Malthouse Theatre, Melbourne, Nationaltheatret, Oslo, Halle E i MuseumsQuartier, Vienna, Muziekgebouw aan 't IJ, Amsterdam, Barbican Theatre, London, Heath Ledger Theatre, Perth
2011; 2014	Neighbourhood Watch	Yes	No	No	Belvoir Street Theatre, Sydney, Southbank Theatre, Melbourne with MTC
2012	Strange Interlude	Yes	No	Yes	Belvoir Street Theatre, Sydney
2012	Death of a Salesman	Yes	No	No	Belvoir Street Theatre, Sydney, Geelong Arts Centre, Theatre Royal Sydney
2012	Face to Face	Yes	No	Yes	Sydney Theatre with STC
2013	Cat on a Hot Tin Roof	Yes	No	No	Belvoir Street Theatre, Sydney, Theatre Royal Sydney
2013	The Cherry Orchard	Yes	No	Yes	Southbank Theatre, Melbourne with MTC
2013	Miss Julie	No	No	Yes	Belvoir Street Theatre, Sydney
2013	Hamlet	Yes	No	No	Belvoir Street Theatre, Sydney
2014	Die Orestie	Yes	No	No	Theater Oberhausen, Germany
2014	The Government Inspector	Yes	No	Yes	Malthouse Theatre, Melbourne, Belvoir Street Theatre, Sydney
2014–2015; 2018	Thyestes	Yes	No	Yes	Theater Bellevue, Amsterdam, Théâtre Nanterre-Amandiers, France, Space Theatre, Adelaide with The Hayloft Project
2014	Medea	Yes	No	Yes	Stadsschouwburg, Amsterdam
2015–2019	John Gabriel Borkman	Yes	No	No	Burgtheater Vienna, Theater Basel, Switzerland, Haus der Berliner Festspiele, Berlin, Theatre Basel, Switzerland, Grand Théâtre de Luxembourg, Akademietheater, Vienna, Thalia-Theater, Hamburg, The State Theatre of Nations, Moscow
2016–2019	Husbands and Wives	Yes	No	No	Stadsschouwburg Amsterdam, deSingel, Antwerpen, Belgium, Stadsschouwburg Amsterdam
2015	Rocco und seiner Brüder	Yes	No	No	Münchner Kammerspiele, Munich
2015	Angels in America	Yes	No	No	Theatre Basel, Switzerland
2016	Peer Gynt	Yes	No	No	Deutsches Schauspielhaus, Hamburg, Nationaltheatret, Oslo
2016–2019	Drei Schwestern (Three Sisters)	Yes	No	No	Theatre Basel, Switzerland, Haus der Berliner Festspiele, Berlin, Theater im Pfalzbau, Ludwigshafen, Germany, Pushkin Drama Theatre, Moscow, Residenztheater, Munich
2017	Rocco et ses Freres (Rocco and His Brothers)	Yes	No	No	Théâtre des Célestins, Lyon, France
2017	Lear	Yes	No	No	Felsenreitschule, Salzburg for Salzburg Festival
2017–2018	Yerma	Yes	No	No	Young Vic Theatre, London, Park Avenue Armory, Manhattan
2017–2021	Ibsen House	Yes	No	No	Stadsschouwburg Amsterdam, Cour du Lycee Saint-Joseph, Avignon, France, Schaubühne am Lehniner Platz, Berlin, deSingel, Antwerpen, Belgium, Online – International
2017–2018	Les Trois Soeurs (The Three Sisters)	Yes	No	No	Odéon -Théâtre de l'Europe, France, Théâtre National Populaire, Villeurbanne, France, Teatro Carignano, Turin, Italy, deSingel, Antwerpen, Belgium, Le Quai, Angers, France
2018	Eine Griechische Trilogie (A Greek Trilogy)	Yes	No	No	Theater am Schiffbauerdamm, Berlin with Berliner Ensemble
2018–2020	Medea	Yes	No	Yes	Teatros del Canal, Madrid, Barbican Theatre, London, Großes Festspielhaus, Salzburg, Brooklyn Academy of Music, Zorlu PSM, Istanbul, Theater im Pfalzbau, Germany
2018–2019	Hotel Strindberg	Yes	No	No	Burgtheater Vienna, Theater Basel, Switzerland, Haus der Berliner Festspiele, Berlin
2018–2019	Husbands and Wives	Yes	No	No	Stadsschouwburg Amsterdam
2018; 2021	Yerma	Yes	No	No	Park Avenue Armory, Manhattan, Schaubühne am Lehniner Platz, Berlin
2019	La Trilogie de la Vengeance (The Vengeance Trilogy)	Yes	No	No	Odéon-Théâtre de l’Europe
2019	La Traviata	Yes	No	No	Palais Garnier, Paris
2019; 2021	Die Tote Stadt (The Dead City)	Yes	No	No	National Theatre, Munich
2020–2021	Flight 49	Yes	No	No	Stadsschouwburg, Amsterdam
2021	Tristan und Isolde	Yes	No	No	Grand Théâtre de Provence, France
2021	Unsere Zeit (Our Time)	Yes	No	No	Residenztheater, Munich
2022	Wozzeck	Yes	No	No	Vienna State Opera
2022	Lucia di Lammermoor	Yes	No	No	Metropolitan Opera House, New York, Dorothy Chandler Pavilion, Los Angeles
2022	Angels in America	Yes	No	No	Residence Theatre
2023	Phaedra	Yes	No	Yes	Lyttelton Theatre, London with Royal National Theatre
2023	Innocence	Yes	No	No	Royal Opera House, London
2024-26	The Cherry Orchard	Yes	No	Yes	LG Arts Center SEOUL, Busan Cultural Center, Hong Kong Cultural Center, Esplanade – Theatres on the Bay, Singapore, Adelaide Festival Centre, Park Avenue Armory, New York
2025	The Lady from the Sea	Yes	No	Yes	Bridge Theatre, London
2026	The Oresteia	Yes	No	Yes	Bridge Theatre, London

Dramaturge

Year	Title	Venue
2010–2011	Human Interest Story	Malthouse Theatre, Melbourne, Belvoir Street Theatre, Sydney

Acting roles

Year	Title	Venue
2001	Antony and Cleopatra	Melbourne Grammar School
2002	The Bridge	Butter Factory Theatre, Wodonga with HotHouse Theatre
2002	The Sea	University of Melbourne
2006	Sugar Mountain	Cinema Nova, Melbourne
2006	A Kind of Hush	Cinema Nova, Melbourne
2006	Jet of Blood	Theatre Works, Melbourne
2007	Ashes to Ashes	Fortyfivedownstairs, Melbourne
2007	Who's Afraid of Virginia Woolf?	Belvoir Street Theatre, Sydney
2008	Miss Julie	Belvoir Street Theatre, Sydney

== See also ==
- List of English speaking theatre directors in the 20th and 21st centuries
