= Zalar =

Zalar is a surname. The surname means "cottager", or tenant. The word comes from Austrian & German languages. Notable people with the surname include:

- Miro Zalar (born 1957), Swedish pole vaulter
- Tasia Zalar (born 1992), indigenous Australian actress
- Živko Zalar (born 1948), Croatian cinematographer
