= Broke (2016 film) =

2016 Australian drama film by Heath Davis

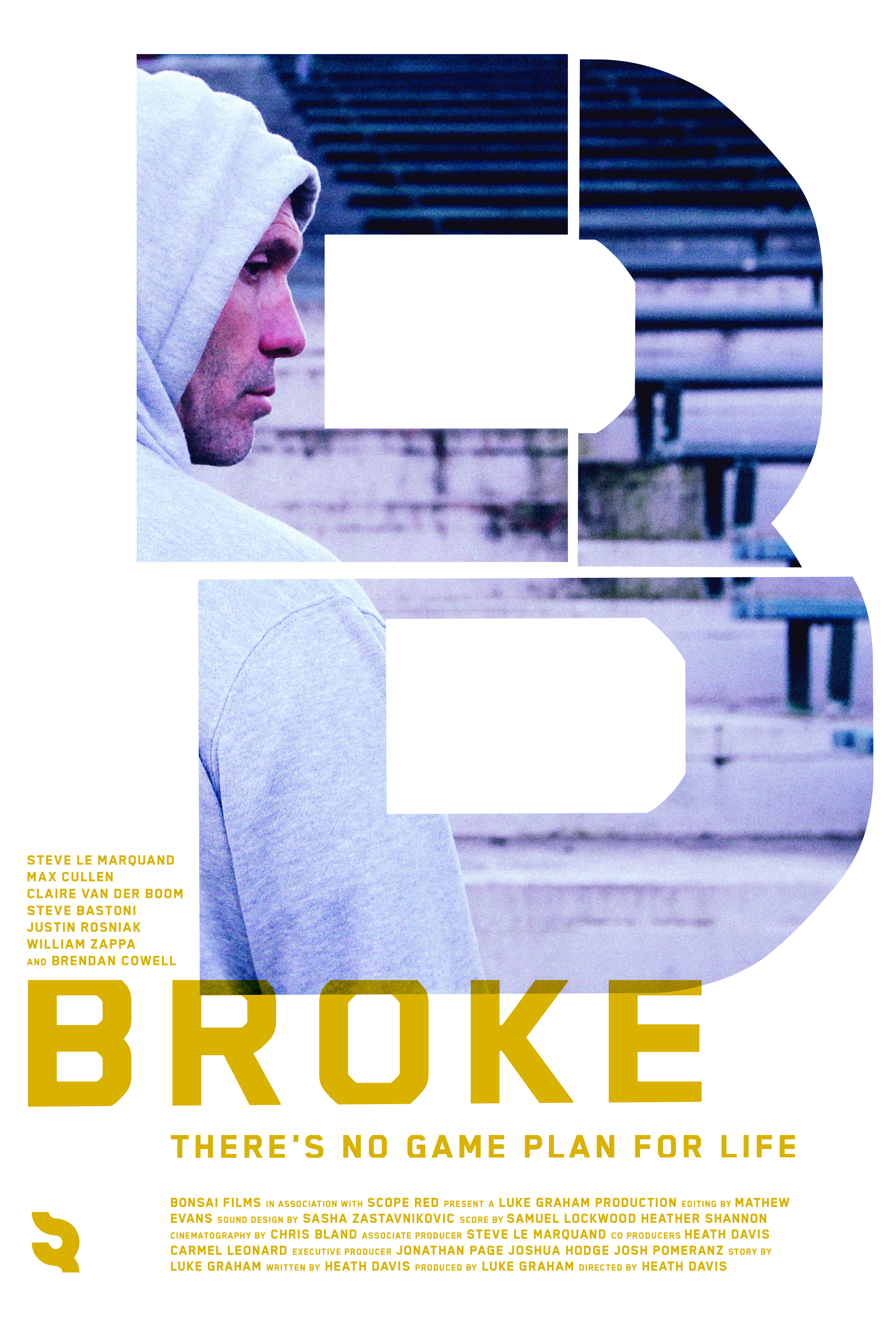
- Broke Poster
- Directed by: Heath Davis
- Written by: Heath Davis
- Produced by: Luke Graham
- Starring: Steve Bastoni; Brendan Cowell; Max Cullen; Steve Le Marquand
- Cinematography: Chris Bland
- Edited by: Mat Evans
- Music by: Sam Lockwood, Heather Shannon
- Production company: Scope Red
- Distributed by: Bonsai Films
- Release date: 3 April 2016
- Running time: 95 minutes
- Country: Australia
- Language: English
- Budget: $150,000

Broke is a 2016 Australian drama film from Queensland production house Scope Red. The film was produced by Luke Graham and directed by Heath Davis. It is based on the ups and downs of rugby league and was shot on location in Gladstone, Queensland, and Rockhampton.

The film centres on fictional rugby league footballer Ben Kelly, played by Steve Le Marquand, and his struggle with gambling addiction and other mental health issues.

It won a Film Jury Award for Best Screenplay at the 2016 SENE Film, Music and Art Festival.

The soundtrack of Broke contains artists such as Darren Hanlon, Sam Shinazzi and The Holy Soul.

== Cast ==
- Steve Bastoni as Sherro
- Brendan Cowell as Kirk
- Max Cullen as Cec
- Steve Le Marquand as Ben Kelly
- Claire van der Boom as Terri
- Damian Hill as Lionel
- Pippa Grandison as Duty Manager
- Justin Rosniak as Neck
