= Disclosure (2020 Australian film) =

2020 Australian drama film

- Poster
- Directed by: Michael Bentham
- Written by: Michael Bentham
- Produced by: Donna Lyon; CJ Welsh
- Starring: Geraldine Hakewill; Mark Leonard Winter; Matilda Ridgway; Tom Wren
- Cinematography: Mark Carey
- Edited by: Ryan Wade Howard
- Music by: Tony Dupé
- Production companies: Disclosure Productions, Bonsai Films
- Distributed by: Breaking Glass Pictures (North America) Bonsai Films (theatrical) Madman Entertainment (Australia)
- Release date: 6 January 2020 (Palm Springs International Film Festival)
- Running time: 84 minutes
- Country: Australia
- Language: English

Disclosure is a 2020 Australian film written and directed by Michael Bentham; it is his directorial debut and premiered at the Palm Springs Film Festival in January 2020. It is a story about how two sets of parents deal with allegations of child-on-child sexual assault (a four-year-old girl accusing a nine-year-old boy).

At the 11th AACTA Awards the film was nominated Best Indie Film. In 2021 the film was also nominated for an Australian Directors' Guild Award (Best Direction in a Feature Film), and won the 2021 ATOM Award for Best Fiction Feature Film.

== Cast ==
- Geraldine Hakewill as Bek Chalmers
- Mark Leonard Winter as Danny Bowman
- Matilda Ridgway as Emily Bowman
- Tom Wren as Joel Chalmers
- Greg Stone as Steve

== Production ==
Production was completed in 2018 on a shoestring budget without support from the Australian government, with director Michael Bentham describing it as a "micro-budget ensemble drama". Film Daze's Joshua Sorensen stated, "a cursory amount of research indicates that it is unlikely to be higher than a few thousand dollars".

It was shot in the Dandenong Ranges in Victoria, and its first theatrical release was at the Cameo Theatre in Belgrave, close to where filming took place. Its streaming release date in North America was 26 June 2020, and 15 September 2021 in Australia.

== Reception ==
Disclosure received positive reviews from film critics when it screened at Palm Springs International Film Festival. Alex Saveliev of Film Threat gave the film four stars, calling Disclosure "a unique, highly relevant gem" that "marks the arrival of a talent to watch". Variety's Dennis Harvey described Disclosure as "a little firecracker", while Brad Shreiber included Disclosure in his 'Best of 2020 Palm Springs Festival', describing the film as "disturbing in the best possible way".

On Rotten Tomatoes it has an approval rating of 100%. All 40 external reviews listed on IMDb.com have been favourable.

After the film's theatrical release in Australia, Jim Schembri called Disclosure "a blistering, confronting, independently made, issue-driven storm of raw, often excoriating verbal exchanges seething with passion, anger and hot-button topicality". David Stratton stated that "the explosive themes are handled with a forthright candour" in The Australian, while Dave Griffiths gave the film five stars in Heavy magazine, stating that "Disclosure reveals one of the best Australian filmmakers we have seen in years." Disclosure was included in NME's list of 'The 10 Best Australian Films of 2021'.
