= One Eyed Girl =

- Film poster
- Directed by: Nick Remy Matthews
- Written by: Craig Behenna; Nick Remy Matthews
- Produced by: David Ngo
- Starring: Mark Leonard Winter; Tilda Cobham-Hervey; Steve Le Marquand
- Cinematography: Jody Muston
- Edited by: David Ngo
- Music by: Michael Darren
- Production company: Projector Films
- Distributed by: Dark Sky Films
- Release date: 30 April 2015 (Australia)
- Running time: 101 minutes
- Country: Australia
- Language: English
- Budget: A$1 million
- Box office: US$6,273

One Eyed Girl is a 2015 Australian psychological thriller film directed by Nick Remy Matthews and starring Mark Leonard Winter, Tilda Cobham-Hervey, and Steve Le Marquand. Winter plays a troubled psychiatrist who joins a cult after one of his patients commits suicide. It premiered at the Austin Film Festival in October 2014 and was released in Australia in April 2015.

== Plot ==
After seeing several patients, Travis, a troubled psychiatrist, is contacted at home by a patient, Rachel. Travis invites her into his apartment, though he acknowledges this is unorthodox. As they talk, Rachel sees Travis take several pills, which he explains are to help him deal with the mounting stresses in his life. After they kiss, Rachel offers to help him, and Travis laughs derisively. Hurt, Rachel leaves his apartment and goes to the top of the apartment building, where she phones him. When he realises she means to commit suicide, he races upstairs, only to see her leap to her death. After one of his patients taunts him over this rumour, Travis reacts violently and is put on leave, though he angrily quits instead.

Grace, a young woman, hands out pamphlets on a train and invites Travis to a support group. Though dismissive, Travis takes one of her pamphlets. After drinking heavily and becoming depressed over his life, Travis attends the meeting. Travis is disgusted when the group's leader, Father Jay, a military veteran and former drug addict, forces a young member, Marcus, to confront difficult personal issues in public. As Travis leaves, Grace urges him to seek the group's support. After a suicide attempt in which he overdoses on pills, Travis calls the group before slipping into unconsciousness. Father Jay, Grace, and another member, Tom, arrive and induce vomiting, saving his life.

Travis wakes in a wilderness retreat, where Father Jay forces him to go through involuntary drug detoxification. Travis escapes his cabin, only to be recaptured and taken back after he collapses. Travis explains to Grace that he abuses prescription drugs and alcohol to avoid feeling anything, and she reveals her parents abandoned her, leaving her with no family but Father Jay. Though skeptical of Father Jay and his methods, Travis nonetheless agrees to continue his treatment. Travis changes his mind when Father Jay provokes an emotional reaction in Travis by nearly drowning him. Father Jay allows him to leave the compound, but Travis finds he cannot do so and instead begs Father Jay to help him.

Travis makes a breakthrough when Father Jay urges him to confront himself. Travis admits to self-loathing and blames himself for Rachel's death. A flashback to the day of her suicide reveals that Rachel called him on the phone before she jumped, but Travis did not attempt to save her by running upstairs. The other members all hug Travis and tell him that they love him. Travis' faith is shaken when he stumbles on Father Jay as he has sex with Marcus. Later, at a celebration, Grace kisses Travis, but his doubts only grow. Believing Father Jay to have forced himself on the vulnerable Marcus, Travis publicly confronts Father Jay and attempts to get Marcus to leave with him. Father Jay condemns Travis as a lying sociopath who has become jealous of Marcus' recovery, and Travis is banished from the group after being beaten.

As Tom drives him out of the compound, Grace calls for them to wait and joins them. Marcus emerges from the compound with a pistol and fires several shots at the vehicle. When Father Jay tries to talk down Marcus, Marcus shoots Father Jay, then kills himself. Travis attempts to aid Father Jay, but the others will not let him. Before Father Jay dies of blood loss, he advises his followers to avoid the inevitable police persecution. Tom leads Travis into the woods with a rifle but allows Travis to flee. After Tom kills himself, Travis instead returns to the compound, where he finds everyone but Grace has died by suicide. Travis follows her back to the city, where she takes a subway car hostage with a pistol. Travis convinces her to let the people go and takes the pistol from her. When the police storm the subway car, they shoot Travis. Later, Grace tells her story to a psychiatrist.

== Cast ==
- Mark Leonard Winter as Travis
- Tilda Cobham-Hervey as Grace
- Steve Le Marquand as Father Jay
- Craig Behenna as Tom
- Kate Cheel as Rachel
- Matt Crook as Marcus
- Sara West as Sarah

== Production ==
The initial concept for the story did not involve a cult; instead, director and co-writer Matthews sought to explore alternative ways of thinking and living. The story evolved to include a cult when Matthews and co-writer Craig Behenna added a journey for Travis to find redemption and wisdom. Father Jay's philosophy is intentionally kept ambiguous, though they wrote a detailed biography for the character to aid Le Marquand's acting.

Casting used social networking sites to find what producer David Ngo called a more authentic cast. The 'Search for Grace' and 'Search for Marcus' online campaigns auditioned over 600 applicants from all over the world through Facebook and finally discovered rising stars Matt Crook to play Marcus and Tilda Cobham-Hervey to play Grace. Filming began in November 2012.

== Release ==
One Eyed Girl screened at the Adelaide Film Festival on 18 October 2013; an event described by the filmmakers as a "work in progress" screening given that the film at this point, had not yet been soundmixed or colour timed and required some additional photography. The completed film's world premiere was at the Austin Film Festival in the USA, on October 24, 2014, at the Paramount theatre. It was one of two opening night films of the festival that year. The film went on to win the Dark Matters Jury Prize, which was awarded to the film's two writers Nick Remy Matthews and Craig Behenna. It was subsequently released in Australia on 30 April 2015.

== Reception ==
Though he faulted the pacing, Frank Scheck of The Hollywood Reporter wrote, "This engrossing, darkly tinged drama is an auspicious debut." Jake Wilson of The Sydney Morning Herald rated it 2/5 stars and criticised what he said was the film's tendency to be declarative and heavy-handed. Wilson concluded, "Despite its flaws, this Australian feature exposing the dark side of a cult announces director Nick Matthews as a filmmaker of some promise." Charles Maddison of The Independent Weekly called it "an absorbing psychological thriller" that deserves support from Australian audiences.

=== Accolades ===
Award	Category	Subject	Result	Ref
ACS Award	Silver Award	Jody Muston	Won	
ASE Award	Best Editing in a Feature Film	David Ngo	Nominated	
Austin Film Festival	Feature Film Award	Craig Behenna	Won	
Austin Film Festival	Feature Film Award	Nick Remy Matthews	Won	
Beverly Hills Film Festival	Best Film - Audience Choice	Nick Remy Matthews	Won	
