= Steve Le Marquand =

Australian actor

- Born: Steve Le Marquand; 26 December 1967 (age 58); Perth, Western Australia
- Occupation: Actor
- Spouse: Pippa Grandison
- Children: Charlie Le Marquand
- Relatives: Sarrah Le Marquand

Steve Le Marquand (born 26 December 1967) is an Australian actor of stage and screen.

== Early life and education ==
Steve Le Marquand was born in Perth, Western Australia.

Prior to acting, Le Marquand motorcycled his way around Australia, working at various cattle stations, docks, pubs, barges, and melon farms.

He studied performing arts at Penrith in Sydney's outer west at the University of Western Sydney (Theatre Nepean).

== Career ==
=== Television ===
Le Marquand's first acting job was a TV commercial for Arnott's Ruffles, which was banned a day after its release for sacrilege. His second job was on the Australian TV series Police Rescue and since then he has played an assortment of thugs, baddies, larrikins and cops (both good and bad) in a number of TV shows, including Les Norton, Australia's Sexiest Tradie, Janet King; Underbelly: Razor, Rake, Laid, All Saints, Farscape, Crash Palace, Young Lions, Blue Heelers, Water Rats, Big Sky, G.P., Murder Call, Home and Away, Wildside, and the ABC mini-series A Difficult Woman. He played the lead role of Tony Piccolo in the Movie Extra hit Small Time Gangster for which he received an ASTRA Award nomination for Most Outstanding Actor.

In 2021 he appeared in Australia's Sexiest Tradie. In 2023 Marquand was announced as part of the cast for Population 11, the second season of The Twelve. Marquand was later announced as part of the cast for Invisible Boys. Marquand was named as part of the cast for the second series of Mystery Road: Origin.

=== Film ===
On film he has featured as a crazed colonel in Escape and Evasion; a cheeky cabbie in June Again; a psycho gangster in Locusts; a reclusive cattle station worker in Kriv Stender's Red Dog: True Blue; a down and out ex Rugby League star in Heath Davis' Broke; a sleazy, charismatic cult leader in Nick Matthews' One Eyed Girl; a dodgy drug dealer in Stephan Elliott's A Few Best Men; a battle hardened sergeant in Beneath Hill 60 (which earned him a Film Critics Circle of Australia Best Supporting Actor nomination 2009); a snarly stockbroker in 2008's surprise hit, Men's Group; a tall thug in Jeremy Sims’ Last Train to Freo (for which he was nominated for Best Lead Actor at both the Australian Film Institute and Film Critic's Circle Awards); a WWII digger in Kokoda; a larrikin Aussie climber in Martin Campbell's Vertical Limit; a clumsy, shotty-loving bank robber in Gregor Jordan's Two Hands; a moustachioed cop in David Caesar's Mullet; a weird-arsed beachcomber in Lost Things and an all-singing-all-dancing sailor in Disney’s remake of South Pacific.

Le Marquand plays Merrick in the 2025 dark comedy thriller Penny Lane Is Dead, in writer-director Mia'Kate Russell's feature film debut.

=== Theatre ===
Le Marquand has been seen on stage in Green Park, Ugly Mugs, Songket and The Return (which was the stage version of Last Train to Freo) for Griffin Theatre; Gaybies for Darlinghurst Theatre; Enemy of the People, Jasper Jones, Death of a Salesman, Summer of the Seventeenth Doll (also for MTC and QTC), Paul, The Spook, Buried Child and Waiting For Godot for Belvoir; Holy Day for the STC, Don’s Party for the MTC and STC; and was a member of the STC's Actors' Company, where he appeared in Tales From The Vienna Woods; The Serpent's Teeth; Gallipoli and The War of the Roses (alongside Cate Blanchett) with the Company.

Le Marquand (together with Simon Bedak and Michael Neaylon) co-wrote, produced, directed, and starred in a theatre production of the novel He Died with a Felafel in His Hand, which had its humble beginnings at Rozelle's Bridge Hotel in Sydney during 1995 before running for several years in Melbourne, Perth, Adelaide, Lismore, Hobart, Brisbane, Edinburgh, Toronto, New York, Wagga Wagga and Hong Kong. The stage adaptation's 'rough as guts' humour saw it become the longest running play in Australian history.

=== Accolades ===
Le Marquand won the Nicole Kidman Best Actor Award at Tropfest 1996 for (his own) short film Cliché, and was also the lead actor in the Tropfest 2005 hit, Bomb.

In 2019, during The Vision Splendid Outback Film Festival in Winton, Queensland, Le Marquand was honoured with a star on Winton's Walk of Fame.

== Personal life ==
Le Marquand is married to Australian actress and singer Pippa Grandison. They have one son together, Charlie Le Marquand.

He played cricket for a number of years for many different teams and was also selected for various representative teams. His top score was 116* and best bowling figures of 8/9.

His younger sister is the columnist and media commentator Sarrah Le Marquand.

== Filmography ==
=== Film ===
Year	Title	Role	Notes
1996	Cliche	Tim	Short film
1998	In the Winter Dark	Nick	
1998	Bloodlock	Flint	Short film
1999	Two Hands	Wozza	
2000	Vertical Limit	Cyril Bench	
2001	Slipper	Podiatrist	Short film
2001	Mullet	Jones	
2001	The Hitch	Driver	Short film
2002	Sway	Jake	
2003	Lost Things	Zippo	
2003	Ash Wednesday		Short film
2004	Lovesong	Alexander	Short film
2005	Bomb	Man	Short film
2005	Aerosol	The Worker	Short film
2006	Kokoda	Sam	
2006	Last Train to Freo	Tall Thug	
2007	Razzle Dazzle	Bob	
2007	The Manual	Sonny's Father	Short film
2008	Men's Group	Lucas	
2009	Franswa Sharl	Mike Bishop	Short film
2009	Into My Arms	Ben	Short film
2010	Beneath Hill 60	Bill Fraser	
2011	Boys on Film	Mike Bishop	
2011	A Few Best Men	Ray	
2013	One Eyed Girl	Father Jay	
2014	Kill Me Three Times	Sam	
2015	Terminus	Sheriff Williams	
2015	Moth	Peter	Short film
2016	Banana Boy	Bob	Short film
2016	Broke	Ben Kelly	
2016	Red Dog: True Blue	Little John	
2016	Silent Lamb	Brody Chapman	Short film
2017	No Appointment Necessary	Dr Schnell	
2018	Book Week	Brant	
2018	Schedule One	Henry	Short film
2019	Kapara	Patterson	Short film
2019	Escape and Evasion	Carl Boddi	
2019	Locusts	Cain	
2020	Torch Song	Geoff	Short film
2020	Jump	Joe	Short film
2020	June Again	Roger	
2021	Lundi	Louis	Short film
2022	Dark Noise	Ollie Martin	
2023	Christmess	Chris Flint	
2025	Penny Lane Is Dead	Merrick	

=== Television ===
Year	Title	Role	Notes
1993	Police Rescue	Youth	Season 3, 1 episode
1993–2018	Home and Away	Boyd Easton / Beggar / Kevin	9 episodes
1994	G.P.	Russ	Season 5, 1 episode
1997	Water Rats	Tim	Season 2, 1 episode
1997	Big Sky	Bill Madigan	Season 1, 1 episode
1997–1999	Wildside	Ray Collins	Seasons 1 & 2, 2 episodes
1998	A Difficult Woman	Snuff	Miniseries, 3 episodes
1999	Murder Call	David Hand	Season 3, 1 episode
1999	Blue Heelers	Tyrone McKenzie	Season 6, 1 episode
2001	South Pacific	Stewpot	TV movie
2002	Farscape	Oo-Nii	Season 4, 2 episodes
2002	Young Lions	SPG Officer Stevens	1 episode
2003	All Saints	Boyd Matthews	Season 6, 1 episode
2004	Rapid Response	Sergeant Lawson	TV pilot
2008	Dream Life	Courier	TV movie
2009	Sea Princesses	Voice	Animated series, 52 episodes
2010	Sea Patrol	Karl Strauss	Season 4, 1 episode
2010–2018	Rake	Col Mancusi	16 episodes
2011	Laid	Zalan	1 episode
2011	Small Time Gangster	Tony Piccolo	Miniseries, 8 episodes
2011	Underbelly: Razor	Sergeant Tom Wickham	13 episodes
2013	The Elegant Gentleman's Guide to Knife Fighting	Special guest	Miniseries, 2 episodes
2014	The Moodys	Donny Lannagan	Miniseries, 1 episode
2014	Old School	Gerard	Miniseries, 2 episodes
2014	Wentworth	Colin Bates	Season 2, 4 episodes
2014	Soul Mates	Gulliver	2 episodes
2015	Catching Milat	Phil Polgasse	Miniseries, 1 episode
2015	Let's Talk About	Chip	Miniseries, 8 episodes
2016	No Activity	Voice	Season 2, 3 episodes
2017	Janet King	Wes Foster	Season 3, 6 episodes
2017	Blue Murder: Killer Cop	Detective Larry Churchill	Miniseries, 1 episode
2018	Riot	Sergeant Evans	TV movie
2019	Les Norton	Sgt Ray 'Thumper' Burrell	Miniseries, 10 episodes
2021	Australia's Sexiest Tradie	Terry Wood	6 episodes
2023	The Claremont Murders	Trevor Rimmer	Miniseries, 1 episode
2024	Population 11	Trevor Taylor	9 episodes
2024	The Twelve	Mal Adcock	Season 2, 2 episodes
2025	Invisible Boys	Fitzy	1 episode
2025	Mystery Road: Origin	The Cowboy	Season 2, 2 episodes
2025	Reckless	Ross	4 episodes
2026	Deadloch	Commissioner Cotton	1 episode
2026	Treasure & Dirt	TBA	TV series

== Theatre ==
=== As actor ===
Year	Title	Role	Notes
1991	Agamemnon / Lysistrata		Seymour Centre, Sydney
1995–1996	He Died with a Felafel in His Hand		Bridge Hotel, Sydney, The Lounge, Melbourne for Melbourne International Comedy Festival
2001–2002	The Return (stage version of Last Train to Freo)	The Thug	Stables Theatre, Sydney with Griffin Theatre Company, Riverina Theatre Company, Griffin Theatre Company, Rechabite Hall, Perth
2002	Buried Child	Tilden	Belvoir Theatre, Sydney
2003	Waiting for Godot	Lucky	Belvoir Street Theatre, Sydney for Sydney Festival
2003	Songket		Sydney Opera House with Griffin Theatre Company
2003	Holy Day	Goundry	Wharf Theatre, Sydney with STC
2004–2005	The Spook	Alex / Fantasy Communist	Belvoir Street Theatre, Sydney, Glen Street Theatre, Sydney, Playhouse, Brisbane for QTC
2007	Don's Party	Don	Playhouse, Melbourne, Sydney Opera House with MTC / STC
2007	Paul		Belvoir Street Theatre, Sydney
2007	Tales from The Vienna Woods	Oskar	Sydney Opera House with STC
2007	The Serpent's Teeth	John Black	Sydney Opera House with STC
2008	Gallipoli		Sydney Theatre Company
2009	The War of the Roses	Thomas Mowbray, Duke of Norfolk / A Killer / Suffolk / A Murderer	Sydney Theatre for Sydney Festival, His Majesty's Theatre, Perth for Perth International Arts Festival with STC
2011–2012	Summer of the Seventeenth Doll	Roo Webber	Belvoir Street Theatre, Arts Centre, Melbourne, Playhouse, Brisbane with MTC / STC / QTC
2012	Death of a Salesman	Ben	Belvoir Street Theatre
2014	Ugly Mugs	Doc / Mug	Malthouse Theatre, Stables Theatre, Sydney with Griffin Theatre Company
2015	Gaybies		Eternity Playhouse, Sydney with Darlinghurst Theatre
2017	Jasper Jones	Mr Bucktin / Mad Jack Lionel	Belvoir Street Theatre, Sydney
2018	An Enemy of the People	Hovstad, Editor of The Sentinel	Belvoir Street Theatre, Sydney
2021–2022	Green Park	Warren	Griffin Theatre Company for Sydney Festival

=== As Co-adaptor ===
Year	Title	Role	Notes
1995–1996	He Died with a Felafel in His Hand	Co-adaptor (with Simon Bedak & Michael Neaylon) / director	Bridge Hotel, Sydney, The Lounge, Melbourne for Melbourne International Comedy Festival
2000–2001	He Died with a Felafel in His Hand	Co-adaptor (with Simon Bedak & Michael Neaylon)	Bridge Hotel, Sydney, Bondi Pavilion for Sydney Fringe Festival World Bar, Sydney
2002	He Died with a Felafel in His Hand	Co-adaptor (with Simon Bedak & Michael Neaylon)	Edinburgh Festival with Gilded Balloon
2003	He Died with a Felafel in His Hand	Co-adaptor (with Simon Bedak & Michael Neaylon)	Regal Theatre, Perth, Latvian House, Toronto, Parkside Lounge, New York with Hair of the Dog Theater Company
2005–2006	He Died With A Felafel In his Hand	Co-adaptor (with Simon Bedak & Michael Neaylon)	La Boite Theatre, Brisbane, DNA Studios, Canberra
2007	He Died With A Felafel In his Hand	Co-adaptor (with Simon Bedak & Michael Neaylon)	Queen's Theatrette – Queen’s Arms Hotel, Adelaide with Half a Star Theatre
2009–2010	He Died With A Felafel In his Hand	Co-adaptor (with Simon Bedak & Michael Neaylon)	Brisbane Arts Theatre, Hong Kong
2013	He Died With A Felafel In his Hand	Co-adaptor (with Simon Bedak & Michael Neaylon)	The Flying Scotsman's Velvet Lounge, Perth, Brisbane Powerhouse
