= Saskia Hampele =

Australian actress

- Born: Perth, Western Australia
- Occupation: Actress
- Years active: 1997–present
- Spouse: Kayne Tremills (2008–present)

Saskia Hampele is an Australian actress. She appeared in television series The Gift and Mark Loves Sharon, and feature films Arctic Blast and Blame. She played Georgia Brooks in Neighbours and starred in The Heights.

== Early life and education ==
Hampele was born in Perth, Western Australia. Her mother was a musician, so growing up, she had access to "every instrument under the sun". As a teenager she undertook the Teens Film & TV Program at The Australian Film and Television Academy (TAFTA) in Sydney. Hampele also attended the Perth Modern School on a music scholarship. As a teen, she appeared in television advertisements, community television and short films.

Hampele qualified as a social worker and worked as a counsellor at The Reach Foundation and the Royal Children's Hospital cancer ward, while her acting career was already underway. She has also studied health coaching at the Institute for Integrative Nutrition, in New York.

== Career ==
Hampele began her acting career in 1997, while she was in primary school, appearing in children's series The Gift and other local television productions.

In 2007, she scored a leading role in Hollywood Sign Girls, after which she moved to Melbourne to pursue her acting career. She secured the role of Beth in six-part mockumentary, Mark Loves Sharon in 2008. She then played Dr Zoe Quinn in Brian Trenchard-Smith's 2010 disaster film Arctic Blast. That same year, she appeared as Alice in thriller drama film Blame, which was shown at the Melbourne International Film Festival, the Cannes Film Festival and the Toronto International Film Festival.

2011 saw Hampele appear in a supporting role in crime drama City Homicide. She also became involved in online comedy series Shutterbugs. The series, which focuses on a photographer and her best friend trying to get the perfect shot, was showcased at the LAWebFest in Los Angeles. In 2012, Hampele starred in the film 6 Plots as Sophie Halms, which had its world premiere at the Cannes Film Festival.

On 1 August 2012, it was announced Hampele had joined the main cast of Neighbours as Georgia Brooks, the cousin of established character Toadfish Rebecchi (Ryan Moloney). She was at Kakadu National Park with her boyfriend when her agent called her about the role. She was asked to record an "impromptu" audition tape to send to the Neighbours producers, and did so in the park. She made her first appearance as Georgia in October. In 2013, Hampele recorded and released a song called "Letting You Know", which was featured in the show. She decided to leave Neighbours in early 2015, to pursue new acting roles in Los Angeles, but made a brief return to the series in 2016.

Hampele appeared in the 2017 film A Few Less Men. She also appeared in the 2019 drama series The Heights and played Laura in romantic comedy film This Little Love of Mine in 2021.

While her main focus is acting, Hampele also writes music and plays the guitar and piano, and aspires to eventually make a solo record.

== Personal life ==
Hampele is married to television presenter Kayne Tremills. She used to compete at a national level in horse vaulting.

In 2017, Hampele launched 'Gift Box', an initiative that provides homeless women with sanitary products. A crowd funding campaign raised $45,000 to start up the enterprise. In October 2017, Hampele won the Judges' Choice award at the Women of the Future Awards, for Gift Box.

Hampele was a celebrity ambassador for the 2014 Stella Fella campaign, helping to raise awareness on sex trafficking and exploitation, as well as charity movement Makeup Free Me, which helps to empower young women through positive body image messaging.

== Filmography ==
=== Film ===
Year	Title	Role	Notes
2007	Hollywood Sign Girls	Betty	Short film
2008	The Countdown	Natalie	Short film
2009	Döbereiner's Lamp	Susie	Short film
2010	Arctic Blast	Zoe Quinn	
2010	Blame	Alice	
2012	6 Plots	Sophie Halms	
2017	A Few Less Men	Angie	
2021	This Little Love of Mine	Laura	

=== Television ===
Year	Title	Role	Notes
1997	The Gift	School Girl	1 episode
2008	Mark Loves Sharon	Beth	6 episodes
2009	Welcome to the Cosmos	Amy	TV short film
2011	City Homicide	Tahnee Majors	1 episode
2011	Twentysomething	Sally	2 episodes
2012–2016	Neighbours	Georgia Brooks	376 episodes, regular role
2014	Neighbours vs Zombies	Georgia Brooks	TV special
2019	The Heights	Renee Davies	60 episodes, regular role
2024	Exposure	Faye	Miniseries, 2 episodes
