= Blame (2010 film) =

- Theatrical release poster
- Directed by: Michael Henry
- Written by: Michael Henry
- Produced by: Ryan Hodgson; Melissa Kelly; Michael Robinson
- Starring: Damian De Montemas; Sophie Lowe; Kestie Morassi; Simon Stone; Ashley Zukerman
- Cinematography: Torstein Dyrting
- Edited by: Meredith Watson Jeffrey
- Music by: Tamil Rogeon
- Production companies: 3monkeyfilms Factor 30 Films
- Release dates: 30 July 2010 (Melbourne Festival); 16 June 2011 (Australia)
- Running time: 89 minutes
- Country: Australia
- Language: English

Blame is a 2010 Australian thriller drama film starring Damian De Montemas, Sophie Lowe, Kestie Morassi, Ashley Zukerman, Simon Stone and Mark Leonard Winter. It was directed by first time feature film director, Michael Henry. The film had a limited release in Australia on 16 June 2011.

== Plot ==
A group of young vigilantes seeking revenge for a sexual betrayal fall far from grace. When the truth is out, they find themselves on the dark side of justice.

It becomes a case study in how people handle themselves in a situation that goes awry. It's an essay in the consequences of ill-considered actions and how people manage themselves in a space they're entirely ill-equipped to handle.

— Michael Henry

Music teacher Bernard (Damian De Montemas) is attacked at his home in isolated bushland by five young people masked and dressed in black. The group have just attended the funeral of Cate's (Kestie Morassi) sister Alice (Saskia Hampele), and they've come to kill Bernard, whom they blame for the girl's death as he had an affair with her when she was sixteen, and now, three years later she's taken her own life. Alice's boyfriend, Nick (Simon Stone), is the lead agitator; Alice's best friend, Natalie (Sophie Lowe), has persuaded her boyfriend, Anthony (Ashley Zukerman), to steal sleeping pills from his father's doctors surgery to make it look as though Bernard has committed suicide. It all however goes horribly wrong when their attempt fails and their victim fights for his life.

In the aftermath, questions are raised about the true nature of the events leading up to the botched attack. As lies and secrets are revealed, the dynamic of the once-tight group shifts as the friends begin to question each other's motives. As they move closer to the truth, the weight of their quest for justice drives them to a place of no return.

== Cast ==
- Damian De Montemas as Bernard
- Sophie Lowe as Natalie
- Kestie Morassi as Cate
- Ashley Zukerman as Anthony
- Simon Stone as Nick
- Mark Leonard Winter as John
- Saskia Hampele as Alice

== Reception ==
On review aggregator Rotten Tomatoes, the film holds an approval rating of 58% based on 12 reviews, with an average rating of 5.47/10. The film was screened and received accolades at Cannes Cinephiles, Melbourne International Film Festival, the 35th Toronto International Film Festival, the 47th Chicago International Film Festival, the Dublin International Film Festival and Buenos Aires International Film Festival of Independent Cinema.

=== Accolades ===
Award	Category	Subject	Result
ASE Award	Best Editing in a Feature Film	Meredith Watson Jeffrey	Nominated
Chicago International Film Festival	Honorable Mention - International Film Poster Competition	The Penguin Empire	Won
Fancine Film Festival	Best Film Youth Jury	Michael Henry	Won
Fancine Film Festival	Best Film Youth Jury	Ryan Hodgson	Won
Fancine Film Festival	Best Film Youth Jury	Melissa Kelly	Won
Fancine Film Festival	Best Film Youth Jury	Michael Ormond Robinson	Won
West Australian Screen Awards	Best Drama Production	Ryan Hodgson	Nominated
West Australian Screen Awards	Best Drama Production	Melissa Kelly	Nominated
West Australian Screen Awards	Best Drama Production	Michael Ormond Robinson	Nominated
West Australian Screen Awards	Best Cinematography	Torstein Dyrting	Won
West Australian Screen Awards	Best Editing	Meredith Watson Jeffrey	Nominated

== Filming locations ==
Filming occurred in the outer southeastern Perth suburb of Roleystone.
