= Uninhabited (film) =

- Theatrical film poster
- Directed by: Bill Bennett
- Written by: Bill Bennett
- Produced by: Bill Bennett; Silvana Milat; Paul Quin
- Starring: Geraldine Hakewill; Henry James
- Cinematography: Lachlan Milne
- Edited by: Jason Ballantine
- Music by: Peter Miller
- Release date: 14 May 2010 (Cannes)
- Running time: 93 minutes
- Country: Australia
- Language: English

Uninhabited is a 2010 Australian horror film directed by Bill Bennett and starring Geraldine Hakewill and Henry James. The film premiered at the 2010 Cannes Film Festival and in Australia during the 2010 Melbourne International Film Festival. It tells the story of a young couple vacationing at a deserted island, later discovering it has a disturbing history.

== Plot ==
Marine biology students Beth and Harry are a young couple seeking a distinctive holiday trip, and they spend ten days on a deserted and idyllic coral island on the Great Barrier Reef in Australia, recording many of their adventures with a camcorder. The first two days manifest that they are not alone and the island has a disturbing history. Haunted by a presence, they find an abandoned grave next to an old shack, the latter which has an old drawing and seven tally marks inside on the wall. When Beth and Harry sift through their camera, they discover they were filmed sleeping. Alarmed, Beth wants to leave, but Harry intends to stay, believing kids are playing pranks. They sight fishermen on a boat with guns and later realize that the grave has been remodeled, now decorated with red coral, with a wooden cross embedded at the head of the grave that reads "Coral" on it.

The following day, Beth and Harry find severed sea cucumbers (trepang) hanging from a nearby line. By this episode, they realize they are in trouble and their phone, which they plan to use to call for rescue, goes missing. Searching for the phone, they come across Spiro (Billy Milionis) and Elias (Terry Siourounis), the two lunatic Greek fishermen they had seen the day before. This leads to Beth and Harry being tied up after snooping around their space and boat, accusing them of stealing their phone. Beth is sexually molested, but something disturbs the fishermen and after one of them is injured they flee from the island on their boat, and Harry and Beth manage to free themselves.

The next day, Beth reads an old journal left behind in the shack. She learns the ghost is a girl named Coral (Tasia Zalar), a young island girl who worked for a company, harvesting sea cucumbers in the 1920s. Treading on a venomous stone fish, she became an object of ridicule and was raped by seven men from the company. Ever since her death, her soul seeks indiscriminate vengeance against all men who visit the island. Beth is wrapped up in the story that Harry initially believes to be a hoax, and Beth admits she would do the same as Coral if she was the victim. Realizing they're in grave danger, the next day they plan to create a bonfire in the hopes a rescue team finds them. However, a ringing phone brings Harry alone to the shack and he encounters Coral, who kills him with a knife and hangs his naked body in a tree above her grave. As night falls, Beth finds his hanging corpse dripping blood onto the grave and faints.

The next morning, Beth recovers to find all trace of Harry's body gone—but one of the graves near the campsite has been filled in. While lighting the bonfire, she sees Coral standing on the reef. She runs in the water towards her, only to step on a stone fish, sending the painful venom running through her legs, as she manages to return to shore before succumbing to the venom. On the tenth day, Jackson comes back to pick up the couple he dropped off, but no one is seen. He goes to enter the shack finding the journal resting on a chair. A menacing Beth confronts and presumably kills him. One of the final scenes show Beth's grave next to Coral's, appearing as if they joined forces.

== Cast ==
- Geraldine Hakewill as Beth
- Henry James as Harry
- Tasia Zalar as Coral
- Bob Baines as Jackson
- Billy Milionis as Spiro
- Terry Siourounis as Elias

== Production ==
The film was based on ten days Bill Bennett spent on North West Island, about 100km off the Capricorn Coast, with his brother in the 1970s.

Uninhabited was filmed on location on Masthead Island, Great Barrier Reef, Queensland, Australia.

Most of the music was performed by the band The Truth Is.

== Reception ==
Kwenton Bellette of Twitch Film wrote, "Uninhabited was oftentimes boring, offered no real scares, the only mouth open scenes were yawn inducing, and no satisfying conclusion." Corey Danna of HorrorNews.Net wrote, "[Bennett's] talent shines through when showing off the island, but the story is just not that interesting or original."

Screen Anarchy wrote "it feels at times like a student production. It does nothing to redefine the genre; it has no new tricks, just tired, overused ones."

Based on a review from Horror News: "There is so much that could have been done with the film that wasn’t. Veteran director Bill Bennett should have been able to deliver a much more entertaining film. His talent shines through when showing off the island, but the story is just not that interesting or unoriginal. I wish I had more positive things to say about the film but the truth is, I don’t. I didn’t like it nor would I ever watch it again. I give “Uninhabited” ** out of five stars."
