= Tom Wren (actor) =

Australian actor

- Occupation: Actor
- Notable work: Winners & Losers; Harry Potter and the Cursed Child

Tom Wren is an Australian actor. He was nominated the 2012 Logie Award for Most Popular New Male Talent for his role in Winners & Losers.

Screen roles he has played includes the TV series Winners & Losers as Doug Graham for four seasons, the final telemovie episode of The Doctor Blake Mysteries as Martin Carver, and the 2020 film Disclosure as Joel Chambers.

From February 2019 to March 2022 he played Draco Malfoy in the Melbourne production of Harry Potter and the Cursed Child, leaving when the shows format changed to a one part show, moving on to Mary Poppins playing George Banks. From 2025 he played Charles in Beetlejuice The Musical until it was canceled, finising 5 July 2026. Earlier stage roles include The Suicide (2010, Belvoir St Downstairs Theatre), The Only Child (2009, Belvoir St Downstairs Theatre), and Othello (2007, Bell Shakespeare Company).
