= Akoni =

2021 film

- Directed by: Genna Chanelle Hayes
- Written by: Genna Chanelle Hayes
- Produced by: Genna Chanelle Hayes
- Starring: Kit Esuruoso; Genna Chanelle Hayes
- Cinematography: Calum Stewart
- Edited by: Rodrigo Balart
- Music by: Maria Alfonsine
- Release date: 2021
- Running time: 94 minutes
- Country: Australia
- Language: English

Akoni is a 2021 Australian romantic drama film created by Genna Chanelle Hayes and starring Kit Esuruoso and Chanelle Hayes. It was filmed in Sydney and Ghana with production in Australia, Ghana, Nigeria and the United Kingdom. It was created to raise awareness of the impact Boko Haram was having in West Africa. It debuted in Augusta as part of CinefestOz Film Festival in August 2021. It got a cinema release in June 2022 for Refugee Week.

== Cast ==
- Kit Esuruoso as Akoni
- Genna Chanelle Hayes as Violet
- Mark Coles Smith as Sammy
- Jemima Osunde
- Ophelia Dzidzornu as Tujuka
- Pippa Grandison
- Rashidi Edward
- Simon Elrahi
- Christopher Stollery

== Reception ==
Rebecca Wu in Glam Adelaide gave it 5 stars and wrote "Appealing to a wide audience, Akoni’s powerful message is subtly delivered by the plot, starring two lead characters from opposite worlds, yet with strong character development that portrays just how alike they are." In Sydney Arts Guide Richard Cotter says "Without shying away from the negative truths of Australian society, AKONI aims to pursue the positives, with violence and provocation, although pivotal plot points, overshadowed by benevolence and healing. Hayes’ writing is spare, her sense of mise en scene a strong suit in let the picture tell the story."

== Awards ==
- 12th AACTA Awards
  - Best Indie Film - Akoni (Genna Chanelle Hayes) - nominated
- 2022 ARIA Music Awards
  - Best Original Soundtrack, Cast or Show Album - Maria Alfonsine with Itunu Pepper, Akoni (Original Motion Picture Soundtrack) - nominated
- Australian Screen Industry Network Awards
  - Best Actor for Kit Esuruoso - won
  - Best Supporting Actor for Mark Coles Smith - won
  - Best Feature Film - Special Distinction
