= Mark Leonard Winter =

Australian actor (born 1983)

- Occupation: Actor
- Years active: 2006–present
- Spouse: Geraldine Hakewill (m. 2021)

Mark Leonard Winter (born 11 March 1983) is an Australian actor, known for performances in film, television and on stage.

== Early life ==
Winter's family moved from Australia to Washington DC, United States, when he was in grade ten. It was the freedom of his American school and new friends, that he credits with passion for the arts and creative thinking. He states that he started to think a bit too creatively, so his parents sent him back to Australia to attend boarding school where he fell in love with English literature and theatre.

Winter spent a year studying at Flinders University in Adelaide, South Australia, and then went on to study acting at Victorian College of Arts.

== Career ==
=== Screen ===
Winter's film roles include Balibo (2009), Blame (2010), Dangerous Remedy (2012), Healing (2014), One Eyed Girl (2015), The Dressmaker alongside Kate Winslet, and Little Tornadoes (2020). He starred in the 2020 thriller film Escape from Pretoria.

In the TV series Pine Gap (2018) Winter played a technical geek on the autism spectrum, Moses Dreyfus. Winter was nominated for an AACTA Award for his performance in 2020's TV mini-series, Halifax: Retribution. Following that, Winter played Callum on the TV mini-series Inside, then Russell in the TV series The Newsreader in 2021. In 2021 he also played Joel Welch, a methadone addict in episode 3 of the ABC TV series Fires.

=== Stage ===
On stage, Winter has performed major roles with leading Australian theatre companies, including the Sydney Theatre Company and the Melbourne Theatre Company. He was one of the founding members of Black Lung, an independent theatre company. In 2015, Winter starred in the Melbourne Theatre Company's production of Simon Stephens' Birdland, for which he won the award for Best Male Actor at the Helpmann Awards.

Winter directed Seinfeld actor Jason Alexander in an American production of The Blind Date Project, a type of improv which he helped devise.

=== Directing ===
Winter's first film as writer-director, The Rooster, is a comedy drama starring Hugo Weaving, which premiered at the Melbourne International Film Festival in August 2023. The film was selected as one of four nominees for the CinefestOZ Film Prize, worth A$100,000, in September 2023, and was also nominated for the 2023 AACTA Award for Best Indie Film.

It was released in Australian cinemas on 22 February 2024.

== Filmography ==
=== Film ===
Year	Title	Role	Notes
2006	Rush	Liam Rainey	Short film
2007	Advantage Satan		Short film
2008	Playing for Charlie	Scarf	
2008	Hell's Gates	Alexander Dalton	Short film
2009	Van Diemen's Land	Alexander Dalton	
2009	Balibo	Tony Stewart	
2009	Covered	Matt	Short film
2009	Further We Search	Damien	
2010	Blame	John	
2010	Arietta		Short film
2010	Yasue	Steven	Short film
2011	Phone Call	Jack	Short film
2012	Green Eyed	Lloyd	Short film
2013	The Boy Castaways	Michael	
2013	One Eyed Girl	Travis	
2014	Healing	Shane Harrison	
2014	There Is No Such Thing as a Jellyfish	Boyfriend	Short film
2015	The Fear of Darkness	Matt Sorensen	
2015	The Dressmaker	Reginald Blood	
2016	Halfbeard	Barber	Short film
2017	Tomorrow, and Tomorrow, and Tomorrow	Helmut	Short film
2018	The True History of Billie the Kid	Jimbo	Short film
2019	Measure for Measure	Angelo	
2020	Disclosure	Danny Bowman	
2020	Escape from Pretoria	Leonard Fontaine	
2021	Tough	Shane	Short film
2021	Little Tornadoes	Leo	
2022	Elvis	Tom Hulett	

==== As writer / director ====
Year	Title	Role	Notes
2023	The Rooster (film)	Writer / Director	

=== Television ===
Year	Title	Role	Notes
2010	The Pacific	Relief Cook	Miniseries, episode 2: "Basilone"
2011	Killing Time	Colin	Miniseries, episode 5
2011	Cop Hard	Detective Larry Hard	13 episodes
2011	Winners & Losers	James 'JB' Bartlett	Season 1, 8 episodes
2011	Rush	Liam Rainey	Season 4, 3 episodes
2012	Dangerous Remedy	Lionel Pugh	TV movie
2013	Miss Fisher's Murder Mysteries	Aubrey Wilde	Season 2, episode 5: "Murder à la Mode"
2014	The Greatest Love of All	John	Miniseries, 6 episodes
2015	Fresh Blood Pilot Season	Teddy	Season 1, episode 5: "Bedhead"
2017	Top of the Lake	Johnno	Season 2, episode 2: "The Loved One"
2017	Cleverman	Bill Hendricks	Season 2, 5 episodes
2018	Pine Gap	Moses Dreyfus	Miniseries, 6 episodes
2020	Halifax: Retribution	Duncan	Miniseries, episode 2
2020	Inside	Callum	Miniseries, episode 5
2021	Eden	Damien	Miniseries, 4 episodes
2021	The Newsreader	Russell	Season 1, episode 5: "No More Lies"
2021	Fires	Joel Welch	Miniseries, 2 episodes
2025	The Family Next Door	Peter	TV series: 3 episodes

==== As writer / director ====
Year	Title	Role	Notes
2014	The Greatest Love of All	Writer / Director	Miniseries, 6 episodes

== Stage ==
=== As cast ===
Year	Title	Role	Notes
2006; 2007	Kissy Kissy		The Black Lung Theatre, Melbourne
2006	A Kind of Hush		Cinema Nova, Melbourne
2006	The Winter's Tale		The Eleventh Hour Theatre, Melbourne
2007	A Ramble Through the Wooded Glen		Fairfax Studio, Melbourne with Black Lung for Short+Sweet
2008	The Tragedy of Hamlet Prince of Denmark		Tower Theatre, Melbourne with Malthouse Theatre & Poor Theatre
2008	The Soldier's Tale		Sacred Heart Chapel, Melbourne with Orchestra Project & The Hayloft Project
2008	Avast	The Preacher	Tower Theatre, Melbourne with Malthouse Theatre & Black Lung
2008	Avast II: The Welshman Cometh	The Preacher	Tower Theatre, Melbourne with Malthouse Theatre & Black Lung
2010; 2015	Thyestes	Atreus	Tower Theatre, Melbourne, CarriageWorks, Sydney, Théâtre Nanterre-Amandiers, France with Belvoir, Malthouse Theatre & The Hayloft Project
2014	The Effect	Tristan	Bille Brown Studio, Brisbane with QTC & STC
2015	Suddenly Last Summer	Doctor Cukrowicz	Sydney Opera House with STC
2015	Birdland	Paul	Southbank Theatre, Melbourne with MTC
2015	King Lear	Edgar	STC
2016	Miss Julie	Jean	Southbank Theatre, Melbourne with MTC
2017	Chimerica	Joe Schofield	Roslyn Packer Theatre, Sydney with STC
2017	Three Sisters	Vershinin	Sydney Opera House with STC
2023	The Master and Margarita	The Master / Ensemble	Belvoir Street Theatre, Sydney
2024	A Streetcar Named Desire	Stanley Kowalski	MTC

=== As crew ===
Year	Title	Role	Notes
2007; 2008	Spring Awakening	Designer	Fortyfivedownstairs, Melbourne, Belvoir Street Theatre, Sydney with The Hayloft Project
2008	Avast	Devisor	Tower Theatre, Melbourne with Malthouse Theatre & Black Lung
2008	Avast II: The Welshman Cometh	Devisor	Tower Theatre, Melbourne with Malthouse Theatre & Black Lung
2009	3xSisters	Director	Arts House Meat Market, Melbourne with The Hayloft Project
2010; 2015	Thyestes	Writer	Tower Theatre, Melbourne, CarriageWorks, Sydney, Théâtre Nanterre-Amandiers, France with Belvoir, Malthouse Theatre & The Hayloft Project
2013; 2021	The Blind Date Project	Director / Creator	The Karaoke Klub, Sydney, Artspace, Adelaide with Ride On Theatre

== Recognition and awards ==
Year	Work	Award	Category	Result
2009	3 x Sisters (The Hayloft Project)	Green Room Award	Best Show	Nominated
2010	Thyestes	Green Room Awards	Best Production	Won
2010	Thyestes	Green Room Awards	Best Adaption	Won
2010	Thyestes	Green Room Awards	Best Ensemble	Won
2010	Thyestes	Green Room Awards	Best Actor	Nominated
2012	Thyestes	Sydney Theatre Awards	Best New Australian Work	Nominated
2012	Thyestes	Sydney Theatre Awards	Best Leading Actor	Nominated
2014	One Eyed Girl	21st Annual Austin Film Festival: Dark Matters	Jury Award	Won
2015	One Eyed Girl	Madrid International Film Festival Award	Best Lead Actor	Nominated
2015	Birdland	Green Room Award	Best Male Actor	Nominated
2016	King Lear	Helpmann Award	Best Male Supporting Actor	Won
2016	Birdland	Helpmann Award	Best Male Actor	Won
2017	Miss Julie	Green Room Award	Best Male Actor	Nominated
2017	Mark Leonard Winter	Sidney Myer Creative Fellowship	Recognising Outstanding Talent for mid-career artists	Honoured
2023	The Rooster	CinefestOZ	Film Prize	Nominated
2023	The Rooster	AACTA Award	Best Indie Film	Nominated

== Personal life ==
Winter is married to actress and singer, Geraldine Hakewill. They first met in 2011, occasionally crossing paths until they became a couple in 2017, and married in December 2021. They have co-starred in the 2020 psychodrama Disclosure.

Winter is a big fan of movies from the 1970s, and the work of Robert De Niro and Daniel Day-Lewis.

In November 2018, Winter gave evidence against his co-star in King Lear, Geoffrey Rush, in Rush's defamation lawsuit against the Daily Telegraph.
