= Sarrah Le Marquand =

Australian journalist and media commentator

Sarrah Le Marquand is an Australian journalist and media commentator. She is Head of Entertainment, Audio and News360 and was formerly the founding editor-in-chief of Stellar, a weekly magazine available in the News Corp Australia Sunday newspapers. The current Stellar Content Director is Nicholas Fonseca. Le Marquand hosts the celebrity interview podcast Something To Talk About and is a former regular co-host on television show The Project on Network 10 and regular panellist for Today on Nine Network. She has appeared as a commentator on Sky News Australia, Q&A, The Drum, A Current Affair, The Morning Show, Sunrise and ABC Local Radio.

== Early life ==
Le Marquand was born in Sydney. She graduated from co-educational school Oakhill College, in Castle Hill. Her older brother, Steve Le Marquand, also attended Oakhill College Castle Hill, and is a film and stage actor. Le Marquand studied at the University of Sydney and graduated with an honours degree in Government in 2000.

== Career ==
Early on in her career, Le Marquand worked as a magazine entertainment reporter at Pacific Magazines and was the regular film critic on Sunrise before joining The Daily Telegraph in 2005 as a television writer.

In 2008 she was appointed features editor of The Daily Telegraph and in 2014 she was appointed opinion editor. In 2015 she became the founding editor of RendezView, the opinion column for News Corp Australia.

Le Marquand's opinion columns have attracted publicity for her often controversial stance on issues such as feminism, gender equality and parenting.

After making her first television appearance on Sunrise as a film reviewer in 2002, a guest appearance that turned into a regular role for three years, Le Marquand returned to the breakfast show in 2010 as a weekly panellist on Kochie's Angels. In 2014 she joined Today as a weekly panellist and in 2016 become a regular co-host of The Project.

In August 2016 Le Marquand launched the magazine Stellar, overseeing its re-branding from Sunday Style. The magazine has attracted attention both in Australia and internationally for cover interviews with Nicole Kidman, Katy Perry, Janet Jackson, Karl Stefanovic, Jessica Simpson, Bindi Irwin, Lisa Wilkinson and Jennifer Hawkins.

In 2017 she was singled out for favourable mention on the television show Media Watch for having the “last laugh” in a panel discussion on Today about conspiracy theories of Melania Trump allegedly hiring a body double.

In September 2019 Le Marquand announced Stellar would no longer ask female celebrities being profiled in the magazine about their family plans. She stated that, “for a lot of people that are secretly struggling with pregnancy loss or having fertility issues, it's actually a question that really cuts them to the core. We felt as a magazine that we didn't want to be playing that role anymore."

In 2021 she was announced as the first ever ambassador for Women's Community Shelters, an Australian charity providing crisis accommodation for women and children experiencing domestic violence.

== Personal life ==
Le Marquand lives in Sydney with her two sons.
