= The Rooster (film) =

2023 Australian film

- Film poster
- Directed by: Mark Leonard Winter
- Written by: Mark Leonard Winter
- Produced by: MahVeen Shahraki; Geraldine Hakewill
- Starring: Hugo Weaving; Phoenix Raei; John Waters
- Cinematography: Craig Barden
- Edited by: Cameron Ford
- Music by: Stefan Gregory
- Distributed by: Bonsai Films (Australia & New Zealand); The Yellow Affair (international)
- Release date: 5 August 2023
- Running time: 1h 41m
- Country: Australia

The Rooster is a 2023 Australian comedy drama film directed by Mark Leonard Winter and starring Hugo Weaving, Phoenix Raei, and John Waters.

== Synopsis ==
Dan is a lonely country policeman in regional Victoria, Australia, who spends his mornings feeding his angry rooster. His mental state appears to be fragile, especially after a childhood friend, Steve, is found dead in the forest, and his rooster is killed by a fox. He takes time off work and explores the bush, where he encounters The Hermit living in a hut in the forest. The rest of the film revolves around the relationship between the two men.

== Cast ==
- Phoenix Raei as Dan
- John Waters as Norris
- Hugo Weaving as The Hermit
- Rhys Mitchell as Steve
- Robert Menzies as Mr Poulson
- Deidre Rubenstein as Mrs Poulson
- Tom Stokes as Detective Grant
- Jane Montgomery Griffiths as Detective Logan
- Natasha Herbert as Netball mum
- Quinn Le Fevre as Young Steve
- Helen Thomson as Lorraine

== Production ==
The Rooster is the debut feature film written and directed by actor Mark Leonard Winter. Weaving said that he wanted to act in a film that looked at men's mental health, partly sparked by the suicide of actor Damian Hill in 2018, who was a friend of Winter.

It was filmed in the forests around Daylesford, Victoria, near Winter's home in Glenlyon.

The film was produced by Geraldine Hakewill and MahVeen Shahraki and production companies Don't Crow! and Thousand Mile Productions. It was partly financed by the Melbourne International Film Festival (MIFF) Premiere Fund, but was made on a very small budget, partly out of the home of director Winter.

The film score was composed by Stefan Gregory; Craig Barden was director of photography, and Cameron Ford was editor.

== Release ==
The Rooster had its world premiere at the Melbourne International Film Festival on 5 August 2023. It was also selected for screening at the Santa Barbara International Film Festival in California, U.S.

It was released in Australian cinemas on 22 February 2024. The film is distributed by Bonsai Films in Australia and New Zealand, and by The Yellow Affair internationally.

== Reception ==
Luke Buckmaster of The Guardian gave it three out of five stars, praising Raei's performance and concluding "As a 'Hugo Weaving goes feral in the bush' movie, The Rooster delivers. As an exploration of masculinity and a drama about two men connecting, it's decent but unexceptional".

Film studies lecturer Stuart Richards wrote in an article for The Conversation: "For the most part... the balance of comedy and drama works", "The dynamics between both characters allows Raei and Weaving to excel in their performances", and "The Rooster may be a small character study of two fragile men, but it’s a powerful examination of isolation and moving on". In a review for ScreenHub, Russell gave the film four out of five stars, calling it a "startling debut".

Peter Gray at The AU Review gave it three and a half stars, writing "both Raei and Weaving play off each other with an unpredictable energy".

=== Awards and nominations ===
The Rooster was selected as one of four nominees for the CinefestOZ Film Prize, worth A$100,000, in September 2023.

It was nominated for the Bright Horizons Award in the MIFF Awards.

Winter won best director in the Australian Directors' Guild Awards, with the judges calling it "an astonishing debut film that deeply affected judges with the depth and complexity of its character development and provided a vehicle for what may be Weaving’s most powerful performance to date".

In the 13th edition of the AACTA Awards, presented in February 2024 for films released in 2023, The Rooster was nominated for the AACTA Award for Best Indie Film. Hugo Weaving won Best Supporting Actor, Phoenix Raei was nominated for Best Lead Actor, and Ellen Stanistreet was nominated for Best Costume Design.
