= Lost Things =

- Directed by: Martin Murphy
- Written by: Stephen Sewell
- Produced by: Ian Iveson
- Starring: Leon Ford; Alexandra Vaughan; Lenka Kripac; Charlie Garber; Steve Le Marquand
- Cinematography: Justine Kerrigan
- Music by: Carlo Giacco
- Release date: 2004
- Running time: 90 mins
- Country: Australia
- Language: English
- Box office: A$20,899 (Australia)

Lost Things is a 2004 Australian suspense film about four friends who go away to the beach for the weekend.

== Plot ==
Four teenagers Emily, Gary, Brad and Tracey, set off for a surfing weekend north of Sydney. But when they arrive at the deserted beach, Emily begins to sense that there is something strange about the place...and soon they all discover that they are not alone.

== Cast ==
- Lenka Kripac as Emily
- Leon Ford as Gary
- Charlie Garber as Brad
- Alex Vaughan as Tracey
- Steve Le Marquand as Zippo

== Production ==
It was shot over 11 days. It was made without government assistance although received support from Showtime.

== Critical reception ==
The Sydney Morning Herald noted that "Lost Things is a clever, credible, low-budget experiment without being an entirely clever, credible film."
