= Damian de Montemas =

Australian actor

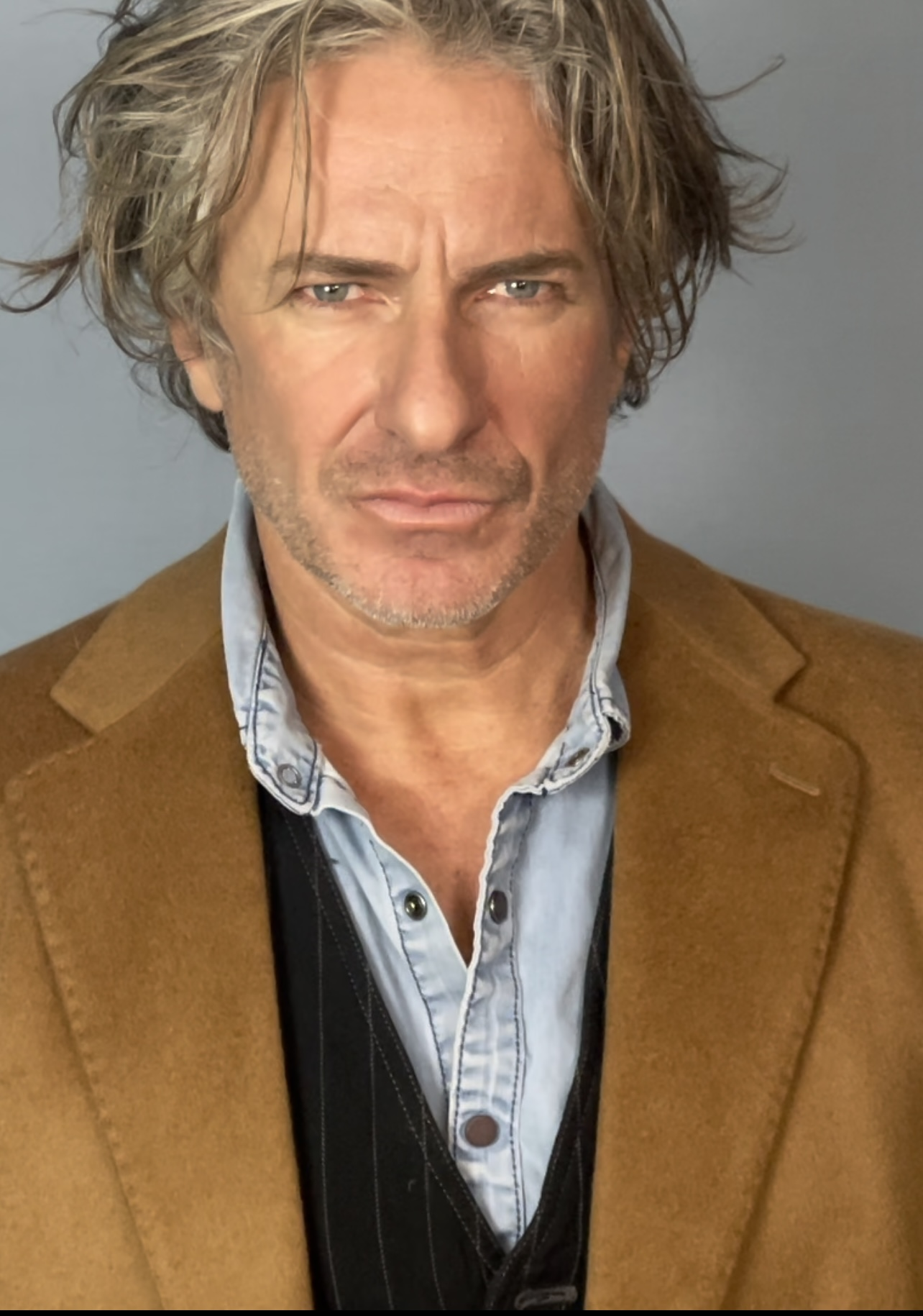
- Education: Western Australian Academy of Performing Arts
- Occupation: Actor

Damian de Montemas is an Australian film, television and stage actor. He had a breakthrough role as Jason Kennedy, in the first two seasons of Melbourne drama series, Secret Life of Us (2001-2002).

He later had a regular role on the soap opera Home and Away playing Henk van Patten (2007-2008). In 2009, he won the AFI Award for Best Guest or Supporting Actor in a Television Drama for Underbelly (2009).

== Career ==
Damian de Montemas attended and graduated from Western Australian Academy of Performing Arts (WAAPA).

Damian de Montemas portrayed Jason Kennedy in the first two series of The Secret Life Of Us, and Brian Alexander on Underbelly: A Tale of Two Cities, the latter for which he won the 2009 AFI Award for Best Supporting Actor in a miniseries.

He made appearances in All Saints, Blue Heelers and appeared as Henk Van Minnen on Home and Away. In 2013, de Montemas joined the cast of Neighbours in the guest role of Alek Pocoli. He made his first screen appearance on 9 September.

In June 2024, de Montemas was named for the second series of Stan drama Scrublands.

== Filmography ==
=== Film ===
Year	Title	Role	Type
1999	Chameleon II: Death Match	Lenz	TV film
1999	In the Red (aka Redlined)	Zed	Feature film
2001	My Husband, My Killer	David Christie	TV film
2002	The Visitor	Luke	Short film
2003	The Cherry Orchard	Older Antoine	Short film
2004	Somersault	Adam	Feature film
2005	Tom-Yum-Goong (aka The Protector)	Inspector Vincent	Feature film
2006	Hold Please	Jane’s ex	Short film
2006	The Silence	Michael Hanlon	TV film
2007	Soul Mates	Lenny	Short film
2007	Joanne Lees: Murder in the Outback	PC Bantan	TV film
2007	The Final Winter	Max	Feature film
2008	Every Other Weekend	Roger	Short film
2010	Blame	Bernard	Feature film
2012	Jack Irish: Black Tide	Transquik Security Guard	TV film
2012	Scratch	Mark	Short film
2012	The Housewife	Xander	Short film
2013	Trapped	Jim	Short film
2014	Carlotta	Lance	TV film
2014	Locks of Love	Dale	Feature film
2016	Antwood	Jon	Short film
2016	Hounds of Love	Trevor Maloney	Feature film
2019	Sequin in a Blue Room	D	Feature film
2020	Go Karts (aka Go!)	Mike Zeta	Feature film
2023	Transfusion	Tony McManus	Feature film

=== Television ===
Year	Title	Role	Type
1995	Police Rescue	Greg	TV series, 1 episode
1998-99	Minty	Shane Conner	TV series, 12 episodes
1998-2009	All Saints	Jules Wilson, Mike McGrath, Scott McFarlane	TV series, 3 episodes
1999	Farscape	Melkor	TV series, Episode: Exodus from Genesis
1999	Big Sky	Spike	TV series, 1 episode
1999	Water Rats	Constable ‘Fish’ Wilson	TV series, 1 episode
2000	Pizza		TV series, 1 episode
2000	Murder Call	Shane De Bono	TV series. 1 episode
2001	Blue Heelers	Guy Merrin	TV series, 1 episode
2001-02	The Secret Life Of Us	Jason Kennedy	TV series, Seasons 1–2, Episodes 1-44
2001-02	Crash Palace	Luc	TV series, 55 episodes
2002	Stingers	Greg Smith	TV series, 1 episode
2006-08	Home and Away	Henk Van Patten	TV series, 108 episodes
2009	East West 101	Zimmer	TV series, 1 episode
2009	Underbelly: A Tale of Two Cities	Brian Alexander	TV series, 9 episodes
2010	Rescue Special Ops	Jim Tucker	TV series, 1 episode
2010	Cops LAC	Matt Hilton	TV series, 13 episodes
2011	Crownies	Alistair Hoy	TV series, 1 episode
2011	Wild Boys	Clem Roley	TV series, 1 episode
2013	Packed to the Rafters	Justin	TV series, 1 episode
2013	Neighbours	Alek Pocoli	TV series, 2 episodes
2015	Ready for This	Coach Domaleski	TV series, 5 episodes
2016	Wolf Creek	Inspector Darwin / Duty Inspector Dave	TV series, 4 episodes
2016	Hyde and Seek	Mr Hanley	Miniseries, 2 episodes
2018	Patricia Moore	Mr Kovak	TV series, 1 episode
2018	Rake	Agent Carol	TV series, 1 episode
2019	Blue Water Empire	Lieutenant	Miniseries
2019	The Commons	Barney	Miniseries, 2 episodes
2025	Scrublands: Silver	Tyson St Clair	TV series:4 episodes
