= Geraldine Hakewill =

Australian actress (born 1987)

- Born: 13 July 1987 (age 39); Paris, France
- Occupations: Actress; singer
- Years active: 2008–present
- Known for: Wanted; Ms Fisher's Modern Murder Mysteries
- Spouse: Mark Leonard Winter (m. 2021)

Geraldine Hakewill (born 13 July 1987) is an Australian actress and singer. She acted as Chelsea Babbage in the Australian TV series Wanted for three seasons from 2016 to 2018 and Peregrine Fisher, the titular character in Ms Fisher's Modern Murder Mysteries for two seasons from 2019 to 2021.

== Early life and education ==
Hakewill was born on 13 July 1987 in Paris, France, where her parents were living while her father, Peter Hakewill, a general practitioner, was working in tropical disease management. At nine months old, her family moved to Geneva, Switzerland, and then to Chennai in south India, where they practised meditation in an ashram. Her mother Elizabeth later taught meditation. Hakewill grew up in Sydney from age four with a younger brother, Lucas. In March 1994, her father set up an Australian agency for Médecins Sans Frontières (Doctors Without Borders) to attract local doctors. When Hakewill was 14 years old her parents divorced. Her father remarried, and she has two step-siblings and two half-siblings.

Hakewill graduated from the Western Australian Academy of Performing Arts.

== Career ==
=== Acting ===
She played Beth in the 2010 Australian film Uninhabited directed by Bill Bennett, and played Ella in 2011 Australian thriller Wasted on the Young. In August to September of that year she took the role of Tiny in the theatre play, Sweet Bird andsoforth at ATYP Studio. She has appeared in productions for the Sydney Theatre Company, Belvoir St Theatre and Bell Shakespeare Company. Also in 2011, she played Angela in a production of the play Heaven by Kit Brookman, performed at the Old 505 Theatre in Surry Hills, Sydney.

Hakewill secured the starring role of Chelsea Babbage in all three seasons of TV thriller, Wanted (2016–2018) for which she received a TV Week Logie Award nomination for Most Outstanding Newcomer in 2017. From 2019 she starred in Ms Fisher's Modern Murder Mysteries a spin-off of Miss Fisher's Murder Mysteries (2012–2015) TV series, which was based on Kerry Greenwood's novels. She took the lead and titular character of Peregrine Fisher for two seasons (2019, 2021). She was hoping for a third season, however as of October 2022 there has been no confirmation from its broadcaster Seven Network.

In 2019 Hakewill also had a recurring role as prison inmate Kylee Webb on the seventh season of Wentworth. At the Darlinghurst Theatre Company in that year, she played the shy character of Laura in the play The Rise and Fall of Little Voice, where she also showcased her vocal talents.

In 2021, she played Dr. Kareena Wells in ABC's eight-part psych ward drama, Wakefield. Filming had begun but bush fires during 2019/2020 pushed the production to the Southern Highlands of New South Wales, which then were also affected by fires. In March 2020 the COVID-19 pandemic shut down shooting for five months, and the cast were able to secure the government JobKeeper payments during the hiatus.

In 2024, Hakewill guest starred in the Bluey episode Surprise!, providing Bluey Heeler's adult voice in the ending.

On 10 June 2025, Hakewill was named for ABC animated series Tales From Outer Suburbia.

=== Music ===
In Wanted season 2 episode 2 Hakewill, in character, sang her rendition of "Angel" originally by Sarah McLachlan. Under the moniker Geri, the artist's music career spans folk and jazz. She is inspired by musicians, Karen O and Feist. Her self-written four-track extended play (EP) You've Never Seen This Smile, was released on 28 March 2018. An EP track, "Healing" was used in the final episodes of Wanted season 3 in October of that year.

== Personal life ==
Hakewill met fellow actor Mark Leonard Winter in 2011. They become engaged in 2017, and married in December 2021. She co-starred with Winter in the 2020 film Disclosure.

Hakewill has revealed her anxiety, which she ameliorates by meditation. She is a friend of fashion designer Bianca Spender.

== Filmography ==
=== Film ===
Year	Title	Role	Notes	Ref
2010	Uninhabited	Beth	Main role	
2011	Wasted on the Young	Ella		
2014	Ad Nauseam	April		
2017	The Pretend One	Charlie		
2018	Flotsam Jetsam	Jasmine		
2020	Disclosure	Bek Chalmers		
2023	The Rooster	N/A (Producer)		
2026	Runner	Monica		
TBA	Fertile Ground †	N/A (Director, screenwriter)	Short film, based on a short story by Else Fitzgerald; principal photography carried out from February to March 2025	

=== Television ===
Year	Title	Role	Notes	Ref
2010	Rescue: Special Ops	Shona Lankford	Season 2, 1 episode	
2013	Camp	Kendra Huffington	Season 1, 2 episodes	
2015	Australia: The Story of Us	Bridget Hayes	Season 1, 1 episode	
2016	Soul Mates	Miss Murphy	Season 2, 4 episodes	
2017	Here Come the Habibs!	Sally	Season 2, 1 episode	
2017	Pulse	Connie	Season 1, 1 episode	
2018	Wanted	Chelsea Babbage	Seasons 1-3, 18 episodes	
2019	Wentworth	Kylee Webb	Season 7, 1 episode	
2019–21	Ms Fisher's Modern Murder Mysteries	Peregrine Fisher	Seasons 1-2, 12 episodes	
2021	Wakefield	Dr. Kareena Wells	TV miniseries, 8 episodes	
2022	Boy & Bear State of Flight	Woman	TV special	
2022	This Is Your Life: Rebecca Gibney	Self	1 episode	
2023	Five Bedrooms	Victoria	Season 4, 2 episodes	
2024	Bluey	Grown-Up Bluey (voice)	Season 3, 1 episode	
2026	Tales From Outer Suburbia	Lucy (voice)	10 episodes	

== Stage ==
In 2024, Hakewill joined the Australian theatre tour of the play Gaslight. In 2017, Hakewill would appear in Macbeth alongside Jai Courtney.

Year	Title	Role	Notes	Ref
2024	Gaslight	Bella	Queensland Theatre Co / Sydney / Melbourne	
2021	Julius Caeser	Various	Sydney Theatre Co	
2021	Homeboy/Kabul	Priscilla		
2019	The Real Thing	Annie	Sydney Theatre Co	
2017	Macbeth	Lady Macbeth	Melbourne Theatre Co	
2016	Low Level Panic	Celia	Old Fitz Theatre	
