= Wanted (2016 Australian TV series) =

Australian television series

- Promotional title card for Wanted
- Created by: Rebecca Gibney; Richard Bell
- Directed by: Peter Templeman; Jennifer Leacey; Rob Sarkies
- Starring: Rebecca Gibney; Geraldine Hakewill; Stephen Peacocke; Ryan Corr; Nicholas Bell
- Composer: Michael Yezerski
- Country of origin: Australia
- Original language: English
- No. of seasons: 3
- No. of episodes: 18

Production
- Executive producers: Tony Ayres; Rebecca Gibney; Julie McGauran
- Producers: Andrew Walker; Richard Bell; Chloe Smith
- Cinematography: John Stokes; Simon Raby
- Editors: James Manché; Andrew Macneil; Paul Maxwell
- Running time: 44–46 minutes
- Production companies: Matchbox Pictures; R&R Productions

Original release
- Network: Seven Network
- Release: 9 February 2016 – 29 October 2018

Wanted is an Australian drama television series which premiered on the Seven Network in Australia on 9 February 2016. The first season consisted of six episodes. It was renewed for a six-episode second season, which premiered with a double-episode on 5 June 2017. The series was renewed for a third and final season which premiered on 15 October 2018.

== Plot ==
Two women, Lola and Chelsea, are waiting at a suburban bus stop before midnight. A car crashes in front of them, and two masked men arrive and shoot the driver dead. Lola struggles with the masked attacker and the gun goes off, killing him. The other man is unmasked and he takes them both hostage. They escape but are caught up in a larger criminal conspiracy, and go on the run across Australia in a vehicle filled with cash. They are chased by criminals and corrupt police, being able to trust only each other. The end of season 1 seems to end with a resolution until Lola receives a disturbing call.

Season 2 finds the women in both Thailand and New Zealand as they try to save a kidnapped family member. Their bravery cost them their freedom, setting the stage for Season 3 which starts off with them being incarcerated. The women choose freedom through witness protection but trouble once again finds Lola where she decides to track down Chelsea, and the two go off on another run, while being relentlessly pursued by Detective Max Middleton. They come across a group of dangerous people involved in a human smuggling operation, choosing once again to risk their lives and freedom to be able help people begging for their help.

== Cast ==
- Rebecca Gibney as Lola Buckley
- Geraldine Hakewill as Chelsea Babbage
- Stephen Peacocke as Detective Josh Levine
- Kate Box as Detective Maxine "Max" Middleton (season 3)
- Ryan Corr as Chris Murphett (season 1)
- Nicholas Bell as Ray Stanton
- Mirko Grillini as Terry Boke (season 1)
- Todd Levi as Ebert (season 1)
- Nicholas Hamilton as Jamie (season 1)
- Veronica Neave as Karen Stanton
- Anthony Phelan as Kelvin "Kel" Morrison
- Charles Cottier as David Buckley
- Dean O'Gorman as Will Johnson (season 2)
- Robyn Malcolm as Donna Walsh, Lola's sister
- Kerry Fox as Susan Carpenter (season 3)
- Clarence Ryan as Hamish, Max's partner (season 3)
- Michael Whalley as Lance Greiner (season 3)
- Rob Carlton as Karl Brady (season 3)
- Sarah Milde as Lucie
- Alex Malone as Sophie (season 3)
- Paul Gleeson as Tom McKaw, Max's superior (season 3)
- Neil Fanning as Roadhouse Cop
- Ian Bliss as Luke Delaney
- Steven Rooke as Jackson Delaney
- Ian Mune as Jim Walsh
- Catherine Wilkin as Beverley Delaney
- Edmund Lembke-Hogan as Constable McKenzie
- Pat Thomson as Motel owner
- Paul Bishop as Bernie
- Alex Dimitriades as Anton Maric
- Christopher Sommers as Dirk
- Simon Mallory as Sergeant Hunt
- Narelle King as Dixie Boulevard
- Ryan Corr as Chris Murphett
- Clarence Ryan as Hamish

== Episodes ==
=== Season 1 (2016) ===
| No. overall | No. in season | Title | Directed by | Written by | Original release date | Aus. viewers (millions) |
|---|---|---|---|---|---|---|
| 1 | 1 | "Chelsea and Lola" | Peter Templeman | Timothy Hobart | 9 February 2016 | 1.184 |
Lola Buckley, an outspoken supermarket teller, and Chelsea Babbage, a regimented accountant who is currently being investigated for embezzlement, routinely take a Sydney city bus to go back and forth to their respective workplaces. One night, the two ladies wait at their bus stop when a car appears with another one in pursuit, ultimately involving a shooting that kills a man. As Lola and Chelsea are witnesses, they then find themselves kidnapped, locked in the boot of a car. As the car stops for a rendez-vous, Chelsea calls the police who soon arrive but whose actions appear suspicious to Lola. Lola & Chelsea have no choice but to flee and find a safe place: a summer home in the country owned by Chelsea's father, which is soon visited by corrupt lead police detective Ray Stanton.
| 2 | 2 | "Run Lola Run" | Peter Templeman | John Ridley | 16 February 2016 | 0.922 |
Lola and Chelsea continue on the run, crossing into Queensland. Lola assures Chelsea about approaching the local police to tell their side of the story. Lola and Chelsea stop by a motel for the night but are soon recognized from the TV news reports. Detective Levine uncovers that not one, but two people may have been involved in the crime. An opportunity presents itself for Lola & Chelsea to leave town just as Boke, the contract killer Ray hires, is closing in on their location.
| 3 | 3 | "Us and Them" | Peter Templeman | Kirsty Fisher | 23 February 2016 | 0.899 |
Lola and Chelsea get lost walking through Idalia National Park, after their car runs out of fuel. Chelsea reveals more about her life to Lola. Detective Levine digs in to Lola's history, deciding to go to the area where she grew up without telling Ray. The ladies are arrested by a park ranger. Boke gets closer. The ladies find that their car has disappeared. Lola reaches out to her family for help.
| 4 | 4 | "Badlands" | Jennifer Leacey | John Ridley | 1 March 2016 | 0.962 |
Lola and Chelsea head to Wooradulla where Lola reconnects with her sister and father in search of a source to get new identities. Chelsea's secret obsession gets her into trouble. Lola admits to Chelsea to what extent they may need to be running. As the ladies search for their missing car, they are captured by a small-time crime family, the Delaneys, where one of them once had a connection with Lola. Boke arrives in the area, tracking down the Delaneys but just missing the ladies. Detective Levine arrives soon after, but Boke flees the scene.
| 5 | 5 | "Detour" | Jennifer Leacey | John Ridley | 8 March 2016 | 0.872 |
The ladies track their car to Baruma, but get separated soon after they arrive. Chelsea gets into trouble but uses her ingenuity to get out of it. Detective Levine recovers both the car and the fugitives. Stanton flies out there himself to clean up the mess. Boke reappears, leading to a violent confrontation with Lola.
| 6 | 6 | "Dead End" | Jennifer Leacey | Timothy Hobart | 8 March 2016 | 0.764 |
Chelsea finds an injured Lola, as the police close in on their trail. The ladies find refuge at a hideout known to Lola. Lola meets up with her son, David. Ray Stanton frames Detective Levine. Victor Maric catches up to Lola. The ladies and Ray have a stand off. As the ladies make plans to disappear for a while, Lola receives a disturbing call from Morrison.

=== Season 2 (2017) ===
| No. overall | No. in season | Title | Directed by | Written by | Original release date | Aus. viewers (millions) |
|---|---|---|---|---|---|---|
| 7 | 1 | "Episode 1" | Rob Sarkies | Timothy Hobart | 5 June 2017 | 0.698 |
The ladies arrange to be smuggled into Bangkok in order for Lola to make the exchange with Morrison. Ray Stanton is not adjusting well to his new life, pleading with his lawyer for a change in scenery. After the exchange fails, the ladies discover Morrison's true motives, making Lola even more determined to achieve her goal. The ladies find out the value of the key tag. A desperate Stanton makes a move. The ladies finally find David, taking him with them but at an expense.
| 8 | 2 | "Episode 2" | Rob Sarkies | John Ridley | 5 June 2017 | 0.534 |
David is quickly treated for his injury but flees with the ladies as Morrison's men move in. Morrison tries to get to Lola by targeting her family. Lola remains unswayed but warns Chelsea to alert her own father for his own safety, which she does but seems stoic about it. Lola is curious about what the key tag opens that she and Chelsea fly to Dunedin to find out. Chelsea is detained at the border. The ladies are surprised by the contents of the security box. David's own troubles catches up to him. Lola finds out the identity of who is threatening her, while Chelsea seems to have found a male suitor, Will Johnson, who winds up taking advantage of her. Ray Stanton strikes a deal with Morrison, flying off to New Zealand to find the ladies.
| 9 | 3 | "Episode 3" | Rob Sarkies | John Ridley | 12 June 2017 | 0.633 |
The ladies take a train to hunt down Will Johnson but their actions are noticed, tipping off Ray Stanton. Lola asks Chelsea about her abnormal behaviour regarding Will. As Ray intercepts the train, the ladies change their mode of transport. Will photographs what Lola found in the security box, sending it to Morrison for ransom. The ladies ultimately find an accident site. David's problem flares up again uncontrollably. The ladies capture Will in a cabin, who tells the ladies the story behind what Morrison wants so badly. Chelsea has a flashback of her youth. Ray arrives at the cabin in a violent manner. While the ladies save Will's life, Ray gets away with what Morrison wants. Lola gets a voicemail from David, who says that he is in trouble.
| 10 | 4 | "Episode 4" | Peter Salmon | John Ridley | 19 June 2017 | 0.759 |
The ladies take Will hostage, who leads them to a new means of transportation. Lola makes contact with David, deciding to bring him to Queenstown to join her. In order to get money to pay for David's flight, the ladies commit a crime where Chelsea is identified. Lola tracks down Ray Stanton, who is en route to meeting Morrison for the exchange. Detective Levine arrives in New Zealand. The victim of the ladies' crime find out where they are staying, seeking vengeance. Ray finds an opportunity to get away from Lola. Morrison and Ray make the exchange, while Lola arrives just in time to see Morrison's true nature. Will reveals more about the security box item to Chelsea. Lola meets David at the airport, but trouble is found to have followed him.
| 11 | 5 | "Episode 5" | Peter Salmon | Timothy Hobart & Sarah Smith | 26 June 2017 | 0.581 |
Detective Levine is not convinced of the theory that Ray Stanton was working with the ladies. Lola finds that David has deceived her about his troubles. Chelsea and Will devise a plan after finding out that Lola is in trouble. David's condition gets worse, giving Lola no choice but to seek out an old friend. Chelsea reveals more about her family life to Lola. Morrison disposes of the evidence that could incriminate him, and orders his henchman to eliminate the witnesses. Will goes home to warn his mother that she is in danger but gets a surprise from her. Chelsea reaches out to her father, who is being monitored by the police. As the police move in on the ladies' position, David makes a sacrifice in order for his mother and Chelsea to get away, not knowing that Morrison's assassin is nearby.
| 12 | 6 | "Episode 6" | Peter Templeman | Timothy Hobart & John Ridley & Paddy Macrae | 3 July 2017 | 0.634 |
The ladies escape through the woods but come face to face with Morrison's assassin. The police follow the sound of a gunshot, leading them to Lola and Chelsea who ask them to surrender but Detective Levine intervenes. The ladies catch up to Will and his mother, who explains what evidence she has on Morrison. The ladies drive off to the evidence site but Chelsea is deceived by Lola. Will goes to help the ladies, after he finds out his mother has put them in danger. As Lola digs for the evidence, Morrison appears. Lola, Chelsea, and Will are surrounded by the police. Will surrenders to them in order to buy time for the ladies to get away. Lola and Chelsea come to a consensus to what their next move should be.

=== Season 3 (2018) ===
| No. overall | No. in season | Title | Directed by | Written by | Original release date | Aus. viewers (millions) |
|---|---|---|---|---|---|---|
| 13 | 1 | "Lock Up" | Peter Templeman | David Hannam | 15 October 2018 | 0.455 |
The ladies find themselves back in Australia, but incarcerated. Detective Max Middleton continues to interrogate Lola as to the whereabouts of Morrison. Lola finds herself in danger, making a deal with inmate Susan Carpenter to orchestrate a way for her and Chelsea to get out. The ladies then find themselves in witness protection, leading new but separate lives. Lola is now Stella, a groundskeeper, while Chelsea is now Debbie, a call center representative. Lola starts to track down Susan's daughter Sophie but is shunned away by her only lead, Lance Greiner. Chelsea gets bad news regarding her health. Both ladies find themselves on the run together again after Lola returns home to a disturbing scene.
| 14 | 2 | "Drive" | Peter Templeman | Michaeley O'Brien | 15 October 2018 | 0.396 |
Max is not convinced that Lola was the culprit at the crime scene, later visiting Lola's sister, Donna, as to where Lola may be. Chelsea notices Lance's car at a motel, where the ladies stop to get more information but get more than they bargained for. After realising what kind of criminal Lance is, the ladies first rescue bartender Elsa, but then return to rescue more captives. The ladies' failed efforts get themselves in a local police jail cell, awaiting extradition by Max. Chelsea tells Lola that she is willing to confess. Lola and Chelsea are about to be handed over, not to Max but to Karl Brady, who does not appear to be police.
| 15 | 3 | "Snakeskin" | Peter Templeman | Elizabeth Coleman | 22 October 2018 | 0.450 |
Brady takes the ladies away but are intercepted by Lance. The ladies manage to get away while Max finds Brady, who reminds her of her past indiscretions. The ladies abandon their vehicle, walking to a farmhouse to find more trouble. Max makes the connection between Sophie and Susan Carpenter. The ladies try to get to safety with a houseboat but are soon chased by Brady. Chelsea chastises Lola for her perception of her privileged upbringing as well as her unwillingness to help the women threatened by Lance. The ladies track down Lance's operations, trying to rescue the women, but are then trapped themselves.
| 16 | 4 | "Stuck" | Jocelyn Moorhouse | David Hannam | 22 October 2018 | 0.379 |
The ladies try to find a way out. Lola has flashbacks of her turbulent childhood. Chelsea persuades Lance's women to help. The ladies find Sophie, who turns out to be not what they expected. Max tails Lola's sister Donna in hopes that she will lead them to Lola. Under gunfire, the ladies escape but are soon captured by other parties. Chelsea betrays Lola in order to save their lives. Brady forces Lola to make the intended exchange with Donna. Max tells Brady about her true loyalties. Max tries in vain to catch the ladies and Donna.
| 17 | 5 | "Divide" | Jocelyn Moorhouse | Leon Ford | 29 October 2018 | 0.400 |
The ladies try to make their way on foot when Chelsea reveals that she has a childhood friend, Alistair, with a winery in the area. Max’s actions gets her in trouble. Susan Carpenter finds Sophie. Chelsea finds comfort with Alistair. Lola walks out after Chelsea confronts her about her fear of abandonment. Lola visits her mother. Just as the ladies are about to find the ultimate refuge, Lola is shown a plea for help from May, one of Lance's captives.
| 18 | 6 | "Outlaws" | Jocelyn Moorhouse | Michaeley O'Brien | 29 October 2018 | 0.307 |
The ladies abandon their chances to be free, deciding to take action against Susan Carpenter. Susan reassures Max that Lola will be coming to meet her. The ladies find an uncooperative Sophie but Chelsea's misstep works out in their favour. Lola first meets Max, then Susan but gets bad news from Chelsea, setting off an explosive chain of events. Chelsea reveals her condition to Lola. Lance is shocked by Susan's lack of decency as they hide their captives. The ladies and Max stage a rescue but then revert to their original roles. The ladies state their case, as Max makes a final decision for both them and her career. Lola and Chelsea contemplate Western Australia.

== Production ==
The series was first announced in August 2015 following an undisclosed funding amount from Screen Australia and investment of AU$27,768 from Screen Queensland. The series was filmed in various locations in Queensland. Shirley Barrett was initially named as director, but Peter Templeman and Jennifer Leacey were later named. The series is created by husband and wife Rebecca Gibney and Richard Bell, co-founders of R&R Productions which is the production company behind the series, along with Matchbox Pictures. The series will be distributed internationally by Universal Media Studios International.

Production began in September 2015 and wrapped in early December, totalling 10 weeks in 60 locations. In August 2016, it was confirmed that Wanted had been renewed for a second season of six episodes filmed in Australia, New Zealand, and Thailand.

== Promotion ==
The Seven Network released a 90-second promo in December 2015, advising the series would begin airing in February 2016. The premiere date was later confirmed as 9 February.

== Ratings ==
=== Season 1 (2016) ===
The first season averaged 1.24 million viewers and was the highest rated Australian drama series of 2016.

| No. | Title | Air date | Overnight ratings | | Consolidated ratings | | Total viewers | Ref(s) |
| No. | Title | Air date | Viewers | Rank | Viewers | Rank | Total viewers | Ref(s) |
|---|---|---|---|---|---|---|---|---|
| 1 | Episode 1 | 9 February 2016 | 1,184,000 | 3 | 237,000 | 3 | 1,421,000 | |
| 2 | Episode 2 | 16 February 2016 | 922,000 | 9 | 251,000 | 2 | 1,173,000 | |
| 3 | Episode 3 | 23 February 2016 | 899,000 | 7 | 198,000 | 3 | 1,097,000 | |
| 4 | Episode 4 | 1 March 2016 | 962,000 | 5 | 224,000 | 2 | 1,187,000 | |
| 5 | Episode 5 | 8 March 2016 | 872,000 | 6 | 246,000 | 2 | 1,119,000 | |
| 6 | Episode 6 | 8 March 2016 | 764,000 | 10 | 253,000 | 4 | 1,017,000 | |

=== Season 2 (2017) ===
| No. | Title | Air date | Overnight ratings | | Consolidated ratings | | Total viewers | Ref(s) |
| No. | Title | Air date | Viewers | Rank | Viewers | Rank | Total viewers | Ref(s) |
|---|---|---|---|---|---|---|---|---|
| 1 | Episode 1 | 5 June 2017 | 698,000 | 16 | 120,000 | 14 | 818,000 | |
| 2 | Episode 2 | 5 June 2017 | 534,000 | —N/a | 122,000 | 19 | 656,000 | |
| 3 | Episode 3 | 12 June 2017 | 633,000 | 18 | 123,000 | 14 | 756,000 | |
| 4 | Episode 4 | 19 June 2017 | 759,000 | 12 | 60,000 | 12 | 819,000 | |
| 5 | Episode 5 | 26 June 2017 | 581,000 | 20 | 129,000 | 16 | 710,000 | |
| 6 | Episode 6 | 3 July 2017 | 634,000 | 15 | 129,000 | 12 | 763,000 | |

=== Season 3 (2018) ===
| No. | Title | Air date | Overnight ratings | | Consolidated ratings | | Total viewers | Ref(s) |
| No. | Title | Air date | Viewers | Rank | Viewers | Rank | Total viewers | Ref(s) |
|---|---|---|---|---|---|---|---|---|
| 1 | Episode 1 | 15 October 2018 | 455,000 | 18 | 110,000 | 14 | 565,000 | |
| 2 | Episode 2 | 15 October 2018 | 396,000 | 20 | 108,000 | 17 | 504,000 | |
| 3 | Episode 3 | 22 October 2018 | 450,000 | 18 | 108,000 | 13 | 558,000 | |
| 4 | Episode 4 | 22 October 2018 | 379,000 | —N/a | 118,000 | 17 | 497,000 | |
| 5 | Episode 5 | 29 October 2018 | 400,000 | 18 | 123,000 | 15 | 523,000 | |
| 6 | Episode 6 | 29 October 2018 | 307,000 | —N/a | 112,000 | 19 | 419,000 | |

== Home media ==
| Title | Format | Episodes | Discs | Region 4 (Australia) | Special features | Distributors |
|---|---|---|---|---|---|---|
| Wanted Season One | DVD | 6 | 2 | 5 May 2016 | None | Universal Sony Pictures |
| Wanted Season Two | DVD | 6 | 2 | 16 August 2017 | None | Universal Sony Pictures |
| Wanted Season Three | DVD | 6 | 2 | 20 February 2019 | None | Universal Sony Pictures |

== Awards and nominations ==
| Year | Organization | Category | Nominees | Result | Ref. |
|---|---|---|---|---|---|
| 2017 | 45th International Emmy Awards | Drama Series | Wanted | Nominated | |
