= Go Karts (film) =

2019 film by Owen Trevor

- Film poster
- Directed by: Owen Trevor
- Written by: Steve Worland
- Produced by: Sonia Borella; Jamie Hilton
- Starring: William Lodder; Anastasia Bampos; Frances O'Connor; Richard Roxburgh
- Production company: See Pictures
- Distributed by: Roadshow Films (Australia and New Zealand); Netflix (International)
- Release dates: 28 August 2019 (CinefestOZ); 16 January 2020
- Running time: 102 minutes
- Country: Australia
- Language: English

Go Karts, also known as Go!, is a 2019 Australian teen coming-of-age sports drama film directed by Owen Trevor on his feature film directorial debut. The film stars William Lodder, Frances O'Connor and Richard Roxburgh in the lead roles. Its storyline resembles that of the 1984 American martial arts drama film The Karate Kid. The film is based on a kart racing community in Western Australia and their underdog who wins the National Kart racing championship.

The film, originally titled Go!, premiered at the 2019 CinefestOZ Film Festival and was released to theatres on 16 January 2020 in Australia. Under the title Go Karts, the film was added to Netflix globally on 13 March 2020 excluding Australia and New Zealand and opened to mixed reviews from critics.

== Plot ==
Jack and his single mother Christie move into a small town in Western Australia. Jack relieves his painful memory as he lost his father Hooper from cancer.

Jack later helps his mum loading things into her new business shop. While helping his mum, she tells him to go to a party at a go kart track. He develops an interest, love and passion for go karting at the birthday party of Mandy, a budding mechanic, who becomes a friend. Jack discovers he is really good at the sport and starts training but must learn to control his recklessness. He strives hard to win the Australian National Go Karts Championship by defeating the best drivers in Australia. He gets the support of Mandy, his mentor Patrick and his best mate Colin. However he has to confront many obstacles to defeat the ruthless champion, Dean, who is his strongest competitor, and has the support of his father, Mike, who owns a race team.

== Cast ==
- William Lodder as Jack Hooper
- Frances O'Connor as Christie Hooper, Jack's mother
- Adam T Perkin as Hooper, Jack's father
- Richard Roxburgh as Patrick
- Dan Wyllie as Barry, the local police officer
- Darius Amarfio-Jefferson as Colin
- Anastasia Bampos as Mandy Zeta
- Cooper van Grootel as Dean Zeta
- Damian de Montemas as Mike Zeta

== Production ==
The film marked debut directorial venture for Owen Trevor, who previously helmed short films. The film was made completely based on crowdfunding, funded by Screen Australia, Screenwest, and Lotterywest, Spectrum Films, Create NSW, Media Super, Fulcrum Media Finance. Principal photography of the film commenced in Busselton in April 2018.

In April 2018, the producers of the film advertised via online platforms to recruit required drivers, teams, officials and spectators for the shooting of the film. The film was entirely shot and set in Australia on the backdrop of kart racing sport. It was predominantly filmed in Western Australia, especially in Perth, and at few race tracks such as Cockburn International Kartway and Bunbury City Kart Club.

== Release ==
The official trailer of the film was unveiled by Roadshow Films on 22 August 2019 and the film was also premiered at the 2019 CinefestOZ film festival.

Netflix bought the worldwide rights of the film excluding Australia and New Zealand, and unveiled its official trailer on 27 February 2020.
