= Arctic Blast =

2010 Australian–Canadian science fiction film

- Theatrical release poster
- Directed by: Brian Trenchard-Smith
- Written by: Jason Bourque
- Produced by: Gina Black; Stefan Wodoslawsky
- Starring: Michael Shanks; Alexandra Davies
- Release date: April 4, 2010 (Australia)
- Running time: 90 minutes
- Countries: Australia; Canada
- Language: English
- Budget: $1.8 million

Arctic Blast is a 2010 science-fiction film directed by Brian Trenchard-Smith. Jointly produced between Australia and Canada, the film stars Michael Shanks, Alexandra Davies, Saskia Hampele, Indiana Evans, Robert Mammone and Bruce Davison. The film depicts a life-threatening and cataclysmic mesospheric air breaching through the ozone layer, freezing the planet and threatening a worldwide ice age.

== Plot ==
High above the Pacific Ocean, the solar eclipse triggers a rapid drop of temperature of the mesosphere. Its cold and denser air penetrates through the weakened ozone layer and the resulting ice fog spreads around the funnel. A International Climate Research Organization (ICRO) meteorologist Jack Tate and his colleagues Zoe Quinn and Alex monitor an atmospheric anomaly when a rapidly spreading ice fog engulfs their research vessel, killing Alex and everyone on board.

In Hobart, Jack is facing a possible divorce from Emma, a forensic pathologist, due to their strained relationship with her and their daughter Naomi and his unwillingness to quit ICRO to care for their family. After an appointment with a divorce lawyer, Jack learns their research vessel had run aground. Autopsy on one of the ICRO's research vessel crew confirms they succumbed to flash freeze three days ago when he and Zoe last contacted Alex. Zoe salvages what was left of the research data from the vessel and finds satellite images of a rapidly expanding cold front. Jack – fearing there may be little time to warn the populace as the cold front approaches Tasmania – picks up Naomi from Ryan's Beach just as the cold front swallows the beach, killing her two friends. They narrowly outrun the cold wave before they managed to hunker down inside the ICRO research facility.

With the cold wave enveloping Hobart, Emma and her grandparents also hunker down inside their home, where they hear a little girl screaming and bring her inside their home. Despite their best efforts to keep her warm, she later dies of cold shock. The rupture of the ozone layer near Tasmania triggered more ozone rifts across the world, producing several more mesospheric cold fronts. Walter Winslaw, an American researcher of ICRO, coordinates a joint effort to close the rift by using fighter jets to disperse magnesium phosphate deployed by weather balloons into the atmosphere, but their aircraft carrier was swallowed by the new cold front, and the magnesium dispersal fails to close the ozone rift.

Initially skeptical of Jack, Winslaw decides to follow Jack's new plan to launch high altitude rockets loaded with ammonium nitrate to detonate above the stratosphere, which will generate lighting around the rift and allow the ozone layer to regenerate. As they finish the payload calculations, Zoe falls into diabetic ketoacidosis; Jack heads out into the frozen streets of Hobart to grab insulin from the pharmacy, while Naomi tries to upload the simulation data to Walter before the cold front could reach the Vandeburg Space Force Base in California, but the facility's generators stops working. Jack eventually returns with the insulin and manages to restart the generator before uploading the payload calculations, allowing the US military to launch the missiles.

The rockets detonate, dispersing ammonium nitrate into the stratosphere. Eventually, the ozone layer is finally replenished, and the cold fronts gradually dissipates. As more countries launch more ammonium nitrate dispersals, the ice began to thaw, averting the impending ice age. Jack and Naomi reunite with Emma and reconcile.

== Cast ==
- Michael Shanks as Jack Tate
- Alexandra Davies as Emma Tate
- Saskia Hampele as Zoe Quinn
- Indiana Evans as Naomi Tate
- Robert Mammone as Charlie Barker
- Bruce Davison as Walter Winslaw
- Nick Falk as Brent Durant (credited as Nicholas Falk)
- Judith Baribeau as Tammy
- Andrew Casey as Alex

== Production ==
Principal photography took place over eighteen days in 2009 – sixteen in Hobart, Tasmania, plus two in Ottawa, Canada for scenes with Bruce Davison. Post-production work was done in Canada.

Trenchard-Smith later wrote "it was a challenge to make what looks like a bank of thick morning fog feel scary."

== Reception ==
Trenchard-Smith was happy with the end result, writing "I'm quite proud of the film. It's a strong example of its micro-genre, and I had a good time making it."

SciFiDimensions gave the film a balanced review with pros and cons, saying it was "passable but ... forgettable" among disaster movies, with its flaws holding back its potential.
