= Pippa Grandison =

Australian actress and singer

- Born: Pippa Jody Grandison; 12 September 1970 (age 56); Perth, West Australia
- Occupations: Actress, singer
- Spouse: Steve Le Marquand

Pippa Jody Grandison (born 12 September 1970) is an Australian actress, singer and director. She currently lives in Sydney, with her husband Steve Le Marquand and child.

== Career ==
Pippa Grandison was born in Perth, Western Australia. She made her debut in the Australian television drama series A Country Practice in 1990. Notable TV and film credits include All Saints (1999–2006), Muriel's Wedding (1994) and Babe: Pig in the City (1998; voice role). Grandison then became part of a pop group called Ladykiller, and began to dedicate her singing voice to musical theatre, playing leading roles in the musicals The Witches of Eastwick, We Will Rock You, Company, and "Georgy Girl": Story Of The Seekers.

=== Wicked ===
She later received the chance to star in the role of Elphaba in the Australian production of the musical Wicked during the Sydney season of the show, when its main star, Amanda Harrison, fell ill. Grandison shared the role with Jemma Rix; each of them performing four shows a week. Her first show took place on 18 December 2009. She was initially a temporary replacement, until it was announced on 9 February 2010, that Harrison would no longer be returning to the show, and that Grandison and Rix would be alternating as the lead on a permanent basis.

She exited the company on 23 May 2010, at the end of her contract. Her replacement was Patrice Tipoki, who understudied the role in the original Australian cast.

== Filmography ==
Film
Year	Title	Role	Notes
1992	Over the Hill	Margaret	Feature film
1994	Muriel's Wedding	Nicole	Feature film
1996	Hotel de Love	Allison Leigh	Feature film
1996	Dating the Enemy	Colette	Feature film
1998	Two Girls and a Baby	Simone	Short film
1998	Babe: Pig in the City	Additional voices	Feature film
1999	Change of Heart	Sammi	
2000	Mr. Accident	Nightclub Natasha	Feature film
2001	Home Straight	Wife #2	Short film
2002	Sway	Phoebe	
2004	Lovesong	Helena	Short film
2007	Two Door Mansion	Jennifer Holding	Featuee film
2008	Rebecca	Rebecca	Short film
2009	Franswa Sharl	Wendy Bishop	Short film
2016	Broke	Duty Manager	Feature film
2020	Torch Song	Eve	Short film
2021	Akoni		Feature film

Television
Year	Title	Role	Notes
1990	A Country Practice	Miriam Biggs	4 episodes
1991	G.P.	Lucy Carmichael	4 episodes
1991	Golden Fiddles	Elsa Balfour	TV miniseries
1991	Brides of Christ	Bernadette	TV miniseries
1991	Tonight Live With Steve Vizard	Herself – Guest	TV series, 1 episode
1992	The Morning Show	Herself – Guest	TV series, 1 episode
1993	Time Trax		"The Price of Honor"
1993	E Street	Melanie	TV series
1996	Twisted Tales	Karen	"The Test"
1996	Water Rats	Fran Marsden	"Goldstein & Son"
1997	Big Sky	Angel	"Triskaidekaphobia"
1999	All Saints	Simone Carlisle	3 episodes
2000	The Three Stooges	Blonde	TV movie
2001	South Pacific	Nurse	TV movie
2003	Balmain Boys	Sheena	TV movie
2004	New MacDonald's Farm	Milly (voice)	TV series
2006	All Saints	Leanne Warren	"One Wrong Step"
2011	Small Time Gangster	Sally	"Who's Got the RPG?"
2011	Underbelly	Mona Woods	13 episodes
2015	Today Extra	Herself – Guest	TV series, 1 episode
2015	The Morning Show	Herself – Guest	TV series, 1 episode
2015	Event	Herself – Guest & Judith Durham	TV series, 1 episode
2016	Here Come the Habibs	Anthea	2 Episodes
2019–2022	Frayed	Trish	7 episodes
2023	The Claremont Murders		TV miniseries, 1 episode
