= Tasia Zalar =

Australian actress and musician (born 1992)

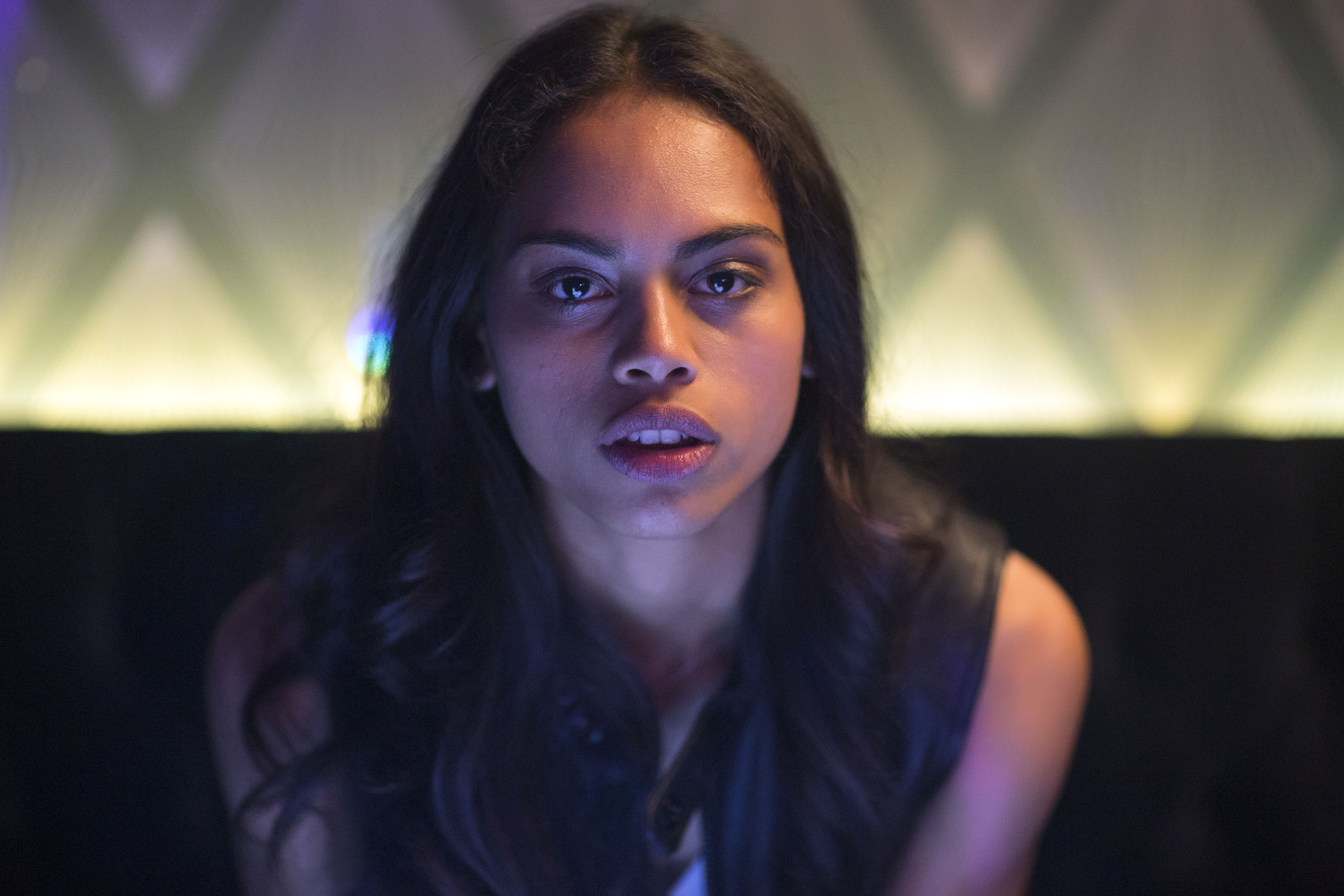
- Zalar in 2016
- Born: 1992 (age 32–33); Cairns, Queensland, Australia
- Occupation: Actress
- Years active: 2009–present

Tasia Zalar (born 1992) is an Indigenous Australian actress and musician. She was nominated for Most Popular New Talent at the Logie Awards for her role as Shevorne Shields in the ABC series Mystery Road. She appeared on Elle Australia's List of 2019.

== Early life ==
Zalar was born in Cairns in Far North Queensland. She is of Gunggandji, Kaurareg, Gugu Thaypan, Mualgal, Gumulgal, and Wuthathi heritage. She attended Trinity Bay State High School. She played football and marngrook with the North Cairns Tigers growing up. She moved to Melbourne at 19 and splits her time between there and Townsville.

== Career ==
Zalar began her career when she was 15 in the titular role of the short film Nia's Melancholy, which premiered at the 2009 Message Sticks Festival. She then made her feature film debut as Coral in Uninhabited and her television debut as Bridget Titui in the ABC1 miniseries The Straits.

In 2018, Zalar began starring as Shevorne Shields in the neo-Western series Mystery Road. In addition to receiving a Logie nomination, she won two Equity Ensemble Awards alongside her cast mates. In film, she appeared in the Vale Light installment of the 2019 horror anthology Dark Place, the 2021 sports drama Streamline, and the sequel to the zombie apocalypse film Wyrmwood.

== Filmography ==
=== Film ===
| Year | Title | Role | Notes |
|---|---|---|---|
| 2009 | Nia's Melancholy | Nia | Short film |
| 2010 | Uninhabited | Coral | |
| 2015 | Bluey | Bluey | Short film |
| 2017 | Blight | Tracker | Short film |
| 2018 | Kapara | Lydia George | Short film |
| 2019 | Dark Place | Shae | Anthology: Vale Light |
| 2019 | Closed Doors | Girl | Short film |
| 2021 | Streamline | Patti Hill | |
| 2021 | Wyrmwood: Apocalypse | Grace | |

=== Television ===
| Year | Title | Role | Notes |
|---|---|---|---|
| 2012 | The Straits | Bridget Titui | 7 episodes |
| 2014–2015 | Wentworth | Jianna Riley | 2 episodes |
| 2017 | The Warriors | Ava | 2 episodes |
| 2018–present | Mystery Road | Shevorne Shields | Main role |
| 2018 | Wrong Kind of Black | Chicky | Miniseries |
| 2019 | Get Krack!n | Willow | 1 episode |

== Awards and nominations ==
| Year | Award | Category | Work | Result | Ref |
|---|---|---|---|---|---|
| 2019 | Logie Awards | Most Popular New Talent | Mystery Road | Nominated | |
| 2019 | Equity Ensemble Awards | (shared) | Mystery Road | Won | |
| 2021 | Equity Ensemble Awards | (shared) | Mystery Road | Won | |
