= Thyestes (play) =

1680 play

- Original language: English
- Written by: John Crowne
- Genre: Tragedy

Premiere
- Date: March 1680
- Place: Theatre Royal, Drury Lane, London

Thyestes, A Tragedy is a 1680 tragedy by the English writer John Crowne. It was originally staged by the King's Company at the Theatre Royal, Drury Lane. The original cast is unknown. It is based on Thyestes by Seneca.

== Bibliography ==
- Jenkinson, Matthew. Culture and Politics at the Court of Charles II, 1660-1685. Boydell & Brewer, 2010.
- Van Lennep, W. The London Stage, 1660-1800: Volume One, 1660-1700. Southern Illinois University Press, 1960.
- White, Arthur Franklin. John Crowne: His Life and Dramatic Works. Routledge, 2019.
