= Brian Ralston =

Brian Ralston (born April 12, 1974) is a composer and musician living in Los Angeles. Ralston is a 2020 Hollywood Music In Media Awards winner for his contemporary classical piece "I think I'm Quite Ready For Another Adventure" inspired by Tolkien's Lord Of The Rings 2nd age. Brian is a graduate of the University of Arizona and the USC Thornton School of Music Scoring for Motion Pictures and Television program. Brian's latest film's are the 2022 Sci-Fi feature Silent River written and directed by Chris Chan Lee and the coming of age love drama About Him & Her directed by Ice Mrozek, produced by Independence Hall. Brian has also scored the 2017 drama Being Rose starring Cybill Shepherd, James Brolin and Pam Grier. In 2012 he scored the 20th Century Fox inspirational sports film Crooked Arrows, starring Brandon Routh, directed by Steve Rash. He has also composed music for the television series Angel (Season 4) and scores to the theatrical motion pictures 9/Tenths, directed by Bob Degus (Pleasantville) starring Gabrielle Anwar, Henry Ian Cusick and Dave Ortiz, the Magnolia Pictures teen heist movie Graduation directed by Mike Mayer and starring Adam Arkin, Shannon Lucio, Chris Marquette, Riley Smith and Chris Lowell, and the dramatic feature Don't Fade Away directed by Luke Kasdan, starring Beau Bridges, Mischa Barton and Ryan Kwanten.

Ralston was a producer and composer on a 2005 short comedy film entitled The Receipt starring Kristen Bell and Dina Meyer that has appeared in over 15 film festivals to date and won many awards including Best Comedy at the Los Angeles International Short Film Festival 2005, Best Short - Audience award at the Breckenridge Film Festival 2005 and the Gold Medal of Excellence for Ralston's score at the Park City Film Music Festival 2005.

Ralston also won an Aurora Award in 2005 for his score to The Receipt.

In the 2007 Park City Film Music Festival, Ralston won a gold medal for Best Use of Music in a Feature Film for his score to 9/Tenths.

Ralston plays the trumpet and piano, though trumpet is his primary instrument. He was a featured trumpet soloist in the 1998 Holiday Bowl halftime show.

Ralston is also currently an instructor in the UCLA Extension film scoring certificate program in Los Angeles where he teaches The Business Of Film Music course.
