= Jane Kurson =

American film editor

- Occupation: Film editor
- Years active: 1977–present

Jane Kurson is an American film editor known for her work on titles like Beetlejuice and Hot Shots!

== Selected filmography ==
Editor
Year	Film	Director	Notes	Ref.
1979	Don't Go in the House	Joseph Ellison		
1981	Neighbors	John G. Avildsen	Third collaboration with John G. Avildsen	
1986	The Karate Kid Part II	John G. Avildsen	Fourth collaboration with John G. Avildsen	
1987	Happy New Year	John G. Avildsen	Fifth collaboration with John G. Avildsen	
1988	Beetlejuice	Tim Burton		
1989	Immediate Family	Jonathan Kaplan	First collaboration with Jonathan Kaplan	
1991	Hot Shots!	Jim Abrahams		
1992	Love Field	Jonathan Kaplan	Second collaboration with Jonathan Kaplan	
1993	Amos & Andrew	E. Max Frye		
1994	Bad Girls	Jonathan Kaplan	Third collaboration with Jonathan Kaplan	
1996	Bed of Roses	Michael Goldenberg		
1998	Welcome to Hollywood	Tony Markes; Adam Rifkin		
2000	It Had to Be You	Steven Feder		
2001	Thank Heaven	John Asher		
2003	Monster	Patty Jenkins		
2004	Perfect Opposites	Matt Cooper		
2007	Graduation	Michael Mayer		
2009	Endless Bummer	Sam Pillsbury		

Editorial department
Year	Film	Director	Role	Notes
1978	Slow Dancing in the Big City	John G. Avildsen	Apprentice editor	First collaboration with John G. Avildsen
1980	The Formula	John G. Avildsen	Associate editor	Second collaboration with John G. Avildsen

Documentaries

Editor
Year	Film	Director
1978	Masters of Modern Sculpture Part I: The Pioneers	Michael Blackwood
1978	Masters of Modern Sculpture Part III: The New World	Michael Blackwood

Editorial department
Year	Film	Director	Role
1977	Pumping Iron	George Butler; Robert Fiore	Assistant editor

TV movies

Editor
Year	Film	Director
1983	The Haunted Mansion Mystery	Larry Elikann

TV series

Editor
Year	Title	Notes
1980	The Body Human	1 episode
1983	ABC Weekend Special	1 episode
