= Contact (1992 film) =

- Directed by: Jonathan Darby
- Written by: Jonathan Darby
- Produced by: Bob Degus; Jana Sue Memel; Laura Stuart
- Starring: Elias Koteas; Brad Pitt; J.T. Walsh
- Cinematography: Eric J. Goldstein
- Edited by: John Duffy
- Music by: Mark Chait
- Production company: Chanticleer Films
- Release date: July 23, 1992
- Running time: 30 minutes
- Country: United States
- Language: English

Contact is a 1992 short film directed by Jonathan Darby.

== Plot ==
Two soldiers, one Arab, the other American, confront during wartime in the desert hoping to kill each other, but they must survive by cooperating while laying down their arms.

== Cast ==
- Elias Koteas as Mohannan
- Brad Pitt as Cox
- J.T. Walsh as Radio Lieutenant

== Accolades ==
Contact was nominated for an Academy Award for Best Live Action Short Film in 1993.
