= Susan Soon He Stanton =

American playwright

Susan Soon He Stanton is an American playwright, television writer, and screenwriter. Stanton was a producer and writer for HBO's Succession, for which she won Emmy, WGA, and Peabody Awards. She has also written for The Baby, Modern Love, Dead Ringers, and Conversation with Friends.

== Biography ==
Stanton is from Aiea, Hawaii. She is of Korean and Chinese descent. Stanton attended NYU Tisch School of the Arts for a BFA and Yale School of Drama for an MFA Stanton was an inaugural recipient of the Venturous Playwrights Fellowship, an inaugural recipient of the Lark’s Van Lier Fellowship, and a two-time Sundance Institute Theater Lab Resident Playwright.

== Awards ==
- Leah Ryan Fund for Emerging Women Writers 2017
- The Kilroys’ List 2015, 2016, 2017
- Primetime Emmy Award for Outstanding Drama Series (Succession) 2022, 2023

== Works ==
=== Plays ===
- we, the invisibles
- Today Is My Birthday
- Both Your Houses
- Takarazuka!!!
- Cygnus
- Solstice Party!
- The Things Are Against Us
- The Underneath

=== Films ===
- Dress (2013, dir. Henry Ian Cusick)

=== Television ===
- Succession (2018–2023)
- Modern Love (2021)
- The Baby (2022)
- Conversations with Friends (2022)
- Dead Ringers (2023)
- Vladimir (2026)

=== Opera ===
- Turandot
