= Just Let Go =

Just Let Go may refer to:

- Just Let Go (film), a 2015 American film
- "Just Let Go" (Dexter), an episode of the American television series Dexter
- "Just Let Go" (Chucky), an episode of the American television series Chucky
- "Just Let Go", a song by Fischerspooner from the album Odyssey
