= Los Vampires =

2026 horror thriller film directed by Craig Mitchell

- Poster
- Directed by: Craig Mitchell
- Written by: Craig Mitchell
- Produced by: Ty Donaldson
- Starring: Henry Ian Cusick; Thomas Kretschmann; Daniela Couso; Jorge Diaz; Oscar Nuñez; Jefferson Mays
- Cinematography: Simon Coull
- Edited by: Evan Millard
- Music by: Josh Mancell
- Production company: Buddha-Cowboy Productions
- Release date: July 23, 2026 (Fantasia)
- Running time: 105 minutes
- Country: United States
- Languages: English; Spanish

Los Vampires is a 2026 American horror thriller film written and directed by Craig Mitchell. The film stars Henry Ian Cusick, Thomas Kretschmann, Daniela Couso, Jorge Diaz, Oscar Nuñez, and Jefferson Mays. The film is inspired by the production history of George Melford's 1931 Spanish-language adaptation of Dracula, presenting a fictionalized story set during the early Hollywood era.

== Premise ==
Set in Hollywood in 1930, Los Vampires follows Luis De Ossario, a Spanish actor who joins the production of a Spanish-language vampire film being shot overnight on the same sets used by an English-language production during the day.

As Luis attempts to match the performance of English-language star Kürt Orlov, tensions grow between the two productions. The rivalry becomes increasingly dangerous when a series of mysterious murders begins surrounding the studio, blurring the line between filmmaking and horror.

== Cast ==
- Henry Ian Cusick as Luis De Ossario
- Thomas Kretschmann as Kürt Orlov
- Daniela Couso as Vianca Sugura
- Jorge Diaz as Balthazar
- Oscar Nuñez as Gaspar Lazano
- Jefferson Mays as George Wilmore
- Carol Abney as Sister Aubrey
- Jake Regal as Dr. Wynn
- Andrew Baldwin as Jesuit
- Roman Phillips as Father Cristobal
- Melissa Falcone as Party-Goer
- Isabella Feliciana as Camilla

== Production ==
Los Vampires was written and directed by Craig Mitchell and produced by Ty Donaldson. Scott Bridges and Paul W. Hazen served as executive producers. The film was produced under Buddha-Cowboy Productions.

The film's creative team included cinematographer Simon Coull, editor Evan Millard, composer Josh Mancell, production designer Ricardo Jattan, and casting director Joey Montenarello.

The story draws inspiration from the making of the 1931 Spanish-language version of Dracula, which was filmed using the same Universal Studios sets as the English-language production. Unlike a traditional adaptation, Los Vampires uses the historical production as the foundation for a fictional supernatural thriller exploring cinema, identity, and artistic ambition.

== Release ==
Los Vampires was selected for the 2026 Fantasia International Film Festival as part of the festival's 30th edition programming.

The film was scheduled for release in 2026.

== Reception ==
Los Vampires has received coverage from independent film publications and genre cinema outlets following its festival selection. The film was included in the 2026 Fantasia International Film Festival lineup and received review coverage from RogerEbert.com and The Fright Club.

=== Critical response ===
Clint Worthington of RogerEbert.com praised the performances of Henry Ian Cusick, Thomas Kretschmann, and Daniela Couso, highlighting the film's atmosphere and its exploration of filmmaking, Hollywood history, censorship, immigration, and exploitation.

Worthington described the film as an ambitious period horror story and praised its recreation of early Hollywood filmmaking, while criticizing some uneven thematic development and elements of the sound design.

In a Fantasia preview article, Worthington highlighted the film's premise as a fictional exploration of the compromises involved in filmmaking and its connection to the history of the Spanish-language Dracula production.

Gavin Logan of The Fright Club awarded the film three out of five stars, praising the concept, performances, and classic horror influences while criticizing aspects of the pacing.

Dennis Harvey of Variety praised its gothic setting, historical homage, and the lead performances of Henry Ian Cusick and Thomas Kretschmann. The film was commended for its atmospheric blend of 1930s Hollywood history and supernatural horror, though some reviewers noted pacing issues in its second half.
