= F/X2 =

1991 film by Richard Franklin

- Theatrical release poster
- Directed by: Richard Franklin
- Written by: Bill Condon
- Produced by: Dodi Fayed; Jack Wiener
- Starring: Bryan Brown; Brian Dennehy
- Cinematography: Victor J. Kemper
- Edited by: Andrew London
- Music by: Lalo Schifrin
- Distributed by: Orion Pictures (United States); Columbia Pictures (International)
- Release date: May 10, 1991
- Running time: 108 minutes
- Country: United States
- Language: English
- Budget: $18 million
- Box office: $21.1 million

F/X2 (also known as F/X2: The Deadly Art of Illusion) is a 1991 American action thriller film directed by Richard Franklin and starring Bryan Brown and Brian Dennehy. It is a sequel to the 1986 film F/X, and follows special effects expert Ronald "Rollie" Tyler and former NYPD detective Leo McCarthy as they investigate the suspicious death of one of Rollie's friends.

F/X2 was Franklin's final American film before he returned to his native Australia. It was released to mixed reviews and was a moderate box office success, earning $21.1 million on a budget of $18 million.

== Plot ==
In New York City, special effects expert Rollie Tyler is contacted by his girlfriend Kim Brandon's ex-husband, NYPD detective Mike Brandon, to help apprehend a murderer targeting models who was arrested previously but served a reduced sentence and could strike again. The trap involves luring the murderer to the apartment of a model, where Mike will arrest him. Rollie sets up the trap and watches using hidden cameras, but Mike is killed by an unidentified assailant in the apartment, while Mike's superior Ray Silak shoots the model murderer. Silak is confident there were only two people in the apartment, but Rollie remains suspicious. He accidentally leaves a hidden camera in the apartment and contacts his friend, former detective Leo McCarthy, for help.

The next day, Rollie, Kim, and Kim's son Chris go to Mike's house to collect some of Chris's personal items. They find the house being searched by police, including Silak, who questions Rollie about the hidden camera. Silak now admits that someone else could have been in the apartment, suggesting Mike's killer could be another cop. Rollie is further questioned and asked if Mike mentioned any old cases he was working on. Suspicious of Silak and suspecting Mike was set up, Rollie drives Kim and Chris to her sister's house for their safety and goes home to look through the camera footage. He sees Silak planting evidence to frame the model murderer for Mike's death. The actual killer has snuck into Rollie's loft and surprises him demanding the recording. Rollie uses Bluey, a robot clown controlled by a telemetry suit, to fight the killer, and makes his way out the fire escape. Leo McCarthy arrives to rescue Rollie, but the killer escapes.

At Leo's bar, Rollie explains the situation, and Leo deduces that Silak is interested in an unsolved case that Mike was working on in his spare time. Leo asks his old police contact Velez to go through Mike's cases, while Rollie wiretaps Silak's phone and intercepts a call to Neely, an inmate he has supplied a testimony to in exchange for information. Leo alerts his old friend Assistant District Attorney Liz Kennedy to the testimony's origins and visits Neely in prison, where he is visiting the bedside of a dying inmate named Carl Becker. Becker had stolen solid gold medallions that were cast by Michelangelo depicting the bronze figures in the ceiling of the Sistine Chapel, which were never found when he was arrested. Leo informs Rollie, who remembers a floppy disk of Chris's video games also had a file named "Becker". Rollie learns that Kim went to work despite the unsafe circumstances. He leaves to find Kim while Leo arranges for Chris to send the file to Velez by modem. At the mall, Chris sends the file and is met by Kim and also the killer, who threatens her. Leo and Velez examine the file and find a name, "Samson", while Rollie arrives at the mall and flees with them to the mall's supermarket, where he incapacitates the killer. Leo takes Velez for a celebratory dinner in Chinatown, but Velez is killed in a drive-by shooting; meanwhile, Neely coerces Becker to give up the location of the medallions. Mike's killer, a hired thug, reveals that Silak has booked a helicopter for the weekend. Leo visits Liz to convince her to help them apprehend Silak, while Rollie surveils Neely and Silak as they retrieve the medallions hidden in a cathedral.

That weekend, Neely and Silak meet at a large waterfront property to rendezvous with appraiser and an associate from the Mafia, who plan to return the medallions to the Vatican after compensating Silak a sum of $10,000,000. The mob does not condone crimes against the church and this is their way of giving back. Meanwhile, Rollie uses his special effect talents to dispatch the guards. Leo and Liz arrive and Leo gives her a gun for her safety. Leo surprises and confronts Silak, Neely, the appraiser and the mob associate inside the house. When he asks Liz to send in the backup she promised, she revealed to be an associate; he attempts to talk her down, but she panics and shoots him, and Neely takes her gun. Suddenly, explosions occur outside that set a guard ablaze. Neely and Silak grab the money and the medallions from the guard and run to the helicopter. Neely tries to double-cross and shoot Silak, but he finds that Liz's gun is loaded with blanks and is shot and killed by Silak. As Rollie prepares to pursue Silak's helicopter in a boat, an unharmed Leo reveals that he had discovered her involvement in the scheme when he saw her cat's name, Samson, and which was confirmed when the backup he told her to call never arrived. As police arrive, Leo and Rollie board the boat and pursue Silak.

In the helicopter, Silak notices the helicopter flying haphazardly and realizes the pilot is Bluey, who leaps from the helicopter carrying the satchel of $10,000,000. Rollie and Leo recover Bluey, the money and Leo explains the Mafia's intentions with the medallions to Rollie. It is revealed that the guard who was set ablaze outside and then broke through the window where the appraiser was sitting switched the real medallions with duplicates, leaving Rollie and Leo now in possession of the real ones. The pair decide to return the medallions themselves to a collection plate in a church in Rome.

== Cast ==
Actor	Character
Bryan Brown	Roland "Rollie" Tyler
Brian Dennehy	Leo McCarthy
Rachel Ticotin	Kim Brandon
Joanna Gleason	Assistant District Attorney Liz Kennedy
Philip Bosco	Lieutenant Ray Silak
Kevin J. O'Connor	Matt Neely
Tom Mason	Mike Brandon
Dominic Zamprogna	Chris Brandon, Mike's son
Josie de Guzman	Marisa Velez
John Walsh (Stunt performer)	Rado
Peter Boretski	Carl Becker
Lisa Fallon-Actress	Kylie
Lee Broker	DeMarco
Philip Akin	Detective McQuay
Tony DeSantis	Detective Santoni
Cynthia Quinn and Karl Baumann Actor	Bluey
James Stacy	The Cyborg

== Production ==
Filming took place in Toronto. Vic Armstrong was called in to direct the last few weeks. He said Franklin "had some kind of personal problems going on, but I think there was a lot of stuff happening behind the scenes that I didn't know about."

== Reception ==
The film debuted at number No. 1 at the box office, but was not as successful as its predecessor. On review aggregator Rotten Tomatoes, the film has a "rotten" score of 38% from 16 reviews.

Kevin Thomas of the Los Angeles Times commented that "'FX2' is more elaborate [than the original], especially in its gadgetry, and at times more improbable than the original, but it’s just as much fun, largely because Brian Dennehy’s veteran Irish cop now gets equal screen time with Brown." Stephen Holden of The New York Times opined that "as long as it is fixated on gadgetry, 'FX2' is reasonably entertaining. But when the movie focuses on plot and character, it turns quite dotty in an amiable way. The story is as far-fetched as it is tortuous and deals with police corruption, the theft of some priceless gold coins, relations between the Mafia and the Vatican, and a boy's computer software. It also involves two double crosses, neither of which comes as much of a surprise. At the end of the movie, loose ends are dangling everywhere."

Paul Willistein of The Morning Call of Allentown, Pennsylvania dismissed the film as "kiddie fare, lacking the intelligence and wit of the original with plot holes so big the real special effect here will be holding the audience's attention span." Roger Ebert gave the film two stars out of four and said, "There should be a special category for movies that are neither good nor bad, but simply excessive. [...] F/X 2 is actually the kind of movie that rewards inattention. Sit quietly in the theater and watch it, and you will be driven to distraction by its inconsistencies and loopholes. But watch it on video, paying it half a mind, and you might actually find it entertaining."
