= Kill Me Three Times =

2014 film

- Theatrical release poster
- Directed by: Kriv Stenders
- Written by: James McFarland
- Produced by: Tania Chambers; Laurence Malkin; Share Stallings
- Starring: Sullivan Stapleton; Alice Braga; Teresa Palmer; Callan Mulvey; Luke Hemsworth; Bryan Brown; Simon Pegg
- Cinematography: Geoffrey Simpson
- Edited by: Jill Bilcock
- Music by: Johnny Klimek
- Production companies: Cargo Entertainment; Feisty Dame Productions; Media House Capital; Parabolic Pictures Inc.; Soundfirm Australia; Stable Way Entertainment
- Distributed by: Entertainment One Films (Australia); Magnet Releasing (US)
- Release dates: 6 September 2014 (TIFF); 28 November 2014 (Australia); 10 April 2015 (United States)
- Running time: 90 minutes
- Countries: Australia; United States
- Language: English
- Box office: $101,807

Kill Me Three Times is a 2014 black comedy thriller film directed by Kriv Stenders, which follows a hit man who falls into schemes of blackmail, murder, and revenge. It was selected to be screened in the Contemporary World Cinema section at the 2014 Toronto International Film Festival. The film was released in the United States on 10 April 2015, by Magnet Releasing.

== Plot ==
In Eagles Nest, Western Australia, a wealthy motel proprietor Jack Taylor believes his wife Alice to be having an affair. After a violent argument, Jack hires Charlie Wolfe, a private investigator and contract killer. When Charlie returns with video proof that Alice is having sex with Dylan Smith, Jack orders Charlie to kill her. Alice makes an appointment with dentist Nathan Webb to work on her tooth, which Jack chipped when he hit her. Jack tells Charlie about Alice's dentist appointment. Before she leaves, Alice sneaks into Jack's office and robs his safe.

Charlie is amused to see Nathan and his receptionist wife Lucy drug Alice, kidnap her, and eventually, after several mishaps, send her over a cliff in a flaming car. Charlie takes incriminating pictures of the acts. Lucy finds Jack's stolen money in Alice's bag and takes it before trying to kill her. Unknown to all involved, Alice wakes up in time to escape the car before it crashes and explodes. Satisfied that Alice is dead, Charlie returns to Jack for payment, not telling him that the hit was carried out by other people. When Jack finds his safe empty, he immediately suspects Alice and Dylan. He reassures Charlie he has more money in the bank, and Charlie says he will return the next day.

Meanwhile, Nathan and Lucy initiate their insurance fraud scheme by exchanging Lucy's dental records with Alice's, hoping to fool people into believing that Lucy died in the fiery car crash. Bruce Jones, a corrupt cop, immediately recognizes the fraud, and while impressed that Nathan is able to murder his own wife, demands half the payout to stay quiet. At the same time, Charlie anonymously blackmails Nathan with pictures of Alice's kidnapping and assumed death. Lucy pushes Nathan to pay the blackmailer and be done with it, and he reluctantly sets up a meeting.

Dylan confronts and kills Jack. Charlie leaves to meet Nathan. Because he is the only one who can collect the insurance money, Nathan believes himself safe from harm. When Nathan is uncooperative, Charlie surprises Nathan by shooting him. As he dies, Nathan reveals the location of the money Alice stole from Jack, which he recovered during Alice's kidnapping. Charlie returns to collect his money from Jack, only to find Jack dead. At the same time, Bruce stumbles upon Charlie at the crime scene. Charlie kills Bruce. Charlie sneaks into Lucy's house, but, instead of killing her, reveals they are working together.

Lucy is upset that Charlie has killed Nathan, as she can no longer collect the insurance money on her own faked death. Charlie says he will not split the remaining money with her and leaves, though he tells her that she will now inherit Jack's hotel business, as he was her brother. When Dylan arrives, both Lucy and Charlie claim the other murdered Alice. Dylan shoots at Charlie, but Charlie deflects his aim so that the bullet strikes and kills Lucy. As Charlie prepares to kill Dylan, Alice sneaks up behind him and knocks him off the deck. Alice and Dylan leave with the money as Charlie weakly answers his phone to assure a client that he will make an appointment, despite being impaled on a metal garden stake.

== Cast ==
- Simon Pegg as Charlie Wolfe
- Alice Braga as Alice Taylor
- Sullivan Stapleton as Nathan Webb, a dental surgeon with a gambling debt
- Teresa Palmer as Lucy Webb, Nathan's wife and receptionist
- Luke Hemsworth as Dylan Smith
- Callan Mulvey as Jack Taylor
- Bryan Brown as Bruce Jones, a corrupt cop
- Steve Le Marquand as Sam

== Production ==
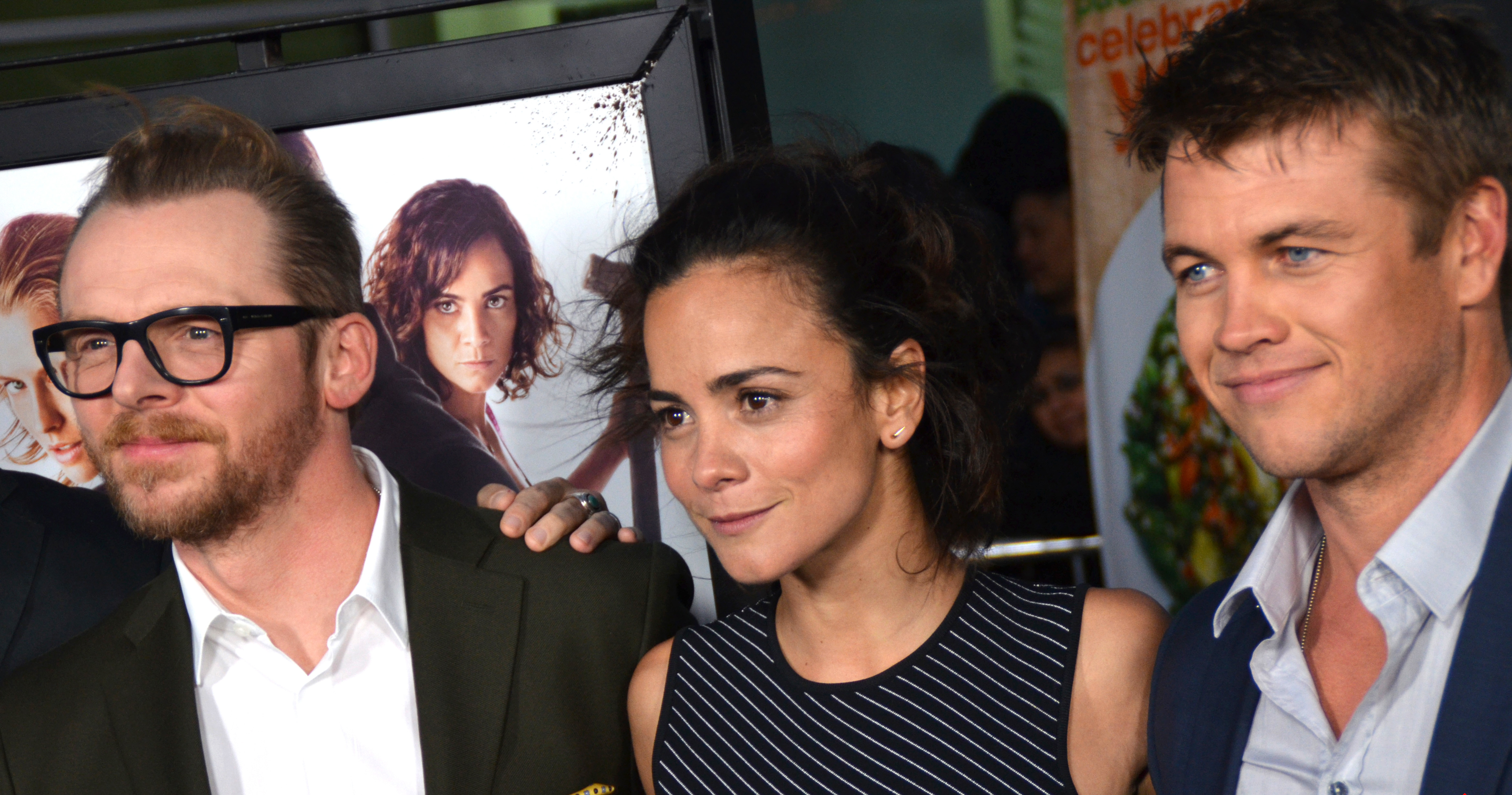
Simon Pegg, Alice Braga and Luke Hemsworth at the Los Angeles premiere of the film in March 2015.

Filming started in September 2013, in Perth. Shooting took place in various locations in Western Australia, including wine-producing area Margaret River. Post-production was done in Victoria.

The screenplay was written by Irish screenwriter James McFarland, his first screenplay. The story is told from three different points of view.

== Release ==
The film was first released at the Toronto International Film Festival in September 2014, then in the UK at the London Film Festival the following month. It was then released in the U.S. for limited audiences in April 2015. In August 2015, the film was screened in Sydney, Melbourne and Perth, before being released on DVD, VOD and iTunes 9 September 2015

== Reception ==
Kill Me Three Times received negative reviews from critics. On Rotten Tomatoes, the film has a rating of 16%, based on 55 reviews, with a rating of 4.07/10. The site's critical consensus reads, "Kill Me Three Times offers Simon Pegg an opportunity to play against type as a villain; unfortunately, its derivative storyline fails to offer much of anything to viewers." On Metacritic, the film has a score of 30 out of 100, based on 20 critics, indicating "generally unfavorable reviews".

Justin Chang of Variety said of Pegg and the film, "Simon Pegg plays a bemused hitman in Kriv Stenders' tiresomely derivative Australian-noir bloodbath." David Rooney of The Hollywood Reporter called it derivative of Quentin Tarantino, Robert Rodriguez, the Coen brothers, and Martin McDonagh's Seven Psychopaths.

=== Accolades ===
Award	Category	Subject	Result
AACTA Award (5th)	Best Original Screenplay	James McFarland	Nominated
Screen Producers Australia Award	Best Feature Film Production	Tania Chambers	Nominated
Screen Producers Australia Award	Best Feature Film Production	Laurence Malkin	Nominated
Screen Producers Australia Award	Best Feature Film Production	Share Stallings	Nominated
