= Starkweather (film) =

- Directed by: Byron Werner
- Written by: Stephen Johnston
- Produced by: Mark Boot; Justin Peyton
- Starring: Brent Taylor; Shannon Lucio
- Cinematography: Byron Werner
- Edited by: Karl T. Hirsch
- Distributed by: THINKFilm
- Release date: 2004
- Running time: 92 minutes
- Country: United States
- Language: English

Starkweather is a 2004 film directed by Byron Werner, written by Working Class Films founder and screenwriter Stephen Johnston (with scripts including In the Light of the Moon and Ted Bundy), and starring Brent Taylor and Shannon Lucio.

The film is based on the life of spree killer Charles Starkweather. It was filmed in September 2003 in Acton, California and Lancaster, California and filmed on 35mm.

== Cast ==
- Brent Taylor as Charles Starkweather
- Shannon Lucio as Caril Ann Fugate
- Jerry Kroll as Sheriff Merle Karnopp
- Lance Henriksen as The Mentor
- Steven K. Grabowsky as The Dark Man
- Rodney Ballard as Young Charles Starkweather
- George Lindsey, Jr. as Guy Starkweather
- Keir O'Donnell as Bob Von Buch
- America Young as Barbara Fugate
- Justin Ipock as Bobby Colvert
- Al Sapienza as Deputy Dale Fahrnbruch
