= Spring Break Shark Attack =

2005 South African-American thriller film

- premiere poster
- Based on: story by J.J. Jamieson
- Written by: James LaRosa
- Directed by: Paul Shapiro
- Starring: Shannon Lucio; Riley Smith; Justin Baldoni; Kathy Baker; Bryan Brown
- Music by: Danny Lux
- Countries of origin: United States; South Africa
- Original language: English

Production
- Producers: Leslie Belzberg; Ted Babcock; J.J. Jamieson; Peter Sadowski
- Cinematography: Michael Brierley
- Editor: Micky Blythe
- Running time: 88 minutes
- Production companies: Von Zerneck Sertner Films; Film Afrika Worldwide

Original release
- Network: CBS
- Release: 20 March 2005

Spring Break Shark Attack is a 2005 joint South African-American made-for-TV thriller film. It was the brainchild of executive producer J.J. Jamieson, who wrote the initial story and sold it to CBS. The teleplay was written by James LaRosa and directed by Paul Shapiro. The film stars Shannon Lucio, Riley Smith, and Justin Baldoni, with Kathy Baker and Bryan Brown. After television release in the United States, the film had a limited non-US theatrical release, before going to DVD.

== Plot ==
During spring break, when a pack of tiger sharks begins a feeding frenzy on partying teen-aged bathers, the only safe place is up on the beach far from the water. Fighting for survival, a group of young people must attempt to outsmart nature's perfect predator.

Danielle (Shannon Lucio) is a teen-aged girl who, against her father's wishes, heads to Florida for spring break. Rather than the truth, she tells her parents that she is going to spend the time working with Habitat For Humanity, but she instead meets up with two girlfriends who have rented a beach house at Seagull Beach, Florida, for a week, fully intent on having a good time. As she explores the beach area, she meets the creepy J.T. (Justin Baldoni), who sees her as only a spring break sexual conquest. She also meets local charter boat owner Shane Jones (Riley Smith), and decides she likes him. J.T. is willing to do anything to achieve his goal of sex with Danielle, and so charters the boat that Shane and his mother (Kathy Baker) have been hiring out to tourists. When everyone is out at sea they learn that the waters are becoming infested with an increasing number of tiger sharks. Danielle's marine biologist brother, Charlie (Wayne Thornley) just happens to also be doing research on an artificial reef in the same location, and must determine how best to save his sister and warn others.

== Cast ==
- Shannon Lucio as Danielle Harrison
- Riley Smith as Shane Jones
- Justin Baldoni as J.T.
- Kathy Baker as Mary Jones
- Bryan Brown as Joel Gately
- Bianca Lishansky as Karen
- Genevieve Howard as Alicia
- Warren McAslan as Max
- Wayne Thornley as Charlie Harrison
- Wayne Harrison as Peter Harrison
- Sindi Harrison as Maggie
- Mehboob Bawa as Professor Wellington
- Brian McIntyre as Handsome Man in beach bar
- Shaun McIntyre as Ginger man at beach bar

== Critical response ==
The Washington Post offered that Spring Break Shark Attack was "a true dream title" for something viewers might expect to watch on late night Cinemax or on USA Network in prime time, or find in a list of direct-to-video losers. They also offered that even with the ridiculous title, the film's "scary parts really are scary, enough so that little kids should be sent to their rooms." Visual effects were approved, in that when a partly chewed victim washes up on the beach, it actually looked like a partially eaten shark victim, rather than something sanitized for television. They felt the film "works on its own frankly silly, fitfully gripping level" if one has "two hours to kill and a harmless lust for artificial blood."

DVD Talk spoke toward the film being a drama about teens who look older than they're supposed to who have "to deal with their relationships and romantic encounters and all the melodrama that accompanies that type of material" and described it as "basically Beverly Hills 90210 with sharks." They felt the film had an issue with the sharks themselves being used at first so infrequently that the final 20 minutes of the film become makes "up for lost time by throwing in sharks by the hundreds." While the anticipated underwater photography is limited, there "are a couple of decent shark/kill scenes and a corpse or two that washes up on the beach, but nothing interesting enough to really stand out or make the film more any more enjoyable." The film's cinematography is decent and the film looks nice, and while no performance is particularly bad, no one stands out either. The film thus becomes the "very embodiment of mediocrity, resulting in boredom – the biggest flaw that can be committed." The film's very few appreciated moments do not act to save the film.

Dread Central found the film to be "two hours of mildly laughable, suspense-free entertainment," where CBS's attempt to create a nature gone amok genre failed in its purpose.

Marissa Piazzola of Huffington Post listed the film among the "Top 8 Teen Movies About Spring Break!"
