= 20,000 Leagues Under the Sea (1997 miniseries) =

1997 two-part television miniseries directed by Rod Hardy

- ABC promotional poster for the 1997 television miniseries 20,000 Leagues Under the Sea
- Genre: Adventure; Romance; Science fiction
- Based on: Twenty Thousand Leagues Under the Seas by Jules Verne
- Screenplay by: Brian Nelson
- Directed by: Rod Hardy
- Starring: Michael Caine; Patrick Dempsey; Mia Sara; Bryan Brown
- Theme music composer: Mark Snow
- Countries of origin: United States; Australia
- Original language: English
- No. of episodes: 2

Production
- Executive producers: Jeffrey M. Hayes; Keith Pierce; Richard Pierce
- Producer: Dean Barnes
- Production locations: Village Roadshow Studios, Oxenford, Queensland, Australia; Point Cook, Victoria, Australia; Movieworld Studios, Australia
- Cinematography: James Bartle; Ron Hagen; Bruce Phillips
- Editor: Drake Silliman
- Running time: 158 minutes
- Production companies: Frederick S. Pierce Company; Village Roadshow Pictures Television

Original release
- Network: ABC
- Release: 11 May – 12 May 1997

20,000 Leagues Under the Sea is a 1997 two-part television miniseries produced by Village Roadshow Pictures Television, based on the 1870 novel Twenty Thousand Leagues Under the Seas by Jules Verne. It was written by Brian Nelson and directed by Rod Hardy. The series aired on ABC from 11 May to 12 May 1997.

== Plot ==
The Nautilus has been sinking and damaging ships and is at first thought to be a giant narwhal. The USS Abraham Lincoln, with marine biologist Pierre Aronnax, harpooner Ned Land and escaped slave Cabe Attucks aboard, is sent to pursue and destroy the threat. After the ship is attacked by the Nautilus, Pierre, Ned and Cabe are knocked overboard and are picked up by the Nautilus crew, led by Captain Nemo.

With the three men presumed dead, the Abraham Lincoln makes it back to port and is repaired. Pierre's widowed father, Thierry Aronnax, joins the naval party. Thierry, also a marine biologist, has always been hateful and bitter toward his son because the boy's mother died while giving birth to him and because the elder Aronnax's mistress had come to prefer Pierre to his father.

Nemo is setting up an underwater domed city under the Atlantic south of West Africa. To avoid earthquake risks to it, he is first setting up a network of underwater explosives to release all Earth's geotectonic tensions at once and thus ensure that no more build up for a long while. During this, a Chinese-looking pearl diving girl accidentally activates one of these devices and the Nautilus rescues her in time.

Nemo's daughter Mara and Pierre become mutually attracted to each other. An accident destroys Pierre's right hand, and Nemo replaces it with a mechanical hand similar to his own.

The US Navy locates Nemo's base by a concentrated area of sightings of the Nautilus. The Abraham Lincoln, with Thierry Aronnax aboard, sails there.

Damage caused by Ned Land (killing him in the process) and torpedoes fired downwards by the Abraham Lincoln, force the Nautilus to surface. The Nautilus's crew come out on deck and are summarily machine-gunned by the Abraham Lincoln's deck-mounted Gatling guns. Mara and some others escape in one of the Nautilus's diving bells, but Mara is picked up and held prisoner aboard the Abraham Lincoln. Thierry Aronnax boards the Nautilus and shoots Nemo on sight. After a final confrontation between Pierre and his father on the deck of the Nautilus, Nemo, before dying, activates a switch in his mechanical hand causing the Nautilus to explode, destroying the Abraham Lincoln as well.

Pierre is rescued by Cabe and the pearl diver, who have escaped in a Nautilus diving bell. Pierre's account of these events finds its way to Jules Verne, who uses it as a basis for his novel Twenty Thousand Leagues Under the Seas.

== Cast ==
- Michael Caine as Captain Nemo
- Patrick Dempsey as Pierre Arronax
- Mia Sara as Mara
- Bryan Brown as Ned Land
- Adewale Akinnuoye-Agbaje as Cabe Attucks
- John Bach as Thierry Arronax
- Nicholas Hammond as Saxon
- Peter McCauley as Admiral McCutcheon
- Kerry Armstrong as Lydia Rawlings
- Cecily Chun as Imei
- Ken Senga as Shimoda
- Damian Monk as Denison
- Steven Grives as Garfield
- Gerry Day as Nitongu
- Boe Kaan as Ivanda

== Differences from the novel ==
The Nautilus gets its power by extracting the Sun's heat from the sea water: this is impossible technology, and the movie wrongly calls it hydroelectricity.

== Reception ==
DVD Verdict wrote the miniseries "comes off as incomplete", but praised Michael Caine's performance as Captain Nemo. David Cornelius of DVD Talk called the adaptation "dreadfully dull", disapproving of director Hardy's and screenwriter Nelson's work.

== See also ==
- List of underwater science fiction works
