= Dress (film) =

2013 short drama film directed by Henry Ian Cusick

- Directed by: Henry Ian Cusick
- Written by: Susan Soon He Stanton; Henry Ian Cusick
- Produced by: Henry Ian Cusick; Annie Cusick Wood; Brent Anbe; Angela LaPrete; Matthew B. Locey
- Starring: Henry Ian Cusick; Asher Abraham; Ho'Ano Au
- Cinematography: Don King
- Edited by: Mitchell Sinoway
- Music by: Michael Giacchino; Grant Lee Phillips
- Production company: HenryJoe Productions
- Release date: 2013
- Running time: 19 minutes
- Country: United States
- Language: English

Dress is a 2013 American short drama film directed by Henry Ian Cusick, who also stars in the lead role. The film was written by Cusick and Susan Soon He Stanton and produced through HenryJoe Productions. Shot in Hawaiʻi, the film explores grief, family, memory, and acceptance following the death of a wife and mother.

The film marked Cusick's directorial debut and premiered at the Hawaiʻi International Film Festival (HIFF) in 2013, where it received the Audience Award for Best Short Film.

== Synopsis ==
After the death of his Hawaiian wife, Maile, widowed father Ben Granger struggles to cope with his grief while caring for his two sons. Finding comfort in wearing one of Maile's dresses, Ben's unusual way of mourning creates confusion and tension within the family, especially with his teenage son Koa.

As father and son confront their pain and misunderstandings, the family learns to accept grief, memory, and the different ways people find healing.

== Cast ==
- Henry Ian Cusick as Ben Granger
- Asher Abraham as Jonas Granger
- Ho'Ano Au as Koa Granger
- Riley Graves-Lock as Lika
- Maile Holck as Margie
- Loretta Ables
- Moana Lum
- Margaret Jones
- Kordell Kekoa
- Celia Kenney
- Hermenigildo "Junior" Tesoro
- Valerie Watanbe

== Production ==
Dress was written and directed by Henry Ian Cusick, who also portrayed Ben Granger.

Susan Soon He Stanton collaborated on the screenplay. The film was produced by HenryJoe Productions, with producers including Cusick, Annie Cusick Wood, Brent Anbe, Angela LaPrete, and Matthew B. Locey.

The film was shot in Hawaiʻi and featured a cast made up of local actors.

== Music and cinematography ==
Don King served as cinematographer.

Mitchell Sinoway edited the film. The music included contributions from Michael Giacchino and Grant Lee Phillips.

== Release ==
Dress premiered at the Hawaiʻi International Film Festival in 2013 as a North American premiere selection.

Following its HIFF premiere, the film screened at additional independent film festivals throughout the United States, including the Fargo Film Festival, Pasadena Film Festival, Sedona International Film Festival, Peace on Earth Film Festival, Durango Film Festival, and USA Film Festival.

== Reception ==
The film received positive attention from independent film reviewers for its emotional storytelling, performances, cinematography, and exploration of family grief.

Chicago Stage Standard reviewed the film during its Peace on Earth Film Festival screening, praising Cusick's direction, the performances, cinematography, musical score, and emotional portrayal of a family coping with loss.

== Awards and festivals ==
Dress received recognition at multiple independent film festivals.

Festival	Location	Year	Recognition
Hawaiʻi International Film Festival (HIFF)	Honolulu, Hawaiʻi	2013	North American Premiere; Audience Award for Best Short Film
Fargo Film Festival	Fargo, North Dakota	2014	Festival Selection
Pasadena Film Festival	Pasadena, California	2014	Festival Selection
Sedona International Film Festival	Sedona, Arizona	2014	Festival Selection
Peace on Earth Film Festival	Chicago, Illinois	2014	Best Short Narrative
Durango Film Festival	Durango, Colorado	2014	Festival Selection
USA Film Festival	Dallas, Texas	2014	Finalist; Festival Award Recognition

At the 2013 Hawaiʻi International Film Festival, audiences selected Dress as the winner of the Audience Award for Best Short Film.

At the Peace on Earth Film Festival, the film received Best Short Narrative recognition.

The film also received recognition at the USA Film Festival.

== Legacy ==
Dress established Henry Ian Cusick as a filmmaker in addition to his acting career. It was his first major directing project and was followed by later directing work, including the short film Salvador.

== Notability ==
Dress has received recognition through independent film festivals, reviews, and filmmaker coverage.

The film is notable for:

- being Henry Ian Cusick's directorial debut;
- receiving the Hawaiʻi International Film Festival Audience Award for Best Short Film;
- receiving Best Short Narrative recognition at the Peace on Earth Film Festival;
- receiving recognition at the USA Film Festival;
- screening at multiple independent film festivals across the United States.
