= Darwin's Darkest Hour =

- Nova episode
- DVD cover
- Episode no.: Season 36; Episode 10
- Directed by: John Bradshaw
- Written by: John Goldsmith
- Original air date: October 6, 2009
- Running time: 114 minutes

Episode chronology
← Previous "Musical Minds"	Next → "Hubble's Amazing Rescue"

"Darwin's Darkest Hour" is a 2009 American drama television episode from Nova produced in collaboration with National Geographic. It details the life of Charles Darwin until the publication of On the Origin of Species, partially through flashbacks. The episode stars Henry Ian Cusick as Charles Darwin and Frances O'Connor as his wife Emma.

== Plot ==
In 1858, Charles Darwin thinks about publicly releasing his ideas despite knowing that he would receive backlash from the Christian community. Another major concern for Darwin is that British naturalist Alfred Russel Wallace had the same theory of evolution existing through natural selection and upon the arrival of Wallace's letter to him in June 1858, Darwin becomes worried that he will not be able to publish his own similar theory. While Darwin ponders if he should publish his theory, he discusses the matter with his wife Emma for two weeks while also telling her about the events that led to his theory of natural selection. During this time, their youngest son catches scarlet fever and dies shortly after. The events that Darwin discusses with his wife include his expedition on HMS Beagle. Interspersed between their discussions are flashbacks of their family life which includes the time they spent with their children, the experiments that Darwin completed teaching his children, and the death of their 10-year-old daughter Anne. Despite Emma coming to terms with how her husband's research could affect her faith and them both knowing of the backlash that would soon happen, Darwin decides to publish his work under the title of On the Origin of Species in 1859.

== Production and release ==
The episode premiered on PBS in the United States on October 6, 2009. NHK acquired distribution rights to release the episode in Japan. It was filmed for the bicentennial anniversary of Darwin's birth and the 150th anniversary of On the Origin of Species being published. The screenwriter was John Goldsmith who has previously written for Victoria & Albert, David Copperfield, and Kidnapped. Henry Ian Cusick plays Charles Darwin and Frances O'Connor plays Emma Darwin. The episode was released on DVD and Blu-ray.

== Reception ==
Janet Browne, writing for the Bulletin of the History of Medicine, stated, "The documentary is a pleasure to watch, the main threads are easy to understand, the historical structure does not stand in the way of our emotional engagement with the characters, and there are some very nice moments that work extremely well indeed". Brian Switek of Wired said, "Darwin's Darkest Hour might not be for you. I will leave that for you to decide. If you do not know very much about Darwin, though, the drama is a quick way to achieve a better understanding of who he was". The Boston Globe writer Mark Feeney stated, "Viewers who tune in late might well think they’re watching an episode of Masterpiece Classic".
