= Chimera Strain =

- Directed by: Maurice Haeems
- Written by: Maurice Haeems
- Starring: Henry Ian Cusick; Kathleen Quinlan; Erika Ervin
- Cinematography: David Kruta
- Edited by: Fritz Feick, Brian Scofield
- Music by: Aled Roberts
- Production company: Praxis Media Ventures
- Distributed by: Vertical Entertainment; Lionsgate
- Release dates: February 24, 2018 (Fantasporto Film Festival); March 15, 2019
- Running time: 80 minutes
- Countries: United States; India
- Language: English

Chimera Strain (initially known as Chimera) is a 2018 science fiction drama/thriller film written and directed by Maurice Haeems, and produced by Jay Sitaram and Maurice Haeems.

== Plot ==
A genius but mentally unbalanced scientist, Quint, attempts to save his terminally ill children, Miles and Flora, by freezing them alive through cryptobiosis. He operates out of a remote, abandoned, and isolated research facility where he clandestinely brings the comatose body of his estranged wife, Jessie, so that he may experiment on her and find a cure for his children. He buries himself in research, and motivated by the fear of loss, he works day and night to find a cure to their deadly genetic disease. He intends to decode the DNA of the Turritopsis jellyfish which are biologically immortal and possess the ability to transdifferentiate. However, Quint faces a number of obstacles, distractions, and antagonists in the form of Jessie’s spirit, his former flame Charlie, and his erstwhile employer Masterson.

== Cast ==
- Henry Ian Cusick as Quint
- Kathleen Quinlan as Masterson
- Erika Ervin as Dita Gruze
- Jenna Harrison as Charlie
- Karishma Ahluwalia as Jessie
- Jennifer Gjulameti as Griffin
- Raviv Haeems as Miles
- Kaavya Jayaram as Flora

== Release ==
The film was released in select theatres and VOD on March 15, 2019 and on DVD on April 16, 2019 by Vertical Entertainment and Lionsgate.

== Accolades ==
Chimera Strain won the following awards:

- Boston International Film Festival 2018 – Best Narrative Feature
- International Horror & Sci-Fi Film Festival 2018 – Best Sci-Fi Feature
- LUSCA Fantastic Film Festival 2018 – Best International Feature Film
- PDXtreme: Portland Underground Film Festival 2019 – Best Feature Film
- Phoenix Film Festival 2018 – Phoenix Film Foundation Best Sci-Fi Feature
- Puerto Rico Horror Film Festival 2018 – Jury Prize Best Feature Film
- Rome International Film Festival 2018 – Best Narrative Feature

The cast and crew of Chimera Strain won the following awards for their work on the film.

- Henry Ian Cusick – Best Actor at PDXtreme: Portland Underground Film Festival 2019
- Kathleen Quinlan – Best Supporting Actress at FilmQuest 2018
- Kathleen Quinlan – Best Supporting Role at NOLA Horror Film Festival 2018
- David Kruta – Best Cinematography at Boston International Film Festival 2018
- Lawrence Sampson – Best Production Design at New York City Independent Film Festival 2018
- Sara Mills-Broffman – Best Costumes at New York City Independent Film Festival 2018
