= Dead in the Water (1991 film) =

1991 American TV movie directed by Bill Condon

- VHS cover
- Genre: Black comedy; Crime comedy
- Based on: Web of Murder by Harry Whittington
- Screenplay by: Eleanor E. Gaver; Robert Seidenberg; Walter Klenhard
- Directed by: Bill Condon
- Starring: Bryan Brown; Teri Hatcher; Anne De Salvo; Seymour Cassel; Pruitt Taylor Vince; Anna Thomson; Ron Karabatsos; Daniel Reichert; Veronica Cartwright
- Music by: Philip Giffin
- Country of origin: United States
- Original language: English

Production
- Executive producer: Dan Wigutow
- Producer: Michael M. Scott
- Cinematography: Paul Murphy
- Editor: Virginia Katz
- Running time: 90 minutes
- Production companies: Kevin Bright Productions; MCA Television Entertainment; Matrix Alliance Inc.

Original release
- Network: USA Network
- Release: December 4, 1991

Dead in the Water is a 1991 American black comedy crime television film directed by Bill Condon. It is based on the 1958 novel Web of Murder by Harry Whittington and stars Bryan Brown and Teri Hatcher. The film premiered on the USA Network on December 4, 1991.

== Plot ==
Charlie Deegan is a lawyer who married into his wife Olivia's wealthy family but has become unhappy in their relationship and has become involved in an affair with his assistant Laura. Charlie wants to divorce Olivia, but their prenuptial agreement would prevent him from getting any money, meaning that he will not be able to transition to his dream job as a judge because it pays less than being a lawyer.

Charlie sleeps with Olivia's friend Victoria to misdirect her from his real affair. He then convinces Olivia to go with him to a cabin to work out their problems, where he drowns her in the nearby lake. Charlie and Laura place Olivia's body and various red herring clues in a car that they dump in the water. Several days later Laura's body is found and Charlie is a suspect. Victoria tells Charlie that she had him followed and knew about his affair with Laura, which angered her. She agrees to keep quiet if he agrees to marry her once Olivia is declared dead. Charlie is once again stuck in an unhappy relationship and is then visited by Lou, Laura's secret husband.

== Cast ==
- Bryan Brown as Charlie Deegan
- Teri Hatcher as Laura Stewart
- Anne De Salvo as Olivia Deegan
- Veronica Cartwright as Victoria Haines
- Seymour Cassel as Lieutenant Frank Vaness
- Pruitt Taylor Vince as Lou Rescetti
- Anna Thomson as Edie Meyers
- Ron Karabatsos as Mike Welch
- Daniel Reichert as Jack Homelin
- Tim Haldeman as Prosecutor
- Tom Wright as Hotel Clerk
- Ralph Oliver as Trial Judge
- Eric Christmas as Judge Griffin
- Michael Kaufman as Neurosurgeon
- C. H. Evans as Lodge Manager
- Jo Farkas as Manager's Wife
- Jack Orend as Coroner
- Ernie Lively as Dignitary
- Brent Hinkley as Lake Guard
- Wolf Wirth as Waiter

== Reception ==
Reviewer Peter Sobczynski of rogerebert.com called the film a "low-budget [...] potboiler".

== Home media ==
Dead in the Water was released in Australia as a DVD (4:3 format, region-free) by Flashback Entertainment by arrangement with Umbrella Entertainment.
