= Mike Mayer =

American screenwriter

Mike Mayer is an American writer, director and producer of feature and short films. He was born in Los Angeles, California, where he lives with his wife, Sasha.

Mayer is sometimes credited as Michael Mayer, as in the case of his work with Mediocre Films.

== Early life ==
In college, Mayer was a first team All-American fencer in Sabre.

== Films ==
Mayer wrote, directed and produced the award-winning short film, The Robber, which became one of the first featured shorts ever to air on HBO and Cinemax. Mayer co-wrote and directed the feature film Graduation starring Chris Lowell, Shannon Lucio, Chris Marquette, Riley Smith, Aimee Garcia, Adam Arkin, and Huey Lewis.
