= Just Let Go (film) =

- Directed by: Christopher S. Clark; Patrick Henry Parker
- Written by: Patrick Henry Parker
- Screenplay by: Christopher S. Clark; Vance Mellen
- Based on: Let It Go: A True Story of Tragedy and Forgiveness by Chris Williams
- Starring: Henry Ian Cusick
- Release date: October 9, 2015
- Running time: 106 minutes
- Country: United States

Just Let Go is a 2015 American film about a man dealing with the loss of his wife and two children in a traffic crash.
