= Bob Degus =

American film director

Bob Degus is an American film director and producer, best known for producing films such as Pleasantville and A Man Apart. He made his directorial debut with the film 9/Tenths in 2006.

== Early life ==
Bob Degus grew up in Rochester, New York. His family has worked for Eastman Kodak.

== Career ==
Degus has worked as a writer, director, cinematographer, editor, post-production supervisor, and Oxberry-animation cameraman.

He was the production executive on F. Gary Gray's feature-directorial debut film, Friday, and worked with Gray again on Set It Off and A Man Apart. Degus produced Gary Ross's feature debut film Pleasantville, alongside Steven Soderbergh and John Kilik. This film was nominated for three Academy Awards. In the summer of 2005, Degus produced the independent feature Graduation alongside Jane Sindell, Jason Blum, Robin Bradford, and Scott Hansen.

At New Line Cinema, Degus worked as a production executive. He oversaw the production of Austin Powers: International Man of Mystery, Trial and Error, and B*A*P*S. Degus served as head of production at Chanticleer Films.

Degus directed the 2006 independent feature, 9/Tenths, starring Gabrielle Anwar and Henry Ian Cusick. He also directed and edited a 35 mm short film, Another Round, that was invited to screen at the Los Angeles International Film Festival and was subsequently purchased by Showtime. He produced and conceptualized Funk Blast, an attraction at Paul Allen's Experience Music Project Museum in Seattle. Degus collaborated with James Brown, Maceo Parker, Bootsy Collins, George Clinton, Chaka Khan, and Herbie Hancock, producing a 70 mm film for the attraction.

Degus is an active, voting member of the Academy of Motion Picture Arts and Sciences. He serves on the Foreign Language Film Award Nominating Committee and is a member of the executive board for his branch.

== Filmography ==
He was a producer on all films unless otherwise noted.

=== Film ===
Year	Film	Credit
1995	Pie in the Sky	Associate producer
1996	Set It Off	Associate producer
1998	Pleasantville	Writer, Co-producer & Director
2003	A Man Apart	Producer
2006	9/Tenths	
2007	Graduation	

Miscellaneous crew

Year	Film	Role	Notes
1992	Original Intent	Production coordinator	Direct-to-video
1997	Love! Valour! Compassion!	Production executive	
1997	B.A.P.S.	Production executive	
1997	Austin Powers: International Man of Mystery	Production executive	
1997	Trial and Error	Production executive	
1997	Julian Po	Production executive	

As director

Year	Film
2006	9/Tenths

Sound department

Year	Film	Role
1987	Street Trash	Assistant sound editor

Thanks

Year	Film	Role	Notes
1995	Excessive Force II: Force on Force	Special thanks	Direct-to-video
2015	The Vixens	Special thanks	

=== Television ===
Year	Title	Credit	Notes
1991	Without a Pass	Co-producer	Television film
1992	The Washing Machine Man		Television film
1992	The Witness		Television short
1993	12:01		Television film
1993	Love Matters		Television film
1993	Partners		Television pilot

Miscellaneous crew

Year	Title	Role	Notes
1991	The Letters from Moab	Production coordinator	Television pilot
1992	Fifteenth Phase of the Moon	Production coordinator	Television short

Production manager

Year	Title	Role	Notes
1993	The Last Shot	Executive in charge of production	Television short
1994	Night Driving	Executive in charge of production	Television short

As director

Year	Title	Notes
1993	Another Round	Television short
