= Graduation (2007 film) =

- Promotional poster
- Directed by: Michael Mayer
- Written by: Michael Mayer; D. Cory Turner
- Produced by: Jane Sindell; Bob Degus; Scott Hanson; Robin Bradford
- Starring: Chris Lowell; Shannon Lucio; Riley Smith
- Cinematography: Matthew Uhry
- Edited by: Jane Kurson
- Music by: Brian Ralston
- Production companies: Blumhouse Productions; Blueline Films; Hanson Film Group; Tavistock Pictures
- Distributed by: Redwood Palms Pictures; Truly Indie; Robin Bradford Films
- Release dates: April 24, 2007 (WorldFest Houston); May 2, 2008 (United States)
- Running time: 89 minutes
- Country: United States
- Languages: English; Spanish

Graduation is a 2007 American coming-of-age drama film starring Chris Lowell, Chris Marquette and Riley Smith released theatrically in May 2008. It was made in collaboration with the producers of The Virgin Suicides and Seabiscuit. The film was shot in Beaver Falls, Pennsylvania in 2005. Additional scenes were shot in and outside of North Hills Senior High School.

== Plot ==
A group of high school friends from suburban Pittsburgh—Carl (Chris Marquette), Polly (Shannon Lucio), Chauncey (Riley Smith) and Jackson (Chris Lowell)—are about to graduate. Polly and Chauncey are dating, Carl needs a date to prom and Jackson doesn't seem to know what to do with his life. When Carl's mom becomes ill and needs $100,000 for surgery, Polly comes up with a plan: rob her dad's bank. The plan seems foolproof, and graduation is the perfect alibi; all the kids need to do is steal the keys to the bank's vault. However, things get complicated when Carl falls in love with a bank teller named Suzi and Polly falls in love with Jackson. Through it all—including an unforeseen hostage crisis—the friends learn a lot about themselves.

== Release ==
The movie was released theatrically on May 2, 2008 (limited release). It came out on DVD on May 13, 2008.

== Reception ==
As of June 2020, Graduation holds a 0% approval rating on Rotten Tomatoes, based on six reviews with an average rating of 3.08/10.
