= Shannon Lucio =

American actress

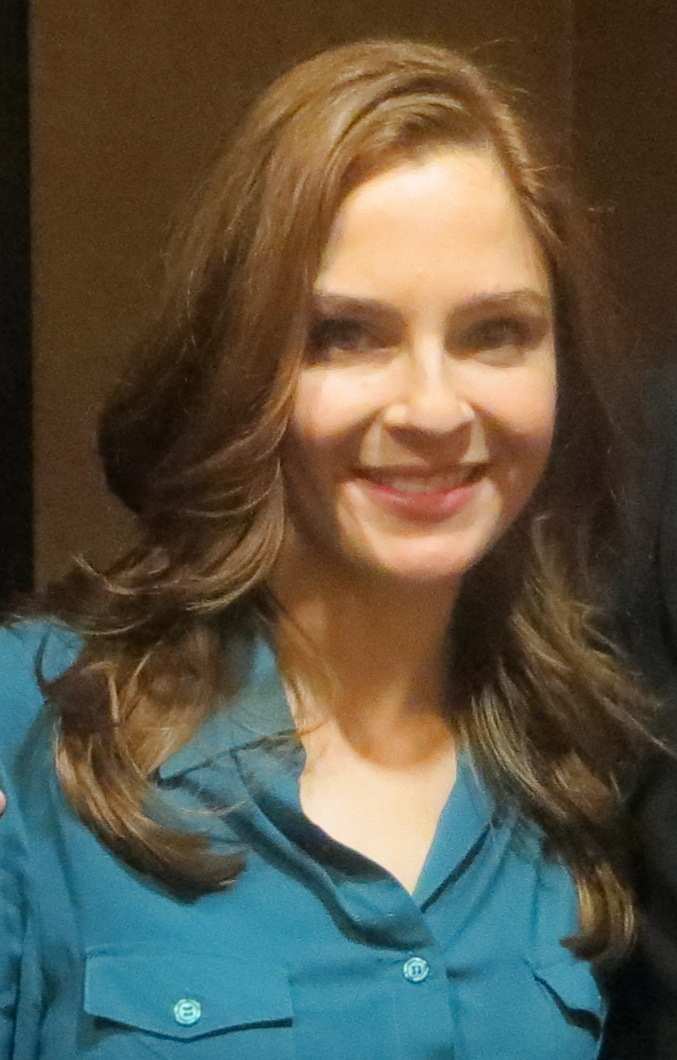
- Shannon at the 2013 Burbank Supernatural convention
- Born: June 25, 1980 (age 46); Denver, Colorado, U.S.
- Occupation: Actress
- Years active: 2003–present
- Children: 1

Shannon Lucio (born June 25, 1980) is an American actress.

== Biography ==
Born in Denver, Colorado, Lucio grew up in San Antonio, Texas, and graduated from John Marshall High School. Her family is of Italian descent. She is a graduate of the University of Southern California with a degree in theatre. She is well known for the acting role of Lindsay Gardner on The O.C.. Lucio was later cast in the lead female role of the CBS television drama Moonlight (2007), but was replaced by Sophia Myles in April 2007. Lucio also played Miriam Hultz/Trishanne in the series Prison Break.

== Filmography ==
=== Film ===
Year	Title	Role	Notes
2004	Starkweather	Caril Ann Fugate	
2005	Youthanasia	Michelle	
2007	Graduation	Polly Deely	
2007	Feast of Love	Janey	
2008	Fireflies in the Garden	Ryne Taylor	
2008	Say Goodnight	Lily	
2008	Baggage	Gwendolyn	Video short
2010	Numb	Maggie	Short film
2010	Swerve	Betty	Short film
2010	Autopilot	Sara Beatly	
2012	Satellite of Love	Catherine	
2012	El cocodrilo	Justene	Short film
2012	Bad Wolf	Granny	Short film
2012	Amen	Spirit	Short film
2013	This Thing with Sarah	Becca	
2013	A Day in the Country	MLE	Short film
2013	Lana	Lana	Short film
2015	The Perfect Guy	Cindy	
2015	Consuming Beauty	Elodine	Short film
2016	Dependent's Day	Kaylee	
2018	Segfault	Blair	
2020	Adam	Christine	AKA Quad
TBA	Gettysburg 1863	Rebecca	Filming

=== Television ===
Year	Title	Role	Notes
2003	ER	Johanna Lambright	Episode: "Missing"
2004	NYPD Blue	Courtney Bates	Episode: "Chatty Chatty Bang Bang"
2004	The Division	Morgan Hillford	Episode: "The Fall of the House of Hayes"
2004	CSI: Miami	Gina Lamar	Episode: "Innocent"
2004–05	The O.C.	Lindsay Gardner	12 episodes
2005	Spring Break Shark Attack	Danielle Harrison	Television movie
2006	A House Divided	Pam Jenks	Television movie
2007	Moonlight	Beth Turner	Unsold TV pilot
2008	The Oaks	Sarah	Episode: "Pilot"
2008–09	Prison Break	Miriam "Trishanne" Holtz	11 episodes
2009	Criminal Minds	Tina Wheeler	Episode: "House on Fire"
2009	Grey's Anatomy	Amanda	3 episodes
2010	The Gates	Teresa	5 episodes
2010	Law & Order: LA	Kim Miller	Episode: "Sylmar"
2010–14	True Blood	Caroline Compton	5 episodes
2011	The Chicago Code	Beth Killian	3 episodes
2012	The Tin Star	Sally Flynn	Television movie
2012	Daybreak	Katherine	3 episodes
2012	Castle	Rebecca Fog	Episode: "Cloudy with a Chance of Murder"
2013	Shadow on the Mesa	Rosalie Eastman	Television movie
2013	Once Upon a Time	Seer	Episode: "Manhattan"
2013	Supernatural	April Kelly	Episode: "I'm No Angel"
2013	Agents of S.H.I.E.L.D.	Debbie	Episode: "Pilot", "Girl in the Flower Dress"
2013	CSI: Crime Scene Investigation	Kristi Holt	Episode: "Passed Pawns"
2015	Bosch	Heather Lyndon	Episode: "The Magic Castle"
2015	The Night Shift	Kim	Episode: "Shock to the Heart"
2016	NCIS	Amy Harrison	Episode: "After Hours"
2016	Rosewood	Casey Reed	Episode: "Atherosclerosis and the Alabama Flim-Flam"
2016	Roots	Patricia Lea	2 episodes
2016	Longmire	Cara Fillmore	Episode: "The Judas Wolf"
2016	American Horror Story: Roanoke	Diana Cross	2 episodes
2018	Dynasty	Mora Van Kirk	1 episode
2020	The Right Stuff	Louise Shepard	4 episodes
2023–present	For All Mankind	Amanda Dale	11 episodes
