= Henry Ian Cusick =

Scottish actor (born 1967)

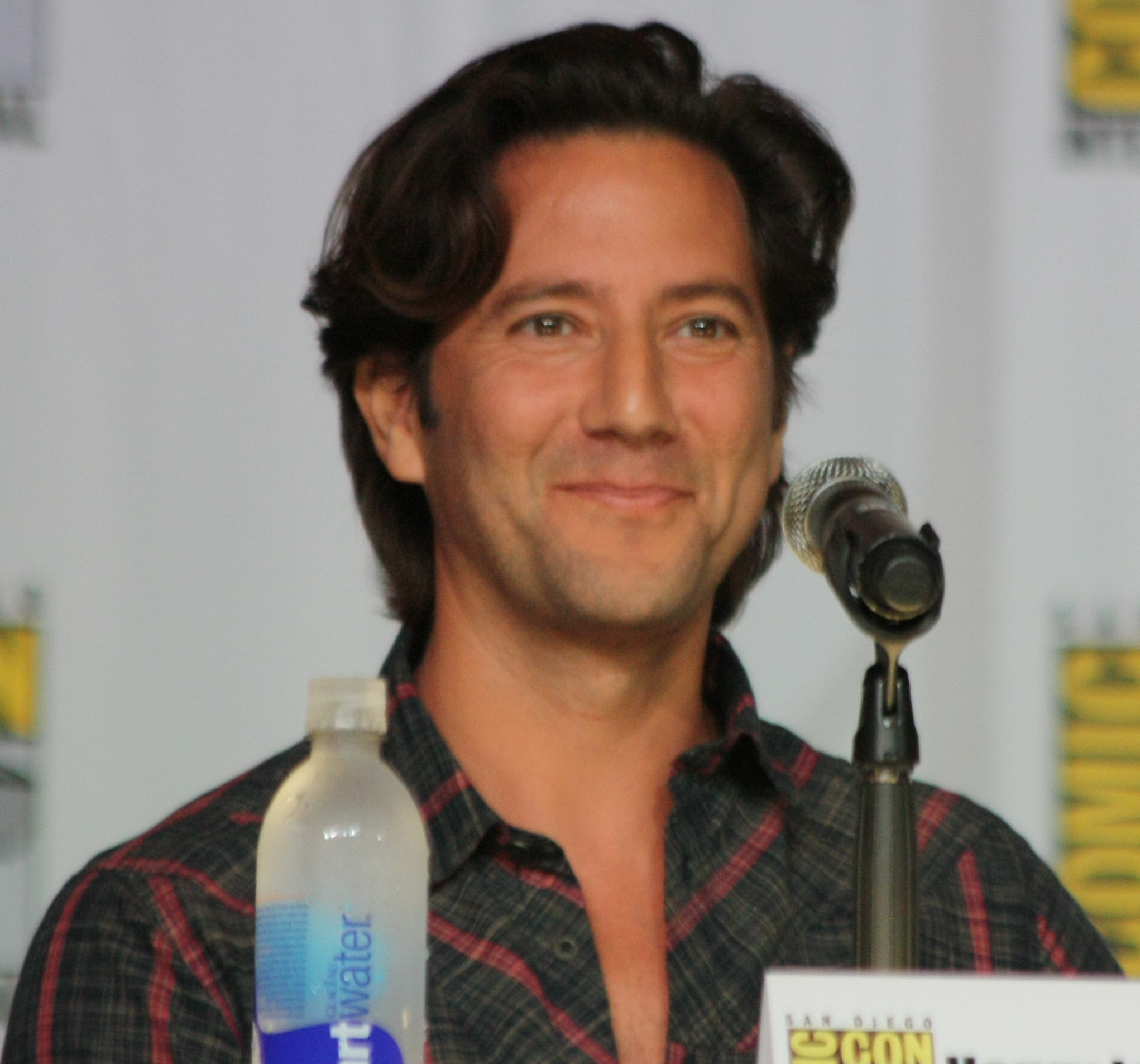
- Cusick in 2007
- Born: 17 April 1967 (age 59); Trujillo, La Libertad, Peru
- Education: Royal Conservatoire of Scotland
- Occupation: Actor
- Years active: 1993–present
- Spouse: Annie Cusick Wood (m. 2006)
- Children: 3
- Website: henryiancusick.com

Henry Ian Cusick (born 17 April 1967) is a Peruvian-Scottish actor and director best known as Desmond Hume in Lost, for which he received a Primetime Emmy Award nomination. He also starred as Jesus in The Gospel of John, Stephen Finch in Scandal, Marcus Kane in The 100, Dr. Jonas Lear in The Passage, and Russell "Russ" Taylor in MacGyver.

== Early life ==
Cusick was born in Trujillo, Peru, to a Peruvian mother, Esperanza Chávez, and a Scottish father, Henry Joseph Cusick. At the age of two, he moved with his family to Madrid, Spain, before they later relocated to Trinidad and Tobago, where they lived for ten years. During this time, Cusick attended Presentation College, San Fernando. He moved to Scotland with his family at the age of fourteen.

Cusick studied at the Royal Scottish Academy of Music and Drama in Glasgow. Following his studies, he became involved with the Strathclyde Theatre Group, an amateur theatre company, where he appeared in a number of productions. He went on to begin his professional acting career at the Citizens' Theatre in Glasgow, where his first role was as an understudy in the Christmas pantomime, portraying a polar bear. Cusick is fluent in English and Spanish.

== Career ==
Cusick began his career as a classical theatre actor, establishing himself through performances in a wide range of stage productions. His early leading roles included Dorian Gray in The Picture of Dorian Gray alongside Rupert Everett, Hamlet in The Marovitz Hamlet, and Horner in The Country Wife.

His performances as Torquato Tasso in the 1994 Edinburgh International Festival production of Torquato Tasso, and as Creon in the Citizens' Theatre production of Oedipus, earned him a commendation at the 1995 Ian Charleson Awards for outstanding performance by a young actor in a classical theatre role.

Cusick transitioned to screen acting with recurring roles in television series including Casualty and The Book Group. In 2003, he portrayed Jesus Christ in the film The Visual Bible: The Gospel of John.

In 2005, Cusick was cast as Desmond Hume in the ABC series Lost. Before joining the series, he appeared as Theo Stoller in the fifth season of 24. Initially introduced as a recurring guest star during the second season, Cusick became a member of the main cast from seasons three through six. His performance earned him a nomination for the Primetime Emmy Award for Outstanding Guest Actor in a Drama Series.

Cusick has credited his casting in Lost to a meeting with executive producer Carlton Cuse, whom he met while staying with his friend, actor Brian Cox. Cuse had been looking for either a Scottish or Irish character, which contributed to Cusick being considered for the role.

Following Lost, Cusick appeared in the 2007 film Hitman and starred in Dead Like Me: Life After Death, a continuation of the television series Dead Like Me. He later appeared as Erik Weber in Law & Order: Special Victims Unit, portrayed Stephen Finch in the ABC drama series Scandal, and played Trent Marsh in Body of Proof.

From 2014 to 2020, Cusick portrayed Marcus Kane in the science fiction drama series The 100.

Alongside his acting career, Cusick has worked as a director. His short film dress, filmed in Kailua, Hawaii, received awards at the Hawaii International Film Festival and the Peace on Earth Film Festival. He later directed the short film Salvador.

In 2017, Cusick partnered with technology start-up JamBios to promote its memory-sharing platform. He provided the voice of Monty, a digital biographer, and recorded more than 200 questions designed to encourage users to record and preserve personal memories.

== Personal life ==
Cusick is married to Annie Cusick Wood. The couple have three sons and reside in Hawaii.

== Filmography ==
=== Films ===
| Year | Title | Role | Notes |
|---|---|---|---|
| 1995 | The Contract | | Short film |
| 2002 | Possession | Toby Byng | Uncredited |
| 2003 | The Gospel of John | Jesus Christ | |
| 2006 | Half Light | Brian | |
| 2006 | 9/Tenths | William | |
| 2006 | After the Rain | Adrian | Short film |
| 2007 | Hitman | Udre Belicoff | |
| 2009 | Dead like Me: Life After Death | Cameron Kane | Direct-to-video release |
| 2013 | Not Another Happy Ending | Willie Scott | |
| 2014 | The Girl On The Train | Danny Hart | |
| 2014 | Frank vs. God | David Frank | |
| 2014 | Dress | Ben Granger | |
| 2014 | 10.0 Earthquake | Jack | |
| 2015 | Pali Road | Tim Young | |
| 2015 | Just Let Go | Christopher "Chris" Williams | |
| 2016 | Visible | Guy | Short film |
| 2016 | Everglades | Scott | |
| 2017 | Rememory | Lawton | |
| 2018 | Chimera Strain | Quint | |
| 2018 | Hae Hawai'i | | Short film |
| 2022 | The Wind & the Reckoning | McCabe | |
| 2023 | Jamojaya | Michael | |
| 2024 | Getting Lost | Himself | |
| 2025 | Fugitive from Asteron | Feran | |
| 2025 | Salvador | Salvador | Short film |
| 2026 | Los Vampires | Luis de Ossorio | |

=== Television ===
| Year | Title | Role | Notes |
|---|---|---|---|
| 1993 | Taggart | Ian Gowrie | Episode "Fatal Inheritance" |
| 1997 | Richard II | Henry Green | TV adaptation of William Shakespeare's play |
| 2001 | Murder Rooms: The White Knight Stratagem | Sgt. Michael Clark | |
| 2001–02 | Casualty | Jason | Recurring role; 9 episodes |
| 2002 | The Dinosaur Hunters | Gideon Mantell | |
| 2002–03 | Two Thousand Acres of Sky | Dr. Ewan Talbot | Recurring role; 9 episodes |
| 2003 | Happiness | Phillip | Episode "A Nice Person" |
| 2003 | Adventure Inc. | Gavin Merrill | Episode "Echoes of the Past" |
| 2003 | The Book Group | Miles Longmuir | Recurring role; 6 episodes |
| 2003 | Carla | Matt | Television film |
| 2004 | Perfect Romance | Peter Campbell | Television film |
| 2004 | Midsomer Murders | Gareth Heldman | Episode "The Fisher King" |
| 2005 | Waking the Dead | Jeremy Allen | Episode "Towers of Silence: Part 2" |
| 2005–10 | Lost | Desmond Hume | Guest (Season 2); Main cast (Seasons 3–6): 77 episodes Nominated – Primetime Emmy Award for Outstanding Guest Actor in a Drama Series; Nominated – Saturn Award for Best Supporting Actor on Television |
| 2006 | 24 | Theo Stoller | Episodes "Day 5: 7:00 p.m.-8:00 p.m." and "Day 5: 8:00 p.m.-9:00 p.m." |
| 2009 | Nova | Charles Darwin | Episode: "Darwin's Darkest Hour" |
| 2010 | Law & Order: Special Victims Unit | Erik Weber | Episodes: "Locum" and "Bullseye" |
| 2012, 2015 | Scandal | Stephen Finch | Main role (season 1); 6 episodes Guest role (season 4), Episode: "No More Blood" |
| 2012 | Fringe | Agent Simon Foster | Episode: Season 4, Episode 19 "Letters of Transit" |
| 2012 | The Mentalist | Tommy Volker | Episodes: "If It Bleeds, It Leads", "Days of Wine and Roses", "Little Red Corvette" |
| 2013 | Hawaii Five-0 | Ernesto, terrorist group leader | Episode: "We Need Each Another" |
| 2013 | CSI: Crime Scene Investigation | Dr. Jimmy | Episode: "Last Woman Standing" |
| 2013 | Body of Proof | Dr. Trent Marsh | Episodes: "Eye for an Eye", "Daddy Issues" |
| 2014–19 | The 100 | Marcus Kane | Main role (Seasons 1-6): 80 episodes Also directed two episodes |
| 2016 | Rush Hour | Thomas | Episode: "Pilot" |
| 2017 | Inhumans | Dr. Evan Declan | Recurring role; 6 episodes |
| 2019 | The Passage | Dr. Jonas Lear | Main role |
| 2020–21 | MacGyver | Russell "Russ" Taylor | Main role |
| 2022–23 | Big Sky | Avery McCallister | Recurring role; 13 episodes |
| 2022–present | The Wingfeather Saga | Artham Wingfeather/ Peet the Sockman (voice) | Recurring role; 9 episodes |
| 2023–24 | NCIS: Hawaiʻi | OSP Supervisory Special Agent John Swift | Recurring role; 5 episodes |
| 2024 | 9-1-1: Lone Star | Enzo De La Costa | 2 episodes |
| 2025 | Butterfly | Nick Barnes | Episode: "Seoul" |
| 2026 | Twenty Twenty Six | Vincente Guajardo | |

=== Video games ===
| Year | Title | Role | Notes |
|---|---|---|---|
| 2008 | Lost: Via Domus | Desmond Hume (voice) | |

== Theatre ==
| Title | Role | Venue | Notes | Ref. |
|---|---|---|---|---|
| The Soldiers | Stolzius | Royal Lyceum Theatre, Edinburgh | Edinburgh International Festival (preview) | |
| Torquato Tasso | Torquato Tasso | Royal Lyceum Theatre, Edinburgh | Commendation, Ian Charleson Awards | |
| Oedipus Rex | Creon / Messenger | Glasgow Citizens Theatre | Commendation, Ian Charleson Awards | |
| The Picture of Dorian Gray | Dorian Gray | Glasgow Citizens Theatre | | |
| The Country Wife | Horner | Glasgow Citizens Theatre | | |
| The Marowitz Hamlet | Hamlet | Glasgow Citizens Theatre | | |
| The Birthday Party | McCann | Glasgow Citizens Theatre | | |
| The Dying Gaul | Jeffrey | Glasgow Citizens Theatre | | |
| The LA Plays | Nick | Almeida Theatre, London | | |
| The Home Show Pieces | | Glasgow Citizens Theatre | | |
| Othello | Cassio | Royal Shakespeare Company | | |
| A Midsummer Night's Dream | Demetrius | Royal Shakespeare Company | | |
| Antony and Cleopatra | Pompey | Royal Shakespeare Company | | |
| Richard II | Henry Green | Royal National Theatre | | |
| The Machine Wreckers | Arthur | Royal National Theatre | | |
| Antony and Cleopatra | Dolabella | Royal National Theatre | | |
| Les Liaisons dangereuses | Le Vicomte de Valmont | Liverpool Playhouse | | |
| Angels in America | Louis Ironson | 7:84 Theatre Company | | |
| Don Juan | Don Juan | Theatre Babel | By Molière | |
| Macbeth | Ross / Witch | Glasgow Citizens Theatre | | |
